= County of East Frisia =

Territory in the Holy Roman Empire

County of East Frisia Grafschaft Ostfriesland (German) Graafschap Oost-Friesland (Dutch) Gróófskup Oostfräisland (East Frisian Low Saxon) Groafskup Aastfräislound (Saterland Frisian)
- 1464–1807
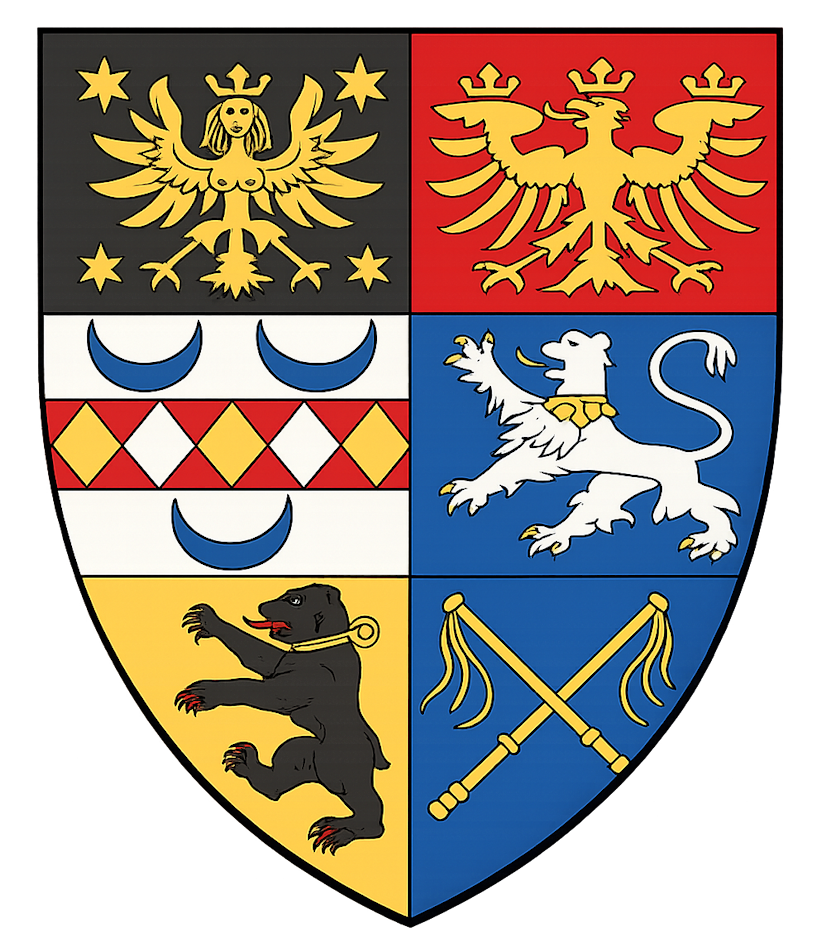
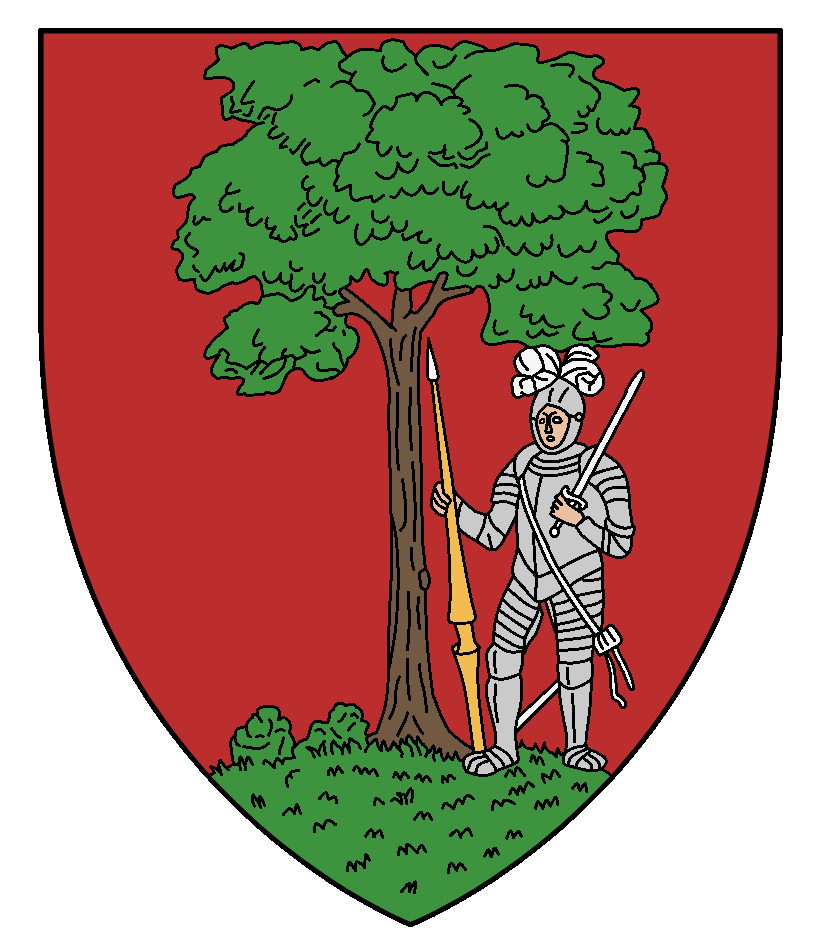
- Royal Coat of Arms (1625–1807) Estatist Coat of Arms (1678-1807)
- Motto: Eala Frya Fresena
- Map of the County of East Frisia in the Lower Rhenish–Westphalian Circle around 1560

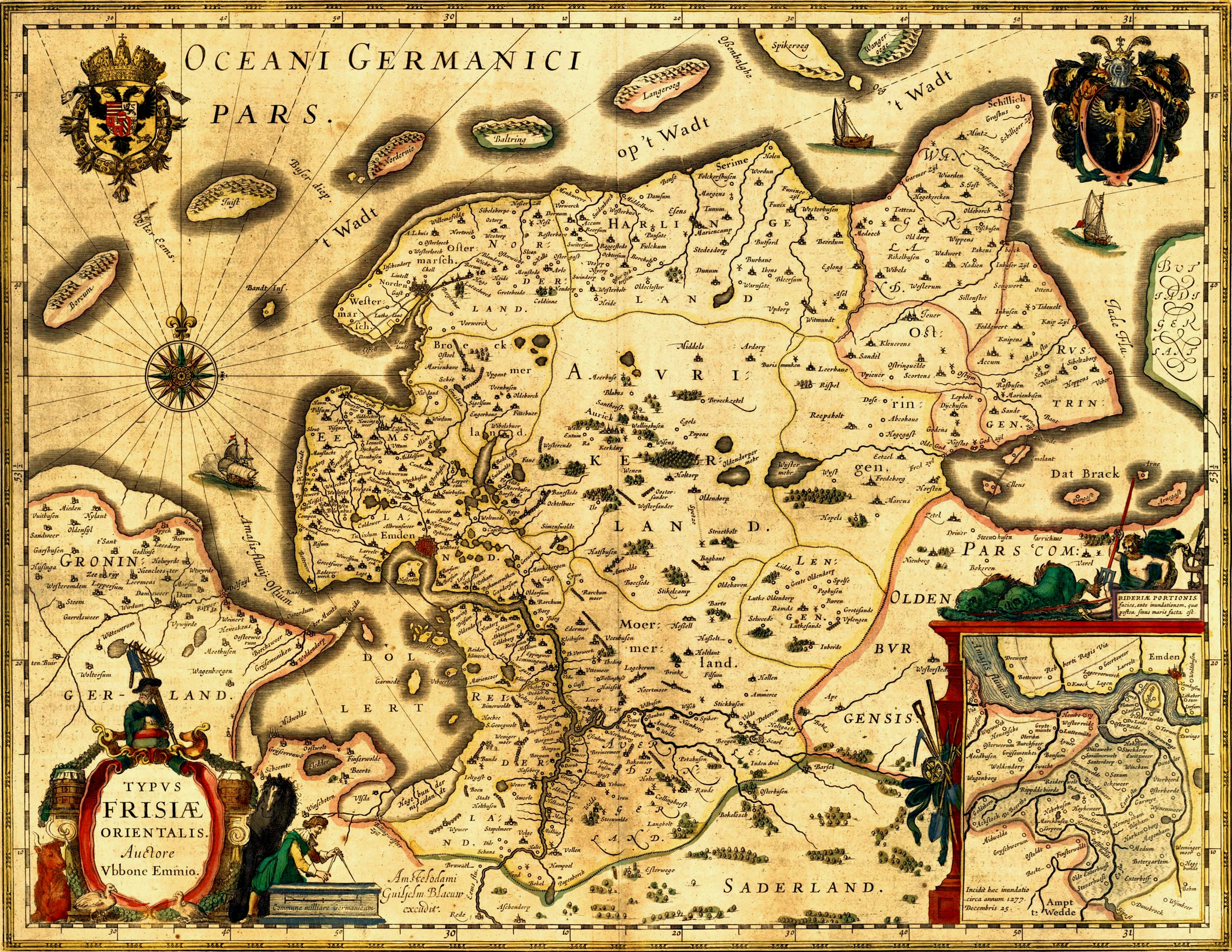
- East Frisia around 1600, by Ubbo Emmius
- Status: Imperial county of the Holy Roman Empire (1464–1806); Personal union with Prussia (1744–1807)
- Capital: Seat of government Emden (1464–1539): Aurich (1539–1807); Royal residence; Emden (1464–1561): Aurich (1561–1807)
- Largest city: Emden
- Common languages: East Frisian (until the 17th century); East Frisian Low Saxon (from the 16th century); Dutch; German
- Religion: Major: Catholicism (until 1528), Lutheranism (in the east), Calvinism (in the west); Minor: Catholicism (from 1528), Zwinglianism, Anabaptism, Judaism
- Demonym: East Frisians
- Government: Feudal semi-constitutional monarchy (1464-1611); Feudal constitutional monarchy (1611-1807)
- Counts and Princes
  - 1464–1466: Ulrich I (first count)
  - 1480-1491: Enno I
  - 1491-1528: Edzard I
  - 1528-1540: Enno II
  - 1561-1599: Edzard II
  - 1599-1625: Enno III
  - 1625-1628: Rudolf Christian
  - 1628-1648: Ulrich II
  - 1651-1660: Enno Louis
  - 1660-1665: George Christian
  - 1690-1708: Christian Everhard
  - 1708-1734: George Albert
  - 1734–1744: Charles Edzard
  - 1744–1786: Frederick II
  - 1797-1807: Frederick William III (last prince)
- Chairman of the East Frisian estates
  - 1717-1744: Heinrich Bernhard von Appelle
  - 1777-1790: Edzard Moritz zu Innhausen und Knyphausen
  - 1790-1806: Carl Gustav zu Innhausen und Knyphausen
- Chancellor
  - 1503-1530: Wilhelm Ubben
  - 1534-1538: Wilhelm Ubben
  - 1539-1541: Henricus Ubbius
  - 1541-1552: Hermann Lenth
  - 1552-1571: Friedrich ter Westen
  - 1599-1611: Thomas Franzius
  - 1611–1637: Dothias Wiarda
  - 1637-1653: Arnold von Bobart
  - 1659-1664: Hermann Höpfner
  - 1686-1692: Johann Heinrich Stamler
  - 1720–1734: Enno Rudolph Brenneysen
  - 1744–1759: Sebastian Anton Homfeld
- Legislature: East Frisian estates
- Historical era: Middle Ages; Early modern era
  - Elevation of Ulrich I to Imperial Count: 1 October 1464
  - Appointment of Albert III as hereditary governor of East Frisia by Maximilian: 27 March 1499
  - Saxon feud: 1514-1517
  - Drafting of the East Frisian Landrecht: 1518
  - Partition of East Frisia between Edzard II and Johann II: 1578-1591
  - Emden Revolution: 1595-1603
  - Treaty of Berum: 28 January 1600
  - Accord of Osterhusen: 21 May 1611
  - Appeal War: 1726-1727
  - Emden Convention: 14 March 1744
  - Death of Charles Edzard, Personal union with Prussia: 25 May 1744
  - Incorporation into the Kingdom of Holland: 9 July 1807

Area
- 1800: 1,800 km^{2} (690 sq mi)

Population
  - 1744: 85,000
  - 1765: 94,000
  - 1786: 103,000
  - 1804: 120,000
- Currency: Guilder, Thaler, Groschen, Krumstert, Stuiver, Flinder, Shilling, Albus
Preceded by
Rheiderland
Overledingerland
Moormerland
Lengenerland
Emsigerland
Federgo
Brokmerland
Auricherland
County of Norden
Lordships of Esens, Stedesdorf and Wittmund
Lordship of Friedeburg
Succeeded by
Kingdom of Holland
- Today part of: Germany; Netherlands

The County of East Frisia (German: Grafschaft Ostfriesland; Dutch: Graafschap Oost-Friesland; East Frisian Low Saxon: Gróófskup Oostfräisland; Saterland Frisian: Groafskup Aastfräislound), also known as the County of Emden or the County of Norden, Emden and Emisgonien in East Frisia, was an imperial county of the Holy Roman Empire in the region of East Frisia in the northwest of the present-day state of Lower Saxony in Germany.

At the beginning of the fifteenth century the chieftain families tom Brok and Ukena fought each other for power in East Frisia. Both subsequently damaged the privileges and freedoms that the citizens of East Frisia had enjoyed for centuries under the system of Frisian freedom. Under the leadership of the Cirksena dynasty, in cooperation with the Hanseatic city of Hamburg, Focko Ukena was expelled in 1433. While the south of East Frisia was occupied by Hamburg, the Cirksena's consolidated the northern part of the area. The Hamburgers were finally expelled in 1453 and Ulrich I laid the legal foundation for the foundation of a new imperial county; Emperor Frederick III raised Ulrich to the status of imperial count in 1464.

This new county was far from consolidated. Surrounding areas such as Friedeburg, Harlingerland and Jeverland were not yet part of the county and a bitter rivalry arose with the counts of Oldenburg. Under the leadership of Edzard 'the Great', the most famous ruler of the Cirksena dynasty, Groningen and the Ommelanden were conquered. This resulted in the Saxon feud (1514–1517). This seriously endangered his rule in East Frisia and he could barely maintain himself as imperial count. He made renewed attempts to conquer the lordships of Esens, Stedesdorf, Wittmund and Jever.

Around 1520 the Reformation began in East Frisia. Inactivity of the counts Edzard I and his successor Enno II led to a chaotic religious situation in which all kinds of Protestant denominations could take root in East Frisia. In the east, Enno II made a renewed attempt to take over the lordship of Jever. However, he did not honor his marriage treaty with Maria of Jever, after which she managed to free herself from the East Frisian counts through stubborn resistance. In 1575, East Frisia therefore definitively lost the Jeverland to Oldenburg. In the north, Balthasar Oomkens, with the help of the Duchy of Guelders, offered strong resistance, which also kept this area out of the hands of the Cirksena dynasty. Financial problems of the East Frisian counts increased the power of the East Frisian estates. This institution would play an increasingly important role in the history of the county. The rest of the sixteenth century was mainly characterized by religious division and fratricidal strife between Edzard II and Johan II. This even led to a temporary split of the county and further weakening of the count's authority. At the end of the sixteenth century this resulted in the Emden Revolution in which the East Frisian counts definitively lost their authority over Emden and East Frisia increasingly came under the influence of the Dutch Republic.

In the midst of the struggle between the East Frisian counts and the city of Emden, an important event took place in the history of the county of East Frisia. The lordships of Esens, Stedesdorf and Wittmund were permanently bound to East Frisia by the Treaty of Berum of 1600. In exchange for 300,000 Thalers, the sisters Sabina Catharina and Agnes sold the Harlingerland to their father Enno III of East Frisia. However, the area remained outside the power of the East Frisian estates and was only connected to East Frisia in a personal union. In the meantime, the struggle between the East Frisian estates and the city of Emden on the one hand and the counts of East Frisia on the other hand flared up again in all its intensity. This resulted in the Accord of Osterhusen in 1611. As a result, the highest sovereignty in East Frisia now lay with the estates and not with the count. East Frisia also became de facto a vassal state of the Dutch Republic. Dutch garrisons were stationed in Emden and Leerort. Attempts to have East Frisia included in the Dutch confederation failed several times, however.

The Thirty Years' War also didn't leave East Frisia untouched. East Frisia was ravaged by military occupation several times. Sometimes by troops of the Protestant Union and another time by troops of the Catholic League. This led to plundering and destruction throughout the county. Military leaders such as Ernst von Mansfeld tried to gain a position in East Frisia themselves and the county was increasingly exploited by the Dutch Republic. Meanwhile, the counts of East Frisia excelled in administrative incompetence. They were unable to resolve the internal divisions and were only guided by personal profit. Enno Louis of East Frisia succeeded in having himself elevated to the status of Imperial prince in 1654. After the unfortunate rule of him and his brother George Christian of East Frisia, Christine Charlotte of Württemberg, the widow of George Christian, succeeded her husband as ruler of East Frisia. Her efforts to establish an absolute monarchy led to fierce conflicts with the East Frisian estates and the city of Emden. As a result, they decided in 1682 to secretly enter into an alliance with Frederick William of Brandenburg, the powerful ruler of Brandenburg–Prussia.

In 1690, the rule in East Frisia was transferred to Christian Everhard. The Pietist Prince reconciled himself with the East Frisian estates and was even warmly welcomed in Emden. He tried to curb the influence of the House of Hohenzollern by concluding an inheritance treaty with Duke Ernest Augustus of Brunswick-Lüneburg. The Emperor of the Holy Roman Empire, however, blocked this treaty and in 1694 recognized the claim of Frederick III of Brandenburg on East Frisia. Brandenburg took possession of the castle in Greetsiel and increased its influence on the city of Emden. From then on, Emden became Brandenburg's most important naval base and the starting point for establishing overseas colonies.

In 1708, George Albert took over the rule of his father. He too reconciled with the East Frisian estates, which meant that his rule initially remained peaceful. However, due to his illness, the East Frisian chancellor Enno Rudolph Brenneysen gained increasing power and he chose a confrontational attitude towards the East Frisian estates. This attitude, as well as the consequences of the Christmas Flood of 1717, caused increasing tensions in the county. This erupted in the Appeal War of 1726–1727. George Albert achieved a Pyrrhic victory and the mutual relations and divisions reached a low point. George Albert was succeeded by his son Charles Edzard. He grew up in a stifling climate in which he enjoyed no freedom and when he had to succeed his father in 1734 he was absolutely unprepared for this. All kinds of forces in the background began preparations to transfer the county of East Frisia into Prussian hands. On 14 March 1744 the Emden Convention was signed to regulate the transition and only two months later Charles Edzard died as the last male descendant of the Cirksena dynasty. This put an end to the rule of this family over East Frisia that had lasted almost 300 years.

== History ==
=== Foundation of the county (until 1464) ===
==== Rise of the chieftains of Greetsiel ====
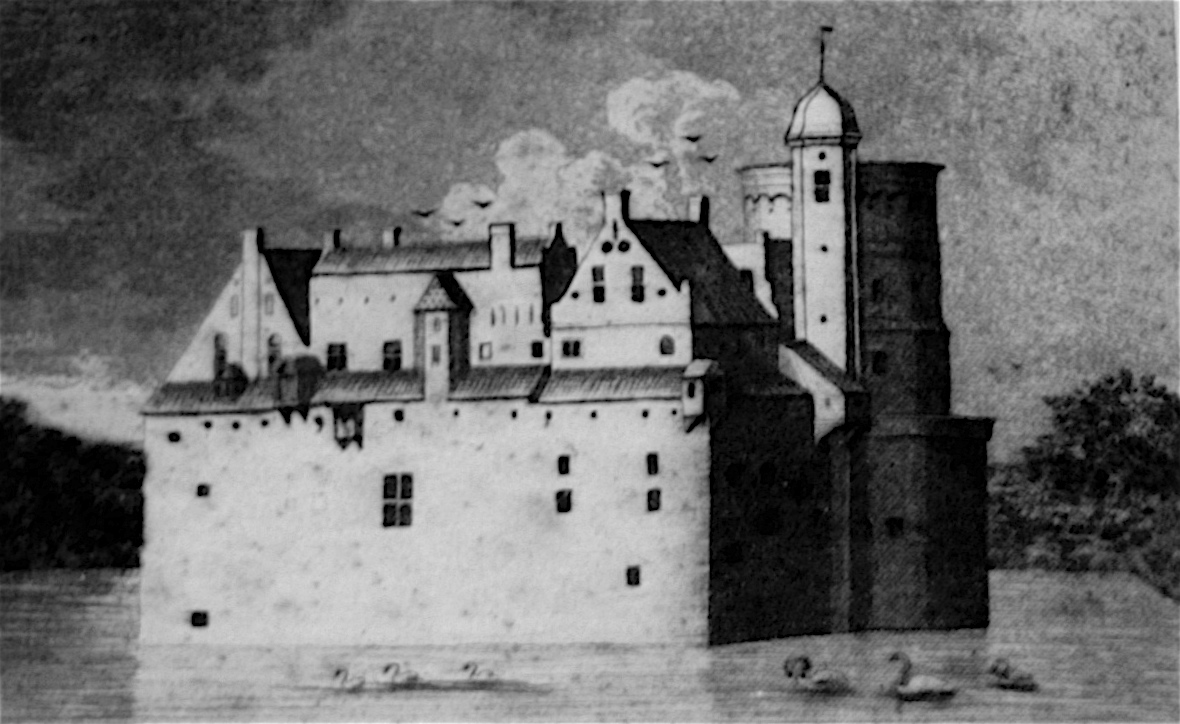
Burg Greetsiel

The establishment of East Frisia as an imperial county began with the chieftains of Greetsiel. Enno Edzardisna (c. 1380 – c. 1450) was chieftain of Norden, Greetsiel, Berum, Manslagt and Pilsum. His second wife was Gela Syardsna of Manslagt. After Gela's only son from her first marriage, Liudward Cirksena, had died, Gela and her cousin, Frauwa Cirksena, were the sole heirs to the rich Cirksena inheritance. Enno Edzardisna managed to secure this rich inheritance by marrying Gela and marrying off his son from his first marriage, Edzard, to Frauwa Cirksena. Enno and Edzard then took the name Cirksena, which laid the foundation for this later so powerful dynasty. The coat of arms of this family, the yellow harpy on a black background, was also adopted. Enno himself had come into possession of Pilsum and Manslagt through his marriage to Gela, while his son Edzard became ruler of Berum. At the beginning of the fifteenth century, a brother of Enno initially resided at the ancestral castle in Greetsiel; Haro Edzardisna. However, he died in 1409 without heirs, causing his property to pass to his younger brother Enno. In 1441, Enno's first son Edzard Cirksena too died without leaving any heirs, causing the entire inheritance to pass to Enno's son from his marriage with Gela: Ulrich.

==== Struggle in the East Frisian lands ====
Enno Edzardisna, together with his sons Edzard and Ulrich, watched with dismay as power in East Frisia was seized by ambitious chieftain families who completely ignored the rights of the local chieftains and peasants. First it was the Tom Brok family who established their rule over East Frisia. Then it was the turn of Focko Ukena who had turned against his former comrade in arms and had himself developed aspirations to establish a dynasty in the lordless East Frisia; a system called Frisian freedom. Initially, Enno joined Focko in his fight against Ocko II tom Brok. To his great disappointment, however, Focko did not restore the traditional freedoms to the many chieftains; he strove for power himself. The Cirksena family responded by uniting the free peasants and chieftains of East Frisia in the so-called "Freedom League of the Seven East Frisian lands". They cornered Focko Ukena. However, to give this chieftain from the Moormerland the final blow, they needed help from outside: the free imperial city of Hamburg. The intervention of this powerful Hanseatic city was decisive in the struggle for power in East Frisia.

==== Intervention of Hamburg ====
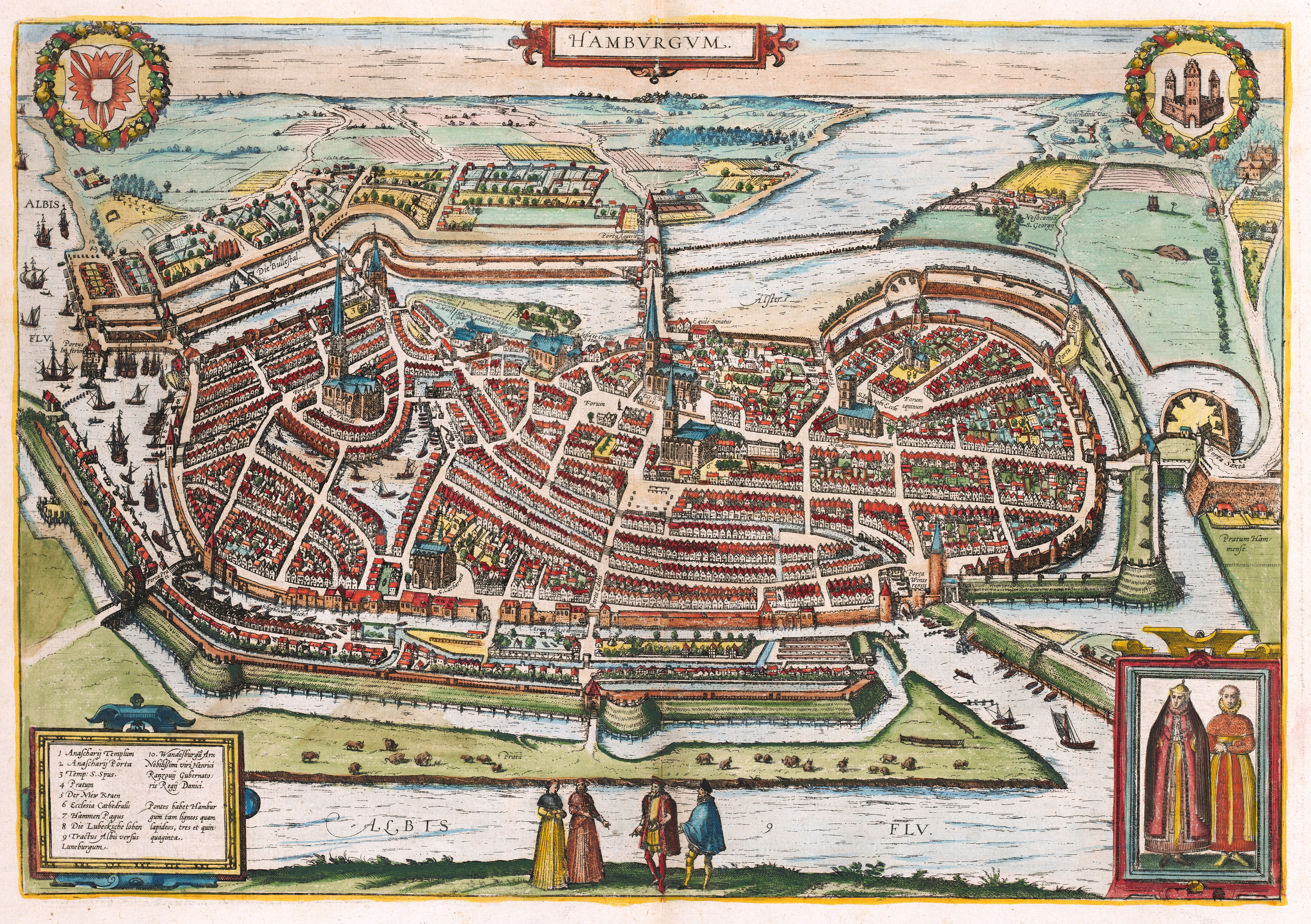
Hamburg in the year 1588, by Braun & Hogenberg

The lawlessness and permanent state of war in East Frisia led to unrest in the surrounding areas. The trading interests of the Hanseatic cities were seriously damaged by the theft of merchandise. The city of Hamburg was therefore keen to restore peace to this coastal region on the North Sea. In 1433, Hamburg and the Cirksena family jointly captured the important city of Emden. In the battle of Bargebur, Focko Ukena was finally defeated, which finally put an end to the violence that East Frisia had been suffering from for decades. The price that had to be paid for this was the end of the system of Frisian freedom that had been cherished for centuries. While the Cirksena family secured its possessions and power in the north of East Frisia, troops from Hamburg occupied Emden and the entire south of East Frisia. This occupation of Hamburg and the lawlessness that had prevailed in the previous decades made the East Frisian population realise that without central authority there could be no peace, freedom and rule of law. This insight was of great benefit to the Cirksena family. They had set themselves up as protectors of the freedoms that the East Frisian peasants had enjoyed for centuries. The fear of falling under the influence of a foreign ruler from a distant country also ensured that loyalty to the Cirksena dynasty was strong among the local population.

In 1439, the occupation of the city of Hamburg in southern East Frisia came to an end. The city transferred its rule to the brothers Edzard and Ulrich Cirksena. The fact that power had to be shared by both brothers was not bad for the city. After all, this made it easier for the city to maintain its influence in East Frisia. Formally, the city of Emden remained the property of Hamburg. Edzard began to take over the rule in Emden and Norden while Ulrich concentrated on Aurich and Esens. However, fate struck Edzard in 1441, which meant that Ulrich came to power alone in East Frisia. Ulrich called himself 'Chieftain in East Frisia' from 1444 onwards. With this he underlined his ambition to become the sole ruler of East Frisia. However, he avoided violence and arbitrariness and respected the laws and customs of the various East Frisian areas. This clever consideration of the strong sense of justice of the East Frisians and his convincing behavior, strengthened the trust in him and thus his authority enormously.

==== Legitimation of the Cirksena dynasty ====
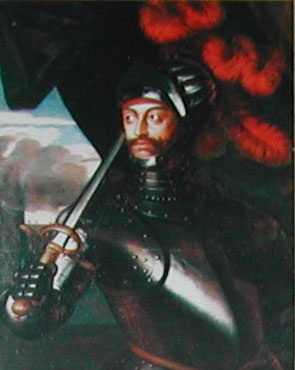
Ulrich I, Count of East Frisia (1464–1466)

Ulrich also took on the role of leader in church affairs. The many churches that had been destroyed during the hostilities were restored under his leadership. This gave church life a new impulse. He also left his mark on the administrative level. He established the council of the city of Emden, expanded the Burg of Emden and built an important border fortress in Detern in the south of East Frisia. In doing so, he alienated the city of Hamburg and the Hanseatic city felt compelled to return to East Frisia in 1447. Ulrich initially accepted this event with resignation. However, the population of East Frisia had no intention of accepting this foreign domination. Gradually, the pressure on Ulrich to free the area from Hamburg's domination increased. This was finally achieved in 1453, although Ulrich had had to make far-reaching political and economic concessions to the Hanseatic city.

In territorial terms, East Frisia was far from a united area. The many villages and towns mostly governed themselves and were merely united under the local laws such as the "Emsiger Landwet". Ulrich used this to his advantage by slowly taking over the judicial power in the Emsigerland. Other chieftains were sidelined in the process. One by one he made the many chieftain families swear loyalty to him in exchange for his support for their claims to their old possessions that had been taken by the city of Hamburg. In this way the East Frisian chieftains slowly but surely lost their power in East Frisia. Only a few families managed to maintain control over the lower jurisdiction by assigning their territory to Ulrich, after which they received it back as a fief. In the north, Ulrich gave his rule in Esens to his nephew; Sibet Attena. This loyal follower of the Cirksena dynasty had seized power in the entire Harlingerland through marriage politics and warfare. In order to also assert his power in the south, he married Theda Ukena in 1455; a granddaughter of his previous enemy Focko Ukena.

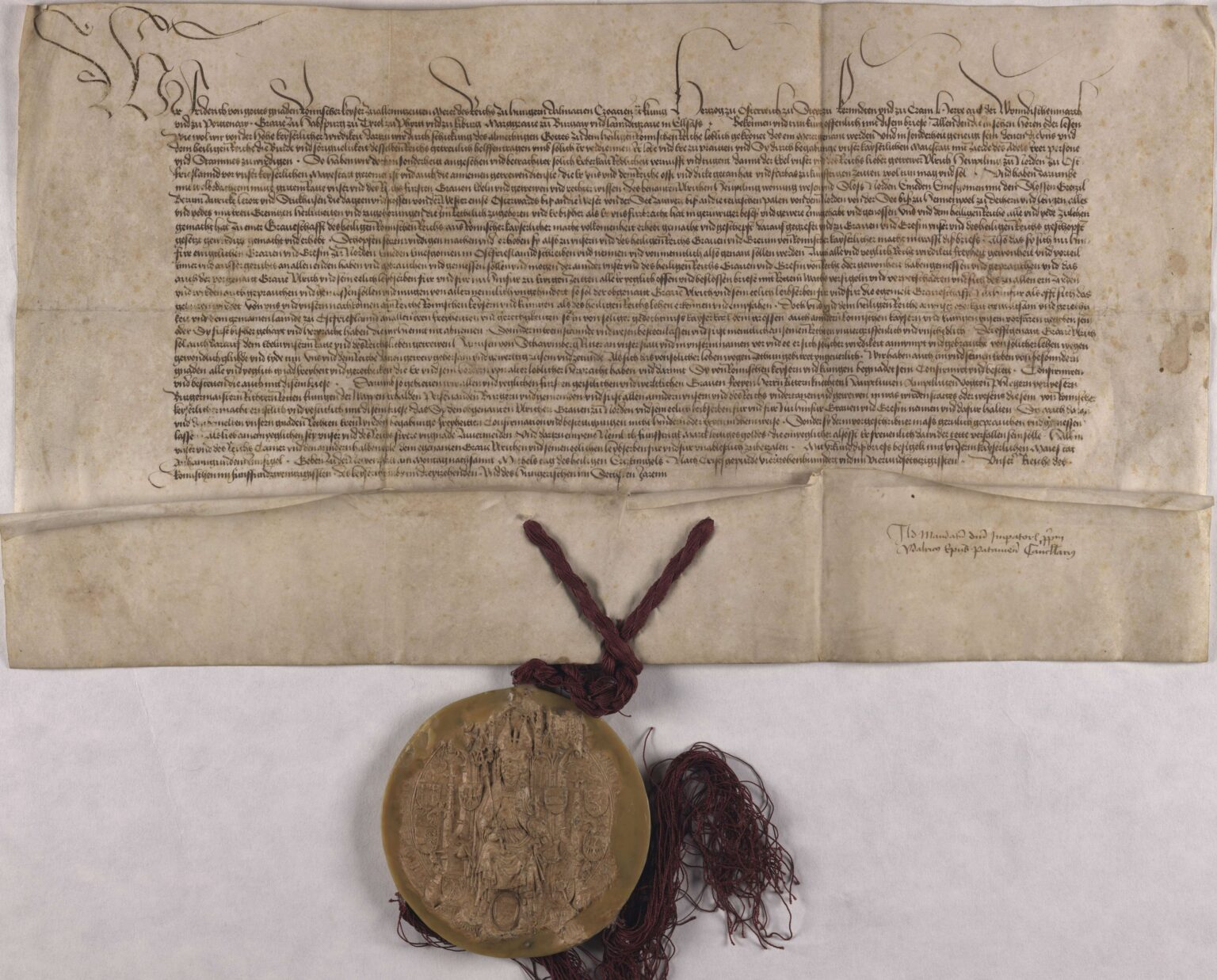
Emperor Frederick III elevates the territory of Ulrich I to the status of county of the empire

Meanwhile, Ulrich continued to try to further weaken Hamburg's authority in East Frisia. However, it was time for Ulrich to turn to other rulers to strengthen his own position in East Frisia and to finally free his subjects from the yoke of Hamburg. To achieve this, Ulrich therefore turned to the emperor of the Holy Roman Empire: Frederick III. On 14 June 1463, the Emperor only recognized his rule in Norden. His possessions in the Norderland were transformed into the County of Norden. A second attempt, however, was more successful. In exchange for a large sum of money, Ulrich was proclaimed "Count in Norden, Emden and Emisgonien in East Frisia" up to the Weser on October 1, 1464. However, Ulrich had to explicitly recognize the freedoms that his subjects had known for centuries under the guise of Frisian freedom. In return, the East Frisians had to recognize Ulrich as their lord. With this appointment, East Frisia was now better protected against claims from, among others, the Prince-Bishopric of Münster; they had a centuries-old claim to the area. After lengthy negotiations, the claims and demands of Hamburg were also swept off the table once and for all. Ulrich and several other chieftains were knighted later that year in the Franciscan church of Emden. Two years later, in 1466, the life of Ulrich I, the first Count of East Frisia, came to an end. Under his leadership, an area that had been plagued by violence for decades was transformed into a territorially coherent whole that was henceforth ruled by the Cirksena dynasty. He had thereby elevated his family above the many other East Frisian chieftains.

=== Consolidation of East Frisia (1464-1491) ===
==== Regency of Theda Ukena and the battle for Friedeburg ====
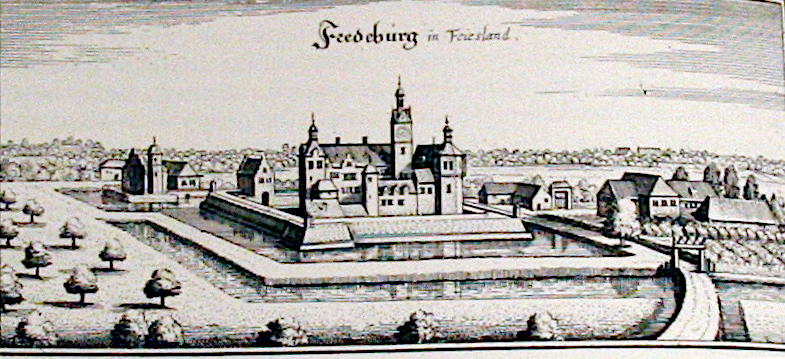
The fortress of Friedeburg in the 17th century

On 27 September 1466, the first count of East Frisia died unexpectedly. Because his three sons, Enno, Edzard and Uko, were still minors, the government of the young county was taken over by his widow Theda Ukena, heir of Focko Ukena. Since the power of the Cirksena dynasty had not yet been fully consolidated, there was fear that the county could fall apart again. However, there was no serious opposition and Theda was supported by the nobles of East Frisia. In particular, Sibet Attena, the ruler of the lordships of Esens, Stedesdorf and Wittmund, supported her regency. This was on the condition that his own area would retain an autonomous position within East Frisia. To the east of Auricherland existed the small, independent lordship of Friedeburg. The local ruler, Cirk of Friedeburg, had allied himself with the counts of Oldenburg. This was a thorn in the side of East Frisia. Theda Ukena wanted to secure the inheritance of her sons and this included the eastern part of the East Frisian peninsula. Theda allied herself with Sibet Attena to stop the Oldenburg expansion to the north. When Cirk van Friedeburg died in 1474, she acted quickly and had the lordship occupied by troops from the County of East Frisia. In doing so, she outwitted both Count Gerhard VI of Oldenburg and Edo Wiemken the Younger of Jeverland. This resulted in bitter enmity with the rulers of Jever. Hero Maurits Kankena was appointed lord of the castle at Burg Friedeburg. However, he was captured by the Oldenburgers and he could only buy his freedom. Theda gave him the money he needed for this, 5,000 Rhenish guilders, in exchange for his rule in Friedeburg. With this, Friedeburg became a permanent part of the County of East Frisia. The Friedeburg Castle became the administrative centre of the Amt of the same name.

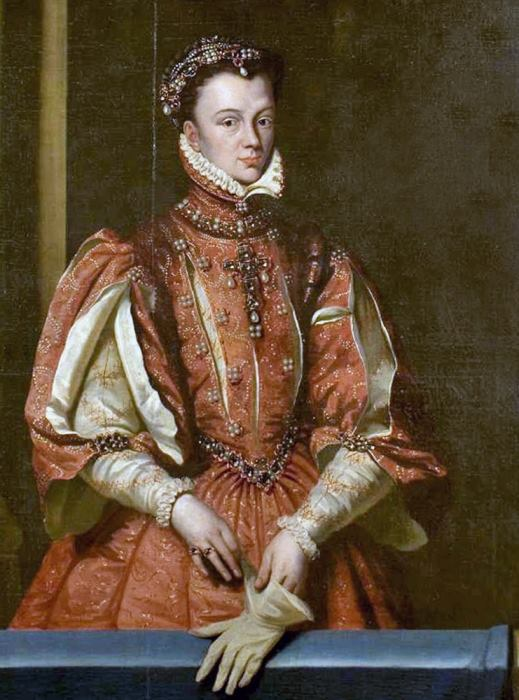
Theda, Regent of East Frisia (1466–1480)

From 1480 onwards, Theda's sons slowly but surely took over the administration of the county. In 1489, her eldest son, Enno I of East Frisia, made a pilgrimage to the Holy Land together with Viktor Frese and Folef of Inn- and Knyphausen. In Jerusalem, Enno was knighted. When he returned to his county, he was confronted with a scandal that seriously jeopardized the honor of his dynasty. His young sister, Heba of East Frisia, had been married off by her mother to Count Eric of Holstein-Pinneberg. By entering into such alliances, the dynastic prestige of the Cirksena family was considerably enhanced and they were thus incorporated into the higher nobility of Northern Germany. The local chieftains of East Frisia were henceforth considered to be unequal in status. A nobleman present at the court in Emden, the Westphalian Engelmann von Hörstel, was appointed drost of Friedeburg and he began a secret relationship with Almuth and "kidnapped" her to the Burg Friedeburg. Theda responded by besieging the castle and she demanded her daughter back. After returning from the Holy Land, older brother Enno also got involved and invited Engelmann for a conversation outside the castle gates. This confrontation ended in disaster when Enno, pursuing Engelmann, fell through the ice with his heavy equipment and drowned. Engelmann eventually fled the country and Almuth was imprisoned.

==== Rivalry with Oldenburg ====
Even before the establishment of East Frisia as an imperial county, there had been a long and bitter rivalry between the East Frisians and the Oldenburgers. The Burg Vri-Jade on the Jade River, built at the beginning of the fifteenth century by the Oldenburg counts Dietrich and Christian VI, was soon destroyed by the East Frisians. In the mid-fifteenth century, however, Count Gerhard VI of Oldenburg built a new castle in order to be able to better subjugate the East Frisians. This led to new hostilities between these fierce rivals. Westerstede and Apen went up in flames and the East Frisians in turn were defeated near Burg Mansingen near Westerstede. In 1462, Gerhard VI had a new border fortress built in Neuenburg in a renewed attempt to subdue the East Frisians. The East Frisian town of Varel had also come under Oldenburg's sphere of influence after the death of the last chieftain of this place. In 1475, the son of Gerhard VI, Adolph, was captured by East Frisia and imprisoned in the castle of Berum. Gerhard VI had made many enemies in the meantime and was severely cornered by surrounding rulers who had had enough of his warfare and piracy. In 1481, Adolph was released in exchange for the western part of the "Friesische Wehde".

=== Reign of Edzard the Great (1491–1528) ===
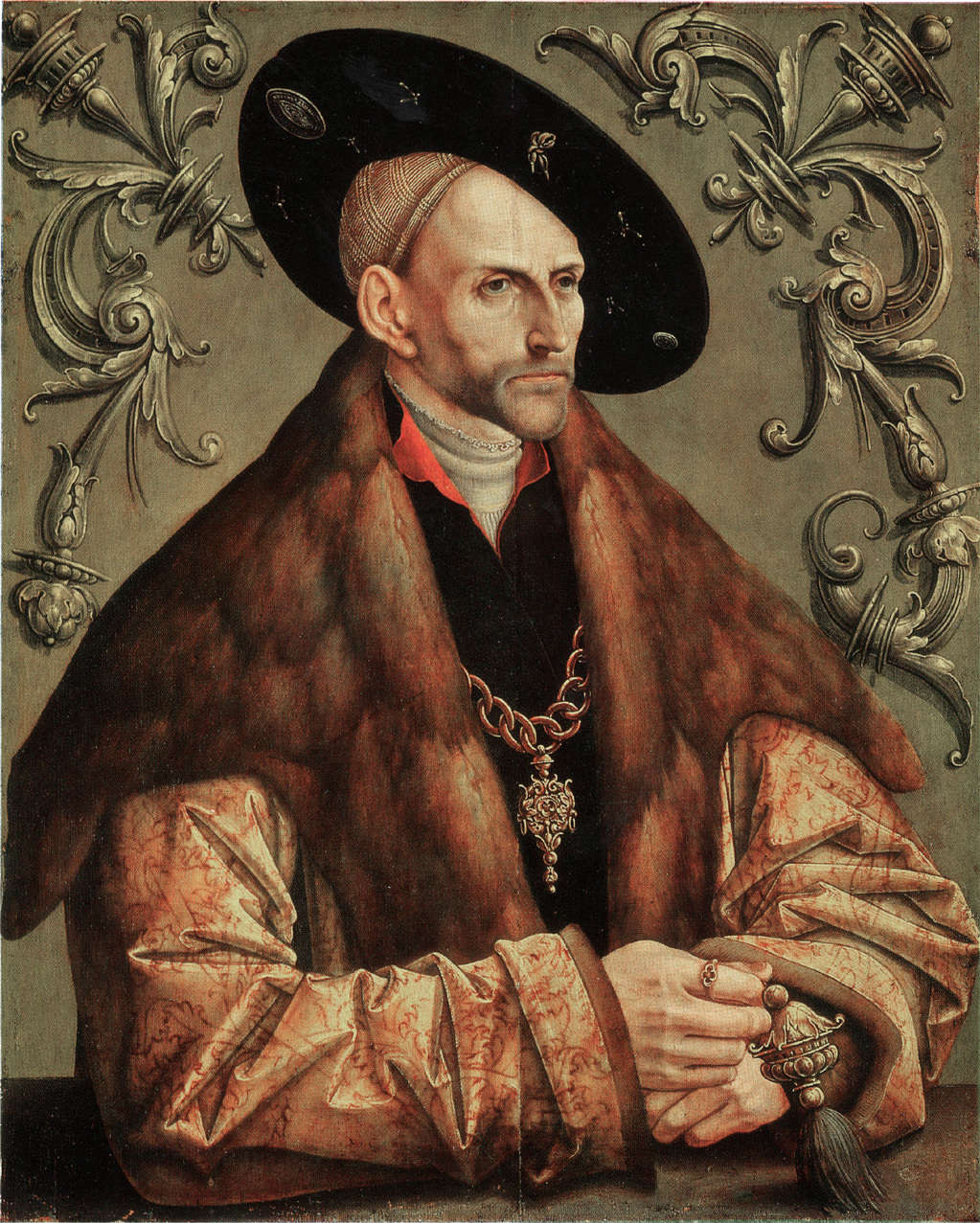
Edzard I, Count of East Frisia (1491–1528)

==== Campaigns in the East ====
In 1491, the rule of East Frisia was taken over by Ulrich's second son: Edzard I. Edzard had also undertaken a pilgrimage to Jerusalem; he returned home shortly after his older brother. The Cirksena rule was far from consolidated when Edzard came to power. In 1464, his father had received the proclamation in which East Frisia was described as extending from the 'Westerems eastwards to the Weser'. However, the eastern part of this area fell outside the sphere of influence of the counts of East Frisia. Edzard, like his father, saw the belonging of the eastern areas to the county of East Frisia as a legal fact that had to be translated into political reality. Edzard therefore began campaigns in the east to make these areas an integral part of his county.

He managed to strengthen his position against the rulers of the areas that were situated to the east of his county and refused to yield to his claims to power by misleading the highest authority in the Empire. In the spring of 1495 Edzard and his brother Uko asked Emperor Maximilian I for confirmation of their rule in East Frisia. As was customary in such cases, this document was cast in the form of a confirmation of an older privilege. However, the young East Frisian counts did not show the imperial chancellery the real charter of 1464, but a false document dated 30 September 1454 that, unlike the general description in the real (but younger) document, contained a precise statement of the areas that still resisted the authority of the East Frisian counts: Esens, Stedesdorf, Wittmund, Jever, Friedeburg, Butjadingen and Stadland. The intention was clear: by mentioning these names, Maximilian I confirmed the claims of the Cirksenas and they could feel strengthened in carrying out their political agenda.

Between 1495 and 1497 he attempted to expel Hero Oomkens from Harlingerland and Edo Wiemken from Jeverland. However, these attempts failed because nearby rulers resisted these attempts to strengthen the county of East Frisia. The Prince-Bishop of Münster, the Count of Oldenburg and the city of Bremen had no interest in a strong East Frisia as a neighbour. Moreover, the local populations of Harlingerland and Jeverland remained loyal to their local rulers. These areas therefore remained outside the reach of the East Frisian counts for the time being.

Edzard had more success further east. Count John V of Oldenburg had subjected the free farmers of Butjadingen and Stadland in the former district of Rüstringen to his rule in April 1499. When they revolted in April 1500, Edzard supported them. Therefore, Butjadingen and Stadland became protectorates of East Frisia and the free peasants submitted to Edzard's rule. The Butjadingers and Stadlanders were thus freed from Oldenburger tyranny for a while.

==== The Saxon Feud ====
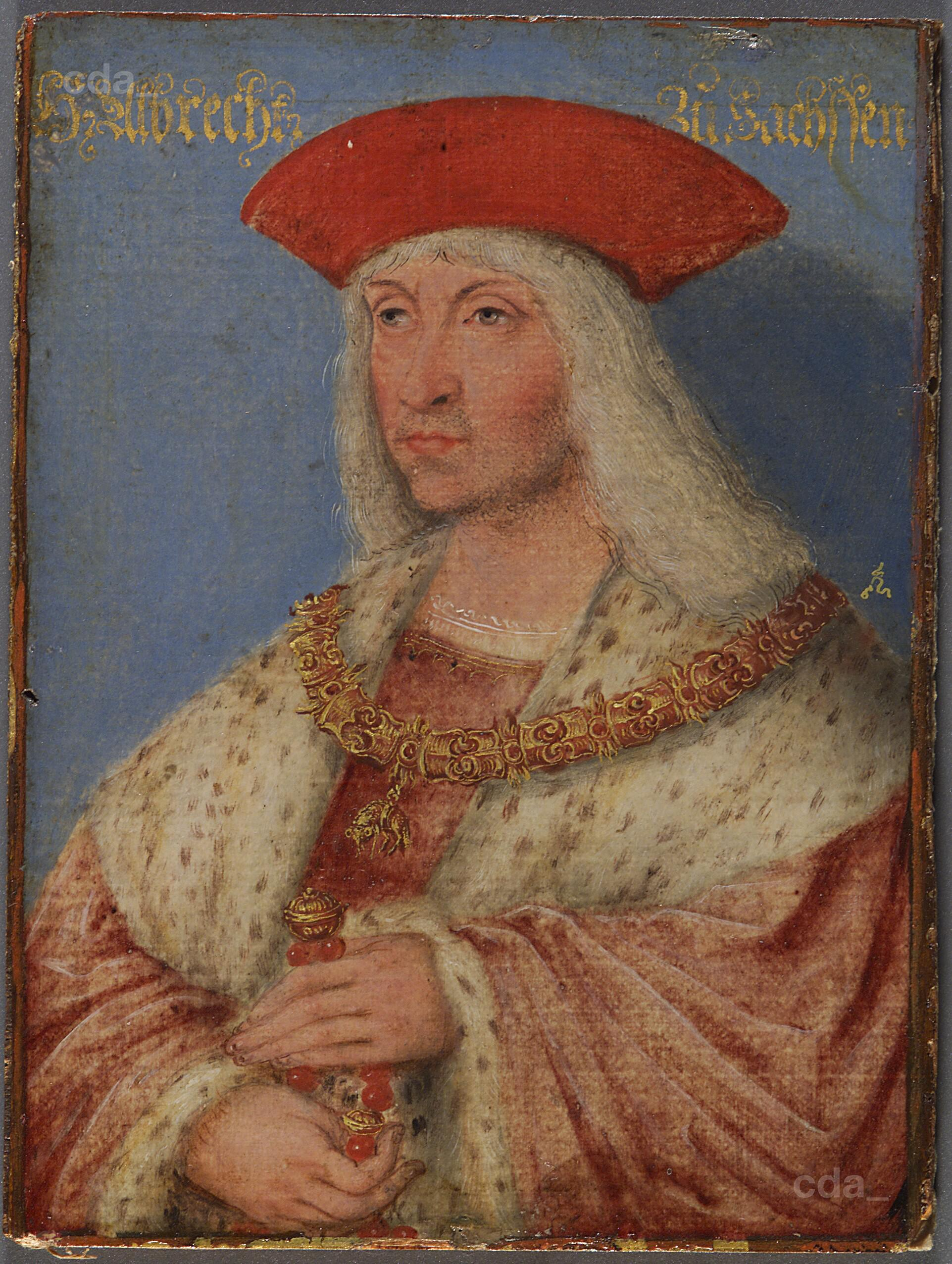
Albert III, Duke of Saxony

West of East Frisia, some opportunities and threats had also surfaced. On 20 July 1498, Duke Albert III of Saxony, was appointed hereditary governor of Oostergo, Westergo, Zevenwouden, the Stellingwerven, the Ommelanden, Dithmarschen and North Frisia by Holy Roman Emperor Maximilian I. On 27 March 1499, East Frisia, the city of Groningen and Butjadingen were added to this. Albert III wanted to leave a large area to his second son, Henry IV, in order to prevent the territorial division of his ancestral territory in Saxony. Moreover, this would establish a strong cadet branch of the House of Wettin on the North Sea coast. Edzard swore allegiance to Albert III and together they set out to subdue the Frisian area west of the Ems. In 1499, Edzard entered the Ommelanden and subjected the local chieftains to his authority. From Appingedam he governed the Ommelanden and the Oldambt. However, the powerful city of Groningen remained out of his reach for the time being. In 1500 Albert III died in Emden, after which his second son, Henry IV, succeeded him. Albert III had only succeeded in establishing his authority in Westergo, Oostergo and Zevenwouden. This area was henceforth known as the Lordship of Friesland. The Frisian area east of the Lauwers remained out of his reach for the time being. Moreover, the Lordship of Friesland was far from consolidated. As late as the spring of 1500 the city of Franeker was besieged by dissatisfied Frisian farmers who were opposed to the taxes imposed by the Saxon dukes. On 30 May 1505 Henry IV had had enough and he ceded all his rights in Friesland to his eldest brother: George. Meanwhile, Edzard I continued to besiege the city of Groningen with the help of East Frisian and Ommelander nobles and farmers who were strongly opposed to this city.

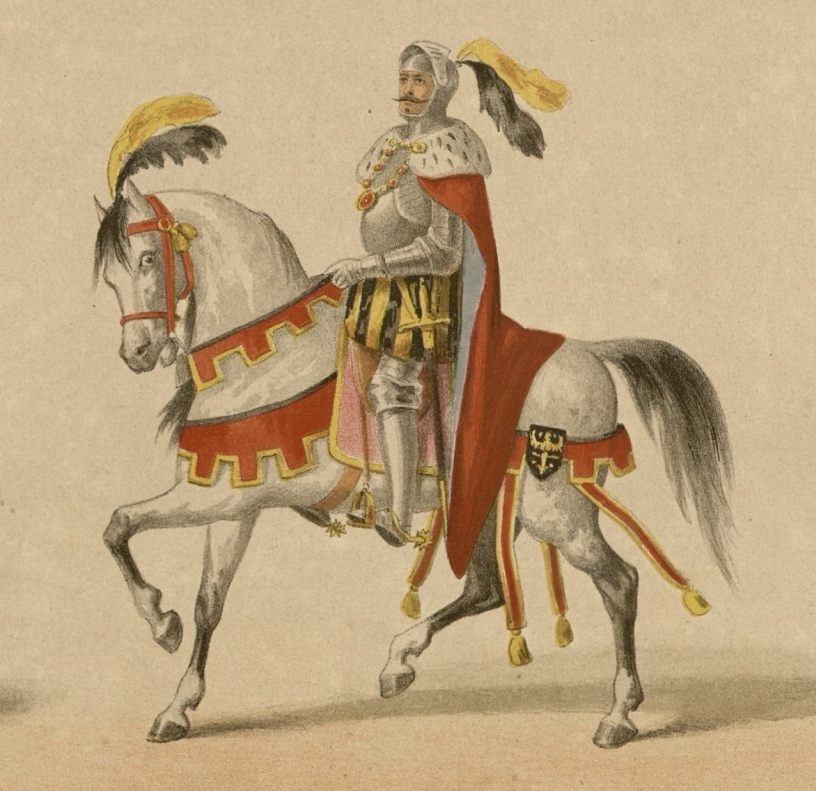
Joyous Entry of Edzard I into the city of Groningen on May 1, 1506

However, in early 1506, the first cracks appeared in the alliance between the Count of East Frisia and the Duke of Saxony. Since the city of Groningen had come under considerable pressure, the city council decided to secretly start discussions to surrender the city to the rule of Edzard I. The cruelties of the Saxons towards captured citizens of Groningen were a deciding factor. And so it happened: on 1 May 1506, Edzard I was honoured as 'Lord of Groningen'. The powerful city of Groningen, which had falsely presented itself as a free imperial city for centuries, fell under a feudal ruler for the first time in a long time. The Saxons reacted confused and angry. It was completely unclear to them with which motive Edzard had taken the city. However, the motives soon became clear. The agreement that the count had made with the city explicitly stated that the city was taken in the name of the Holy Roman Empire, that the city would retain all its old privileges and freedoms and that the city would never be surrendered to the Saxons. Soon after the inauguration, Edzard began to fortify the city by building a castle with moats, thick walls, strong gates and towers. The Saxons were told that this was only a temporary solution until the legal status of the city of Groningen was clarified. The Saxons were powerless to stop Edzard I so they reluctantly accepted the situation for the time being. Moreover, the Saxons were terrified that Edzard would use the momentum to push through and also liberate Friesland west of the Lauwers from Saxon rule. After all, the Saxon dukes were not popular with the local Frisian population. On 5 August 1506, the situation was formalised by appointing Edzard as 'stadtholder' of Groningen and the Ommelanden in the name of the Saxons. In reality, Duke George had very little say in the area east of the Lauwers. In the following years, dissatisfaction with the situation increased at the Saxon court. The Saxons publicly accused Edzard of treason and tried to obtain support from the rest of the Holy Roman Empire. The situation remained tense and Edzard ignored one request after another for clarification from the Holy Roman Emperor. In the meantime, several West Frisian nobles were accused of treason by the Saxons. In November 1512, Gerbrand Mockema, Jemme Herjuwsma and Kempo Roeper were executed on suspicion of conspiring with Edzard. Attempts at reconciliation between the Saxons and the East Frisians failed time and again and a long-term solution was not found.

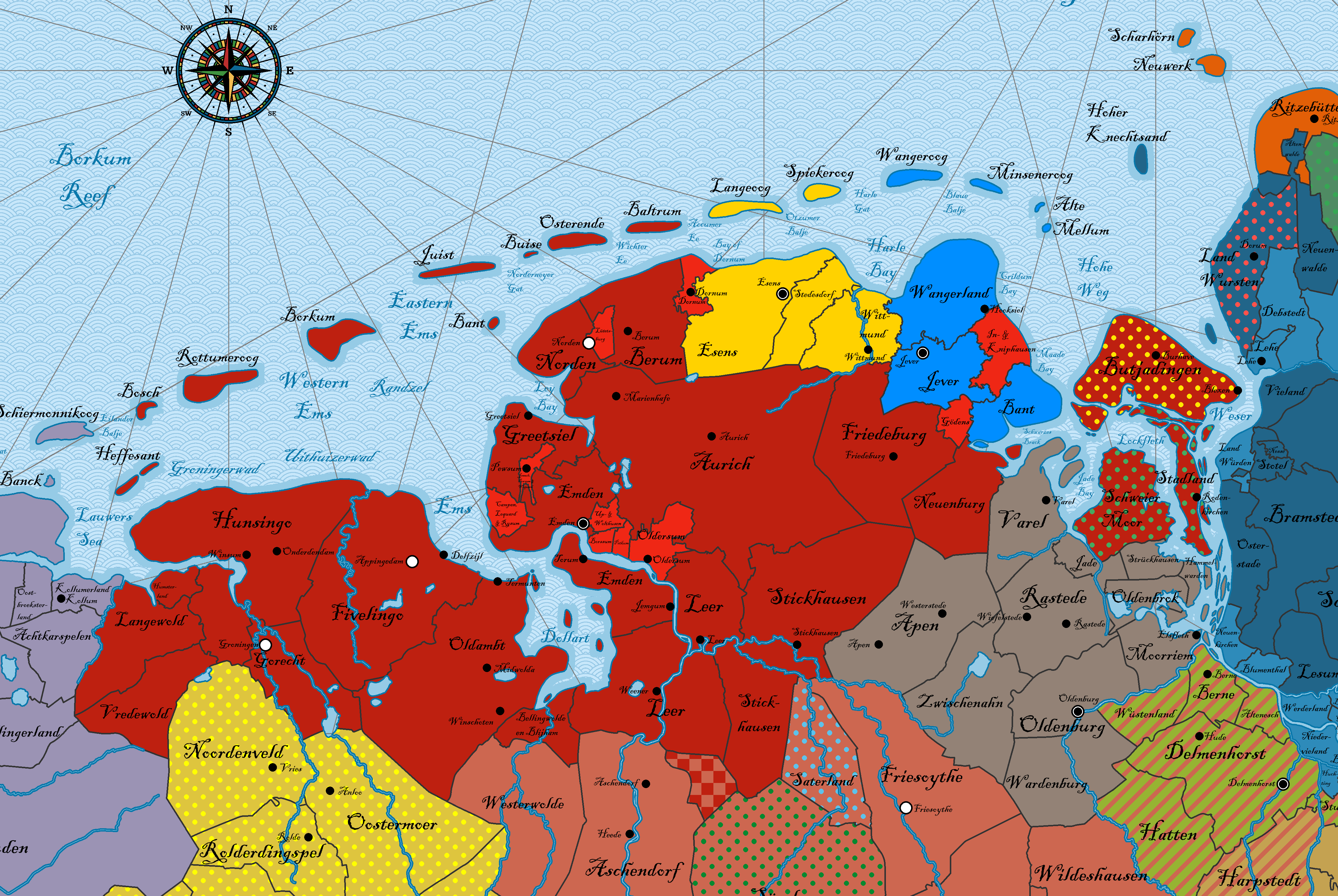
The reign of Count Edzard I of East Frisia in the year 1508 (areas under his control are shown in red)

Count Johann IV of Holstein and Schauenburg attempted to resolve the conflict peacefully in 1512. Counts Johann IV and Edzard I were brothers-in-law; John IV's brother, Eric I of Holstein and Schauenburg, was married to Heba of East Frisia, sister of Edzard I. John IV also had strong ties to the higher nobility in the northwest of the empire. He proposed a marriage between a daughter of Edzard I and a son of the powerful Guelph Duke Henry I, Duke of Brunswick-Wolfenbüttel. A marriage with the Guelph dynasty would have greatly increased the prestige of the Cirksenas and perhaps brought this powerful dynasty to the side of East Frisia. The dowry was set at 12,000 Rhine guilders, with an additional investment of 4,000 Rhine guilders. Furthermore, Johann IV attempted to mediate in the conflict between Edzard I and the Duke of Saxony. A payment of 200,000 Rhine guilders to Duke George of Saxony would have allowed Edzard I to retain possession of Groningen and the Ommelanden. However, Edzard I had no intention of paying such a sum to legitimize his de facto rule west of the Ems. The sum of 16,000 Rhine guilders for a marriage alliance with the Guelph dynasty was also too high for him: he considered a sum of 8,000 to 9,000 Rhine guilders more appropriate. This, however, was a grave insult to Duke Henry I and a huge affront to the most powerful dynasty in the northwest of the Holy Roman Empire. As a consequence, Edzard I drove the Guelphs into the hands of his enemies.

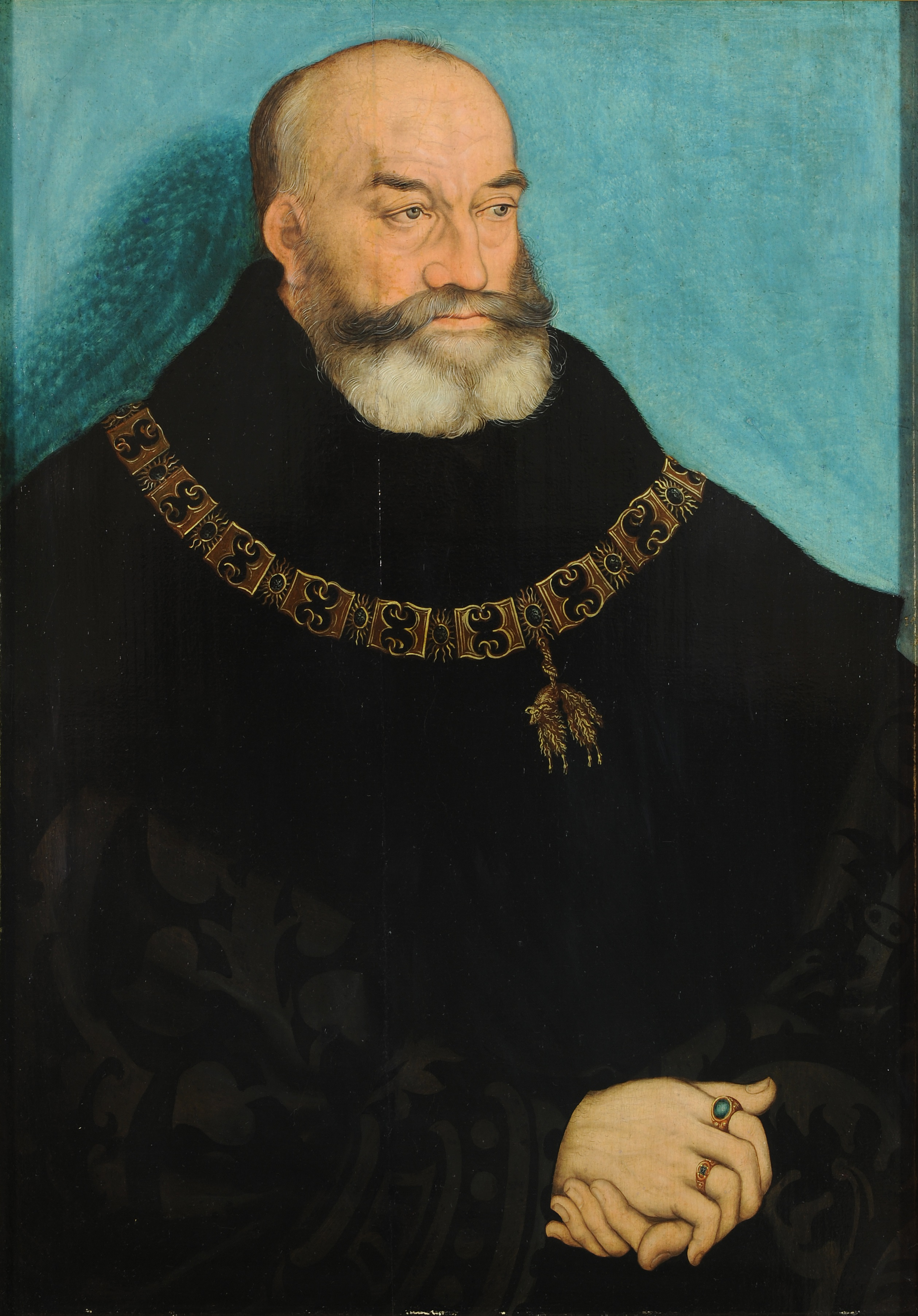
George, Duke of Saxony

In 1514, the limit of what the Saxons could accept was reached. In January of that year, the years-long truce between the Saxons and the East Frisians ended. Both parties prepared for war. Castles, cities and forts were made ready. Saxon mercenaries surrounded the city of Groningen, cutting it off from supplies. Surrounded by his enemies, Edzard I found himself in a dire situation. As a last resort, he therefore sought overseas support. He sent envoys to the free peasants of Dithmarschen and the powerful Hanseatic city of Hamburg. In 1494, Edzard I had already tried unsuccessfully to appeal to Dithmarschen in his fight against Hero Oomkens of Harlingerland and Edo Wiemken of Jever. Edzard I urged the free peasants not to abandon him again. Moreover, he reminded them that, once East Frisia had fallen, Dithmarschen would likely be next. After all, the Dukes of Saxony had also been promised authority over Dithmarschen in the emperor's decree of July 20, 1498. The Hamburg city council reminded Edzard I of the Duke of Saxony's hostility to their interests in the Elbe estuary. Hamburg's commercial interests might also be threatened; East Frisia was a ready market for Hamburg beer, and this could well change with a new ruler. Despite all these arguments, neither the free farmers of Dithmarschen nor the Hamburg city council were willing to support Edzard I's struggle. On 10 April 1514, a final attempt was made to prevent war. However, the discussions came to nothing. Frisian nobles and farmers west of the Lauwers were heavily taxed to finance the war preparations. When the preparations were completed, Duke George crossed the Lauwers: the Saxon feud had begun and war had broken out. In the meantime, the Saxon duke had formed alliances with enemies of East Frisia. The Count of Oldenburg, the Welfish Dukes of Brunswick-Lüneburg, Hero Oomkens of Harlingerland and Edo Wiemken of Jeverland and others took the opportunity to settle old scores. To make matters worse, Edzard was imposed an Imperial ban in 1513. This made him an outlaw and he got into very serious trouble. In the east, Oldenburg and Brunswick-Lüneburg moved into Stadland and Butjadingen. At the Battle of the Hartwarder Landwehr, the free Frisians were defeated, plundered and robbed. Frisian freedom was here definitively over. Initially, Oldenburg and Brunswick-Lüneburg governed Stadland and Butjadingen jointly. In 1523, however, the areas finally came under Oldenburg's control. In the south, Duke Henry IV of Brunswick-Lüneburg besieged the fortress of Leerort. This sealed his death: Henry IV was hit by a cannonball and beheaded. The troops of Brunswick-Lüneburg then withdrew from Leerort and headed towards Groningen. At the same time, Hero Oomkens and Edo Wiemken advanced from the northeast. East Frisia was thus attacked from several fronts and Edzard found himself in a very precarious position. The important city of Aurich was completely reduced to ashes. Villages such as Dornum, Marienhafe and Gödens were destroyed. Castles in Stickhausen, Friedeburg and Kniphausen were occupied. Attempts to conquer Oldersum failed, however. In 1515 the tide began to turn and Edzard regained the initiative. The castle in Großsander was recaptured and he was better able to resist the overwhelming force. In the meantime, the Saxons and Brunswickers had advanced further into the Ommelanden. The administrative centre of the Ommelanden, Appingedam, was captured on 5 August 1514. In the days following the capture of Appingedam, all the men of the city were slaughtered. This went down in history as the Bloodbath of Appingedam. The actions of Duke Henry V of Brunswick-Lüneburg, who wanted to avenge the death of his father at Leerort, caused death and destruction in the city. As a result, the Welfs of Brunswick-Lüneburg began to withdraw; their goals had been achieved.

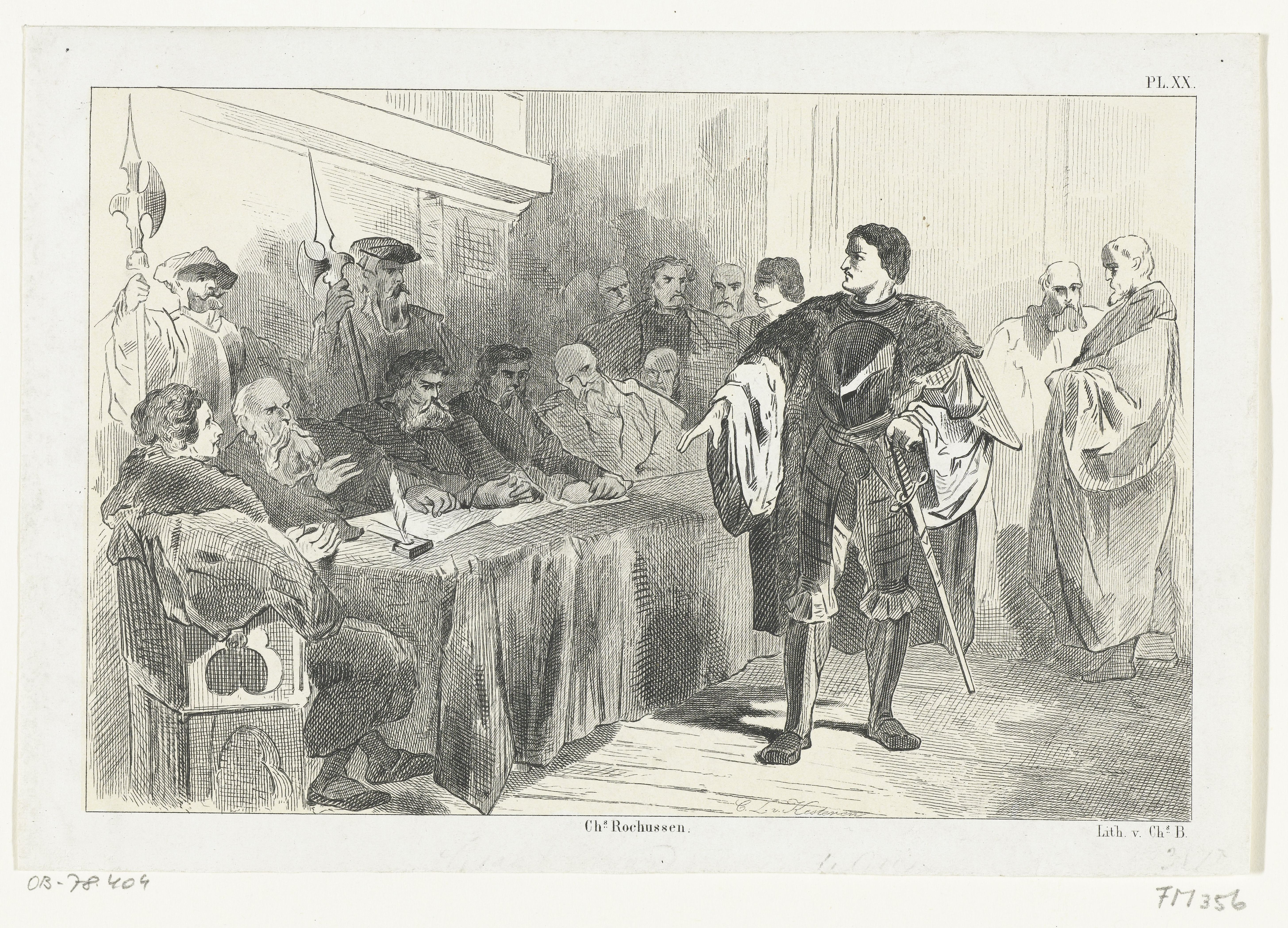
Count Edzard I of East Frisia before the council of Groningen in 1514

The city of Groningen was severely affected by all the events. It was surrounded on all sides and it felt that Count Edzard could no longer protect it against the Saxon claims on the city. The city decided to negotiate with the Saxon duke. However, the strict conditions set by the Saxons were non-negotiable for Groningen. Edzard also saw that he could no longer protect Groningen and he advised the city to turn to the powerful Duke of Guelders: Charles II. This ended the East Frisian adventure on the other side of the Ems. Edzard had his hands full defending his own East Frisian county against this enormous superiority, which forced him to abandon his dream of asserting his rule up to the Lauwers. This put an end once and for all to the possibility of founding a sovereign Frisian state that extended from the Vlie in the west to the Weser in the east. On 19 May 1515, George of Saxony had also had enough of his Frisian adventure. The war had cost the Saxon treasury a fortune and had yielded nothing lasting for the House of Wettin. Duke George sold his rights to Frisia to Charles V, the lord of the Habsburg Netherlands and the future emperor of the Holy Roman Empire. At the beginning of 1517, Edzard succeeded in retaking the fortress in Friedeburg. In addition, negotiations were started with the imperial authorities and Edzard was released from the Imperial ban that had previously been imposed on him. With this, peace was concluded with the Empire. In the east, too, peace was restored after three long years of war. On 3 December 1517, the Peace of Zetel was concluded between East Frisia on the one hand and Oldenburg and Brunswick-Lüneburg on the other. It was agreed that the Lordship of Jever would come into East Frisian hands, while Stadland and Butjadingen were left to the Oldenburgers. The East Frisians also returned the western part of the 'Friesische Wehde', which they had conquered from Oldenburg in 1481. With that, peace had returned to the war-torn East Frisia.

==== Institutional reform ====
In 1517 Edzard was back to square one. He had managed to maintain himself in his county. However, he had gotten into financial trouble due to the war, which forced him to ask the Estates of East Frisia for financial help. This would be the beginning of a long and destructive conflict between the lord of East Frisia on the one hand and the East Frisian estates on the other. At the beginning of the sixteenth century, however, the relations between the count and the Estates were still good. He respected the local privileges and freedoms that the East Frisians were used to. He also left the property of the local nobility untouched. However, he did try to limit urban autonomy. Edzard made many efforts to stabilize the domestic order and increase prosperity. He also further developed local law by establishing new police regulations. He also designed a new East Frisian Landrecht in order to modernise the administration of his county and adapt it to the demands of modern times. In doing so, however, old Frisian legal traditions were honoured as much as possible. In 1527, he introduced the right of primogeniture for his dynasty. He wanted to prevent his successors from becoming involved in dynastic succession problems; a fear that turned out to be not unfounded. In the last years of his rule, the Reformation entered East Frisia. Edzard did not take a leading role in this, which led to a proliferation of various Protestant denominations. This was the start of the unique religious character of East Frisia in later times.

==== Subjugation of Harlingerland and Jeverland ====
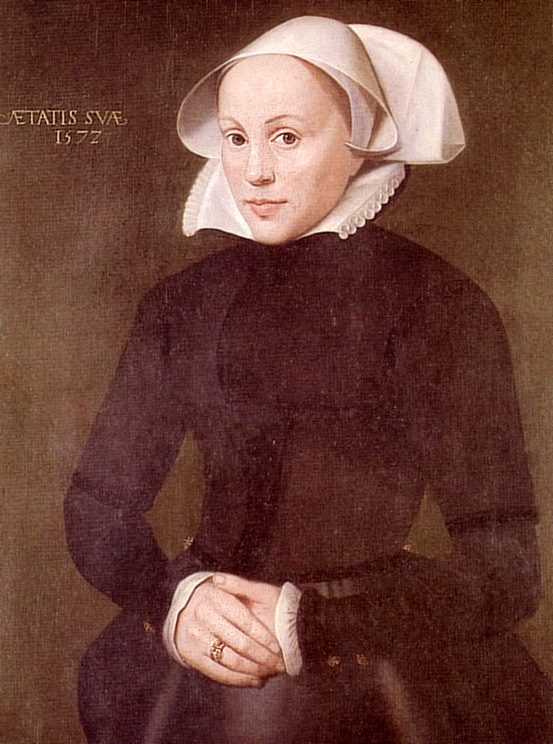
Maria, Lady of Jever (1517–1575)

In 1517, the last male heir of the Wiemken dynasty that had ruled over Jeverland, Christopher of Jever, died. Edzard saw his chance, after a failed attempt in 1495–1497, to bind this lordship to East Frisia once and for all. The inheritance of Edo Wiemken the Younger was left to his daughters Anna, Maria and Dorothea. Edzard did not hesitate for a second and, in cooperation with the regents of Jeverland, imposed his rule on them. Jever was now under East Frisian control. In order to legitimize this rule, he hatched a plan to have the three daughters of Edo Wiemken marry his own sons. These marriage plans were to be realized within seven years. Until then, the lordship of Jever would come under East Frisian rule. The dikes of Jeverland were repaired after disastrous storm floods and Edzard defended Jever against claims by Balthasar Oomkens, the son of Hero Oomkens. In the meantime, Edzard's eldest son, Ulrich, had been declared mentally ill. His marriage to his eldest sister, Anna of Jever, was therefore cancelled. The younger sons, Enno II and Johan I, did not adhere to the marriage agreements and in 1527 they had themselves inaugurated as rulers of Jever instead. Maria, now the last surviving daughter of Edo Wiemken, was severely damaged in her noble honour.

North of East Frisia, the lordships of Esens, Stedesdorf and Wittmund still had a sovereign status; a thorn in the side of Edzard who would have preferred to incorporate the area into his county. The local ruler, Balthasar, made many enemies in northwestern Germany by damaging overseas trade and issuing letters of marque. Merchant ships from Bremen in particular fell victim to this. Because Balthasar remained Catholic during the early years of the Reformation, he received support from powerful Catholic rulers such as the Prince-Archbishop of Bremen and the Duke of Guelders. Count Edzard tried to put an end to the hostilities by launching a military campaign in 1524. Balthasar was banned from piracy and he had to submit to Edzard's authority. As this was subsequently ignored, Edzard started a new military campaign in 1525. This time Edzard was more successful and peace returned to the north.

=== Weakening of the count's authority (1528–1611) ===
==== The Reformation in East Frisia ====
Enno II, like his father Edzard I, took no responsibility for the religious developments in East Frisia. His passivity in this area led to a chaotic religious situation in which all kinds of Protestant denominations could develop. As early as 1519, the Lutheran doctrine was preached in Oldersum and Aurich. Still under the reign of Edzard I, the Colloquy of Oldersum was organized in June 1526 by Ulrich von Dornum. This was a religious discussion between the preacher Georg Aportanus from Emden and the Catholic Dominican prior Laurens Laurensen from Groningen. A report of this event, written by Ulrich von Dornum, led to the rapid acceptance of the Reformation in East Frisia. The beginning of the reign of Enno II was marked by confiscation and appropriation of church property throughout East Frisia. Many religious buildings and institutions disappeared from the map and many libraries and archives were completely destroyed. As a result, many valuable sources on the Middle Ages in Frisia were lost forever. Enno II was not concerned with religious piety, but only with material gain. At the end of his reign, he seriously considered the re-Catholicization of East Frisia.

==== Loss of the northeastern part of the peninsula ====
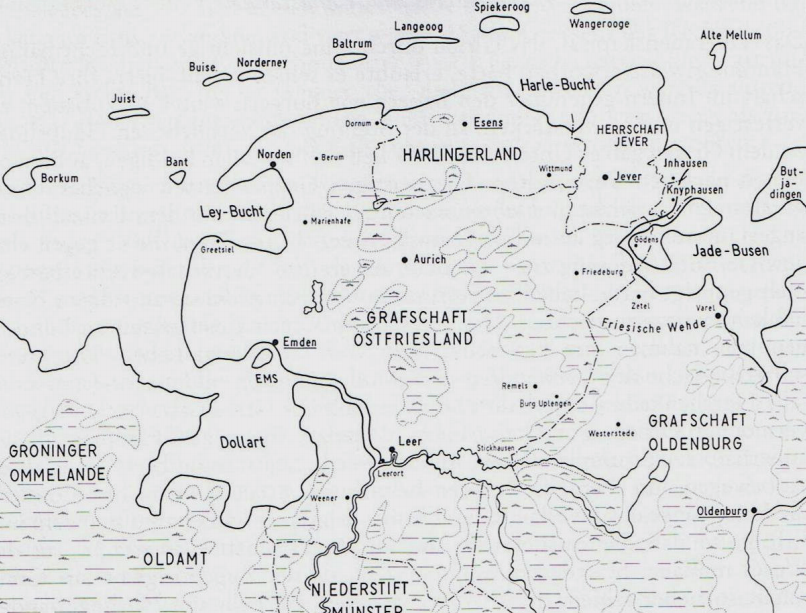
East Frisia in the 16th century

The successor of Edzard I, his son Enno II, tried to realize the dream of his grandfather Ulrich I and expand his county towards the east of the East Frisian peninsula. After the inauguration of Enno II and Johan I as rulers of Jever, they appointed the lord of Oldersum, Boing, as stadtholder of the Jeverland. They had absolutely no intention of adhering to the marriage treaty that their father had concluded with the female heirs of Jever. They assumed that they could make the Jeverland part of their county for good through a display of military power. However, they had not counted on the stubborn resistance of Maria of Jever. In the midst of this struggle, Boing of Oldersum chose to change sides. He became a loyal follower of Maria of Jever and he turned against the East Frisian counts. In 1531 he expelled the East Frisian garrison in Jever and thus ended the occupation of the Jeverland by Enno II and Johan I. He was also driven by love for Maria. Initially he was engaged to Margarethe von Dornum, the daughter of Ulrich von Dornum. However, this engagement was annulled and Boing remained nearby as a faithful follower of Maria.

In 1530, Enno II married Anna of Oldenburg, the daughter of John V of Oldenburg, and thus a scion of the House of Oldenburg, with whom the House of Cirksena had been at great odds for decades. The marriage was intended to end the rivalry once and for all and to ease the tensions in the region. Christopher and Anthony I of Oldenburg were strongly in favor of this marriage treaty, while the brothers John VI and Georg of Oldenburg were against it; they did not see the counts of the House of Cirksena as equals, which was due to the relatively recent elevation of this dynasty to the status of imperial counts. However, John VI was removed from power and the rapprochement finally took place. On 26 October 1529, the Treaty of Utrecht was signed. Part of this treaty was a double marriage in which Enno II married Anna of Oldenburg and Anthony I married Anna of East Frisia. However, this last marriage could not take place due to the early death of Anna. Part of this treaty was also that Oldenburg relinquished Jever while East Frisia relinquished Butjadingen and Stadland on the Weser. These areas were thus definitively lost to Oldenburg.

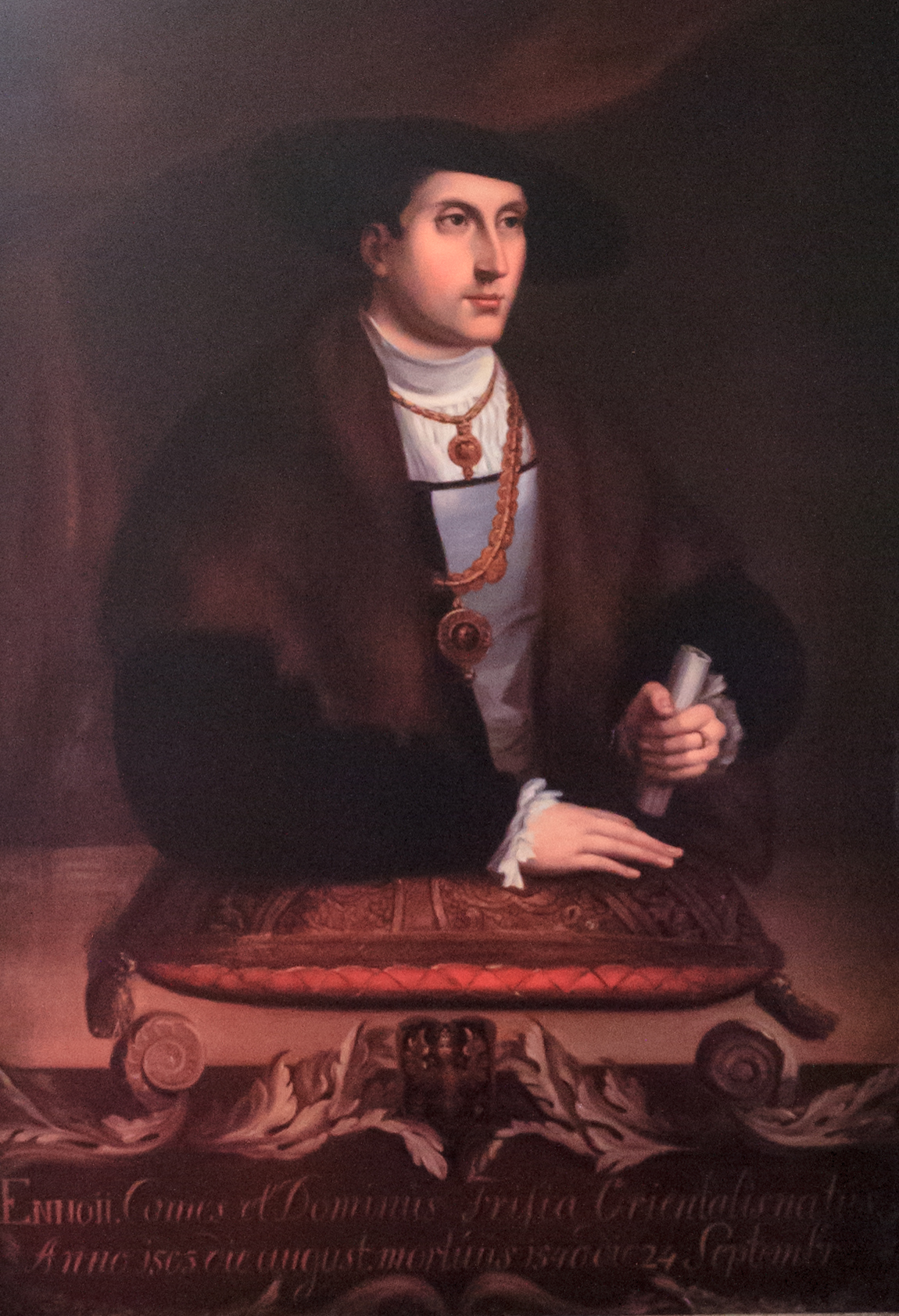
Enno II, Count of East Frisia (1528–1540)

The money that had been earned by plundering churches and monasteries enabled Enno II to start a renewed military campaign in the north. The lordships of Esens, Stedesdorf and Wittmund were still not part of East Frisia and the local ruler, Balthasar, resisted the East Frisian counts. In 1530 the entire Harlingerland was occupied and Balthasar fled to his sister Onna of Esens in Rietberg. From here he left for the court of Duke Charles II of Guelders. Balthasar gave his territory in Harlingerland in fief to Charles II after which he gained his support to reconquer the area from East Frisia. The conflict between East Frisia and Harlingerland thus became part of the broader conflict called the Guelders Wars. The battle of Jemgum in 1533 was lost for East Frisia and troops of Guelders burned down many East Frisian towns and villages. Enno II had no choice but to accept Balthasar's claims in Harlingerland and to acknowledge his defeat.

In 1531 a friendship treaty was concluded between Maria of Jever and Balthasar of Esens, Stedesdorf and Wittmund. The two rulers were cousins and they had a common enemy in the counts of East Frisia. Maria also turned to the court of Charles V. As Duke of Brabant and Count of Holland he took possession of Jeverland and then gave it as a fief to Maria of Jever. In this way she was assured of support for her rule. East Frisia protested strongly against this course of events but to no avail; on 26 January 1534 the East Frisian claims were definitively rejected. An attempt was made to reach a compromise whereby Maria of Jever would marry Johan I. Maria, however, rejected this and demanded that Boing of Oldersum be reinstated. On 26 June 1540, the hostilities finally came to an end. The Treaty of Oestringfelde was drawn up in which Enno II recognized Boing of Oldersum as an honorable man. A marriage between Boing and Maria could now take place. However, any child resulting from this marriage would be obliged to marry a descendant of the Cirksena dynasty.

Balthasar of Esens, Stedesdorf and Wittmund watched these developments with dismay and even before the treaty between East Frisia and Jever was signed, he invaded Jeverland on 15 June. Maria was protected by Enno II and together they drove Balthasar out of Jever. Shortly afterwards, Balthasar died, which meant that the danger had passed. However, during the siege of Wittmund, Boing of Oldersum also died, which meant that the planned marriage with Maria could not go ahead. This left Maria of Jever alone as the ruler of Jever. The lordships of Esens, Stedesdorf and Wittmund passed to the counts of Rietberg after Balthasar's death.

==== The rise of the East Frisian estates ====
As far as is known, Enno II's father financed his own enterprises. However, Enno II himself got into serious financial trouble. This was partly caused by the fact that Enno II's brother, Johan I, demanded a large compensation for the fact that he could not expect a substantial inheritance because of the introduced primogeniture. Johan I had always supported his brother Enno I and recognized the inheritance law that his father had established. However, he did want financial compensation. In 1538, the amount was set at 100,000 Guilder. This made Enno II seek support from the Estates of East Frisia. This assembly of the representatives of the estates of the realm met only very rarely and irregularly under Edzard I. However, Enno II's financial problems meant that the count needed their support. As everywhere in Europe, the financial problems of the local rulers were inversely related to the power of the Estates. This would be the beginning of a long-lasting struggle between the counts and princes of East Frisia on the one hand and the Estates of East Frisia on the other.

==== Religious pluralism and the regency of Anna of Oldenburg ====
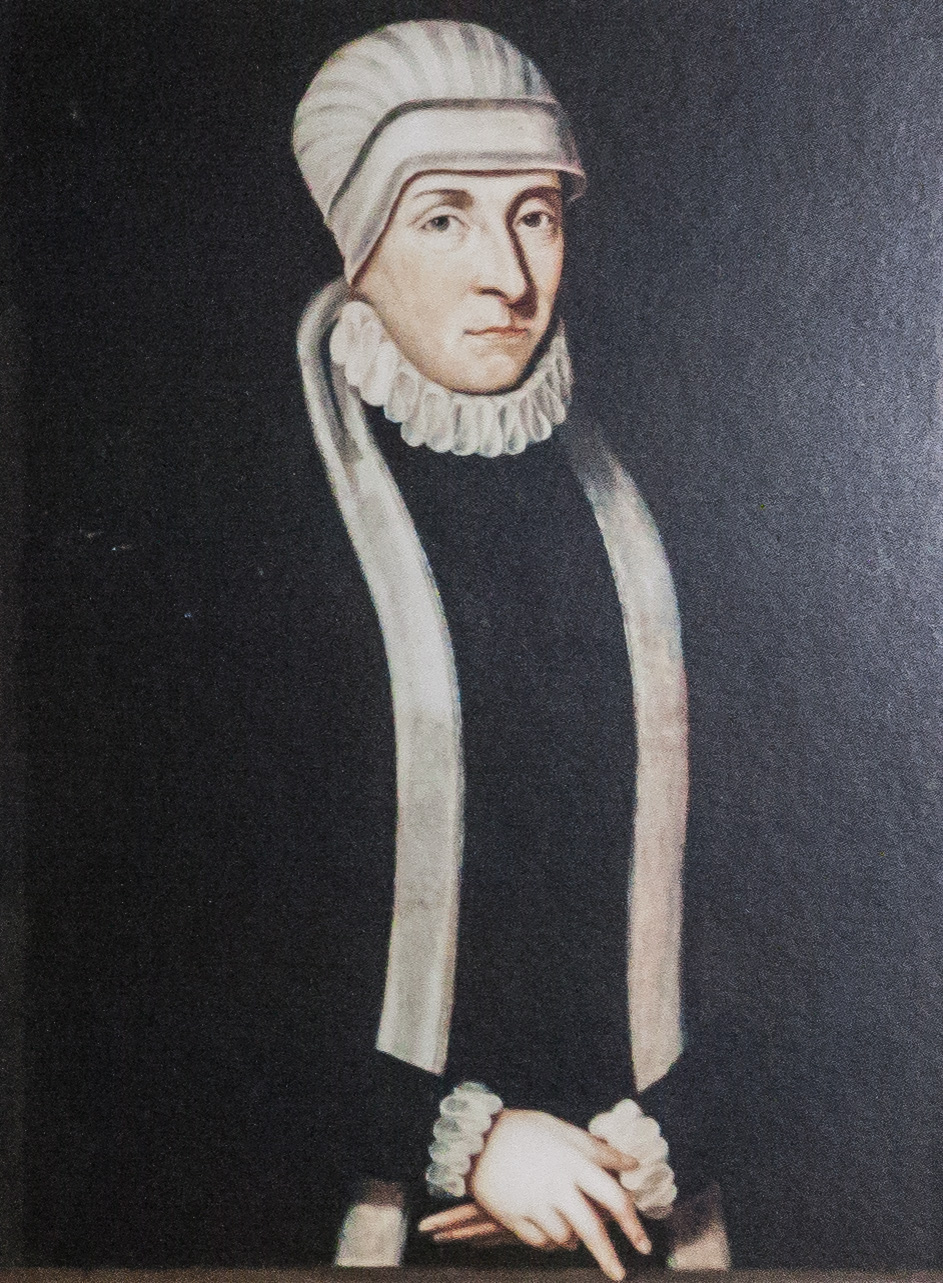
Anna, Regent of East Frisia (1540–1561)

In 1540, Anna of Oldenburg took over the rule of East Frisia from her husband Enno II, who died on 24 September of that year. Unprepared and inexperienced, she was completely dependent on the support of the East Frisian nobility. She also had to defend herself against interference from her brother-in-law Johan I. Her regency was supported by her brother Christopher of Oldenburg. In religious terms, she opted for a confessionally neutral system. This was unique in the Holy Roman Empire. After the Peace of Augsburg of 1555, the policy of the empire was that the religion of an area was determined by the ruler of that area: cuius regio, eius religio. In East Frisia, however, several different Protestant denominations such as Lutheranism and Zwinglianism existed side by side in relative peace. The Reformation was thus given free rein in East Frisia. Tensions elsewhere in the empire increased. In 1531 the Schmalkaldic League was founded and in 1546 the Schmalkaldic War broke out. However, Anna remained loyal to Holy Roman Emperor Charles V. Since 1548 the county's administration was reorganized and in this the confessional neutrality was always observed in order to maintain internal peace in East Frisia. She founded the police force in East Frisia in 1545, reformed the legal system. Next to its administrative tasks, the chancellery was given judiciary tasks. Councillors and legal scholars were added to the chancellery to carry out these tasks. The chancellery was mostly a court of appeals, but would also act a court of first instance in cases involving the nobility.

Furthermore, the sons of Anna and Enno II, Edzard II, Christopher and Johan II received a solid education. In 1558, she abolished the primogeniture that Edzard I had established for the House of Cirksena; instead, power was to be shared between her three sons. All three sons were thus recognized as counts of East Frisia. This was meant to prevent Swedish dominance in view of the wedding between her son Edzard II to the daughter of Swedish king Gustav Vasa; princess Catherine Vasa of Sweden in 1559. It also implied a continuation of the religious balance, with Johan II being a Calvinist and Edzard being Lutheran and neither of them able to establish their faith as the only religion allowed in the county. Anna of Oldenburg was also in negotiations with Joachim II, Prince-elector of Brandenburg, about a marriage between her son Johan II and a Brandenburg princess. This would put East Frisia in a stronger position vis-à-vis the Spanish who held power in the Netherlands. However, Joachim II was of the opinion that Johan II, without his own county, did not have the appropriate status to marry one of his daughters. However, a division of the county of East Frisia was not negotiable for the Swedish king Gustav I.

==== Fraternal strife and the division of the county ====
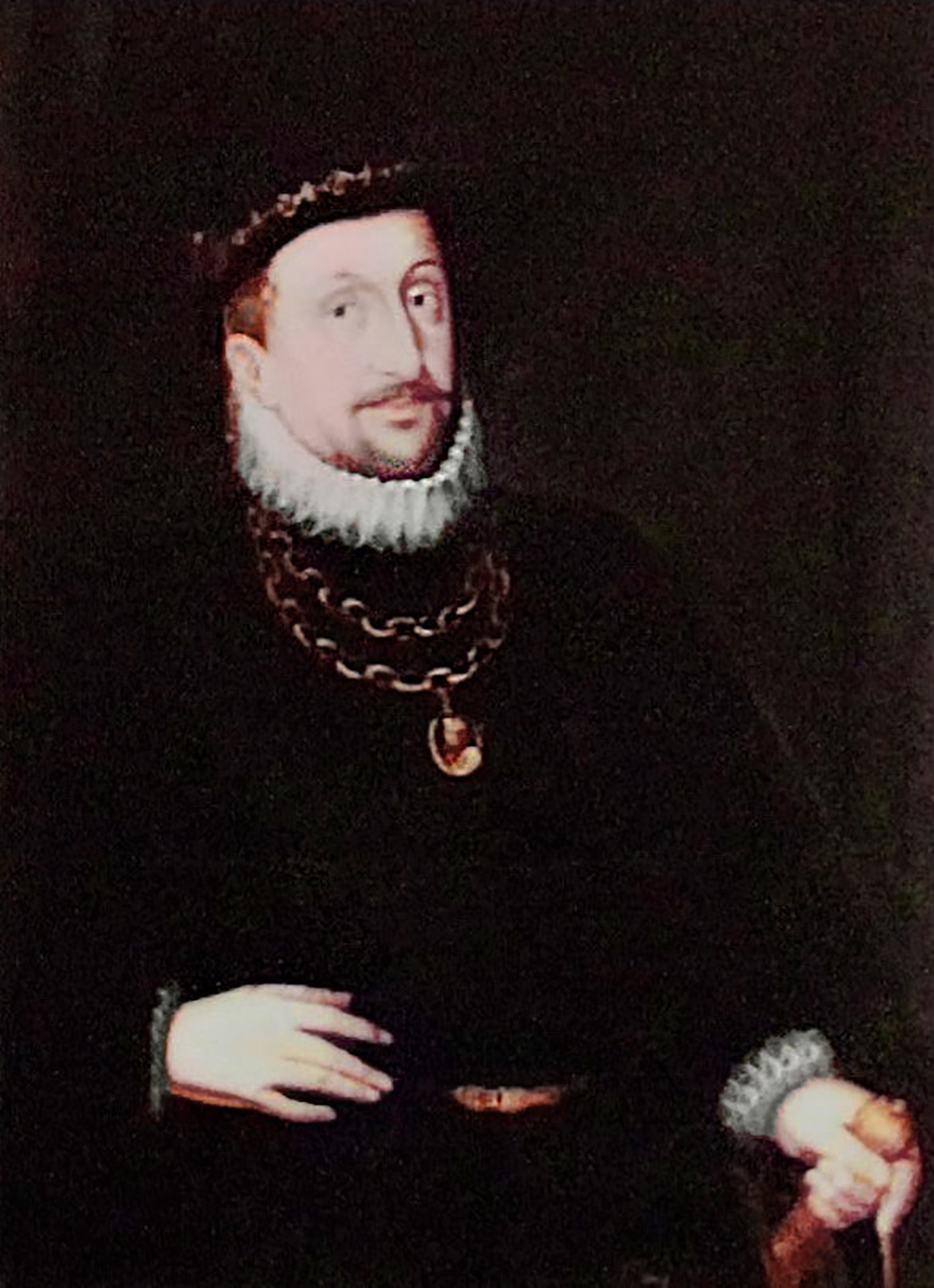
Edzard II, Count of East Frisia (1561–1599)

The regency of Anna of Oldenburg lasted until 1561. After that, the rule in East Frisia was taken over by her three sons. Her eldest son, Edzard II, had married Catherine Vasa in 1559. The Kingdom of Sweden had broken away from the Kalmar Union in 1523. Under the leadership of Gustav Vasa, an independent Swedish kingdom had thus emerged. The Swedes sought a base on the North Sea that was outside the sphere of influence of the Kingdom of Denmark. Trade relations were also established and, as the icing on the cake, Edzard II was allowed to marry a king's daughter. None of his successors would ever again marry a wife of such high rank and status. In 1561, Edzard II returned to East Frisia with his wife, brother Johan II and sister-in-law Cecilia. On the way, they stayed at Vadstena Castle with the brother of the Swedish princesses; Magnus, Duke of Östergötland. There, Johan II had an affair with Cecilia. This led to a serious scandal that would go down in history as the Vadstena Rumble. Only after tough negotiations were they allowed to return to East Frisia.

Back in East Frisia, a fierce fraternal rivalry began as a result of the abolition of primogeniture. Although Christopher died of typhus in 1566 during the Habsburg–Ottoman war of 1565–1568, in which he participated, Edzard II and John II became embroiled in a bitter struggle over the county of East Frisia. The two could not reach an agreement on their joint rule, so in 1570 they brought the matter before the Holy Roman Emperor. A special commission was set up to resolve the matter, but this bore no fruit; in 1578, the matter was therefore referred to the Estates of East Frisia. They agreed to a division of East Frisia: Johann II received the predominantly Calvinist ämter of Leer, Greetsiel and Stickhausen. Edzard II obtained the - predominantly Lutheran - remaining districts. Due to the administrative chaos in East Frisia, Holy Roman Emperor Rudolf II issued a decree in 1589 stating that without the participation of the East Frisian estates no fundamental changes could take place, no new taxes could be collected, that the state treasury would be managed jointly and that a court of justice should be established in which both the Estates and the Count would have a say. This was the definitive rise of the power of the East Frisian estates. After the death of Johan II in 1591, Edzard II obtained sole rule in East Frisia. However, his authority was severely weakened by the fraternal strife and the events would have a lasting impact on the authority of the counts of East Frisia.

==== The Emden revolution ====
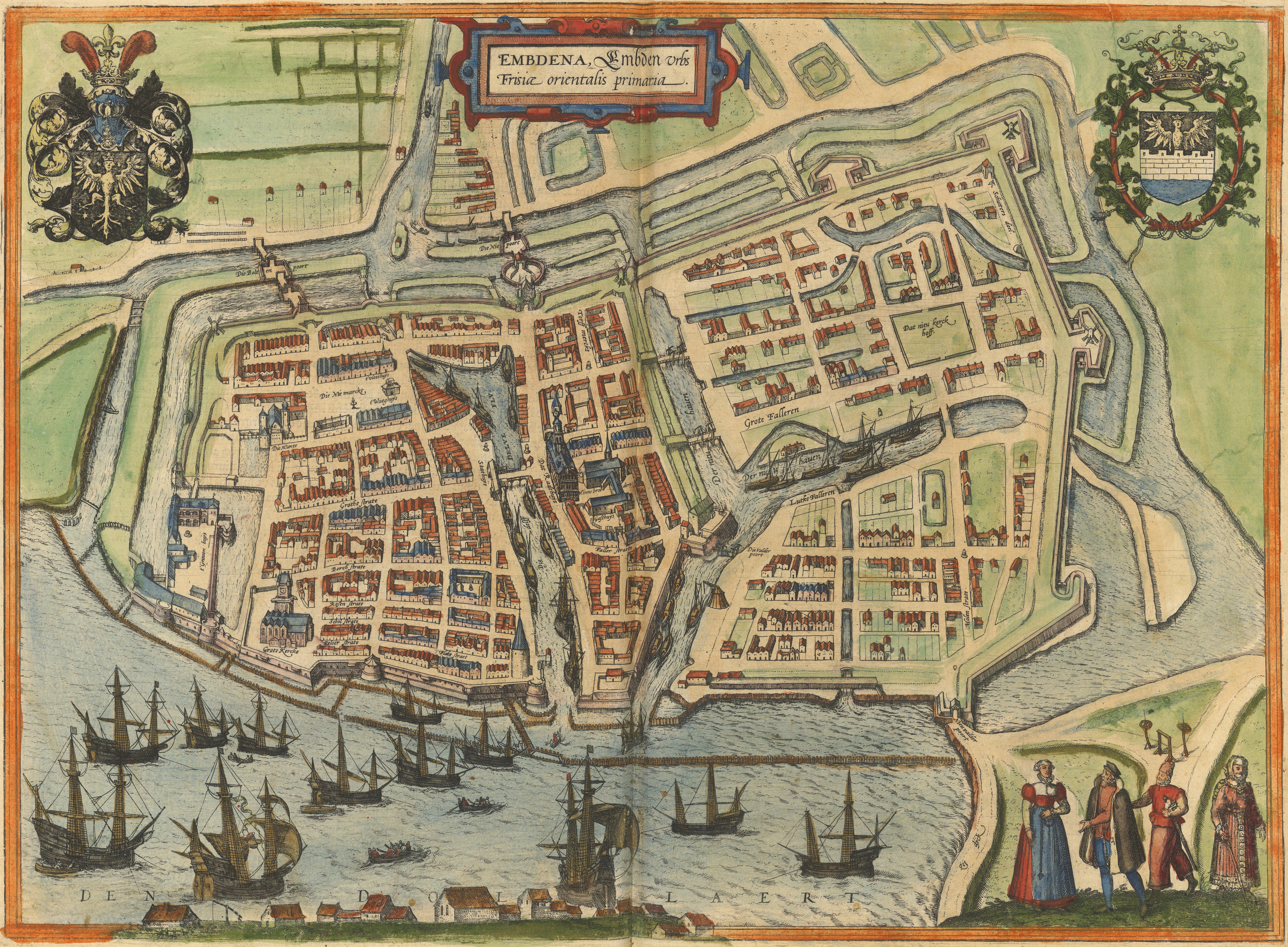
Emden in 1575, by Braun & Hogenberg

In the meantime, a fierce struggle had also arisen in the Netherlands. The Dutch, who had adopted the Calvinist faith, had rebelled against Philip II of Spain. The Spanish king tried to suppress the uprising but failed: the Eighty Years' War was a fact. To escape the hostilities, many Calvinists fled to Emden. This city therefore received an enormous influx of traders and religious leaders who changed the character of the city enormously. Edzard II reacted passively and let it happen. He only intervened in the matter concerning the Jeverland. In 1575, Maria of Jever died, after which Edzard II tried to add the area to his county. However, the Count of Oldenburg, John VII, acted quickly and took over the lordship of Jever. Edzard II then secretly entered into an alliance with Philip II of Spain. Philip II needed Edzard II in the battle in the Netherlands and Edzard needed support in his attempt to incorporate Jever. The only tangible thing Edzard II gained from this was an annual pension paid by the Spanish king.

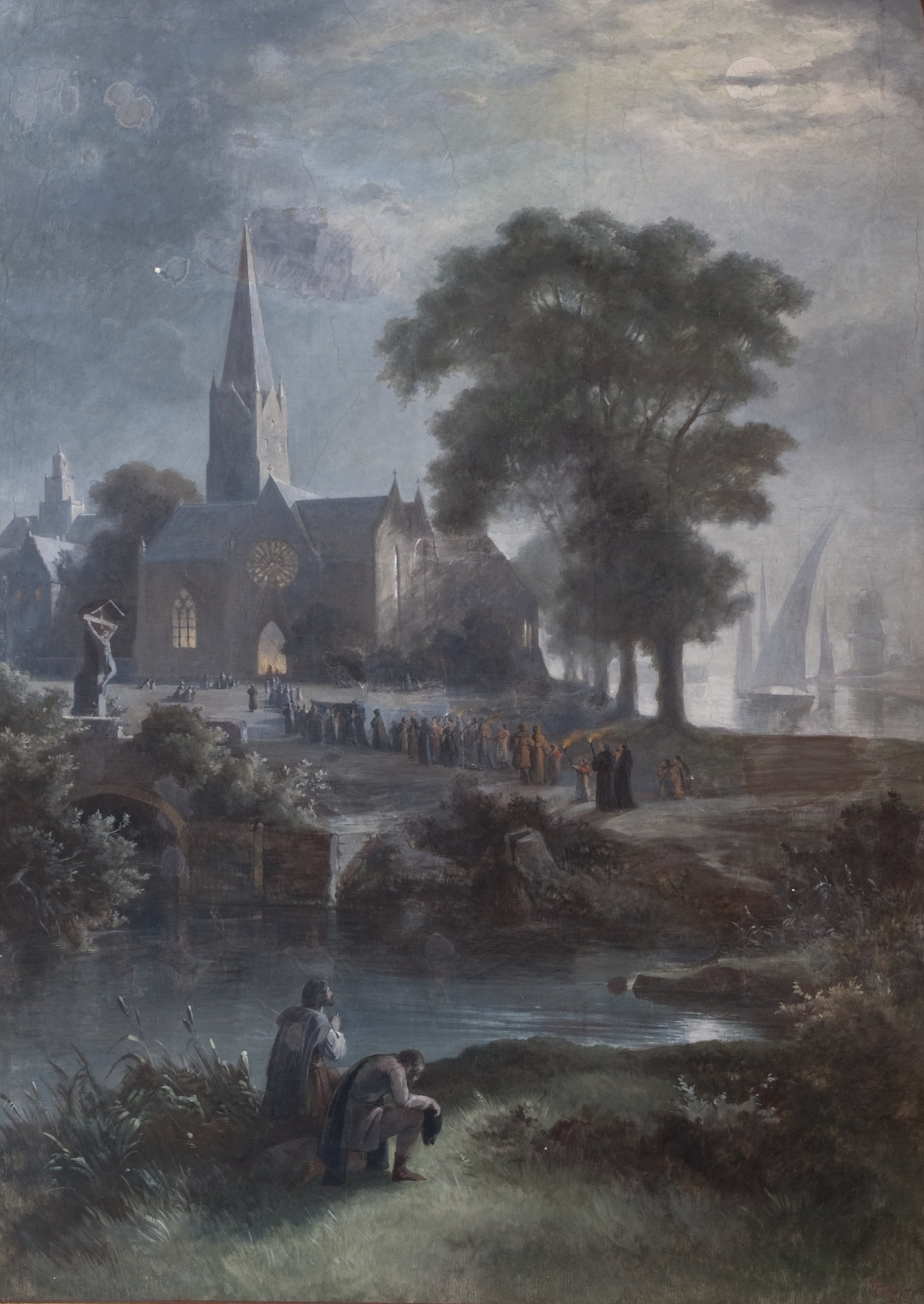
Great Church of Emden, by Friedrich Preller the Younger

In 1595 Edzard II had to endure the next humiliation. On 18 March of that year, the citizens of the city of Emden revolted against the count, after he had once again increased the tax burden on its citizens. The inhabitants of the city, which by now had a strong Calvinist character, were incited by Menso Alting, the reformed vicar in the Great Church in Emden. The city council that had been established by Edzard II was expelled and the count's castle, Burg Emden, was occupied: the Emden Revolution was a fact. The year before, on 21 January 1594, the Holy Roman Emperor had issued a decree ordering the citizens of Emden to recognize their count, stop the violence, and dismantle the new city government. The citizens refused and persisted in their rebellion. Since the city was under strong Dutch influence, Edzard II sent his chancellor to The Hague to ask how the Dutch authorities viewed the conflict. The Dutch Republic attempted to mediate in the conflict. Since Edzard II had lost all authority, he offered the States General of the Netherlands to include East Frisia as the eighth province in the Dutch confederation. This was, however, refused. On 7 November 1595, a peace treaty was signed in Delfzijl by the city, the count and the Estates. Edzard had to renounce most of his rights in Emden.

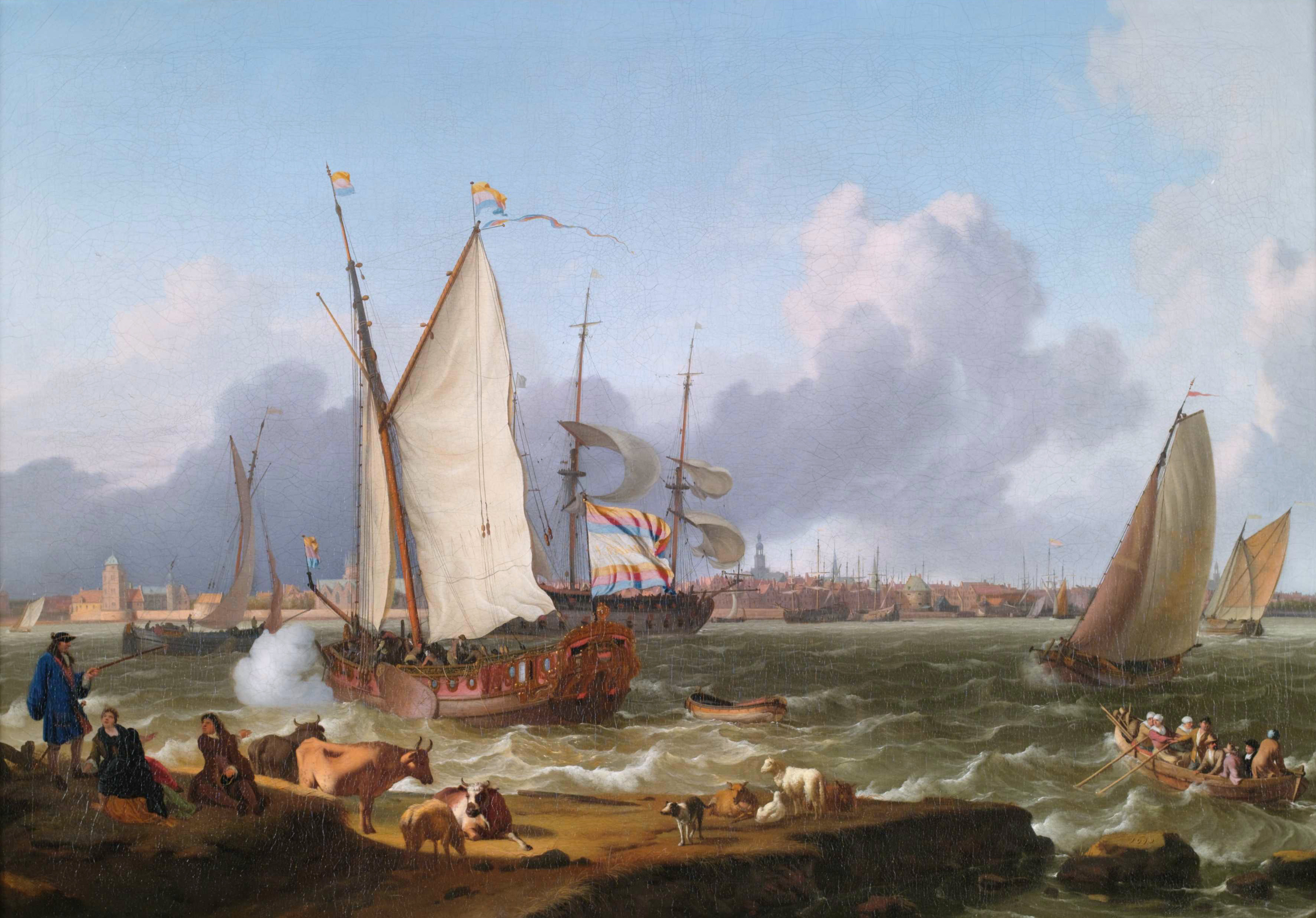
Dutch ships on the roadstead of Emden, by Ludolf Bakhuizen

On 7 November 1599, Enno III and the East Frisian estates concluded the Emden Concordat. This treaty was concluded through mediation by the Dutch States-General. The treaty was an attempt to pacify the county and restore constitutional and ecclesiastical peace. Calvinism was equated with Lutheranism; in the rest of the Holy Roman Empire this was not the case until after the Peace of Westphalia. Enno III had attempted to reconcile both directions. According to the Emden Concordat, citizens were allowed to retain their own religious beliefs. Church communities were allowed to appoint their own ministers. This limited the influence of the count on church life in East Frisia. Enno III had thus achieved the opposite of what he had attempted to achieve: religious unity.

This peace, however, would not last long. In 1600, a civil war broke out between the city of Emden and the East Frisian estates on the one hand and the count on the other. Edzard II had died in the meantime and was succeeded by his son Enno III. Enno III lost an important battle near Logum after which he hid himself between October 1602 and February 1603. In the meantime, the East Frisian estates and Emden took over sovereignty in the county and collected taxes. In February 1603, Enno III appeared in The Hague and the city of Emden sent representatives to this city as well. This led to the Agreement of The Hague of 8 April 1603. This was the beginning of Emden as a quasi-autonomous city-state. Formally it was still part of the county of East Frisia, but in reality the East Frisian counts no longer had any say in the city.

=== Supremacy of the East Frisian estates (1611–1682) ===
==== Annexation of the Harlingerland ====
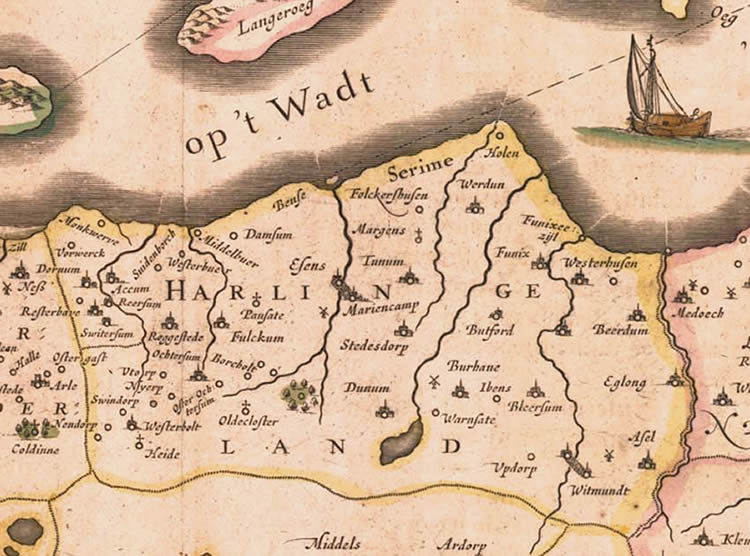
Esens, Stedesdorf and Wittmund around 1600, by Ubbo Emmius

In 1599, Count Enno III came to power in East Frisia. The count, who was known for his love of wild horses on the island of Juist, was the last descendant of his family who could speak the East Frisian language. He married Walburgis of Rietberg in 1581. Walburgis was a great-granddaughter of Balthasar Oomkens of Esens, Stedesdorf and Wittmund. Enno III moved his residence to Esens, and he became ruler of the Harlingerland independently of his father. Walburgis died in 1586 and left behind two daughters: Sabina Catharina and Agnes. A son, the newborn John Edzard, died in the same year as Walburgis. Sabina Catharina succeeded her parents as ruler of the Lordships of Esens, Stedesdorf and Wittmund. Enno III, however, wanted to bind these areas to his county once and for all. The fact that Harlingerland had remained outside the sphere of power of the counts of East Frisia for such a long time was an open wound for the dynasty. The Treaty of Berum was drawn up on 28 January 1600. For 200,000 Thalers, Sabina Catharina and Agnes sold their rights in Harlingerland to their father in favor of their half-brother Rudolf Christian. This amount was later increased to 300,000 Thalers. Rudolph II, the Holy Roman Emperor, approved the treaty on 19 September of the same year. The later lord of the Netherlands, Albert VII, as titular Duke of Guelders and thus liege lord of the Harlingerland, also approved the treaty. With this, the lordships of Esens, Stedesdorf and Wittmund were connected in personal union with the county of East Frisia. However, it remained outside the sphere of power of the East Frisian estates and it was also not part of the county itself. Two new ämter were established: Amt Esens and Amt Wittmund. The area was governed from its own chancellery.

==== Ongoing conflict with the East Frisian estates ====
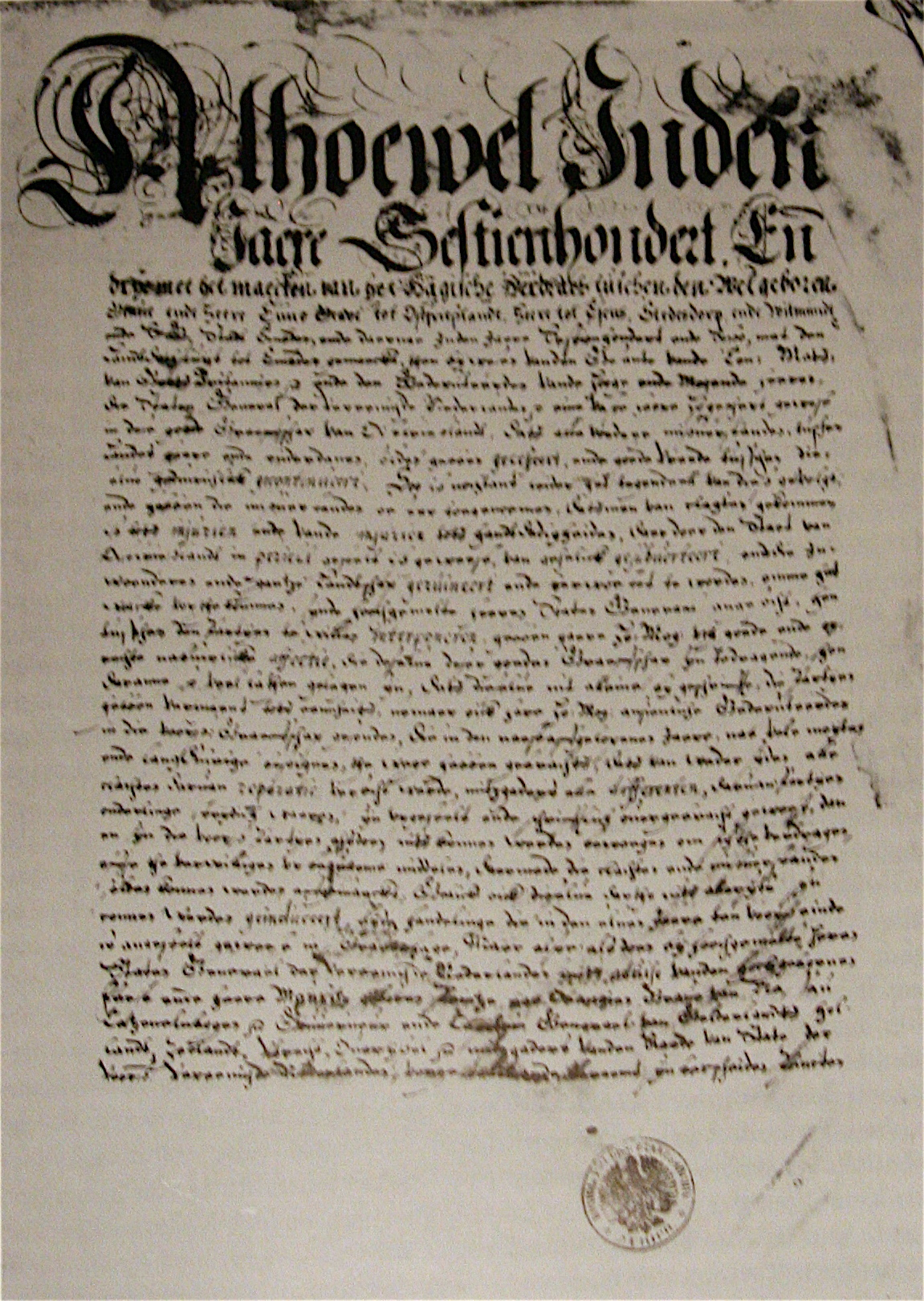
Title page of the Accord of Osterhusen

In previous decades, the East Frisian estates had already acquired far-reaching power as a result of religious and dynastic disputes. The definitive breakthrough came in the second decade of the 17th century. The struggle between Emden and the count, which had resulted in the Emden Revolution under the rule of Edzard II, flared up again under Enno III. Since 1609, the city's garrison had undertaken military action against the count. In cooperation with the East Frisian estates, places such as Greetsiel and Aurich were occupied. The States General of the Dutch Republic again tried to mediate in the conflict. On 21 May 1611, under heavy pressure from the Dutch, the Accord of Osterhusen was signed by all parties. This established the mutual relations, rights and obligations. The count's power was severely limited. Henceforth, fiscal, judicial and legislative sovereignty now rested with the East Frisian estates and the far-reaching autonomy of the city of Emden was once again recognized by the count. Emden was only formally part of the county of East Frisia. In reality it functioned as a free imperial city.Lower authorities also gained much more say in the administration of the county, which meant that the county of East Frisia was henceforth governed as an 'estatist state'. The Accord of Osterhusen is therefore also seen as the 'Magna Carta of East Frisia'.

The Accord of Osterhusen also meant an increase in Dutch influence on internal East Frisian affairs. Part of the treaty was the legitimization of a Dutch garrison in the fortress of Leerort. It was agreed that Dutch troops would be allowed to use the military part of the fortress for five years. Leerort was located at the mouth of the Leda in the Ems and was therefore a strategic fortress. The Count of East Frisia remained in possession of the castle building. The Dutch repaired the dilapidated facilities of the fortress and would eventually occupy the fortress until 1744, despite repeated requests from the Count of East Frisia to leave the fortress. The counts therefore moved the residence of the Amt Leerort to the nearby town of Leer. Like his father, Enno III realized all too well that his county had become a de facto vassal state of the Dutch Republic through the Accord of Osterhusen and the Dutch garrisons in Emden and Leerort. A new attempt in 1615 by Enno III to join the Dutch confederation was, however, blocked by the East Frisian estates. Whether the Dutch States-General in The Hague would have agreed to this is doubtful.

==== Hardships of the Thirty Years' War ====
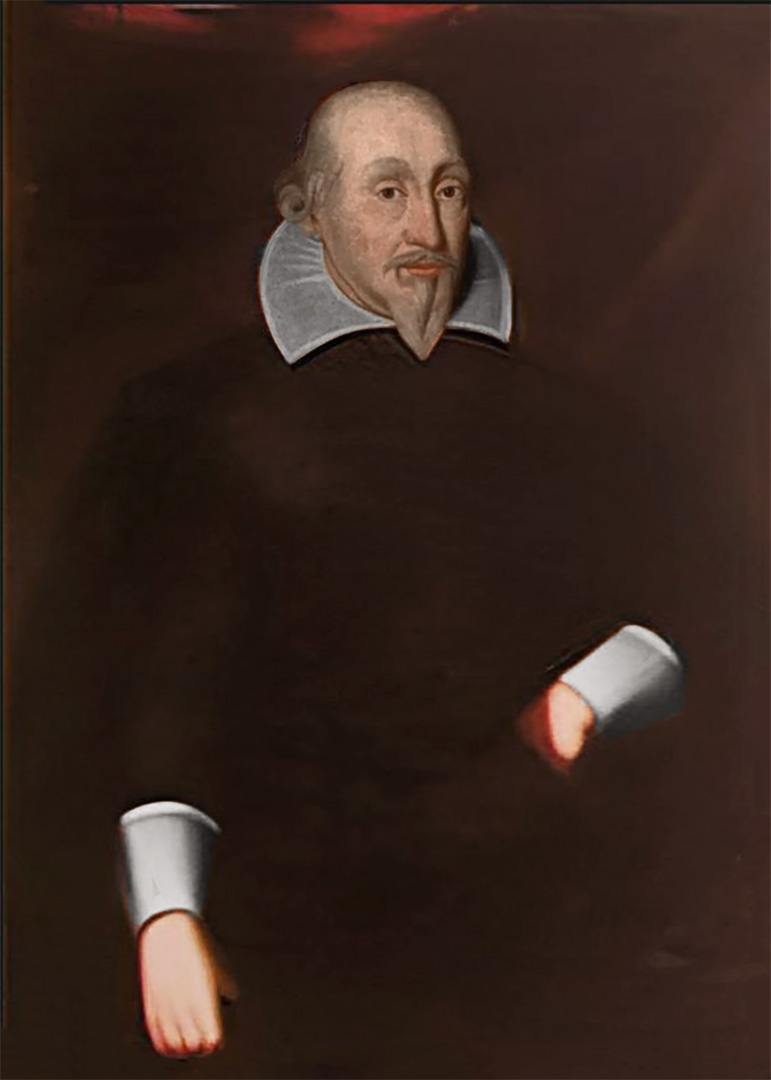
Enno III, Count of East Frisia (1599–1625)

Count Enno III stayed out of the Thirty Years' War. This disastrous war lasted from 1618 to 1648 and caused millions of deaths through war violence, famines and disease epidemics throughout the Holy Roman Empire. Initially, East Frisia was spared these hardships. The Thirty Years' War was a struggle between Catholic and Protestant rulers. The religious situation in East Frisia was extremely complex at the beginning of the 17th century. In the southwest of the county, Calvinism under the leadership of the city of Emden was the dominant force. In the northeast, the inhabitants, like the counts of East Frisia, were Lutheran. The power of the counts over church life in East Frisia was severely limited by the Emden Concordat of 1599.

In November 1622, the Protestant military leader Ernst von Mansfeld, in the service of the Dutch Republic, was looking for an area where he and his troops could spend the winter. Under the pretext that the Netherlands had to protect the rights and freedom of the city of Emden and the East Frisian estates, Mansfeld's army was led to East Frisia. This suited the Dutch Republic well: East Frisia was protected from Spanish attacks as a neutral state and Mansfeld could, if necessary, quickly advance from East Frisia to the Dutch Republic if the fight against the Spanish required it. Moreover, the Dutch did not have to support Mansfeld's army. The occupation of East Frisia by Mansfeld's troops was as swift as it was ruthless. Without Enno III being able to offer effective resistance, his county was occupied. The castles of Stickhausen, Greetsiel and Friedeburg were taken and everywhere the rule of the count was exchanged for a de facto military occupation by Ernst von Mansfeld. The powerless Enno III left his residence in Aurich and withdrew to his castle in Esens. Mansfeld's troops pursued and arrested him. In addition, they stole the 300,000 Thalers that Enno III had prepared for his daughter Agnes and her husband Gundaker of Liechtenstein as compensation for the acquisition of the Harlingerland as part of the Treaty of Berum. The rural population of East Frisia also suffered greatly. Only the city of Emden, protected by its strong fortifications, was spared occupation.

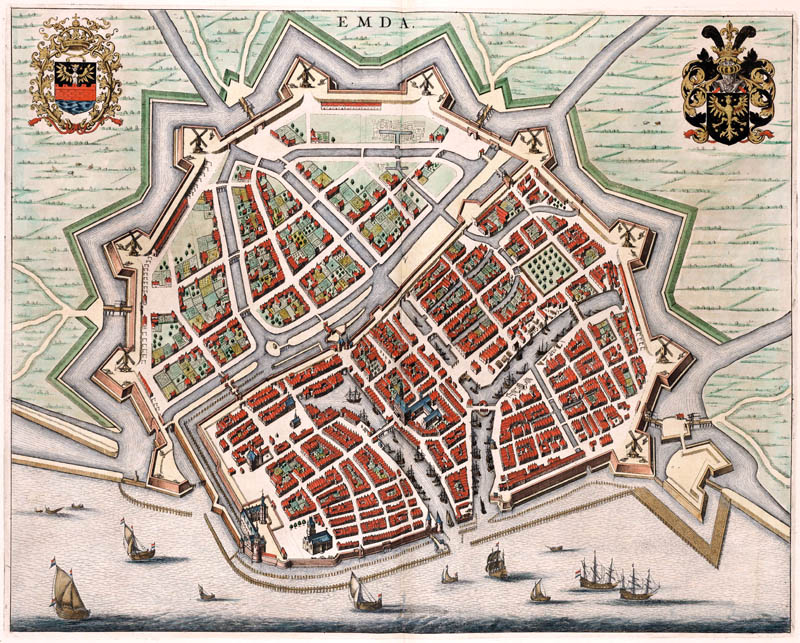
Emden in 1649, by Joan Blaeu

Ernst von Mansfeld was not only interested in a wintering area for his army. During his stay in Greetsiel he tried to acquire a prominent position among the high nobility of East Frisia. In vain he asked for the hand of Enno III's daughter Christina Sophia. This was refused. Mansfeld was also out to be recognized as the legitimate ruler of East Frisia. According to him, the northern districts of the Prince-Bishopric of Münster, Cloppenburg, Meppen, Vechta and Wildeshausen, would also belong to this county. The role of the Cirksena dynasty would be greatly reduced and the area would be converted into an impregnable fortress in the northwest of the Holy Roman Empire. The East Frisian estates refused to cooperate with these plans and they tried to free East Frisia from the occupation by addressing the Dutch States-General about their role in this conflict. However, they reacted negatively and Mansfeld would remain in East Frisia until 1623.

The leader of the imperial troops, Johann Tserclaes of Tilly, advanced towards East Frisia to thwart Mansfeld's plans. However, due to the isolated location of the area, he decided against a direct confrontation. The occupation, which would eventually last seventeen months, would cause famine and epidemics. In the summer of 1623, the plague spread through East Frisia and claimed many victims. Even the city of Emden began to turn against Mansfeld's occupation. They had taken in many refugees from the surrounding areas and the economic decline of East Frisia also had a negative impact on the city. Mansfeld's troops responded to these open hostilities with plundering and violence against the local population. The East Frisian citizens in turn responded with revenge actions. In the vicinity of military camps of Mansfeld's troops, up to 90% of the population had fled the plundering and violence. Empty houses were then set on fire by his troops, leaving many places as wasteland. Gradually, a situation arose that was not much different from a war. The Dutch States-General saw that the situation was no longer tenable and mediated between Mansfeld and the East Frisian estates. Mansfeld demanded compensation, 300,000 Guilder, for his withdrawal from East Frisia. This large amount was beyond the means of the East Frisians, so they had to borrow the amount from the Dutch States-General. On January 12, 1624, Mansfeld signed the withdrawal treaty and subsequently left a ruined East Frisia. After Mansfeld's withdrawal, Emden refused to contribute to the repayment of this sum.

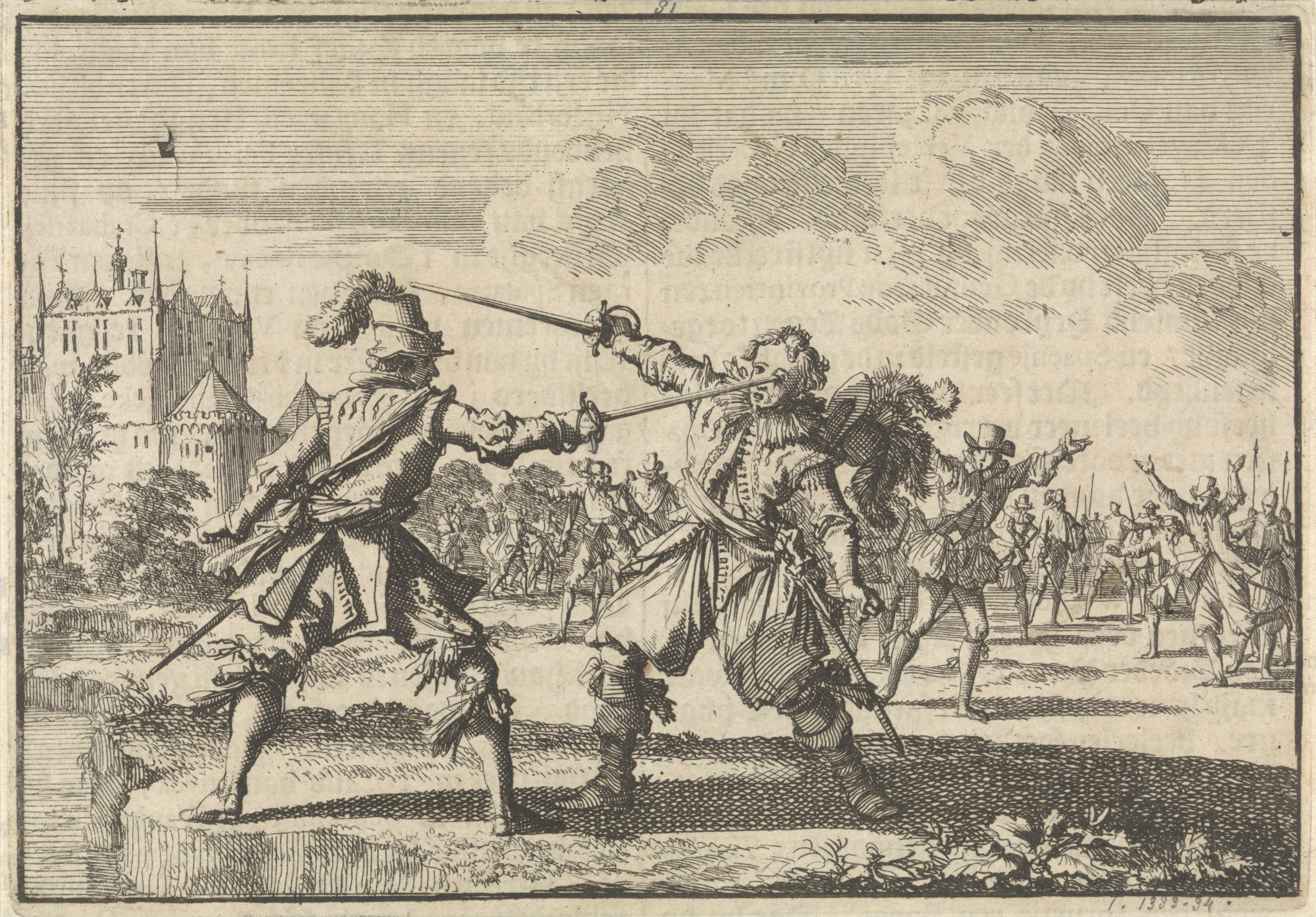
Rudolf Christian, Count of East Frisia (1625–1628) is fatally wounded in a duel, by Jan Luyken

In 1625 Enno III died. He was succeeded by his son Rudolf Christian. He introduced the definitive coat of arms of the county of East Frisia with the symbolism of the lordships of Esens, Stedesdorf and Wittmund that had been acquired by his father. Two years later, in 1627, East Frisia was again ravaged by the consequences of the Thirty Years' War. Tilly's troops entered the county in search of a winter quarter. Once again, the borders of East Frisia could not be defended due to internal divisions and the city of Emden flatly refused to help in the defense. Count Rudolf Christian also refused to use his private income for the country's defense. The castle of Berum was taken as a headquarter. Troops were also stationed in Jever, the Rheiderland and Friedeburg. Only Emden and Aurich were spared military occupation. As with the earlier occupation by Mansfeld, the citizens of the county of East Frisia were expected to support the troops financially. However, Emden again refused all cooperation and responsibility. In April 1628, Count Rudolf Christian tried to achieve a reduction of this contribution with negotiations in Berum. During the festivities, a duel broke out between Rudolf Christian and Lieutenant Thomas Streif of the Imperial forces, in which Rudolf Christian was mortally wounded. His brother, Ulrich II, succeeded him as Count of East Frisia. Unlike Mansfeld's troops, the Imperial forces were generally disciplined. The Count was allowed to retain his residence in Aurich, and the troops paid for their supplies. The money that the troops cost thus flowed back into the East Frisian economy. After setbacks for the Catholic side of the conflict, Tilly's troops were forced to leave East Frisia again.

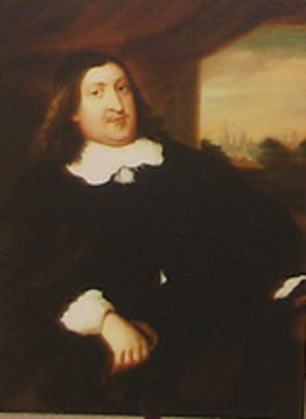
Ulrich II, Count of East Frisia (1628–1648)

In 1637, Landgrave William V of Hesse-Kassel invaded East Frisia. The Protestant side of the Thirty Years' War had suffered some heavy losses, which led to imperial troops threatening the Landgraviate of Hesse-Kassel. William V managed to escape with his family and the greater part of his army. Once again, the Dutch Republic offered East Frisia as a refreshment station for the troops of the Protestant Union. As soon as Count Ulrich II heard of this, he began to organize the defense of his county. However, the resistance was soon broken and East Frisia was once again presented with a fait accompli. Initially, 2,500 troops were quartered in East Frisia and the county was to pay a monthly contribution of 12,000 Reichsthaler. Shortly after, William V died. His widow, Amalie Elisabeth, took over command of the troops and decided to stay in East Frisia much longer than the agreed six months. East Frisia was also to pay 15,000 Reichsthaler. The Count of East Frisia, the East Frisian estates, and eventually even the Dutch States-General tried to persuade the Hessian troops to leave East Frisia. Amalie Elisabeth refused, defending her presence on the pretext that East Frisia was too weak on its own and therefore had to be defended. Although the Hessian troops generally behaved in a disciplined manner, resistance to this renewed occupation began to grow. Ulrich II recruited 2,000 troops to prove that East Frisia could protect itself against imperial troops. Hessian troops felt threatened and began to entrench themselves in the Rheiderland. Skirmishes broke out on both sides and the local population was again confronted with war violence and plundering. Only the death of the Hessian commander-in-chief, Kaspar von Eberstein, prevented a direct attack on the capital Aurich. The Dutch Republic negotiated a compromise in which both sides were allowed to maintain a force. The Hessian troops remained in East Frisia for the time being. Emden and parts of the knighthood of the East Frisian estates protested against the force that Count Ulrich II had at his disposal. The count was therefore forced to halve his army to 1,000 men. In return, the Hessian troops would leave East Frisia. However, this did not happen. Several attempts to drive the Hessians out of East Frisia failed. In 1647, imperial troops led by Lamboy advanced into East Frisia. The county threatened to become a battlefield. They wanted to drive out the Hessians and make East Frisia a Spanish base between the Dutch Republic and the Kingdom of Denmark. The Swedish army leader Hans Christoff von Königsmarck and Hessian general Carl von Rabenhaupt then moved into East Frisia to thwart these plans. The imperial troops withdrew, after which the Hessian troops remained in East Frisia long after the Peace of Westphalia. The troops did not leave until August 1650.

All in all, the Thirty Years' War, although East Frisia had not been directly involved in the war, had caused great destruction and economic decline. The East Frisian estates, the city of Emden and the counts of East Frisia were unable to end their internal strife and unitedly protect the county from further hardship. For years, East Frisia was forced to support foreign troops. This meant a great financial burden that the county could not bear. Large sums of money were borrowed from the Dutch States-General, who ironically had also been responsible for the military occupations by troops of the Protestant Union. The theft of 300,000 Reichsthalers that had been intended for Agnes and her husband Gundaker, the Prince of Liechtenstein, by Ernst von Mansfeld also caused financial problems. East Frisia could not raise this amount again. However, the House of Liechtenstein made numerous attempts to collect the amount nevertheless. In 1663, the Prince-Bishop of Münster, as a creditor of the Prince of Liechtenstein, invaded the County of East Frisia. The States-General of the Dutch Republic and Duke Eberhard III of Württemberg intervened and drove the Münster troops out of East Frisia. A compromise was reached and East Frisia was ordered to increase the amount they owed the Prince of Liechtenstein by another 200,000 Thalers.

==== Weak leadership and princely status ====
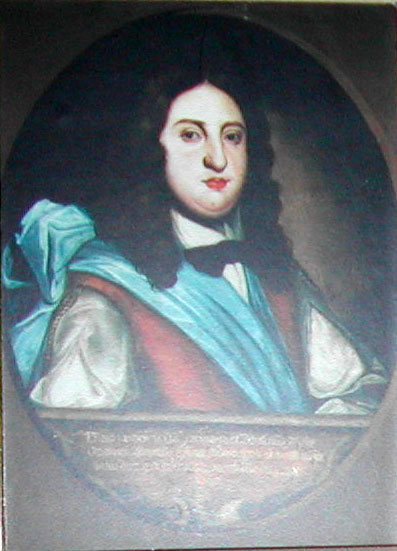
Enno Louis, Prince of East Frisia (1651–1660)

Count Ulrich II died in 1648 and was succeeded by his wife Juliana of Hesse-Darmstadt. Like her husband, she led an extravagant lifestyle. She also made many enemies, which is why her eldest son, Enno Louis, was recalled from abroad in 1651 to take over the government of his mother's county. Enno Louis grew up during the hardships of the Thirty Years' War. To escape this, he was sent to the relatively safe Netherlands. In 1641 he became engaged to Henriette Catharina of Nassau, daughter of Prince Frederick Henry of Orange. This was another attempt to have East Frisia join the Dutch confederation. However, this failed again. Much money was invested in Enno Louis' education. In general, however, he did not seize the opportunities he was given, which caused his development to stagnate. He proved unable to solve the problems of his county and his engagement to Henriette Catharina was broken off. He was, however, completely indifferent to this. The only success he achieved was on a personal level. The Holy Roman Emperor wanted to reward military leaders who had achieved success during the Thirty Years' War with the title of Imperial prince. These were mainly Catholics. In order to maintain the religious balance, Protestant leaders were also elevated. Hermann Conring, an important East Frisian scholar, took charge and had Enno Louis elevated to the status of Prince in 1654. At first, this was only for himself. In 1662, his brother, George Christian managed to have the title of Prince apply to the entire Cirksena dynasty and its descendants.

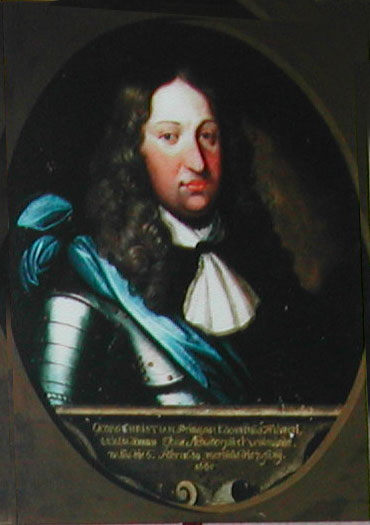
George Christian, Prince of East Frisia (1660–1665)

Enno Louis died in 1660. Because he had only daughters he was succeeded by his brother George Christian. George Christian had been educated at the academies of Breda and Tübingen. However, this was not a success and he was soon recalled to East Frisia. George Christian was happy with the status of Prince of the Holy Roman Empire, but he evaded any responsibility he had as ruler of the County of East Frisia. This brought him into conflict with his younger brother Edzard Ferdinand. He refused to give his younger brother a part of his father's inheritance. The chancellor of East Frisia, Hermann Höpfner, tried to guide the government of the county somewhat in the right direction, but this had only limited success. George Christian also attempted to avoid or ignore the debts East Frisia owed to foreign powers. George Christian's younger brother Edzard Ferdinand tried to lead the government of East Frisia in the right direction. Of the three sons of Ulrich II, Edzard Ferdinand clearly had the most talent. However, George Christian categorically refused to give him a position in the government. This conflict even escalated to such an extent that part of the East Frisian estates and the city of Emden planned to recognize Edzard Ferdinand as the rightful prince of East Frisia. Edzard Ferdinand did not like this, however, and he tried to reconcile with his older brother. This led to a treaty on January 19, 1661, in which Edzard Ferdinand relinquished a position in the government in exchange for an annual allowance. He withdrew to the city of Norden, which he obtained as an appanage: he was henceforth known as the 'Count of Norden'. When George Christian died unexpectedly in 1665, Edzard Ferdinand led an interim government on behalf of his brother's minor children. During his regency, he strove for reconciliation with the East Frisian estates. In October 1665 his nephew Christian Everhard was born, months after the death of his father George Christian. However, George Christian's widow, Christine Charlotte of Württemberg, seized power to realize her ambitious plans. She adopted an uncompromising attitude towards the East Frisian estates, which caused internal tensions to rise again. A plan by the East Frisian estates to have Edzard Ferdinand seize power again at the expense of Christine Charlotte failed, however, due to the death of Edzard Ferdinand in 1668.

==== Absolutist tendencies and internal friction ====
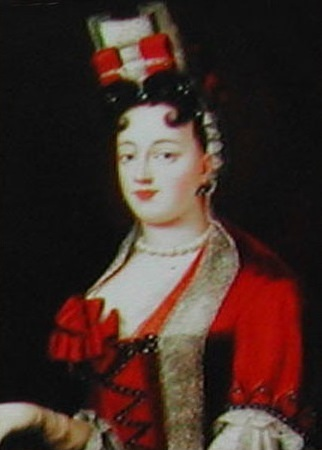
Christine Charlotte, Regent of East Frisia (1665–1690)

After the death of her brother-in-law, the widow Christine Charlotte was able to assume sole rule of East Frisia. She had no intention of setting herself up as merely the guardian of her children until her eldest son Christian Everhard could take over. On the contrary, Christine Charlotte was determined to transform East Frisia into an absolutist state. Her goal was to establish a strong central government in East Frisia. The county had been in need of administrative renewal and modernization of the princely government for decades. However, she was severely hampered in this endeavor by the powerful East Frisian estates. Christine Charlotte was bound by the East Frisian constitution, which stated that the East Frisian estates had sovereignty in the areas of taxes and the army. Christine Charlotte was supported by powerful allies such as the dukes George William and Ernest August, scions of the House of Welf.

The East Frisian estates felt seriously threatened by this and raised their own army. East Frisia came to the brink of a civil war several times as a result. Several foreign armies also used the area as a refreshment station, causing East Frisia to once again fall victim to plundering and destruction. The Dutch States-General finally forced Christine Charlotte to give in. In 1677 she suffered her final defeat when the Emperor of the Holy Roman Empire, at the request of the East Frisian estates, confirmed the East Frisian constitution on all points and thus explicitly recognized the power of the estates. Christine Charlotte did not accept this and she continued to reform the princely government. Officials and ministers from outside East Frisia were given a place in the county's administration. They were well trained and well paid so that their loyalty was guaranteed. Christine Charlotte also asserted her authority in a religious sense by supporting the Lutheran communities of Emden and Leer; two Calvinist strongholds. The East Frisian estates watched all this with dismay and by the mid-1680s tensions had risen to such an extent that the estates refused any cooperation with Christine Charlotte. On 22 September 1682, the East Frisian estates and the city of Emden concluded a secret agreement with Frederick William of Brandenburg. Brandenburg occupied Greetsiel and Emden was placed under the protection of Brandenburg troops. Christine Charlotte's fierce protests were in vain. These developments set in motion a process that would eventually lead to the takeover of East Frisia by the Kingdom of Prussia in 1744. In 1684 Christine Charlotte was expelled from East Frisia. In 1689 she returned and in 1690 she transferred the rule in East Frisia to her son Christian Everhard.

=== Downfall of the Cirksena dynasty (1682–1744) ===
==== Brandenburg-Prussia's claims to East Frisia ====
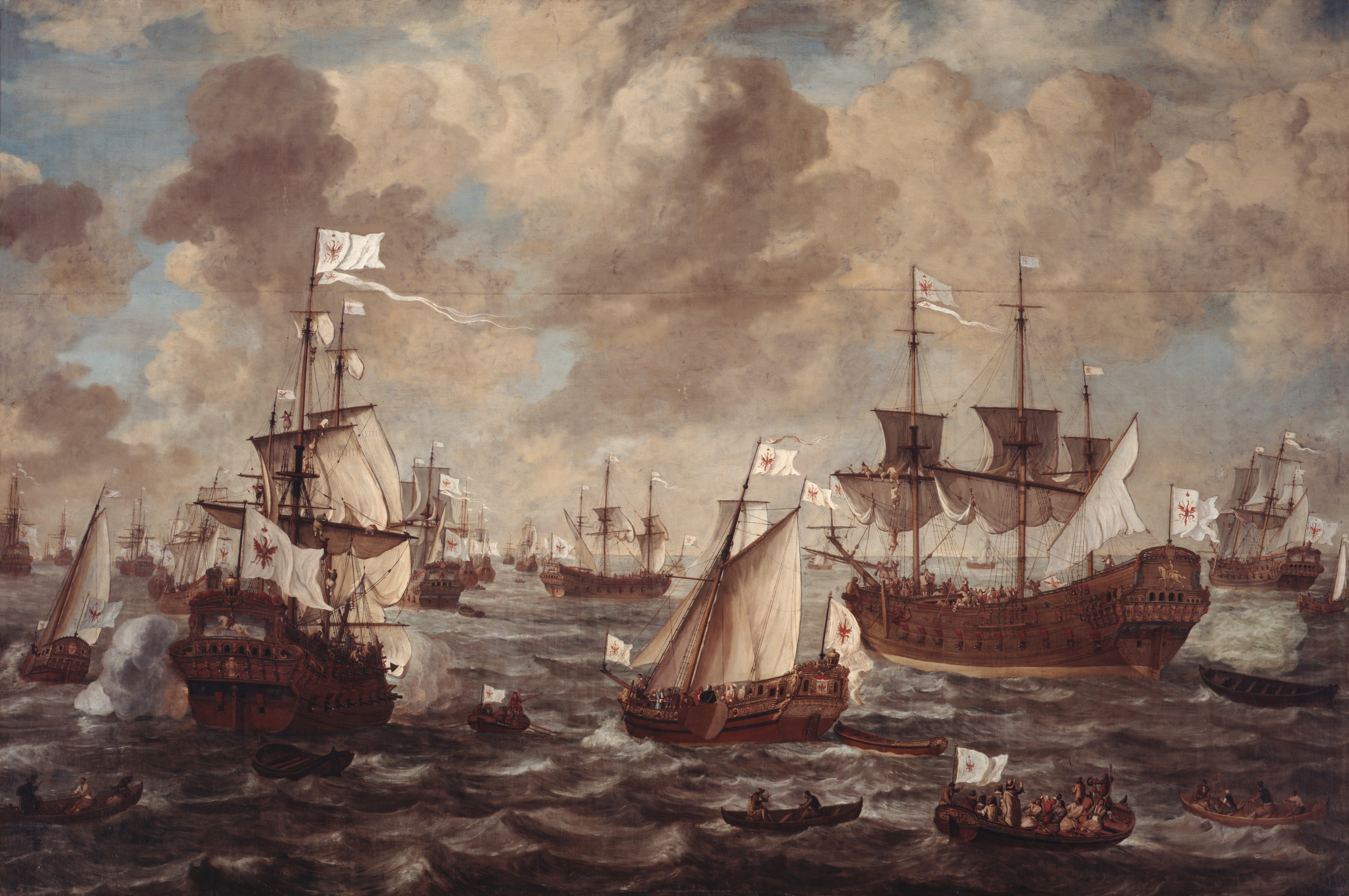
1684 painting of the Brandenburg Navy

Christian Everhard was born four months after his father's death. After his mother Christine Charlotte had come into serious conflict with the East Frisian estates, Christian Everhard took over the government of the county in 1690. Before taking power, he had spent a lot of time abroad and visited many foreign monarchs, like Louis XIV of France. Christian Everhard had been deeply impressed by Pietism, a religious movement of Lutheranism. He did his best to spread this movement among his subjects in East Frisia. As a result, the population was confronted with many new religious rules. After taking power in the county, he concluded agreements with the East Frisian estates in 1693 and 1698. In 1699 he visited Emden and was warmly received. In order to counter the influence of the Elector of Brandenburg, he entered into an inheritance treaty with Duke Ernest Augustus of Brunswick-Lüneburg. If Ernest Augustus died childless, the Cirksena dynasty would inherit the counties of Hoya and Diepholz. On the other hand, the scion of the House of Welf would inherit the County of East Frisia upon the extinction of the Cirksena dynasty. However, this inheritance treaty was not recognized by the Holy Roman Emperor. In fact, the Emperor recognized the claims of Elector Frederick III of Brandenburg on East Frisia on 10 December 1694. Meanwhile, the city of Emden was placed under firm Brandenburg control. Brandenburg-Prussia wanted to become a trading and economic power following the example of the Dutch Republic. To do so, it needed a port on the North Sea. On 22 April 1683, the Electorate therefore concluded a treaty with Emden. The Brandenburg African Company was moved to Emden. However, this enterprise was not a great success and it was dissolved in 1711. The Brandenburg Navy was also moved to Emden after having been established in Greetsiel. All in all, Brandenburg's influence in East Frisia continued to grow.

==== Brief revival of princely authority ====
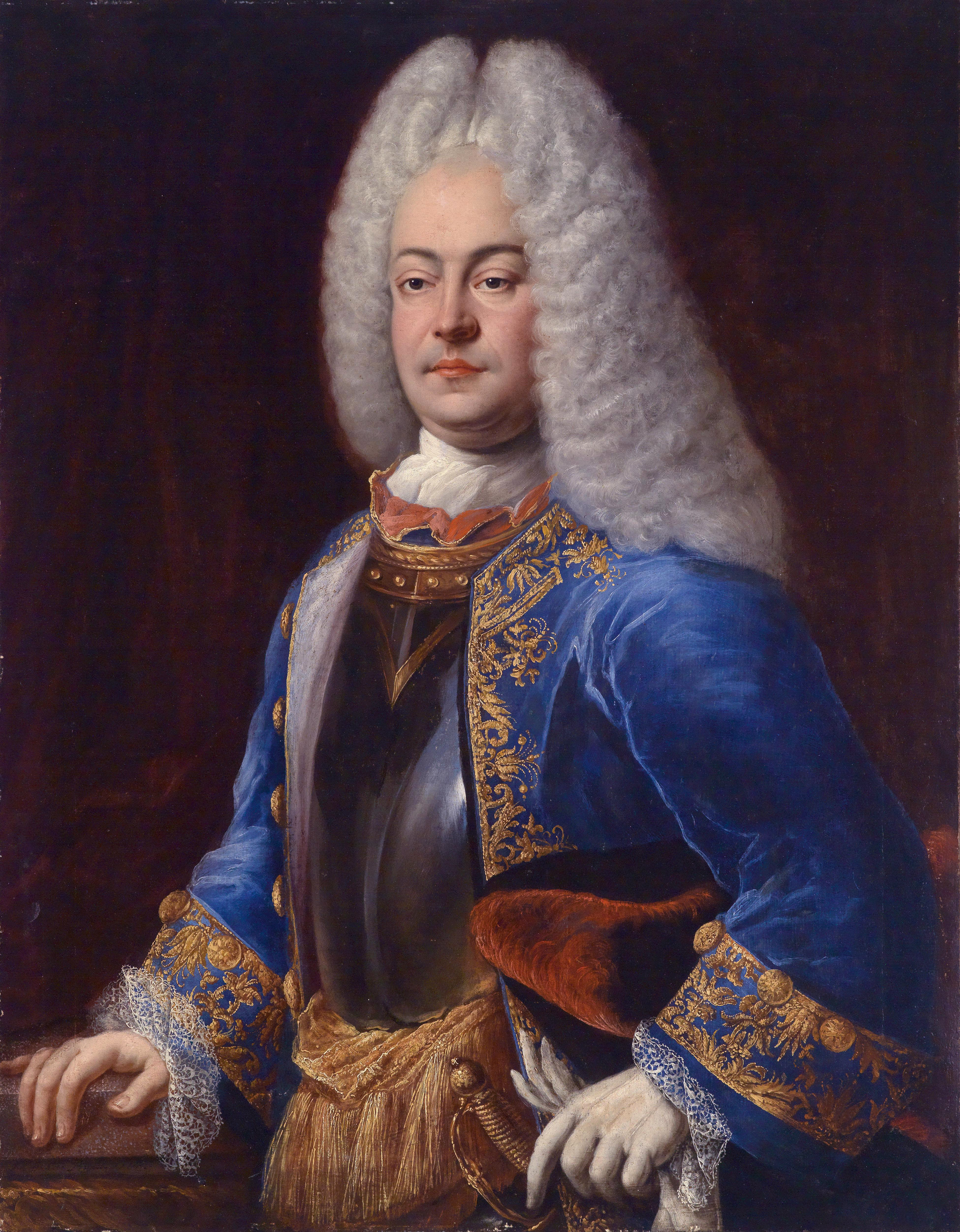
George Albert, Prince of East Frisia (1708-1734)

In 1708, George Albert came to power as Prince of East Frisia. His father had managed to bring about peace with the East Frisian estates. However, this peace had a shaky foundation and rested only on the Prince's passivity. What also helped to calm the tensions was the growth of the East Frisian agricultural economy. The growing prosperity reduced the tensions that had plagued the county for a long time. George Albert was sent to the Rudolph-Antoniana in Wolfenbüttel. Here he learned about all aspects of ruling a county. He also came into contact with many (future) foreign princes. Afterwards, his father sent him to the University of Leiden. His father also gave a detailed plan of what his son's education should include. During his time in Leiden he was deeply impressed by Duke John Churchill of Marlborough, commander of the Dutch, Spanish and Imperial troops during the War of the Spanish Succession. For some time George Albert served as a volunteer under John Churchill in this war. In the meantime his father had become increasingly ill and the possibility that he would soon have to take over his father's rule was seriously considered. In 1708 this fear became reality and so George Albert became Prince of East Frisia at the age of 18. George Albert continued the conciliatory attitude that his father had shown towards the East Frisian estates. This ensured a peaceful rule until 1718. George Albert was very interested in dike construction and he was actively involved in the government of his county. However, he was increasingly plagued by illness. This placed increasing responsibility for the administration of the county in the hands of the East Frisian chancellor Enno Rudolph Brenneysen. The chancellor aimed to strengthen the Prince's authority in East Frisia and thus came into conflict with the East Frisian estates. East Frisia was also confronted with the disastrous consequences of the Christmas Flood of 1717. Following this flood, both the East Frisian estates and the Prince attempted to collect taxes to overcome the consequences of this natural disaster.

==== Civil war and the final end of Cirksena rule ====
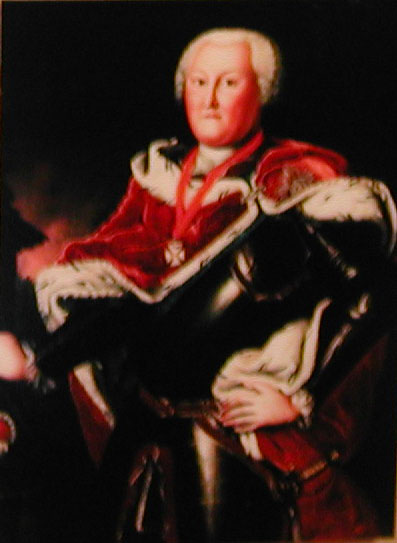
Charles Edzard, Prince of East Frisia (1734–1744)

The attempts of Enno Rudolph Brenneysen to strengthen the Prince's authority in East Frisia resulted in far-reaching hostilities. In 1724, the city of Emden prepared itself for the battle against the Princely authority. In February 1726, a battle took place between troops of the Prince and troops of the city of Emden; the Appeal War was a fact. The princely troops were victorious. In April 1726, unrest broke out in Leer, after which Prince George Albert sent troops to put an end to this uprising as well. This was also successful, but it also cost many lives. The Emperor of the Holy Roman Empire condemned the rebels and urged them to surrender and obey George Albert. The Lordship of Oldersum, in the possession of the city of Emden, was occupied by imperial troops and George Albert was victorious. Even the city of Emden surrendered to him. However, it soon became clear that George Albert had achieved a Pyrrhic victory. In the peace negotiations, chancellor Enno Rudolph Brenneysen was unable to capitalize on the victory. The Holy Roman Emperor, Charles VI, granted the rebels a pardon. On 11 June 1734 George Albert died. He was succeeded by his son: Charles Edzard.

The last Prince of East Frisia from the House of Cirksena was Charles Edzard. The beginning of his life can be called tragic. He lost many brothers and sisters at a young age and before he was seven years old he lost his mother as well. His father George Albert realized that the survival of his dynasty was at stake. Charles Edzard was therefore brought up very strictly and he was deprived of all freedom so that every possibility for self-development was prevented. There was no possibility to experience a Grand Tour or to enjoy a proper education abroad. Because his father was very ill, Charles Edzard was quickly prepared for his rule over East Frisia. He was married off to Sophie Wilhelmine, daughter of Margrave George Frederick Charles of Brandenburg-Bayreuth. Three weeks after the marriage his father died, which brought him to power in East Frisia. However, he was hardly prepared for this heavy responsibility. The authority of the Cirksena dynasty had in the meantime weakened to such an extent that large parts of the East Frisian estates and the city of Emden flatly refused to recognize him as Prince of East Frisia. It is therefore questionable whether Charles Edzard even played a role in the government of his county. Brandenburg-Prussia therefore saw its chance to definitively incorporate East Frisia into its realm. Plans were gradually made and rolled out to accelerate the takeover by King Frederick II of Prussia. On 14 March 1744, the Emden Convention was signed. This treaty regulated the takeover of East Frisia after the extinction of the Cirksena dynasty. Emden wanted to regain its position of power from the late 16th and early 17th centuries. The city was convinced that this could be achieved under Prussian rule. From the Prussian side, preparations for the takeover had been underway since 1730. The East Frisian Sebastian Anton Homfeld played an important role in this. For his role in the seizure of power, he was later appointed Chancellor of East Frisia. Charles Edzward was no match for these powers. He died unexpectedly on 25 May 1744 without leaving a male heir. This meant that nothing stood in the way of the Prussians definitively taking over East Frisia.

Several other rulers tried to prevent the takeover of East Frisia by Prussia. Johann Ludwig of Wied-Runkel argued that he, through his wife Christine Luise of East Frisia, was the rightful heir to the county. Christine Luise was the daughter of Frederick Ulrich of East Frisia and Marie Charlotte of East Frisia, the daughter of Prince Christian Everhard of East Frisia. The county of East Frisia should therefore have been inherited through the female line in his view. Prince Wenzel Anton of Kaunitz-Rietberg, who also was State Chancellor of the Habsburg monarchy, also claimed his right of inheritance as the son of Marie Ernestine Francisca of Rietberg, the last Cirksena ruler of the County of Rietberg. Finally, the House of Hanover also laid claim to East Frisia on the basis of the inheritance treaty that Christian Everhard had concluded with the Guelph Duke Ernest Augustus of Brunswick-Lüneburg.

== Law and judiciary ==
=== The origin of law and judiciary in East Frisia ===
==== Law and judiciary at the time of Frisian freedom ====
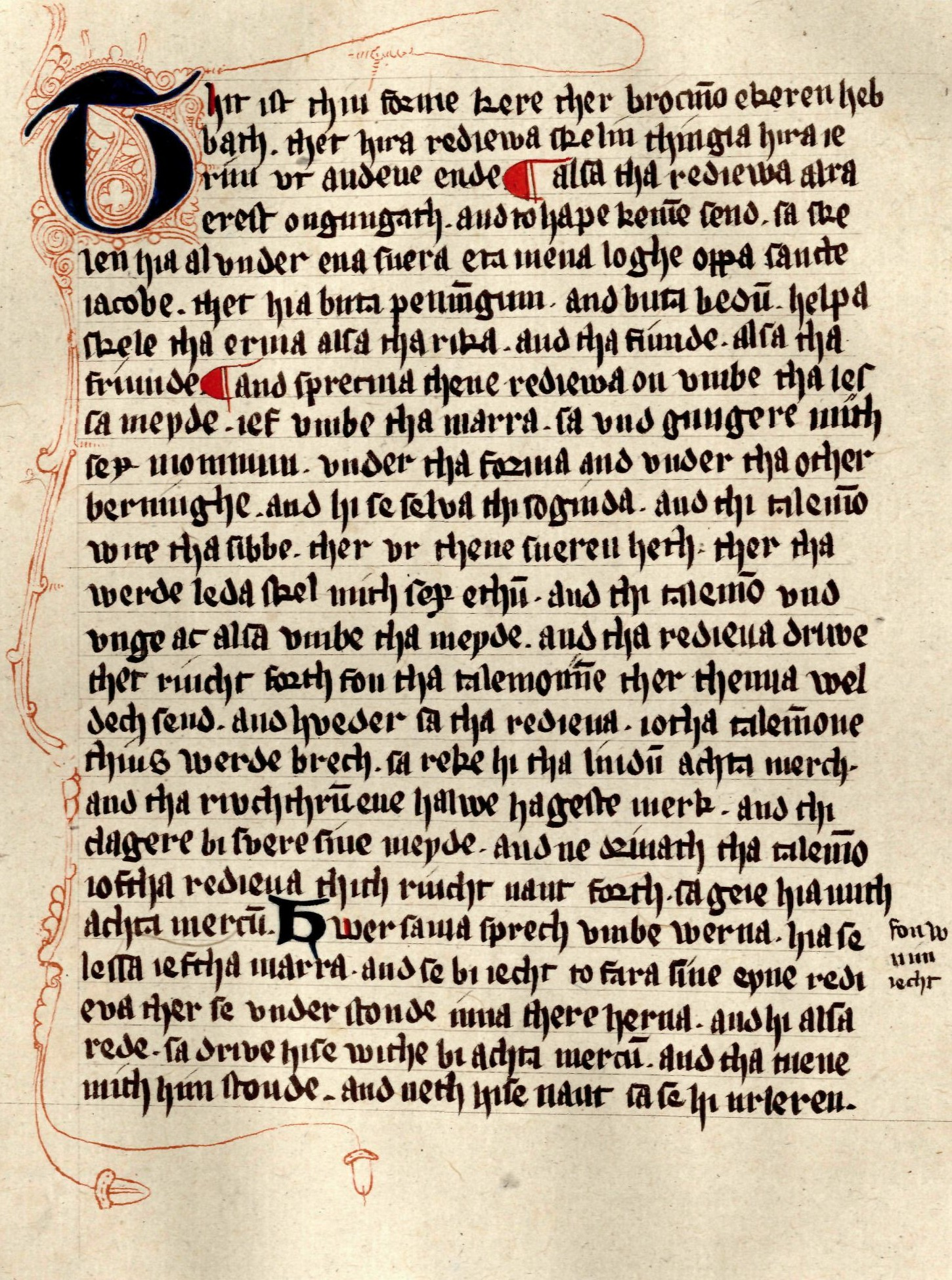
First page of a manuscript of the Law of Brokmerland

After the incorporation of (East) Frisia into the Frankish realm, local laws, rules and traditions were maintained. In the early Middle Ages, a structure with counts as local representatives of the authority also emerged in Frisia. These counts functioned as the highest judge in a gau. He also appointed other judicial authorities. In addition, the free landowners elected a so-called 'Asega' from among themselves. The task of the Asega was to uphold the law and he could give a verdict in a legal case if requested to do so. After the collapse of the central authority in the Holy Roman Empire, local rulers emerged everywhere and founded dynasties. As a result, power shifted to the many counties, duchies and prince-bishoprics that the Empire was rich in. However, a dynasty could not establish itself in Frisia between the Vlie and the Weser, and outside rulers could never permanently establish their authority in the Frisian areas. This was the starting point of the system of 'Frisian freedom'. The role of the 'Asega' was maintained, although it now bore a different name: 'Riuchter' or 'Consul'. Holding this position was still linked to land ownership. The jurisdiction of this consul was always a village or parish. Each medieval district of Frisia, the so-called 'Sealands' had about 12 to 16 of these consuls. They met annually at the Upstalsboom to discuss all kinds of matters relating to legislation and jurisprudence.

==== Jurisdiction of the chieftains ====
From the fourteenth century onwards, prominent individuals came to the forefront of the rule in East Frisia. Based on acquired wealth, large land holdings or the position of 'consul', they acquired an increasing share of power. The period of 'Frisian freedom' was therefore exchanged for a system of chieftains: local rulers who held power in their village or area. The chieftains saw themselves as successors to the earlier consuls; in 1438, the chieftains of the Norderland and the Harlingerland explicitly called themselves 'Chieftain and Consul'. Some chieftains, such as Focko Ukena, tried to introduce their own laws and regulations in the East Frisian lands. However, resistance to his takeover prevented this. In this period, all kinds of old Frisian legal sources were also recorded. In addition to legal rules, these legal records also contained provisions for constitutional or administrative rules and traditions.

The elected consuls controlled the lower jurisdiction in their villages and parishes and together with consuls from nearby villages they represented their district. This collection of consuls functioned as the highest court of justice in the area concerned. As time went by, the chieftains increasingly took on more power. They gained more and more influence in the jurisprudence of the area where they held power and often functioned as supreme judge within their domain. Only in Emsigerland, with the powerful city of Emden, did the legal system remain more or less unchanged: here, a collection of elected judges continued to function as the highest court. Nevertheless, in Emsigerland too, the chieftains often held the lower jurisdiction in the villages.

=== Judiciary of the County of East Frisia ===
==== Rule of the Cirksena dynasty ====
When the county of East Frisia was founded in 1464, the counts of the Cirksena dynasty also tried to assert their power in the area of law and jurisdiction. The first counts of this dynasty introduced laws and regulations that were based on the local rules and customs of the time. However, one problem was that these could differ considerably from each other from district to district. Count Ulrich I set up all kinds of committees to create clarity and thus arrive at a single jurisdiction in the entire county. This created more distance from the old Frisian legal traditions and the jurisdiction in East Frisia began to show more and more similarities with other areas in the northwest of the Holy Roman Empire. This process was continued by Edzard I. In 1518, he drew up the East Frisian law. This was subsequently the applicable state law of East Frisia for almost 300 years. Nevertheless, the influence of old Frisian legal traditions remained. The lower jurisdiction in East Frisia was now in the hands of the Amtmann of the many different ämter that East Frisia now consisted of. Appeals could be lodged with the 'landrichter'. This court had no fixed abode and travelled through the county. Appeals could also be lodged against the landrichter; this had to be done with the count and his advisers themselves. Initially there was only one landrichter. During the time of the fraternal strife between Edzard II and Johan II there were two landrichters and in 1600 a third was added for the Harlingerland. However, the power of the landrichter was increasingly restricted. As the institutions of East Frisia developed, more and more learned clerks came to work at the courts of East Frisia. They were mainly trained in Medieval Roman law, which also meant that Frisian legal rules became less and less important.

==== Privilegium de non appellando ====
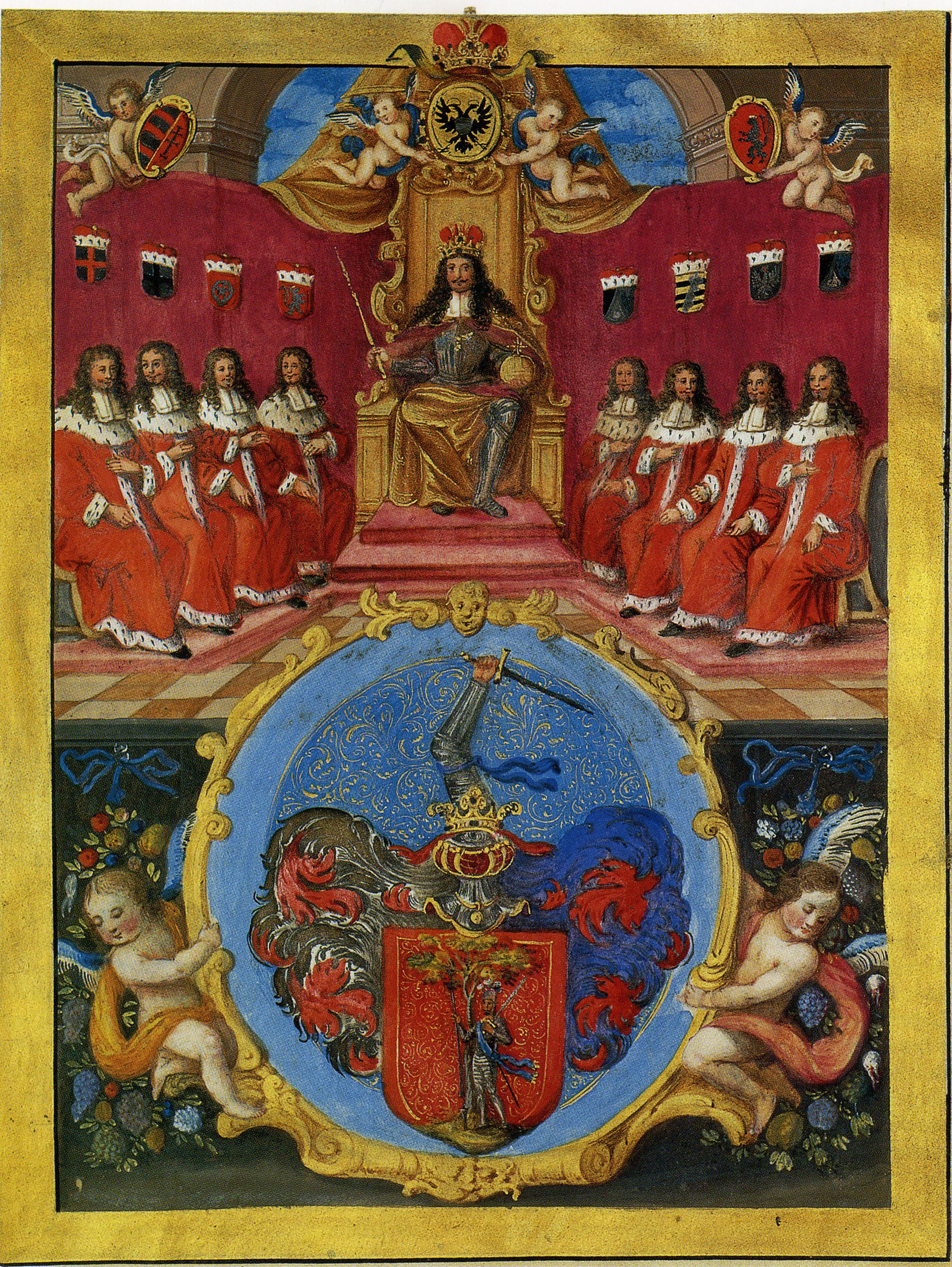
The coat of arms of Upstalsboom, awarded by Emperor Leopold I in 1678 to the East Frisian estates. Having its own coat of arms underlines the power that the estates had in the county.

Initially, legal disputes in East Frisia were always resolved internally and never outsourced to higher courts in the Holy Roman Empire. In East Frisia, the counts had the de facto privilege of not appealing, the so-called Privilegium de non appellando. This allowed the count to prohibit his subjects from appealing to the Reichskammergericht or Aulic Council against judicial decisions. The Frisians argued that they had received this privilege from the Holy Roman Emperor. However, there is no historical evidence that this right was actually given to them. It is even highly unlikely. Nevertheless, this did not stop the counts of East Frisia from pretending that they did possess this privilege. In both the East Frisian law of 1518 and the ordinance of 1545 by Anna of Oldenburg, there was no mention of the possibility of an appeal to an imperial court. When a fratricidal war arose between the counts Edzard II and Johan II in the sixteenth century, however, the judiciary in the Holy Roman Empire became increasingly involved in local disputes in East Frisia. Since then, more appeals from East Frisia were submitted to the imperial courts than from any other area of the Empire.

==== Chancery court and court of justice ====
In 1545, Anna of Oldenburg issued a decree that was supposed to regulate all kinds of matters in East Frisia in the area of administration and jurisdiction. In addition to administrative tasks, the chancellery now also had a role in the jurisdiction of East Frisia. This created a so-called chancery court. The count had a great influence on the appointment of the court members and scholars of this court, which initially meant that the jurisdiction in East Frisia was firmly under his control. When in the sixteenth century the brothers Edzard II and Johan II came into conflict with each other about the rule in East Frisia, the East Frisian estates insisted on the establishment of an independent court of justice. On the orders of Emperor Rudolf II in 1589, this court was established in 1593, despite fierce protests from Edzard II. It was located in the capital Aurich. During the seventeenth century, the East Frisian estates gained increasing influence; they determined the composition and responsibilities of this court. At the same time, there was now the chancery court, which was under great influence of the count, and on the other hand, the court of justice, which was under strong influence of the East Frisian estates. This created a situation that there were two competing courts that were in conflict with each other about the jurisdiction in East Frisia. This was a confusing situation for the inhabitants of East Frisia, and anyone seeking justice could turn to the court where he had the best chance of success. However, the importance of the court of justice, which was dominated by the estates, increased more and more, while that of the chancery court decreased.

==== Chancery court in Esens ====
It was not until 1600 that the East Frisian counts acquired Harlingerland. At that time, the judiciary in this area had developed in its own right, separate from the judiciary in the rest of East Frisia. Harlingerland had its own chancery court in Esens, which was considerably powerful. Major civil cases were settled before this court. It also functioned as an appeals court for the local courts in the ämter Esens and Wittmund and the city of Esens. If a defendant disagreed with a verdict, an appeal could be lodged with the chancery court in Aurich. The inhabitants of Harlingerland could not appeal to an imperial court because the privilege of not appealing that the Duke of Gelre had also applied to the Harlingerland when it became a fief of the Duchy of Gelre. All in all, Harlingerland thus had a special legal position within the county of East Frisia.

=== Transition to the Prussian period ===
Towards the end of the seventeenth century, the conflicts between the East Frisian estates and the prince became increasingly violent. As both sides sought external aid, East Frisia increasingly came under the influence of foreign rulers. In 1744, the Prussians took over East Frisia. With this, the independence of East Frisia disappeared and also in the area of jurisdiction, the autonomy disappeared. From then on, Prussian law prevailed over East Frisian law. The highest court of appeal became the Kammergericht in Berlin. Aurich became the capital of Prussian East Frisia and all kinds of judicial bodies were united and established in this city. Furthermore, the position of landrichter disappeared. Finally, the unique position that the Harlingerland had had within East Frisia disappeared. From now on, this area also fell under the jurisdiction of a court in Aurich. On 15 February 1750, the Prussian King Frederick II obtained the privilege of not appealing for East Frisia.

== Administrative division ==
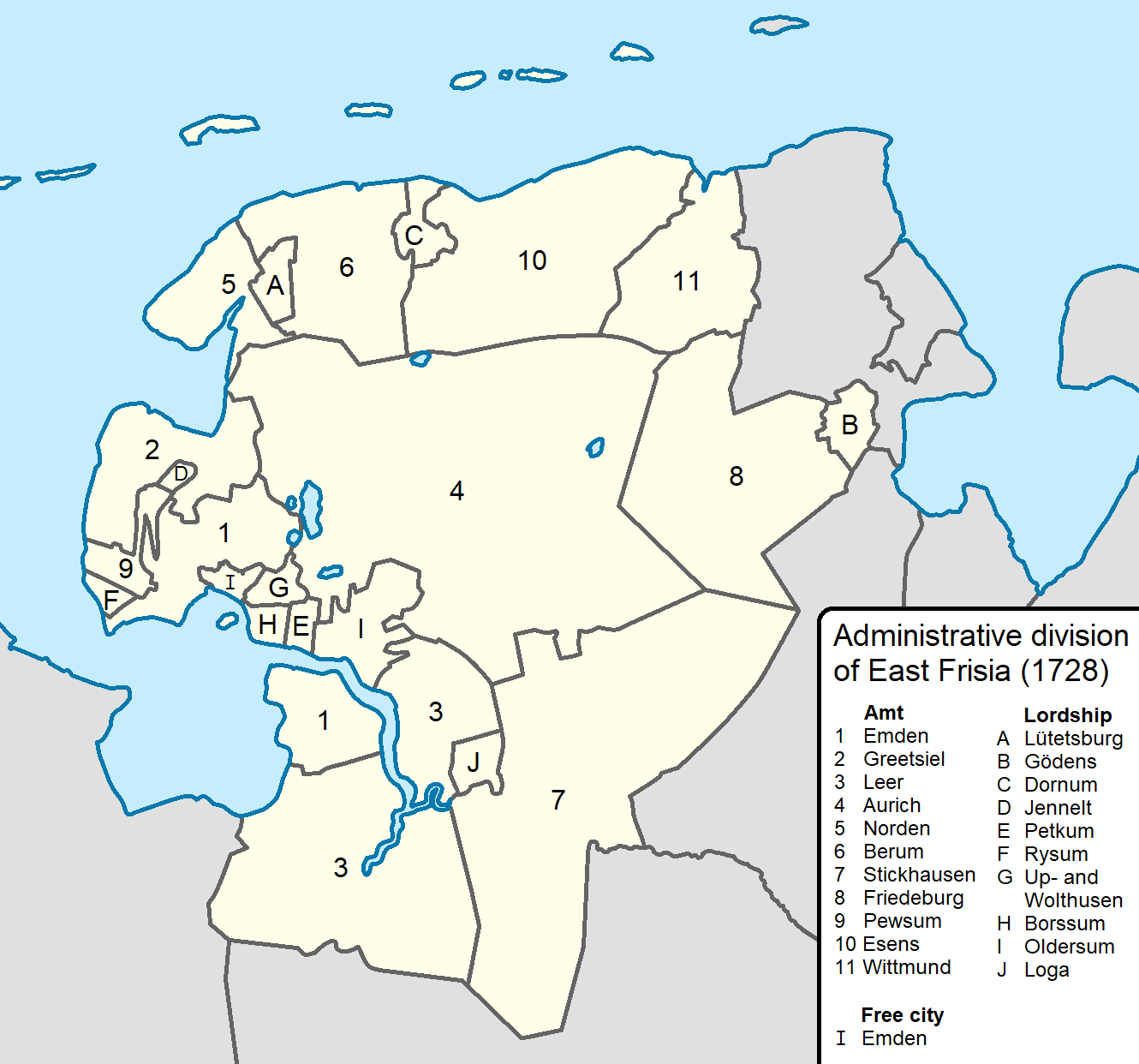
Administrative division of East Frisia (1728)

=== Ämter ===
==== On the mainland ====
With the accession of the Cirksenas as counts of East Frisia, they also brought with them a new administrative structure. The old system of ancient, historical regions such as Brokmerland or Overledingerland disappeared. In its place came a structure in the form of ämter (districts). Old chieftain castles such as Berum, Aurich, or Emden became the administrative center of an amt. This also applied to strategic forts that were constructed, such as Stickhausen, Leerort, and Friedeburg. In the early years of the County of East Frisia, the Ämter Lengen and Marienhafe (Brokmerland) also existed. However, at the end of the fifteenth century, Amt Marienhafe was absorbed into the Amt Aurich. The Amt Lengen, on the other hand, was incorporated into the Amt Stickhausen in 1535. Furthermore, the Amt Friedeburg was added to the amt structure by Theda Ukena in 1481. This brought the total number of ämter to eight: Emden, Greetsiel, Leer, Aurich, Norden, Berum, Stickhausen and Friedeburg. After the Treaty of Berum of 1600, two new Ämter were added: Esens and Wittmund in the Harlingerland. The last addition came in 1610 after the death of Catherine Vasa, the wife of Count Edzard II. She had ruled as sovereign lady in her own name over the lordships of Loquard, Campen, Woquard and Pewsum. After her death, these lordships were merged into the newly formed Amt Pewsum. This established the final number of eleven ämter into which East Frisia was divided. Each amt, except for Amt Pewsum, was further subdivided into so-called Vogteien. For example, Amt Norden consisted of the Vogteien Westernmarsch and Lintelermarsch. At the head of an amt was the Amtmann, later also called the Drost. In addition to a civil task, the Amtmann also had judicial and military responsibilities as head of his district.

==== On the islands ====
In 1728, the county of East Frisia included six Wadden Islands. From west to east, these were Borkum, Juist, Norderney, Baltrum, Langeoog and Spiekeroog. The islands were part of one of the ämter. Borkum belonged to the Amt Greetsiel, Juist to the Amt Greetsiel until 1591, then to the Amt Aurich and after 1715 to the Amt Norden, Norderney and Baltrum to the Amt Berum and Langeoog and Spiekeroog to the Amt Esens. Nevertheless, the islands were not fully integrated into their amt and they retained a large degree of autonomy within the amt. The power of the sovereign on the islands was therefore very great; it was virtually unlimited. The islanders therefore had fewer rights than the East Frisians on the mainland.

In 1728 the county of East Frisia included the following ämter:

Location	Amt	Established in
	Emden	1464
	Greetsiel	1464
	Leer	1464
	Aurich	1464
	Norden	1464
	Berum	1464
	Stickhausen	1464
	Friedeburg	1481
	Esens	1600
	Wittmund	1600
	Pewsum	1610

=== Lordships ===
Before the foundation of the imperial county in 1464, East Frisia consisted of a patchwork of small areas of power of stronger and weaker chieftain families. These families derived their power from land ownership, the exercise of public offices and the construction of numerous castles, fortresses and palaces. Some chieftains only gained power within their own village, while other chieftains gained control of several villages or even entire districts. When Ulrich I was inaugurated as imperial count in 1464, several chieftains were knighted with him. The status of these chieftains was very vague for a long time. Some chieftains only owned a stronghold with surrounding lands. Other chieftains, however, succeeded in obtaining sovereign rights and authority over the judiciary in their area. This gave rise to the so-called lordships.

In 1728, there were ten of these lordships. They were under the control of a lord who in turn had a dependency relationship with the sovereign of East Frisia. The number of lordships could fluctuate over time. For example, the last lord of Pewsum and Woquard, Hoyko Manninga, had run into financial difficulties and sold these lordships to Count Edzard II in 1565. Furthermore, the Lordships of Loquard and Campen were also sold to Edzard II in 1568. Sometimes new lordships were also created. In 1642, Ulrich II gave the lordship of Loga, also called Evenburg, in fief to Erhard von Ehrentreuter. The count had debts to the colonel that he could not repay. Von Ehrentreuter built a castle, the Evenburg, named after his wife Eva of Ungnad. The lordship also included the village of Logabirum.

In 1728 the county of East Frisia included the following lordships:

Coat of Arms	Location	Lordship	Lord in 1728
		Lordship of Lütetsburg	Carl Philipp zu Inn- und Knyphausen
		Lordship of Gödens	Burchard Philipp von Frydag
		Lordship of Dornum	Haro Joachim von Closter (Norderburg); Beatrix Dorothea Beninga (Beningaburg)
		Lordship of Jennelt	Friedrich Ernst zu Inn- und Knyphausen
		Lordship of Petkum	Pieter Hieronymus Ripperda
		Lordship of Rysum	Benjamin von Honstede
		Lordship of Up- and Wolthusen	Free City of Emden
		Lordship of Borssum	Free City of Emden
		Lordship of Oldersum	Free City of Emden
		Lordship of Loga	Erhard Friedrich von Wedel-Jarlsberg

=== Cities ===
==== Emden, Aurich, Norden and Esens ====
The cities of Emden, Aurich, Norden and Esens were not part of any of the ämter. The city councils were sovereign within the jurisdiction of the city. Norden probably received city rights in the thirteenth century and is therefore considered the oldest city in East Frisia. The city of Aurich received city rights in 1539. This city became the capital of East Frisia in the same year because all government institutions moved to Aurich from Emden. In 1561 the count and his court followed. The city of Esens received city rights from Balthasar Oomkens in 1527. When Harlingerland became part of East Frisia in 1600, Esens continued to function independently of the surrounding amt. The city of Emden never formally received city rights. However, a few regulations and rights received in the fourteenth century do indicate that Emden actually had all the characteristics of a place with city rights. In 1595 the city revolted against the East Frisian count, which marked the beginning of the period in which Emden effectively held the position of Free Imperial City within the County of East Frisia.

=== Unclear status of the Rheiderland ===
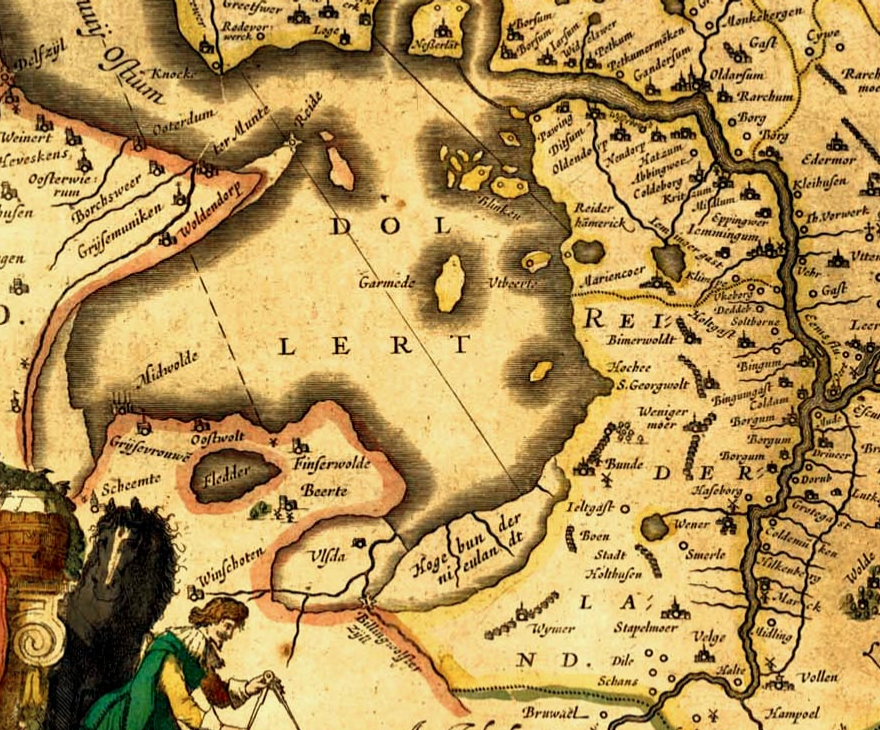
Rheiderland around 1600, by Ubbo Emmius

In all descriptions of the County of East Frisia signed by the Holy Roman Emperor, no mention is made of Rheiderland. In the original deed of 1464, East Frisia is described as lying between the Westereems and the Weser rivers. The 1495 forgery by Count Edzard I also makes no mention of the East Frisian areas west of the Ems. It was not until 1600 that Count Enno III included Rheiderland in the description of his county. The East Frisians explained why this did not happen until 1600 that they wanted to secure their rule against the Dutch gewest of Stad en Lande. The people of Groningen were involved in the Eighty Years' War and could well lay claim to Rheiderland. The unclear status of Rheiderland came to light when the Counts of Waldeck, as descendants of Count Edzard I, claimed part of his inheritance. The Counts of Waldeck attempted to demonstrate that Rheiderland, as an allodium, was the private property of the Cirksenas and thus represented an economic value to which they believed they were entitled. The East Frisians defended themselves by demonstrating that East Frisian land law had always applied in Rheiderland and that this area was therefore undeniably part of the County of East Frisia. On June 18, 1673, all uncertainty was resolved: the Reichskammergericht in Speyer declared that Rheiderland was, and always had been, a full part of the County of East Frisia.

== See also ==
- East Frisia
- East Frisia (peninsula)
- History of East Frisia
- List of counts of East Frisia
- List of East Frisian people
- Lordships of Esens, Stedesdorf and Wittmund
