= List of medieval Gaue =

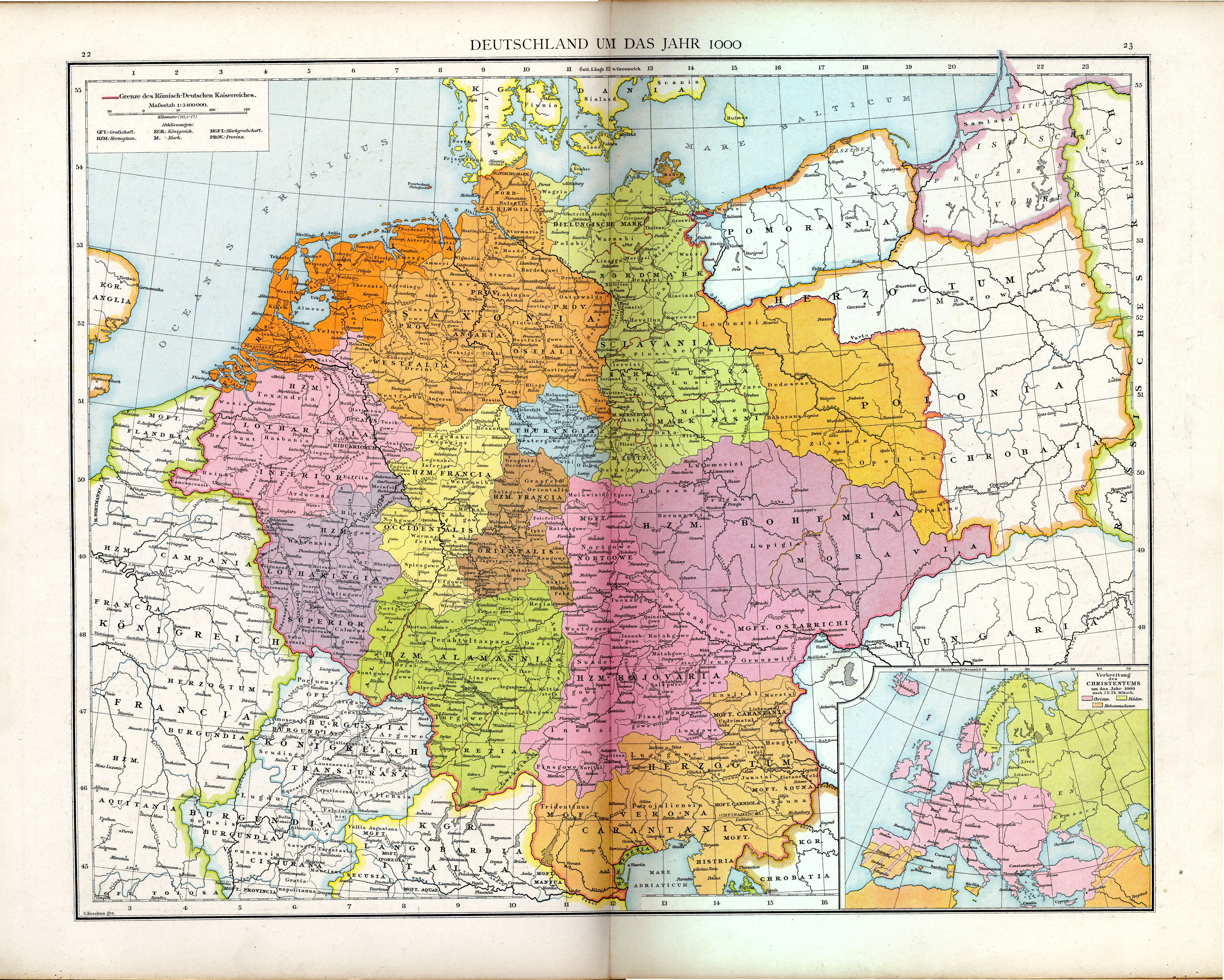
A map showing the Gaue of the Kingdom of Germany around the beginning of the 11th century

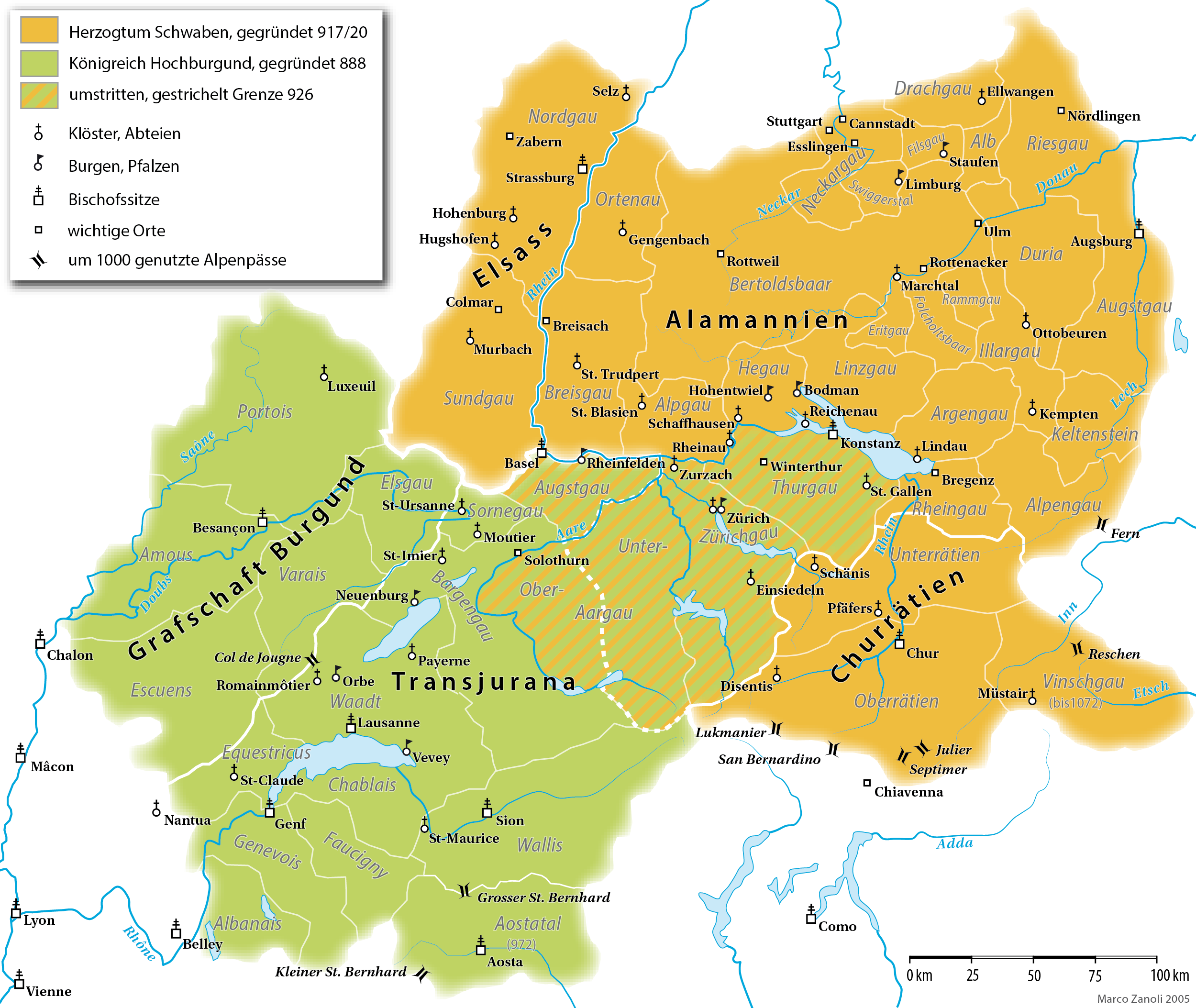
A map showing the Gaue/pagi of the Duchy of Swabia and Upper Burgundy around the beginning of the 11th century

The following is a list of German Gaue which existed during the Middle Ages.

It lists the names of the Frankish or German Gaue, many of which are still used today regionally, primarily in local traditions. Their locations are often no longer widely known, but are known from publications.

== Duchy of Bavaria ==
- Ammergau: along the upper Amper in Upper Bavaria, bounded in the south by the Ammergau Alps; sub-gau of Sundergau
- Attergau: along the Ager in Upper Austria, around the Attersee (lake)
- Chiemgau: between the middle Inn and the Traun in Upper Bavaria, around the Chiemsee
- Donaugau: along the upper Danube in Lower Bavaria and Upper Palatinate, around Straubing; modern Gäuboden and eastern Hallertau
- Huosigau: between the upper Isar and the Amper in Upper Bavaria, around Lake Starnberg; lands of the Huosi family; sub-gau of Sundergau
- Inntal: the middle Inn valley in Tyrol, divided into the Upper Inn Valley and Lower Inn Valley
- Isengau: between the lower Isar and the lower Inn in Lower Bavaria, around Vilsbiburg
- Künziggau: along the lower Vils in Lower Bavaria, east of Vilshofen
- Lungau: the upper Mur river valley in Salzburg, around Tamsweg
- Mattiggau: along the Mattig in Upper Austria, around Mattighofen; the eastern two thirds of the Innviertel
- Norital: the Eisack river valley and the upper half of the Etschtal in South Tyrol, around Bolzano and Brixen
- Pinzgau: the upper Salzach and upper Saalach river valleys in Salzburg, around Zell am See
- Pongau: a portion of the upper Salzach and the upper Enns river valleys in Salzburg, around St. Johann im Pongau
- Gau Pustertal: the Rienz and upper Drava river valleys in South Tyrol, bounded by the Dolomites in the south, the Zillertal Alps in the north, and the Villgraten Mountains in the east
- Rotagau: along the lower Inn and the lower Rott in Lower Bavaria and Upper Austria, south of Passau
- Salzburggau: along the middle Salzach in Salzburg, around Salzburg (city)
- Schweinachgau: between the upper Danube and the Bohemian Forest in Lower Bavaria, the eastern portion of the Bavarian Forest
- Sundergau: along the upper Isar in Upper Bavaria, around Munich; some sources show Sundergau extending to the south and east of the Inn to include the Inntal and Chiemgau
- Traungau: along the Traun in Upper Austria, between the Hausruck hills and the Enns
- Viehbachgau: between the lower Isar and the Vils in Lower Bavaria, around Dingolfing
- Vinschgau: the upper Adige river valley in South Tyrol, west of Merano
- Walchengau: along the upper Isar in Upper Bavaria, around the Walchensee
- (Bavarian) Westergau: along the Paar and the middle Isar in Upper Bavaria, around Freising and Neuburg

=== Margraviate of the Nordgau ===
- Egerland: along the Ohře in far northwestern Bohemia, around the city of Cheb(German: Eger)
- Kelsgau: along the upper Danube at the confluence with the Paar and the south bank of the Altmühl in Upper Bavaria, around Ingolstadt
- Knetzgau: along the south bank of the upper Main in Upper Franconia, northeast of Bamberg, located farther east of the modern municipality of Knetzgau
- Mainwenden: territory of the Slavic tribes or Wends along the upper Main in Upper Franconia, around Bayreuth
- (Bavarian) Nordgau proper: along the Naab and the eastern Franconian Jura, roughly coterminous with the Upper Palatinate
- Radenzgau: along the lower Regnitz in Upper Franconia and northern Middle Franconia, between the Steigerwald and the northern Franconian Jura
- Gau Ruppmannsburg: between the Altmühl and the lower Franconian Rezat in Middle Franconia
- Sulzgau: along the Sulz (now the southern portion of the Rhine–Main–Danube Canal) in Middle Franconia, around Berching
- Volkfeld: along the south bank of the middle Main in Lower Franconia, east of the Maindreieck and west of Bamberg

=== Margraviate of Austria ===
- Gau Grunzwiti: between the lower Enns and the Traisen in Lower Austria; named for the village of Grünz
- Wachau: the Danube river valley between Melk and Krems in Lower Austria

== Duchy of Carinthia ==
- March of Carniola: along the upper Sava and the Krka in Slovenia; some sources show the March of Carniola extending south to the Kupa to include the northwestern portion of the March of Istria
- March of Istria: the Istrian peninsula in Croatia and Italy (Trieste) and along the northern bank of the Kupa in southern Slovenia; some sources show its territory as limited to the peninsula
- Gurktal: the upper Gurk river valley through the Gurktal Alps in Carinthia
- Jauntal or Jaun: between the upper Drava and the Karawanks in Carinthia, east of Klagenfurt
- Kroatengau or Gau Chrowati (literally 'Gau of the Croats'): along the upper Drava and the lower Gurk in Carinthia, around Klagenfurt and Villach
- Lavanttal: the Lavant river valley through the Lavanttal Alps in Carinthia
- Lurngau: along the upper Drava and its tributaries the Möll and the Gail in Carinthia, around Spittal an der Drau
- Sanntalgau or Souna: along the Savinja(German: Sann) in Slovenia (Lower Styria); together with Zistanfeld into Mark an der Sann, later split along the Sava into the Windic March/Lower Carniola and the County of Cilli
- Zistanfeld (Mark an der Drau): along the middle Drava(German: Drau) in Slovenia (Lower Styria), around Maribor

=== March of Styria ===
- Ennstalgau: along the middle Enns in Styria, around Liezen
- Hengistgau: along the middle Mur in Styria, south of Graz
- Undrimagau or Ingeringgau: the upper Mur river valley in Styria, around Judenburg
- Leobengau: along the upper Mur and the Liesing in Styria, around Leoben
- Mürztalgau: along the Mürz in Styria, around Mürzzuschlag

=== March of Verona and Aquileia ===
- Trentino or Tridentinus: along the middle Adige, roughly coterminous with Trentino
- March of Friuli or Forojuliensis: roughly coterminous with Friuli plus the Slovene Littoral (County of Gorizia)
- March of Verona proper: roughly coterminous with Veneto minus the Venetian Lagoon (Republic of Venice)

== Duchy of Franconia ==
=== East Franconia ===
- Aschfeld: between the middle Main and the Franconian Saale in Lower Franconia, south of Hammelburg; sub-gau of Saalgau
- Badanachgau: along the Grünbach in northern Baden-Württemberg (Tauber Franconia), between the Tauber around the Maindreieck, around Giebelstadt; roughly coterminous with Ochsenfurter Gau
- Baringau: along the Streu in Lower Franconia, in the central Rhön Mountains, around Fladungen
- Brettachgau: along the Brettach in northern Baden-Württemberg (Stuttgart region), between Neuenstadt and Mainhardt
- Buchonia or Buchengau: along the upper Fulda in eastern Hesse and Lower Franconia, bounded by the Rhön Mountains in the east, the Vogelsberg in the west, and the Franconian Saale in the south
- Elsenzgau: along the Elsenz and the south and west banks of the lower Neckar in northern Baden-Württemberg (Karlsruhe region and Stuttgart region), around Sinsheim
- Gartachgau: along the Lein (formerly called the Gartach) in northern Baden-Württemberg (Karlsruhe region); sub-gau of Elsenzgau
- Gollachgau: along the upper Tauber and upper Gollach in Middle Franconia and northern Baden-Württemberg (Tauber Franconia), around Rothenburg
- Gotzfeldgau: along the northern bank of the middle Main (the Maindreieck) in Lower Franconia, between Würzburg and Schweinfurt
- Grabfeld: along the upper Franconian Saale and upper Werra in Lower Franconia and southwestern Thuringia (Henneberg Franconia), bounded by the Thuringian Forest in the northeast, the Main in the south, and the Rhön Mountains in the west; some sources divide the gau into East Grabfeld in the southeast and West Grabfeld in the northwest
- Hassgau: along the northern bank of the middle Main in Lower Franconia, around Haßfurt and the Haßberge hills
- Iffgau: between the middle Main (the Maindreieck) and the Aisch in Lower Franconia and Middle Franconia, around Scheinfeld and the western Steigerwald hills
- Jagstgau: along the lower Jagst in northern Baden-Württemberg (Stuttgart region), between Bad Rappenau (lower end) and Mulfingen (upper end)
- Kochergau: along the middle Kocher in northern Baden-Württemberg (Stuttgart region), between Forchtenberg (lower end) and Gaildorf (upper end), around Schwäbisch Hall
- Maulachgau: along the upper Jagst and Bühler in northern Baden-Württemberg (Stuttgart region), around Crailsheim; named after the Maulach
- Murrgau: along the Murr in northern Baden-Württemberg (Stuttgart region), around Backnang
- Rangau: between the Franconian Rezat and the upper Aisch in Middle Franconia, bounded by the Franconian Heights and Steigerwald in the west and the Rednitz/Regnitz in the east, north of Ansbach
- Saalgau: along the Sinn in Lower Franconia, bounded by the Rhön Mountains in the northeast and the middle Main (the Maindreieck) in the south, around Hammelburg
- Schefflenzgau: along the Schefflenz and the Elz in northern Baden-Württemberg (Karlsruhe region), east of Mosbach in western Bauland; sub-gau of Wingarteiba
- Schozachgau: along the Schozach on the east bank of the lower Neckar in northern Baden-Württemberg (Stuttgart region), around Ilsfeld
- Sualafeldgau: along the upper Altmühl in Middle Franconia, bounded by the southern Franconian Jura in the southeast and the Franconian Heights in the northwest, around Gunzenhausen
- Sulmgau or Sulmanachgau: along the Sulm in northern Baden-Württemberg (Stuttgart region), at the confluence of the Kocher and the lower Neckar, northeast of Heilbronn
- Taubergau: along the middle Tauber in northern Baden-Württemberg (Tauber Franconia), around Bad Mergentheim, roughly coterminous with Main-Tauber-Kreis excluding Wertheim
- Tullifeld: along the upper Felda and Ulster in southwestern Thuringia (Henneberg Franconia), around Kaltennordheim; sub-gau of Grabfeld
- Waldsassengau: along the middle Main (between the Mainviereck and the Maindreieck) and the eastern Spessart mountains in Lower Franconia, around Lohr am Main
- Werngau: along the Wern in Lower Franconia, bounded by the middle Main in the east and west (the northern portion of the Maindreieck), east of Karlstadt am Main
- Wingarteiba or Wingartau: between the Neckar/Jagst and the Tauber in northern Baden-Württemberg (Rhine-Neckar), bounded by the Bauland in the south and the Odenwald mountains in the northwest, roughly coterminous with the Neckar-Odenwald-Kreis
- Zabergäu: along the Zaber on the west bank of the lower Neckar in northern Baden-Württemberg (Stuttgart region), around Brackenheim; sub-gau of Elsenzgau

=== West Franconia ===
- Anglachgau: along the lower Pfinz and Kraichbach on the right bank of the Upper Rhine in northern Baden-Württemberg (Karlsruhe region), around Bruchsal; sub-gau and northwestern half of Kraichgau
- Arfeld: along the upper Eder in southern Northrhine-Westphalia (Arnsberg region), around Bad Berleburg in the central Rothaar Mountains; sub-gau of Hessengau or Lahngau
- Bachgau: along the west bank of the lower Main in southern Hesse (Darmstadt region) and Lower Franconia, between the lower Gersprenz and the lower Mümling, around Großostheim; sub-gau of Maingau
- Einrich or Einrichgau: along the Aar on the right bank of the Middle Rhine in northeastern Rhineland-Palatinate and southwestern Hesse, bounded by the western Taunus mountains in the south and the lower Lahn in the north, around Heidenrod; some sources list Einrich as a sub-gau of Lahngau and show its territory extending east to the Weil
- Engersgau: along the Wied on the right bank of the Middle Rhine in northeastern Rhineland-Palatinate, around Montabaur in the western Westerwald; some sources list Engersgau as a sub-gau of Lahngau
- Enzgau: along the lower Enz and the upper Kraichbach in northern Baden-Württemberg (Karlsruhe region), around Mühlacker; sub-gau and southeastern half of Kraichgau
- Erdagau: along the Aar in Hesse (Giessen region), between the Dill and the Salzböde; sub-gau of Lahngau (split between Niederlahngau and Oberlahngau)
- Glemsgau: along the Glems in northern Baden-Württemberg (Stuttgart region), around Schwieberdingen
- Haigergau: between the Nister in northeastern Rhineland-Palatinate and the Dietzhölze in Hesse (Giessen region), bounded by the upper Sieg in the north and the Westerwald in the south, around Haiger; sub-gau of Niederlahngau
- (Frankish) Hessengau or Hassia: along the lower Eder and lower Fulda in Hesse (Kassel region), around Fritzlar and Kassel; some sources show Hessengau extending further west along the Eder to include much of Oberlahngau
- Kinziggau: along the lower Kinzig in Hesse (Darmstadt region), around Gelnhausen; sub-gau of Maingau
- Königssondergau or the Königs besonderer Gau ('King's special Gau'): along the right bank of the Middle Rhine in Hesse (Darmstadt region), around Wiesbaden; sub-gau of Rheingau
- Kraichgau: along the Kraichbach in northern Baden-Württemberg (Karlsruhe region and Rhine-Neckar), between the Upper Rhine and Enz, around Mühlacker and Bruchsal
- Niederlahngau or Unterlahngau: along the lower Lahn in western Hesse (Giessen region), around Limburg; some sources do not divide Lahngau into Nieder- and Ober-, and include Engersgau and Einrich as sub-gaue
- Oberlahngau: along the upper Lahn in northwestern Hesse (Kassel region), around Marburg; some sources do not divide Lahngau into Nieder- and Ober-, and instead have Hessengau extend further west into what would be Oberlahngau
- Lobdengau: along the lower Neckar at the confluence with the Upper Rhine in northern Baden-Württemberg (Rhine-Neckar), roughly coterminous with the western half of Rhein-Neckar-Kreis plus Mannheim and Heidelberg
- Maingau: along the lower Main in southeastern Hesse (Darmstadt region) and Lower Franconia, bounded by the Odenwald mountains in the southwest and Spessart mountains in the east, around Aschaffenburg
- Nahegau: along the Nahe in southeastern Rhineland-Palatinate, bounded by the Hunsrück uplands in the northwest and the North Palatine Uplands in the southeast, around Bad Kreuznach
- Niddagau: between the lower Nidda and eastern Taunus mountains in central Hesse (Darmstadt region), around Bad Homburg; sub-gau of Wetterau
- Oberrheingau ('Upper Rhine Gau'): between the lower Main and the Weschnitz on the right bank of the Upper Rhine in Hesse (Darmstadt region), west of Darmstadt; initially a sub-gau of the wider Rheingau, gradually treated as separate as 'Rheingau' began to refer only to the small territory west of Wiesbaden
- Perfgau: along the Perf and upper Lahn in southern Northrhine-Westphalia (Arnsberg region) and western Hesse (Giessen region), around Breidenbach; sub-gau of Oberlahngau or Hessengau
- Pfinzgau: along the upper Pfinz in northern Baden-Württemberg (Karlsruhe region), east of Karlsruhe and northwest of Pforzheim; sub-gau of Ufgau
- Rodgau: along the Rodau in southern Hesse (Darmstadt region), around the town of Rodgau; sub-gau of Maingau; notably absent from many atlas sources
- Vernagau or Pfirnihgau: between the lower Schwalm and the Efze, around Borken; sub-gau of Hessengau
- Plumgau: along the upper Gersprenz and the upper Mümling in southern Hesse (Darmstadt region), around Erbach in the northern Odenwald mountains; sub-gau of Maingau
- Rheingau: along the right bank of the Middle Rhine and the Upper Rhine, between Lorch am Rhein (lower end) and Lampertheim (upper end); initially a large gau with Oberrheingau and Königssondergau as sub-gaue, gradually came to identify a small territory along the right bank of the Rhine, west of Wiesbaden where the Middle Rhine meets the Upper Rhine
- Speyergau: along the Speyerbach in southern Rhineland-Palatinate, bounded by the Upper Rhine in the east, the Palatinate Forest in the west, and the Lauter in the south, west of Speyer
- (Frankish) Ufgau: along the right bank of the Upper Rhine in northern Baden-Württemberg (Karlsruhe region), bounded by the Upper Rhine in the west, the Enz in the southeast, and the Elsenz in the northeast, around Bruchsal and Karlsruhe
- Wetterau or Wettereiba: along the Nidda in eastern Hesse (Darmstadt region and Giessen region), bounded by the Fulda in the east, the Taunus mountains in the west, and the lower Main in the south, around Friedberg and the Vogelsberg mountains
- Wormsgau or Wormsfeld: along the left bank of the Upper Rhine and the North Palatine Uplands in southern Rhineland-Palatinate, west of Worms and south of Mainz
- Würmgau: along the upper Enz and the lower Nagold in northern Baden-Württemberg (Karlsruhe region), south of Pforzheim

== Frisia ==
- Gau Auricherland: eastern East Frisia
- Beveland: municipalities of Borsele, Goes, Noord-Beveland, Kapelle, and Reimerswaal (formerly separate islands) in Zeeland
- Bornegoa: southern Friesland
- Gau Brokmerland: western East Frisia
- Drenthe: Dutch province of Drenthe, south of Groningen
- Emsgau or Gau Emsigerland: at the mouth of the Ems, southwest East Frisia
- Federgo: western East Frisia
- Fivelgo: north Ommelanden along the Ems estuary, northeast of Groningen
- Flehite: along the Utrecht Hill Ridge in eastern Utrecht
- Fulnaho: the areas of Kop van Overijssel and Stellingwerven
- Germepi: eastern South Holland and western Utrecht, along the Oude Rijn and north of the Hollandse IJssel
- (het 'the') Gooi or Naardensland: southeastern North Holland, along the Markermeer across from Flevoland
- Gau Harlingerland: northern East Frisia
- Holtland: south of the Lek, along the Meuse (Dutch: Maas) and Waal, southeast of Rotterdam; origin
- Humsterland: northwest Ommelanden, northwest of Groningen
- Hunsigo: northwest Ommelanden along the Wadden Sea, north of Groningen
- Ijssel and Lek: between the Hollandse IJssel and Lek rivers, southeast South Holland (Krimpenerwaard) and southwest Utrecht (Lopikerwaard)
- Kennemerland or Kinhem: southern/central North Holland
- Gau Lengenerland: southeast East Frisia
- Masaland or Marsum: southern South Holland, north of Het Scheur and the Nieuwe Maas
- Gau Moormerland: southern Ostfriesland, at the mouth of the Ems river
- Nifterlake or Instarlake: Vechtstreek and Amstelland, along the Utrechtse Vecht
- Gau Norderland northwest East Frisia
- Noord-Twente or Norhttuianti: along the Overijsselse Vecht, northern County of Bentheim and northeast Overijssel
- Östringen: around Jever, modern Friesland kreis
- Ostergau or Eastergoa: northeast Friesland
- Gau Overledingerland: at the mouth of the Ems, southern East Frisia
- Gau Rheiderland: west bank of the mouth of the Weser
- Rijnland: middle South Holland, along the Oude Rijn; Rinland
- Gau Rüstringen: east and south of the Jadebusen
- Salland or Salon: western half of Overijssel, along the lower IJssel and lower Overijsselse Vecht
- Schouwen: municipalities of Schouwen-Duiveland, Tholen (formerly an island), and western coastal North Brabant around Bergen op Zoom
- Sudergoa: along the northeast shore of the IJsselmeer (formerly Lake Almere), north of Lelystad
- Teisterbant: south of the Lek, along the Meuse (Dutch: Maas) and Waal, west of Nijmegen; Testarbant
- Texla: the island of Texel, Vlieland, and Terschelling
- Twente: eastern half of Overijssel
- Gau Veluwe: between the IJssel, Lek, and IJsselmeer
- Gau Voorne: islands of Voorne-Putten and Goeree-Overflakkee (Westvoorne/Goeree and Zuidvoorne/Overflakkee) which at various points in history were all one island or separate islands
- Walcheren: formerly a separate island, around Middelburg
- Gau Wangerland: on the North Sea, east of East Frisia
- (Frisian) Westergau or Westergoa: western Friesland
- Gau Westflinge: northern North Holland, largely coterminous with West Friesland
- Wiron: municipalities of Wieringen and Wieringermeer in northern North Holland, former island with some territory submerged in the Wadden Sea; possibly part of Texla
- Wursten: coastal Lower Saxony north of Bremerhaven

== Lotharingia ==
=== Lower Lotharingia ===
- Aachengau or Pagus Aquensis: around Aachen
- Ahrgau: on the Ahr in the north of Rhineland-Palatinate
- Ardennengau: along the Ardennes Forest, at the tripoint of Germany, Belgium and Luxembourg
- Auelgau: around the Siebengebirge and along the Sieg, east of Bonn
- Betuwe or Batavia: along the middle Waal, between the lower Meuse (Dutch: Maas) and Lek
- Bonngau: around Bonn, on the left bank of the Lower Rhine
- Pagus of Brabant: between the Scheldt and Dyle, western Flemish Brabant and southwestern East Flanders
- Cambresis or Kamerijkgouw: at the headlands of the Scheldt river, around Cambrai
- Condroz: south of the Meuse, east of Namur
- Deutzgau: along the lower Wupper on the right bank of the Lower Rhine, east of Cologne
- Düffelgau: on the Lower Rhine, roughly between Cleves and Xanten
- Eifelgau: in northern Eifel
- Gildegau or Gellepgau: on left bank of the Lower Rhine, north of Neuss and across from Duisburg; often confused with Gillgau and/or shown on the right bank of the Rhine (Ruhrgau); named after the Roman castra Gelduba
- Gillgau: on the left bank of the Lower Rhine, northwest of Cologne
- Hamaland: eastern Gelderland, partly coterminous with the Achterhoek
- Pagus of Hesbaye or Haspengouw: between Liège, Maastricht, Diest and Grand-Leez; north and west of the bend in the Meuse
- Hattuariergau or Hettergau: along the Niers, including Gennep and Geldern
- Hennegau or Hainau: along the upper Sambre
- Iselgo: along the western shore of the IJssel, between the Oude IJssel and Schipbeek, southeastern Gelderland
- Jülichgau: along the middle Rur, around Jülich
- Kölngau: on the left bank of the Lower Rhine, around Cologne
- Kützgau: along the Erft; only one documented mention in the year 898
- Liemers: between the Nederrijn and Oude IJssel rivers, east of Arnhem
- Lommegau or Lommatschgau: on the left bank of the Meuse, along the lower Sambre
- Luihgau or Liugas: between Liège and Aachen
- Maasgau: along part of the Meuse (Dutch: Maas) north of Maastricht
- Mühlgau: between the Maas and Niers
- Nievenheimgau or Neusser Gau: along the lower Erft, roughly coterminous with the modern municipalities of Neuss and Grevenbroich
- Odangau: on the left bank of the Lower Rhine, south of Bonn; untergau of Bonngau
- Gau Rijen or Rien: alonge the Nete river, around Antwerp, western Antwerp province
- Ruhrgau or Duisburggau: western Ruhrgebiet including Duisburg and Essen
- Toxandria: between the Meuse, Demer and Schelde rivers in the Belgian-Dutch border region
- Zülpichgau: along the upper Rur
- Waasland or Waasgau: north of the Schelde, northeast East Flanders

=== Upper Lotharingia ===
- Albegau: on the right bank of the upper Meurthe
- Alzettegau: along the Alzette
- Arelgau or Arlenais: along the headlands of the upper Semois, west of Luxembourg
- Barrois: along the Ornain, between the Marne and Meuse, southwest of Verdun
- Blois: along the upper Meuse, south of Verdun
- Bidgau or Bitgau: south Eifel around Bitburg
- Bliesgau: along the Blies
- Carosgau or pagus Caroscus: along the upper Kyll and the upper Prüm, around the town of Prüm; possibly named from the Belgic tribe of the Caeroesi
- Pagus Castricius: along the upper Meuse, around Charleville-Mézières
- Chaumontois: along the upper Meurthe and Moselle, southwest of Nancy
- Dulcomensis: between the Aisne and Meuse, northwest of Verdun
- Eichelgau: along the Eichel (Saar), southeast of Saarbrücken
- Hunsrückgau: in the western Hunsrück, along the Moselle, northeast of Trier
- Karosgau: along the Prüm in western Eifel
- Maifeld: at the confluence of the Middle Rhine and Moselle rivers, southwest of Koblenz
- Methingau: along the upper Alzette, around Luxembourg City
- Metzgau: along the middle Moselle, the area surrounding Metz
- Moselgau: along the lower/middle Moselle between Cochem and Metz; largely overlapping with territories in Bidgau, Metzgau, and Wavergau and possibly replaced early on by them
- Mosomensis: along the upper Meuse in the Ardennes, north of Verdun
- Niedgau: along the Nied, east of Metz
- Ornois: along the river Ornain between Lorraine and Champagne
- Rizzigau: along the midde Moselle, around Thionville
- Saargau: along the Saar, sometimes divided into Upper Saargau around Sarrebourg and Lower Saargau around Wallerfangen
- Saintois: between the upper Meuse and Moselle, south of Toul
- Salingau or Saulnois; along the Seille
- Sauergau: along the Sauer in Luxembourg
- Scarponagau or Scarponois: along the middle Moselle, roughly between Toul and Metz
- Soulossois: along the upper headlands of the Meuse, southwest of Toul
- Toulois: on the upper Moselle, around Toul
- Trechirgau: between the lower Moselle and the left bank of the Middle Rhine, in the eastern Hunsrück
- Triergau: on the right banks of the Saar and Moselle, southeast of Trier
- Verdungau or Verdunois: along the upper Meuse, around Verdun
- Wavergau or Woëvregau: between the Meuse and Moselle; Woëvre region in the southwest and Luxembourg in the northeast

== Duchy of Saxony ==
=== Angria ===
- Almango: north of the Ittergau/Nithersi, east of Angeron, south of the Patherga
- (Saxon) Ammergau: modern Ammerland
- Augau: in Lower Saxony, on the Weser around Höxter, west of Nethegau
- Bardengau: the territory around Lüneburg
- Bukkigau: the Kreis of Schaumburg, Lower Saxony (Bukki being an old form of Buche)
- Dervegau: between the Hunte and middle Weser rivers, north of Minden
- Grindirigau: between the Weser and the confluence of the Leine and Aller
- Haduloha: around Land Hadeln and Wursten (History of Hadeln and Wursten)
- Heilangau: Bremervörde, Buxtehude, Harburg, Stade
- (Saxon) Hessengau: in western Westphalia and southern Lower Saxony
- Lübbeckegauor Lidbekegau: from Lübbecke in Westphalia to the Dümmer See
- Ittergau or Nithersi: on the middle Eder
- Largau: along the lower Weser river, southwest of Bremen
- Leinegau or (Ober-)Leinegau: along the upper Leine around Göttingen
- Loingau or (Unter)-Leinegau: along the lower Leine and Aller rivers, northeast of Celle
- Liesgau: in southern Lower Saxony; western Harzvorland
- Marstemgau: around Hanover
- Moringen: along the Moore (Leine) river, tributary of the Leine river
- Moside: along the Elbe river south of Hamburg
- Nethegau or Netgau: around Brakel and Bad Driburg in Westphalia
- Ostegau: along the Oste river on the Elbe estuary
- Osterburg-Gau: in the Weserbergland
- Padergau: around Paderborn
- Rittigau: around Northeim, southern Lower Saxony
- Sintfeld: south of Paderborn, Bürener Land
- Soratfeld: southeast of Paderborn, Bürener Land; sometimes considered part of Padergau
- Sturmigau: modern Verden district; from Hoya on the right of the Weser at the confluence with the Aller
- Suilbergau or Sülberggau: west of the Leine around Einbeck in Lower Saxony with central court (Gerichtsstätte) around Strodthagen
- Theotmelli: territory around Detmold (ancient name Tietmelli or Theotmalli)
- Tilithigau: around Bad Pyrmont, southern Lower Saxony
- Treveresgau: around Salzkotten, Paderborner Land
- (Saxon) Waldsassengau or Waldeston: between Bremen and Zeven
- Werregau or Wehsigau: along the Werre river, west of the Weser
- Wetigau: the Schwalenberg area in the district of Lippe
- Gau Wigmodien: north of Bremen

=== Eastphalia ===
- Ambergau: along the Nette, around Bockenem
- Aringen or Erichsgau: along the middle Leine, around Alfeld
- Astfala or Eastphaliagau: north of Hildesheim, west of Brunswick
- Balsamgau or Gau Balcsem, modern Saxony-Anhalt
- Derlingau: east of Brunswick
- Gau Drevani or Drawehn: along the Elbe and Jeetzel rivers, southwest of Lüneburg
- Gau Flenithi or Flenthiga: in Gandersheim/Winzenburg region
- Flutwidde: along the lower Fuhse, south of Celle
- Friesenfeld: between Allstedt and Merseburg
- Gretinge: north of Celle
- Gudingau or Godingon: around Elze in the Saale valley up to the Leine
- Harzgau: Harz mountains
- Hassegau: between Mansfeld, Naumburg, Halle and Wettin
- Liergau or Leragau: between the Fuhse and Oker
- Nordthüringgau: on the left bank of the Elbe, around Magdeburg; territory of the Thuringii which had become part of the Stem Duchy of Saxony
- Gau Osterwalde: northern and eastern Altmark
- (Easphalian) Salzgau or Saltgau: around Salzgitter
- Schwabengau: western Saxony-Anhalt
- Scotelingau or Scotelingen: west and northwest of Hildesheim
- Valedungen or Valothungau: southwest of Halberstadt, along the Leine river
- Wenzengau or Densigau: around Goslar
- Wikanafeld: around Eschershausen; an untergau of Gudingau

=== Nordalbingia ===
- Danish March or Mark Schleswig: between the Eider river and the Danevirke
- Dithmarschen: northwest of Hamburg in western Schleswig-Holstein
- Holstengau: south-central Schleswig-Holstein
- Limes Saxoniae: largely uninhabited and unfortified border area running from the Kieler Förde to the Elbe river east of Hamburg; technically not a gau though sometimes shown as such
- Stormarn: at the mouth of the Elbe, around Hamburg

=== Westphalia ===
- Agradingau: covered territory in the north of the modern German Landkreis of Emsland and the Westerwolde in the Netherlands, between Aschendorf and Meppen
- Angeron or Angerngau: northwest of the Ittergau/Nithersi
- Brukterergau: along the Ruhr river
- Bursibant: along the middle Ems around Rheine in the Münster region
- Dersagau: between Vechta and Damme
- Dreingau: in the Münster region, between Greven, Lippstadt, and Lünen
- Grönegau: around Osnabrück
- Hasegau: around Löningen in the west of Oldenburger Münsterland
- Lerigau: west of the middle Hunte up to the upper Soeste
- Lochtropgau: in the Sauerland
- Gau Saterland: southwest of East Frisia, part of the Seven Sealands and sometimes considered part of Frisia
- Skopingau: around Schöppingen
- Südergau: around Münster and Ahlen in the Münsterland
- Gau Threcwiti: east of the Großes Heiliges Meer
- Venkigau or Fenkingau: east of Gau Bursibant
- Westphaliagau: in the Ruhr and Lippe area, roughly corresponding with the eastern (Westphalian) part of the modern Ruhrgebiet

== Sclavonia ==
=== Billung March ===
- Gau Circipania or Zirzipanien: around the Teterower See in Mecklenburg-Vorpommern
- Kessinians: between the Warnow and Recknitz rivers, northeast Mecklenburg-Vorpommern, east of Rügen; sometimes considered to extend to the Peene and include Wostrose
- Obotrites or Abodrites: around the Wismar Bay, northwest Mecklenburg-Vorpommern
- Gau Polabia: between the lower Elbe and Lake Schwerin
- Rani or Rujani: island of Rügen and nearby northeast Mecklenburg-Vorpommern around Stralsund
- Wagria: Wagria peninsula in eastern Schleswig-Holstein, between Lübeck and Kiel
- Wanzlow or Bukow: island of Usedom and nearby northeast Mecklenburg-Vorpommern south of Wolgast
- Gau Warnabi: along the upper Warnow, between Lake Schwerin and Lake Müritz
- Wostrose: northeast of the Peene, west of Usedom, around Wolgast and Greifswald

=== Northern March ===
- Gau Desseri or Dassia, on the Dosse; possible extent eastward along the upper Havel
- Groswin: south of the Peene and southwest of Usedom, around Anklam
- Heveller: along the lower Havel, Havelland plus northern Zauche
- Gau Liezizi: between the lower Havel and Elbe
- Linones or Linagga: northern Prignitz, between the Elde and Elbe
- Meseritz: south of the Peene, northeast of Neubrandenburg
- Moraciani: on the eastern shore of the Elbe from Magdeburg up to Schartau
- Gau Murizzi: around the southern half of Lake Müritz
- Nielitizi or Brizanen: at the confluence of the Elbe and Havel rivers, southern Prignitz; the Brizanen are described as inhabiting the same area, though Nielitizi is more commonly attested as the name of the area/gau; sometimes confused with Neletizi
- Plote or Ploth: between the Peene and Tollensee, east of Demmin
- Redarier: southeast of Neubrandenburg and northeast of Neustrelitz
- Gau Retschanen or Rizani: eastern Brandenburg, northeast of Berlin
- Sprevane: along the lower Spree, the majority of Berlin and the area east
- Tollensians or Tholenz: north of the Tollensesee, northwest of Neubrandenburg, southeast of Lake Kummerow
- Ukrani: along the Ucker, roughly coterminous with the Uckermark
- Gau Zemzizi: along the Havel river, north of Brandenburg

=== Saxon Eastern March ===
- March of Lusatia: created in 965; gradually replaced title of Saxon East March
  - Gau Zerwisti or Ciervisti: at the confluence of the Elbe and Saale around Zerbst
  - Gau Coledizi: in Saxony-Anhalt, between Halle and Köthen
  - Lusitzi: roughly coterminous with Lower Lusatia
  - Gau Neletizi: east of the Saale around Nehlitz including Giebichenstein Castle (Halle)
  - Gau Nice: along the lower Neisse at the confluence with the Oder; poorly attested
  - Gau Nizizi: territory between the Elbe, Mulde and Black Elster
  - Gau Nudzici: east of the Saale between Halle and Bernburg
  - Gau Ploni or Planegau: southern Zauche and eastern Fläming, along the Plane; poorly attested, territory sometimes considered an extension south of the Heveller
  - Gau Selpuli: along the lower Spree and lower Neisse rivers, southeast of Berlin; northern portion of territory sometimes considered extension south of the Sprevane
  - Gau Serimunt: between the Saale, Mulde, Elbe and Fuhne
  - Gau Siusili or Susali: in the Leipzig Basin on the Mulde in Saxony
  - Gau Sorau or Zara: between the lower Bóbr and lower Neisse rivers, east of Cottbus
  - Gau Wolauki: along the middle Elbe, north of the Dübener Heide and south of Wittenberg; very poorly attested
  - Gau Zitizi or Citice: along the Mulde near the confluence with the Elbe, around Dessau; poorly attested, either a sub-gau of or split between Serimunt and Nizizi
- March of Meissen: created in 965; sometimes referred to as part of the Saxon East March, gradually seen as separate
  - Gau Glomacze or Daleminzi: along the upper Freiberger Mulde, east of Dresden
  - Gau Milceni: roughly coterminous with Upper Lusatia
  - Gau Niseni or Nisangau: along the middle Elbe, around Dresden
- March of Merseburg: created in 965; sometimes referred to as part of the Saxon East March, gradually seen as separate
  - Gau Chutizi: along the lower White Elster and Mulde, around Leipzig
- March of Zeitz: created in 965; sometimes referred to as part of the Saxon East March, gradually seen as separate
  - Brisingau: between the Saale and White Elster, west of Gera; sometimes shown divided between Orla and Strupenia, location guessed upon by scholars
  - Chutizi Orientalis: along the Chemnitz, around Chemnitz; sometimes depicted as part of Glomacze
  - Dobnagau or Gau Dobenau: along the upper White Elster, around Plauen, roughly coterminous with Vogtland
  - Gau Ducharin or Thucharini: along the middle White Elster, around Teuchern in Saxony-Anhalt
  - Gau Geraha: along the middle White Elster, around Gera
  - Gau Plisni or Pleißegau: between the White Elster and the Zwickauer Mulde, roughly coterminous with Pleissnerland
  - Gau Puonzowa: along the middle White Elster, around Zeitz
  - Strupenice or Strupenia: along the Gleise, east of Jena; multiple name variants, little attestation outside of name
  - Weitagau or Weitaha: on the right bank of the middle Saale, south and east of Naumburg; poorly attested
  - Gau Zwikau: along the upper Zwickauer Mulde, south of Zwickau; sometimes shown to extend east into Chutizi Orientalis

== Duchy of Swabia ==
- Apphagau: on the north bank of the upper Danube, around Riedlingen; sub-gau of Albuinsbar
- Gau Alba: northeastern portion of the Swabian Alb
- Albgau or Alpgau: along the north bank of the High Rhine, west of Schaffhausen; named after the Alb river
- Albuinsbar: between the Wutach and Breg; a subdivision of the Bertoldsbaar, some sources using Albuinsbar as an alternate name for the entire area
- Allgäu or Alpgau: along the upper Iller and upper Lech, bounded by the Allgäu Alps
- Argengau: along the Argen, between the Iller and Lake Constance
- (Eastern) Augstgau: along the lower Lech and Wertach, around Augsburg
- Bertoldsbaar or Perahtoltaspara: along the upper Danube, around the Swabian Alb; large territory consisting of several sub-gaus and huntares
- Breisgau: along the right bank of the Upper Rhine and the north bank of the High Rhine, around Freiburg
- Burichingagau: along the Lauchert, in the western portion of the Swabian Alb; sub-gau of Bertoldsbaar
- Drachgau: along the upper Kocher and upper Rems, around Schwäbisch Gmünd
- Duriagau: along the Günz and the Mindel
- Engadin: along the upper Inn, the upper most portion of the Inntal, in southern Graubünden
- Eritgau or Ertgau: along the southern bank of the upper Danube, around Bad Saulgau
- Filsgau: along the Fils, around Göppingen
- Folcholtsbaar: along the Riß, around Biberach
- Glehuntare: along the upper Würm, west of Stuttgart; considered a sub-gau of Bertoldsbaar in some sources
- Goldineshuntare: along the Ablach, around Krauchenwies; sub-gau of Linzgau or Bertoldsbaar
- Haistergau: along the Umlach and upper Riß, around Bad Waldsee; sub-gau of Folkoltsbaar
- Hattenhuntare: along the Starzel, around Hechingen
- Hegau: between the High Rhine and upper Danube, northwest of Lake Constance and northeast of Schaffhausen
- Illergau: along the middle Iller, around Memmingen
- Keltenstein: along the upper Lech, around the Forggensee; contains the Dengelstein a large boulder whose name is derived from Keltenstein
- Klettgau: along the north bank of the High Rhine, west of Schaffhausen; sub-gau of Albgau
- Linzgau: between the upper Danube and the northwestern half of Lake Constance
- Munderkinger Gau or Muntaricheshuntare: along the south bank of the upper Danube, around Munderkingen; sub-gau of Bertoldsbaar
- Munigiseshuntare: along the Lauter, around Münsingen; sub-gau of Bertoldsbaar
- Nagoldgau or Naglachgowe: along the upper Nagold, around Nagold; includes portions of the modern Korngäu and Heckengäu
- Neckargau: along the middle Neckar, near Stuttgart
- Nibelgau: along the Eschach, around Leutkirch; sub-gau of Argungau
- Nordgau: roughly coterminous with Bas-Rhin department, northern Alsace
- Ortenau or Mortenau: along the right bank of the Upper Rhine, around Offenburg
- Pfullichgau: along the Echaz, around Reutlingen
- Raetia Curiensis or Churrätien: along the Alpine Rhine, roughly coterminous with modern Graubünden; some sources consider Raetia its own province which included Rheingau, Engadin, and sometimes Vinschgau
- (Ober-)rätien or pagus Curiensis: north of the Landquart and the Rätikon mountains; some sources dispute the division of Raetia into two subdivisions
- (Unter-)rätien or pagus Raetia Curiensis: south of the Landquart and the Rätikon mountains; some sources dispute the division of Raetia into two subdivisions
- Rammachgau: along the Rot and the Dürnach, around Laupheim
- (Alemannic) Rheingau: along the Alpine Rhine at the confluence with Lake Constance, around Bregenz
- Riesgau: along the Kessel and the Nördlinger Ries, around Nördlingen
- Scherragau: between the upper Danube and the upper Neckar, in the southwestern Swabian Alb; subdivision of Bertoldsbaar
- Schussengau: along the Schussen and the northeastern bank of Lake Constance; sub-gau of Linzgau
- Schwerzgau or Swerzenhuntare: along the north bank of the upper Danube, southwest of Ulm; sub-gau of Bertoldsbaar
- Swiggerstal: along the Erms, around Metzingen
- Sülchgau: along the middle Neckar, around Tübingen
- Sundgau: roughly coterminous with Haut-Rhin department, southern Alsace
- Thurgau: along the Thur, between Lake Constance and Lake Zürich, the cantons of Thurgau, St. Gallen, Appenzell, and eastern Zürich; some sources include all of the territory of Zürichgau, stretching to the eastern shores of Lake Lucerne
- (Alemannic) Waldgau: along the upper Murg, around Freudenstadt, in the northern Black Forest
- Walgau/Welschgau or Val Druschauna: the Ill valley, southern Vorarlberg; sub-gau of Raetia Curiensis
- Zürichgau: between Lake Lucerne and Lake Zürich, the cantons of Zürich, Zug, Schwyz, Glarus, and Uri

== Duchy of Thuringia ==
- Altgau: along the Helbe river, between the upper Wipper and middle Unstrut, north of Erfurt and east of Mühlhausen; some sources indicate Altgau extending south of the Unstrut towards Erfurt, and north of the Wipper towards Nordhausen
- Eichsfeld: between the upper Unstrut and lower Werra, along the Hainich hills, around Heiligenstadt; larger than the modern region but without the Low Saxon territory around Duderstadt; some sources indicate Eichsfeld extending west of the Werra to include Eschwege
- Gau Engilin: along the lower Unstrut and the Finne hills, west of Naumburg
- Germar-Mark: along the lower Werra and upper Unstrut, centered on and named after Görmar, now in Mühlhausen; likely established as a mark to defend against the Saxons in the 9th century, gradually lost importance and was superseded by the gaues of Eichsfeld, Westergau, and Altgau
- Helmegau: along the Helme, around Nordhausen
- Husitingau or Usitigau: between the Ilm and Saale, southeast of Weimar; some sources describe as a sub-gau of Ostergau
- Längwitzgau: along the upper Ilm, around Ilmenau and Arnstadt
- Nabelgau: between the lower Wipper and Helme, along the Kyffhäuser hills, around Frankenhausen; some sources indicate Nabelgau extending west along the Wipper to include the territory of Wippergau as a sub-gau
- Natergau or Watergau: along the Notter, east of Mühlhausen; sub-gau of Altgau
- Ohmfeldgau or Ohnfelt: along the sources of the Leine and Wipper rivers, around Leinefelde; sub-gau of Eichsfeld
- Orlagau: along the upper Saale, around Saalfeld; some sources indicate it as a territory of the March of Zeitz, separated from Thuringia
- (Thuringian) Ostergau: along the lower Ilm, around Weimar; some sources indicate Ostergau extending west towards Erfurt and including the territory of Thüringgau
- Ringgau: along the middle Werra, southwest of Eisenach; sub-gau of Westergau
- Thüringgau or Südthüringgau: on the south bank of the middle Unstrut, along the Gera, around Erfurt; some sources omit this gau entirely and show its territory split between Westergau in the west, Ostergau in the east, and Altgau in the north
- (Thuringian) Westergau: along the middle Werra and the Hörsel, around Eisenach and Gotha
- Wiehegau or Wigsezi: between the lower Unstrut and Finne hills; some sources describe as a sub-gau of Engilin
- Wippergau: along the upper Wipper, around Sondershausen; some sources describe as a sub-gau of Nabelgau

== Outside the Kingdom of Germany ==
=== Duchy of Bohemia ===
- Bohemian tribes

=== Kingdom of Burgundy ===
- Lower Burgundy
  - List of pagi in Lower Burgundy
- Upper Burgundy
  - List of pagi in Upper Burgundy

=== Margraviate of Flanders ===
In Flanders, nineteen gaue were known under their mostly Latin name, in the area between the Scheldt and the Canche:

- pagus Flandriensis
- pagus Rodanensis
- pagus Wasia
- pagus Gandensis
- pagus Mempiscus
- pagus Curtrecensis
- pagus Tournacensis
- pagus Medelentisensis
- pagis Pabula
- pagus Caribant
- pagus Scarbeius
- pagus Ostrebantinus
- pagus Cameracensis
- pages Isseretius
- pagus Leticus
- pagus Atrebatensis
- pagus Tarvasensis
- pagus Bononiensis
- pagus Quentovic

=== West Francia/Kingdom of France ===
- List of medieval pagi

== Unknown or Mythological Gaue ==
- Gau Jom: controversial historical territory settled by and subject to the Jomsvikings as well as a Danish exclave on the Pomeranian coast
- Winidon: a supposed gau in eastern Thuringia listed in many sources; first listed in sources by error due to a hole in a historical document

== See also ==
- List of Alamannic pagi, a list of Gaue/pagi in the Stem Duchy of Swabia

== Sources ==
- August von Wersebe: Beschreibung der Gaue between Elbe, Saale und Unstrut, Weser und Werra, insofern solche zu Eastphalia mit Nord-Thuringia und zu Ost-Engern gehört haben, und wie sie im 10ten und 11ten Jahrhundert befunden sind. Hahn, Hannover 1829, Digitalisat.
- Wachter, Ferdinand (1852). "1: A – G. Theil 54: Gargano – Gauhe.". In Ersch, Johann S.; Gruber, Johann G. (eds.). Allgemeine Encyclopädie der Wissenschaften und Künste [General Encyclopedia of the Sciences and Arts] (in German). Leipzig: Brockhaus. pp. 405–449.
- Boettger, Heinrich. Diöcesan- and Gau-Grenzen Norddeutschlands zwischen Oder, Main, jenseits des Rheins, der Nord- und Ostsee. Von Ort zu Ort schreitend festgestellt [Diocese and Gau borders of northern Germany between the Oder, Main, beyond the Rhine, the North Sea and the Baltic Sea] (in German). Buchhandlung des Waisenhauses u. a., Halle u. a. 1875–1876:
  - Volume 1: Von Ort zu Ort schreitende Begrenzung von 31 Gauen und 10 Untergauen in 7 Bisthümern und 108 geistlichen Bezirken in Franken, nebst einer Gau- und einer dieselbe begründenden Diöcesankarte [From place to place progressing boundaries of 31 Gaue and 10 sub-Gaue in 7 bishoprics and 108 ecclesiastical districts in Franconia, in addition to a Gau map and a corresponding diocese map], 1875
  - Volume 2: Von Ort zu Ort schreitende Begrenzung von 40 Gauen und 39 Untergauen in 6 Bisthümern und 130 geistlichen Bezirken im Umfange der Provinz Hannover, nebst einer Gau- und einer dieselbe begründenden Diöcesankarte. [From place to place progressing boundaries of 40 Gaue and 39 sub-Gaue in 6 bishoprics and 130 ecclesiastical districts in the province of Hanover, in addition to a Gau map and a corresponding diocese map], 1874
  - Volume 3: Von Ort zu Ort schreitende Begrenzung von 43 Gauen und 24 Untergauen in 6 Bisthümern und 110 geistlichen Bezirken in Altsachsen und Friesland, nebst einer Gau- und einer dieselbe begründenden Diöcesankarte. [From place to place progressing boundaries of 43 Gaue and 24 sub-Gaue in 6 bishoprics and 110 ecclesiastical districts in Old Saxony and Frisia, in addition to a Gau map and a corresponding diocese map], 1875
  - Volume 4: Von Ort zu Ort schreitende Begrenzung von 60 Gauen and 11 Untergauen in 7 Bisthümern und 148 geistlichen Bezirken im Umfange des Slavenlandes, nebst einer Gau- und einer dieselbe begründenden Diöcesankarte. [From place to place progressing boundaries of 60 Gaue and 11 sub-Gaue in 7 bishoprics and 148 ecclesiastical districts in the lands of the Slavs, in addition to a Gau map and a corresponding diocese map], 1876
  - Gaukarte und eine dieselbe begründende Diöcesankarte zu den Diöcesan- und Gaugrenzen Norddeutschlands. [Gau map and a corresponding diocese map of the diocese and Gau borders of northern Germany], 1876
- Schultze, Walther (1896). Die fränkischen Gaue Badens [The Frankish Gaue of Baden] (in German). Stuttgart: Strecker & Moser.
- Müller, Ferdinand (1842). Die deutschen Stämme und ihre Fürsten, oder historische Entwickelung der Territorial-Verhältnisse Deutschlands im Mittelalter [The German Tribes and their Princes, or the Historical Development of German Territorial Conditions in the Middle Ages] (in German). Berlin.

== Bibliography ==
- De Maesschalck, Edward (2019). De Graven van Vlaanderen (861-1384) [The Counts of Flanders (861-1384)] (in Dutch) (2nd ed.). DavidsFonds / Standaard uitgeverij. ISBN 9789002268458.
