= Umlach =

River in Germany

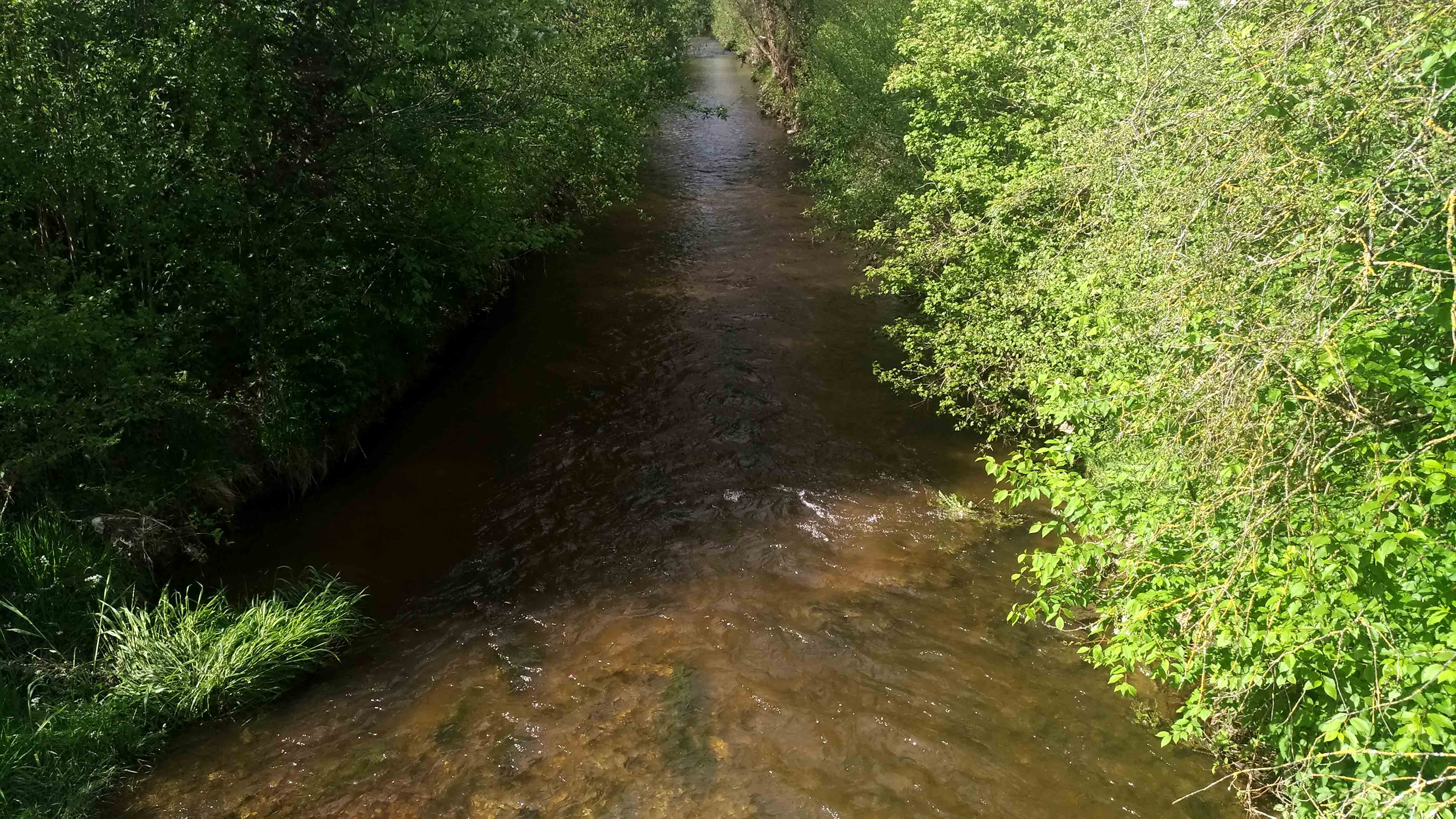

Location
- Country: Germany
- State: Baden-Württemberg

Physical characteristics
- Mouth
  - location: Riß
  - coordinates: 48.0783°N 9.8150°E
- Length: 23.1 km (14.4 mi)

Basin features
- Progression: Riss→ Danube→ Black Sea

Umlach is a river of Baden-Württemberg, Germany. It flows into the Riß near Biberach an der Riss.

== See also ==
- List of rivers of Baden-Württemberg
