= Alb Basin =

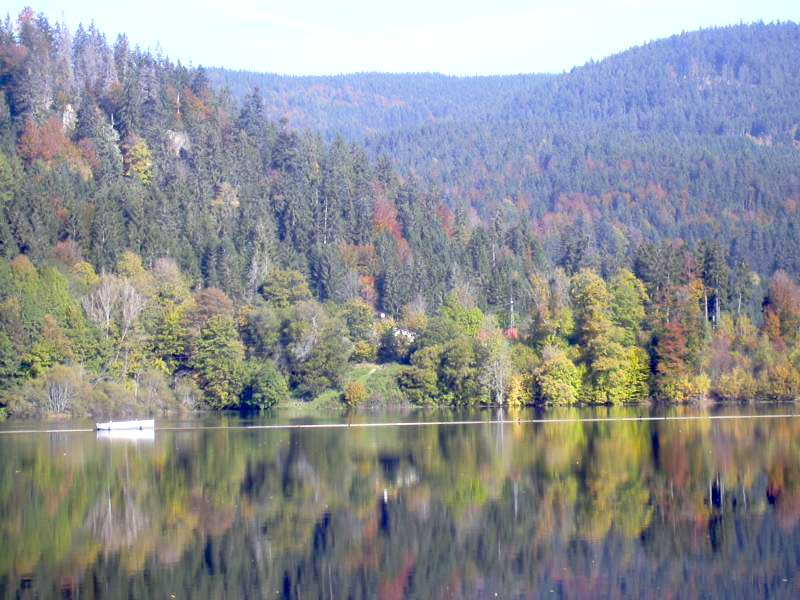
- The Alb Reservoir in the valley of the Alb
- Location: Waldshut in Baden-Württemberg
- Coordinates: 47.74667°N 8.14583°E
- Construction began: –1941
- Operator(s): Schluchseewerk

Dam and spillways
- Height: 28 m
- Length: 152 m
- Dam volume: 25,000 m^{3}

Reservoir
- Total capacity: 2.19 million m^{3}
- Maximum length: 1.600 km
- Maximum width: 0.320 km
- Normal elevation: 736.5 m

The Alb Reservoir (German: Albstausee), or Alb Basin (Albbecken) is a storage reservoir in the valley of the River Alb near St. Blasien in the Southern Black Forest in south Germany. It is part of the pumped storage network of the Schluchseewerk based at Laufenburg and lies between the lake of Schluchsee and the Rhine near Waldshut. The barrier is a 28-metre-high gravity dam.

== Geography ==
The Alb Reservoir lies in the valley of the Alb at about 737 metres above sea level (Normalnull). The nearest settlement is the town of St. Blasien (760 m ü. NN), whose trading estate in the south reaches the end of the lake.

The reservoir lies mostly on the territory of the town of St. Blasien; a smaller part of the lake in the west and the entire dam wall lie within the municipality of Dachsberg.

The Landesstraße 154 road which runs through the Alb valley, the Albtalstraße or "Alb Valley Road", leaves Albbruck on the Rhine and makes its way up the valley towards St. Blasien, running for about 1.4 kilometres along the eastern shore of the reservoir before reaching the town.

== Function ==
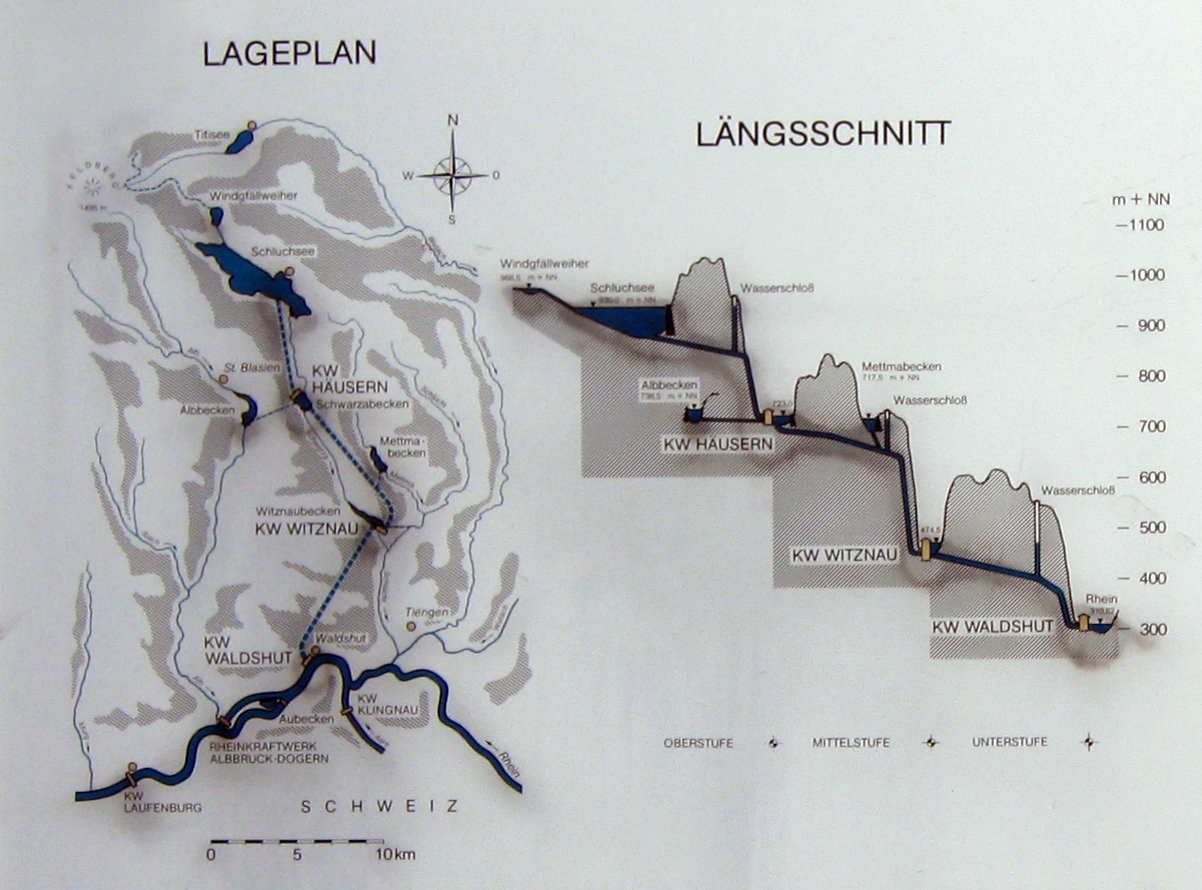
The location of the Alb Basin within the cascade of power stations in the Schluchsee Group

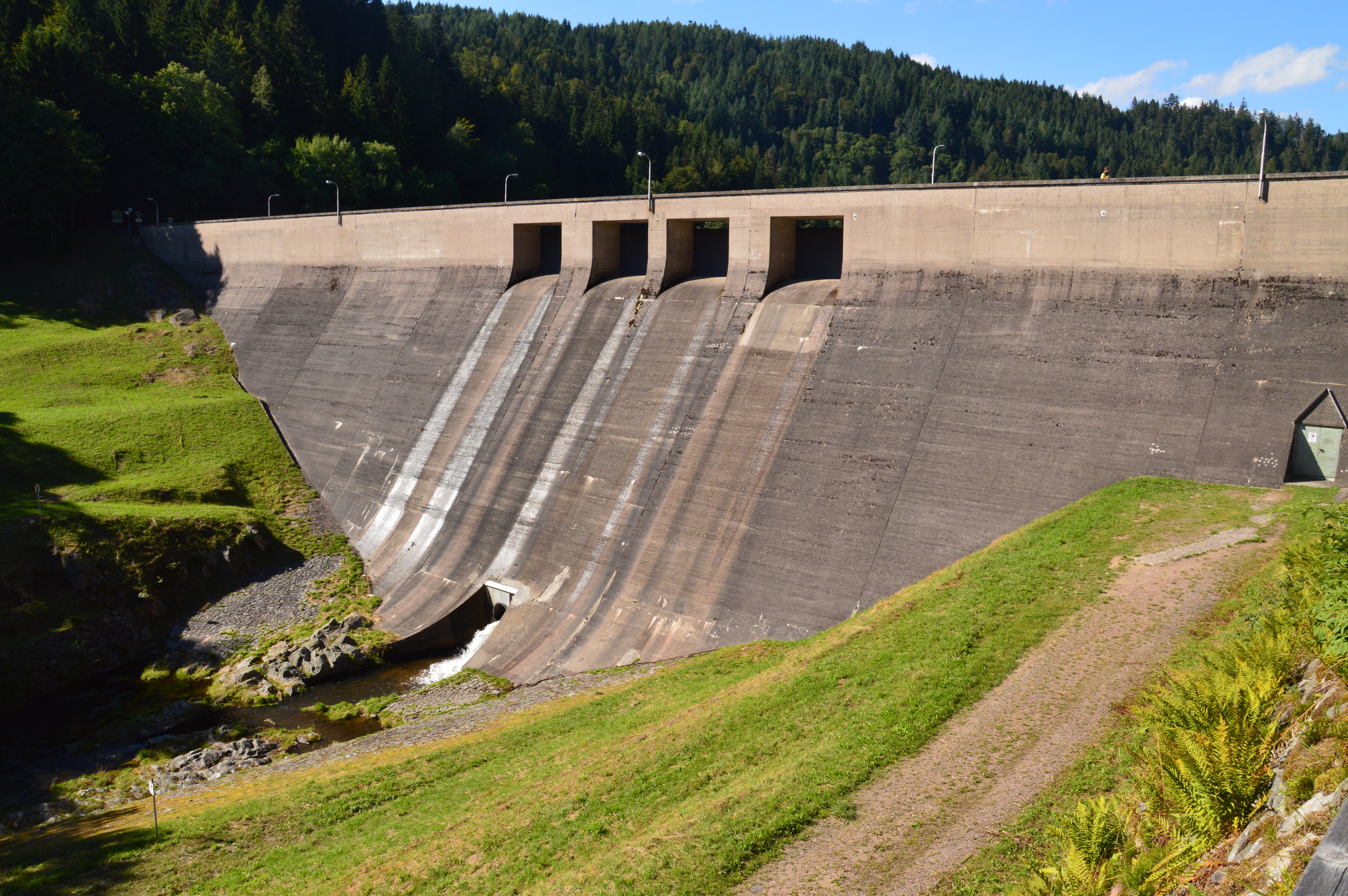
The dam wall

The Schluchseewerk is the company that runs the hydropower stations around the Schluchsee. In their network, the Alb Reservoir and its sister, the Mettma Reservoir in the valley of the Mettma, are one of two side arms linking the Schwarzabruck Reservoir (lower basin for the power station on the upper level (Oberstufe) and upper basin for the power station on the middle level (Mittelstufe) in the Schwarza valley.

== Environment ==
When the reservoir is cleaned out, the sediments are not taken to rubbish tips, but used to create a bird island.

== See also ==
- List of dams in Germany
- List of pumped-storage hydroelectric power stations
