= List of Alamannic pagi =

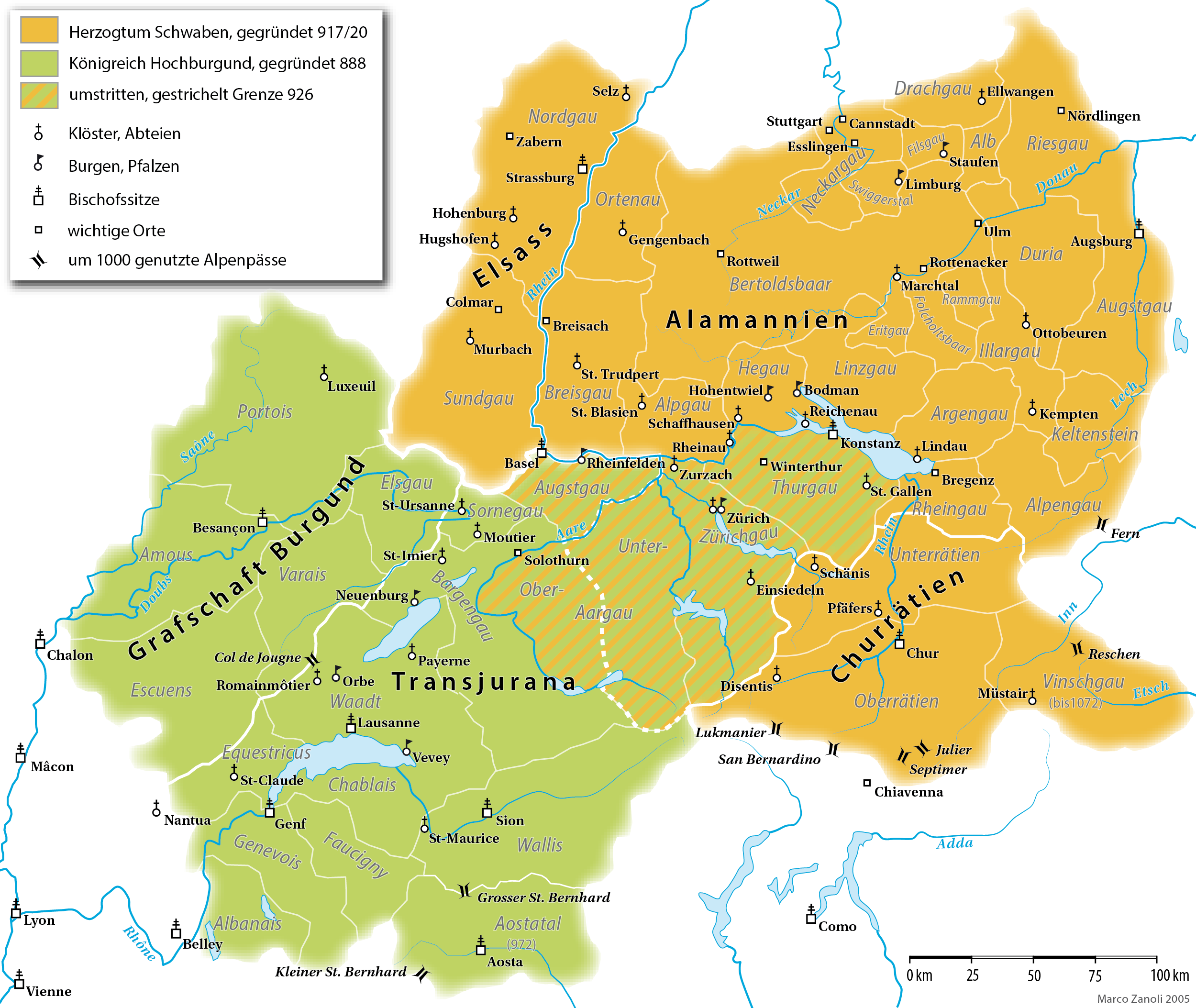
Map of Alamannia and Upper Burgundy in the 10th to 11th centuries.

The following is a list of pagi (the Latin term glossing Old High German gowe, corresponding to English shire) of the Frankish duchy of Alamannia (Swabia).

== History ==
In Alamannia under Frankish suzerainty (8th century), each pagus was ruled by a count (Gaugraf) who in turn responded to the duke of Alamannia. Many of the names of these territories survive in modern toponymy.

The county of Raetia Curiensis was absorbed into Alamannia in the early 10th century, as Burchard II at the time of the proclamation of the duchy also held the title of count of Raetia Curiensis. It comprised the Ringowe (Rheingau; Bregenz), named for the Rhine, and Retia proper.

At the time of its formation in the 10th century, the younger stem duchy comprised the following provinces (pagi, gowe):

- Alba (Albuch)
- Albegowe (Alpengau, including part of the Lech valley)
- Alpegowe (Alpgau; St. Blaise)
- Argungowe (at the Argen River, Lindau)
- Augestigowe (surrounding Augsburg)
- Augestigowe (Augusta Raurica, Basel)
- Brisigowe (Breisgau; (Zähringen))
- Britgewe
- Duria (Duriagau, Burgau)
- Filiwigawe (Filsgau, named for the Fils River; Lorch, Staufen))
- Folcholtespara (Folcholtsbaar, Biberach)
- Hegowe (Hegau)
- Illargowe (named for the Iller; Kempten, Memmingen)
- Keltinstein (between Geltnach and Wertach, tributaries of the Lech)
- Linzgowe (Linzgau)
- Mortunova, the later Ortenau (Gengenbach)
- Nekargowe (named for the Neckar; Cannstatt)
- Nordgowe (Nordgau, northern Alsace, Bas-Rhin)
- Perahtoltaspara (Berchtoldsbaar; Ulm, Zollern, Falkenstein)
- Rammegowe (Rammachgau)
- Trachgowe (Drachgau, near Schwäbisch Gmünd)
- Turgowe (Thurgau, named for the Thur River)
- Rezia (Ries, ultimately from the name of the Roman province of Raetia; Nördlingen))
- Suntgowe (Sundgau, southern Alsace, Haut-Rhin)
- Swiggerstal (the modern Ermstal)
- Zurihgauuia (Zürichgau; Zürich, Einsiedeln, Engelberg) considered a subdivision of Turgowe but intermittently ruled by separate counts.

The territory between Alamannia and Upper Burgundy was known as Argowe (Aargau, Lenzburg) named for the Aare river). The pertinence of this territory to either Alamannia or Upper Burgundy was disputed.

Counties of the kingdom of Upper Burgundy:

- Burgundy (Franche-Comté)
  - Portuensis (Portois)
  - Amosensis
  - Scudinga
  - Warascum or Varesco, Warasgow
  - Alsgowe (Elsgau)
- Transjurania
  - Sorengowe (Sornegau)
  - Bargensis (Bargengau)
  - Wisliaeensis (the territory surrounding Avenches, German Wiflisburg)
  - Lausonensis (Lausanne)
  - Equestricus (Nyon, lat. Colonia Iulia Equestris)
  - Genevensis (Geneva)
  - Albanensis (Albanais)
  - Falcinensis (Faucigny)
  - Caputlacensis (Chablais)
  - Vallensis (Valais)
  - Ausicensis (upper Saane valley)
  - Ufegowe (Ufgau in what is now the Lake Thun region of the Bernese Oberland, not to be confused with Ufgau (Baden))
