= History of Thurgau =

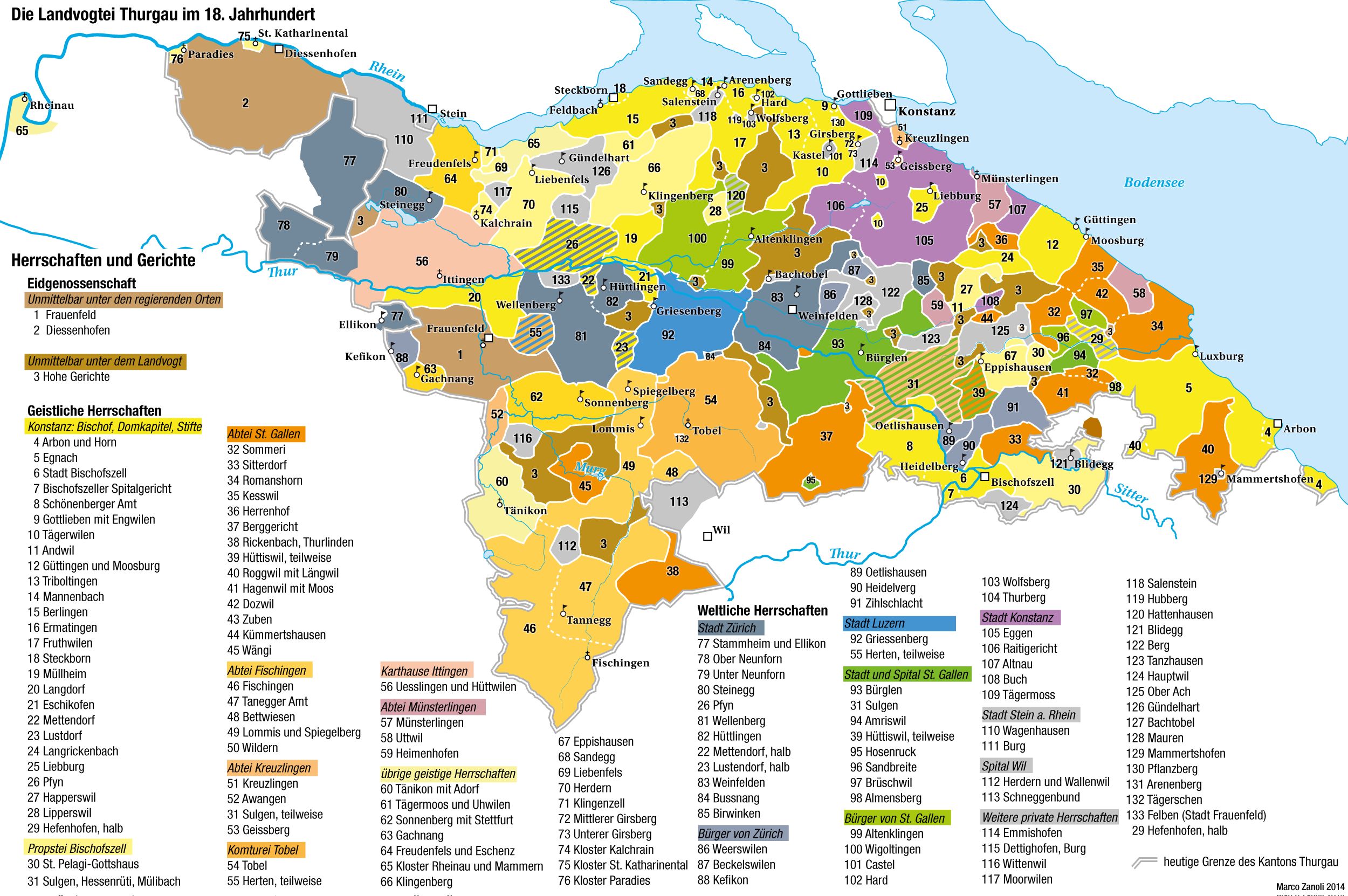
Map of the Landvogtei Thurgau in the mid 18th century

The Thurgau (Turgowe, Turgovia) was a pagus of the Duchy of Alamannia in the early medieval period. A County of Thurgau (Landgrafschaft Thurgau) existed from the 13th century until 1798. Parts of Thurgau were acquired by the Old Swiss Confederacy during the early 15th century, and the entire county passed to the Confederacy as a condominium in 1460.

The county became the Canton of Thurgau within the Helvetic Republic in 1798, and with the Act of Mediation of 1803 a canton of the restored Confederacy.

== Alamannic pagus ==
The Turgowe pagus within Alamannia was named for the Thur, and it included the entire Alamannic territory between Upper Rhine and Reuss. With the Alamannic settlement of Central Switzerland in the 6th to 8th centuries, Turgowe included most of what is now Northeastern and Central Switzerland. Odilo, son of duke Gotfrid, was count of Turgowe between 709 and 736 (when he acceded as duke of Bavaria). After the Council of Cannstatt, a Frankish nobleman named Warin is recorded as count in Thurgau for the year 754.

In the 9th century, Zürichgau was detached from Thurgau, so that Thurgau was now bounded to the west by the Töss basin. (the Allmen range west of the Töss), corresponding in area to what is now Thurgau, Appenzell, parts of St. Gallen (Fürstenland and Toggenburg), and the parts of Zürich east of the Töss. Hunfriding counts of Thurgau in the 9th to 10th centuries include Adalbert II (854, 894), Udalrich (912, 917) and Burchard III (920).

With the Battle of Winterthur (919), Burchard II, Duke of Swabia asserted his control over the Thurgau against the claims of Rudolph II of Burgundy. The most important cities of Thurgovia in the early medieval period were Constance as the seat of the bishop, and St. Gallen for its abbey.

== County of Thurgau ==
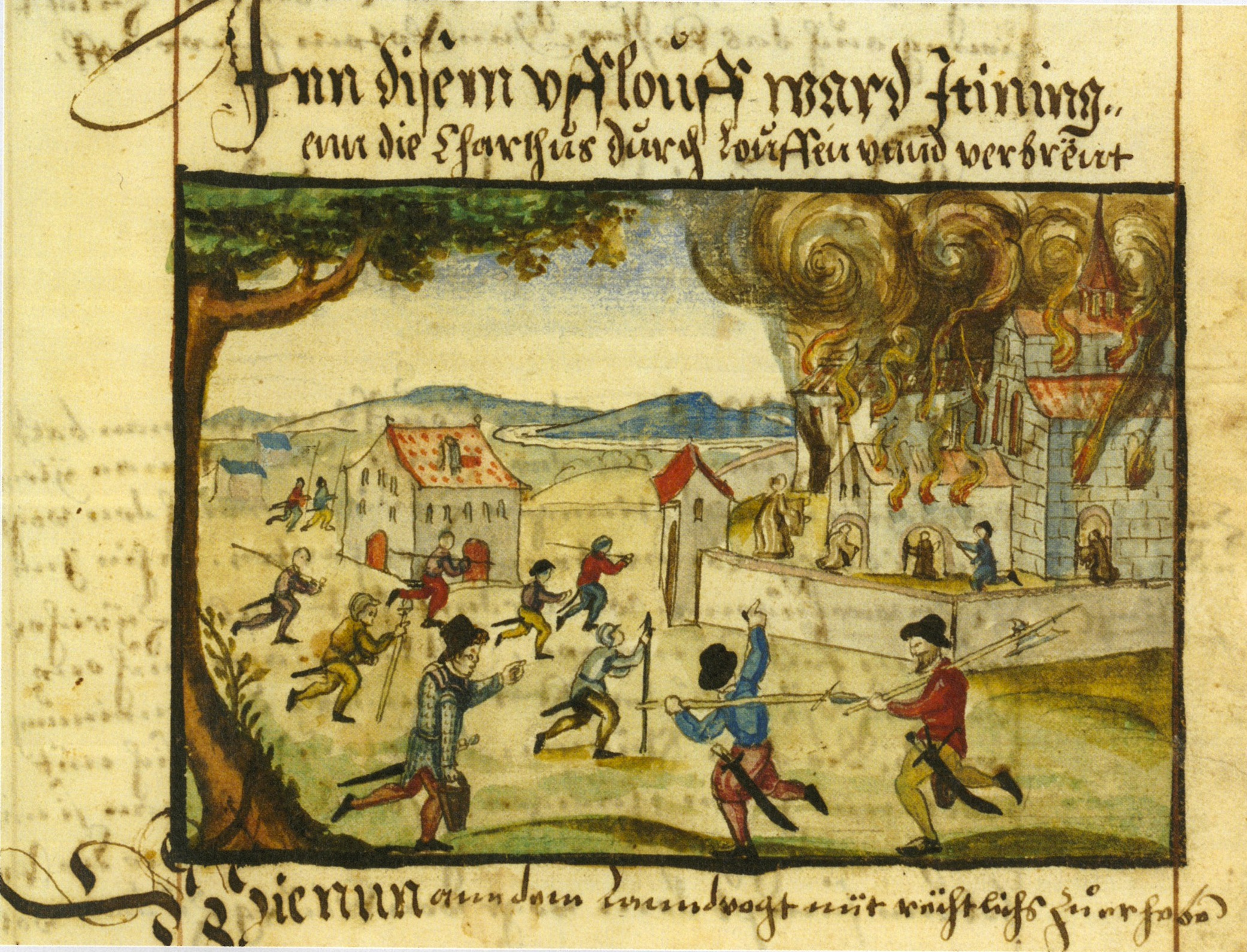
Destruction of Ittingen Charterhouse in the Swiss Reformation 1524 (Heinrich Thomann, c. 1605)

The dukes of Zähringen and the counts of Kyburg took over much of the land in the High Middle Ages. With the extinction of the counts of Kyburg in 1264, control of the Thurgau reverted to the Habsburgs.

The Old Swiss Confederacy allied with ten freed bailiwicks of the former Toggenburg seized the lands of the Thurgau from the Habsburgs in 1460, and it became a subject territory of seven Swiss cantons (Zurich, Lucerne, Uri, Schwyz, Unterwalden, Zug and Glarus).

During the Protestant Reformation in Switzerland, both the Catholic and emerging Reformed parties sought to swing the subject territories, such as the Thurgau, to their side. In 1524, in an incident that resonated across Switzerland, local peasants occupied the Charterhouse of Ittingen in the Thurgau, driving out the monks, destroying documents, and devastating the wine-cellar. Between 1526 and 1531, most of the Thurgau's population adopted the new Reformed faith spreading from Zurich, but Zurich's defeat in the War of Kappel (1531) ended Protestant predominance. Instead, the First Peace of Kappel protected both Catholic and Reformed worship, though the provisions of the treaty generally favored the Catholics, who also made up a majority among the seven ruling cantons. Religious tensions over the Thurgau were an important background to the First War of Villmergen (1656), during which Zurich briefly occupied the Thurgau.

== Modern history ==
Coat of arms of Thurgau (1803).

Thurgau became an administrative unit of the Helvetic Republic in April 1798. It acceded the Swiss Confederacy as a full canton with the Act of Mediation of 1803. A new, liberal cantonal constitution was drawn up in 1831. Thurgau sided with the anti-Catholic party in the Kulturkampf in Switzerland, dissolving its monasteries in 1848. The electorate supported the Swiss Constitution of 1848 and its revision in 1874. A new constitution of 1869 strengthened elements of direct democracy introducing the popular referendum and the direct election of the cantonal executive. The current cantonal constitution dates to 1987.
