= Henneberg Franconia =

Coordinates: 50°30′N 10°30′E

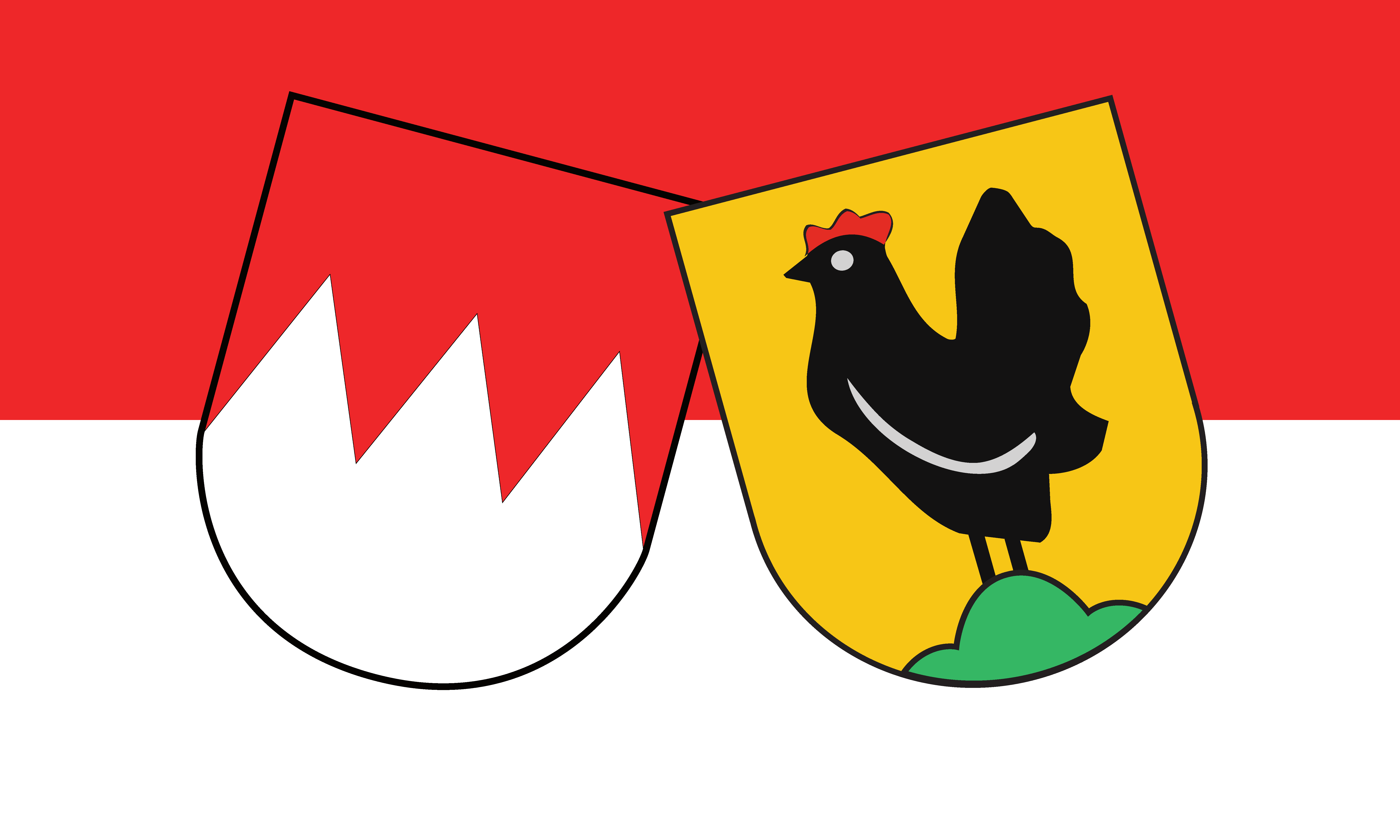
Flag of Henneberg Franconia

Henneberg Franconia (German: Henneberg-Franken) is an historically correct term for the Franconian part of the Free State of Thuringia in Germany that is generally referred to as South Thuringia (Südthüringen). The region is almost exactly coextensive with that covered by the Planning Region of Southwest Thuringia, the Chamber of Industry and Commerce of South Thuringia, the Trades Chamber of South Thuringia and the Agricultural Office of Hildburghausen.

== Origin of the name ==
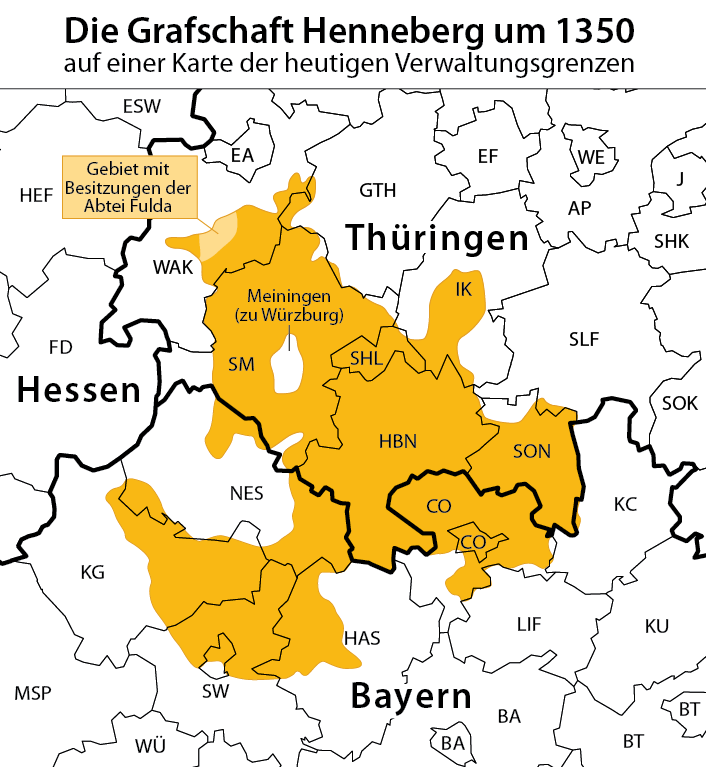
Henneberg Franconia today

The term relates to the Franconian Princely County of Henneberg at its largest extent in the mid-14th century when even the entire Pflege of Coburg belonged to it. The southern and easternmost parts of the County of Henneberg lie today in Upper Franconia, Lower Franconia and East Hesse. The society of Henneberg-Itzgrund-Franken has striven since mid-2013 to establish the name.

== South Thuringia ==
The historical South Thuringia, as part of the subsequent Landgraviate of Thuringia lies north of the Rennsteig way. The term South Thuringia is not only used for the southwestern part of the Free State of Thuringia, however. In its broader sense the relationship with Thuringia is wrong and misleading because the region is culturally part of Franconia. Even from a political standpoint, the region belonged to Franconia for a very long time and was only transferred to through inheritance and as a dowry from the Hennebergs to the territorial lordship of the Saxon Wettins and then subsequently to Thuringia.

== Henneberg Franconian ==
The term Henneberg Franconian (Hennebergisch-Fränkisch) is occasionally used as part of the name of clubs and societies and also in referring to Henneberg Franconian timber-framed architecture (Hennebergisch-Fränkischen Fachwerk).

== Dialect ==
The main dialects spoken in Henneberg Franconia are Main-Franconian Hennebergisch, Itzgründisch, Rhöner Platt and Grabfeldisch.

== External weblinks ==
- Henneberg-Itzgrund-Franken (society website)
- Henneberg Franconia v. South Thuringia (another website of the Henneberg-Itzgrund-Franken Soc.)
- Henneberg-Franconian History Society
- Outline of a historical and geographical description of the County of Henneberg (Journal von und für Franken)
- Henneberg districts in the Journal von und für Franken; (1790 to 1793)
