= Rammachgau =

The Rammachgau (also Rammagau) was a Gau in southern Germany in present-day Baden-Württemberg. The Rammachgau was located in northern Upper Swabia.

== Origin and name ==
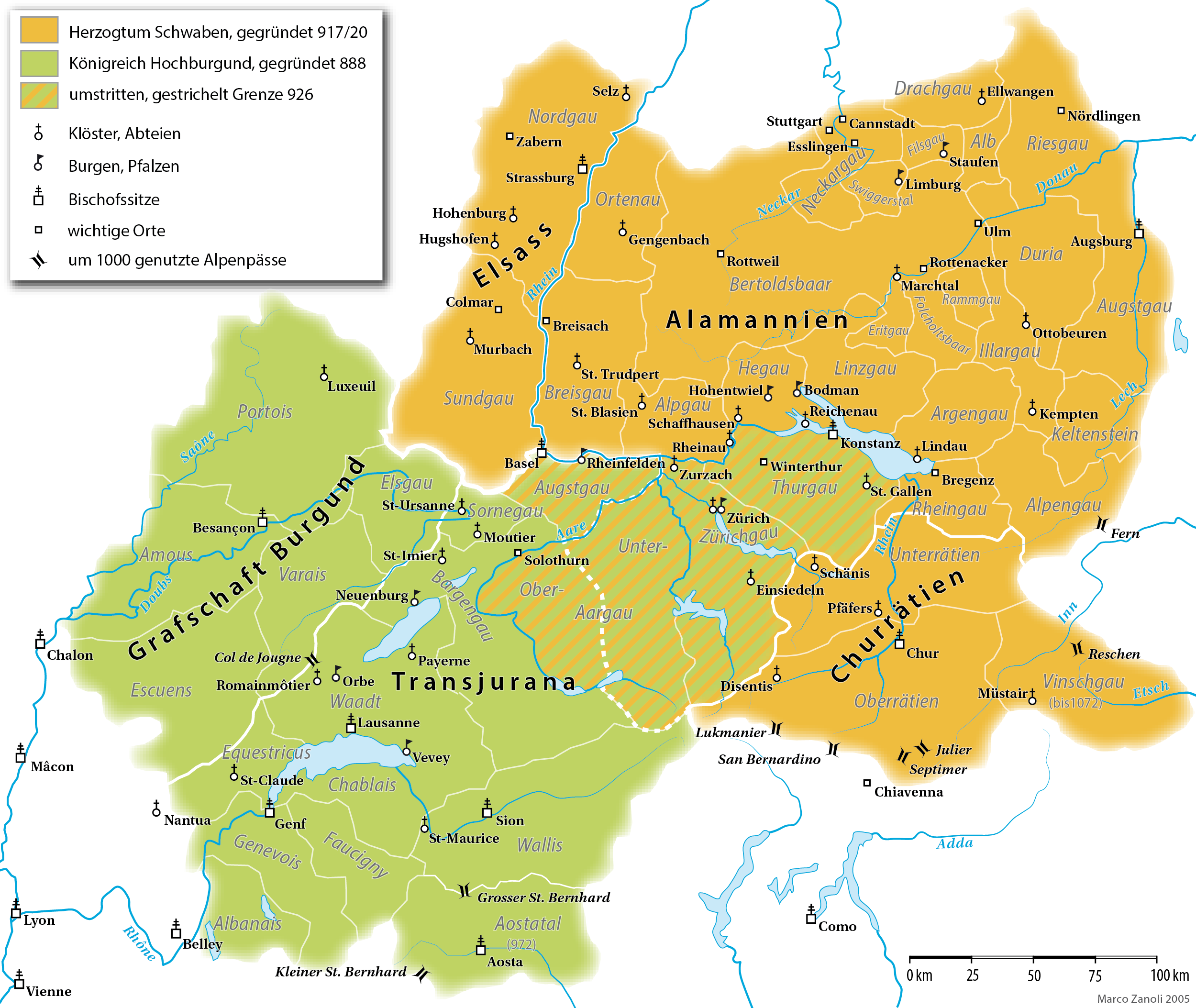
Alemannia (orange) and Upper Burgundy (green) around AD 1000, showing the location of the Rammachgau as "Rammgau"

After the resistance of the Alamannic nobles to Frankish rule had been overcome in 746, the Duchy of the Alamanni was administratively incorporated into the Frankish kingdom by implementing the Frankish units of administration there too. The Franks used the term Gau to denote a politico-geographical division within the Frankish kingdom. The term Gau was often suffixed to a distinctive geographical place name. One of these administrative units was the Rammachgau. The name of this administrative unit derived from the name of a river, or part thereof, called Rammach. The name of the river was subsequently lost. Contemporary documents refer to this administrative unit as Rammackeuui (778), Rammekevve (894), Rammichgowe (ca. 1070) and Rammechgowe (1099).

It has been suggested that the Rammachgau, together with the Nibelgau and the Illergau, belonged to a larger administrative unit called pagus Duria during the period of Carolingian rule.

The fall of the Hohenstaufen dynasty and the simultaneous dissolution of central authority in the 13th century gave the local nobility the opportunity to increase its independence from central authority. Consequently, various local rulers managed to establish authority over territories within the Rammachgau, rendering the old administrative units, based on counts as being the representative of the central authority, obsolete.

== Expanse ==
The Rammachgau stretched from the south at Altheim, Langenschemmern and Ochsenhausen to the north at Hüttisheim and Dellmensingen, from the west at Ingerkingen to the east at Burgrieden. The Rammachgau was bordered to the south by the Haistergau, to the east by the Illergau and to the west by the Ruadolteshuntare. To the north the Rammachgau bordered on the territory of the Illergau as well as the Ruadolteshuntare.

The area of settlement of the Rammachgau was marked by natural borders except to the north. The populated areas were all in, or close to, the valleys of the rivers Riß, Rottum and Rot. The borders were marked by large forests on the hills surrounding the rivers or by swampy areas unsuitable for agriculture.

The administrative centre of the Rammachgau was Laupheim.

== See also ==
- Gau
- Alamannia
- Upper Swabia
