= Alb (High Rhine) =

River in Germany

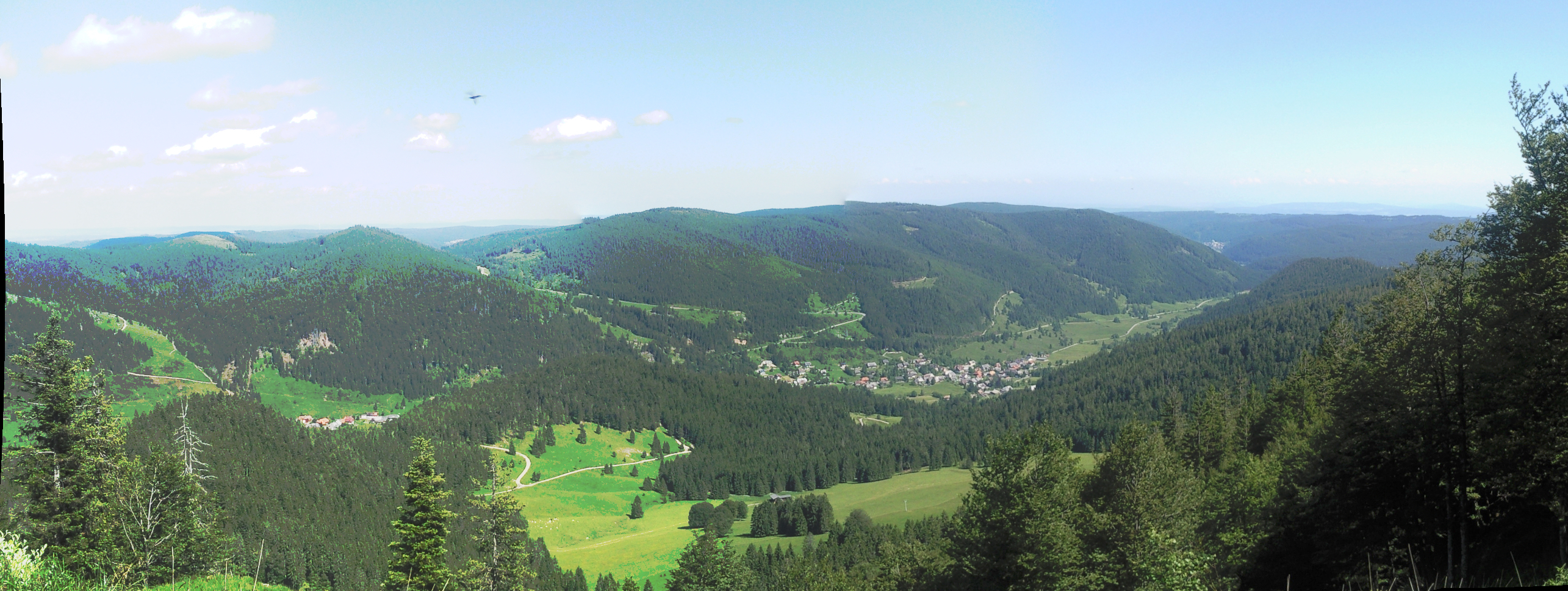
- View from Spießhorn eastward into Menzenschwander Alb valley

- Location of mouth

Location
- Country: Germany
- Location: Black Forest

Physical characteristics
- Source
  - location: Menzenschwander Alb
  - coordinates: 47°51′42″N 8°1′37″E
  - elevation: 1,347 m (4,419 ft)
- Mouth
  - location: Confluence with High Rhine at Albbruck
  - coordinates: 47°35′3″N 8°7′43″E
  - elevation: 308 m (1,010 ft)
- Length: 43.6 km (27.1 mi)
- Basin size: 243 km^{2} (94 sq mi)

Basin features
- Progression: Rhine→ North Sea
- Tributaries
  - right: Ibach, Höllbach

The Alb (also: Hauensteiner Alb) is a river in the southern Black Forest, Baden-Württemberg, Germany. It arises from two headwaters, the Menzenschwander Alb and Bernauer Alb, and flows in a southerly direction. It ends after 43.6 kilometres (27.1 mi) (including Menzenschwander Alb) at a confluence with the High Rhine at Albbruck.

== Etymology ==
The name Alb is possibly derived from a Proto-Indo-European word *albhos meaning "white" or perhaps "river".

== Headwaters ==
The headwaters of the Menzenschwander Alb lie on the southern slope of the Feldberg mountain range in the Landkreis of Breisgau-Hochschwarzwald. The Bernauer Alb rises on the southern slope of the Herzogenhorn. The Menzenschwander Alb is about 12 kilometres (7 mi) long and flows south-east past Menzenschwand. The Bernauer Alb is about 11 kilometres (7 mi) long; it also flows south-east, past Bernau. The confluence of the two headwaters is at Glashofsäge, about 4 kilometres (2.5 mi) from Sankt Blasien.

The valleys of both headwaters were widened by glaciers during the ice age. Both are about 900 metres (3,000 ft) high and dominated by grassland. The Bernau valley is a broad basin, characterized by moraines, marshy valleys, ravines, and Roche moutonnées. The hamlets and isolated farms that make up the valley lie some distance above the frost-prone valley floor.

The glacial features in the Menzenschwand valley are even more striking. The Menzenschwander Kluse is a well-known terminal moraine. Below the Kluse, the Menzenschwand Alb plunges with several waterfalls through a small ravine to a basin created by the former Krunkelbach valley glacier.

== Middle reaches ==
The area occupied by the municipality of Sankt Blasien's area is dominated by the classicist dome of Sankt Blasien's Cathedral. Below the village centre, the Alb form a waterfall, locally known as Wasserfall am Tusculum, after the Roman town of Tusculum. The Alb, like most rivers in this part of the Black Forest, then changes its course by about 60 degrees, towards the south. This is thought to be caused by tectonic movements of the Earth's crust, which have increased the gradient to the High Rhine. The only valley that continues in a south-eastern direction is about 200 metres (660 ft) higher, in the saddle near Häusern. During the ice age, the Alb glacier was about 300 metres (980 ft) high in this area, and its meltwater overflowed the Häusern saddle, into the Schwarza valley.

Below this bend, the Alb water is collected in a reservoir, the Alb Basin. Its average surface area is 18 hectares (44 acres); it is impounded by a dam of about 80 metres (260 ft) in length. Most of the water is piped to the Schwarzabruck reservoir. Both reservoirs are owned by the Schluchseewerk AG.

The Alb then flows through a 200-to-400-metre (660 to 1,310 ft) wide valley, lined by meadows, which contains the villages of Schlageter and Immeneich. The valley is no longer bordered by narrow, wooded ridges, but instead by the undulating Hotzenwald plateau in the municipalities of Dachsberg und Höchenschwand. The plateau is indented by bogs and rocky hilltops.

During the Würm ice age, the Alb glacier ended at the point where we now find the village of Niedermühle. With a length of 27 kilometres (17 mi), the Alb glacier was the longest in the Black Forest. Downstream of Niedermühle, the valley is very narrow, leaving no room for settlements.

== Alb Gorge ==
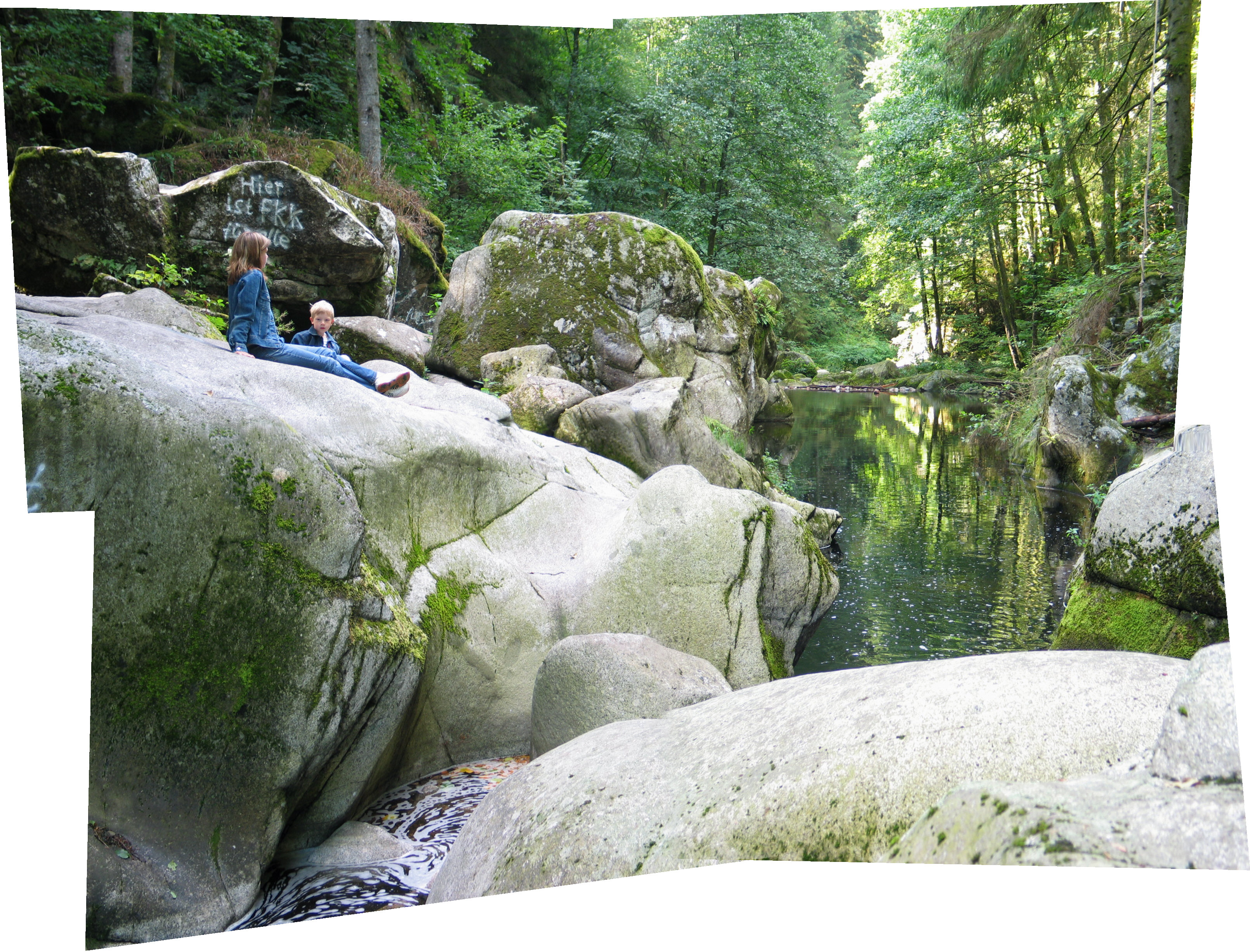
Teufelsküche, a giant's kettle in the Alb valley

The slope of the Alps increased greatly in the ravines and the river forces its way through the more canyon-like passages and blocked sections known as the Teufelsküche ("Devil's Kitchen"). The Ibach and Höllbach join from the right, each emerging from its own narrow gorge. The Höllbach has two waterfalls in this area. Because the gorge is so narrow, the road is up to 80 metres (260 ft) higher, on the left bank. On a wider spot in the valley, is the saw mill Tiefenstein and two tributaries, Schildbach and Steinbach. Halfway up the slope, there are granite quarries and the ruins of two castles.

The narrowest and most dangerous passage begins 4 kilometres (2.5 mi) downstream of Tiefenstein. Long ago, the Alb followed a different course and flowed to Hauenstein through the valley now occupied by the Mühlbach. This route was blocked by glacial deposits during an earlier ice age, forcing the Alb to find a new route to the Rhine. Since then, the "new" gorge cuts through the granite rock. This section cannot be travelled without special equipment, even though the water flow is usually low, because most of the water has been diverted. It there is sufficient water, canoeing is possible, although this is considered the most difficult stretch of whitewater in Germany. In this section the road runs up to 100 metres (330 ft) above the river and passes through five short tunnels drilled through the cliffs, giving it the nickname "Axenstraße of the Black Forest". From the hamlet Hohenfels, the road descends to the valley floor at Albbruck, where the Alb flows into the High Rhine.

== Gallery ==
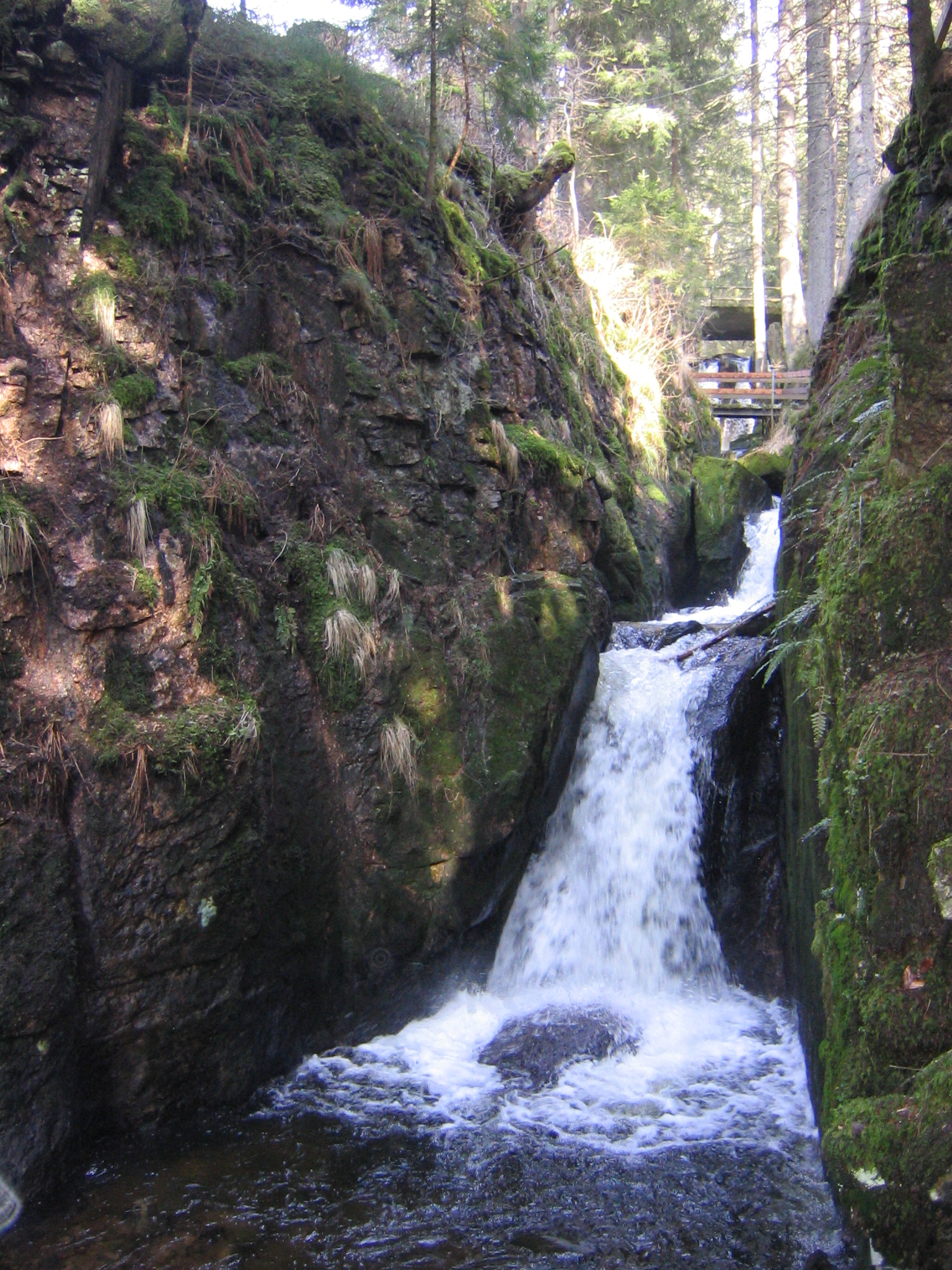
Waterfalls in the gorge of Menzenschwander Alb

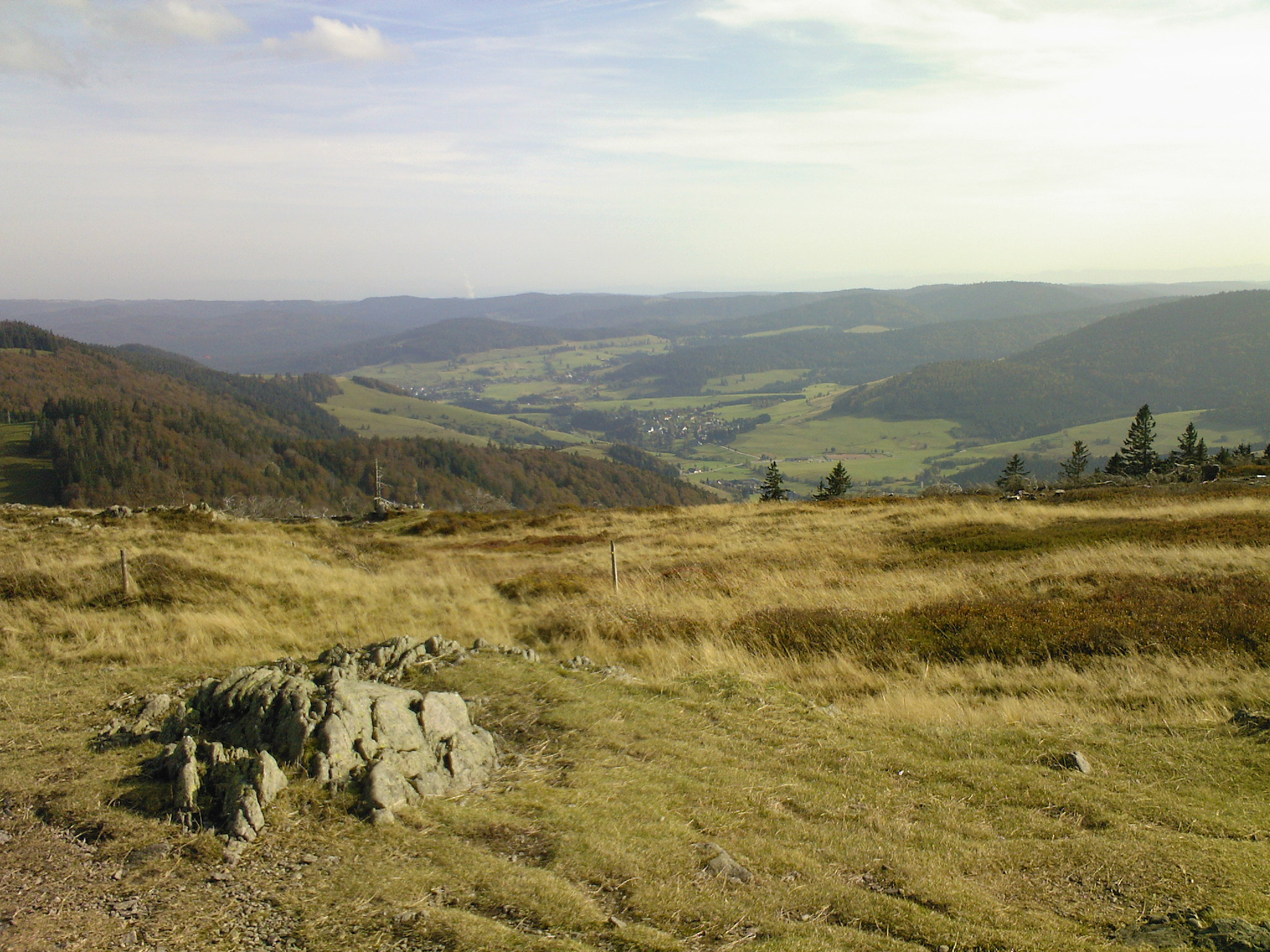
The valley north of Bernauer Alb

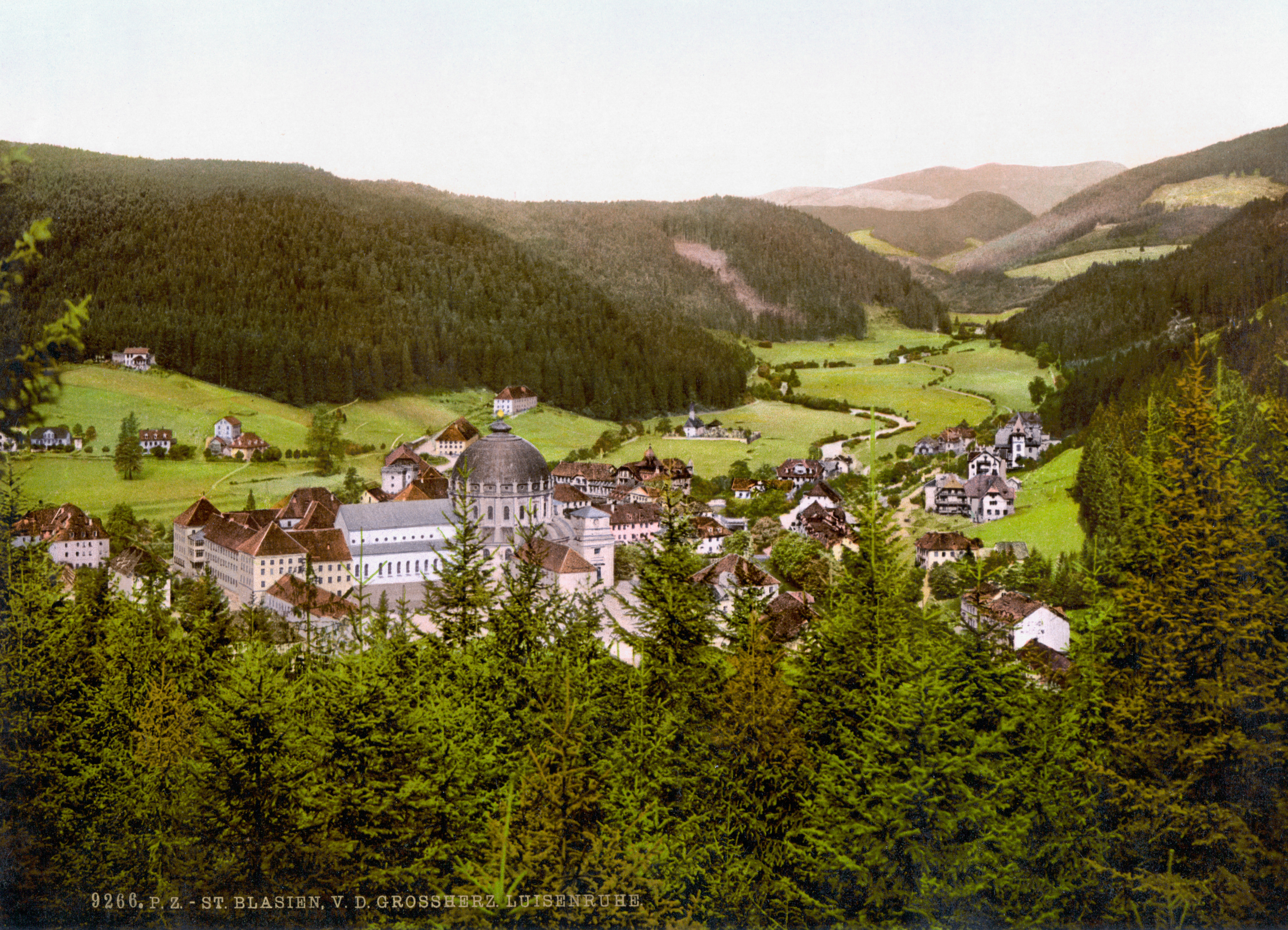
St Blaise and the upper Alb valley in 1900

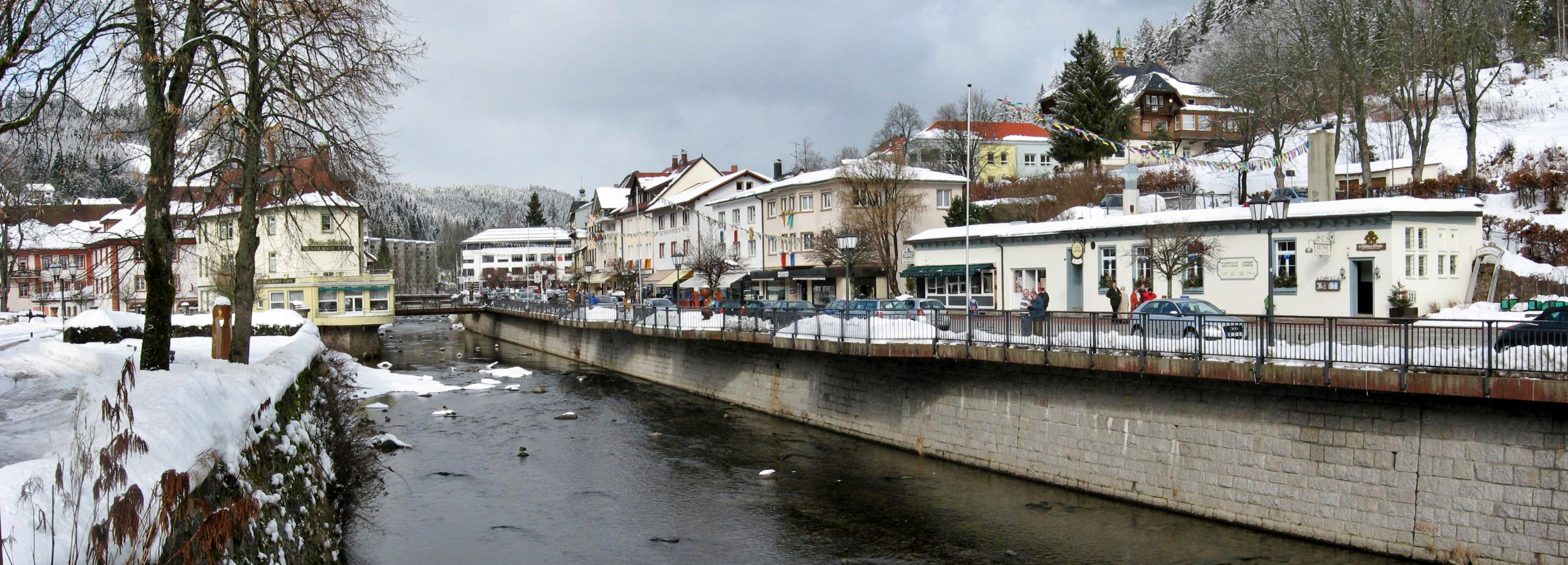
The Alb in St. Blasien

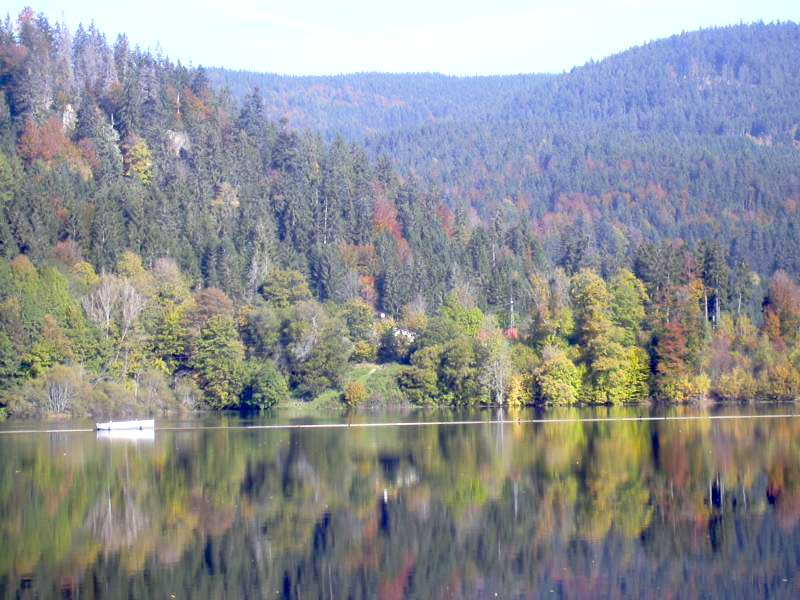
The Albbecken below St. Blasien

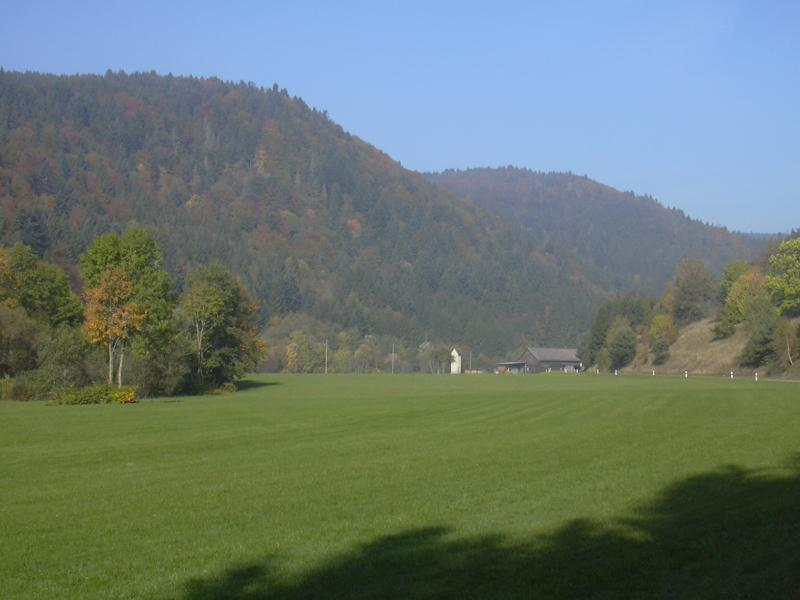
The Alb valley above the gorge at Niedermühle

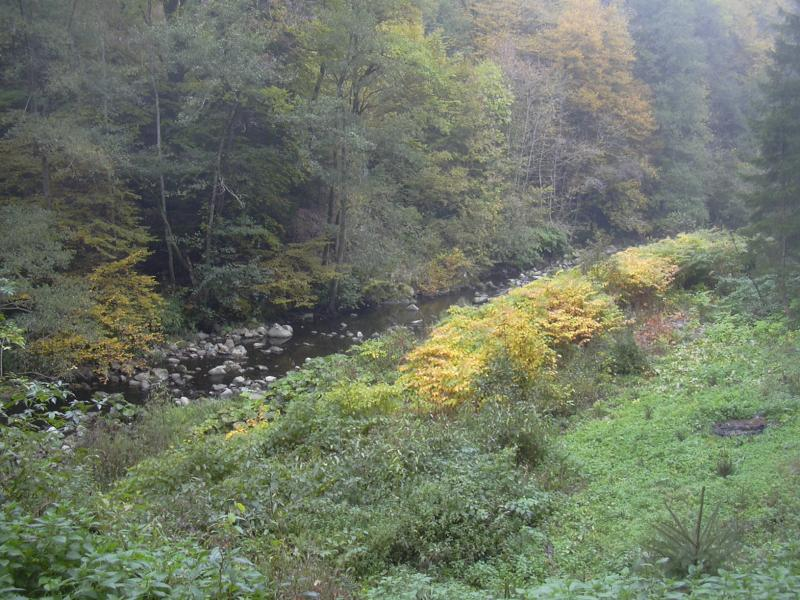
Widening of the Alb gorge at Tiefenstein

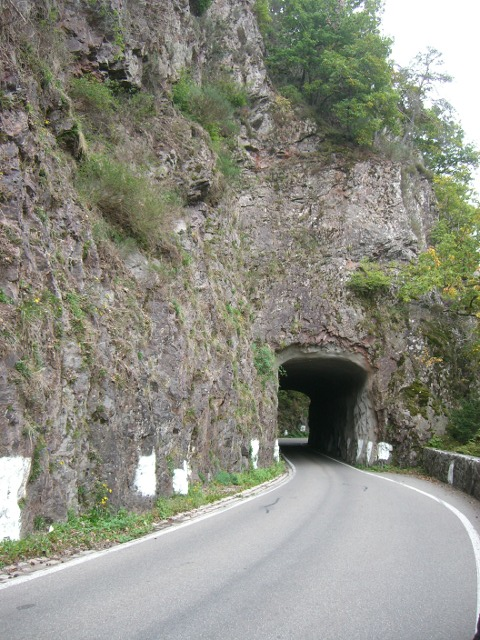
One of the five tunnels in the upper canyon wall

== See also ==
- Alb (Northern Black Forest)
- List of rivers of Baden-Württemberg
