= Liesing (Mur) =

River in Austria

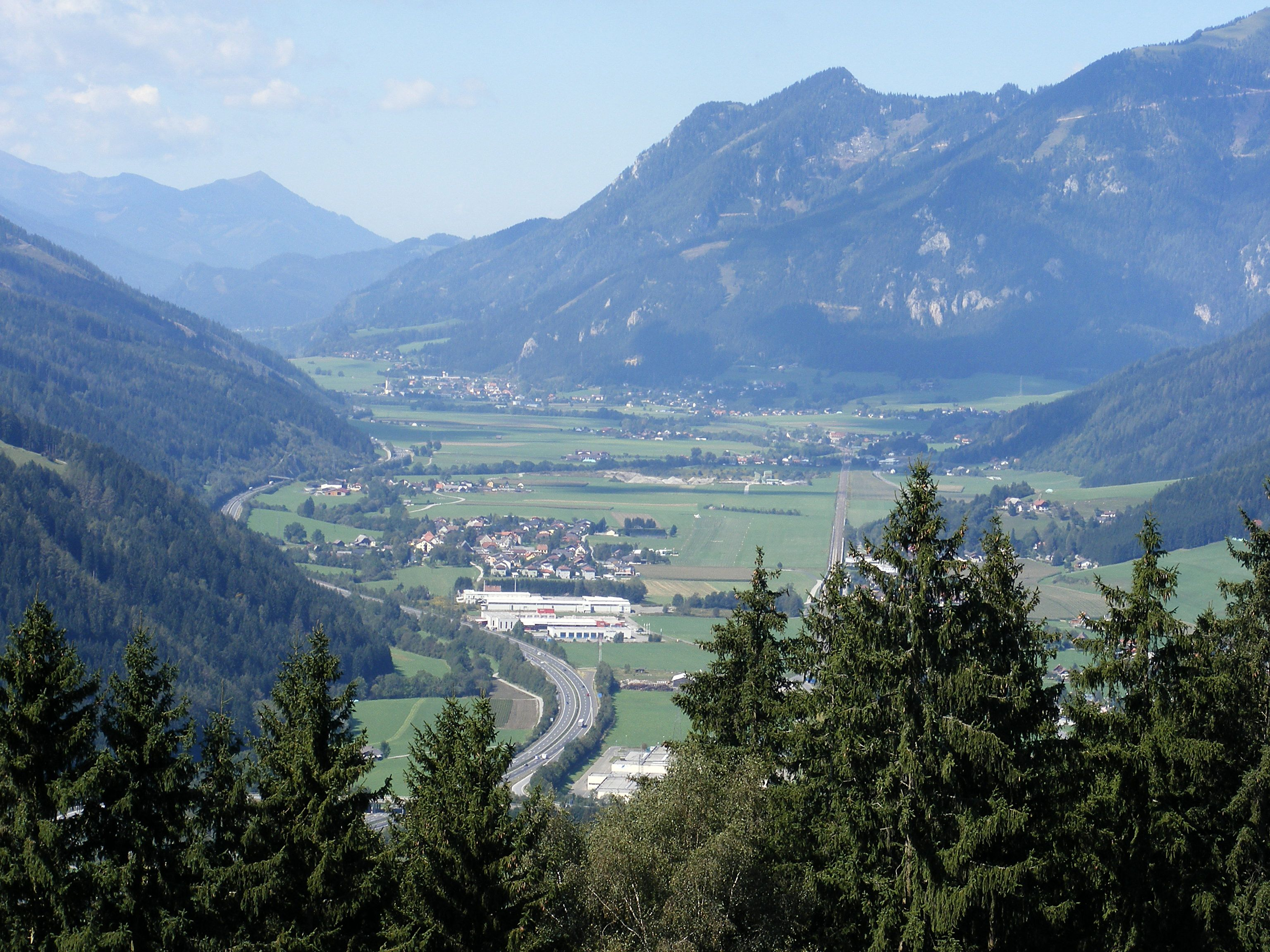

Location
- Country: Austria
- Region: Upper Styria

Physical characteristics
- Mouth: Mur
  - coordinates: 47°20′02″N 15°01′17″E
- Length: 38.7 km (24.0 mi)

The Liesing, sometimes also called the Liesingbach, is a 38.7-kilometre-long (24.0 mi) river in the Leoben District of Upper Styria in central Austria. It is a left tributary of the Mur.

== See also ==
- Enns (river)
- List of rivers of Austria
