= Schartau =

Schartau is a surname. Notable people with the surname include:

- Frans-Albert Schartau (1877–1943), Swedish sport shooter
- Henric Schartau (1757–1825), Swedish Lutheran pietistic clergyman
