= Riss (river) =

River in Germany

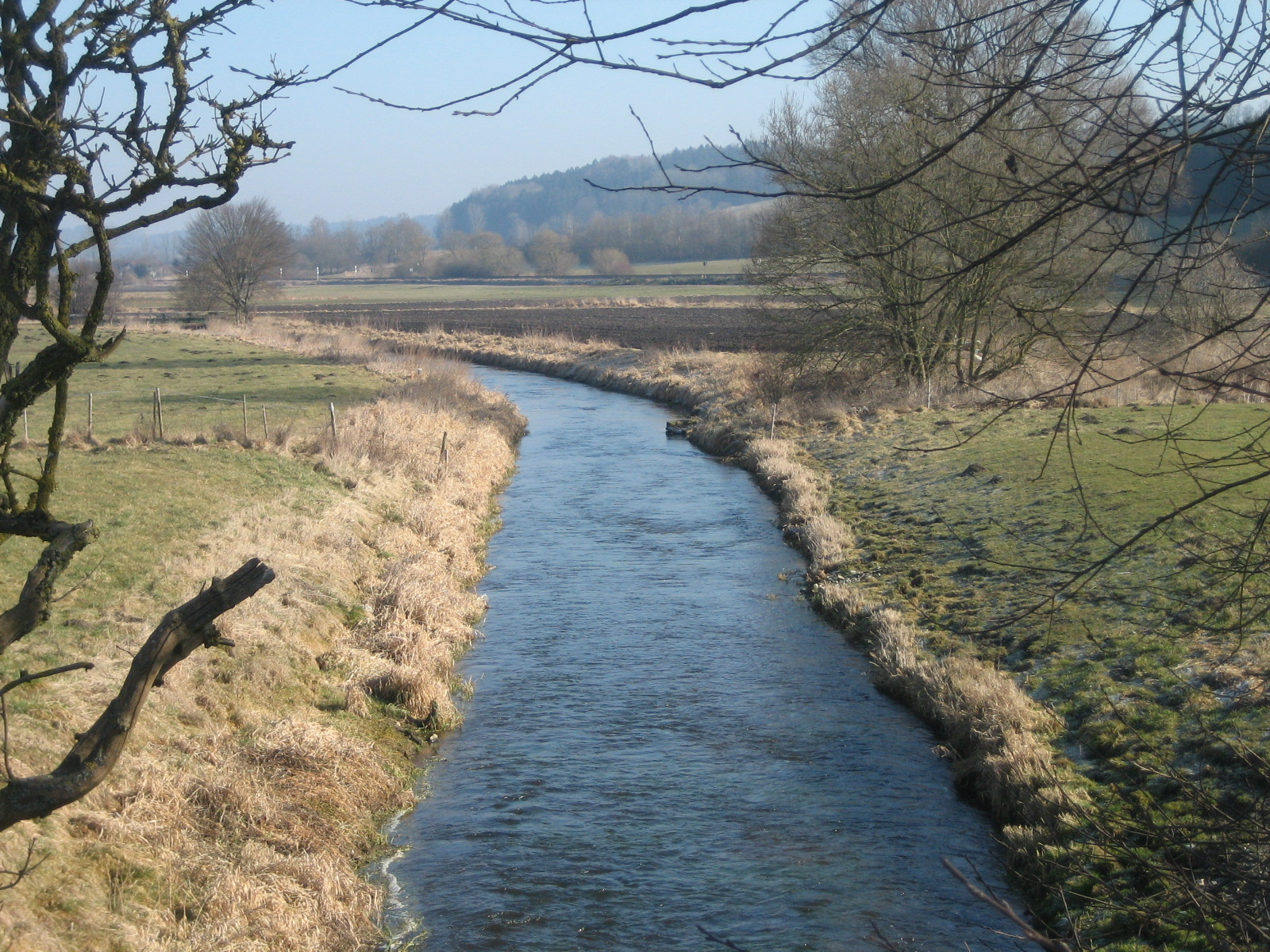

Location
- Country: Germany
- State: Baden-Württemberg

Physical characteristics
- Source
  - location: Upper Swabia
  - coordinates: 47°57′32″N 9°43′44″E
- Mouth
  - location: Danube
  - coordinates: 48°17′8″N 9°49′6″E
- Length: 49.9 km (31.0 mi)
- Basin size: 417 km^{2} (161 sq mi)

Basin features
- Progression: Danube→ Black Sea

The Riss (German: Riß, pronounced [ʁɪs]) is a small river in Baden-Württemberg, south-western Germany, right tributary of the Danube. Its source is in Upper Swabia, between Bad Waldsee and Bad Schussenried. It flows north, through the town of Biberach an der Riss. It then flows into the Danube one mile north of Rißtissen between Ehingen and Erbach, approximately 20 km upstream from Ulm. Its total length is approximately 50 km.

The Riss gave its name to the Riss glaciation, an ice age.

== See also ==
- List of rivers of Baden-Württemberg
