= Seven Sealands =

Jurisdictional regions in medieval Frisia

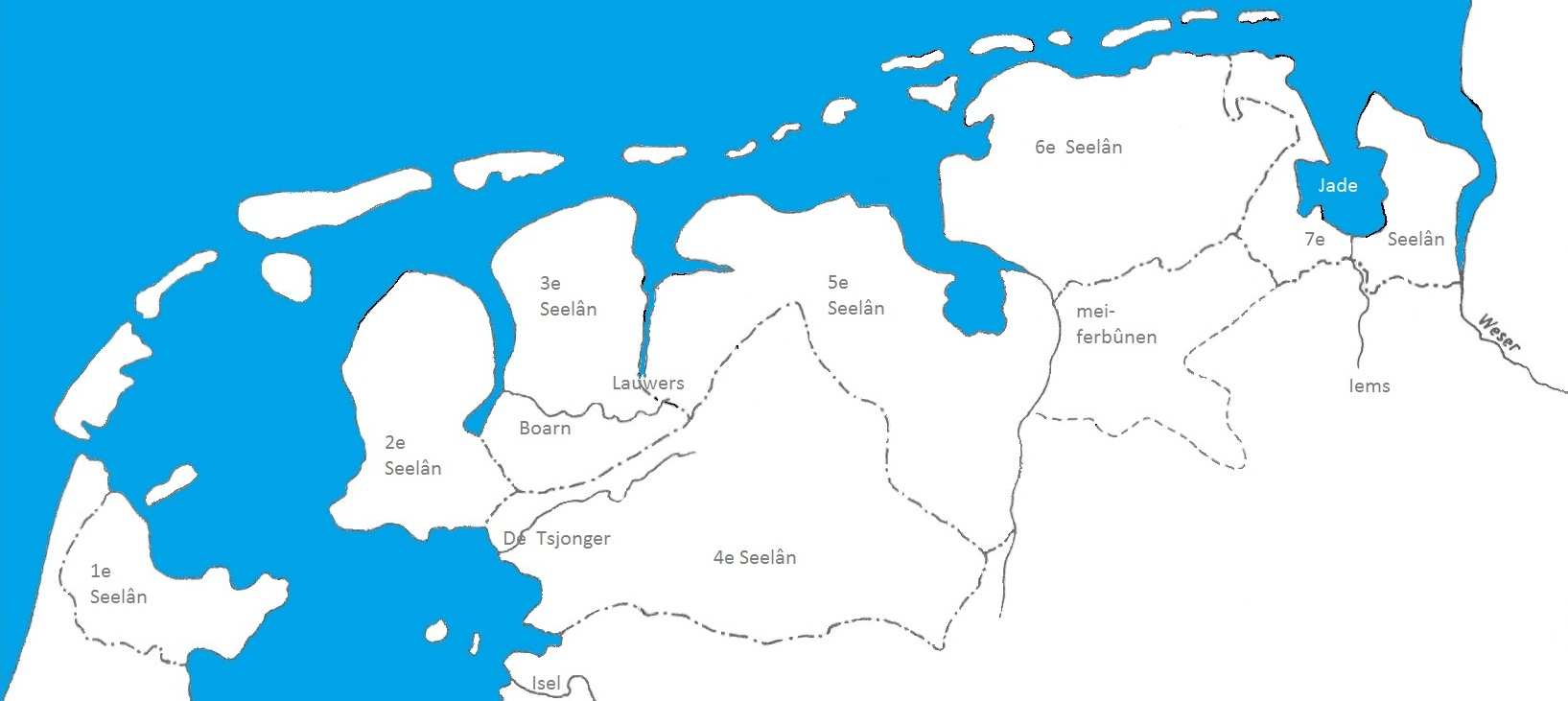
Map of the Seven Sealands within Frisia as defined around 1417

In Frisian historiography, the Seven Sealands (Old Frisian: Saun Selanden; (Note: The pronunciation sawen or saun ('seven') is found west of the Lauwers river whereas sigun is found to the east of it. The term seland is also attested as selond and zeland. While other forms of these words in both dialects are attested, this article uses the most-commonly used spelling in the Statutes of Magnus provided by Nijdam, Hallebeek & de Jong (2023), pp. 175–181.) West Frisian: Sân Seelannen) were jurisdictional regions in medieval Frisia. An outgrowth of the origin myths of the Frisians, these divisions were used ideologically to refer to all of Frisia as early as the 14th century and became extremely popular by the following century. The term was used in legal documents and was the basis for several legal rights, including defense pacts and the right to a speedy trial under particular circumstances. The Seven Sealands later helped to define a united Frisian identity as being free and chosen by God.

== Mythological origins ==
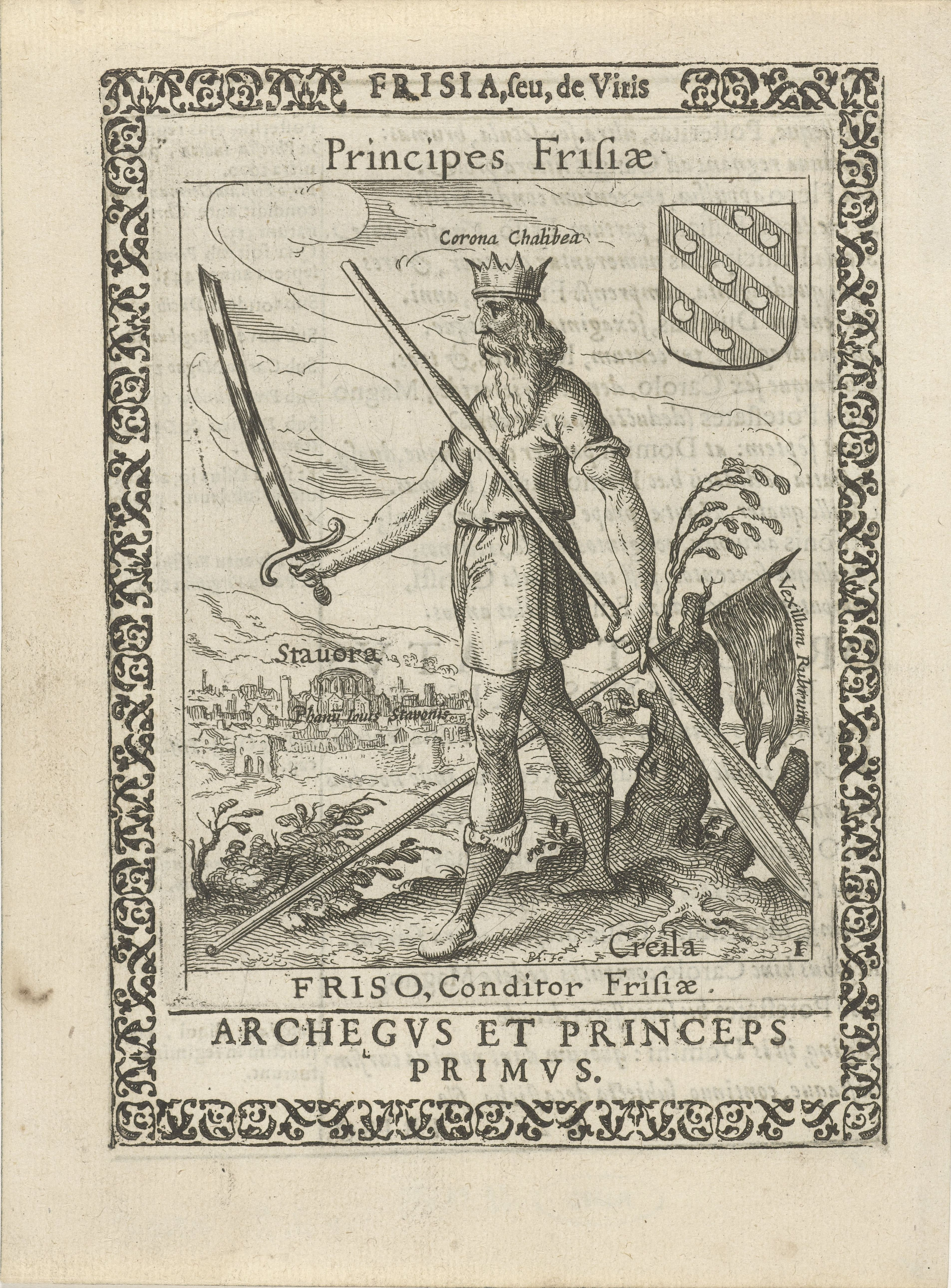
A print of Friso, the legendary founder of Frisia, by Pieter Feddes van Harlingen (c. 1619)

According to a medieval Frisian historiographical work, the Gesta-cycle, (Note: Also known as the Gesta Dei per Frisios, a later appellation applied by the Frisian historiography scholar E. H. Waterbolk, the Gesta-cycle is a collection of several documents: the Frisian-language Gesta Fresonum, the Middle Dutch–language derivative Gesta Frisiorum ('Deeds of the Frisians'), and the Historia Frisiae, a collection of Middle Dutch–language adaptions of the previous works in rhyming verse or derivations thereof.) after Thomas the Apostle traveled to Christianize India, God led three Christian brothers – Friso, Saxo, and Bruno – from their native home, called Fresia, (Note: Also called Benedicta Frisia ('Blessed Frisia').) in northern India to northern Europe. Upon their arrival, the lands they took were divided among them; Bruno was given Brunswick, Saxo was given Saxony, and Friso was given Frisia. Friso had eight children, one daughter and seven sons, and each of the seven sons ruled over one piece of Frisia, comprising the Seven Sealands. These lands stretched from Alkmaar in the modern-day Netherlands to Bremen in modern-day Germany.

The mythological origins of the Frisians are considered to be a peregrination myth, a kind of migratory founding myth common among several European peoples. The Frisian version may have been adapted from Saxon sources and show similarities to the Anglo-Saxon origin myth as well. Although the Gesta offers one example of the origin myth, there are other versions, though all agree that there were three foundational people or groups who sailed over the sea from an island home to their new European homeland. The true origin of the Seven Sealands is unknown but the concept was extremely widespread during the 15th century.

== Political and legal usage ==
The Seven Sealands were used as an ideological reference to all of Frisia as early as the 14th century in the Old Frisian law text known as the Statutes of Upstalsboom, instituted on 18 September 1323. Around 1417, A Treatise on the Seven Sealands describes the Seven Sealands as a symbolically unified area from West Frisia to around the Weser river in modern-day northwest Germany. In part of the Gerda, this is framed to be from West Frisia west of the Vlie to Dithmarschen far east of the Weser river. The idea of the Seven Sealands helped to define Frisian identity in the late Middle Ages as "elect, Christian, and free".

=== Statutes of Magnus ===
Dated to around the 12th century, the Statutes of Magnus (Old Frisian: Dae Kerren deer Magnus Kaes thoe Roem, lit. 'The Statutes Which Magnus Formulated in Rome') – also known as the Saga of Magnus – tell the story of the Frisian effort to liberate Rome after Pope Leo III was mutilated and the rewards Charlemagne bestowed on the Frisians under their leader, Magnus. The sixth statute affords Frisians particular legal protections under their respective sealand; that is, each sealand was allowed their own legal system and legal rights. It allowed priests to have the legal authority to judge, but only if two laymen were also judges. The term "Seven Sealands" is invoked here as Frisians could not be deployed outside their territory for war according to another previous agreement.

=== Statutes of Upstalsboom ===
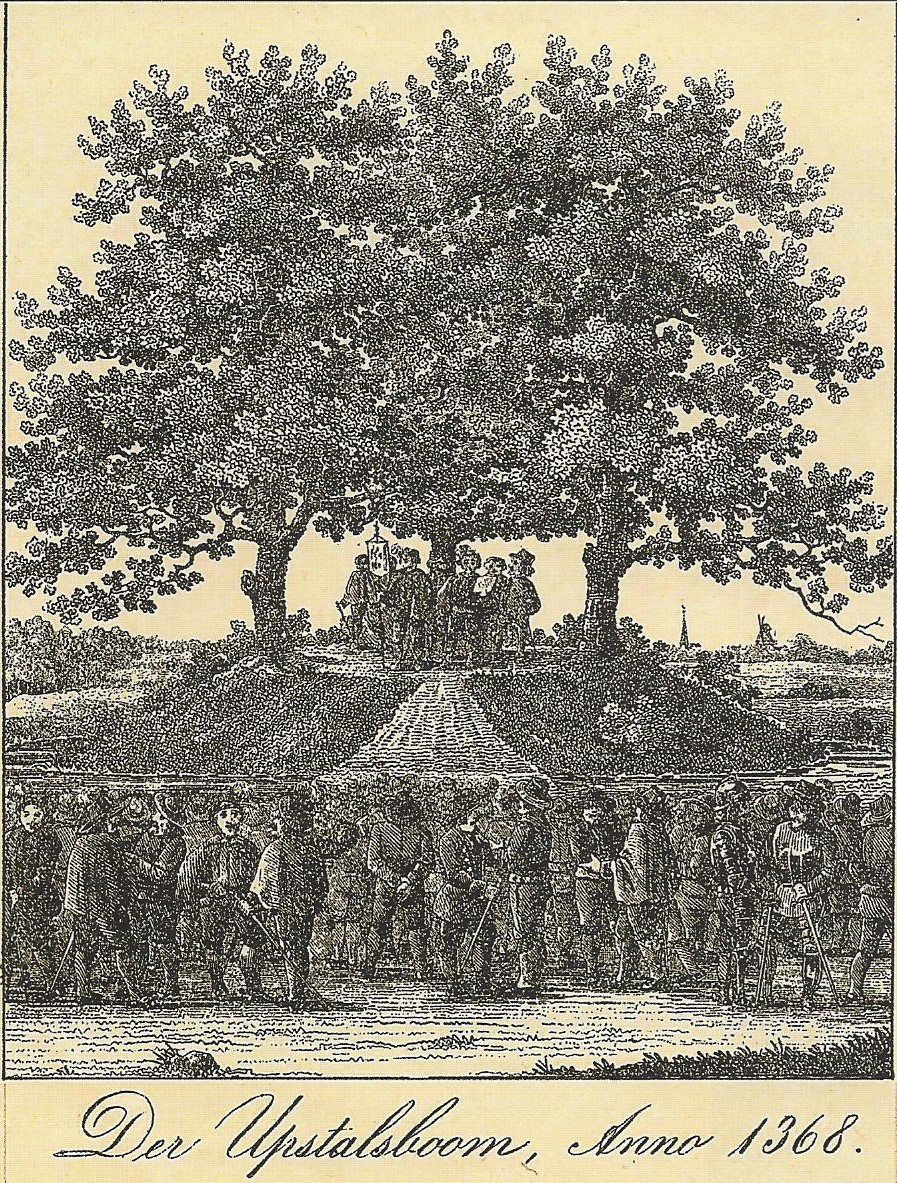
A 19th-century illustration of the 1368 meeting at the Upstalsboom

The Statutes of Upstalsboom (Da Wilkerren fan Opstallisbame) were legal agreements between the Seven Sealands. Its first clause is a defense pact; an attack "intend[ing] to damage or bring shame" to one sealand would cause the other six to come to its immediate defense. The sixth clause provides an additional eighty-mark fine for killing a man outside of his own sealand split between the judges and the recipient; that is, if a man is killed in a sealand other than his own, the fine is eighty additional marks on the original payment with half being given to the judge. The following clause provides that if other sealands are invoked to quell anyone "disobedient to the judges in his own district", the fine is one hundred marks to each sealand that answers the call. Finally, the twenty-third clause stipulates a legal obligation that if someone brings a legal complaint from one sealand to another, irrespective of severity, he may have it "dealt with by judges within three days". If it is not, the gretman (Note: This was a Frisian legal position similar to a magistrate or president of the court.) must allow the person bringing the complaint to stay there at the gretman's expense until the case is settled.

=== A Treatise on the Seven Sealands ===
A Treatise on the Seven Sealands (Een Tractaet fan da Saun Zelanden) (Note: From its incipit: 'Here Begins a Short Treatise on the Seven Sealands of Which the Whole of Frisia, Including its Appurtenances and Islands, Consists' (Hyr begint een cleen tractaet fan da Saun Zelanden des gansen landis fan Freesland mei syn tobiheer ende eylanden)) describes the general area ascribed to each of the Seven Sealands around 1417, though the surviving document appears to be based on an earlier work. The treatise was used in the ratification of Frisian privileges by Emperor Sigismund in 1417 and includes traditionally Saxon territory that was seen as likely to come under Frisian control, including Drenthe and parts of Overijssel.

The document defines each sealand, its range, its main cities, and reflect on their position in the Holy Roman Empire and the Church. The sealands according to this document are as follows:

Sealand	Territorial description	Other information
First Sealand	West Frisia (Hoorn, Enkhuizen, Medemblik, "et cetera")	Subjugated by the Count of Holland
Second Sealand	From Stavoren to Leeuwarden (Westergoa, Doniawerstal, and Wymbritseradiel "with all their territories")	Still free territory of the Holy Roman Empire, but suffering severely after sustained attacks by the Count of Holland
Third Sealand	Eastergoa (Smallingerland, Boornego, Haudmare, Haskerland, the Lang Wouden, Rauwerderhem, Achtkarspelen, and Kollumerland)	Still free territory of the Holy Roman Empire, but suffering severely after sustained attacks by the Count of Holland
Fourth Sealand	Stellingwerf, Schoterwerf, Kuinderzijl, Giethoorn, Vollenhove, Steenwijk, and all of Drenthe	Subjugated by the Bishop of Utrecht, except Stellingwerf and Schoterwerf which are still free territory
Fifth Sealand	Langewold, Vredewold, Humsterland, Middag, Hunsingo, Fivelgo, Groningen, Oldambt, Rheiderland, Westerwolde including "all lands that surround [Westerwolde] between the river Ems and Westphalia"	Mostly free with parts subjugated by Keno of Brokmerland and "count Urlich" and others "are subordinate to the people of the city of Groningen"
Sixth Sealand	Emden, "all of Emderland", Brokmerland, Auricherland, Astringen, Harlingerland, and Norderland "with all its appurtenances"	Subjugated by Keno of Brokmerland, who plundered it and killed its priests; described as "this noble Sealand" and "the richest and fertile"
Seventh Sealand	Rüstringen, Wangerland, Butjadingen, Overledingerland, Moormerland, Lengen, Saterland, Stadland (Hadeln and Wigmodia), and Dithmarschen	Rüstringen, Wangerland, and Butjadingen subordinated to Keno's nephew, Sibolt Overledingerland, Moormerland, and Lengen subjugated by Keno and given to Focko Ukena; Saterland pays tribute to the Bishop of Münster; Stadland subjugated by the Bishop of Bremen; Dithmarschen still free territory

== See also ==
- Brokmerbrief – 13th-century East Frisian law code
- Frisian freedom – Absence of feudalism in medieval Frisia
- Frisian Kingdom
- Mythology of the Low Countries
- Pier Gerlofs Donia – Frisian warrior, pirate, and rebel (1480–1520)
- Potestaat of Friesland – Legendary leader of medieval Frisia
