= Eastergoa =

Historical region in Friesland

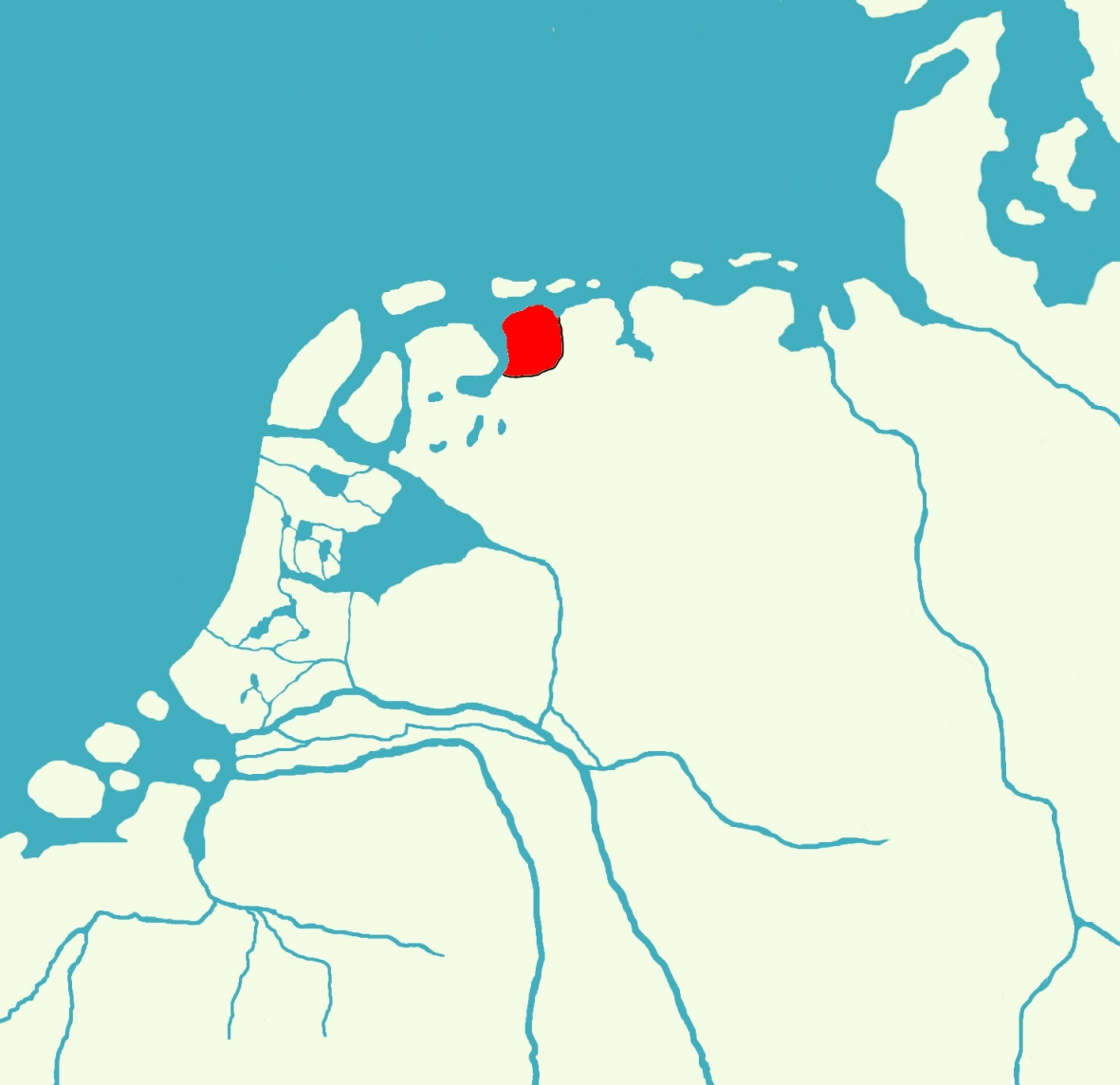
Eastergoa in the Frankish realm (in the Middle Ages

The flag of Eastergoa.

Eastergoa (also Ostergau, Ostergo, or Oostergo) was one of the Seven Sealands and one of the three Gaue within what is today the province of Friesland in the Netherlands.

== Area ==
On its west side Eastergoa was bordered by the Middelsee with Westergoa on the other side of the water. To the south the Alde Leppedyk and the Boarn were the border with Bornegoa, and later with Sânwâlden (Dutch: Zeuvenwoolden). To the east it was bordered by the Lauwers, the Lauwerzee and the Westerkwartier of the Ommelanden (the western portion of the today's province of Groningen).

== 1200 ==
The whole of this area belonged to Wininge and Achtkarspelen, which was at that point still a part of Eastergoa. Around 1200 Wininge comprised Dantumadeel, Dongeradeel and Ferwerderadeel (West Frisian: Dantumadiel, Dongeradiel and Ferwerderadiel) in the north and Idaarderadeel, Leeuwarderadeel and Tietjerksteradeel in the south (West Frisian: Idaarderadiel, Ljouwerteradiel and Tytsjerksteradiel). Around 1250 it was split into two parts called the Noardlike njoggen ('northern nine') and the Sudlike njoggen ('southern nine').

== 1500 ==
Around 1500 Eastergoa was further divided into two cities and eleven grietenijen (West Frisian: gritenijen; municipalities).

The eleven grietenijen of Eastergoa		
Number	Dutch name	West Frisian name
1	Leeuwarderadeel	Ljouwerteradiel
2	Ferwerderadeel	Ferwerderadiel
3	Westdongeradeel	West-Dongeradiel
4	Oostdongeradeel	East-Dongeradiel
5	Kollumerland	Kollumerlân
6	Achtkarspelen	
7	Dantumadeel	Dantumadiel
8	Tietjerksteradeel	Tytsjerksteradiel
9	Smallingerland	Smellingerlân
10	Idaarderadeel	Idaarderadiel
11	Rauwerderhem	Raerderhim
The two cities
Letter	Dutch name	West Frisian name
Lw	Leeuwarden	Ljouwert; Stadsfries: Liwwadden
D	Dokkum	

== See also ==
- Albdag
