= Codex Roorda =

Frisian manuscript

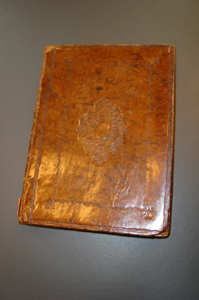

The Codex Roorda is a Frisian manuscript dating from the Middle Ages.

The Codex Roorda is a medieval manuscript with Latin and Old Frisian legal texts. There are different views on dating. This varies from 1480 to 1504. The Codex Roorda is important because it describes the medieval Frisian law that applied to the establishment of the central authority in Friesland. In addition, it is linguistically important because it is partly set up in Old Frisian. The Codex Roorda is owned by and is kept at Tresoar in Leeuwarden.

The origin of Codex Roorda is not clear. Probably they started making the book in 1480. Briquet dated the book on the basis of watermarks on 1495. Renewed paper research has now led to a date around 1504. Who has put the book together is unclear. The first owner was Karel van Roorda, mid-17th century grietman van Idaarderadeel and (also) member of the Provincial Executive. Because of his membership of a noble Frisian mainstream family, it is possible, but not certain, that the code was already family ownership for a century and a half.

Karel van Roorda († 1670) has given (or sold) the codex to Simon Abbes Gabbema (1628 - 1688), Landshistorial writer of the province of Friesland. After the establishment of the central authority by Duke Albrecht of Saxony in 1498, the centuries of Frisian Freedom had come to an end, a period in which the Frisians did not recognize any authority, liege or countryman except the emperor. Until that time they were free to organize their own jurisprudence and based this on age-old starting points. It should be clear that a historian like Gabbema had more in the 17th century than a grietman like Van Roorda. There is a gap in the history of the Codex Roorda from the moment Gabbema held it until the next owner, Petrus Wierdsma (1729-1811). It is possible that Rev. Johannes van der Waeijen, the successor of Gabbema, has taken over the book as part of Gabbema's professional legacy. According to the Leeuwarden city historian Wopke Eekhoff in a lecture for the Frisian Society in 1854, it is unlikely that Petrus Wierdsma inherited the book: his father was a doctor and Peter was a notary / lawyer. Eekhoff also knows that Peter Wierdsma has taken books and codices from the legacy of Werumeus, Halsema, Heringa and others, but whether the Codex Roorda was in between is not known.

Petrus Wierdsma studied and published about the old Frisian laws, and it is certain that he used the Codex Roorda, which he translated and compared with the legal texts from the codices Dousa and Emmius.

After his death, the widow and son of Wierdsma sold the most important part of his library in an auction. They still kept manuscripts, such as the Codex Roorda. In 1858 these were also sold. The Codex Roorda came into the possession of the German Germanist, lawyer and professor Karl Freiherr von Richthofen.
