= Emsigerland =

Historical region of East Frisia

- Medieval sealand of Frisia
- 13th century–1464
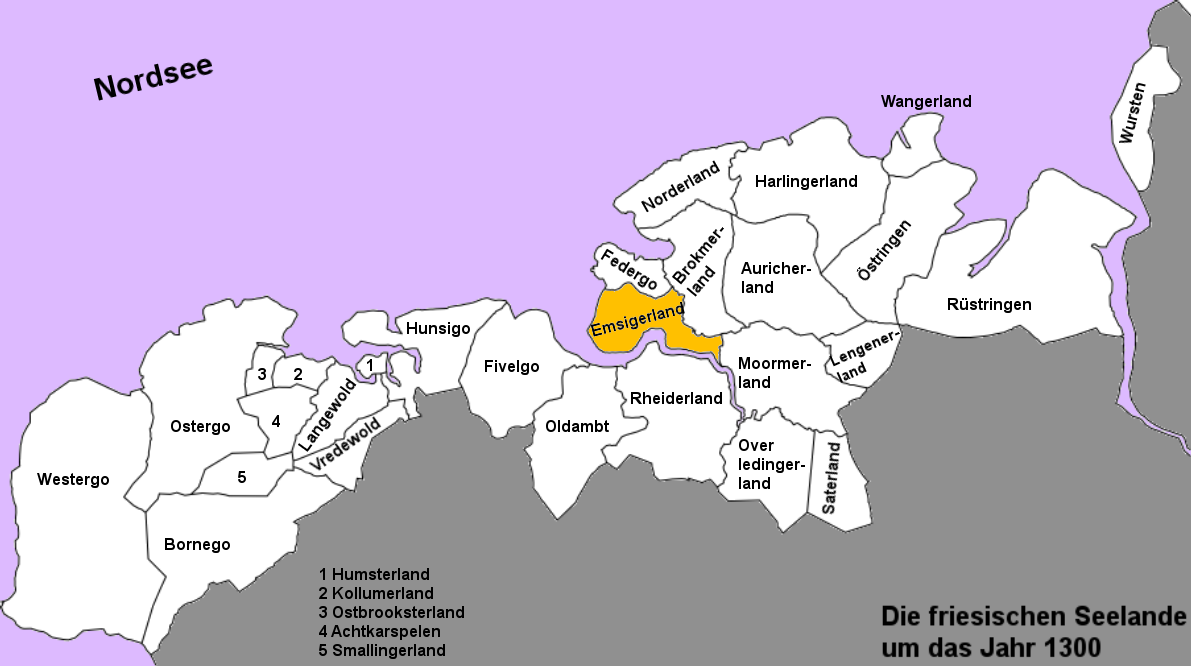
- Emsigerland (yellow), within the Seven Sealands (white) around 1300
- Capital: Emden
- History
  - Established: 13th century
  - Disestablished: 1464
Preceded by	Succeeded by
Emsgau	County of East Frisia
- Today part of: Germany

The Emsigerland, or Emderland was a historic region on the western edge of East Frisia by the Wadden Sea, which covered a wide area around the town of Emden. The Emsigerland borders in the north on the Federgau, in the northeast on the Brokmerland in the east on the Moormerland and in the south on the Rheiderland.

The Emsigerland was based on a historic territorial parish (Landesgemeinde), the Emsgau, and formed its economic centre. Unlike the rest of East Frisia, no system of chieftains was established here; the lands of the Emsgo including the Emsigerland remained autonomous. That changed in 1379, when the region passed into the possession of the tom Broks, whose inheritance then passed to the Cirksena.
