= Overledingerland =

Historical region of East Frisia

- Medieval sealand of Frisia
- 13th century–1464
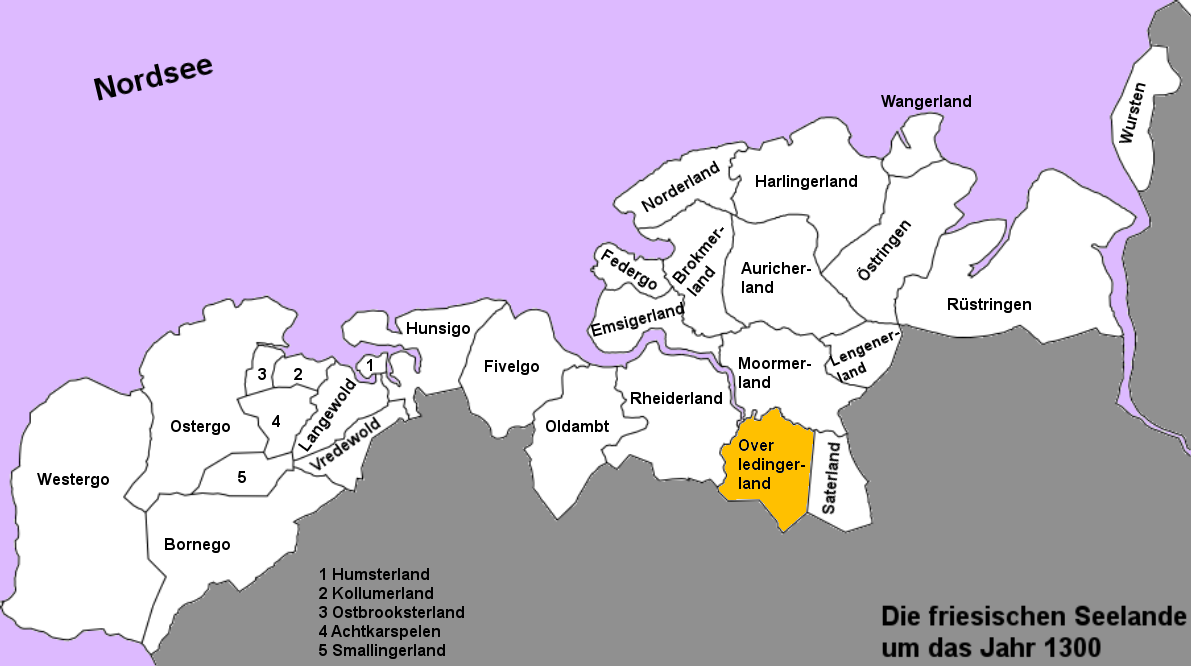
- Overledingerland (yellow), within the Seven Sealands (white) around 1300
- Capital: Backemoor
- History
  - Established: 13th century
  - Disestablished: 1464
Preceded by	Succeeded by
Emsgau	County of East Frisia
- Today part of: Germany

The Overledingerland (also Overledingen, Oberledingerland or Oberledingen) is a historical district in southern East Frisia and forms the southeastern part of the Leer district. The name means nothing other than "Land across the Leda", i.e. south of the Leda river. In the west, the Ems borders the region.

== History ==
The Overledingerland is one of the four historical districts on the mainland of today's Leer district. In the early Middle Ages it belonged to the Carolingian Emsgau, but after the foreign counts were expelled, it was able to establish itself as an independent Frisian regional community in the 13th century. In the south, some Saxon settlements also joined the cooperatively organized regional community. A classic feudal rule did not establish itself here, as in the rest of Frisia.

It was probably divided into regional quarters, each of which sent four representatives to the Council of Sixteen of the Overledingerland, whose main meeting place was probably Backemoor. Due to the economic conditions, however, the Overledingerland was not able to develop such a strong position as the Brokmerland, the Harlingerland or the Jeverland managed to do further north. During the time of Frisian freedom it became part of the Upstalsboom League.

The independence ended in the 15th century with the rule of the city of Hamburg and the East Frisian chieftains. A local central chieftaincy did not develop, only a few village chiefs were able to establish themselves. The district initially came under the rule of the tom Brok dynasty. After their decline, it fell to Focko Ukena and in his wake to the Cirksena. With the end of the chieftainship, the Overledingerland became part of the County of East Frisia in 1464.

== See also ==
- County of East Frisia
- Seven Sealands
- Frisian freedom
