= Albdag =

9th-century Frisian count

Albdag was a Frisian count from the 9th century.

Albdag controlled the gouw Oostergo in Central Friesland, which is the part of Friesland between Vlie and Lauwers. Friesland is now a province of the Netherlands He ruled in the name of Louis the German in the era when the Jutish Vikings dominated the Netherlands.

In 873, the Viking Rodulf Haraldsson made a predatory raid on Oostergo. The people organised themselves with the help of a Christian Norman to resist the invaders. Rodulf was killed in the battle. Herre Halbertsma has argued that the battle would have occurred around the church of Dokkum.
