= Grietenij =

Districts in what is now the Netherlands

A grietenij was a municipal district, a forerunner to the gemeente or municipality in Frisia, particularly in Friesland, and also in the city Groningen which are now a part of the Netherlands. After the Saxon occupation, from about 1498 until 1851, there were a total of 30 grietenijen in Friesland and 11 cities.

This system replaced the Frisian nobility system of the Frisian "hoofdelingen, stinsen en staten "(Frisian noblility, stone strongholds and surrounding estates).

A grietenij was an administrative district led by a grietman, who acted as both a judge and an administrator. Grietenij typically consisted of around 10 to 25 church parishes. The smallest territorial unit in both ecclesiastical and secular jurisdiction during that time was the parish, also known as "ga" in Old Frisian. The parish was an integral part of the synodal district and the secular grietenij, which were in turn part of the archdiakonate and the pagus (county), respectively. In Friesland, many grietenijen were named with the suffix "deel," which meant "part," such as Franekeradeel.

Land Ownership

Ownership of land in the grietenij was typically held by Frisian nobility (Friese adel, hoofdelingen), churches, or monasteries, and it was often leased out to tenant farmers. However, the proportion of land owned by different groups (nobility vs. common farmers) varied across different regions. According to tax records, around 35-40% of the fertile clay areas were owned by urban landowners and the hoofdelingen. In these areas, only a low percentage of farmers were actual owners-users, with the majority of farmers being tenant farmers. In contrast, the number of common farmers who owned and cultivated their own land increased as the land became poorer and further into the peat bog (e.g. southwest Friesland).

For example, in 1511, 15% of the land in Leeuwarderadeel (in the clay area) was both owned and used by the same person, while in AEngwirden (in the peat area) the number was 63% The political differences are even starker when only vote-bearing properties are considered. in 1640, 5% of the vote bearing properties in Leeuwarderadeel were both used and owned by the same person, while in AEngwirden (in the peat area) the number was 38%

These common, poorer, freehold farmers were known as husmannen (huisman, house-owning men), and their social and economic status varied greatly.

In the Municipality Law of 1851, the term grietenij was changed to gemeente (municipality), and the term grietman was changed to burgemeester (mayor). This resulted in consistent terms being used throughout the Netherlands.

== List of grietenijen ==
The list contains the names of the thirty grietenijen from the 18th century.

- Achtkarspelen
- Aengwirden
- Baarderadeel
- Barradeel
- Dantumadeel
- Doniawerstal
- Ferwerderadeel
- Franekeradeel
- Gaasterland
- Haskerland
- Hemelumer Oldephaert and Noordwolde (later: Hemelumer Oldeferd)
- Hennaarderadeel
- Het Bildt
- Idaarderadeel
- Kollumerland and Nieuwkruisland
- Leeuwarderadeel
- Lemsterland
- Menaldumadeel
- Oost-Dongeradeel
- Opsterland
- Rauwerderhem
- Schoterland
- Smallingerland
- Stellingwerf-Oosteinde (later: Ooststellingwerf)
- Stellingwerf-Westeinde (later: Weststellingwerf)
- Tietjerksteradeel
- Utingeradeel
- West-Dongeradeel
- Wonseradeel
- Wymbritseradeel
