= History of Frisia =

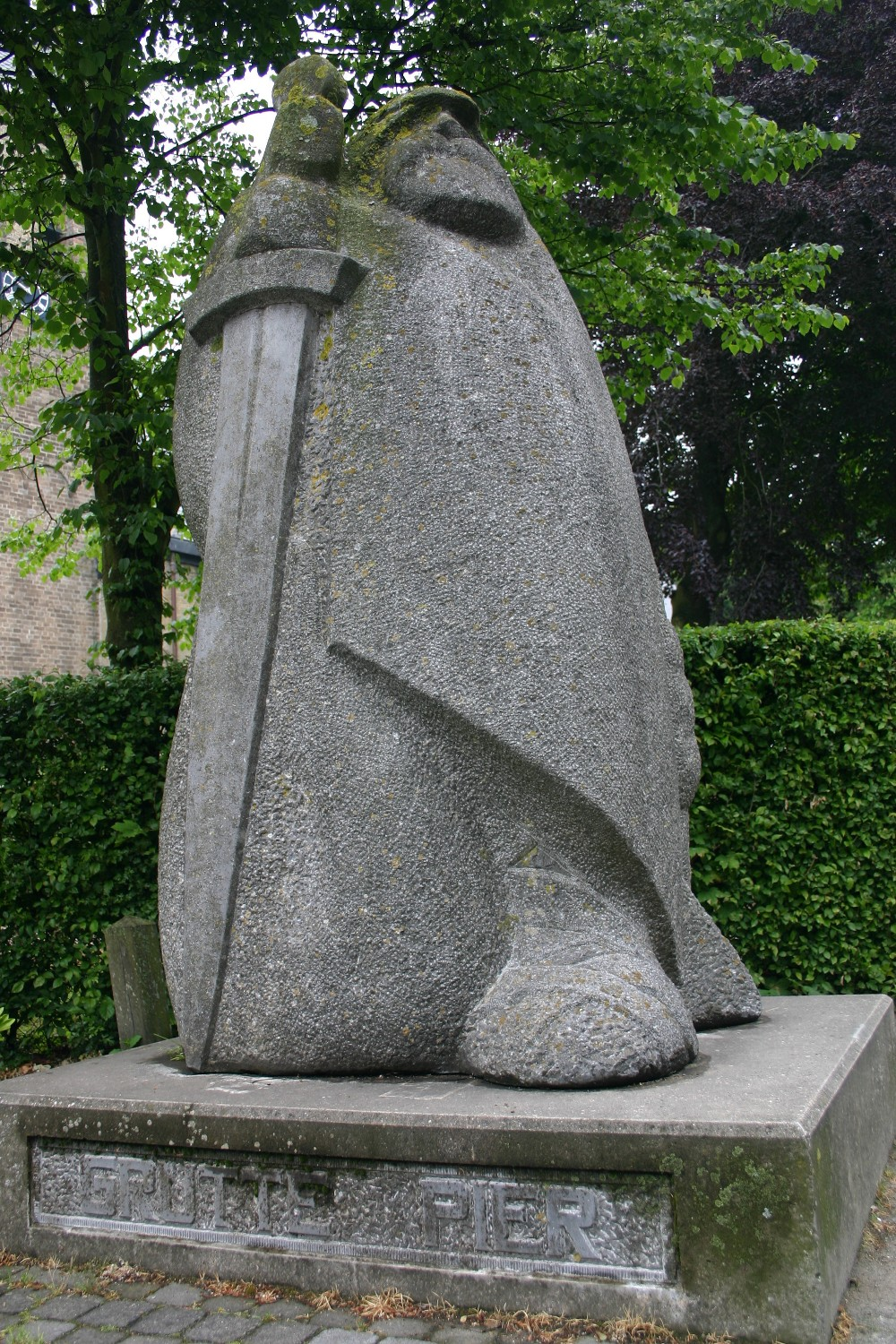
Statue of Pier Gerlofs Donia, the Frisian folk hero and freedom fighter

Frisia is a coastal region in the modern-day northeastern Netherlands and northwestern Germany. In the Iron Age, the ancestors of the modern Frisians first migrated south out of modern day Scandinavia to the south west where they began to settle along the coast. The archeological record goes all the way back to the Neolithic era, however, the first written sources for Frisian history come from Roman records, like Tacitus's account of an unsuccessful Frisian attack on a Roman fort. Frisia would go on to distinguish itself culturally from other Germanic peoples but remained recognizably Germanic nonetheless.

In the High Middle Ages, Frisians took to the seas with well crafted ships to perform trade and to raid other ports, cities, and towns in other parts of Europe. For most of its modern history, Frisia, or Fryslân, has been under the control of the Netherlands but today their language is co-official with Dutch at the provincial level. Frisian is the most closely related language to English aside from Scots.

== Prehistory and Roman times ==
The first permanent settlement in modern-day Friesland dates from around 3500 BC, with the first Indoeuropeans settling there around 2950 BC with the Corded Ware culture.

The first Germanic tribes such as the Frisii began settling in Frisia around 700 BC.

According to Pliny the Younger, in Roman times, the Frisians (or, as it may be, their close neighbours, the Chauci) lived on terps, man-made hills. According to other sources, the Frisians lived along a broader expanse of the North Sea (or "Frisian Sea") coast.

The Frisii described by Roman authors in the first century AD lived as far south as the Rhine, and on islands within the old Rhine delta. Their territory therefore corresponded roughly to the present-day provinces of Friesland and North Holland.

Frisians appear to have been among the Germanic groups who settled in Britain during the so-called Migration period (Völkerwanderung), as Angles and Saxons travelled from their home base through Frisian territory in what is now northern Germany and central Netherlands.

== Kingdom of Frisia ==
The Frisian Realm during its great expansion

The 8th-century historian Bede also used the term 'Frisians' for Franks in the south of Frisia. However, these were probably not the Frisians of Roman times. This kingdom comprised the coastal provinces of the Netherlands and the German North Sea coast. During this time, the Frisian language was spoken along the entire southern North Sea coast and, today, this region is sometimes referred to as Greater Frisia or Frisia Magna. The 7th-century Frisian realm (650-734) under the kings Aldegisel and Redbad, had its centre of power in the city Utrecht. Its end came in 734 at the Battle of the Boarn, when the Frisians were defeated by the Franks, who then conquered the western part up to the Lauwers. They conquered the area east of the Lauwers in 785, when Charlemagne defeated Widukind. This Frisia Magna was partly occupied by Vikings in the 840s, until they were expelled between 885 and 920. It has also been suggested that the Vikings did not conquer Frisia, but settled in certain parts (such as the island of Wieringen), where they built simple forts and cooperated and traded with the native Frisians. One of their leaders was Rorik of Dorestad.

== Loss of territory ==
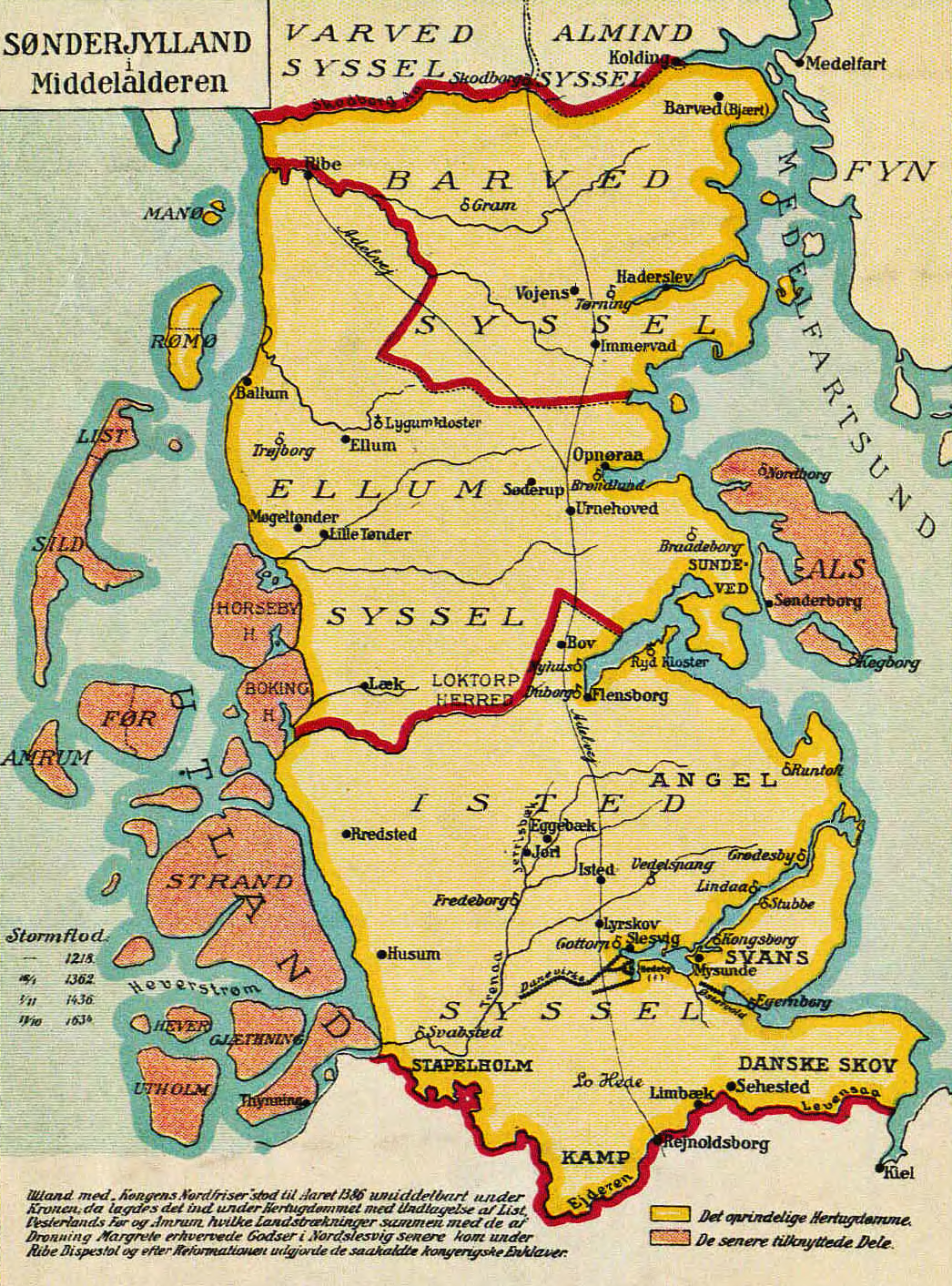
During the Nordic Middle Ages, the mainland part of Schleswig was divided into three sýslur, viz. Barved, Ellum and Isted. The North Frisian Islands were known as Utlande.

Frisians made polders in West Friesland, which became more and more separated from Friesland because of floods. The western part of Frisia became the county of Holland in 1101, after a few centuries of a diverging history than the other parts. Frisia began to identify itself as a country with free folk in the Middle Ages. The bishopric of Utrecht no longer belonged to Frisia. There were many floods in the 11th and 12th centuries, which led to the deaths of many and eventually formed the Zuider Zee. The largest flood occurred in 1322, in which many hundreds of people drowned.

== Upstalsboom League ==
The free Frisians and the city of Groningen founded the Upstalsboom League to counter feudalism. The league consisted of modern Friesland, Groningen, East Frisia and the German North Sea coast, and parts of the Danish North Sea coast (Schleswig). But the Upstalsboom League did not consist only of Frisians, as the area of Zevenwouden and the city of Groningen were Saxon. Some Frisians lived under the rule of the counts of Holland in West Friesland. The first known meeting took place in 1156 to settle disagreements between two East Frisian areas. In March 1338 the judges, councilors and communities of all Frisian countries, gathered in Appingedam, concluded a treaty with the king of France, which was also ratified with the seal of the Upstalsboom. That is probably the last formal meeting that took place.

== 15th century ==
The 15th century saw the end of Frisian Freedom. The city of Groningen started to dominate Groningen. A petty nobleman in East Frisia managed to defeat the other petty noblemen and became count of East Frisia. The Archbishop of Bremen-Hamburg and the king of Denmark conquered large areas of Frisia. Only Friesland remained for the Frisian Freedom. Friesland was conquered in the 1490s by Duke Albert of Saxony-Meissen. Later, the giant Pier Gerlofs Donia (Grutte Pier) would fight for his country's freedom. He had many successes, but ultimately failed to secure Frisia's independence. He died a poor farmer in 1520. In 1519 already, his lieutenant Wijard Jelckama took over the command of Donia's armies. He was less successful, yet did have minor victories. When Jelckama eventually got caught in 1523, his armies were not even one third the size they were when he took over four years earlier. He was then tried, found guilty of treason, and decapitated.

== Frisian territories ==
- West Friesland remained a part of Holland and became a part of North Holland around 1800. The current region of West Friesland is smaller than historical West Friesland and there is also an official constitutional region (samenwerkingsregio) of West Friesland for coast protection, the police, and agriculture.
- Friesland got its independence back (with constitutionalized farmer representation) in 1581 and gave it up permanently in 1795. It is now a Dutch province.
- East Frisia was taken over by the Kingdom of Prussia, then annexed by the Kingdom of Holland and after that became a part of the French Empire before being re-annexed by Prussia. Today it is a district of the federal state of Lower Saxony in the Federal Republic of Germany.
- Groningen has been a province of the Netherlands since the 16th century.
- North Frisia was a part of the Danish duchy of Schleswig (also: South Jutland) and the royal enclaves (Kongerigske enklaver) of the Kingdom of Denmark, and belongs now to the German state of Schleswig-Holstein.
- The Frisian islands off the coast of the Netherlands and Germany are the leftover dunes of flooded lands.

== See also ==
- Canon of Friesland
- List of Frisian battles
