= Brokmerbrief =

13th-century East Frisian law code

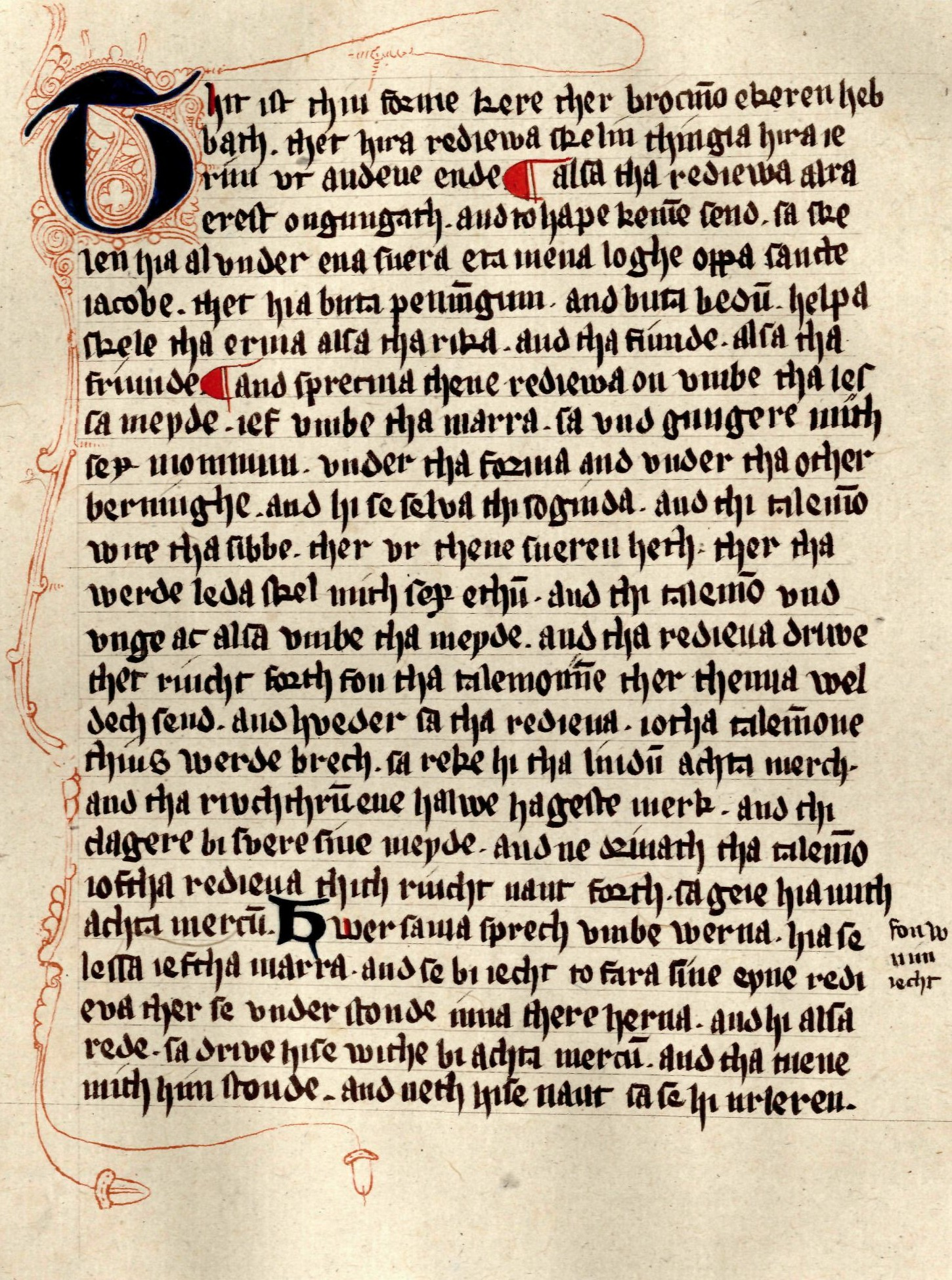
First page of one manuscript of the Brokmerbrief

The Brokmerbrief or Law of Brokmerland is the early 13th-century law code of the brocmanni, the inhabitants of Brokmerland, west of Aurich in East Frisia. The area had been placed under cultivation and settled by the end of the 12th century. It survives in two manuscripts. The work is sometimes referred to as the Brookmerbrief, using the modern spelling of "Brookmerland".

The Brokmerbrief is the most complete source on Frisian law. It describes the polity and judicial system of a country whose law was based on the will of the assembled people (the 'Frisian freedom'): political and judicial power was in the hands of functionaries selected annually from the ranks of the farmers, who were known as redjeven (consuls, counsellors); their power in turn was regulated by the Brokmerbrief.

The period of independent rural self-rule came to an end by about the mid-14th century. However, unlike for example Emsigerland, Brokmerland remained a discrete unit, since the Brokmerbrief forbids the erection of fortified stone residences and castles and this had prevented the establishment of such starting points for localised rule. Thus feudalism, otherwise widespread throughout Europe at this time, remained unknown in East Frisia.

However, Emsig Law eventually prevailed in the area, probably as a result of the emergence of the tom Brok dynasty, but certainly by the time of Cirksena hegemony. In the early 16th century, Edzard I then based his East Frisian Law (German: Ostfriesisches Landrecht) on the Emsig Law.

The Brokmerbrief is unique among the documents of Old Frisian law in consisting of a code of law in the strict sense, rather than a compilation. It is preserved in two manuscripts, one of which is in the State Archives of Lower Saxony in Oldenburg and the other in the Lower Saxony State Library in Hanover.

The middle section of the text strongly resembles the Emsig law on fines, indicating a common source.

The text is a valuable source of localised and dateable information on Old Frisian.

== Sources ==
- Wybren Jan Buma (Ed.): Die Brokmer Rechtshandschriften. Oudfriese Taal- en Rechtsbronnen 5. The Hague: Nijhoff, 1949. OCLC 1039361. (in German)
- Wilhelm Ebel and Wybren Jan Buma. Das Brokmer Recht. Altfriesische Rechtsquellen 2. Göttingen: Vandenhoeck & Ruprecht, 1965. ISBN 3-525-18151-5 (in German)
