= Federgo =

Historical region in East Frisia

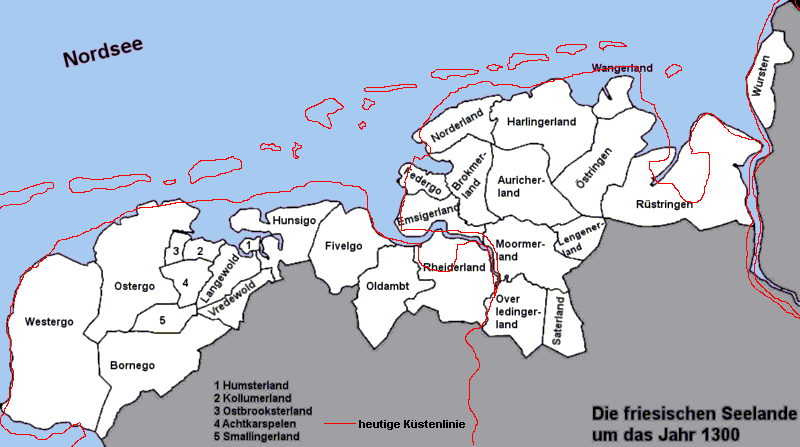
The Frisian coastal lands around 1300

The Federgo, also Federitga, was a historic region, situated on the northwestern edge of East Frisia, by the Wadden Sea, which roughly covered the present-day parish of Krummhörn. Before the breach of the Leybucht bay the parish of Norden also belonged to Federgo. The gau probably derives its name from the conspicuous marsh plants growing there.

The Federgo is bordered in the east by the Brokmerland and in the south by the Emsigerland.
