= Upstalsboom =

Medieval Frisian assembly

Coordinates: 53°27′14″N 7°25′52″E

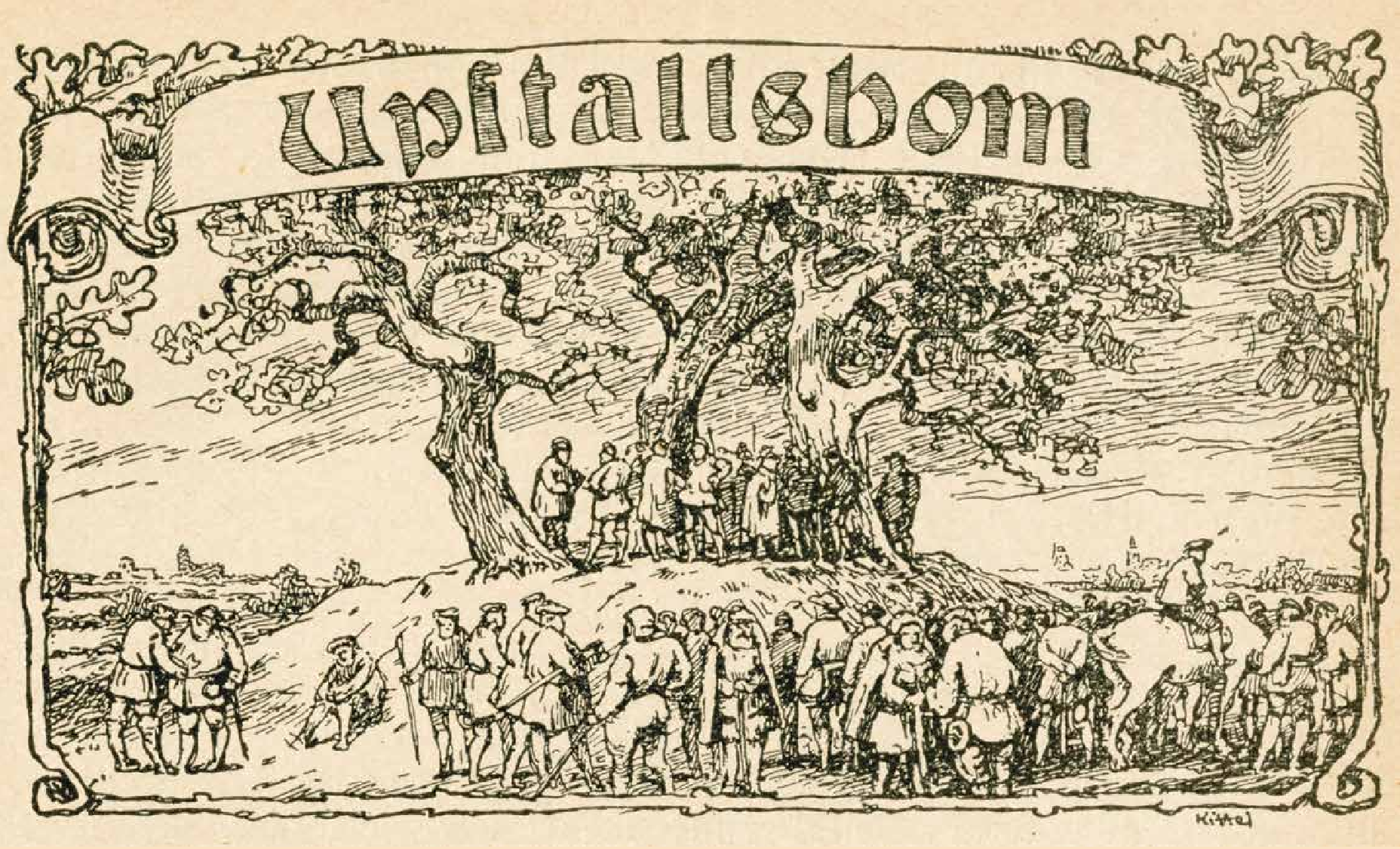
The Upstalsboom by Ludwig Kittel, 1921

During the Frisian freedom period, the Upstalsboom (Old Frisian: Opstallisbame or Upstallesbam), (Note: West Frisian: Upstalbeam; Saterland Frisian: Upstalsboom; North Frisian: Upstalsboom) also known as the Opstalsbam, was an assembly for emissaries of the Seven Sealands of medieval Frisia, located just outside the East Frisian town of Aurich (Saterland Frisian: Aurk) in modern-day Germany. The origins of the Upstalsboom, including its name, are unclear, but as far back as the 8th century the meeting place was used as a burial ground for the members of important Frisian families.

Attested in writing as early as the first half of the 13th century, the assembly convened every year on the Tuesday after Pentecost to discuss issues pertinent to all Frisian lands. Although marked by weak central authority and frequent infighting, Frisian territories showed great success repelling foreign invaders. In 1323, the Statutes of Upstalsboom were ratified, providing a legal framework for interaction between the Seven Sealands, such as prohibiting certain actions, prescribing punishments for crimes, establishing exchange rates for currencies, providing legal rights between citizens of different sealands, and establishing a defense pact. The punishments described in the 1323 ratification are considered to have been extreme for the time and place, but when the treaty was reaffirmed in 1361, additional punishments were scaled back. Different versions of the statutes exist today, but it is one of the few legal texts with both Old Frisian and Latin translations still in existence.

== Description ==
The Upstalsboom's location in modern-day northern Germany

The Upstalsboom was a political assembly that regularly met near the East Frisian town of Aurich in modern-day Germany. The participants were members of a pan-Frisian alliance known as the Upstalsboom League that met every year to discuss political and legal issues pertinent to the alliance, especially foreign policy. Each sealand sent one representative, called a redjeven; they went to the Upstalsboom on the Tuesday following Pentecost and served a one-year term. The name "Upstalsboom" means 'the tree of Upstal', but the meaning of Upstal is obscure; it may have referred to a place which was elevated and dry. Archeological evidence has shown that members of important families were buried at the site in the early Middle Ages as early as the 8th century.

During its earliest period as an assembly, it established laws to affirm the payment of fines (Old Frisian: frede) paid to local counts. While it is unclear exactly when the league arose, it is believed that the assembly was originally of East Frisian origin, particularly those communities between the Lauwers and Weser rivers, and that Central Frisians joined sometime thereafter. Although several places in the Seven Sealands were used for the meetings of one sealand or another, the Upstalsboom is the only known assembly where representatives of different sealands met. The assemblies at the Upstalsboom have been compared to the medieval Icelandic Þingvellir, though it is unclear how much the Upstalsboom assemblies relied on an oral recitation of the legal code.

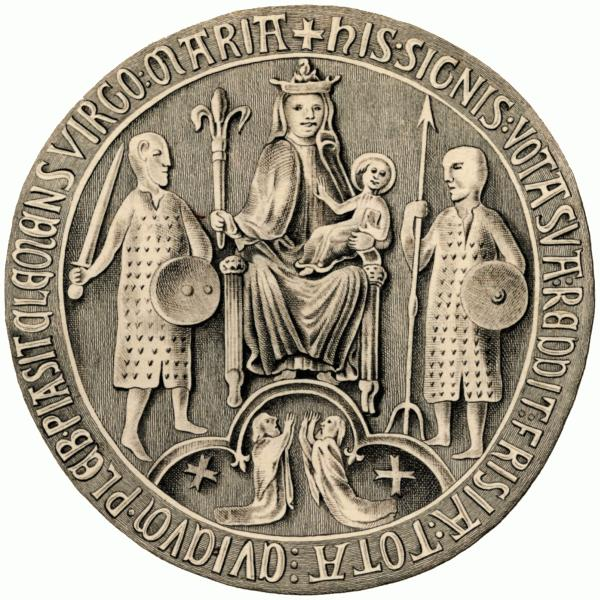
Seal of the Upstalsboom League from 1324

The oldest known Old Frisian legal text – the Seventeen Statutes (Da Saunteen Kesta), estimated as early as the first half of the 11th century – appears to have been issued by the Upstalsboom League, but the league itself is not attested in documents until around 1220. Beginning in 1220, the Upstalsboom League was embroiled in a conflict between two villages in the Ommelanden, which dragged Fivelingo, Hunsingo, Groningen, and several others into the conflict. When the villages in the Ommelanden made peace in 1250, they began waging war on Groningen. Although there was some cooperation in light of the Upstalsboom, violence between sealands and villages persisted. One of the major issues with the Upstalboom League was that it failed to secure enough military power to enforce its own agreements. In particular, the growing power of Groningen – which was not originally a part of the Upstalsboom League – gave it the ability to enforce its will on its environs; the Upstalsboom was powerless to take action against it.

Following the Siege of Groningen in 1338 by the Count of Gelre, Groningen was weakened enough that it was forced to join the league, though both remained relatively weak. Still, other than two major failures in 1270 against the Count of Stotel and in 1289 against Holland, the Frisian freedom period was marked by extremely successful repulsion of foreign powers attempting to invade Frisia; Frisian solidarity, though lacking significant central authority, was able to ward off its enemies with success. In 1338, the Upstalsboom League entered a military alliance with France against England and the Count of Gelre. In 1361, Groningen attempted (and at first failed) to play a more significant role in the league as it began to restructure its economic position in response to the waning of outside trade. It was able to maneuver successfully by offering its organized police force to rural areas which lacked them. This gave Groningen executive authority in several areas of Frisia, and the monetary policy of the 1323 agreements was reaffirmed in 1361.

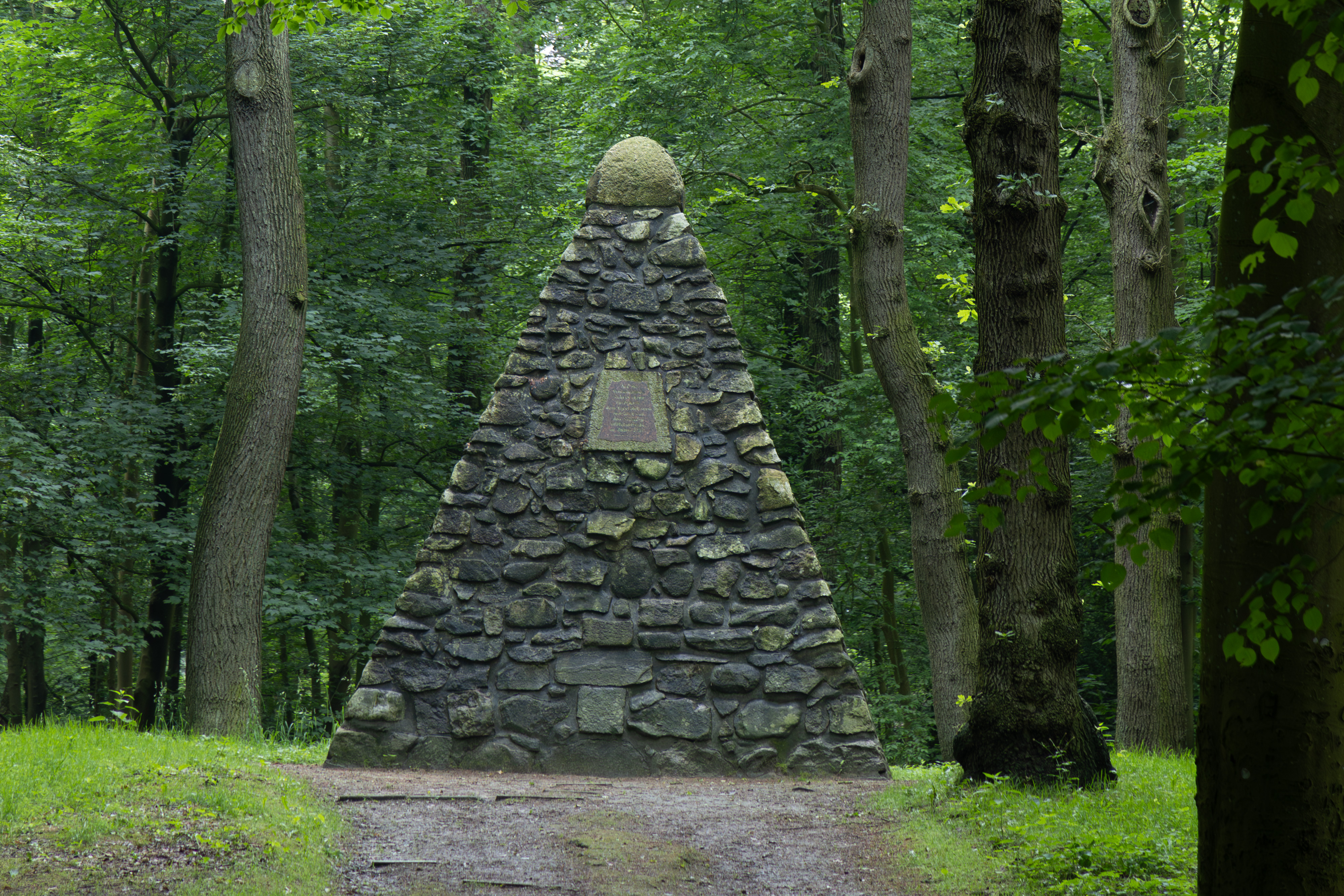
The stone pyramid at the Upstalsboom, commemorating the Frisian freedom period, was erected in 1883.

Despite its failures, the Upstalsboom remains highly regarded in Frisian culture as a symbol of freedom: the German historian Ubbo Emmius referred to the Upstalsboom as the "altar of freedom" in his works and some tourists even travel to the site to take dirt home in small bottles. In 1883, a stone pyramid was erected at the site to memorialize the Frisian freedom period.

== Statutes of Upstalsboom ==
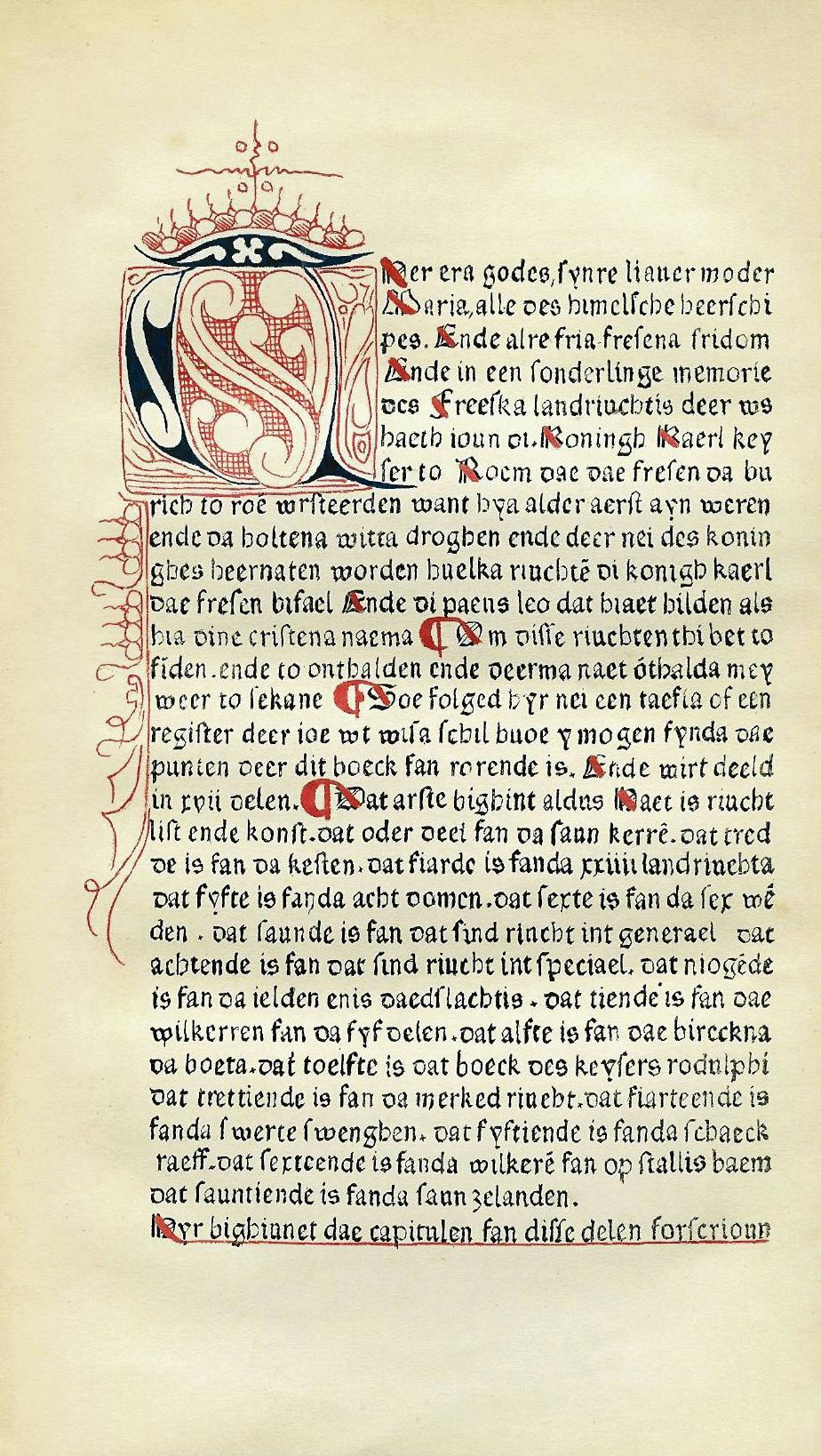
Prolog of the Freeska Landriucht (c. 1484—1487) (Note: The Old Frisian incipit reads: Ther era Godes, synre liaber moder Maria, alle des himelsche heerschipes ende alre fria Fresena fridom. Ende in een sonderlinge memorie des Freeska landriuchtis deer us haeth joun di koningh Kaerl, keyser to Roem, dae dae Fresen da burich to Roem ursteerden. ('In honor of God, his dear mother Mary, all of the heavenly hosts, and the Frisian Freedom. And in special memory of the Frisian land law which was given to us by King Charlemagne, the Roman emperor, when the Frisians conquered the citadel in Rome.'))

The Statutes of Upstalsboom were first ratified on 18 September 1323 in Central Frisia in an attempt to revive the Upstalsboom League – which had begun to lose its legal force – as claims pressed by the Count of Holland increasingly threatened the region.

Three versions of the Statutes have survived to the modern day, two in Old Frisian and one in Latin. One of the Old Frisian versions consists of twenty-four paragraphs translated while the other is thirty-six paragraphs. The Latin version, also comprising twenty-four paragraphs, is believed to be the original. The statutes are one of only a few existing law texts existing in both Latin and Old Frisian.

The shorter Old Frisian version is noteworthy for its exclusion of paragraphs twenty-two and twenty-three, which dealt with monetary matters; paragraph twenty-two was dedicated to determining which mendicant orders would be allowed to raise funds for alms in which sealands, while the following paragraph explains which currencies could be accepted in Frisian territory and provides a conversion table to estimate exchange rates. The conversion table defines the Westphalian penny, for example, as 3/4 of a new English penny or 4/5 of an old English penny. It appears that these two paragraphs were later additions to the Statutes. The following year, the league issued more privileges and sanctions with respect to minting.

The Statutes found in the Freeska Landriucht ('Frisian Land Law') – a legal codex dated between 1484 and 1487, and the only printed Old Frisian law manuscript – are the twenty-four paragraph version. The statutes are as follows:

Statute	Provision
First clause	Provides a defense pact between all seven of the Frisian sealands
First clause	Provides for every sealand to stand together against any attempts to "damage or to bring shame" to any individual sealand
Second clause	Prohibits theft, robbery, hiding a thief or robber, and committing violence in the commission thereof
Second clause	Prescribes a fine of twenty marks
Third clause	Prohibits arson and prescribes a fine of seven times the property's value and a fine of twenty marks for its commission
Third clause	Prohibits rape and prescribes it to be punished in the same manner as hiding a thief or stolen property
Third clause	Hiding an arsonist is punished in the same manner as hiding a thief or stolen property
Fourth clause	Prohibits betraying and killing a sealand's lord and prescribes the punishment to be the same as for an arsonist
Fourth clause	Prescribes a twenty-mark fine for hiding a monk or nun who has been summoned by their prelate and for obstructing justice
Fifth clause	Prohibits violence against priests
Fifth clause	Prescribes a twenty-mark fine for its commission
Sixth clause	Prohibits killing a judge either on his way to Upstalsboom, at the Upstalsboom, or on his way back from the Upstalsboom
Sixth clause	Prohibits killing any other attendant to the Upstalsboom
Sixth clause	Prescribes a four hundred–mark fine for killing a judge and a one hundred sixty–mark fine for killing any other attendant
Seventh clause	Prohibits killing the citizen of one sealand in another sealand
Seventh clause	Prescribes an eighty-mark fine
Eighth clause	Prohibits rebellion
Eighth clause	Invokes a separate defense pact where any request to any other sealand that is answered for rebellion will be paid for with one hundred marks
Ninth clause	Prohibits possession of a weapon
Ninth clause	Prescribes a five-mark fine for its commission
Tenth clause	Prescribes a ten-mark fine for any unlawful decree or sentence passed by a judge
Eleventh clause	Prohibits disturbing the peace
Eleventh clause	Prescribes "a just reconciliation" to be deemed by the judge or be charged with perjury
Twelfth clause	Prohibits killing, maiming, paralyzing, or otherwise injuring a layperson
Twelfth clause	Prescribes a seven-weregild fine for killing and a sevenfold fine in accordance with disturbing the peace
Twelfth clause	Prescribes a sevenfold fine for all other injuries and a sevenfold fine in accordance with disturbing the peace
Thirteenth clause	Prohibits killing, maiming, paralyzing, or otherwise injuring a priest, dean, or subdean
Thirteenth clause	Prescribes a ten-weregild fine for killing and a tenfold fine in accordance with disturbing the peace
Thirteenth clause	Prescribes a sevenfold fine for all other injuries and a sevenfold fine in accordance with disturbing the peace
Fourteenth clause	Prohibits bride kidnapping
Fourteenth clause	Prescribes a one hundred–mark fine and must compensate any violence sustained in the capture in accordance with the previous statutes
Fifteenth clause	Provides primacy for paternal descendants in land disputes unless the maternal line is closer in lineage to the person in question
Sixteenth clause	Provides rights for inheritance, stating that a dying person must have a proper confessor to whom he must give approval
Sixteenth clause	Prescribes a twenty-mark fine for infringement of this right
Seventeenth clause	Provides a process for overturning laws proclaimed by a gretman (Note: This was a Frisian legal position similar to a magistrate or president of the court.)
Seventeenth clause	Invalidates any law where the invalidation has been approved by four "wise priests" and one prelate "because of public necessity and usefulness"
Eighteenth clause	Prohibits violating a truce, sworn oath, or kiss of reconciliation
Eighteenth clause	Prescribes outlawing for a year and one day and sending the offender to the pope "or his authorized representative" to do penance in Rome
Eighteenth clause	Prescribes the revocation of property for an offender with stone houses being destroyed and wooden houses being taken into royal domain
Nineteenth clause	Provides that blinding by gouging, and cutting off of the hands, feet, nose, tongue, or lips are to be compensated as if they had been a homicide
Twentieth clause	Prohibits behavior against public interest, the treaty, or the union of Frisian states, including by conspiring, fighting, hindering, or making contrary pacts against it
Twentieth clause	Prescribes a twenty-mark fine for the first offense and another twenty-mark fine for any offenses thereafter if done with a group
Twenty-first clause	Describes the "begging of monks"
Twenty-second clause	Describes currency
Twenty-third clause	Provides the right, in a dispute between two parties of different sealands, to have the case heard in three days, irrespective of severity
Twenty-third clause	Provides the out-of town sealander the right for the local gretman to pay the expenses of the out-of-town sealander until the case is resolved if the case is not heard in three days
Twenty-third clause	If the case concerns an amount less than eight marks, six neighbors, seven relatives, and one opstalling (Note: This was a judge who acted on behalf of the Upstalsboom League.) must provide evidence or testimony.
Twenty-third clause	If the case concerns more than eight marks, two opstallingen must be present.
Twenty-third clause	Any opstalling providing testimony must be in the jurisdiction of the sealand in which the case is being heard.
Twenty-fourth clause	Provides that each Easter, a judge from each sealand will return to Upstalsboom, swear an oath of office, and affirm each statute in order to remain in office

Several authors have referred to the terms of the statutes as extreme for the region and period; it has been suggested that this is a consequence of an increasing lawlessness among the Frisians during this period. In 1361, the statutes were reaffirmed and a clause adding a forty-mark payment to the heirs of a homicide victim by whoever hid a murder from justice in another sealand; this was twice the typical weregild. This later decrease from the previously excessive weregild price is unexplained.

== See also ==
- Brokmerbrief – 13th-century East Frisian law code
- Frisian Kingdom – c. 600–734 realm in northwestern Europe
- Pier Gerlofs Donia – Frisian warrior, pirate, and rebel (1480–1520)
