= Rheiderland =

Historical region in Germany and the Netherlands

Coordinates: 53.2333°N 7.3000°E

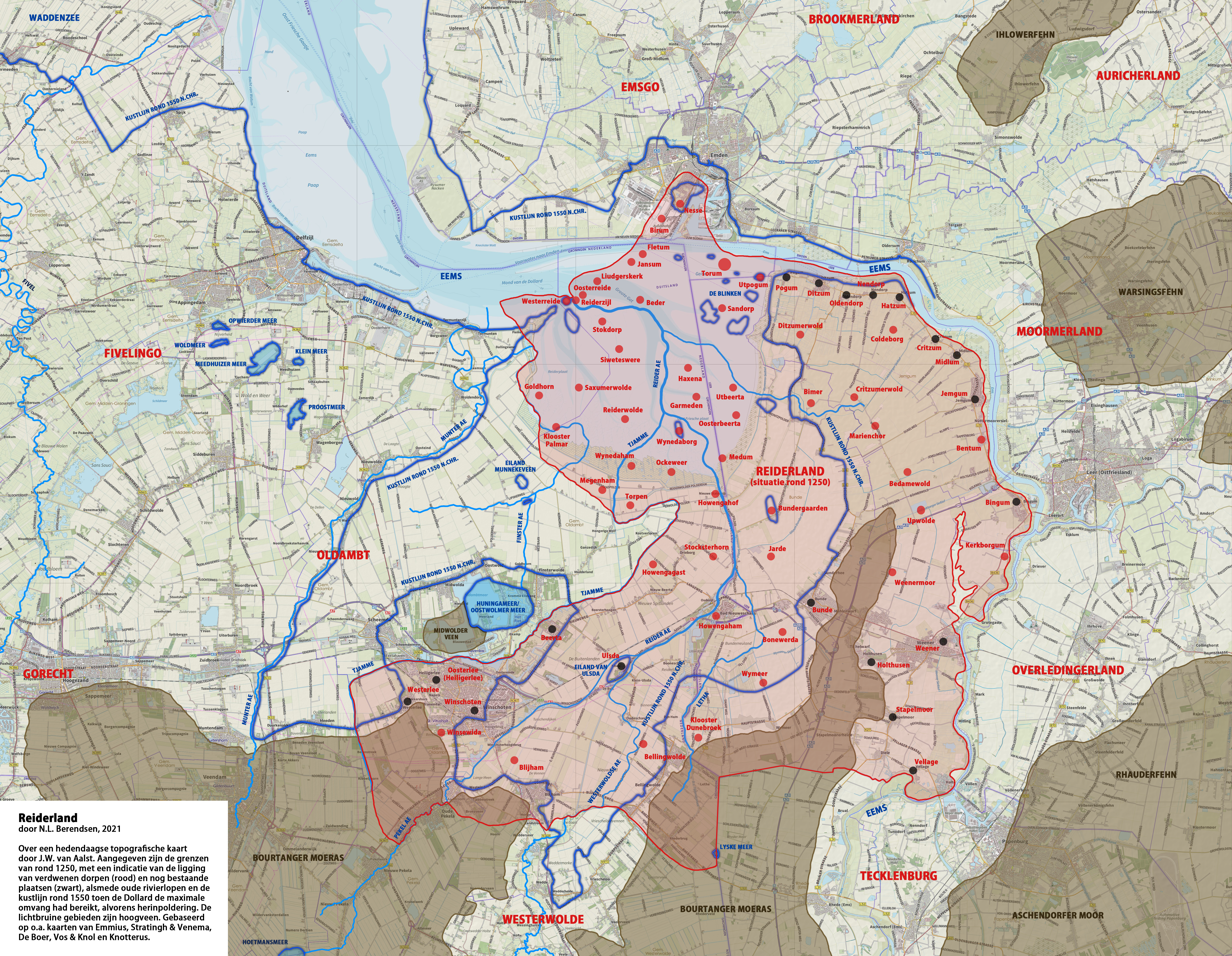
The medieval region of Rheiderland (in red) which straddles the border in northwest Germany and northeast Netherlands.

The Rheiderland (German: [ˈʁaɪdɐˌlant]; Reiderland [ˈrɛidərˌlɑnt]) is a region of Germany and the Netherlands between the River Ems and the Bay of Dollart. The German part of the Rheiderland lies in East Frisia, west of the Ems. The Dutch part (written: Reiderland) lies in the Dutch province of Groningen and is mostly part of Oldambt. The Rheiderland is one of the four historic regions on the mainland in the district of Leer; the others being the Overledingerland, the Moormerland and the Lengenerland.

== Nature ==
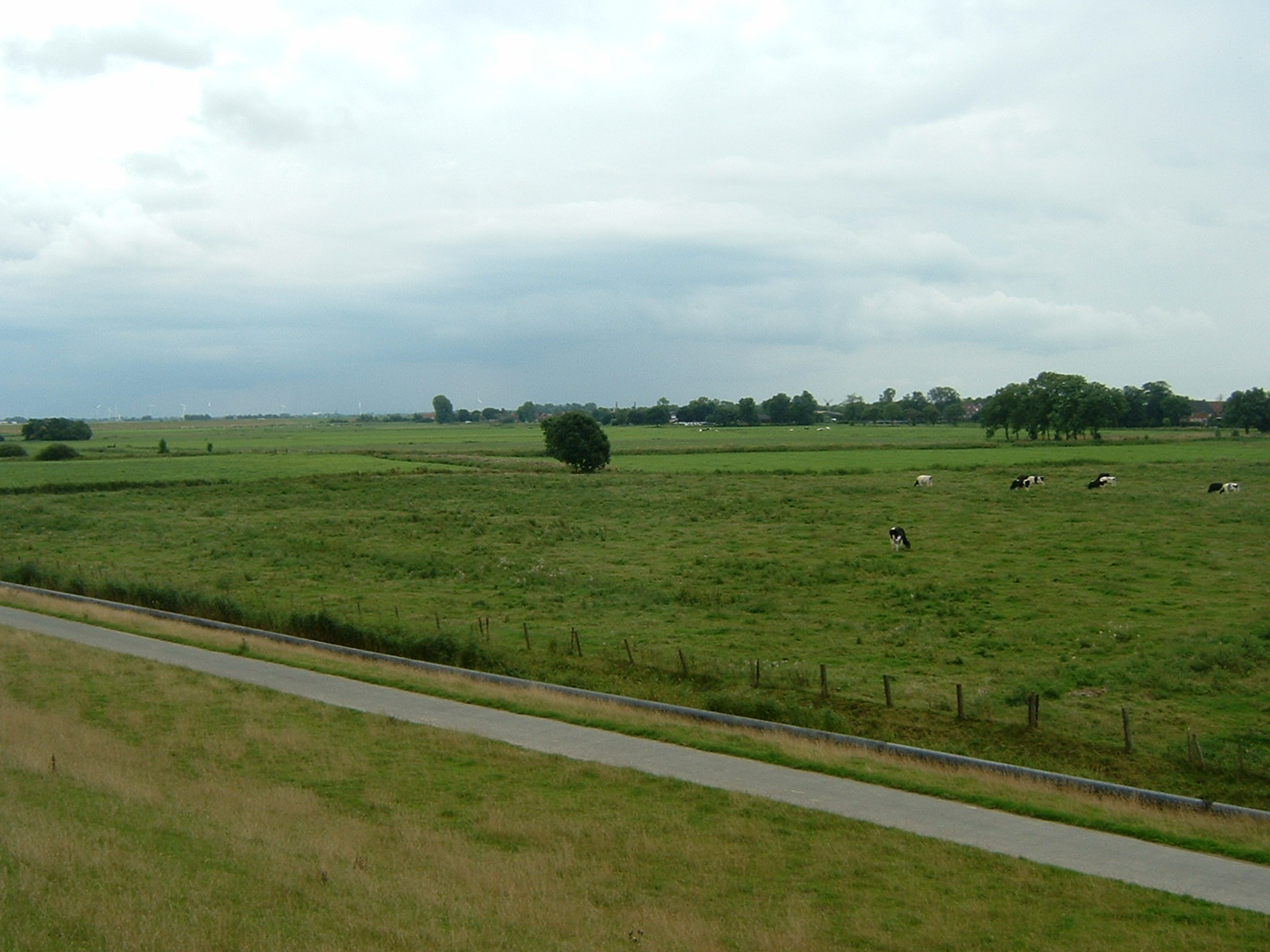
View from the dyke

The Rheiderland consists largely of marshland (polder) and is as flat as the rest of East Frisia, but there are fewer trees. As a result the view is generally clear as far as the horizon. Along the River Ems are the historic river marshes, down to 1.50 metres below sea level. Numerous birds breed on the damp and wet meadows including the peewit, black-tailed godwit and redshank. In winter up to 120,000 wild geese forage here (especially the greater white-fronted goose, barnacle goose and greylag goose). The grasslands of the Rheiderland are also a stopover of exceptional international significance for the golden plover, Eurasian whimbrel, curlew and peewit. As a result of its importance for bird migration the area was designated as an EU Important Bird Area in 2000.

The northwestern part of the Rheiderland was reclaimed by several dyke systems from the Dollart Bay. The marshy soils are very fertile, but higher as a result of the way they were created historically and therefore capable of being farmed. The farmers used to be well-to-do (and known as "polder princes" or Polderfürsten), which is reflected today by their impressive Gulf farmhouses. In the south of the Rheiderland there were also areas of moorland, the outliers of the Bourtanger Moor. Apart from a small residual area of moor near Wymeer, the moors have now been destroyed.

== Religion ==
The predominant religion is the Evangelical Reformed Church, to which adhere around 70% of the population on the German side. Extant ecclesiastical monuments of this sect include the churches at Bunde, Ditzum and Jemgum. The first of these is the largest; the other two have belfries resembling lighthouses. In a few places there are also evangelical Lutheran parishes. There are minorities of Old Reformed and Free Church communities, and a single Roman Catholic parish at Weener. In this connection the region is well known for its large number of significant church organs, which have survived for centuries since they were built. The most significant is the Arp-Schnitger Organ in St George's church at Weener.

On the Dutch side, secularisation has progressed much further. A mere minority adheres to one or other of the reformed churches. There are Dutch Protestant church parishes at Finsterwolde and Nieuweschans.

== Culture and language ==
The Niederdeutsch language is widely used for everyday purposes. Most people in the German part of Rheiderland speak East Frisian, or a local sub-dialect of that. In the Dutch part, in addition to Dutch, a dialect very similar to East Frisian is spoken.

Dutch was the main ecclesiastical language until the 19th century, and has left many traces in the local dialect. On the grounds of its close cultural and linguistic connection with Dutch, the Netherlands claimed the area after World War II, albeit unsuccessfully.

== Politics ==
The largest settlement is the town of Weener. Administratively, the German part of the Rheiderland is divided into the communities of Weener, Bunde and Jemgum and the sub-community of Bingum in the town of Leer. On the Dutch side Rheiderland includes the community of Reiderland, the northern part of that of Bellingwedde, the eastern part of Scheemda and the community of Winschoten.

Despite the sparse population and the almost complete absence of industry, the area is a Social Democrat stronghold.

== Coat of arms ==
Per pale, on the dexter side Or, an eagle sable, on the sinister side azure, a fleur de lis of the first. The arms derive from a medieval seal. The eagle is found in many Frisian arms and signifies the area's direct subsidiarity to the Empire and therewith the freedoms of the Frisians. The fleur de lis is a pre-Reformation symbol of purity and of the Blessed Virgin Mary, the patron saint of the Frisians. The arms were taken from the former District of Weener.

== History ==
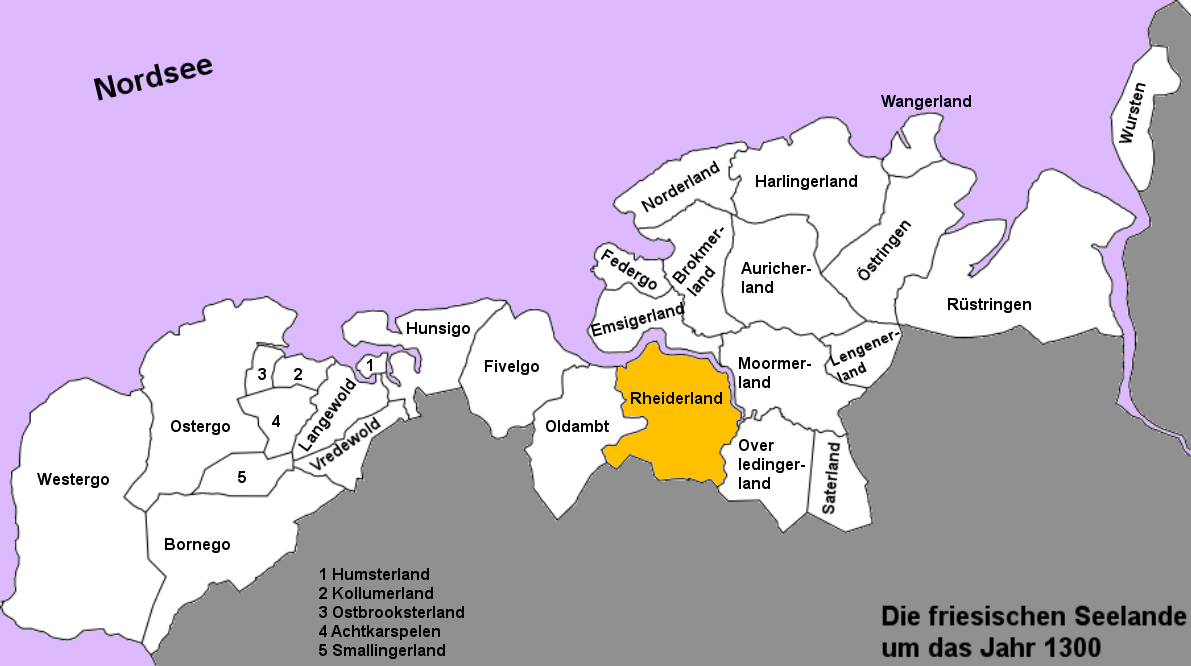
Rheiderland around 1300

Rheiderland was settled by Frisians from an early date. After the foreign rulers were expelled from Friesland, Rheiderland, like the other Frisian areas, developed a territory directly subsidiary to the Holy Roman Empire, whose constitution included a governing council. The feudal system was unknown in this region. The main settlements were Weener and Hatzum.

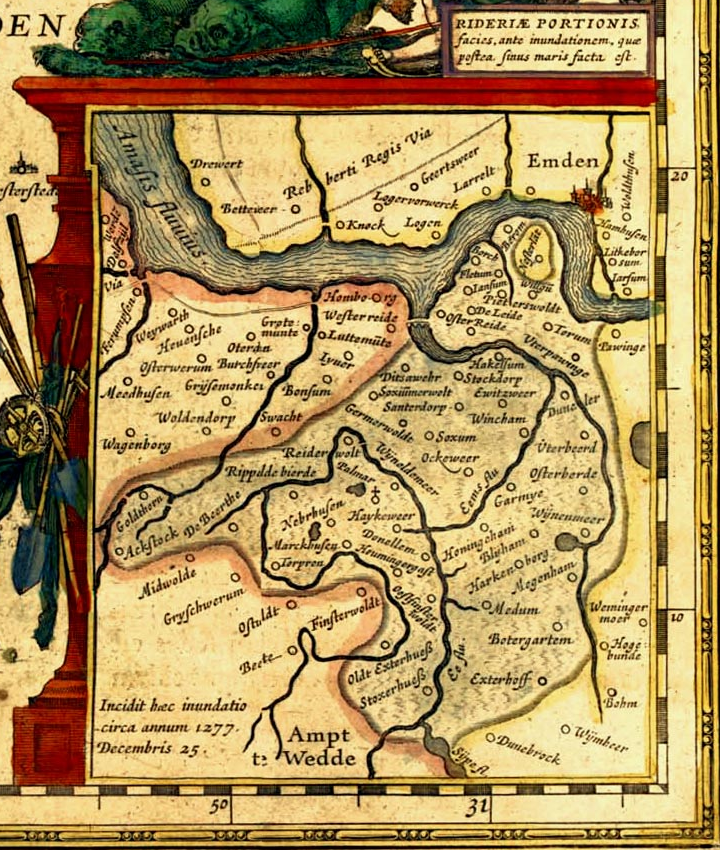
Map of Rheiderland c. 1277 including the settlements on the Dollart subsequently lost to the sea (according to Ubbo Emmius).

Rheiderland became oriented towards Ommelanden. From 1362, due to the invasion of the sea, large districts of the area were submerged, creating a natural boundary, and the links with the Frisian areas east of the Ems developed. Much of the submerged land was reclaimed from the sea as a polder, a process which continued until the 20th century.

From 1413 the area fell under the dominion of the Tom Brok family, and subsequently of Focko Ukena and then the Cirksena family. The area was later only independent for a brief period. The same fate befell what is now the German part of Rheiderland, which became part of the County of East Frisia.

Until 1600, Rheiderland was nominally independent under the dominion of the Counts of East Frisia, but it was then definitively annexed to East Frisia. In 1806, when the Holy Roman Empire was dissolved, Rheiderland was included in the Department of Groningen (Département Ems-Occidentale) in the Kingdom of Holland, later part of the French Empire, and was thus separated from East Frisia (the remainder of East Frisia became the Département of Ems-Orientale). After Napoleon fell from power, Rheiderland was reunited with East Frisia within the kingdom of Hanover, later of Prussia.

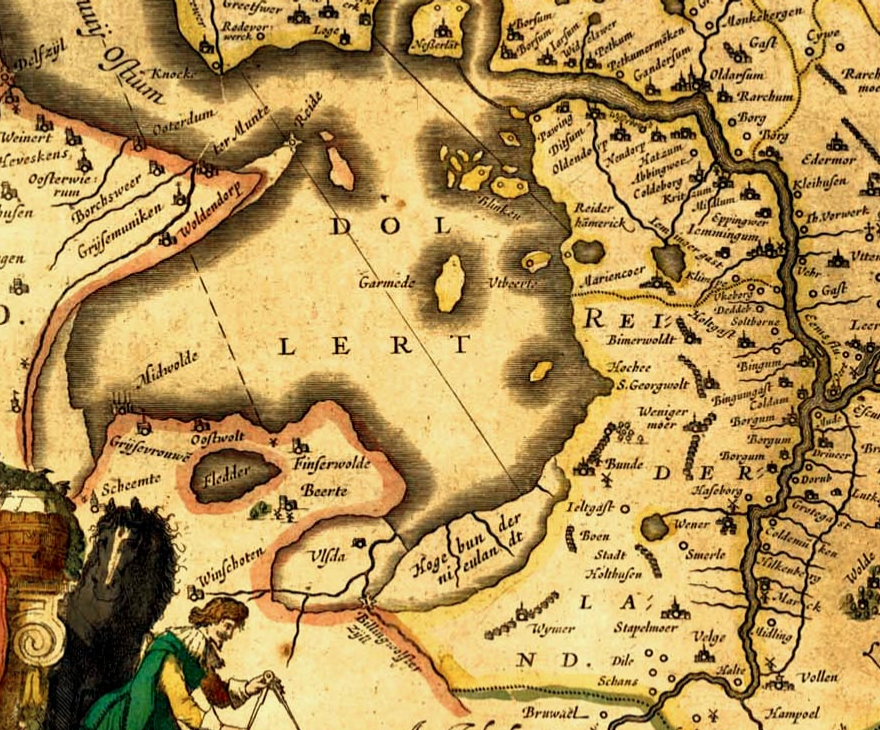
Map of Rheiderland c. 1600 (according to Ubbo Emmius).

Until 1932 the German part of Rheiderland formed the district of Weener in either Hanover or Prussia. By a decree of the Prussian Ministry of State, this district was dissolved and amalgamated with the district of Leer.

After World War II, the Netherlands claimed the whole of Rheiderland, but this claim was rejected by the victorious powers. In the German section the use of Dutch as the majority language quickly resumed. In any case, the only legal grounds for the Dutch claim were that the area had been part of the Kingdom of Holland, a French client kingdom, during the brief years of Napoleonic rule; but the Allied powers had no interest in making territorial changes along Germany's western border.

== Sources ==
- Dodo Wildvang: Das Reiderland - eine geologische, gemeinverständliche Abhandlung. Selbstverlag, Aurich 1920
- David Steen / Georg-Siegfried Jantke (Hg.): Das Rheiderland zwischen Ems und Dollart. Verlag H. Risius, Weener 1987 ISBN 3-88761-035-0
- Helmut Kruckenberg / Matthias Bergmann (2000): Radwandern auf der Dollard-Route. - Verlag Isensee, Oldenburg.
- Klaus Gerdes (2000): Die Vögel des Landkreis Leer. - Verlag Schuster, Leer.
- André R. Köller: Rheiderland oder Reiderland?, Verlag: H. Risius, Weener 2006, ISBN 3-88761-099-7
- Georg Klein: Das Rheiderland (in "Deutsche Landschaften"), S. Fischer Verlag 2003, ISBN 3-10-070404-5
