= Rauwerderhem =

- Voormalige gemeente
- Flag Coat of arms

- Country: Netherlands
- Province: Friesland
- Established: 1812
- Hoofdplaats: Rauwerd

Area
  - Total: 34.73 km^{2} (13.41 sq mi)
  - Land: 33.40 km^{2} (12.90 sq mi)
  - Water: 1.33 km^{2} (0.51 sq mi)

Population (1 January 1974)
  - Total: 2,541

Rauwerderhem is a former municipality in the province of Friesland. It existed until 1984. Rauwerderhem is now named Boarnsterhim (City: Irnsum).
