= Frisian freedom =

Absence of feudalism in medieval Frisia

Frisian freedom Fryske frijheid (West Frisian) Fräiske Fräiegaid (Saterland Frisian) Friese vrijheid (Dutch) Friesische Freiheit (German)
- De facto autonomous region of the Holy Roman Empire
- c. 1100–1498
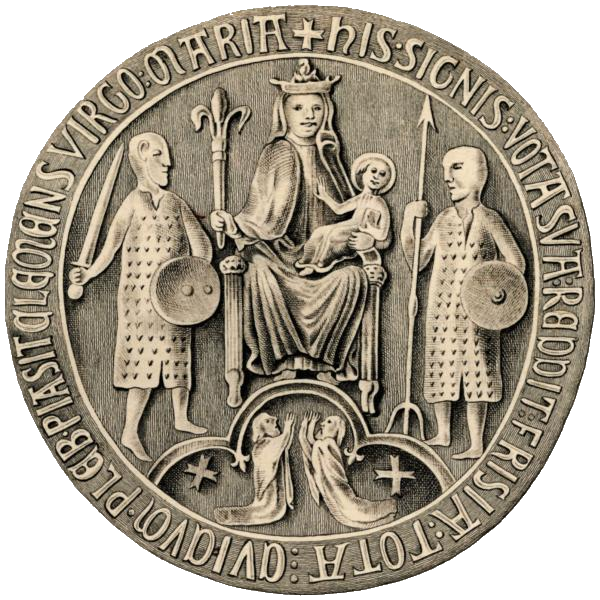
- Seal of the Upstalsboom League from 1324

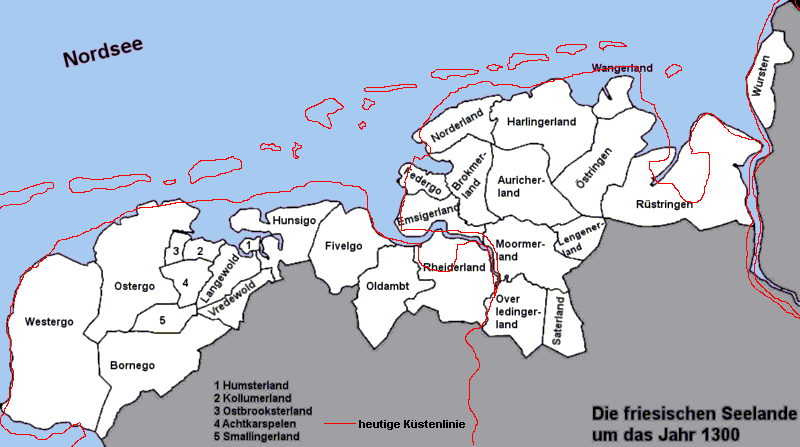
- Map of Frisia in 1300
- Demonym: Frisian
- Historical era: Middle Ages
  - Alleged Karelsprivilege: c. 800
  - Earliest evidence of regional autonomy: c. 1100
  - Recognition of imperial liberty by Sigismund: 1417
  - Establishment of the County of East Frisia: 1464
  - Disestablished: 1498
Preceded by
| Lower Lotharingia |
Succeeded by
| County of Holland |
| Lordship of Frisia |
| Lordship of Ameland |
| Lordship of Groningen |
| County of East Frisia |
| County of Norden |
| Lordships of Esens, Stedesdorf and Wittmund |
| Lordship of Jever |
| County of Oldenburg |
| Prince-Archbishopric of Bremen |
- Today part of: Germany; Netherlands

The Frisian freedom (/ˈfriːʒən/; Old Frisian: Fresiska fridom; (Note: Fresiska is sometimes rendered as freeska and fridom is sometimes rendered as frydom. The phrase fry [ende] freesk (lit. 'free [and] Frisian') is also used to reference the Frisian freedom in contemporary Old Frisian documents.) West Frisian: Fryske frijheid; Dutch: Friese vrijheid; German: Friesische Freiheit; Latin: Frisonica libertas) was the form of governance, legal system, and social structure in Frisia during the Middle Ages, characterised by self-government and the absence of feudalism. Its main aspects included freedom from serfdom, feudal duties, and taxation, as well as the election of judges and adjudicators.

According to medieval chronicles, exemption from feudalism was granted to the Frisians by Charlemagne, although the earliest evidence of regional autonomy appears in the 11th century and explicit references to "Frisian freedom" date to the 13th century. Throughout the Middle Ages, Frisians resisted the expansion of feudalism into their lands, fighting a series of wars against the County of Holland in order to maintain their autonomy. During this period, Frisian society was organised in a network of rural communes, people largely governed themselves through public assemblies, and elected judges established a codified legal system without any kind of central government. Frisians formed treaties with other powers to protect their freedom, which was recognised by a number of German kings during the Late Middle Ages.

Frisian freedom was brought to an end in the late-15th century, as increasing levels of class stratification in the East culminated in the establishment of the County of East Frisia, while West Frisia was brought under the rule of Saxony. Since the 16th century, the Frisian freedom has been subject to numerous reinterpretations. During the Dutch Revolt, it was used to argue for the restoration of rights lost under Habsburg rule, and Frisian freedom later inspired American and French Revolutionaries. One Frisian history book from this period contained a fictionalised portrayal of the Frisian freedom, which deeply influenced later Frisian historiography. It was later recast as a national myth by Frisian nationalism, which depicted freedom as an inherent trait of the Frisian people and portrayed a level of historical continuity that is disputed by historians.

== History ==
=== Background ===
The region of Frisia extends along the North Sea coastline, from the Zuiderzee in the west to the Weser in the east. In most of western Europe during the High Middle Ages, social organisation developed along the lines of feudalism, as nobles gained the right of sovereignty over certain territories; but Frisia notably developed along a different path. Beginning in the mid-11th century, Medieval communes spread from northern Italy across much of Europe, gathering strength in areas outside the authority of feudal lords. These communes extended personal freedoms including public participation to its populace, which cultivated within them an antagonism towards feudalism. Within the Holy Roman Empire, some of these communes, including in Frisia, eliminated the power of local princes, establishing quasi-republican systems of government.

=== Development of autonomy ===
Map of the Holy Roman Empire around the time of Frederick II (r. 1220–1250), with the Frisian lands in the north-west

Frisian lands existed in a state of autonomy from at least the 11th century. Although Frisia was officially brought under the rule of the Holy Roman Empire, a de facto system of self-governance developed in the region. The Frisians disregarded the rights of local feudal lords, but still recognised the rule of the Empire, although this remained at a distance in practice.

The earliest references to a "Frisian freedom" date back to the 13th century, with the first documentary evidence of self-governance being found in c. 1220, while the encyclopedist Bartholomaeus Anglicus referred to Frisian attitudes towards liberty in c. 1240. Although medieval Frisia has been compared to the Italian city-states and Old Swiss Confederacy, due to their shared quasi-republican systems of government, Frisia was unique in its contemporary understanding of liberty as an intrinsic value.

For most of its history, Frisian self-governance was maintained in East Frisia, between the Weser and Lauwers rivers. Meanwhile, parts of West Frisia periodically fell under the feudal occupation of the County of Holland. During the Friso-Hollandic Wars, the concept of Frisian freedom was used to mobilise armed resistance to feudalisation attempts by the counts of Holland.

=== Communal and legal institutions ===
In contrast to developments in feudal counties, the Frisian nobility never developed feudal titles, knighthoods were never established, and the centralisation of polities into states was a slow-moving process. Rural communes became the dominant institutional form in Frisia, with higher-level subdivisions coalescing into self-governing districts, known as communitates terrae (West Frisian: Steatsmienskippen; German: Landesgemeinden). Frisians largely governed themselves through community assemblies, also known as things.

Each year, Frisians elected judges from their own ranks. All freeholders were eligible to become adjudicators and were rotated out on an annual basis. The Frisian historian Ubbo Emmius later claimed that the election of judges was "the principle element of liberty". Frisian freedom incentivised the codification of customary law; the earliest surviving Frisian legal manuscripts date back to the late 13th century and the most recent date to the early 16th century.

Medieval Frisian legal codes established a kind of honour system, in which compensation tariffs were used to prevent feuds. This was implemented without any kind of central government, with historian Han Nijdam comparing its functioning to the Icelandic Commonwealth. In 1323, the "Ubstalsboom Laws" were promulgated, declaring that "if any prince, secular or ecclesiastical, [...] shall have assailed us, Frisians, or any of us, wanting to subject us to the yoke of servitude, then together, through a joint call-up and by force of arms, we shall protect our liberty". In 1361, the city of Groningen attempted to revive the Upstalsboom League as its leading polity.

=== Recognition ===
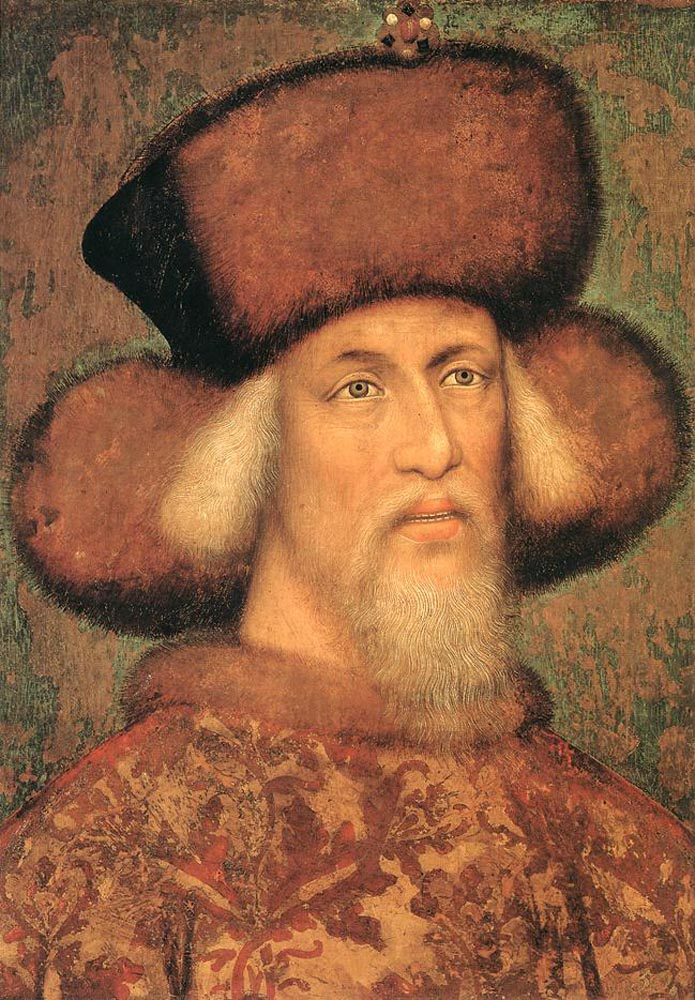
Sigismund, the king of Germany who recognised the Frisian freedom in 1417

It was not until the Late Middle Ages that Frisian freedom was officially recognised by foreign feudal powers. In 1232, the Prince-Bishopric of Utrecht recognised that the Frisians "are free men, and released from any yoke of servitude or anyone's oppressive rule". The French Bartholomaeus Anglicus also recognised the Frisians' freedom from feudal rule and serfdom, as well as their annual election of judges, writing that they "hazard their life for liberty and prefer death to being oppressed by the yoke of servitude".

In the early 13th century, mentions of Frisian liberties having been granted by Charlemagne began to appear in historical literature. According to these medieval chronicles, the Frisian freedom was established by Charlemagne, the first Holy Roman Emperor. But no evidence of this Karelsprivilege has been found prior to the 13th century, leading historian Han Nijdam to describe it as an "ideological embellishment". Frisian scholars also made frequent references to Roman law and philosophy, in their justifications for the Frisian freedom. Between 1297 and 1319, in an attempt to retroactively justify their freedom from feudal rule, some Frisians fabricated a charter that they alleged had been written by Charlemagne and confirmed their freedom from serfdom, feudal duties and taxation.

In 1248, William II of Holland confirmed "all the rights, liberties and privileges conceded to all Frisians by the emperor Charlemagne", but the terms were kept vague, so the decree had little significant effect. In 1338, Frisian communitates sent a letter to Philip VI of France, in which they request he be "mindful of the most beneficial gift of Frisian freedom, [...] conceded to us by Charlemagne, king of the Romans [...], in perpetuity". That same year, following a dispute between Frisians and the city of Groningen, arbitrators issued a charter that declared Groningen would agree to protect the Frisian freedom from feudal lords. In 1361, another charter was issued by a league of Frisian terrae and the city of Groningen, which reaffirmed a joint pact to protect Frisian freedom from "coercion by oppression". This alliance was later invoked during attempts by the Burgundian State to conquer Frisia.

According to a Frisian law book from c. 1295, Frisians collaborated with Rudolf I of Germany on military campaigns, in return for the protection of the Frisian freedom. In 1417, the German king Sigismund issued a charter that granted Frisia "imperial liberty" from princely rule. But as the terms of the charter required that they pay tribute to the state, the Frisians rejected it. Instead, in 1421, they briefly recognised the count of Holland and the Empire subsequently declared Frisia to be a rebellious province. In 1493, German king Maximilian I issued a charter that granted the West Frisians imperial privilege, but this too was rejected by the Frisians, as it stipulated the payment of tribute. A chronicle at the Aduard Abbey also recognised that the Frisians "utterly abhorred the state of servitude for reason of the severity of the princes, as they had experienced earlier".

=== Dissolution ===
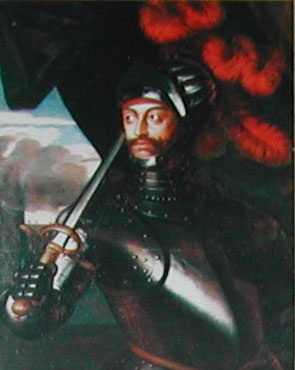
Ulrich I, the first ruler of the County of East Frisia

A largely leaderless society, from 1298, references began to be made to urban officeholders known as aldermen and elected military leaders known as haedlingen, which were often compared to the Italian podestà. By the mid-14th century, haedlingen had grown more rich and powerful, developing into an agrarian aristocracy and becoming the region's de facto ruling class. Between the Ems and Jade rivers in eastern Frisia, the strength of communal institutions were diminished and the communes effectively disappeared, while in the west, village heads increasingly exerted more influence over the communes. As the power of the haedlingen grew, elements of the Frisian freedom such as personal freedom and the election of judges were discarded, as freedom was recast to mean freedom from foreign princes.

In 1420, the East Frisian chieftains Ocko II tom Brok and Sibet Papinga formed an alliance to protect the Frisian freedom from the Teutonic Order; they reinterpreted Frisian freedom as political freedom from foreign rule, rather than freedom from feudal servitude. In 1430, mounting opposition to the East Frisian chieftains culminated with the establishment of a "Freedom League", in which an alliance of Frisian communities attempted to end their quasi-feudal rule. In the mid-to-late 15th century, the Frisian haedlingen recast the Frisian freedom to simply mean freedom from external taxation. In 1464, one of the most powerful East Frisian chieftains, Ulrich I, had reorganised the eastern territories into the County of East Frisia, ending the Frisian freedom there and finally establishing feudal rule in the east.

The Frisian freedom finally came to an end as a result of civil war between the Schieringers and Vetkopers, two factions of the Frisian nobility. In 1498, Maximilian appointed Albert III, Duke of Saxony as governor of the region, with the support of the Schieringers. In 1504, Frisia was officially brought under Saxon law. Although the Frisian freedom was abolished, the Saxons ultimately struggled to introduce feudalism in west Frisia, as the local haedlingen rejected moves to bring them into the nobility. In an attempt to capture Frisia from the Saxons, in 1514, Charles II, Duke of Guelders invaded Frisia, claiming his intention to restore the Frisian freedom.

== Modern reinterpretations ==
=== Early modern period ===
The concept of the Frisian freedom was reinterpreted during the Dutch Revolt, when it was used to argue for the reinstatement of historic rights that had been lost under Habsburg rule. In Friesland, the revolt was seen as a restoration of the Frisian freedom, as described in the writings of the Frisian republican Ubbo Emmius.

Towards the end of the 16th century, a fictionalised version of the history of Frisia, Andreas Cornelius's Croniicke ende waarachtige Beschrijvinge van Vrieslant, was published. Although its account of events was heavily mythologised, the book became very influential on the development of Frisian historiography over the subsequent centuries.

The idea of the Frisian freedom continued to endure into the late 18th century; American Revolutionary John Adams commented that Frisians were "famous for the spirit of liberty", while French Revolutionary Honoré Gabriel Riqueti compared Frisian to "a robust oak, with the sap of liberty preserving its strength and its verdure".

=== Late modern period ===
By the end of the early modern period, when Friesland was integrated into the United Kingdom of the Netherlands, the concept was again reinterpreted during the rise of Frisian nationalism; the Frisian freedom lost its political connotations and was reconceived as a cultural trait of the Frisian people. To nationalists of the 19th and 20th centuries, liberty was an innate characteristic of the Frisian national identity. The Frisian freedom then became a national myth, assuming a continuous history of Frisian independence that lasted for over eight centuries, and the concept was subjected to increased commodification. This reconception has been disputed by academic historians, who have pointed out that the national myth was retroactively constructed in the 19th century and have debated the historical continuity of the Frisian freedom.
