= Appeal War =

Civil wars involving the states and peoples of Europe

Appeal War of 1726–1727
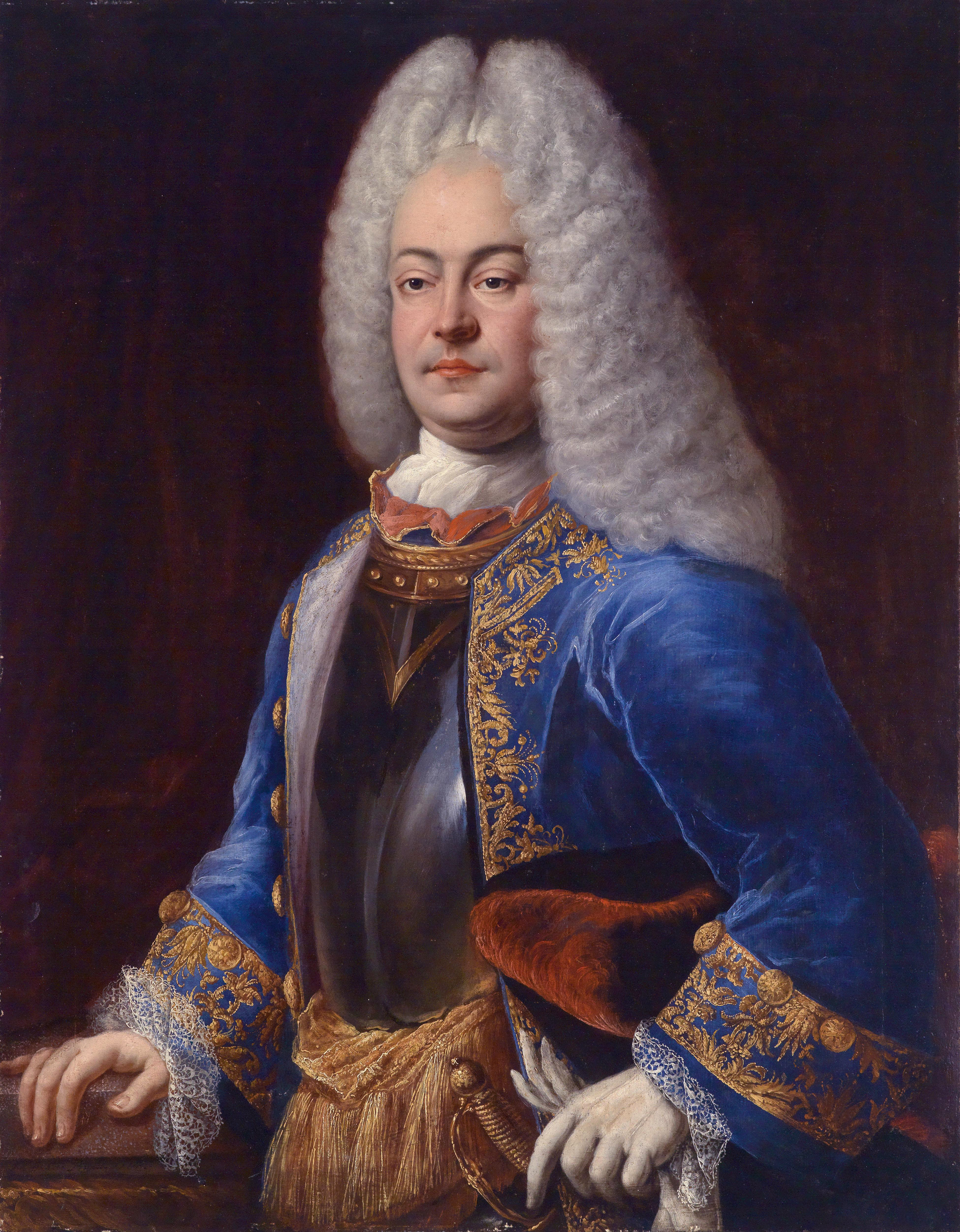
- George Albert, Prince of East Frisia (1708-1734)
| Date | 1726–1727 |
| Location | County of East Frisia |
| Result | Prince George Albert wins a Pyrrhic victory. |

Belligerents
| Princely faction: Amt Aurich; Amt Norden; Amt Berum; Amt Stickhausen; Amt Friedeburg; City of Aurich; City of Norden | Estatist faction: Amt Emden; Amt Leer; Amt Greetsiel; City of Emden |

Commanders and leaders
| George Albert of East Frisia; Enno Rudolph Brenneysen | Heinrich Bernhard von Appelle |

Strength
| Unknown | Unknown |

Casualties and losses
| Unknown | Unknown |

The Appeal War (properly: Apelle War) was a conflict between Prince George Albert of East Frisia and the Estates of East Frisia about the authority to raise taxes, so properly speaking, it should be classified as a civil war. It was named after Heinrich Bernhard von dem Appelle. Heinrich Bernard was one of the leaders of the rebellious faction, who were called the renitents. He owned the Groß Midlum manor in Krummhörn and was the administrator of the chamber of knights in the Estates of East Frisia.

== Background ==
There had been violent confrontations for decades between the Counts and later Princes of East Frisia and the Estates, in particular the City of Emden. There were many disputes, mostly about taxation, responsibilities for various issues, and property rights. Some disputes had been resolved by compromises, such as the Agreement of the Hague and the Agreement of Osterhusen. In the early 18th century, there were fresh tensions between the Prince and a "disobedient" faction of the Estate known as the renitent faction. The trigger was the Christmas flood of 1717, which caused widespread destruction in coastal parts of the principality. The county was deeply divided on the question of who should finance the necessary repairs. Both the Prince and the Estates had set up a fund to finance the repairs, and both sides claimed to have the authority to raise a special tax to fill these funds.

== War ==
On 28 April 1724, the city of Emden called on its possession Oldersum to prepare for war and arm themselves. On 2 February 1726, troops from Emden fought a battle in Leer against the princely troops. The latter were victorious. Soon afterward, the renitent faction was condemned in an imperial decree. The conflict, however, continued and on 7 April 1726, another battle was fought in the streets of Leer, killing and wounding many soldiers. In April 1727, the Prince called in reinforcements from Denmark. A group of 60 men from Oldersum united with troops from Emden and other localities in the Emden area and marched to Norden, where they lost another battle against the Prince's army. Another imperial decree again condemned the renitent faction and ordered them to pay reparations. The Prince took over the administration of Oldersum from the city of Emden, and imperial troops occupied the castle at Oldersum. When the conflict ended, the Prince emerged victoriously and the recalcitrant city of Emden had to submit to him. However, the Prince had won a Pyrrhic victory.

== Aftermath ==
The Appeal war had a significant impact on the subsequent history of East Frisia and the annexation by Prussia a few years later. The poor negotiating skills of Enno Rudolph Brenneysen, Prince George Albert's chancellor, prevented a peaceful settlement of the conflict. Although the Prince and his chancellor demanded that the renitents be punished severely, the Emperor pardoned the rebels in 1732. George Albert died on 11 June 1734 and his son Charles Edzard inherited the principality. However, Charles Edzard also found himself unable to resolve the conflict.

Around this time, East Frisia began to prepare for the Prussian annexation. After the Appeal war, the city of Emden found itself politically isolated and economically weakened. It aimed to regain its position as the county seat and commercial center and in 1740, Emden decided to seek Prussian assistance to achieve this goal. The city wanted to protect its economic position and sought Prussian acknowledgement of its existing privileges. In return, the Estates would recognize Prussia's right to annex the county. On 14 March 1744, two treaties were concluded on economic matters. Prussia mainly relied on its right to take over if the Cirksena family failed to produce a male heir, which had been granted to Prussia by Emperor Leopold I in 1694. Despite objections from the Kingdom of Hanover, King Frederick II of Prussia annexed East Frisia in 1744, after the last Cirksena prince died.
