= Amt Stickhausen =

Amt Stickhausen Amt Stickhausen (German)
- Amt of East Frisia
- 1464–1807
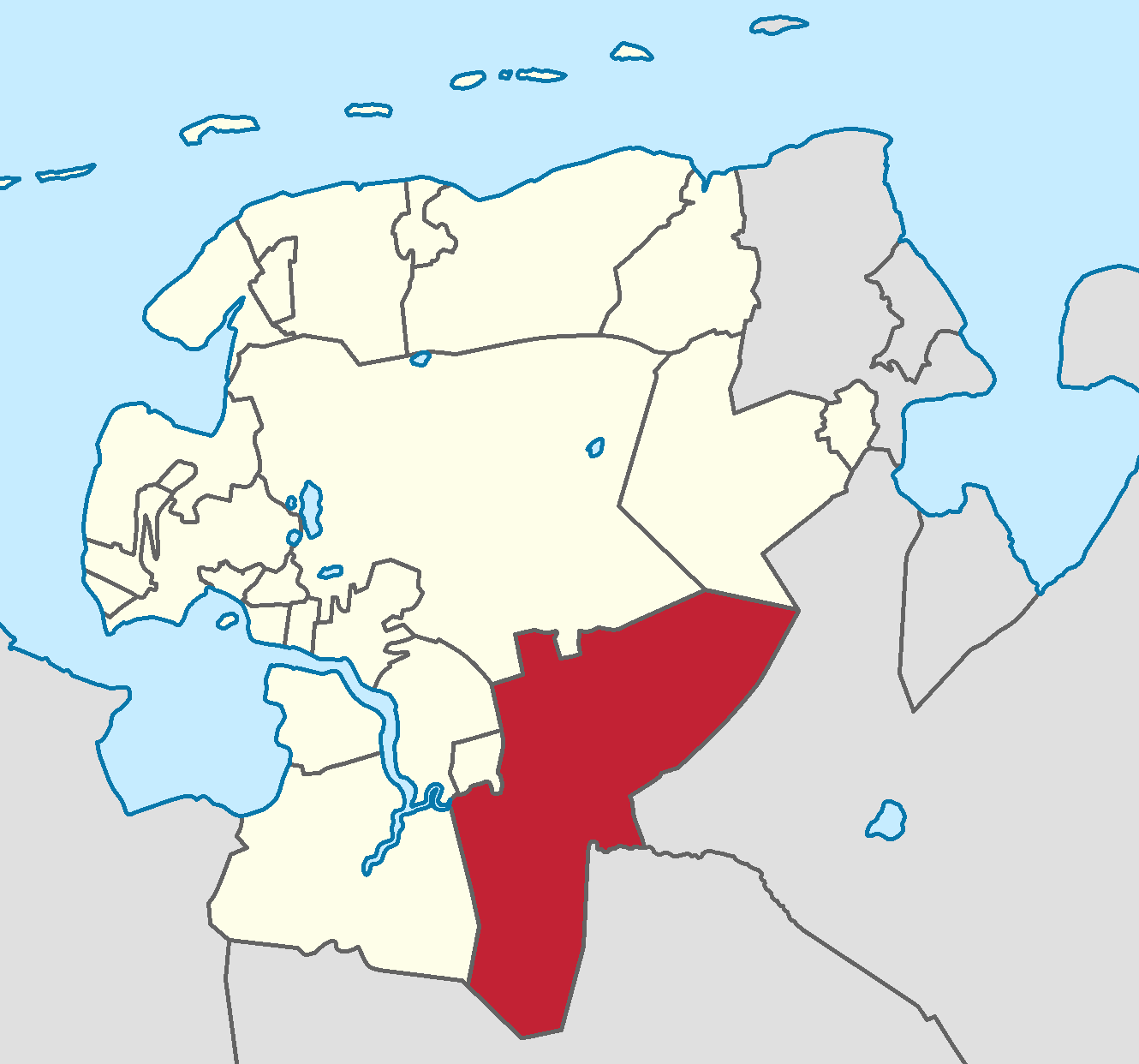
- Amt Stickhausen (red), within the County of East Frisia (beige) in the year 1728
- Capital: Stickhausen
- Population
  - 1752: 4,749
  - 1789: 7,583
  - 1805: 9,299
- History
  - Established: 1464
  - Incorporation of Amt Lengen: 1535
  - Disestablished: 1807
Preceded by
Overledingerland
Moormerland
Lengenerland
Succeeded by
Kingdom of Holland
- Today part of: Germany

Amt Stickhausen was one of the administrative districts (Ämter) of the County of East Frisia and, after 1654, of the Principality of East Frisia. Named after Stickhausen Castle (Burg Stickhausen), it served as an administrative district of the House of Cirksena throughout the early modern period. The Amt occupied the south-eastern part of East Frisia and comprised the Vogtei Filsum and the Vogtei Backemoor. In 1535, the former district of (Up-)Lengen was incorporated into the Amt, becoming a permanent part of its territory. The Amt remained in existence until the administrative reforms of the Kingdom of Holland in 1808, when it was replaced by the Arrondissement Stickhausen.

== History ==
=== Origins ===
The origins of the Amt Stickhausen were closely connected with Stickhausen Castle, from which the district derived its name. By the beginning of the sixteenth century the castle had already become one of the principal frontier fortresses of the County of East Frisia. At the outbreak of the Saxon Feud, Count Edzard I of East Frisia strengthened the fortress and had it reinforced with a large defensive tower, demonstrating its strategic importance for the defence of the south-eastern frontier of the county.

=== Saxon Feud ===
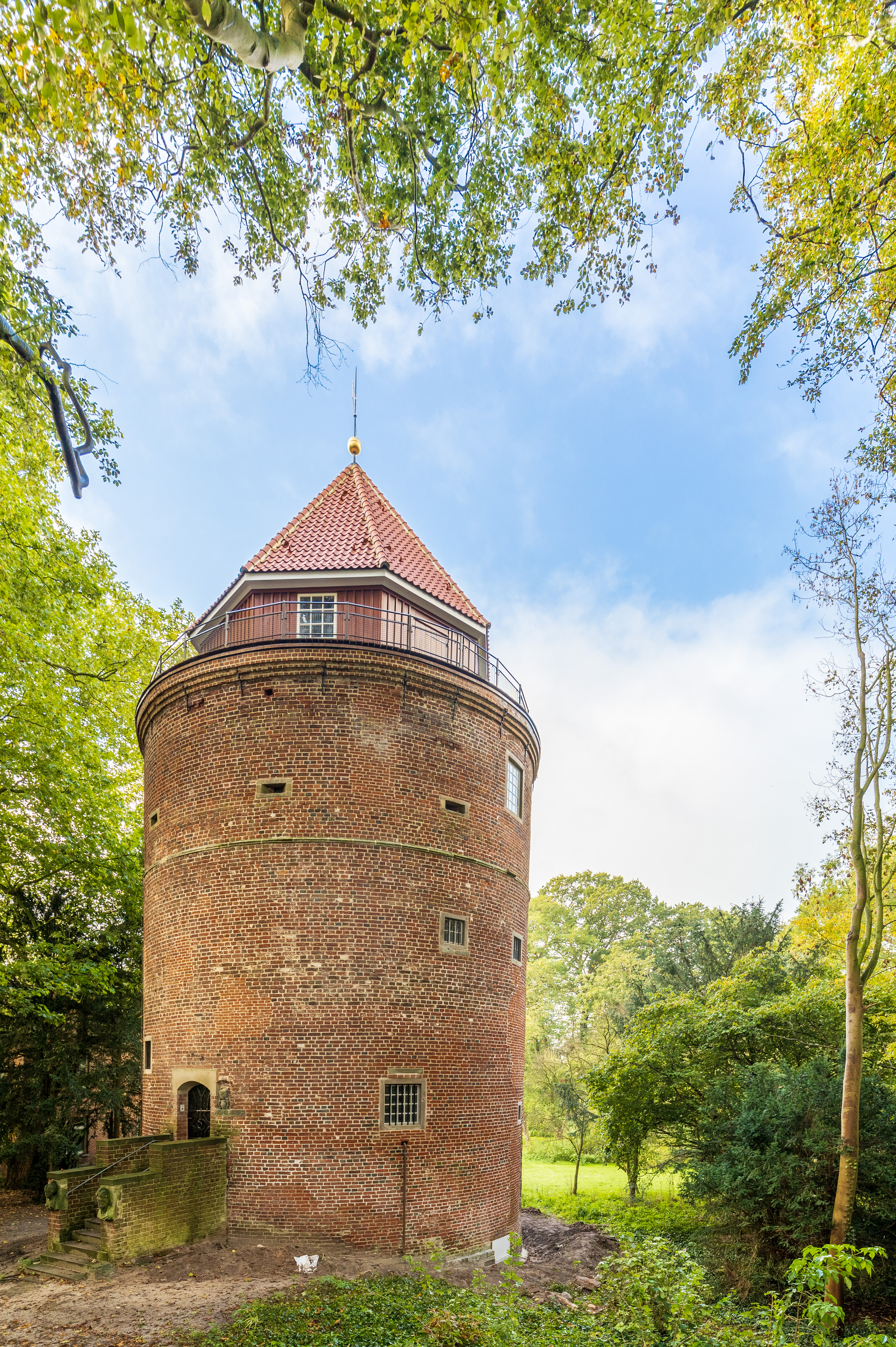
Burg Stickhausen

The Saxon Feud marked the first major conflict in which Stickhausen assumed a prominent role. After Aurich had been burned to the ground in May 1514, Duke Henry IV of Brunswick-Lüneburg decided not to besiege the strongly fortified castle of Aurich. Instead, the allied forces marched towards Stickhausen, whose capture would secure control over the south-western approaches to East Frisia. Before the war, Count Edzard I had strengthened the fortress and provided it with a substantial tower. The allied army established two camps before the castle: the ducal troops encamped near Filsum, while the contingents from Oldenburg, Harlingerland and Jever occupied positions near Detern. From these camps the fortress was attacked from both sides and subjected to heavy artillery fire. According to the account preserved by Eggerik Beninga, the defenders successfully resisted several assaults before the attackers threatened to force captive women and children into the moat during a final assault. The garrison subsequently negotiated terms that allowed it to withdraw with its arms before surrendering the fortress on 27 May 1514. Following the capture of Stickhausen, the allied army advanced against Uplengen, which capitulated shortly afterwards. When the main invading force withdrew from East Frisia, permanent garrisons remained in the captured fortresses, ensuring continued allied control over these strategic positions. After returning from Groningen later that year, Count Edzard attempted to recover the fortress. Together with Ulrich of Dornum, he invested Stickhausen and sought to force its surrender by blockade. The siege formed part of Edzard's wider campaign to regain the fortresses lost during the invasion. Although Edzard I failed to recapture Stickhausen by force in 1514, the fortress did not remain permanently in Brunswick hands. After Uplengen and Friedeburg had been surrendered, Stickhausen remained the only East Frisian fortress still occupied by the dukes of Brunswick. As the maintenance of the isolated stronghold proved costly and Edzard had meanwhile been reconciled with the Emperor, negotiations were resumed. The resulting Treaty of Zetel, concluded on 3 December, provided for the restoration of Stickhausen to Count Edzard. In return, he agreed to restore the artillery and ammunition captured at Stickhausen and Friedeburg and to pay 8,000 Rhenish guilders as compensation.

=== The struggle between Edzard II and Johan II ===
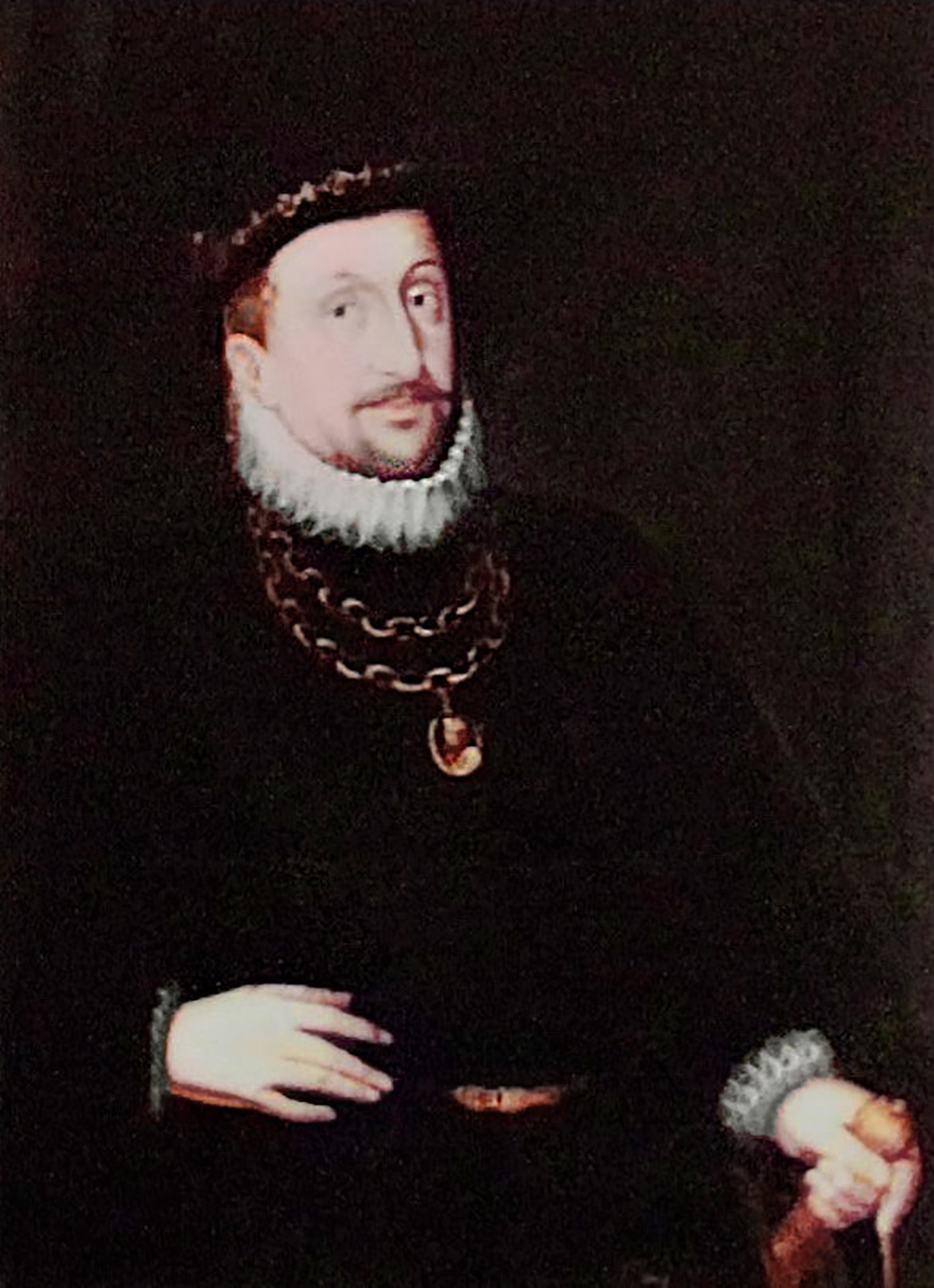
Edzard II, Count of East Frisia

The Amt Stickhausen again assumed an important role during the dynastic conflict between Count Edzard II and his younger brother Count Johan II, which divided East Frisia during the late sixteenth century. Stickhausen became one of the principal points of contention in the negotiations concerning the partition of authority within the county. Following prolonged mediation by imperial commissioners, an agreement was reached that was confirmed by Emperor Rudolf II on 10 February 1589. Under the terms of the imperial decree, Count Johan was to retain possession of the Ämter of Leer, Greetsiel, and Stickhausen for the remainder of his lifetime. In return, Count Edzard II was required to vacate these districts and to pay his brother an annual sum of 2,000 thalers from the revenues of the Emden tolls. The decree further provided for the establishment of a common treasury and a Hofgericht, while future Landtage were to be convened jointly in the names of both brothers. Although the settlement temporarily resolved the territorial dispute, its implementation proved difficult. According to Onno Klopp, Edzard delayed carrying out the agreement, and the political situation within the county remained largely unchanged for some time after the imperial decree had been issued. The arrangement came to an end with the death of Count Johan in 1591. Upon receiving news of his brother's death, Count Edzard travelled personally to Stickhausen and took possession of the fortress. With Johan's death, the Ämter of Leer, Greetsiel, and Stickhausen returned to the direct administration of the ruling count, restoring the territorial unity of the county under Edzard II.

=== Wars of the seventeenth century ===
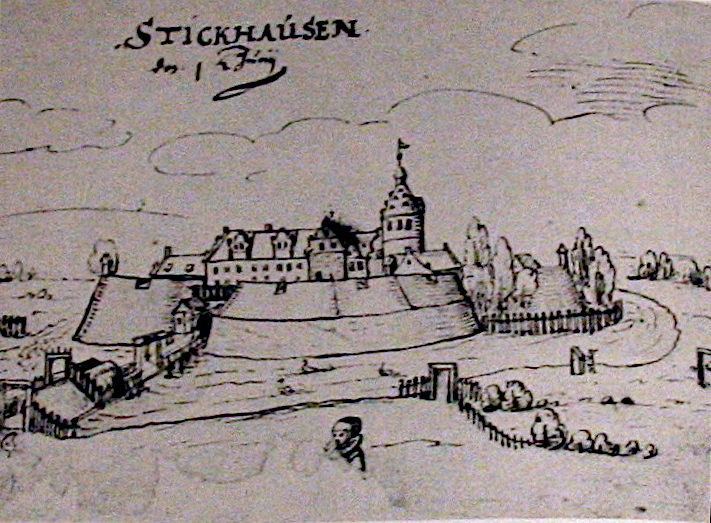
Stickhausen Castle in 1632

Throughout the seventeenth century, Stickhausen Castle remained one of the principal frontier fortresses of East Frisia. Owing to its strategic position on the south-eastern border of the county, the fortress repeatedly served as a military stronghold during periods of political instability and foreign intervention. During the Mansfeld invasion of 1622–1624, the fortress formed part of the defensive network occupied by foreign troops. After the withdrawal of the Mansfeld forces in 1624, the fortresses of Esens, Wittmund, Greetsiel, Friedeburg, and Stickhausen were reoccupied by garrisons of the East Frisian Estates. These garrisons remained in place to secure the county against renewed military threats.

The strategic importance of Stickhausen again became apparent during the growing tensions with the Prince-Bishopric of Münster. In 1671, Drost Eck, commander of the fortress, warned of the danger of a surprise attack. At the request of Princess Christine Charlotte, the garrison was reinforced with forty-five soldiers from Emden. Shortly afterwards, the Estates of East Frisia approved a further reinforcement of the fortress and agreed to finance the repair and improvement of its fortifications from the provincial treasury. Military preparations continued during the following year. The garrison was further strengthened, while the fortifications were repaired in anticipation of a possible invasion. These measures reflected the continued military significance of Stickhausen as one of the principal defensive positions protecting East Frisia.

== Drosts and amtmen ==
=== Drosts ===
Term of office	Year of death	Name
1433*	–	Hoesche, Vogt
1466*	–	Reindsna (Reynda), Popko, Hauptmann zu Stickhausen, Vogt zu Detern
1473*–1486	1486	Haje (Haye, Hayo), gen. "Lange Haye"
1493*–1511*	–	Loringa, Otto Papen
1514, 1515*	–	Beer, Warner, Drost zu Stickhausen, Knipens und Friedeburg
1520*–1533	–	Baerts, Wendel (Houtrouw I, p. 177)
1554–1564*	–	von Lengen (von Frese), Bolo (Bohle, Boel, Daale, Doale)
1587*	1570	von Lengen, Bernd
1587*	–	Drile, Casper, Drost (Abel Eppens II, p. 578; probably identical with Amtmann Caspar von Viele, 1585*?; see below)
1590*	–	von Schaumburg, Jost (J. H. D. Möhlmann)
1591–1599	–	von Haseborg, Menno, Kommandant zu Stickhausen
1599 ff.	–	von Kittlitz (Kidlitz), Ernst
1604–1607 (?)	1609	Crumminga, Cirk
1607–1615	1636	von Hame sen., Jost
1619	1619	von Knyphausen, Dodo
–	–	Lorinça, Emo
1620	–	von Geldern, Geriet (Wiarda IV, p. 134)
1621 ff.–1637	1634	Hayunga, Ubben (Ulben), later Drost in Norden
1637	1637	von Hane jun., Jost
1637	1652	von Diepenbrock, Johann Franz, former Drost in Norden
1638–1647	–	Scheffert, Wilhelm, gen. Weiswyler (Wisweiler)
1648–1661	1666	von Wersabe, Gerd Hinrich
1661–1685	1696	von Eck, Michael, earlier Drost zu Friedeburg
1685–1693	1693	von Bruns, Heinrich Lambert, former Drost zu Friedeburg
1693–1724	1724	von Harling, Christian Ludwig Günther
1724–1754	1754	de Lamy du Pont, Charles

=== Amtmen ===
Term of office	Year of death	Name
1546*–1555*	1591	Aytken(s), Eilard (Eilardus Eilardi), Amtsschreiber, later Amtmann zu Berum
1583*–1588*	–	Schwarze (Swarte), Georg, former Amtmann and/or Amtsschreiber in Norden
1585*	–	von Viele, Caspar (Bartels IV, 3, p. 54; according to J. H. D. Möhlmann: active until after 1568; probably identical with Drost Caspar Drile?, 1587***)
(1589?), 1591*	ca. 1636	Huntel, Johann, Amtmann, former Secretary of Count Johann in Leerort
1592*	–	Cloppenburg, Hermann, Amtsschreiber, former Amtsschreiber in Aurich
1592 (?), before 1601	–	Harckens, Johann, Amtmann
1598*	–	von Grönen, Hermann, Amtmann
1606–1608	before 1620	Forstius (Vorstius), Nikolaus, 1611*–12* tax collector to Greetsiel
(1608)–1610	1612	Friese, Franz, until 1608 Amtmann in Emden
1615–1616	–	Gnaphaus, Albrecht (J. H. D. Möhlmann), then Amtmann in Berum
(1611–?), 1627*–1648	1680	Westenesch, Hermann, former Amtmann in Pewsum
before 1658	–	Ellebrecht, Eilhard, Dr., Amtmann, 1658 Swedish town bailiff of Bremen (J. H. D. Möhlmann)
1651–1653	–	Freitag, Johann Adolf, later Amtmann in Greetsiel
1655–1660	1660	Ludewig, Johann
1660–1676	1698	Bolenius, Christian, Dr., later Kanzlei- and Justizrat
1677–1680	–	Zernemann, Mathias, Dr.
1682–1686	1686	Bley, Heinrich, Dr.
1687–1694	–	Hüpeden, Bernhard
1694–1705	1705	Volcmarus, Georg Christian, Dr.
1705–1709	1709	Witkopp, Christian Hinrich
1709–1731	1740	Stürenburg, Johann Diedrich, Dr.
1731–1755	1755	Ortgiese, Ricklef Johann Gerhard, Dr.

An asterisk (*) indicates that the officeholder is attested in the sources for the specified year; however, the year does not necessarily mark the beginning or end of the individual's term of office.

== See also ==
- East Frisia
- East Frisia (peninsula)
- County of East Frisia
- History of East Frisia
