= Amt Leer =

Amt Leer Amt Leer (German)
- Amt of East Frisia
- 1464–1807
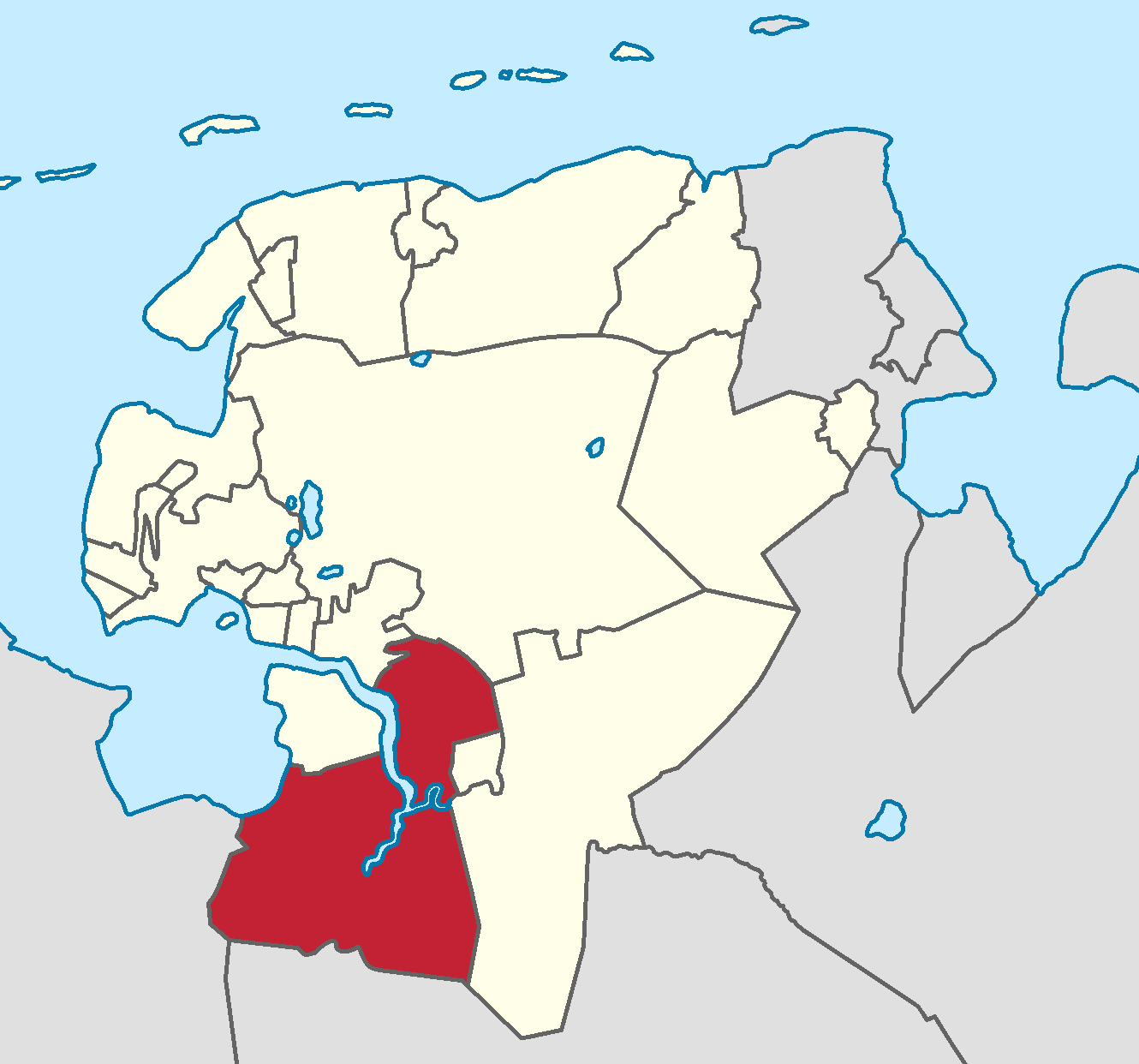
- Amt Leer (red), within the County of East Frisia (beige) in the year 1728
- Capital: Leerort (1464–1611); Leer (1611–1807)
- Population
  - 1751: 9,544
  - 1786: 12,770
  - 1805: 15,288
- History
  - Established: 1464
  - Relocation of the administrative seat to Leer: 1611
  - The Lordship of Loga is separated from Amt Leer: 1642
  - Disestablished: 1807
Preceded by
Rheiderland
Moormerland
Overledingerland
Succeeded by
Kingdom of Holland
- Today part of: Germany; Netherlands

Amt Leer was an administrative district (Ämter) of the County of East Frisia. Located in the south-western part of East Frisia, it was named after the town of Leer, while the fortress of Leerort originally served as its military and administrative centre until the Dutch takeover in 1611. During the early modern period, the Amt comprised the Vogteien of Leer, Bunde, Weener and Esklum. Owing to its strategic location on the lower Ems, the district played an important role in the political and military history of East Frisia until its abolition during the administrative reorganisation of 1808.

== History ==
=== Origins ===
The origins of Amt Leer can be traced to the territorial consolidation of the Cirksena dynasty during the mid-fifteenth century. In 1453, following an agreement with the city of Hamburg, Ulrich Cirksena regained possession of both Emden and the fortress of Leerort. After the transfer, he appointed Eggerik Beyenfleet as drost of Leerort, establishing the fortress as the administrative and military centre of the surrounding district.

After Ulrich Cirksena was elevated to the rank of Imperial Count in 1464, the territory under the House of Cirksena was gradually organised into a number of administrative districts centred on the principal castles of the county. Leerort became the seat of one of these districts. According to Onno Klopp, the division of the Cirksena territories into eight Ämter dates from the early period of comital rule and was based on the principal castles, including Leerort.

The Amt originally comprised the Vogteien of Leer (Moormer Vogtei), Bunde, Weener and Esklum. This administrative structure remained largely unchanged throughout the early modern period.

=== Saxon Feud ===
During the Saxon Feud, Amt Leer became one of the principal theatres of war in East Frisia. Owing to its strategic position at the confluence of the Leda and Ems, the fortress of Leerort served as one of Count Edzard I's principal strongholds and became the objective of the allies of George of Saxony.

In 1514, after overrunning large parts of East Frisia and capturing the fortresses of Stickhausen, Uplengen and Dornum, the allied army advanced on Leerort and laid siege to the fortress. The besieging force was commanded by Duke Henry IV of Brunswick-Lüneburg, who demanded its surrender. During the siege, however, Henry was struck by a shot fired from the fortress and was killed. His death forced the allied army to abandon the siege and withdraw from East Frisia, leaving only small garrisons in Friedeburg, Stickhausen and Dornum.

The successful defence of Leerort marked a turning point in the campaign. The fortress remained in comital hands for the remainder of the conflict and retained its importance as the principal military stronghold guarding the south-western frontier of East Frisia. After the war, Count Enno II further strengthened its fortifications, while Eggerik Beninga, drost of Leerort, supervised the construction of new defensive works around the fortress.

=== The struggle between Edzard II and Johan II ===
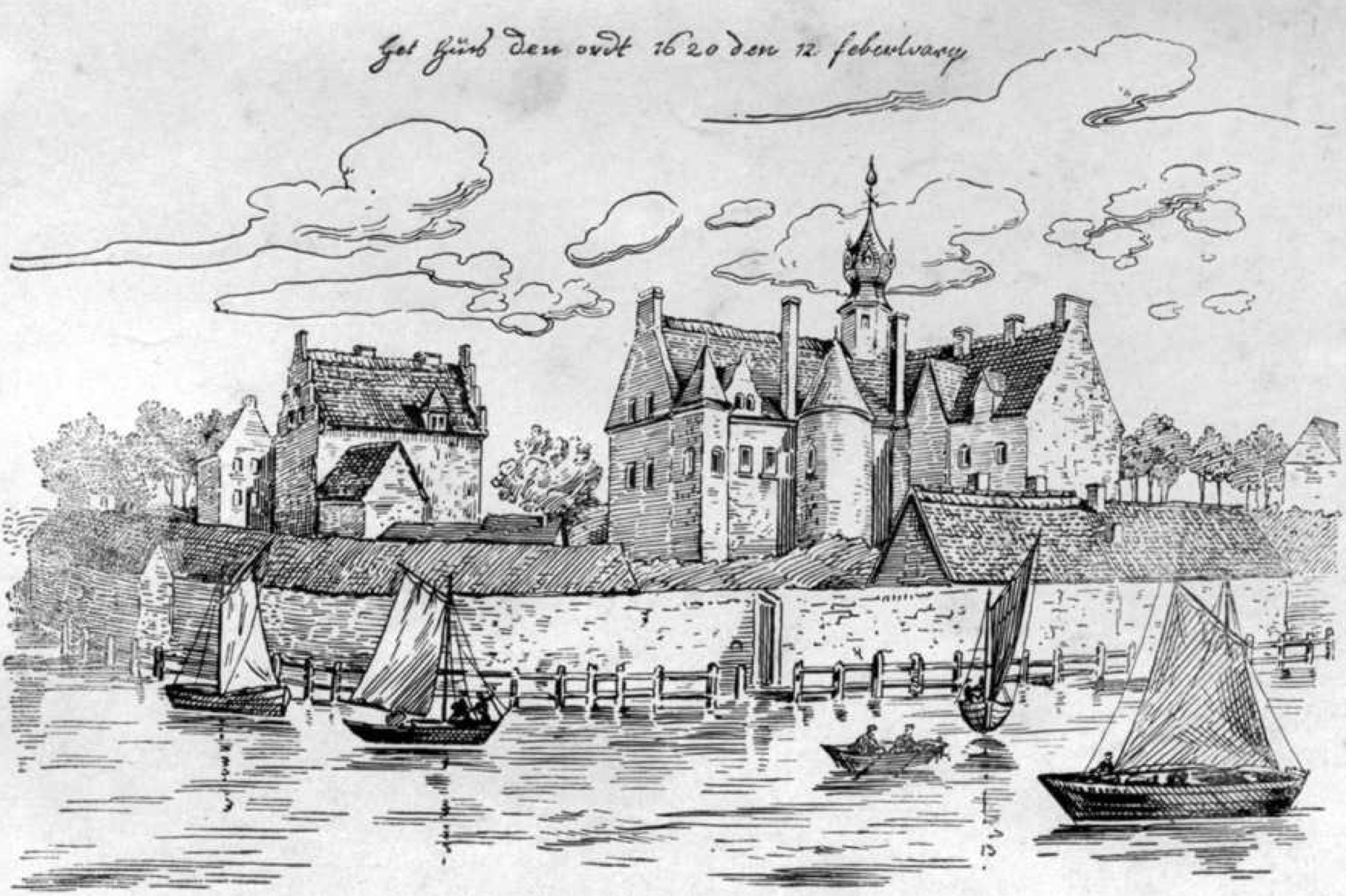
Fortress of Leerort in 1620

Following the death of Enno II in 1540, East Frisia was governed by his widow, Countess Anna of Oldenburg, as regent for her sons Edzard II, Christoph and Johan II. After Anna's death in 1561, the long-standing rivalry between Edzard II and his younger brother John II eventually resulted in the partition of the county. Under the agreement, John II received the Ämter of Greetsiel, Leer and Stickhausen, while Edzard II retained the other Ämter.

The partition proved unsuccessful and further weakened the authority of the House of Cirksena. Following the death of Johan II in 1591, Amt Leer reverted to the main comital line under Edzard II, restoring the district to the united County of East Frisia.

=== Dutch occupation of Leerort ===
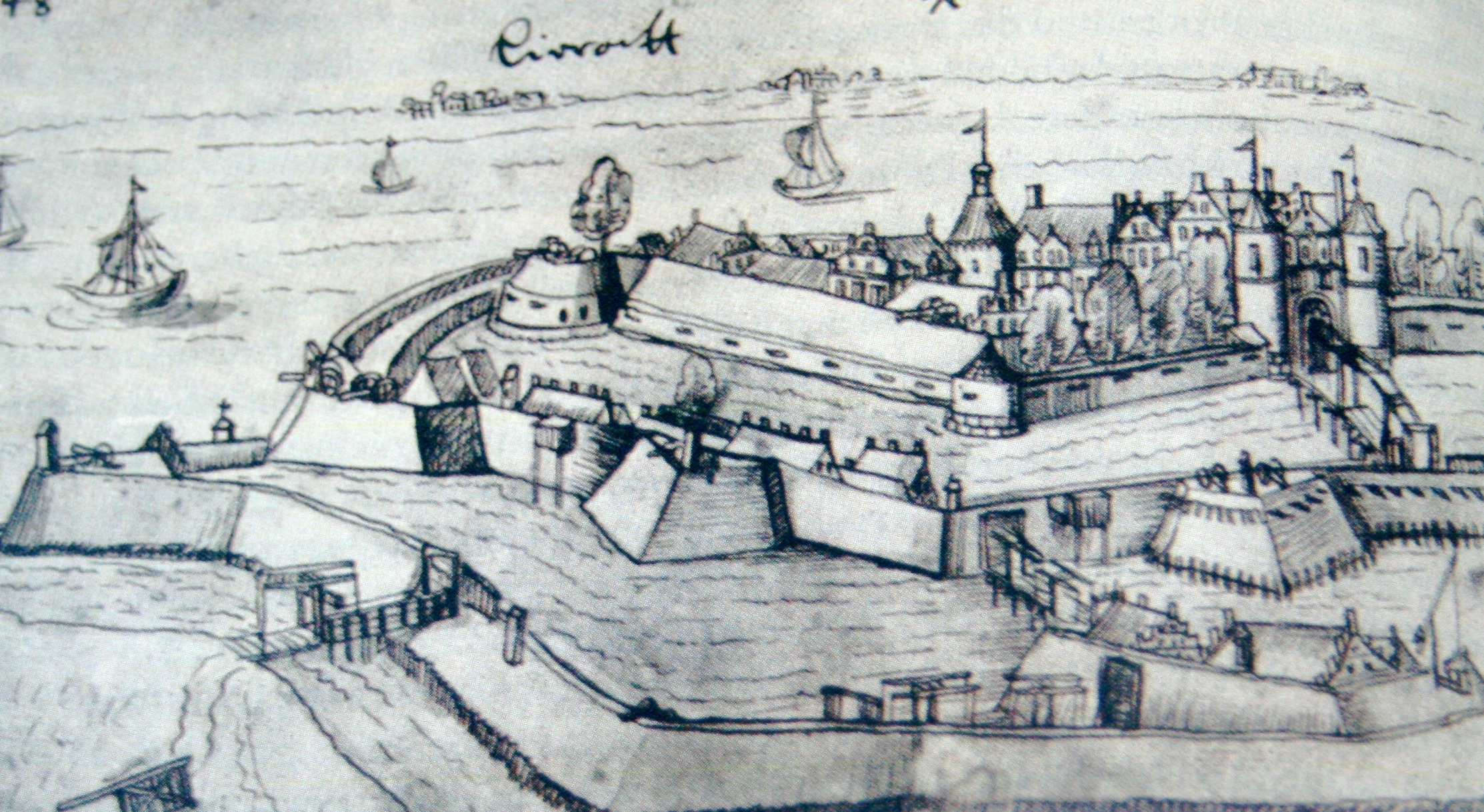
Fortress of Leerort in 1632

During the conflicts between Count Enno III and the city of Emden, the strategic importance of Leerort increased considerably. Under the Accord of Osterhusen in 1611, Count Enno III agreed to place the fortress of Leerort at the disposal of the States General of the Dutch Republic for a period of five years. A Dutch garrison subsequently occupied the fortress.

The agreed five-year occupation was repeatedly extended. Following the expiry of the Twelve Years' Truce with Spain in 1621, the States General refused to evacuate Leerort, arguing that the fortress remained essential for the defence of the Dutch Republic against a possible Spanish attack through East Frisia. Although the East Frisian counts repeatedly demanded the restoration of the fortress, the Dutch garrison remained in place throughout the Eighty Years' War and the Thirty Years' War.

Only after the extinction of the Cirksena dynasty and the Prussian annexation of East Frisia in 1744 did the States General agree to withdraw their troops. On 22 October 1744, the fortress of Leerort was formally handed over to Prussian forces under Captain von Haack, bringing more than a century of Dutch occupation to an end.

=== Prussian period ===
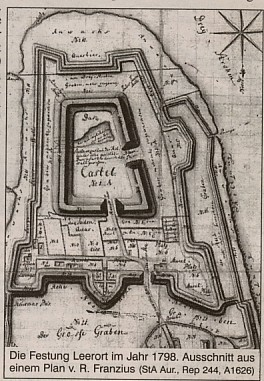
Fortress of Leerort in 1798

Following the incorporation of East Frisia into the Kingdom of Prussia in 1744, Amt Leer remained one of the administrative districts of the province. Although the fortress of Leerort was briefly occupied by a Prussian garrison after the withdrawal of the Dutch troops, its military importance rapidly declined. In 1749, the Prussian garrison was transferred to Emden, and thereafter no permanent military force was stationed at Leerort.

During the seventeenth and eighteenth century, the administrative centre of the district gradually shifted from the fortress of Leerort to the town of Leer, which increasingly developed as the principal seat of government, commerce and justice within the Amt. By the end of the Prussian period, Leer had effectively replaced Leerort as the administrative centre of the district.

== Drosts and amtmen ==
=== Drosts ===
Term of office	Year of death	Name
1432–1435–69*		Beyenfleet (Beyerfleeth), Eggerick
1475*		von Vorden, Hayo
1486*		von Lengen, Broder
1495*–1525		Hoytken (Haikena, Haykens), Sybo
1525–1533(?)		Beninga, Eggerick
1533*–1538*	1589	von Hoemen, Jürgen
1544*–1556(?)	1562	Frese, Klaes
1556–1561	1591	Beninga, Eggerick
1561–1572		Friese (Frese), Ocko Remetz
1573*		Frese, Klaes
1585*–1589		von Kiesleben, State (Statius)
1589–1591		von der Wenghe, Caspar
1591–1594		Wilken, Johann
1594–1617	1617	von Wersabe, Ortgiese
1618–1629(?), 1621(?)	1621(?)	Coenders van Helpen, Wilhelm
(1621?)–1630	1637	von Frydag zu Gödens, Haro
1631–1650	1652	von Frydag zu Gödens, Franz Ico
1650–1660	1660	Meckama, Frh. von Aylva, Heßel
1660–1690	1691	Meckama, Frh. von Aylva, Hans Wilhelm
1691–1696	1696	von Eck, Michael
1697–1725	1725	von Imhof, Wilhelm Heinrich, Frh.
1727–1761	1761	von Frydag zu Gödens, Franz Heinrich

=== Amtmen ===
Term of office	Year of death	Name
1486*, 1489*, 1496*		Egbertus
1503–1518		Emmen (Emmius), Ubbe, Mag.
1518		Thomas
1518–1528		Jelricus (Oelricus)
1528–1534(?)		Sandtkoper (Sampker), Hermanus, Mag.
1538–1540*		Brunger, Ewen (Ewynge?)
1539*		Vlaskoper, Otto
1540–1545	1545	(von) Lengen, Johannes
1545(?)–1580		Gansenebe, gen. Harderwyk, Dirk
1580–1582	1599	Slüter, Alricus, Lic.
1582–1588*		Gansenebe, gen. Harderwyk, Dirk
1588–1591		Ackema, Rembert, Dr.
1591–1594		Elth (van Elthen), Alting, Johann
1594–1597		Wilken, Johann
1597–1614		Harsebroek, Caspar
1614–1623		Strüvinga, Helmerus
1623–1627	1627	Wiarda, Agge(a)eus
1628–1642	1642	Wiarda, Tileman
1642–1670	1674	Wiarda, Bucho, Dr.
1670–1682	1682	Wiarda, Ulrich
1682–1689	1689	Besen, Philipp Christian
1689–1715	1715	Rösing, Johann, Dr.
1715–1753	1753	Kettler, Stephan Rudolf, Dr.

An asterisk (*) indicates that the officeholder is attested in the sources for the specified year; however, the year does not necessarily mark the beginning or end of the individual's term of office.

== See also ==
- East Frisia
- East Frisia (peninsula)
- County of East Frisia
- History of East Frisia
