= Enno August of East Frisia =

Enno August
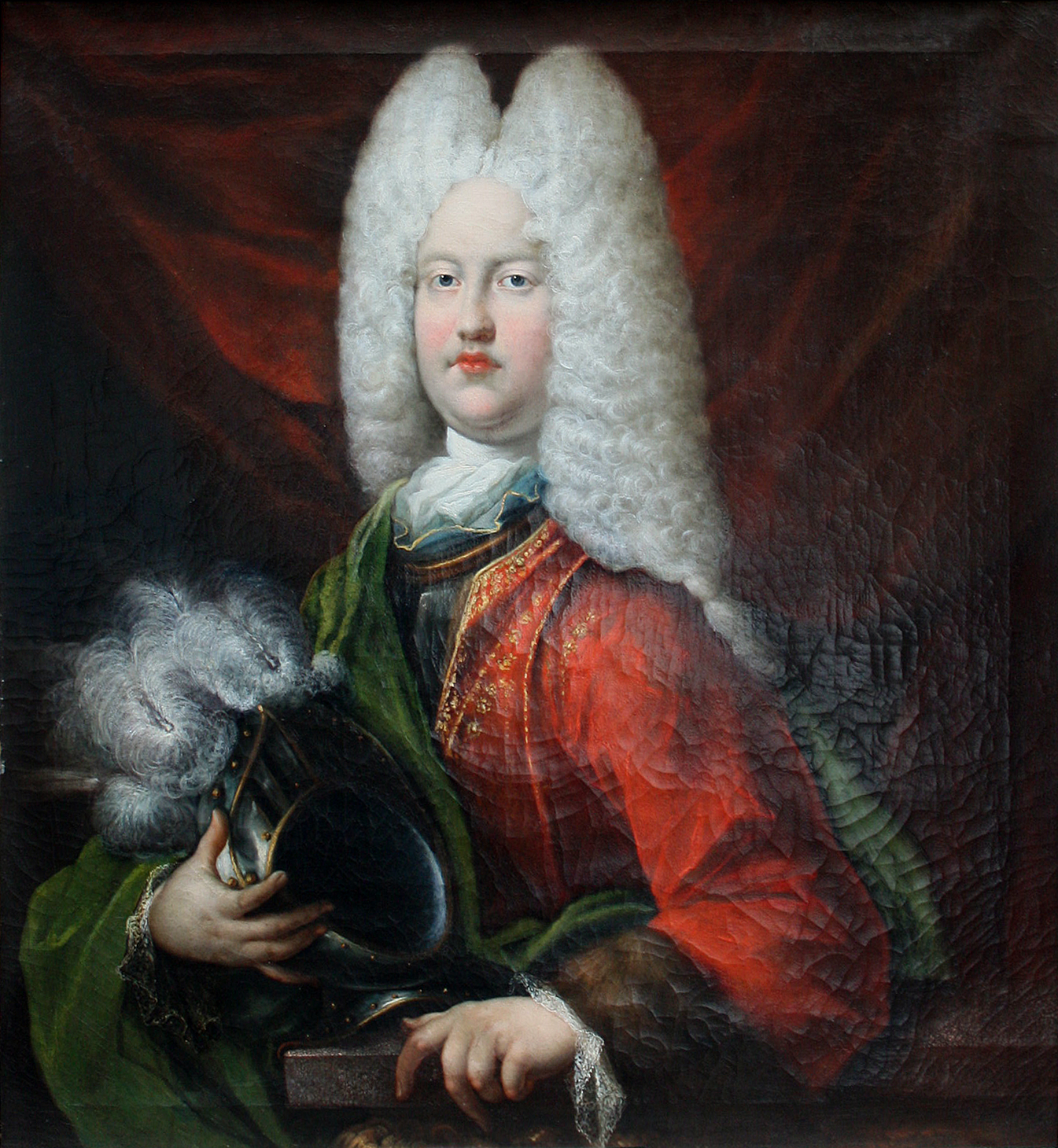
- Enno August, Prince of East Frisia (Johann Conrad Eichler, 1717)
- Born: 13 February 1697
- Died: 3 August 1725 (aged 28)
- House: Cirksena
- Father: Christian Everhard of East Frisia
- Mother: Eberhadine Sophie of Oettingen-Oettingen
- Religion: Lutheranism

Enno August of East Frisia (13 February 1697 – 3 August 1725) was an East Frisian prince of the House of Cirksena. He was the youngest son of Christian Eberhard, Prince of East Frisia, and was educated at the Rudolph Antoniana academy in Wolfenbüttel between 1708 and 1711 under the supervision of his court tutor, Christian Wilhelm von Münnich. He subsequently travelled extensively, including visits to the Dutch Republic, France and various German states.

After returning to East Frisia in 1716, Enno August frequently accompanied his elder brother, George Albert, Prince of East Frisia, on his travels. In 1719 he went to Oettingen, where his uncle obtained for him a commission as a colonel in the troops of the Swabian Circle. The following year, he was awarded the Order of Saint Hubert by the Duke of Württemberg. In 1723, with the approval of the Swabian Circle, he became commander of the Oettingen Dragoon Regiment.

Enno August's health had already begun to deteriorate by 1723. Nevertheless, he travelled to Swabia to take personal command of his regiment. He returned to East Frisia in 1724, where his health continued to decline. He died on 3 August 1725 at the age of 28. East Frisian historian Wiarda described him as a learned man of agreeable character and noble disposition, stating that these qualities had earned him widespread affection and esteem.

== Early life and education ==
=== Childhood ===
Enno August was born on 13 February 1697 as the youngest son of Christian Eberhard, Prince of East Frisia. He was the fifth surviving son of Christian Eberhard's first marriage. His elder brothers were Leopold Ignatius, George Albert, Frederick Ulrich and Charles Enno. Charles Enno, who had attended the gymnasium at Wolfenbüttel together with Enno August, died in 1709 after returning to Aurich because of ill health.

=== Education in Wolfenbüttel ===
In 1708, Enno August went to Wolfenbüttel, where he attended the Rudolph-Antoniana. Under the supervision of his court tutor, Christian Wilhelm von Münnich, he studied there until 1711 and laid the foundations for his further education. His education took place alongside that of his elder brother Charles Enno.

=== Planned studies in Leiden ===
In May 1711, Enno August was preparing to continue his education at the Academy of Leiden. He was to travel there accompanied by the learned Heinrich von Bünau, who had by then become his court tutor. Before the journey could begin, however, news arrived that a French privateer had captured the equipment and baggage that had been sent ahead by ship. A convoy from Haarlem subsequently recaptured the prize from the privateer, but a considerable part of the equipment had been lost. As a result of the incident, Enno August was forced to postpone his departure until 8 July 1711.

== Travels ==
=== Paris and France ===
In the summer of 1715, Enno August travelled to Paris. Wiarda does not provide further details about the purpose or duration of his stay in Paris, but the journey formed part of his continued education and travels abroad.

=== Return to East Frisia ===
In April 1716, Enno August began his return journey through Lorraine. At Idstein, he encountered his elder brother, the reigning Prince George Albert of East Frisia. The two brothers subsequently travelled together and arrived in Aurich on 2 August 1716. Following his return, Enno August remained in East Frisia and frequently accompanied George Albert on his travels. He remained closely connected to his brother's court until he travelled to Oettingen in 1719, marking the beginning of his military career.

== Military career ==
=== Service in the Swabian Circle ===
In 1719, Enno August travelled to Oettingen. His uncle, the reigning Prince of Oettingen, secured for him a commission as a colonel in the troops of the Swabian Circle. In the following year, Enno August was awarded the Order of Saint Hubert by the Duke of Württemberg. Wiarda records that his military position continued to develop during the following years, eventually leading to his appointment to command a regiment.

== Final years and death ==
In 1723, with the approval of the Swabian Circle, Enno August received the Oettingen Dragoon Regiment. By this time, however, his health had already begun to deteriorate. Despite his declining health, he considered himself capable of travelling to Swabia in order to take personal command of his regiment. He subsequently returned to East Frisia in 1724. His condition subsequently continued to worsen, and he became increasingly weak. August Enno died on 3 August 1725.

== Ancestors ==
Ancestors of Enno August of East Frisia

16. Enno III, Count of East Frisia
8. Ulrich II, Count of East Frisia
17. Anna of Holstein-Gottorp
4. George Christian, Prince of East Frisia
18. Louis V, Landgrave of Hesse-Darmstadt
9. Juliana of Hesse-Darmstadt
19. Magdalene of Brandenburg
2. Christian Everhard, Prince of East Frisia
20. John Frederick, Duke of Württemberg (= 28)
10. Eberhard III, Duke of Württemberg (= 14)
21. Barbara Sophie of Brandenburg (= 29)
5. Christine Charlotte of Württemberg
22. John Casimir, Wild- and Rhinegrave of Salm-Kyrburg (=30)
11. Anna Catherine, Wild- and Rhinegravine of Salm-Kyrburg (= 15)
23. Dorothea of Solms-Laubach (= 31)
1. Enno August, Prince of East Frisia
24. Louis Eberhard, Count of Oettingen-Oettingen
12. Joachim Ernest of Oettingen-Oettingen
25. Margaret of Erbach
6. Albert Ernest I of Oettingen-Oettingen
26. Kraft of Hohenlohe-Neuenstein
13. Anna Dorothea of Hohenlohe-Neuenstein-Gleichen
27. Sophie of Birkenfeld
3. Eberhardine Sophie of Oettingen-Oettingen
28. John Frederick, Duke of Württemberg (= 20)
14. Eberhard III, Duke of Württemberg (= 10)
29. Barbara Sophie of Brandenburg (= 21)
7. Christine Friederike of Württemberg
30. John Casimir, Wild- and Rhinegrave of Salm-Kyrburg (= 22)
15. Anna Catherine, Wild- and Rhinegravine of Salm-Kyrburg (= 11)
31. Dorothea of Solms-Laubach (= 23)
