= Anna Catharina of Salm-Kyrburg =

Anna Catharina Dorothea of Salm-Kyrburg
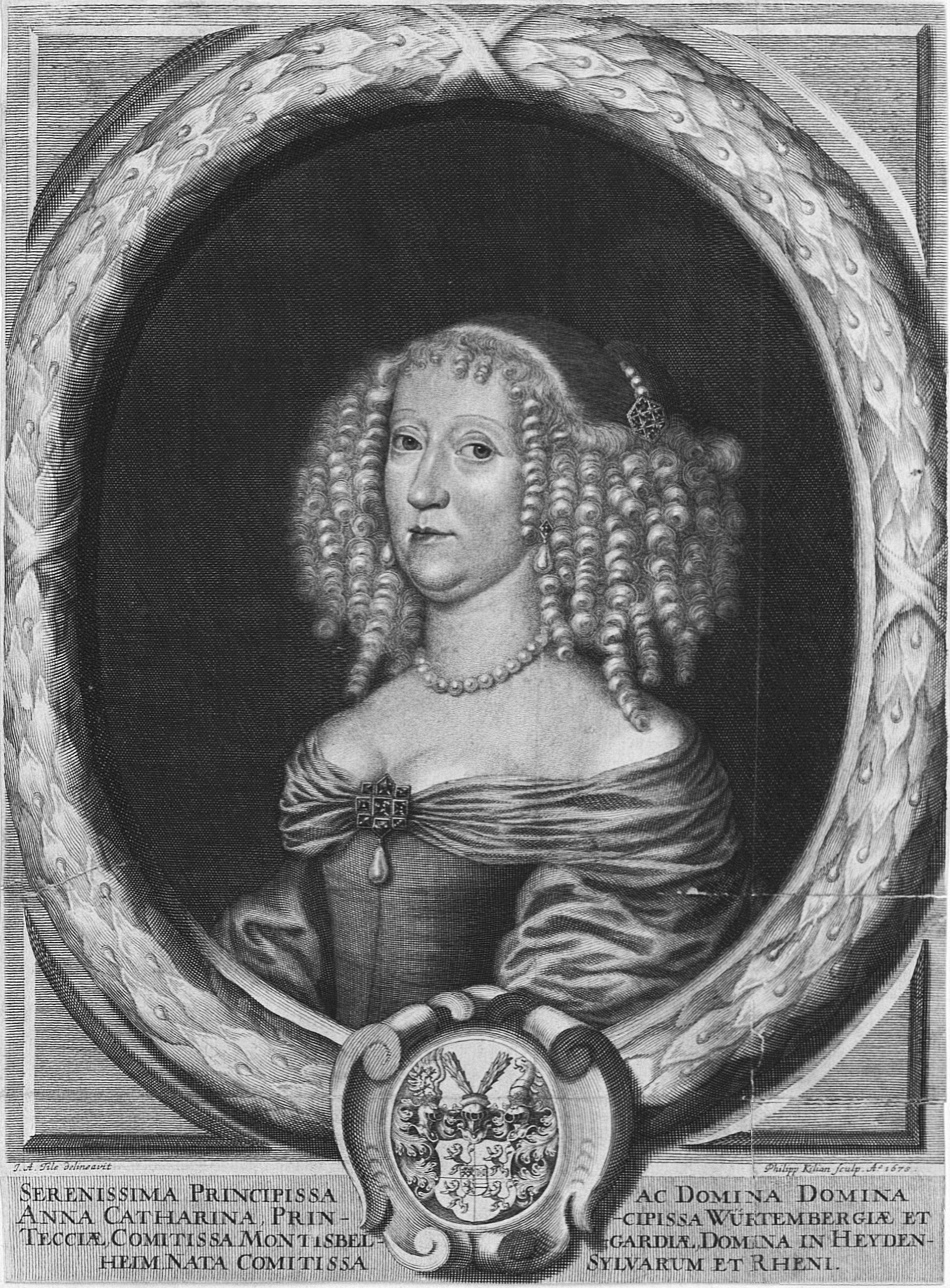

Duchess consort of Württemberg
- Tenure: 26 February 1637 – 27 June 1655
- Born: 6 January 1614
- Died: 27 June 1655 (aged 41); Stuttgart, Germany
- Burial: Stiftskirche (Stuttgart)
- Spouse: Eberhard III, Duke of Württemberg
- Issue among others…: Sophie Luise of Württemberg; Christine Charlotte of Württemberg; William Louis, Duke of Württemberg; Frederick Charles, Duke of Württemberg-Winnental
- House: House of Salm
- Father: John Casimir, Wildgrave and Rhinegrave of Salm-Kyrburg
- Mother: Dorothea of Solms-Laubach

Anna Catharina Dorothea of Salm-Kyrburg (6 January 1614 – 27 June 1655) was a German noblewoman who became Duchess of Württemberg through her marriage to Eberhard III, Duke of Württemberg.

== Early life ==
Anna Katharina Dorothea was born on 6 January 1614 as the daughter of John Casimir, Wildgrave and Rhinegrave of Salm-Kyrburg, and Countess Dorothea of Solms-Laubach. Her family belonged to the high nobility of the Holy Roman Empire, with strong ties to other German princely houses.

== Marriage and issue ==
On 26 February 1637, Anna Katharina Dorothea married Eberhard III, Duke of Württemberg, one of the rulers in southwestern Germany during the Thirty Years' War. The marriage strengthened ties between the Salm-Kyrburg family and the Duchy of Württemberg.

Anna Katharina Dorothea was constantly pregnant during much of her marriage, giving birth almost once a year. Many of her children played important roles in European nobility:

- John Frederick of Württemberg-Stuttgart (9 September 1637 – 2 August 1659).
- Louis Frederick of Württemberg-Stuttgart (2 November 1638 – 18 January 1639), died in infancy.
- Christian Eberhard of Württemberg-Stuttgart (29 November 1639 – 23 March 1640), died in infancy.
- Eberhard of Württemberg-Stuttgart (12 December 1640 – 24 February 1641), died in infancy.
- Sophie Louise of Württemberg-Stuttgart (19 February 1642 – 3 October 1702); married on 8 February 1671 to Christian Ernst, Margrave of Brandenburg-Bayreuth.
- Dorothea Amalie of Württemberg-Stuttgart (13 February 1643 – 27 March 1650), died in childhood.
- Christine Friederike of Württemberg-Stuttgart (28 February 1644 – 30 October 1674); married on 28 May 1665 to Prince Albert Ernest I of Oettingen-Oettingen and had issue, among which was the Duchess consort of Brunswick-Lüneburg.
- Christine Charlotte of Württemberg-Stuttgart (21 October 1645 – 16 May 1699), married 8 May 1662 to Prince George Christian, Prince of East Frisia.
- Duke William Louis of Württemberg (7 January 1647 – 23 June 1677).
- Anna Katharine of Württemberg-Stuttgart (27 November 1648 – 10 November 1691).
- Karl Christof of Württemberg-Stuttgart (28 January 1650 – 2 June 1650), died in infancy.
- Eberhardine Katharine of Württemberg-Stuttgart (12 April 1651 – 19 August 1683); married on 30 April 1682 her brother in law, Prince Albert Ernest I of Oettingen-Oettingen.
- Duke Frederick Charles of Württemberg-Winnental (September 1652 – December 1698), an ancestor of future dukes and kings of Württemberg.
- Karl Maximilian of Württemberg-Stuttgart (28 September 1654 – 9 January 1689).

== Death and burial ==
Anna Katharina Dorothea died on 27 June 1655 in Stuttgart, the capital of Württemberg. She was buried in the Stiftskirche in Stuttgart, the traditional burial place of Württemberg's ducal family.

== See also ==
- House of Salm
- Duchy of Württemberg
