= Juliana Luise von Ostfriesland =

German noblewoman

Juliana Luise von Ostfriesland (1698–1740) was a German noblewoman, Princess of Ostfriesland by birth, and the Duchess of Schleswig-Holstein-Sonderburg-Plön by marriage.

== Early life ==
Born into the ruling House of Cirksena, Juliana Luise was the ninth child and fourth daughter of Christian Everhard, Prince of East Frisia and Princess Eberhardine Sophie of Oettingen-Oettingen.

== Court life in Russia ==
During her youth, she was chosen by her cousin Charlotte Christine of Brunswick-Lüneburg to be her Ober-Hofmeisterin at the Imperial Court of Russia. A favorite and confidant of Charlotte Christine, she was accused of isolating her from Russia, prevented her from adjusting to her new life and creating distance between her and her spouse, the Russian heir to the throne. After the death of Charlotte Christine, she returned to her father's court.

== Marriage ==
On 17 February 1721, Juliana Luise married Joachim Frederick, Duke of Schleswig-Holstein-Sonderburg-Plön. She miscarried their only child, a daughter, on 28 May 1722, four months after Joachim Frederick's death.
