= Marie Charlotte of East Frisia =

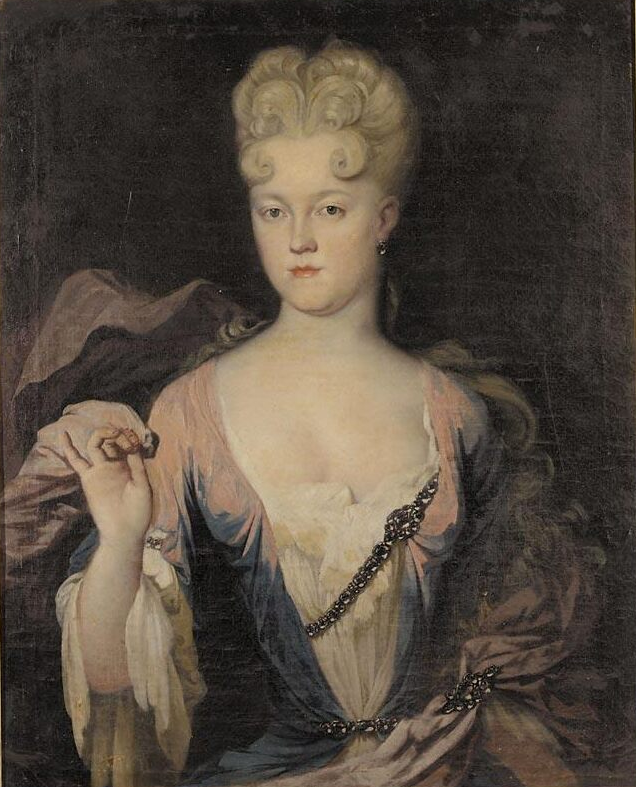
- Marie Charlotte of East Frisia
- Born: 10 April 1689
- Died: 9 December 1761 (aged 72)
- Spouse: Frederick Ulrich of East Frisia
- Father: Christian Everhard, Prince of East Frisia
- Mother: Eberhardine Sophie of Oettingen-Oettingen

Marie Charlotte of East Frisia (April 10, 1689 in Berum – December 9, 1761) was a daughter of Prince Christian Everhard of East Frisia and the wife of Frederick Ulrich of East Frisia. As his wife, she was Countess of Kriechingen, as well as Lady of Püttlingen.

== Biography ==
Marie Charlotte was the third eldest child of the Prince of East Frisia, Christian Eberhard Cirksena of East Frisia, and Eberhardine Sophie of Oettingen-Oettingen. She had nine siblings. From 1707, her father's cousin, Frederick Ulrich, Count of East Frisia, heir of Kriechingen and the lordships of Saarwellingen, Crieching, Puttlingen and Rollingen, courted her. The wedding took place on April 10, 1709. The only child of the marriage was a daughter, Christine Louise (* February 1, 1710; † May 12, 1732), who married Count Johann Ludwig of Wied-Runkel (* May 30, 1705; † May 18, 1762) in 1726. Christine Louise had four children by her husband. The count died shortly after the birth of his daughter on March 13, 1710. After the death of her husband, Marie Charlotte managed the inheritance of her underage daughter until 1726. Marie Charlotte later named a farm built in 1719 and the associated village of Luisenthal after her daughter. After the House of Cirksena died out in the male line in 1744, Marie Charlotte and her sister Friederike Wilhelmine (1695–1750), tried in vain to take over the county. Instead, Frederick II of Prussia prevailed and incorporated East Frisia into his domain.
