= George Albert, Prince of East Frisia =

Georg Albrecht
- Prince of East Frisia; Lord of Esens, Stedesdorf and Wittmund
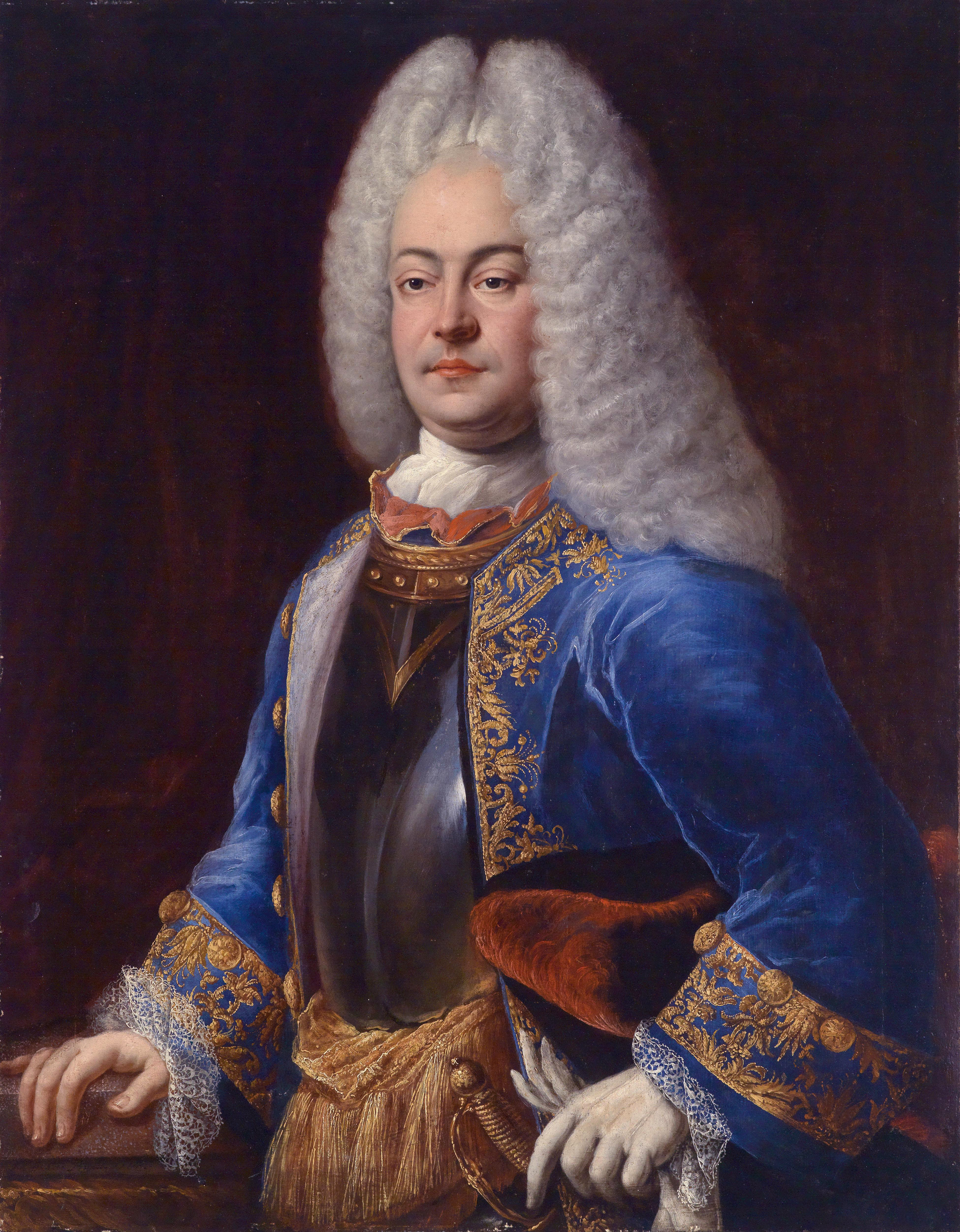
- George Albert, Prince of East Frisia (Johann Conrad Eichler, 1718)

Prince of East Frisia; Lord of Esens, Stedesdorf and Wittmund
- Reign: 30 June 1708 - 11 June 1734
- Predecessor: Christian Everhard
- Successor: Charles Edzard
- Born: 13 June 1690
- Died: 11 June 1734 (aged 43)
- Spouse: Countess Christine Louise of Nassau-Idstein; Sophie Caroline of Brandenburg-Kulmbach
- House: Cirksena
- Father: Christian Everhard, Prince of East Frisia
- Mother: Eberhadine Sophie of Oettingen-Oettingen
- Religion: Lutheranism

George Albert (13 June 1690 – 11 June 1734) was a member of the family of the Cirksena and was the fourth Prince of East Frisia. He ruled from 1708 to 1734.

== Life ==
He was the second son of Prince Christian Eberhard. On 24 September 1709, he married in Idstein his first wife, Princess Christine Louise of Nassau-Idstein (31 March 1691 – 13 April 1723), daughter of George August, Prince of Nassau-Idstein. They had five children:

- George Christian (13 October 1710 – 28 April 1711).
- Henriette Charlotte (23 October 1711 – 29 October 1711).
- Charles Christian (4 January 1715 – 14 Jan 1715).
- Charles Edzard (18 June 1716 – 25 May 1744).
- Henriette Auguste Wilhelmine (22 April 1718 – 21 April 1719).

During his reign, East Frisia was hit hard by the Christmas flood of 1717: 2,752 people drowned and large tracts of land were devastated.

His first wife, Christine Louise, died on 13 April 1723. On 8 December of that year, in Berum, George Albert married his second wife, Sophie Caroline, daughter of Christian Henry, Margrave of Brandenburg-Kulmbach. She received from George Albert the manor Fürstinnen-Grashaus in the polder Carolinengroden as a present. She drew revenues from it until her death in 1764.

During George Albert's rule the old conflict between the Prince and a part of the Estates escalated into the so-called Appeal War of 1726–1727. The Estates were in divided into an obedient and a renitent faction; the former sided with the Prince; the latter raised troops to fight him. George Albert emerged victorious from this conflict. Even the city of Emden, which had led the renitent faction, submitted to him. However, due to the poor negotiating skills of George Albert's Chancellor Enno Rudolph Brenneysen, no peace could be agreed between the warring factions. The Chancellor and the Prince demanded that the rebels be punished harshly, but in 1732, they were pardoned by the Emperor.

When Prince George Albert died on 11 June 1734, his son Charles Edzard, took office at the age of 18. Charles Edzard was the George Albert's last surviving descendant. He could not resolve the conflicts with the Estates, either.

== Legacy ==
In 1715, George Albert issued the world's first Stallion Inspection Regulation.

In 1729-1730 Prince George Albert built a port at Carolinensiel, now a museum harbor. The port was named after his second wife, Sophie Caroline.

In an attempt to keep alcoholism under control, George Albert forbade ball shooting matches on 9 February 1731. He sharply condemned the "disorders, excessive drinking, eating, solding, swearing, cursing and severe beatings" that often occurred at ball shooting matches. This, too, stressed the relationship between the prince and his subjects.

== Ancestors ==
Ancestors of George Albert, Prince of East Frisia

16. Enno III, Count of East Frisia
8. Ulrich II, Count of East Frisia
17. Anna of Holstein-Gottorp
4. George Christian, Prince of East Frisia
18. Louis V, Landgrave of Hesse-Darmstadt
9. Juliana of Hesse-Darmstadt
19. Magdalene of Brandenburg
2. Christian Everhard, Prince of East Frisia
20. John Frederick, Duke of Württemberg (= 28)
10. Eberhard III, Duke of Württemberg (= 14)
21. Barbara Sophie of Brandenburg (= 29)
5. Christine Charlotte of Württemberg
22. John Casimir, Wild- and Rhinegrave of Salm-Kyrburg (=30)
11. Anna Catherine, Wild- and Rhinegravine of Salm-Kyrburg (= 15)
23. Dorothea of Solms-Laubach (= 31)
1. George Albert, Prince of East Frisia
24. Louis Eberhard, Count of Oettingen-Oettingen
12. Joachim Ernest of Oettingen-Oettingen
25. Margaret of Erbach
6. Albert Ernest I of Oettingen-Oettingen
26. Kraft of Hohenlohe-Neuenstein
13. Anna Dorothea of Hohenlohe-Neuenstein-Gleichen
27. Sophie of Birkenfeld
3. Eberhardine Sophie of Oettingen-Oettingen
28. John Frederick, Duke of Württemberg (= 20)
14. Eberhard III, Duke of Württemberg (= 10)
29. Barbara Sophie of Brandenburg (= 21)
7. Christine Friederike of Württemberg
30. John Casimir, Wild- and Rhinegrave of Salm-Kyrburg (= 22)
15. Anna Catherine, Wild- and Rhinegravine of Salm-Kyrburg (= 11)
31. Dorothea of Solms-Laubach (= 23)

== References and sources ==
- Martin Jhering: Hofleben in Ostfriesland. Die Fürstenresidenz Aurich im Jahre 1728, Hannover, 2005

George Albert, Prince of East Frisia Cirksena Born: 13 June 1690 Died: 12 June 1734
Preceded by Christian Everhard	Prince of East Frisia; 1708–1734	Succeeded by Charles Edzard
