= Christian Everhard, Prince of East Frisia =

Christian Everhard
- Prince of East Frisia; Lord of Esens, Stedesdorf and Wittmund
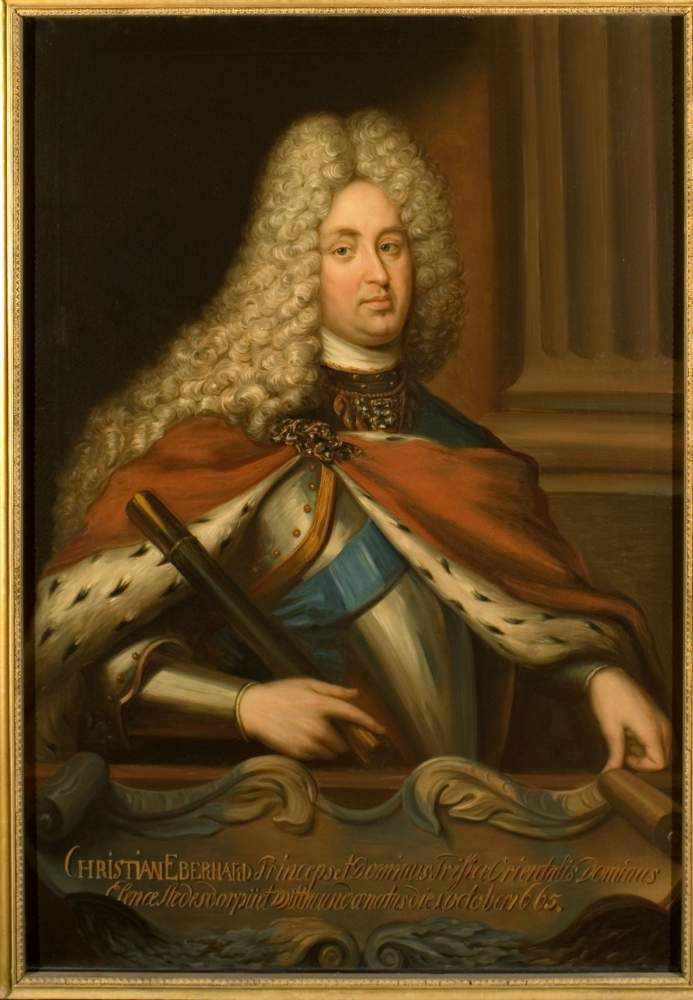
- Christian Everhard, Prince of East Frisia

Prince of East Frisia; Lord of Esens, Stedesdorf and Wittmund
- Reign: 14 March 1690 - 30 June 1708
- Predecessor: Christine Charlotte of Württemberg (as regent)
- Successor: George Albert
- Born: 1 October 1665; Esens
- Died: 30 June 1708 (aged 42); Aurich
- Spouse: Eberhadine Sophie of Oettingen-Oettingen
- House: Cirksena
- Father: George Christian, Prince of East Frisia
- Mother: Christine Charlotte of Württemberg
- Religion: Lutheranism

Prince Christian Everhard of East Frisia (1 October 1665, Esens – 30 June 1708, Aurich) was a Prince of East Frisia from the House of Cirksena from the day he was born in 1665, but remained under guardianship until 1690.

== Early life ==
Born into the ruling family of East Frisia, Christian Everhard was born as the third child and only son of George Christian, Prince of East Frisia and his wife, Duchess Christine Charlotte of Württemberg.

== Biography ==
Before taking office, Everhard spent much time abroad. Unlike some other members of the House of Cirksena, he had few disputes with the Estates of East Frisia. He took over the government in 1690 from his mother, who administered the country until then as his guardian and regent. He quickly settled some disputes with the Estates, consolidating the peace, and bringing him the nickname "the peaceable".

Everhard was considered prudent, tolerant and pious. Like his mother, he allowed the presence of the Reformed Church although he himself was Lutheran. He approved an inheritance treaty with the Guelph elector Ernest Augustus of Brunswick-Lüneburg. The treaty was subsequently rejected by the emperor, who instead accepted a claim by Brandenburg and ruled that if the House of Cirksena were to die out, Brandenburg would inherit East Frisia. Based on this ruling, Prussia occupied East Frisia when the Cirksena died out in 1744.

Everhard was sickly since childhood, and was accompanied on his travels by his personal physician, Eberhard Bacmeister. Everhard died in 1708, at a young age, like many Cirksena. He was succeeded by his second son George Albert.

== Marriage and issue ==
Prince Christian Everhard was married to Princess Eberhardine Sophie of Oettingen-Oettingen (born: 16 August 1666; died 30 October 1700), a daughter of Albert Ernest I, Prince of Öttingen-Öttingen (1642-1683) and his first wife, Duchess Christine Friederike of Württemberg (1644-1674). The couple had the following children:

- Leopold Ignaz (born: 10 or 20 February 1687; died: 11 or 21 June 1687)
- Christina Sophia (born: 16 March 1688 in Bayreuth; died: 31 March 1750 in Rudolstadt)

married on 31 December 1728 in Rudolstadt with Prince Frederick Anton of Schwarzburg-Rudolstadt (born: 14 August 1692; died: 1 September 1744). The marriage remained childless

- Marie Charlotte (born: 10 April 1689; died: 9 December 1761)

married on 10 April 1709 Frederick Ulrich of East Frisia (born: 31 December 1667; died: 13 March 1710), son of Count Ferdinand Edzard of East Frisia. They had one daughter :
- Christine Louise of East Frisia, Heiress of Criechingen, Püttingen and Rollingen (born: 1 February 1710; died: 12 May 1732)

married on 14 August 1726 Johann Ludwig Adolph of Wied-Runkel (born: 30 May 1705; died: 18 May 1762)

- George Albert, Prince of East Frisia (1690-1734), since 1722 Knight of the Order of the Elephant

married firstly, on 24 September 1709 in Idstein with Countess Christiane Louise of Nassau-Idstein (born: 31 March 1691; died: 13 April 1723), daughter of Count George August of Nassau-Idstein
married secondly, on 8 December 1723 in Berum with Sophie Caroline of Brandenburg-Kulmbach (born: 1705; died: 7 June 1764), daughter of Christian Henry of Brandenburg-Kulmbach

- Frederick Ulrich (born: 18 July 1691; died 21 September 1691)
- Charles Enno (born: 25 December 1692; died: 3 August 3, 1709)
- Friederike Wilhelmine (born: 4 October 1695; died: 29 July 1750 in Aurich), canonist in Herford
- Enno August (born: 13 February 1697; died: 3 August 1725)
- Juliana Luise (born:13 June 1698 in Aurich, died: 6 Feb 1740 in Harzgerode)

married on 17 February 1721 in Brunswick with Duke Joachim Frederick of Schleswig-Holstein-Sonderburg-Plön (born: 9 May 1668, died: 25 January 1722)

- Christine Charlotte (born: 17 September 1699; died: 23 August 23, 1733)

After the death of his first wife in 1701, he married Anna Juliana of Kleinau, Lady of Sandhorst (1674–1727). They had three children:

- Stillborn son (25 December 1702)
- Stillborn daughter (27 December 1704)
- Antoinette Sophie Juliane of Sandhorst (born: 4 January 1707; died: 14 January 1725), (died at the smallpox, buried in the Cirksena family mausoleum in Aurich)

== References and sources ==
- Martin Tielke (ed.): Biographisches Lexikon für Ostfriesland
- Ernst Esselborn: Das Geschlecht Cirksena. Die Häuptlinge, Grafen und Fürsten von Ostfriesland, Berlin-Pankow, 1945

Christian Everhard, Prince of East Frisia Cirksena Born: 1 October 1665 Died: 30 June 1708
Preceded by Christine Charlotte as Regent	Prince of East Frisia; 1690–1708	Succeeded by George Albert
