= Enno Rudolph Brenneysen =

Chancellor of East Frisia
- In office 1720–1734
- Monarch: George Albert, Prince of East Frisia

vice chancellor
- In office 1708–1702

councillor
- In office 1697–1702

Personal details
- Born: 26 October 1669 Esens
- Died: 22 September 1734 (aged 64) Aurich

Enno Rudolph Brenneysen (26 October 1669 in Esens – 22 September 1734 in Aurich) was Chancellor of East Friesland under Prince George Albert.

== Life ==
Brenneysen attended the Ulrich High School in Norden. After studying law in Halle, Brenneysen joined the government of the principality as a councilor in 1697. In 1708 he became vice chancellor and finally in 1720 chancellor and director of the Privy Council. During the reign of George Albert, he led a relatively unrestricted government and tried to establish in East Frisia a system of religiously inspired absolutism. This, however, was bound to deepen the existing tensions between the prince and the East Frisian Estates. In 1726 and 1727, the conflict escalated to the Appeal War. The Prince won this conflict and even the unruly city of Emden had to surrender to him. Ironically, Brenneysen then became the Count's chief negotiator. His poor negotiation skills thwarted a peaceful settlement. Although Chancellor and Prince called for strict punishment of the unruly Estates, they were pardoned in 1732 by the Emperor.

Among Brenneysen's merits are his book on the Frisian history and a constitution, written in the early 18th century.

== Legacy ==
When Prince George Albert died on 11 June 1734, Charles Edzard, the only surviving descendant of George Albert, took office at the age of 18, took office as. However, he, too, could not resolve the conflicts with the estates. Around this time a smooth transition to Prussian control was being prepared. An important factor was the position of the city of Emden, which had been politically isolated by the Appeal War. Emden was trying to regain its position as the economic capital and in 1740 requested Prussian help. Emden proposed a treaty in which the city's privileges and economic position were guaranteed and in return the Estates would recognize Prussia's claim on East Frisia. On 14 March 1744, the agreement was finalized in the form of two treaties. The Prussian claim was additionally based on a decision made by Emperor Leopold I in 1694, acknowledging Prussias right to inherit East Frisia in the event of a lack of a male heir. Despite the opposition of the Kingdom of Hanover, Prussia would prevail. After the death of the last ruler of the House of Cirksena in 1744, Frederick the Great took over East Frisia.

== References and sources ==
- J. S. Ersch and J. G. Gruber (eds.): Allgemeine Encyclopädie der Wissenschaften und Künste in alphabetischer Folge von genannten Schriftstellern bearbeitet, vol. 12, Leipzig, 1824, p. 360 col. 2, google books; retrieved 13 April 2010
- Ernst Friedlaender (1876). "Brenneysen, Enno Rudolf" . Allgemeine Deutsche Biographie (in German). Vol. 3. Leipzig: Duncker & Humblot. pp. 308–309.
- Joseph König (1955). "Brenneysen, Enno Rudolf". Neue Deutsche Biographie (in German). Vol. 2. Berlin: Duncker & Humblot. pp. 588–588.
