= Groß Midlum =

- Village of Hinte
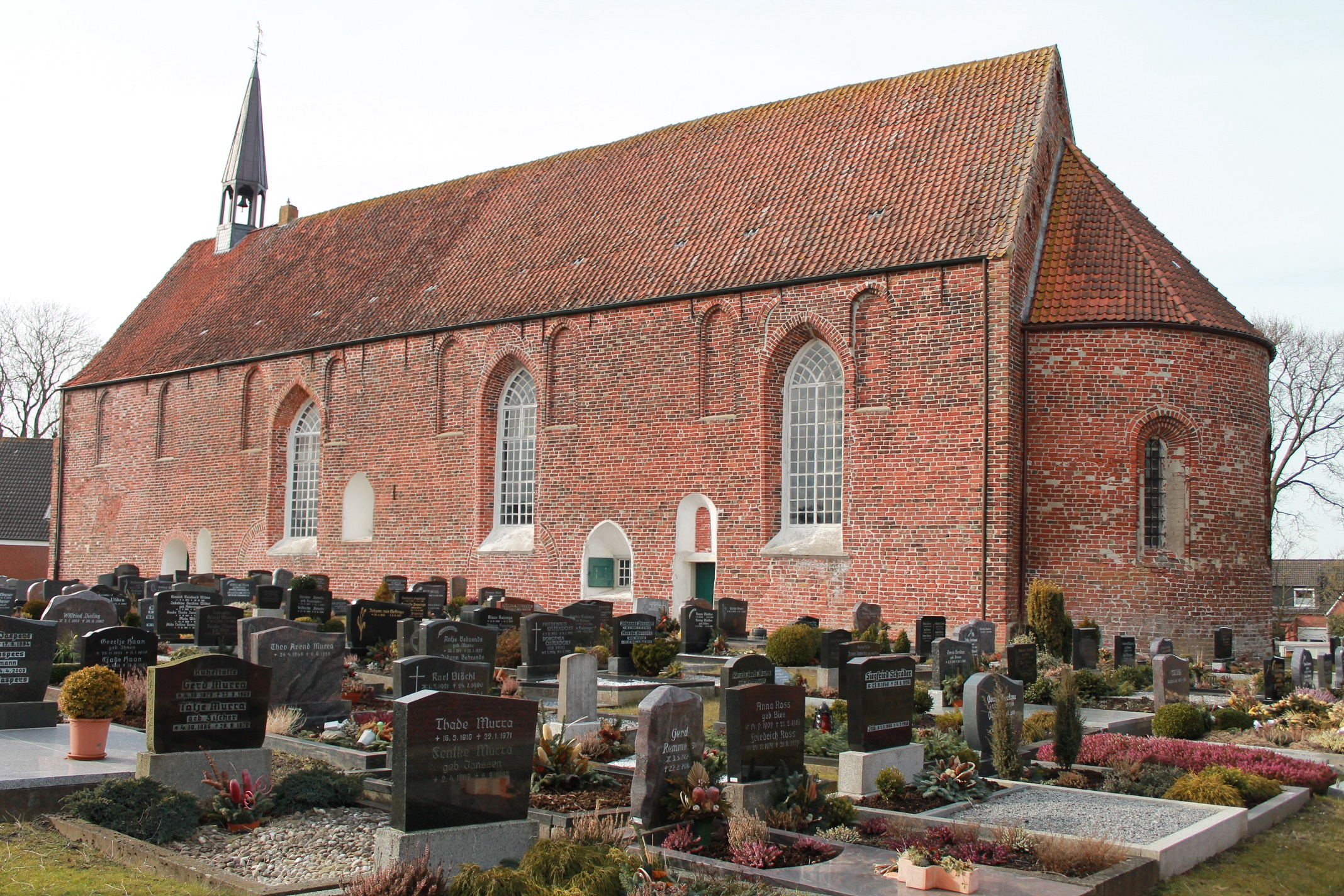
- Church of Groß Midlum

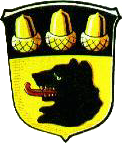
- Coat of arms
- Interactive map of Groß Midlum
- Location within Germany Location within Lower Saxony
- Country: Germany
- State: Lower Saxony
- District: Aurich
- Municipality: Hinte
- Elevation: 0 m (0 ft)

Population
  - Metro: 760
- Time zone: UTC+01:00 (CET)
  - Summer (DST): UTC+02:00 (CEST)
- Postal codes: 26759
- Dialling codes: 04925

Groß Midlum is a village in the region of East Frisia, in Lower Saxony, Germany. Administratively, it is an Ortsteil of the municipality of Hinte, of which it is located to the west. Groß Midlum is about 5 kilometers to the north of Emden.

The addition Groß ("large") distinguishes the village from the smaller Midlum in nearby Rheiderland. The village, built on a warft, was first mentioned in the 10th century. It has a medieval church from the 13th century.

== Gallery ==
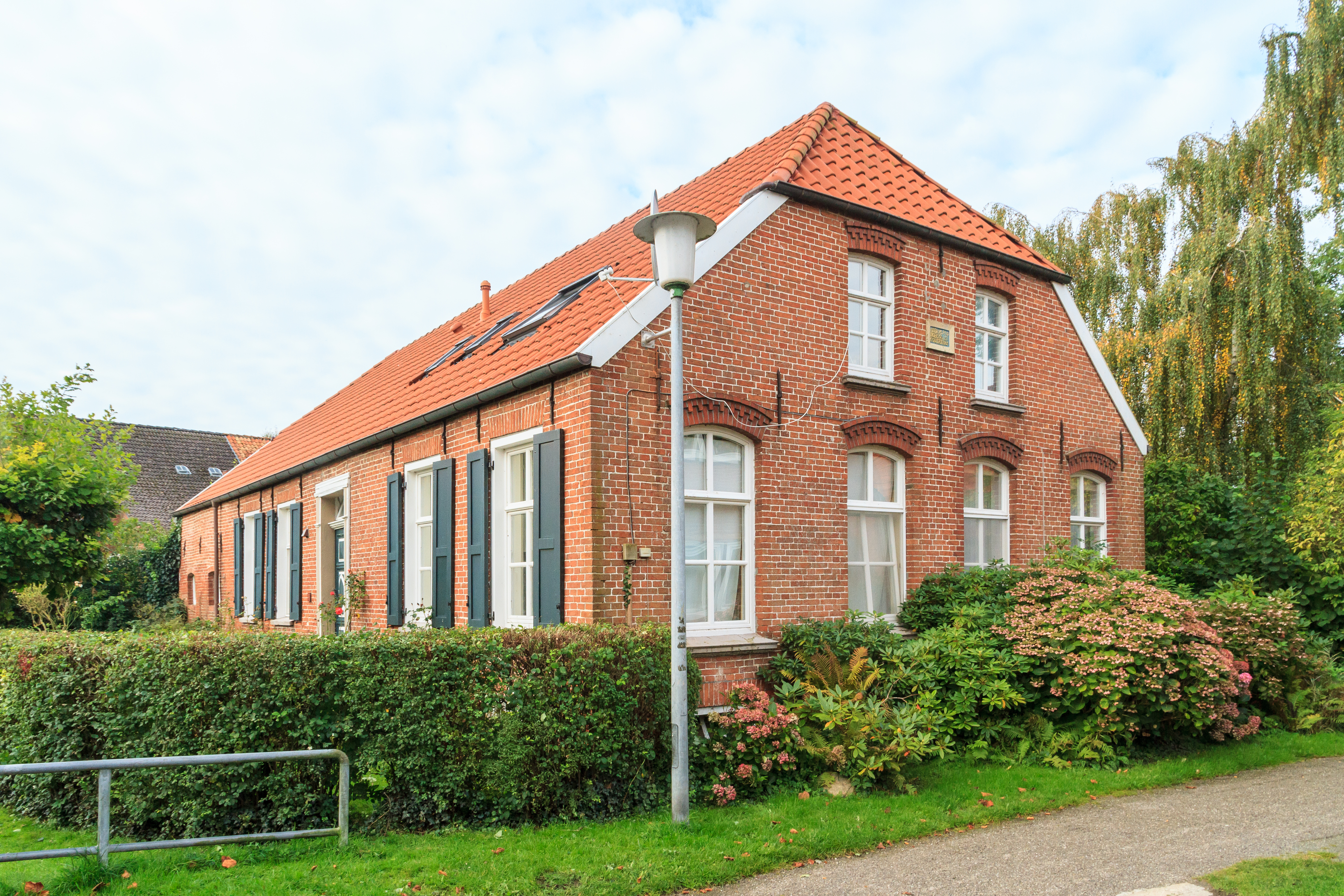
Manningaburg

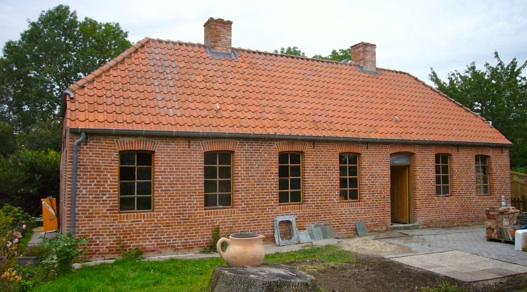
Poorhouse

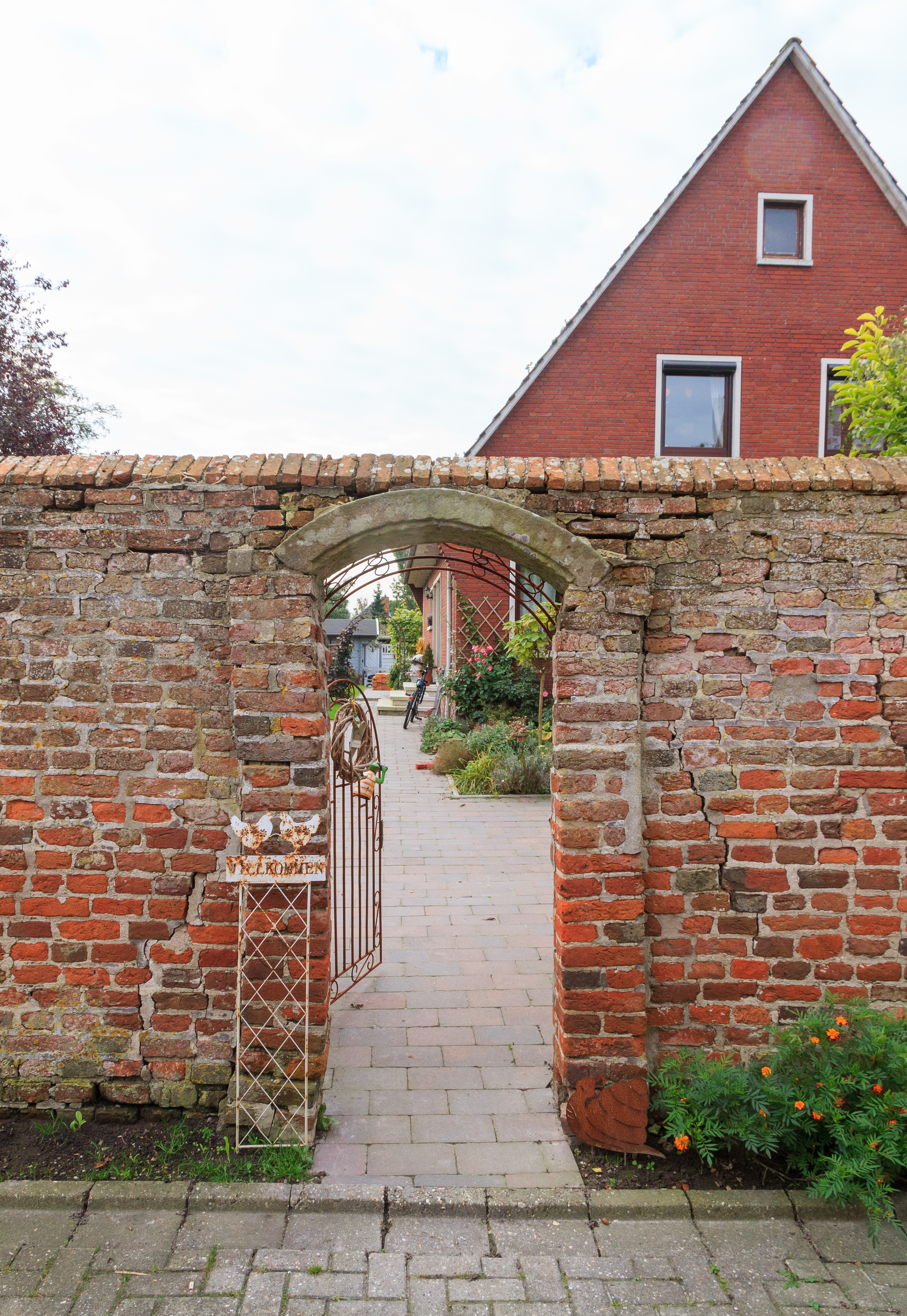
Remains of the castle wall of Groß Midlum Castle
