= Accord of Osterhusen =

Agreement signed by Enno III of East Frisia

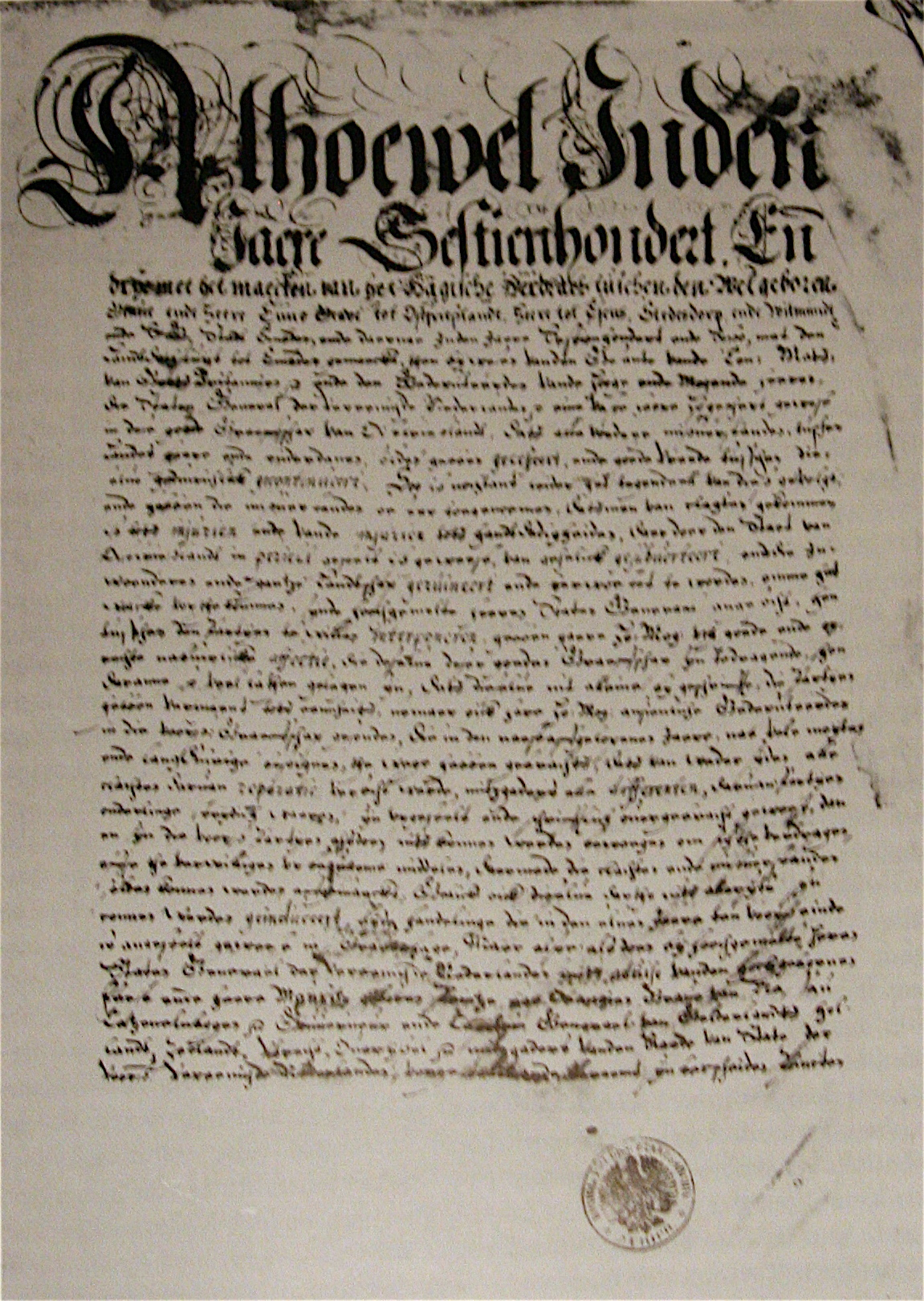
Title page of the Accord of Osterhusen

The Accord of Osterhusen was an agreement signed by Enno III of East Frisia on 21 May 1611 in Osterhusen with the mediation of the Dutch States General with the revolting East Frisian estates of the County of East Frisia. The Accord of Osterhusen once again confirmed previous state treaties and established the sovereignty of the East Frisian estates in legislation, tax collection and jurisdiction. Its provisions regulated the relationship between the count and the estates (and in particular the city of Emden).

== Background information ==
Despite repeated attempts at reconciliation such as the Delfzijl Agreement of 1595 and the Agreement of The Hague of 1603, domestic political differences between Count Enno III and the city of Emden erupt in 1609 in military actions by the Emden Estates garrison against the count. This led, among other things, to the occupation of Aurich and Greetsiel by troops of the East Frisian estates.

== The Accord ==
Under pressure and mediation from the Dutch States General (as a guarantor power), a treaty was concluded between the count and the East Frisian estates at a general state assembly in Osterhusen on May 21, 1611, which regulated the relationship between the two sides. A far-reaching restriction of the count's powers was recorded in 91 articles in Dutch on 34 parchment sheets. Among other things, the estates' tax sovereignty was confirmed and Emden's extensive independence within the county was agreed. In addition, the count's court was placed under the supervision of the estates, the farmers' taxes to the count were limited, and the right of the regional communities to freely elect their dike and sluice judges was included in the treaty.

== Consequences of the accord ==
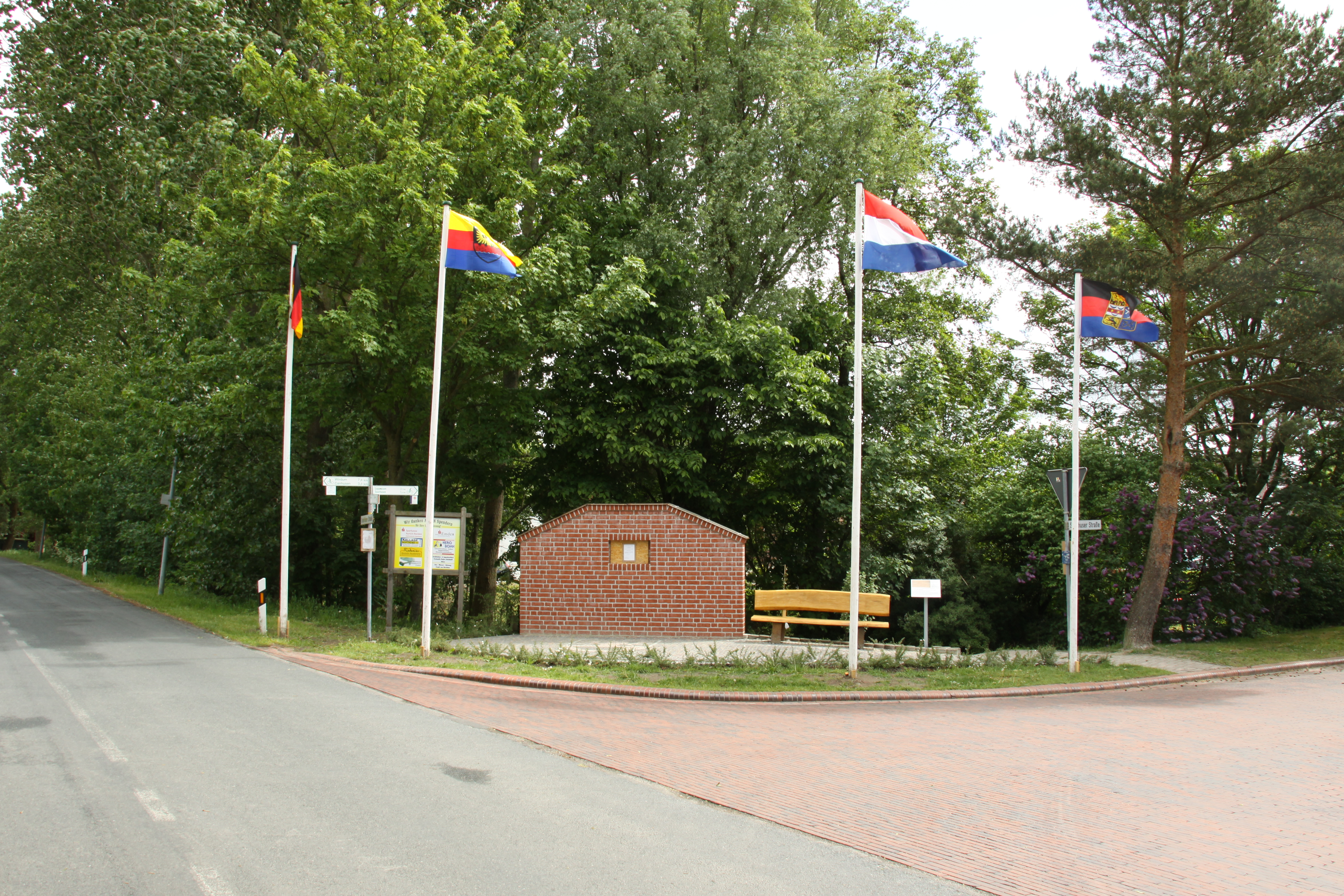
Monument dedicated to the Accord of Osterhusen

The "Accord of Osterhusen" essentially turned the county of East Frisia into a representative democracy. The counts and princes of East Frisia were subsequently completely dependent on the estates for financial support. Because of this importance, it is often referred to as the "Magna Carta" of the East Frisian estates. Five originals of the Osterhusian Accord have survived to this day. Four are in the State Archives of Lower Saxony and another is in the Emden City Archives.

== See also ==
- East Frisia
- County of East Frisia
- History of East Frisia
- Enno III of East Frisia
