= History of East Frisia =

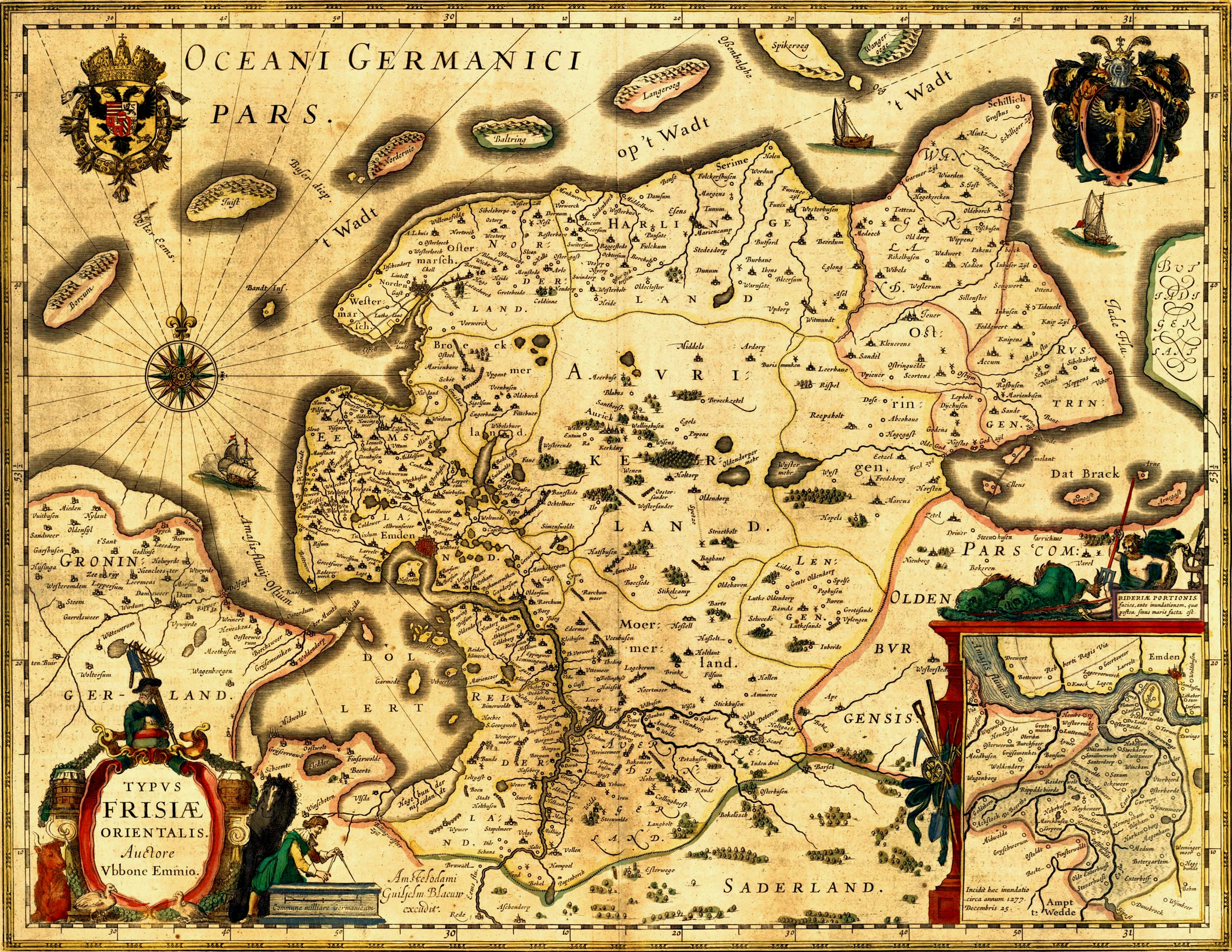
East Frisia c. 1600, drawn by Ubbo Emmius

The history of East Frisia developed rather independently from the rest of Germany because the region was relatively isolated for centuries by large stretches of bog to the south, while at the same time its people were oriented towards the sea. Thus in East Frisia in the Middle Ages there was little feudalism, instead a system of fellowship under the so-called Friesian Freedom emerged. It was not until 1464, that the House of Cirksena was enfeoffed with the Imperial County of East Frisia. Nevertheless absolutism had been, and continued to be, unknown in East Frisia. In the two centuries after about 1500, the influence of the Netherlands is discernable - politically, economically and culturally. In 1744, the county lost its independence within the Holy Roman Empire and became part of Prussia. Following the Vienna Congress of 1815, it was transferred to the Kingdom of Hanover, in 1866 it went back to Prussia and, from 1946, it has been part of the German state of Lower Saxony.

Also prominent in East Frisia's history is its centuries old struggle against flooding by the North Sea. Man began to settle in the lowlands on the coast around the year 1000 A.D., laying out warfts and dykes as protection against flooding. However, the land was repeatedly devastated by storm surges that led to the dykes being breached, widespread flooding and loss of land.

Advances in agriculture may be seen in the improved melioration of marshland and the systematic reclamation of the bogs (from 1633). Trade, especially maritime trade, has played an important role at almost all periods of history. Thus the town of Emden was one of the leading ports in Europe by around 1600, and at the same time developed into a stronghold of Calvinism. Agriculture and fishing have been the most important sectors of industry for centuries and industrialization took place relatively late.

== Literature ==
- Jan Wybren Buma (ed.): Die Brokmer Rechtshandschriften. Nijhoff, The Hague, 1949 (Oudfriese Taal- en Rechtsbronnen 5).
- Karl Cramer, Die Geschichte Ostfrieslands – Ein Überblick. Isensee Verlag, Oldenburg, 2003, ISBN 3-89598-982-7.
- Walter Deeters: Kleine Geschichte Ostfrieslands. Verlag Schuster, Leer, 1992, ISBN 3-7963-0229-7.
- Geschichte des Rheiderlandes. Risius, Weener, 2006ff.
- Heiko Heikes, Die Ukena. In: Jahrbuch der Gesellschaft für bildende Kunst und vaterländische Altertümer zu Emden. Vol. 34, 1954, ISSN 0341-969X, pp. 15–52.
- Onno Klopp: Geschichte Ostfrieslands. 3 vols. Rümpler, Hanover, 1854–1858.
- Hajo van Lengen: Bauernfreiheit und Häuptlingsherrschaft. In: Karl-Ernst Behre / Hajo van Lengen: Ostfriesland. Geschichte und Gestalt einer Kulturlandschaft. Ostfriesische Landschaft, Aurich, 1995, ISBN 3-925365-85-0, pp. 113–134.
- Hajo van Lengen (ed.): Die Friesische Freiheit des Mittelalters – Leben und Legende. Verlag Ostfriesische Landschaft, Aurich, 2003, ISBN 3-932206-30-4.
- Almuth Salomon: Friesische Geschichtsbilder, Historisches Ereignis und kollektives Gedächtnis im mittelalterlichen Friesland. Ostfriesische Landschaftliche Verlags- und Vertriebsgesellschaft, Aurich, 2000, ISBN 3-932206-19-3 (Abhandlungen und Vorträge zur Geschichte Ostfrieslands, Vol. 78).
- Heinrich Tjaden: Illustrierte Ostfriesische Geschichte. Verlag Schwalbe, Emden, 1913 (with a map of the Rheiderland before it was flooded).
