= Christine Charlotte of Württemberg =

Princess consort of East Frisia

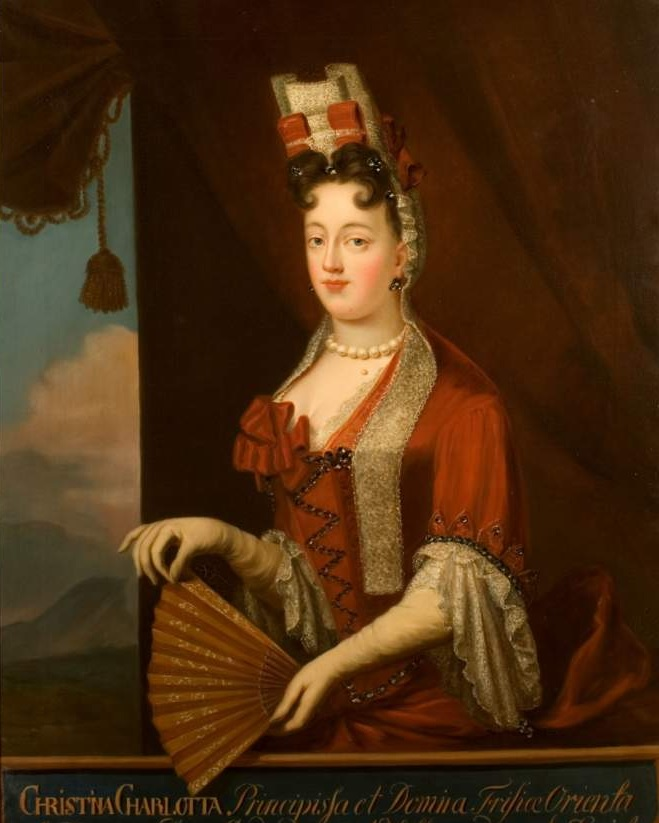

Princess consort of East Frisia
- Reign: 14 May 1662 – 6 June 1665
- Predecessor: Juliana Sophia of Barby-Mühlingen
- Successor: Eberhardine Sophie of Oettingen-Oettingen

Princess of East Frisia (as regent); Lady of Esens, Stedesdorf and Wittmund (as regent)
- Reign: 6 June 1665 - 14 March 1690
- Predecessor: George Christian
- Successor: Christian Everhard
- Born: 21 October 1645; Stuttgart
- Died: 16 May 1699 (aged 53); Bruchhausen
- Spouse: George Christian, Prince of East Frisia
- Issue: Christian Everhard, Prince of East Frisia
- House: House of Württemberg
- Father: Eberhard III, Duke of Württemberg
- Mother: Anna Catharina of Salm-Kyrburg

Christine Charlotte of Württemberg (21 October 1645, Stuttgart – 16 May 1699, Bruchhausen) was a princess consort of East Frisia by her marriage to George Christian, Prince of East Frisia. She served as the regent of East Frisia during the minority of her son from 1665 until 1690.

== Early life ==
Born into the ancient House of Württemberg, Christine Charlotte was born as the fourth daughter and eight child of Duke Eberhard III, Duke of Württemberg and Anna Catharina of Salm-Kyrburg (1614-1655).

== Marriage ==
At the age of 16, she married on 14 May 1662 Count George Christian of East Frisia, who was raised in the same year to the rank of Imperial Prince.

=== Regency ===
George Christian died on 6 June 1665, leaving his wife pregnant with their third child; their first child had already died the previous July. Four months later (1 October 1665), Christine Charlotte gave birth to her only son, Christian Everhard. Her second child went on to die the following June.

As the mother of the newborn Christian Everhard, she became his guardian and regent of East Frisia. She tried to rule as an absolutist princess, which led to a series of conflict with the equally self-conscious estates of East Frisia and brought the country to the brink of civil war several times.

She was considered extraordinarily beautiful, intelligent and eloquent, but also domineering, unforgiving, unrepentant and wasteful. Her reign was marked by disputes within East Frisia. Historians have a negative view of her overall performance, which may be due to her conflicts with the estates of the realm.

Her major foreign policy success was a border treaty with Oldenburg on 22 December 1666. This treaty created the so-called Golden line, which separates East Frisia from Oldenburg Friesland to this day.

In 1690, the Emperor confirmed the estates and declared her son of age.

Christine Charlotte always had delicate lungs, frequently suffering from constant coughing, fainting, and fevers. She finally died on 16 May 1699 at the age of 53.

== Issue ==
Only one of the couple's three children lived to adulthood:

- Eberhardine Katharina (25 May 1663 – 10 July 1664), died in early childhood.
- Juliane Charlotte (3 January 1664 – 3 June 1666), died in early childhood.
- Christian Everhard (1 October 1665 – 30 June 1708), the successor of his father.

== Ancestors ==
Ancestors of Christine Charlotte of Württemberg

8. Frederick I, Duke of Württemberg
4. John Frederick, Duke of Württemberg
9. Sibylla of Anhalt-Zerbst
2. Eberhard III, Duke of Württemberg
10. Joachim Frederick, Elector of Brandenburg
5. Barbara Sophie of Brandenburg
11. Catherine of Brandenburg-Küstrin
1. Christine Charlotte of Württemberg
12. Otto I, Wild- and Rhinegrave of Kyrburg-Mörchingen
6. John Casimir, Wild- and Rhinegrave of Kyrburg
13. Otillie of Nassau-Weilburg
3. Anna Katharina of Salm-Kyrburg
14. John George I, Count of Solms-Laubach
7. Dorothea of Solms-Laubach
15. Margarete of Schönburg-Glauchau

== Literature ==
- Raff, Gerhard (2002). Hie gut Wirtemberg allewege (in German). Vol. III. Stuttgart/Leipzig: Hohenheim. pp. 70–133. ISBN 3-89850-084-5.

Christine Charlotte of Württemberg Cirksena Born: 21 October 1645 Died: 16 May 1699
Preceded by Georg Christian	Regent of East Frisia; 1665–1690	Succeeded by Christian Everhard
Vacant Title last held by Juliana Sophia of Barby-Mühlingen	Princess of East Frisia; 1662–1665	Vacant Title next held by Eberhardine Sophie of Oettingen-Oettingen
