= Onno Klopp =

German historian (1822–1903)

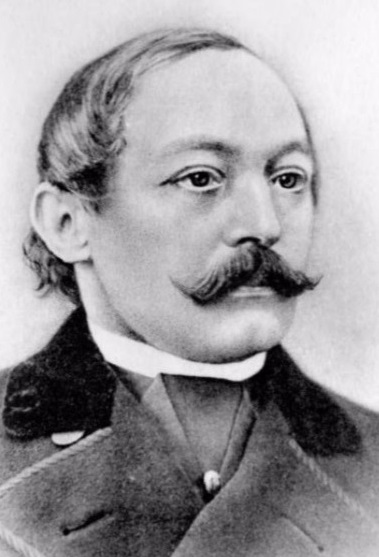
Onno Klopp (about 1860)

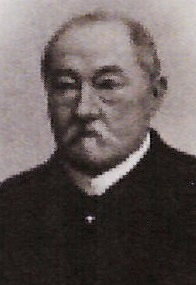
Onno Klopp (about 1900)

Onno Klopp (9 October 1822 in Leer, Kingdom of Hanover – 9 August 1903 in Penzing, Austria) was a German historian, best known as the author of Der Fall des Hauses Stuart (The Fall of the House of Stuart), the fullest existing account of the later Stuarts. He is also known as one of the few German historians who denigrated Frederick the Great.

== Life ==
Klopp was educated at the universities of Bonn, Berlin and Göttingen (1841–1845). For a few years, he was a teacher at Leer and at Osnabrück. In 1858, he settled at Hanover, where he became intimate with King George V, who made him his Archivrat. Thoroughly disliking Prussia, he was in hearty accord with George in resisting the empire's aggressive policy. After the annexation of Hanover in 1866 he accompanied the exiled king to Hietzing. He became a Roman Catholic in 1874. He died at Penzing, near Vienna, in 1903. Klopp is best known as the author of Der Fall des Hauses Stuart (Vienna, 1875–1888), the fullest existing account of the later Stuarts.

== Works ==
His Der König Friedrich II. und seine Politik (Schaffhausen 1867) and Geschichte Ostfrieslands (Hanover, 1854–1858) show his dislike of Prussia. His other works include Der dreissigjährige Krieg bis zum Tode Gustav Adolfs (Paderborn, 1891–1896); a revised edition of his Tilly im Dreißigjährigen Krieg (Stuttgart, 1861); a life of George V, König Georg V. (Hanover, 1878); Das Jahr 1683 (1882); and Phillipp Melanchthon (Berlin, 1897). He edited Corrispondenza epistolare tra Leopoldo I. imperatore ed il P. Marco d'Aviano cappuccino (Gratz, 1888). Klopp also wrote much in defence of George V and his claim to Hanover, including the Offizieller Bericht über die Kriegsereignisse zwischen Hanover und Preussen im Juni 1866 (Vienna, 1867), and he edited the works of Leibniz in eleven volumes.
