= Theda of East Frisia =

East Frisian noblewoman (1502–1563)

- Born: 1502
- Died: 29 November 1563 (aged 60–61); Norden
- Buried: Great Church of Emden
- Noble family: Cirksena
- Father: Edzard I
- Mother: Elisabeth of Rietberg

Theda of East Frisia (1502 – 29 November 1563 in Norden) was a member of the House of Cirksena and the second daughter of Count Edzard I of East Frisia and Elisabeth of Rietberg. Raised at the convent of Marienthal in Norden, she entered religious life as a child and remained a nun for the rest of her life. Although she played no political role, she is chiefly known from a personal letter to her father, preserved by Tileman Dothias Wiarda, which offers a rare glimpse into the private life of a sixteenth-century East Frisian comital daughter.

== Early life ==
Theda of East Frisia was born in 1502 as the second daughter of Count Edzard I of East Frisia and Elisabeth of Rietberg. She was one of seven children, consisting of four daughters, Margaretha, Theda, Armgard and Anna, and three sons, Ulrich, Enno and Johann. She was educated at the convent of Marienthal in Norden. At approximately nine or ten years of age she entered the religious life and was received as a nun in the convent. Following her profession, Theda informed her father of her decision in a personal letter and sent him the hair that had been cut during the ceremony. Wiarda records that both the original letter and the lock of her golden-blonde hair were still preserved in the government archives at Aurich in his own time. He further notes that she greatly appreciated a gift of four ells of black cloth brought to her by Abbot Gerhard von Schulenburg of Emden and regarded the modest celebration of her profession, at which Norder beer was served, as a festive occasion. Wiarda reproduced her entire letter because, in his opinion, it reflected both the sincerity of the young countess and the customs of the age.

== Later life ==
Theda remained at the convent of Marienthal in Norden throughout the first half of the sixteenth century. Following the introduction of the Reformation in East Frisia and the dissolution of the convent in 1557, she left Marienthal and settled in Aurich, where she continued to live a secluded life. She remained in Aurich until Count Edzard II and his wife, Catherine of Sweden, established the countly residence there. According to Wiarda, the bustle of court life did not suit her temperament. She therefore left Aurich and returned to Norden, where she spent the remainder of her life. In 1563, while travelling between Aurich and Norden, Theda suffered a stroke. She died shortly afterwards as a result of the attack.

== Ancestors ==
Ancestors of Theda of East Frisia

16. Edzard II of Appingen-Greetsiel
8. Enno Edzardisna
17. Doda tom Brok
4. Ulrich I of East Frisia
18. Affo Beninga
9. Gela of Manslagt
19. Tiadeka of Berum
2. Edzard I, Count of East Frisia
20. Focko Ukena
10. Uko Fockena
21. Theda of Rheide
5. Theda Ukena
22. Lütet Attena
11. Heba Attena
23. Ocka tom Brok
1. Theda of East Frisia
24. Conrad IV, Count of Rietberg
12. Conrad V, Count of Rietberg
25. Irmgard of Diepholz
6. John I, Count of Rietberg
26. Gumprecht II of Neuenahr
13. Jacoba of Neuenahr
27. Margaret of Limburg-Broich
3. Elisabeth of Rietberg
28. Simon IV, Lord of Lippe
14. Bernard VII, Lord of Lippe
29. Margaret of Brunswick-Grubenhagen
7. Margaret of Lippe
30. Otto II, Count of Schaumburg
15. Anna of Holstein-Schauenburg
31. Elisabeth of Hohenstein

== See also ==
- House of Cirksena
- County of East Frisia
- List of counts of East Frisia
