= Ulrich of East Frisia =

Heir apparent of East Frisia

- Born: 1499
- Died: 1531 (aged 31–32); Hasselt
- Noble family: Cirksena
- Father: Edzard I
- Mother: Elisabeth of Rietberg

Ulrich of East Frisia (1499 - 1531 in Hasselt) was the eldest son of Count Edzard I of East Frisia and Countess Elisabeth of Rietberg. As the firstborn son, he was originally designated to succeed his father as ruler of the County of East Frisia. However, after returning from Spain, Ulrich became mentally incapacitated and was declared unfit to govern. As a result, his younger brother Enno II was appointed heir to the county instead.

== Life ==
=== Early life ===
Ulrich was born as the eldest son of Edzard I, Count of East Frisia and Elisabeth of Rietberg, daughter of Count John I of Rietberg. As the eldest son, Ulrich was raised as the expected successor to the County of East Frisia. Little is known about his youth. The surviving East Frisian chronicles contain almost no information concerning his education or political activities before the second decade of the sixteenth century.

=== Heir apparent ===
According to the succession ordinance issued by Count Edzard in 1512, the rule of East Frisia was to pass undivided to the eldest son, provided that he was capable of ruling. Younger sons were to receive financial appanages rather than shares of the government. Under this arrangement Ulrich was the undisputed heir to the county.

=== Marriage negotiations with Jever ===
During the succession crisis in the neighbouring Lordship of Jever, Count Edzard sought to unite Jever with East Frisia through marriage. A treaty concluded on 26 October 1517 stipulated that Ulrich would marry the eldest heiress, Anna of Jever. Should Anna die before the marriage, he would instead marry her sister Maria, and subsequently Dorothea if necessary. Only if Ulrich himself died before the marriage would his younger brother Enno replace him as bridegroom. If all three sons of Count Edzard were to die, Edzard himself would marry the eldest surviving heiress. The dowry was to consist of the Lordship of Jever, which would thereby be united with the County of East Frisia. Although the agreement was formally concluded, the planned marriage never took place.

=== Chamberlain of Charles V ===
In 1518 Ulrich accompanied his father, Count Edzard I, to the court of Charles II of Burgundy, the future Emperor Charles V. Charles appointed the young count as one of his chamberlains and granted him an annual pension of 1,000 guilders. When Edzard returned to East Frisia, Ulrich remained at the royal court and accompanied Charles to Spain. According to Eggerik Beninga, Edzard continued to send financial support to his son during his stay abroad.

=== Incapacity ===
The decisive turning point in Ulrich's life occurred after his return from Spain. Tileman Dothias Wiarda records that Ulrich "became mentally incapacitated" after returning from Spain. Because Ulrich was considered incapable of ruling, Count Edzard altered the succession. After consulting his councillors and the estates, Edzard reaffirmed the succession ordinance of 1512 and, on 6 December 1527, formally appointed his second son Enno as future ruler of East Frisia. Should Enno die without legitimate heirs, the succession was to pass to the youngest brother, Johan. In the official declaration, Edzard did not explicitly refer to Ulrich's mental condition. Instead, he diplomatically stated that Ulrich was not inclined to bear the burdens of government, thereby preserving the dignity of his eldest son.

=== Later life and death ===
After being passed over in the succession, Ulrich withdrew from public life. He resided at the monastery of Hasselt during the final years of his life. There is no indication in the contemporary chronicles that he exercised any further political influence after Count Edzard I had appointed his younger brother Enno as heir to the County of East Frisia. The exact date of Ulrich's death is uncertain.

== Ancestors ==
Ancestors of Ulrich of East Frisia

16. Edzard II of Appingen-Greetsiel
8. Enno Edzardisna
17. Doda tom Brok
4. Ulrich I of East Frisia
18. Affo Beninga
9. Gela of Manslagt
19. Tiadeka of Berum
2. Edzard I, Count of East Frisia
20. Focko Ukena
10. Uko Fockena
21. Theda of Rheide
5. Theda Ukena
22. Lütet Attena
11. Heba Attena
23. Ocka tom Brok
1. Ulrich of East Frisia
24. Conrad IV, Count of Rietberg
12. Conrad V, Count of Rietberg
25. Irmgard of Diepholz
6. John I, Count of Rietberg
26. Gumprecht II of Neuenahr
13. Jacoba of Neuenahr
27. Margaret of Limburg-Broich
3. Elisabeth of Rietberg
28. Simon IV, Lord of Lippe
14. Bernard VII, Lord of Lippe
29. Margaret of Brunswick-Grubenhagen
7. Margaret of Lippe
30. Otto II, Count of Schaumburg
15. Anna of Holstein-Schauenburg
31. Elisabeth of Hohenstein

== See also ==
- House of Cirksena
- County of East Frisia
- List of counts of East Frisia
