= Margaret of East Frisia =

East Frisian noblewoman (1500–1537)

- Born: 10 April 1500; Berum
- Died: 15 July 1537 (aged 37); Alt-Wildungen
- Noble family: Cirksena
- Father: Edzard I
- Mother: Elisabeth of Rietberg

Margarethe of East Frisia (10 April 1500 in Berum - 15 July 1537 in Alt-Wildungen) was, through her marriage to Count Philip IV, Countess of Waldeck-Wildungen.

== Life ==
Margarethe was a daughter of Count Edzard I of East Frisia and Elisabeth of Rietberg. She had six siblings, three brothers and three sisters, four of whom had already died by the time of their father's death in 1528.

In 1521, she travelled in the company of her relative Margarethe of Rietberg, the widow of Duke Frederick III of Brunswick-Calenberg-Göttingen, to the Diet of Worms. There she met Philip IV of Waldeck-Wildungen and became engaged to him while still in Worms. The couple married in Emden on 17 February 1523. As her dowry, Margarethe's parents paid the comparatively large sum of 8,000 Rhenish guilders. The marriage produced nine children, including Margaretha von Waldeck (1533–1554), whose fate, according to the Hessian teacher and local historian Eckhard Sander, served as the basis for the fairy tale of Snow White.

Margarethe died in childbirth in 1537 following the birth of her daughter Esther. She was buried in the Church of Niederwildungen.

== Family ==
On the 17 February 1523 in Emden, she married Philipp IV of Waldeck-Wildungen (born: 1493; died: 30 November 1574), a son of Count Henry VIII of Waldeck-Wildungen and Anastasia of Runkel. They had the following children:

- Ernst (born: 1523 or 1524; died: 1527)
- Elizabeth (born: 10 December 1525; died: 30 March 1543 at Waldeck Castle), married in 1542 with Count Reinhard of Isenburg (died: 28 February 1568)
- Samuel (born: 2 May 1528 at Waldeck Castle; died: 6 January 1570 at Friedrichstein Castle in Bad Wildungen), married on 8 October 1554 with Anna Maria (1538–1583), daughter of Count Henry XXXII of Schwarzburg-Blankenburg.
- Daniel, Count of Waldeck-Wildungen (born: 1 August 1530; died: 7 June 1577 in Waldeck); he succeeded Philip as the ruling Count of Waldeck-Wildungen and married on 11 November 1568 with Barbara of Hesse (1536–1597), daughter of Landgrave Philip I of Hesse and widow of Duke George I of Württemberg-Montbéliard
- Henry IX, Count of Waldeck-Wildungen (born: 10 December 1531; died: 3 October 1577 in Werbe (now part of Waldeck)), married on 19 December 1563 with Anna of Viermund (died: 17 April 1599)
- Margaret (born: 1533; died: 1554 in Brussels)
- Frederick (born: 1534; died: 1557 in St. Quentin)
- Anastasia (born: 1536; died: 1561 in Heidelberg)
- Esther (born: 1537 in Bad Wildungen; died: probably in 1537)

== Ancestors ==
Ancestors of Margaret of East Frisia

16. Edzard II of Appingen-Greetsiel
8. Enno Edzardisna
17. Doda tom Brok
4. Ulrich I of East Frisia
18. Affo Beninga
9. Gela of Manslagt
19. Tiadeka of Berum
2. Edzard I, Count of East Frisia
20. Focko Ukena
10. Uko Fockena
21. Theda of Rheide
5. Theda Ukena
22. Lütet Attena
11. Heba Attena
23. Ocka tom Brok
1. Margaret of East Frisia
24. Conrad IV, Count of Rietberg
12. Conrad V, Count of Rietberg
25. Irmgard of Diepholz
6. John I, Count of Rietberg
26. Gumprecht II of Neuenahr
13. Jacoba of Neuenahr
27. Margaret of Limburg-Broich
3. Elisabeth of Rietberg
28. Simon IV, Lord of Lippe
14. Bernard VII, Lord of Lippe
29. Margaret of Brunswick-Grubenhagen
7. Margaret of Lippe
30. Otto II, Count of Schaumburg
15. Anna of Holstein-Schauenburg
31. Elisabeth of Hohenstein

== See also ==
- House of Cirksena
- County of East Frisia
- List of counts of East Frisia
