= Johan I of East Frisia =

Imperial governor of the Duchy of Limburg

- Born: 1506
- Died: 1572 (aged 65–66)
- Noble family: Cirksena
- Spouse: Dorothea of Austria
- Father: Edzard I
- Mother: Elisabeth of Rietberg

Johan I of East Frisia (1506–1572) was a member of the house of Cirksena and a non-reigning Count of East Frisia and later imperial governor of Limburg. His father, Edzard the Great, had introduced primogeniture in the county of East Frisia, so that his older brother Enno II of East Frisia inherited the county alone and he had to hold back. Despite his ambitions, he always acknowledged his brother's rights and did not dispute the inheritance.

Unlike his father and his brother, Johan remained a Catholic. After his father's death, he joined the imperial army. However, he soon returned to East Frisia and began supporting his brother. He had, however, little positive impact on his brother, who ruled unwisely. Johan was unable to distinguish himself, and also took some unwise and ill-advised actions, such as those that lead to the Gueldrian Feud. He may also have encouraged Enno to try to re-introduce Catholicism in East Frisia. This attempt was cut short when Enno died in 1540. Enno's widow, Anna became regent for her son Edzard II. Johan had an endless series of conflicts with Anna.

In 1538, Johan married Dorothea of Austria, the illegitimate daughter of Emperor Maximilian I. In 1543, Emperor Charles V reminded Johan of the fact that he was still, technically, in the imperial service. Charles appointed Johan stadtholder of the Duchy of Limburg and the Lands of Overmaas. Moreover, he became drossaard (judge and prime minister) of the Valkenburg Castle.

His descendants lived at Coldeborg Castle in the Rheiderland and were financially supported by the counts of East Frisia.

== Ancestors ==
Ancestors of Johan I of East Frisia

16. Edzard II of Appingen-Greetsiel
8. Enno Edzardisna
17. Doda tom Brok
4. Ulrich I of East Frisia
18. Affo Beninga
9. Gela of Manslagt
19. Tiadeka of Berum
2. Edzard I, Count of East Frisia
20. Focko Ukena
10. Uko Fockena
21. Theda of Rheide
5. Theda Ukena
22. Lütet Attena
11. Heba Attena
23. Ocka tom Brok
1. Johan I, Count of East Frisia
24. Conrad IV, Count of Rietberg
12. Conrad V, Count of Rietberg
25. Irmgard of Diepholz
6. John I, Count of Rietberg
26. Gumprecht II of Neuenahr
13. Jacoba of Neuenahr
27. Margaret of Limburg-Broich
3. Elisabeth of Rietberg
28. Simon IV, Lord of Lippe
14. Bernard VII, Lord of Lippe
29. Margaret of Brunswick-Grubenhagen
7. Margaret of Lippe
30. Otto II, Count of Schaumburg
15. Anna of Holstein-Schauenburg
31. Elisabeth of Hohenstein

== References and sources ==
- Tielke, Martin (ed.): Biographisches Lexikon für Ostfriesland, Ostfriesisches Landschaftliche Verlag- u. Vertriebsgeschäft, Aurich, vol. 1 ISBN 3-925365-75-3 (1993), vol. 2 ISBN 3-932206-00-2 (1997), vol. 3 ISBN 3-932206-22-3 (2001)
