= Enno II of East Frisia =

Enno II
- Count of East Frisia
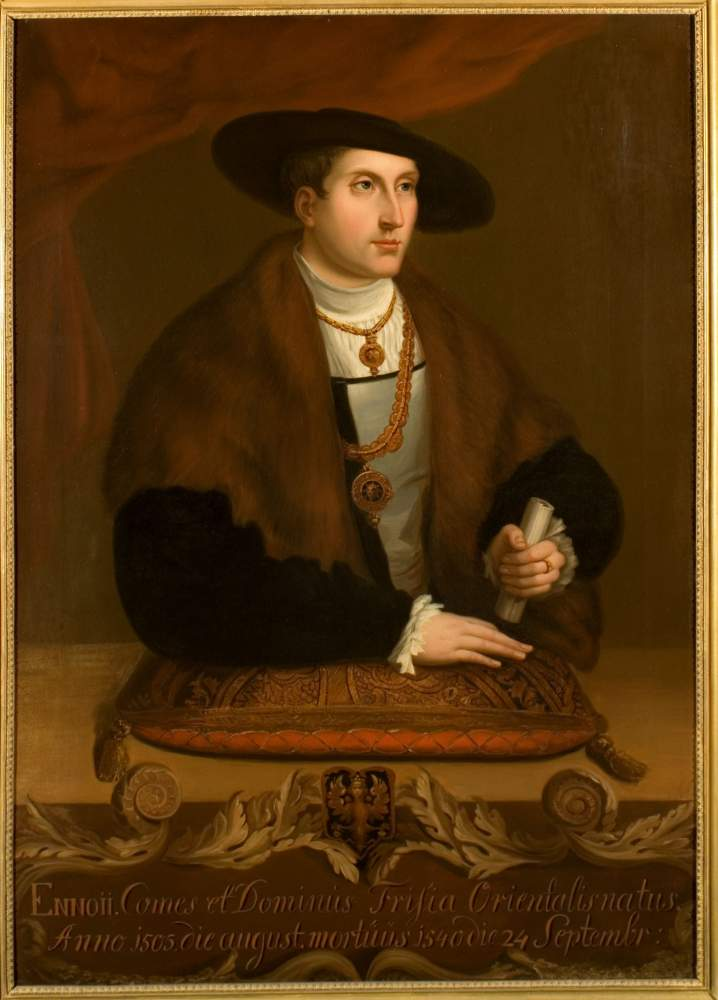
- Enno II, Count of East Frisia

Count of East Frisia
- Reign: 14 February 1528 - 24 September 1540
- Predecessor: Edzard I
- Successor: Anna of Oldenburg (as regent)
- Born: 1505
- Died: 24 September 1540 (aged 34–35); Emden
- Burial: Great Church of Emden
- Spouse: Anna of Oldenburg
- House: Cirksena
- Father: Edzard I
- Mother: Elisabeth of Rietberg
- Religion: Lutheranism

Enno II of East Frisia (1505 – 24 September 1540 in Emden) was a 16th century Frisian noble. He was the son of Edzard I of East Frisia. In 1528 he became count of East Frisia. For most of his life he ruled together with Johan I of East Frisia, who remained Catholic, while Enno was Lutheran.

Enno II lost Jever because he failed to fulfill the marriage obligations his father had arranged for him to Maria of Jever. Enno and his brother Johan were supposed to marry the heirs of Jever, but Enno broke off the arrangement, which greatly offended Maria of Jever, who as a result became a lifelong enemy of Enno. She made sure that Jever was given to the County of Oldenburg after her death.

Enno also voluntarily relinquished Butjadingen at his marriage to Anna of Oldenburg (1501–1575). Only the Lordships of Esens, Stedesdorf and Wittmund remained, ruled by the aggressive chieftain, Balthasar Oomkens von Esens. Enno drove out Balthasar in 1530, but he returned and devastated East Frisia with help from the duke of Guelders in a conflicht known as the Gueldrian Feud. Enno was forced to recognise Balthasar as Lord of Esens, Stedesdorf and Wittmund. Enno did not come out well from his feud with Guelders. Enno played an important role in the attacks on the numerous East Frisian abbeys and monasteries. He confiscated their possessions to finance his wars. Enno died at the age of 35, and his wife Anna of Oldenburg became regent for their sons.

== Marriage and children ==
Enno II married Anna of Oldenburg. Together they had the following children:

- Elisabeth, 1531–1555, married in 1553 count Johann V of Schaumburg-Pinneberg (1531–1560)
- Edzard II, 1532–1599
- Hedwig, 1535–1616, married in 1562 to duke Otto II of Brunswick-Harburg (1528–1603)
- Anna, 1534–1552
- Christoffel, 1536–1566
- Johan II, 1538–1591.

== Ancestors ==
Ancestors of Enno II of East Frisia

16. Edzard II of Appingen-Greetsiel
8. Enno Edzardisna
17. Doda tom Brok
4. Ulrich I of East Frisia
18. Affo Beninga
9. Gela of Manslagt
19. Tiadeka of Berum
2. Edzard I, Count of East Frisia
20. Focko Ukena
10. Uko Fockena
21. Theda of Rheide
5. Theda Ukena
22. Lütet Attena
11. Heba Attena
23. Ocka tom Brok
1. Enno II, Count of East Frisia
24. Conrad IV, Count of Rietberg
12. Conrad V, Count of Rietberg
25. Irmgard of Diepholz
6. John I, Count of Rietberg
26. Gumprecht II of Neuenahr
13. Jacoba of Neuenahr
27. Margaret of Limburg-Broich
3. Elisabeth of Rietberg
28. Simon IV, Lord of Lippe
14. Bernard VII, Lord of Lippe
29. Margaret of Brunswick-Grubenhagen
7. Margaret of Lippe
30. Otto II, Count of Schaumburg
15. Anna of Holstein-Schauenburg
31. Elisabeth of Hohenstein

== See also ==
Enno II of East Frisia Cirksena Born: 1505 Died: 24 September 1544
Preceded by Edzard I	Count of East Frisia; 1528–1540	Succeeded by Anna of Oldenburg as Regent
