= Origin of the Snow White tale =

Influences on the fairy tale

"Snow White" is a German fairy tale known across much of the world. There has been debate over possible origins of the tale and whether it could be an amalgam of other stories, have mythical roots, or be inspired by a real person. It falls within the classification of Type 709 in the Aarne–Thompson–Uther Index.

== History ==
The Brothers Grimm published Snow White in 1812 in the first edition of their collection Grimms' Fairy Tales. It was titled in German: Sneewittchen (in modern orthography Schneewittchen) and numbered as Tale 53. They completed their final revision of the story in 1854.

According to Christine Shojaei Kawan, the Grimms' version of the tale combines stories collected from at least three different informants: their friend Marie Hassenpflug and the collectors Ferdinand Siebert and Heinrich Leopold Stein. The Grimms also knew of eight other German variants. One theory holds that Snow White was an original creation by the Grimms’ younger brother Ferdinand. However, this is disproven by the existence of earlier adaptations such as “Richilde”, a 1782 version by Johann Karl August Musäus.

Some earlier recorded tales share elements of the Snow White story, such as the Malay Syair Bidasari and the Italian “The Young Slave”.

== Theories ==
=== Amalgamation ===
Beginning with Ernst Böklen's seminal study Schneewittchenstudien in 1915, folklorists have noted that the tale of Snow White (and by extension, tale type ATU 709) shows a combination of motifs present in other folktales: the children in the woods (ATU 327, "Children and the Ogre" and or "Hansel and Gretel"); a heroine cursed into a deep sleep (ATU 410, "Sleeping Beauty"); treacherous sisters (ATU 510, "Cinderella", and, "One-Eye, Two-Eyes, and Three-Eyes"); a house in the woods (ATU 451, "The Seven Ravens").

Folklorist Joseph Jacobs, in Europa's Fairy Book, in his commentaries, considered "Snow White" a later tale influenced or contaminated by these other stories. Scholar Sigrid Schmidt reached a similar conclusion regarding the story after comparing European and African variants.

=== Mythical parallels ===
Scholar Graham Anderson suggested that the story of Snow White had ancient mythical roots and compared it to the Roman legend of Chione, recorded in Ovid's Metamorphoses. The name Chione means "Snow" in Greek and, in the story, she is described as the most beautiful woman in the land, so beautiful that the gods Apollo and Mercury both fell in love with her. Mercury put her to sleep with the touch of his caduceus and raped her in her sleep. Then Apollo, disguised as an old crone, approached her and raped her again. This led Chione to openly boast that she was more beautiful than the goddess Diana herself, resulting in Diana shooting her through the tongue with an arrow.

=== Historical inspiration ===
Several German towns have laid claim to the origins of the fairy tale as part of tourism campaigns. As of 2009, the most active and well-known were Bad Wildungen and Lohr am Main. These two towns stood out by connecting the fairy tale to local historical figures, namely 16th-century countess Margaretha von Waldeck and 18th-century baroness Maria Sophia von Erthal.

==== Margaretha von Waldeck ====
In 1994, the German historian Eckhard Sander published Schneewittchen: Märchen oder Wahrheit? (Snow White: Fairy Tale or True Story?), claiming he had uncovered an account that may have inspired the Grimms' fairy tale. After hearing a tour guide claim that workers in the mining town of Bergfreiheit had inspired the seven dwarfs, Sander set out to prove that Snow White had originated in that area. According to Sander, the character of Snow White was based on the life of Margaretha von Waldeck, daughter of Philip IV, Count of Waldeck-Wildungen (1493–1574) and his first wife, Countess Margaret Cirksena of Ostfriesland (1500–1537), daughter of Edzard I, Count of East Frisia. According to Bad Wildungen city documents, she was famous for her beauty.

By 1539, Margaretha had a stepmother, Katharina von Hatzfeld (1510–1546). Perhaps soon after, Margaretha was sent to be raised at nearby Weilburg at the court of Philip III, Count of Nassau-Weilburg. In 1545, she traveled through the Siebengebirge ("seven hills") to live with her mother's brother Johann Cirksena (1506–1572) at Valkenburg Castle, in present-day Limburg, Netherlands. In 1549, her father sent her to the Brussels court of Mary of Hungary, governor of the Habsburg Netherlands and sister of Charles V, Holy Roman Emperor. Margaretha's presence at the court was partially meant to improve the relationship of her father with the emperor and help the release of Philip I, Landgrave of Hesse, who had been imprisoned in Brussels for his role in the Schmalkaldic War.

At court, several high-ranking men vied for Margaretha's attention, including Lamoral, Count of Egmont. Crown Prince Philip, son of Charles V, arrived at his aunt's court in 1549. He reportedly pursued Margaretha during the few months he was there, as well, though no official relationship could occur, as she was Lutheran. Three surviving letters from Margaretha to her father show that her health declined steadily over the next few years and she died at the age of 21 in March 1554. Rumors held that her death was caused by poison. However, unlike Snow White, Margaretha's stepmother could not have been involved since her father's second wife died in 1546 and he remarried again in October 1554.

Margaretha's father owned several copper mines. A majority of workers were children, and Sander suggested that the legendary seven dwarfs were inspired by child labor in the mine. Sander connected the residence of the seven dwarfs to the former copper-mining village Bergfreiheit, now a district of Bad Wildungen that calls itself Schneewittchendorf (Snow White Village) as part of its tourism industry. Like the fairy tale's dwarfs, the child laborers there used to live in large groups (about 20) in a single room house.

Sander theorized that other elements of the fairy tale were drawn from local folklore and different members of Margaretha's family. For instance, the wicked mother figure paralleled the relationship of Margaretha's sister-in-law and niece, and the wedding of Snow White paralleled the wedding of Margaretha's nephew. Both Margaretha's niece and niece-in-law shared her name.

==== Maria Sophia von Erthal ====
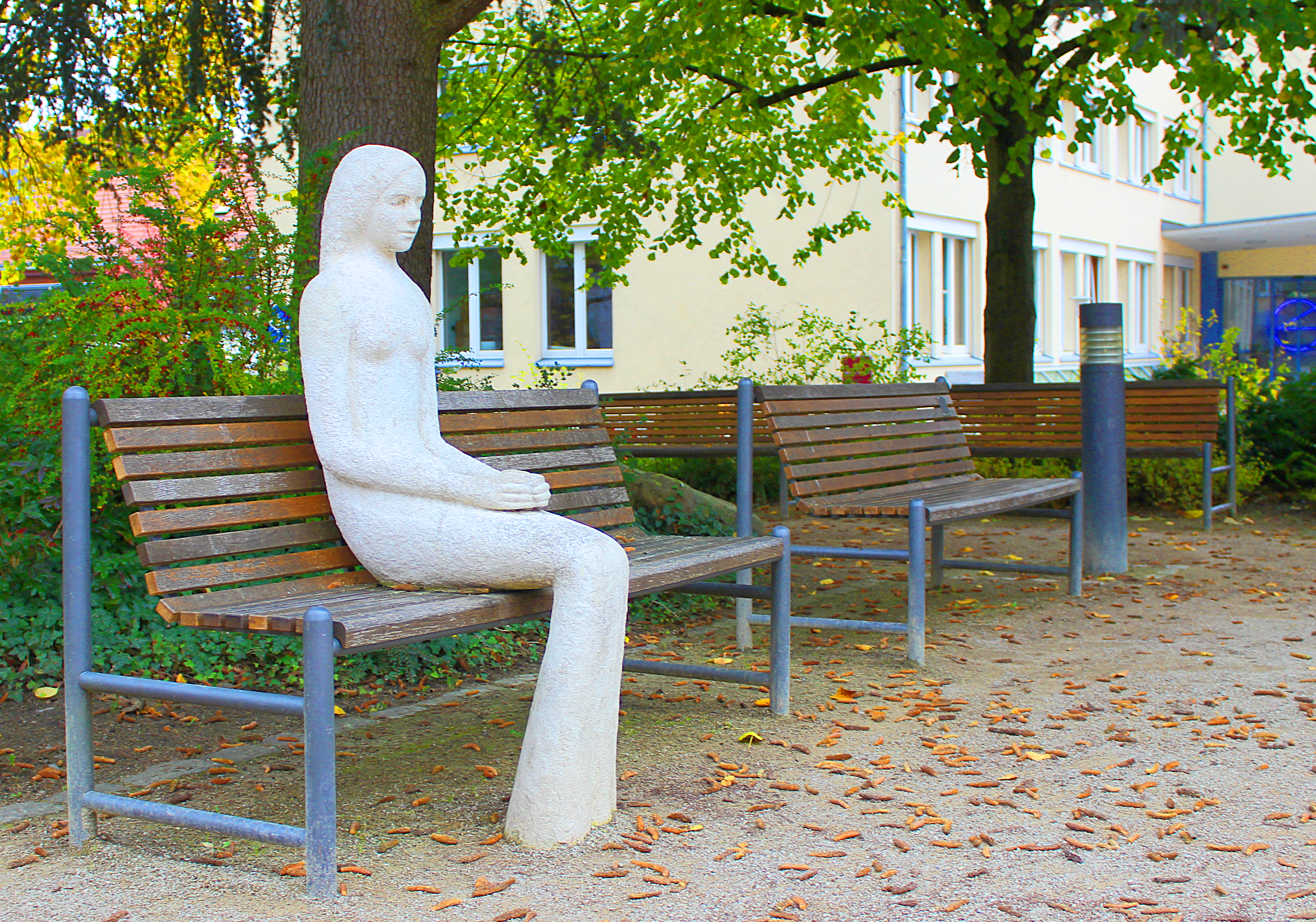
A Lohr am Main statue of Snow White

Karlheinz Bartels, a pharmacist from Lohr am Main in northwestern Bavaria, was part of a "study group" made up of friends who met regularly at a local pub. Inspired by a previous hoax which claimed to trace the real-life inspirations of Hansel and Gretel, he created a tongue-in-cheek theory that Snow White was Maria Sophia Margarethe Catharina, Baroness von und zu Erthal, born in Lohr on 25 June 1725. Her father, Philipp Christoph von und zu Erthal, was the local representative of the Prince Elector of Mainz. After the death of Maria Sophia's birth mother in 1738, her father remarried in 1743.

In 1992, Bartels' fellow theorist and local museum head Werner Loibl analyzed a surviving letter from the stepmother, Claudia Elisabeth von Reichenstein, which revealed that she answered Philipp Christoph's mail and handled important decisions while he was traveling abroad. Based on this, Loibl extrapolated that she was domineering and favored her children from her first marriage. Also in 1992, Loibl unveiled a Snow White-themed exhibit at the Spessart Museum in Lohr Castle (once owned by Philipp Christoph).

Mirrors made in Lohr were said to always tell the truth due to their high quality and smooth surfaces that were unusually clear for the time. Lohr Castle was home to one such mirror during the time that Maria Sophia's stepmother lived there. Supporters of the theory compared it to the Magic Mirror in "Snow White." It was constructed by the Mirror Manufacture of the Electorate of Mainz in Lohr, and may have been in the castle as early as 1719. It can still be viewed there today.

The dwarfs in Maria's story are also linked to a mining town, Bieber, located just west of Lohr and set among seven mountains. The smallest tunnels could only be accessed by very short miners, who often wore bright hoods, as the dwarfs have frequently been depicted over the years. The Lohr study group maintains that the glass coffin may be linked to the region's famous glassworks, while the poisoned apple may be associated with the deadly nightshade poison that grows in abundance in Lohr.

Despite the joking origins of Bartels's theory, it became popular as a marketing tactic for the local town. Maria's gravestone was found in 2019.

==== Criticism of historical theories ====
Virtually no serious scholars agree with Sander's or Bartels's theories. As stated by Professor Donald Haase, "There have been a couple of attempts to show that the story of Snow White is based on the fate of an historical figure, but they are pure speculation and not at all convincing."

Bartels’ theory in particular is recognized as a joke. Ruth Bottigheimer also noted that Maria Sophia von Erthal was born too late to have significant influence on the fairy tale, with motifs like the glass coffin already appearing in literature by the 17th century.

== See also ==
- The Truth About Hansel and Gretel
