= Elisabeth of Rietberg =

Countess consort of East Frisia
- Reign: 27 July 1497 – 13 June 1512
- Predecessor: Theda Ukena
- Successor: Anna of Oldenburg
- Born: c. 1483
- Died: 13 June 1512
- Spouse: Edzard I of East Frisia (m. 1497)
- Issue Detail: Ulrich of East Frisia; Margaret of East Frisia; Theda of East Frisia; Enno II of East Frisia; Johan I of East Frisia; Anna of East Frisia; Armgard of East Frisia
- House: Werl-Arnsberg-Cuyk
- Father: John I of Rietberg
- Mother: Margaret of Lippe

Elisabeth of Rietberg (c. 1483 – 13 June 1512) was the wife of Edzard I of East Frisia and served as countess of East Frisia.

== Biography ==
Elisabeth was the daughter of John I of Rietberg (c. 1450–1516) and his wife Margaret of Lippe. Her paternal uncle was Konrad of Rietberg, Prince-Bishop of Münster. His predecessor, Henry XXVII Schwarzburg, had exercised old comital rights in the East Frisian Emsgau, but transferred these rights to Count Edzard in return for a payment of 10,000 guilders.

Edzard concluded a commercial treaty with Bishop Konrad and further strengthened their relationship by seeking Elisabeth of Rietberg's hand in marriage. At the same time, the marriage demonstrated Edzard's growing aristocratic self-confidence, as he became the first ruler of East Frisia to marry into the non-Frisian nobility

Following Elisabeth's early death in 1512, Edzard introduced primogeniture in East Frisia.

== Marriage and children ==
Edzard and Elisabeth were married on 27 July 1497. They had seven children: four daughters and three sons:

- Ulrich of East Frisia (1499-1532)
- Margaret of East Frisia (1500–1537), married with Philipp IV, Count of Waldeck Margaret became the mother of Margaretha von Waldeck. Margaretha von Waldeck was believed to be the inspiration of Snow White.
- Theda of East Frisia (1502-1563)
- Enno II of East Frisia (1505–1540)
- Johan I of East Frisia (1506–1572)
- Anna of East Frisia (?-1530)
- Armgard of East Frisia (?-1559)
