= List of abbots of Marienfeld =

The Marienfeld Abbey has had the following 48 abbots from 1185 to 1803:

Image	Number	From	To	Name
	1	1185	1191	Eggehardus
	2	1191	1194	Godfridus
	3	1194	1211	Florentius von der Lippe
	4	1211	1214	Liborius
	5	1214	1220	Giselbertus
	6	1220	1226	Winricus
	7	1226	1230	Wichboldus
	8	1230	1255	Rudolphus
	9	1255	1290	Johannes I.
	10	1290	1294	Winandus
	11	1294	1321	Ludbertus von Boderike (von Büderich)
	12	1321	1322	Welderus
	13	1322	1344	Nikolaus von Münster
	14	1344	1357	Bernardus
	15	1357	1360	Johannes II.
	16	1360	1369	Johannes III. tho den Velde
	17	1369	1376	Wilhelmus
	18	1376	1385	Sibertus
	19	1385	1397	Johannes IV. Seveken
	20	1397	1401	Erenfridus
	21	1401	1410	Gerlacus von Unna
	22	1410	1443	Hermannus von Warendorf
	23	1443	1478	Arnoldus von Bevern
	24	1478	1495	Johannes V. Wineken
	25	1495	1498	Wernerus von Hameln
	26	1498	1537	Henricus Münstermann
	27	1537	1542	Arnoldus Thomdrecke
	28	1543	1553	Johannes Vrigge
	29	1553	1558	Johannes Faber
	30	1558	1564	Christopherus Friederici
	31	1564	1597	Hermannus Fromme
	32	1597	1598	Johannes Tropp
	33	1598	1600	Georgius Rhode
	34	1603	1610	Hermannus Koelte
	35	1610	1634	Requinus Runde
	36	1634	1646	Johannes von Werden
Jodocus Caesem	37	1646	1661	Jodocus Caesem
Johannes Stades	38	1661	1681	Johannes Stades
Bernardus Cuelmann	39	1681	1705	Bernardus Cuelmann
Johannes Rulle	40	1705	1713	Johannes Rulle
Everhardus Gallenkamp	41	1713	1717	Everhardus Gallenkamp
Ferdinandus Oesterhoff	42	1717	1746	Ferdinandus Oesterhoff
Florentinus Reinking	43	1746	1756	Florentinus Reinking
Bernardus Estinghausen	44	1756	1769	Bernardus Estinghausen
Arnoldus Detten	45	1769	1774	Arnoldus Detten
Wilhelmus Crone	46	1774	1784	Wilhelmus Crone
	47	1784	1794	Stephanus Pöttken
Petrus von Hatzfeld	48	1794	1803	Petrus von Hatzfeld

== Literature ==
- Wilhelm Kohl: Die Zisterzienserabtei Marienfeld
