= Otto II of Rietberg =

Otto II, Count of Rietberg
- Died: 18 July 1389
- Buried: Marienfeld Abbey
- Noble family: Werl-Arnsberg-Cuyk
- Spouse: Adelaide of Lippe
- Issue Detail: Conrad IV, Count of Rietberg
- Father: Conrad III, Count of Rietberg
- Mother: Ermeswint of Reifferscheidt

Otto II, Count of Rietberg (died 18 July 1389) was the ruling Count of Rietberg from 1365 until his death.

== Life ==
He was the son of Conrad III and his wife Ermeswint of Reifferscheidt.

He inherited Rietberg when his father died in 1365.

He died on 18 July 1389 and was buried in the Marienfeld Abbey.

== Marriage and issue ==
Around 1370, Otto II married Adelaide, the daughter of Otto of Lippe from the neighboring County of Lippe. They had the following children:

- Conrad IV, who was Count of Rietberg from 1389 to 1428
- John, a canon of Cologne, who fell in the Battle of Detern on 27 September 1426
- Otto (d. between 6 July and 7 October 1406), Bishop of Minden from 1403 until his death

Otto II of Rietberg Werl-Arnsberg-Cuyk
Preceded by Conrad III	Count of Rietberg; 1365–1389	Succeeded by Conrad IV
