= Conrad V =

Conrad V or Konrad V may refer to:

- Conrad V of Eberstein (died 1245), bishop of Speyer
- Conradin (died 1268), sometimes numbered Conrad V
- Conrad V of Teck (died 1386), duke of Teck
- Konrad von Hebenstreit (died 1412), bishop of Freising as Konrad V
- Konrad V Kantner (died 1439), Silesian duke
- Conrad V, Count of Rietberg (died 1472)
