= Johann Christoph Rincklake =

German painter (1764–1813)

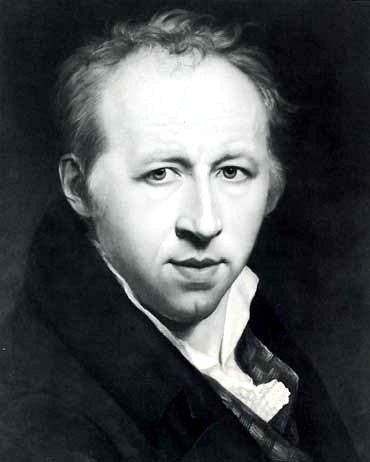
Rincklake's final self-portrait

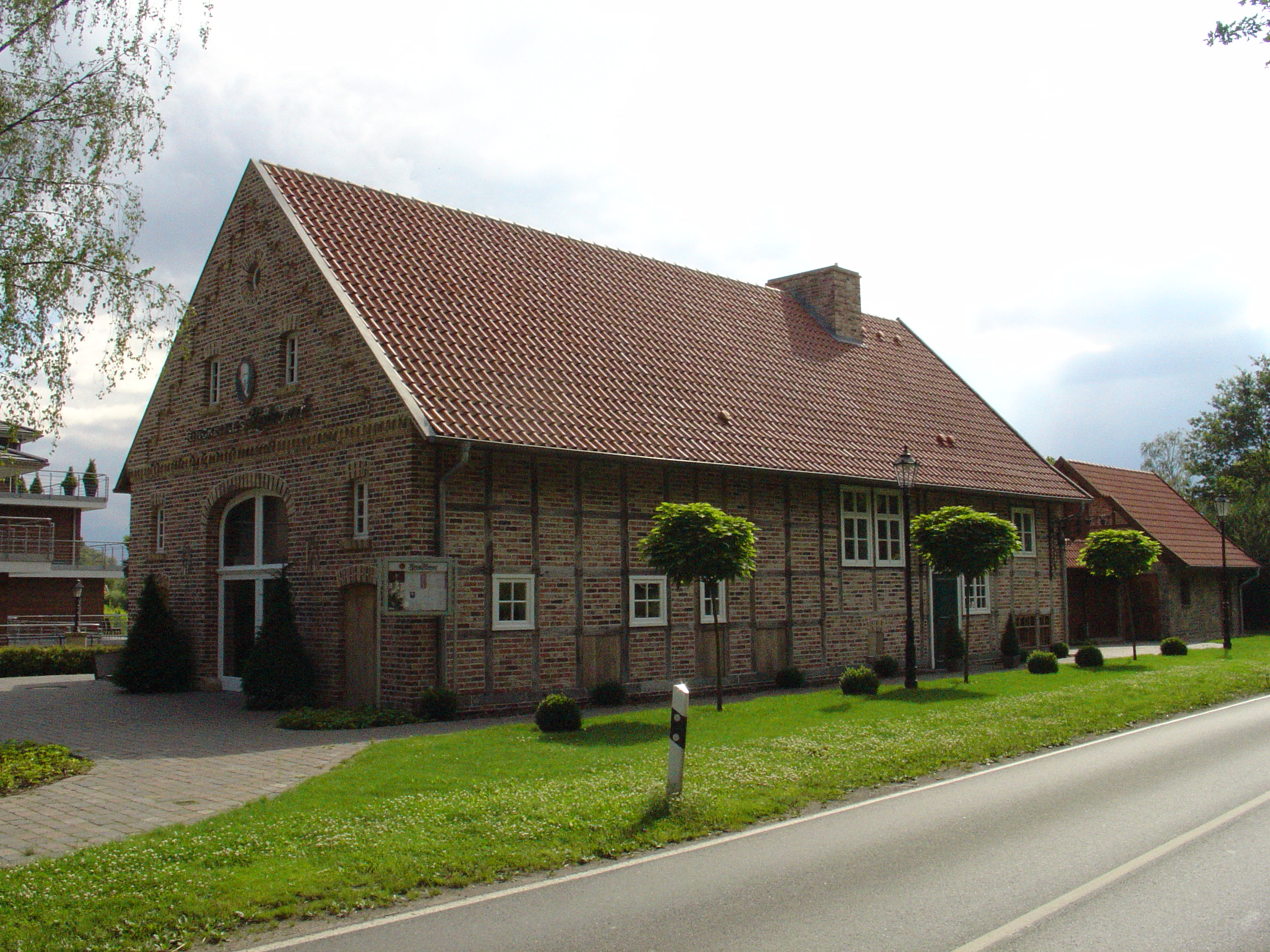
Birthplace of Johann Christoph Rincklake (originally stood in Harsewinkel, moved to near Marienfeld Abbey in summer 2005)

Johann Christoph Rincklake (19 October 1764 – 19 June 1813) was a German portrait painter of the Romantic era.

== Life ==
He was born in Harsewinkel. The son of a carpenter, he took an apprenticeship then began training as an artist, studying at Berlin's Prussian Academy of Arts and the painting academies in Vienna, Frankfurt am Main and Düsseldorf, spending a few years in each. In 1800 he married Marianne Wermerskirch. They had five children and lived together in Münster.

He painted portraits of several noble and civic figures in North Rhine Westphalia, including Franz von Fürstenberg, count Friedrich Leopold zu Stolberg-Stolberg, Gebhard Leberecht von Blücher, Freiherr vom Stein and princess Pauline zur Lippe, as well as several families from Münster and Petrus von Hatzfeld, the last abbot of Marienfeld Abbey. He also painted portraits of working-class subjects – an innkeeper's daughter, a locksmith's son, a baker to the cathedral chapter, a tutor and a singer in the Prince-Bishop's Chapel.

Rincklake died in 1813 in Münster. Several of his paintings have been catalogued (including those by him in the Landesmuseum in Münster), but others are lost or missing.

== Gallery ==
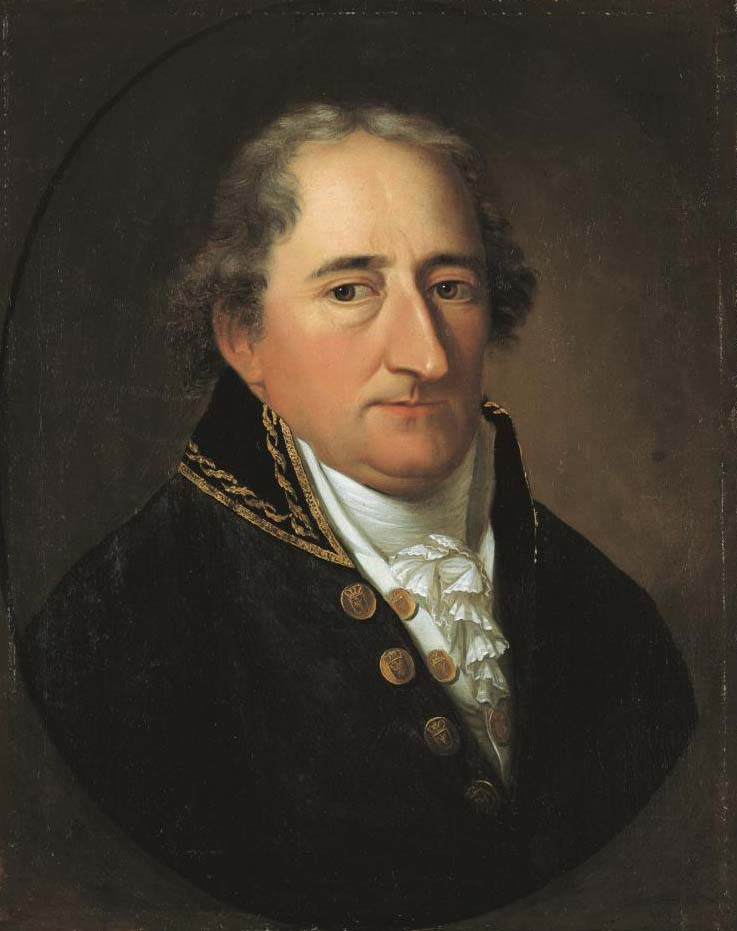
Freiherr vom Stein

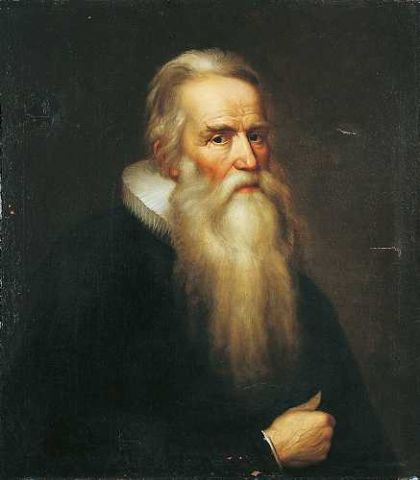
Old man in Dutch clothing

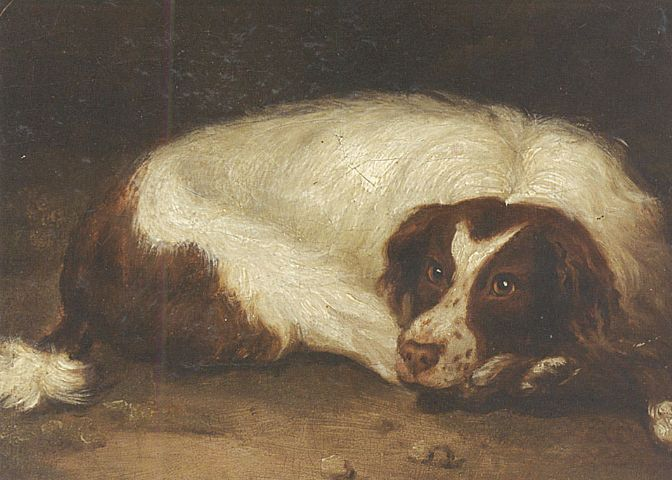
A sporting dog lying down

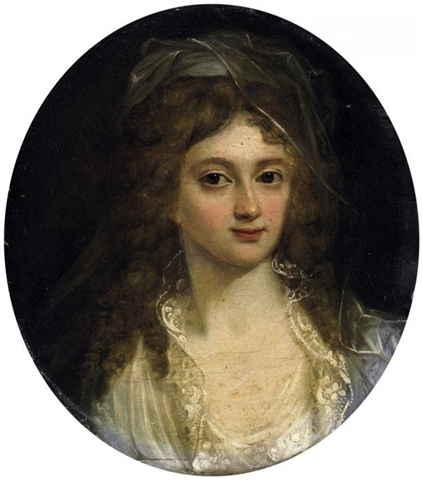
Portrait of Maria Arnoldina Henriette Apollonia v. Borggreve, wife of Clemens-August II v. Detten

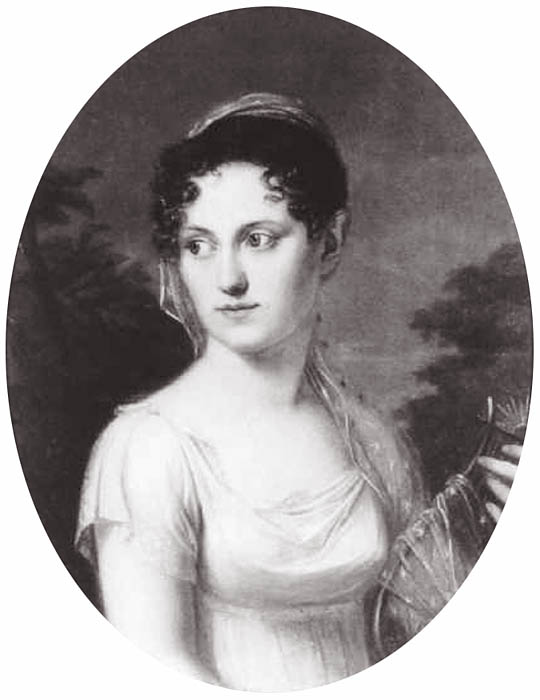
Katharina Sibylla Schücking née Busch

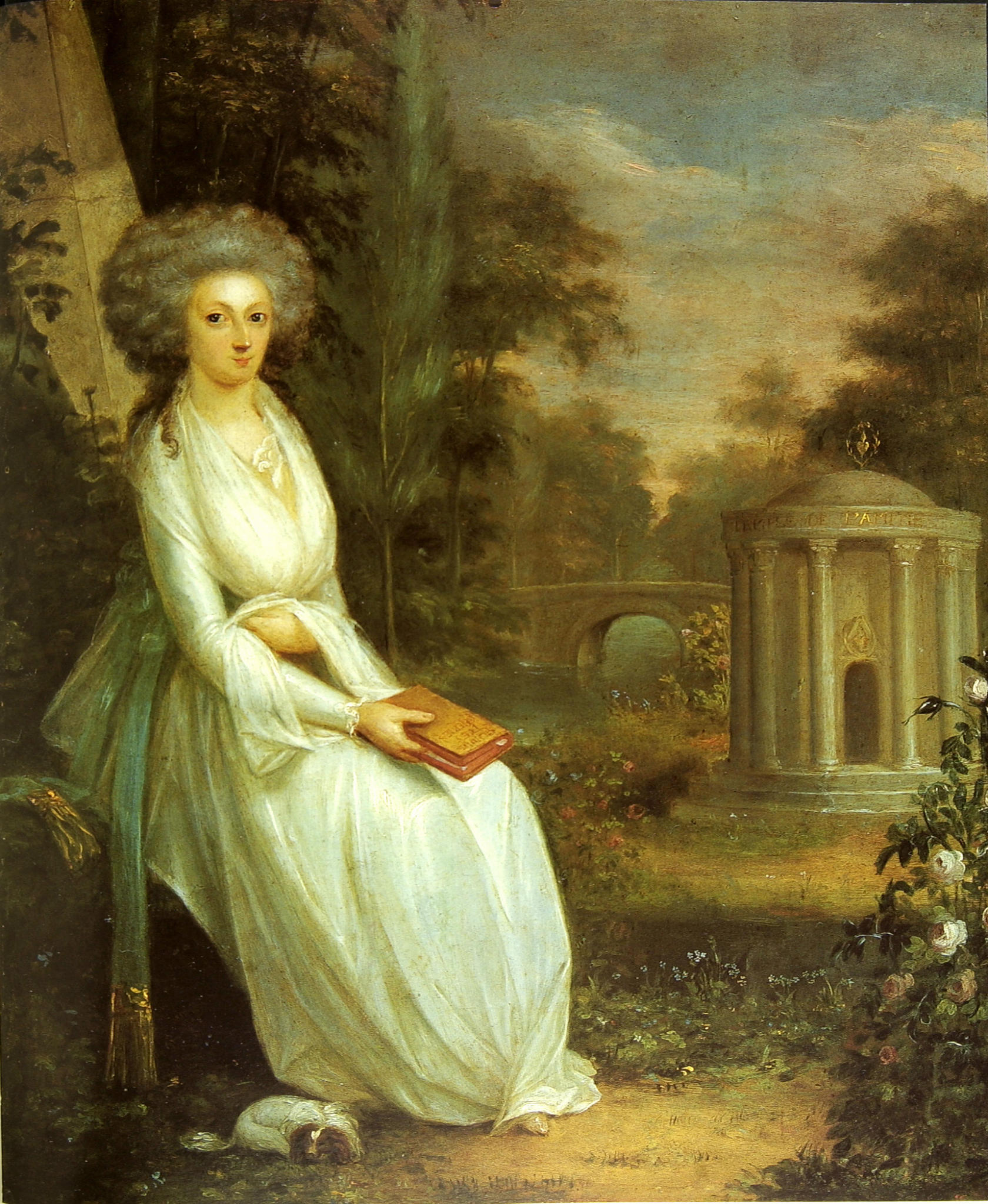
Rosine Alexandrine Freiin von Korff Schmising in a park

== Bibliography ==
- (in German) Hildegard Westhoff-Krummacher: Johann Christoph Rincklake - Ein westfälischer Bildnismaler um 1800, Deutscher Kunstverlag, 1984, ISBN 978-3-422-00754-3
