= Magic Mirror (Snow White) =

Mystical object in the story of Snow White

- Snow White element
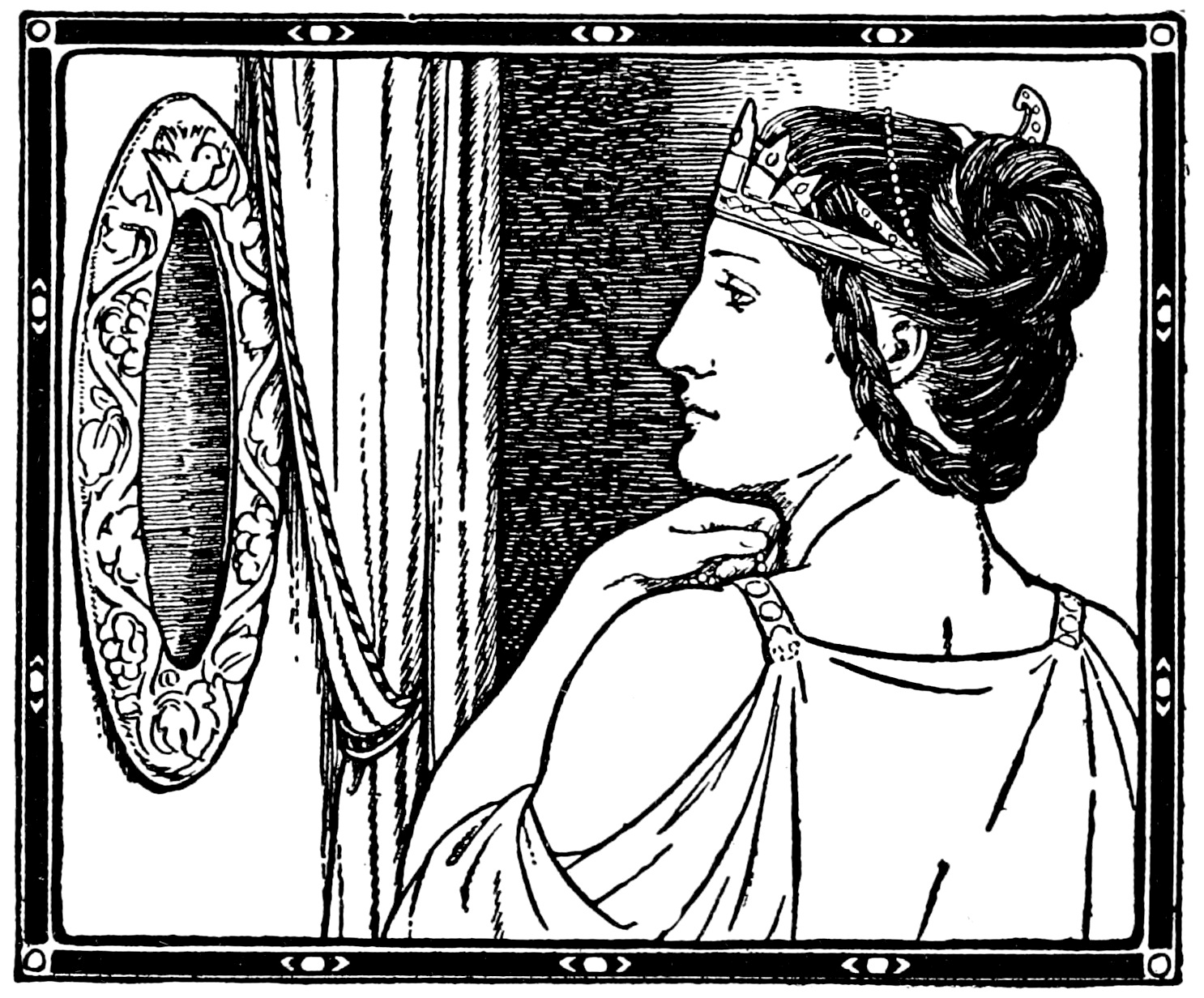
- The Evil Queen in front of the Mirror. Illustration by John Batten for Joseph Jacobs's Europa's Fairy Book (1916).
- First appearance: Snow White; 1812
- Created by: Brothers Grimm
- Genre: Fairy tale

In-universe information
- Type: Magical mirror
- Owners: The Evil Queen
- Function: Tells the user who is the fairest in the land
- Traits and abilities: Talking mirror

The Magic Mirror is a mystical object that is featured in the story of Snow White, depicted as either a hand mirror or a wall-mounted mirror. The mirror has been interpreted as the voice of Snow White's father, who is judging between the beauty of his wife and daughter.

== Fairy tale ==
The Magic Mirror belongs to the Evil Queen, who constantly asks it—usually in a rhyming phrase—who is the fairest in the land. When the mirror eventually identifies her young stepdaughter Snow White as the fairest, the Queen jealously tries to have her killed, first via her huntsman, then several personal attempts concluding with a poisoned apple. The mirror is key to her plots; it tells her Snow White's location, and after each attempt, she checks with the mirror and is again told that Snow White remains the fairest. At the very end, when Snow White is married, the mirror tells her that the young queen is the most beautiful. The Evil Queen is terrified, but her jealousy drives her to attend the wedding where she finds that the Prince's bride is Snow White. She is caught trying to cause discord and the Prince had her dance in red-hot iron slippers until she drops dead.

== Analysis ==
In other versions of the tale from around the world, a person, an animal, or the moon may play the same role as the magic mirror, informing the villain that the heroine is more beautiful. The mirror has been interpreted as the voice of Snow White's father judging between the beauty of his wife and daughter.

== Modern adaptations ==
=== Disney ===
==== Disney's Snow White franchise ====
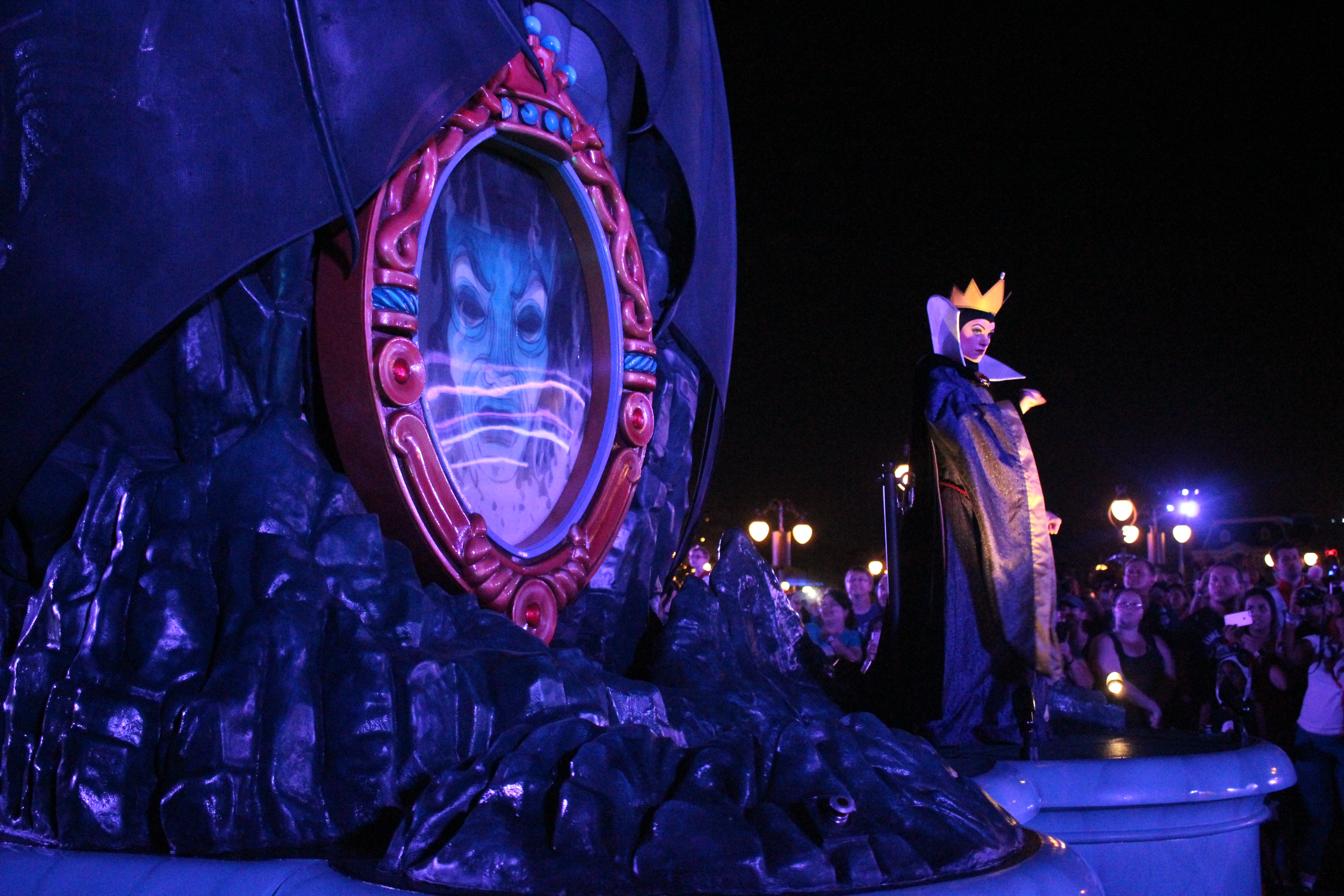
The Evil Queen with her Mirror at Mickey's Boo-to-You Halloween Parade 2016

The Magic Mirror appears in Disney's Snow White and the Seven Dwarfs, voiced by Moroni Olsen. This version contains an imprisoned spirit resembling a drama mask who is referred to as the Slave in the Magic Mirror. In his first appearance in the film, the Evil Queen consults with the Magic Mirror to ask who the fairest one of all is. The Magic Mirror tells the Evil Queen that she was the fairest one of all; however, while she is beautiful, a fairer being exists. When the Queen angrily asks for the girl's name, the spirit describes her, making it obvious to the Queen that Snow White is the one being referred to. The Queen orders her Huntsman to kill Snow White and bring back her heart. Later that evening, when the Evil Queen asks the Magic Mirror who the fairest of them all is, the Magic Mirror tells her that Snow White was still the fairest of them all. Though the Queen at first believes the spirit to be incorrect and showed it the heart in question, she is told that she holds the heart of a pig and that Snow White still lives in the cottage of the Seven Dwarfs.

The Magic Mirror appears in the Disneyland attraction Snow White's Scary Adventures, voiced by Tony Jay.

The Magic Mirror appears in the animated series House of Mouse, voiced again by Tony Jay. It is seen in the lobby of the club, answering questions from the guests and giving advice to the staff members. In the episode "House of Magic", Daisy accidentally makes the guests disappear, causing Mickey to turn to the Magic Mirror for information on how to undo the spell. When the Magic Mirror gives a cryptic answer, Mickey asks him to repeat it again in a way he can understand it. The Magic Mirror tells him to check the prop basement for anything that can help them. As Mickey leads the staff to the basement, the Magic Mirror states that nobody wants to hear his cryptic answers anymore.

The Magic Mirror appears in Fantasmic!, with Tony Jay reprising the role.

The Magic Mirror appears in Kingdom Hearts: Birth by Sleep, voiced by Corey Burton. The Magic Mirror first appears in Terra's storyline. As in the original film, it tells the Queen that Snow White is fairer than her, but also that Snow White's heart is a pure light that shines bright. The Evil Queen promises Terra that he can use the Mirror to find Master Xehanort if he brings her Snow White's heart. Terra refuses, telling her that, unlike Snow White, she has much darkness in her heart. The Evil Queen, insulted and outraged, commands the mirror to destroy Terra, but it refuses, saying it can only answer questions. The Evil Queen's increasing rage causes the Magic Mirror to have a potion slammed on its face, sucking Terra in and fighting him. However, the Spirit of the Magic Mirror is defeated and releases Terra. The Evil Queen reluctantly has the Magic Mirror tell Terra where he can find Xehanort; it tells him "Beyond both light and dark he dwells, where war was waged upon the fells." Upon learning this information, Terra leaves and is directed to the Keyblade Graveyard. The Magic Mirror later appears in Aqua's storyline. As Aqua looks for a cure for Snow White in the castle, the still-possessed Magic Mirror drags her into the mirror for a fight, but Aqua manages to defeat the Spirit of the Magic Mirror and is released. The Magic Mirror states to Aqua "The Queen is gone, my service done. Adieu, oh victorious one." before leaving the mirror and disappearing, causing it to become a normal mirror.

In the Disney Channel original movie Descendants, the Evil Queen has retained the Mirror after her exile to the Isle of the Lost, reduced to a small hand-mirror that is passed on to her daughter Evie. However, it is still controlled by rhymes spoken by the user and does not have an inhabitant in it.

A version of the Magic Mirror appears in The 7D, voiced by Whoopi Goldberg. This version is female and serves Queen Delightful of Jollyland.

The Magic Mirror appears in the live-action Snow White film, voiced by Patrick Page. In this version, the Magic Mirror is revealed to be the source of the Evil Queen's magical powers. Following the Queen's marriage to the Good King and her subsequent takeover of the kingdom, the Mirror first appears when the Queen consults it about her beauty, with the spirit initially declaring her the fairest maiden in the kingdom. Years later, when the Queen asks who is the fairest of them all, the Mirror acknowledges her beauty but reveals that Snow White has surpassed her, explaining that her kindness and inner goodness make her more beautiful. Enraged by this revelation, the Queen orders her Huntsman to kill Snow White. Later, after the Huntsman brings the Queen an apple that Snow White had previously given him, pretending that it is proof of her death, the Queen consults the Mirror again. However, the spirit reveals that Snow White is still alive somewhere deep in the forest. After the Queen poisons the apple and uses it against Snow White, she returns to the castle and asks the Mirror who is the fairest of them all. The spirit confirms that the Queen has regained her position as the fairest, much to her satisfaction. However, after Snow White awakens and ultimately defeats the Queen, the Mirror reveals that despite the Queen's outward beauty, Snow White's inner goodness makes her the fairest of them all. Furious at being denied the recognition she desperately desires, the Queen destroys the Mirror, creating a powerful vortex that transforms her into a statue of mirror shards before pulling her inside. Once the Queen disappears, the Mirror miraculously repairs itself, remaining intact as Snow White takes her rightful place as the new ruler of the kingdom.

==== Once Upon a Time ====
In Once Upon a Time, the Magic Mirror was originally a genie (Giancarlo Esposito) whose lamp was discovered by King Leopold. Leopold feels no need to wish for anything and uses the first and second wishes to free the Genie from the lamp and giving the third wish to the Genie. The Genie expresses the desire to find true love, so Leopold takes the Genie to his castle, believing that he can find true love there. He falls in love with the King's wife Queen Regina and gives her a hand mirror. The King reads in the Queen's diary that she has fallen in love with the man who gave her the hand mirror and asks the Genie to locate him. The Queen is then locked in her room to prevent her from leaving the King. To free her, her father has the Genie bring her a locked box, which turns out to be filled with poisonous vipers from Agrabah that the Queen intends to use to kill herself. The Genie instead uses the vipers to kill Leopold and allow the Queen to be with him. She tells him that, since the vipers were from his country, the guards will find out that he was the murderer and flee. Realizing that the Queen never loved him, he uses his wish to be always with her and to never leave her sight, trapping him in the hand mirror. As a spirit in the Magic Mirror, he is able to move between and see through all other mirrors in the Enchanted Forest, and is used by Regina to spy on and locate others.

In Storybrooke, he is Sidney Glass, a reporter for Storybrooke's newspaper The Daily Mirror. On Regina's request, he researches Emma Swan's past to help Regina expel her from Storybrooke. After Graham's death, Regina attempts to appoint him sheriff, but the wording of the town charter calls for an election. He loses the position to Emma and, after Regina has him removed from the newspaper staff, he goes to Emma, claiming that he wants to expose Regina for being a corrupt person. The exposé reveals Regina's attempts to improve the community; despite this, Sidney tells Emma that he will help her take down Regina, but it is revealed that he is secretly in league with Regina, who is using Emma's trust in Sidney to gain leverage over Emma. Emma later learns that he planted a bug in a vase glass after it is used to tip off Regina upon discovering a key piece of evidence that would have cleared Mary Margaret Blanchard of Kathryn Nolan's murder. Emma confronts Sidney and realizes that he is in love with Regina, but presses him to help defeat Regina. However, after Kathryn is found alive, Sidney falsely confesses to kidnapping Kathryn and framing Mary Margaret so that he could "find" Kathryn and become famous. Later, a cell labeled "S. Glass" is seen in the hospital basement's psychiatric ward; the same name is visible on a door in the first-season finale, suggesting that Regina had locked him in the Storybrooke Hospital's psychiatric ward after he confessed to the kidnapping. In "A Tale of Two Sisters", Regina frees Sidney Glass from the psychiatric ward to be her Mirror again, enlisting him to help get rid of the people that are in the middle of her happiness. Regina temporarily places Sidney in the mirror to find the exact moment in which Maid Marian was apprehended by Regina's men. Regina later consults with Sidney on how to change fate, telling him that the villains in the book do not get a happy ending and wanting him to find the writer of the book so that she can change the story and allow the villains to get their happy endings. In "Breaking Glass", Regina has Sidney Glass look for the Snow Queen's hideout to force her into thawing Maid Marian from her freezing spell. When Emma arrives wanting to know where Sidney Glass is, Regina states that she is too busy to tell her where Sidney Glass is. Sidney later reports to Regina about where the Snow Queen is hiding out after his failed attempt to get leverage on Regina. Using a compact to remain in contact with Sidney Glass, Regina heads in the direction of the Snow Queen's hideout and later admits that Sidney was in the mirror. Upon strong winds reaching Emma and Regina, Sidney reveals the Snow Queen had swayed him to her side as Elsa's ice bridge breaks. After Emma and Regina defeat a large Viking made of ice, the Snow Queen takes the compact and retreats. At her hideout, the Snow Queen frees Sidney from the mirror, as she wanted the mirror that he was trapped in, which contains dark magic, to go with the mirror that she is putting together. Before declaring Sidney free, the Snow Queen advises Sidney to get a warm coat since it is "going to get cooler around here."

=== Other appearances ===
==== The 10th Kingdom ====
In the TV miniseries The 10th Kingdom, a magic mirror is a key element of the plot, as protagonists Tony and Virginia Lewis travel from New York into the fairy-tale realm via a traveling mirror. After they subsequently lose the mirror, they spend the rest of the series searching for it while their enemy, the evil Queen and protégé of Snow White's deceased stepmother, spies on them using other magic mirrors. The travelling mirror that brought them to the world is destroyed in an accident, but an old mirror referred to as Gustav, which can only communicate and respond to queries made in rhyme, reveals that there were two other travelling mirrors made, with one sunk at the bottom of the ocean and the other in the possession of the Queen. Following the Queen's defeat, Virginia returns to New York through her travelling mirror, while Tony decides to remain in the fairy-tale realm to enjoy his new status as a hero.

==== Broom-Stick Bunny ====
In the Warner Bros. cartoon Broom-Stick Bunny (1956), Witch Hazel uses a magic mirror that assures her she is the ugliest one of all. Bugs Bunny then shows up dressed in a Halloween costume, which fools both Witch Hazel and the mirror.

==== Faerie Tale Theatre ====
The mirror in Faerie Tale Theatre was portrayed by Vincent Price, whose face appeared as if mounted on the top of the mirror; in reality, Price stuck his face through a hole. This mirror, as did all of the Queen's other mirrors, turns black after she learns that Snow White was alive.

==== Sesame Street ====
The Magic Mirror appeared in Episode 685 of Sesame Street, with the Magic Mirror's face being the face of Jerry Nelson. In the "Sesame Street News Flash" segment, Kermit the Frog interviews the Magic Mirror on which question the evil witch will ask him and tells Kermit that it is the same question where the Snow White answer "drives her up the wall." The witch asks the Magic Mirror who is the fairest in the land, has two beautiful eyes, is green, wearing a hat, wielding a microphone, and is in the same room as the Magic Mirror. The Magic Mirror states that Kermit the Frog is the fairest. The witch then notices Kermit the Frog hiding behind the curtain and states that he is good-looking.

==== Grimm's Fairy Tale Classics ====
The Magic Mirror appears in the "Snow White" episode of Grimm's Fairy Tale Classics, voiced by Doug Lee in the English dub. It is kept in a cabinet in the Evil Queen's chambers. Like in the story, the Magic Mirror tells the Evil Queen that she was the fairest of them all until the day when Snow White comes of age. In this version, when the Magic Mirror told the Evil Queen that the Seven Dwarfs freed Snow White from the deadly laces and that she cannot be killed when she is in their protection, the Evil Queen breaks the Magic Mirror while vowing to prove it wrong.

==== Snow White (1987) ====
The Magic Mirror appears in the 1987 Snow White film, portrayed by Julian Chagrin. Its head appears when the Evil Queen asks it who the fairest of them all is. After learning of the Prince's wedding to a bride more fairer than she is, the Evil Queen breaks the Magic Mirror and attends the wedding. Seeing that it is Snow White, the Evil Queen starts aging as the Magic Mirror continues to break. Once the Magic Mirror is fully broken, the Evil Queen shatters.

==== The Charmings ====
The Magic Mirror appears in the sitcom The Charmings, portrayed by Paul Winfield. It is depicted as a mirror with a man inside of it, who constantly tells Queen Lillian White that her stepdaughter will always come out on top.

==== Happily Ever After ====
The Magic Mirror, referred to as the Looking Glass, appears in Happily Ever After, voiced by Dom DeLuise. When Lord Maliss asks him where his sister the Evil Queen is and threatens it for information, the Looking Glass tells him that she has died trying to kill Snow White. After Snow White evades Maliss' dragon form, Maliss consults the Looking Glass again, who tells him that Snow White and the Dwarfelles are heading to Rainbow Falls. When Snow White ventures to Maliss' castle, the Looking Glass tells him that it will be tough for her to find his castle. When the Dwarfelles enter Maliss' castle and wonder where Maliss has taken Snow White, the Looking Glass states that "beneath the Queen lies a secret door." After searching the area, they find a panel to the hidden door underneath the Evil Queen's bust.

==== Snow White (1990) ====
The Magic Mirror appears in the 1990 Snow White film, voiced by Cam Clarke. He is depicted as an anthropomorphic hand mirror who would often try to get the Evil Queen not to ask who is the fairest one of all. At the end of the film, following the Evil Queen's defeat, the Magic Mirror attends the wedding of Snow White and the Prince.

==== Snow White and the Magic Mirror ====
The Magic Mirror appears in Snow White and the Magic Mirror, voiced by an uncredited Doug Stone. This version appears as a disembodied wisecracking head and hands who does various impersonations like Humphrey Bogart, Jack Nicholson, Elvis Presley, Fred Rogers, Jerry Seinfeld, and Rod Serling. After Snow White ate the poison apple, the Evil Queen fired the Magic Mirror and threw it into the river when it claimed that it was the fairest in the land. At the end of the film, the Magic Mirror sang at Snow White's wedding to the prince after they found it in the river.

==== Snow White: A Tale of Terror ====
In Snow White: A Tale of Terror, the mirror is owned by Lady Claudia (portrayed by Sigourney Weaver). It is a wooden closet with a statue as the door and hands acting as locks, who she regards as a family heritage artifact. Snow White's nanny tries to see what is inside while cleaning it and dies after suffering a heart attack. The mirror displays a beautiful and younger version of Claudia who advises her on what to do. The mirror also contains Claudia's life force, causing her to age rapidly when Snow White stabs the mirror and then sets the room on fire.

==== Happily Ever After: Fairy Tales for Every Child ====
In the Happily Ever After: Fairy Tales for Every Child rendition of Snow White, which has a Native American theme, the Magic Mirror (voiced by Buffy Sainte-Marie) is a shiny flat rock. It tells Sly Fox that it is the fairest in the land until White Snow came of age. When White Snow is discovered to be alive and the first disguise attempt to do away with her fails, the Magic Mirror uses its powers to enable Sly Fox to enter the spirit world so she can change her shape. Sly Fox uses the Magic Mirror's abilities to assume the form of White Snow's nanny Sage Flower and give her a poison apple. For the last time, the Magic Mirror informs Sly Fox that White Snow is alive and Sly Fox is still second to her. Sly Fox is later confronted by the Chief Brown Bear's tribe and the Seven Mystical Little Men for her treachery. She enters the Magic Mirror and turns into a bear, only for the Seven Mystical Little Men to throw the Magic Mirror off a cliff, trapping her in the spirit world.

==== Shrek ====
The Magic Mirror appears in the Shrek franchise, voiced by Chris Miller. It is depicted as a mirror with a live spirit communicating through it, and with magical displaying abilities.

- In Shrek, the Magic Mirror is first brought to Lord Farquaad, who asks it if Duloc is not the most perfect kingdom, exactly the same way the Evil Queen used to ask it if she was not the fairest of all. The Magic Mirror then presents Farquaad with three princesses that he can marry, from which he chooses Fiona in a parody of Blind Date.
- It is later seen to be with Shrek's posse who, in Shrek 2, use it as a television set, such as announcing that the show will be back after commercials.
- In Shrek Forever After, Rumpelstiltskin has it and uses it for television broadcasting.

==== Rugrats ====
The Magic Mirror appears in the Rugrats: Tales from the Crib story "Snow White", voiced by Kenan Thompson.

==== The Suite Life ====
A parody version of the Magic Mirror appears as a recurring character throughout The Suite Life of Zack & Cody, voiced by Brian Peck. It is a high tech mirror that often compliments London Tipton's attire.

A direct representation of the Magic Mirror appears in The Suite Life on Deck episode "Once Upon A Suite Life", voiced by Michael Airington. It is seen when the characters are dreaming of themselves in the classic fairytales such as Snow White, Jack and the Beanstalk, and Hansel and Gretel.

==== The Hunters ====
In the 2013 SyFy film The Hunters, it is revealed that the Magic Mirror was inspired by a fabled mirror that is said to grant the wish of whoever looks into it; supposedly, the mirror triggered the Dark Ages. The mirror was sought by an ancient army known as the Krugen before the hunters – a group of scientist knights dedicated to protecting fairy-tale artefacts – acquired the mirror, breaking off four shards from the mirror and hiding them and the mirror away when destroying it completely proved impossible. The film focuses on a family of hunters, the Flynns, with the parents being experienced hunters seeking the shards to keep them away from the Krugen and their sons being forced to take up the hunt when their parents go missing. The mirror is eventually reassembled by the film's antagonist, but he is tricked into making a wish that caused the mirror to destroy him, with the protagonists subsequently wishing for the mirror to destroy itself.

==== The Huntsman film series ====
In Snow White and the Huntsman, the Magic Mirror appears as a golden gong-like mirror that oozes out a hooded robed being (voiced by Christopher Obi) whenever Queen Ravenna called upon it for information, but is only visible to Ravenna, as her henchmen observe her talking to thin air. The Magic Mirror first appeared where he told Ravenna that Snow White was coming to the age where she will be more fair than Queen Ravenna. The Mirror is last seen when Snow White defeats Ravenna, ending the Evil Queen's rule.

In the prequel/sequel, The Huntsman: Winter's War, the Magic Mirror (voiced by Fred Tatasciore) is revealed to hold darker forms of magic. He is seen in flashbacks of Queen Ravenna's tyrannical reign, where it tells her that her sister Freya will give birth to a child who will exceed Ravenna's beauty as the fairest of them all. The Mirror also predicts that if the child was to be harmed, Freya will unleash powers, prompting Ravenna to orchestrate the murder of her niece to preserve her own beauty and, in her own twisted way, help her sister. Freya, in horror at her discovery, releases icy powers that kill her lover and turn her hair white. Years later, after Ravenna's death, the Magic Mirror has gone missing while travelling to a Sanctuary where Snow White believes its evil can be contained. It is revealed to be in the hands of a troll in a forest, but Freya, seeking the mirror for herself, orders Sara, the Huntsman's presumed-dead wife, to retrieve it. Although Sara obeys this order, she tricks Freya by sparing Eric's life. Freya's subsequent attempt to use the Mirror herself reveals that Ravenna had hidden a part of herself in the mirror, restoring her to a form of life apparently formed of the Mirror's gold while still appearing human. In the final confrontation, Freya learns the truth about her sister's role in the death of her daughter, as Ravenna was now the mirror spirit and was thus bound to answer Freya's questions truthfully, prompting her to aid Eric in destroying the Mirror at the cost of her own life. However, the final scene shows a golden raven flying away, suggesting that a part of the mirror, and thus Ravenna, may have survived.

==== Mirror Mirror ====
In the film Mirror Mirror, elements of the Magic Mirror are featured as a large mirror that serves as a portal to the Mirror House where Queen Clementianna consults with the Mirror Queen (portrayed by Lisa Roberts Gillian and voiced by Julia Roberts, whose image was used for the character). To access the portal to the Mirror House, Clementianna says "Mirror Mirror on the Wall." The Mirror Queen always advises Clementianna not to use dark magic for her own gain. Clementianna keeps asking her what is this price that she is talking about. The Mirror Queen once provided a love potion to Clementianna to make the King fall in love with her and then briefly turned Brighton into a cockroach. When Snow White destroys the necklace around the Beast which turns it back into the King, Clementianna starts to age as the Mirror Queen asks if she is ready to learn the price of magic. After the aged Clementianna takes the slice of an apple she was to give to Snow White from her, the Mirror Queen declares that it was Snow White's story all along as the Mirror House shatters alongside the large mirror leading to it.

==== Princesses ====
In Jim C. Hines' Princesses series – chronicling the adventures of Snow White with Princess Danielle Whiteshore (Cinderella) and former Princess Talia Malak-el-Dahshat (Sleeping Beauty) after their tales concluded, with Snow and Talia being banished from their kingdoms and taken in by Danielle's mother-in-law – Snow White is a sorceress who uses her mother's mirror as a key focus of her spells, relying on various smaller mirrors to maintain a link to it when away from the palace. Her power is commonly focused by using various rhymes as spells, although she can create other spells without speaking. The fourth novel, The Snow Queen's Revenge, reveals that the magic mirror was created by Snow White's mother imprisoning a demon and binding it to her service. The plot suggests that the mirror's role in the original story was motivated by the demon attempting to create a set of circumstances that would allow it to escape. This inspired Snow's mother to attack her daughter so that Snow would inherit the mirror and eventually make a mistake that would free the demon. In the novel The Snow Queen's Revenge, the mirror shatters after Snow tries to perform a complex spell, allowing the demon within it to possess her while shards of the mirror corrupt others. This forces Danielle and Talia to return to Snow's kingdom in hopes of rediscovering the secrets used by Snow White's mother to bind the demon so that they can try and exorcise it from Snow. After this plan proves impossible due to the demon's interference, the demon attempts to recreate a larger ice-mirror to summon further demons into this world using the part-fairy blood of Danielle's son Jakub – Danielle having some fairy blood in her from her mother's side of the family. However, a reflection of Snow's untainted self helps protect her friends long enough for them to destroy the demon, at the cost of her life.

==== Simon the Sorcerer ====
Near the end of the video game Simon the Sorcerer, the player can use the Magic Mirror in Sordid's tower as a surveillance monitor, using any reflecting surface like a camera.

==== Sinister Squad ====
Although the magic mirror does not appear directly in the Asylum film Sinister Squad, it is referenced as a key part of the film's backstory; when Rumpelstiltskin destroyed the mirror to prevent the forces of Death claiming it, it transferred several fairy-tale characters into our world, with Rumpelstiltskin relying on fragments of the mirror to sustain his own magical manipulation abilities until the final confrontation with Death.

==== Sisters Grimm ====
In the Sisters Grimm series by Michael Buckley, the Magic Mirror appears as a minor protagonist in the first six books, but is revealed to be the main antagonist in book seven and remains evil until near the end of book nine.

==== Snow White: The Fairest of Them All ====
The wicked queen Elspeth possesses a hall of magic mirrors and a hand mirror. The Queen may command the hand mirror to terminate enemies as she did to the Huntsman, use it as a means of transport or step through it to change appearances, even turning others into animals.

==== The Wolf Among Us ====
Appearing as a magical object in the Business Office, the Magic Mirror is a minor protagonist in The Wolf Among Us, voiced by Gavin Hammon. Usually demanding its request be given to it in rhyme form, the Magic Mirror is capable of showing a brief vision of its requested subject. The Magic Mirror's shattering and the search for its missing shard become key aspects following the end of the second episode.

==== Ever After High ====
In the Ever After High series of books, webisodes, and made-for-TV movies, the magic mirror is an important part of the series' story. In the series, the Evil Queen is banished to live within the mirror as punishment for her Curses against the lands of Ever After and Wonderland.

==== Red Shoes and the Seven Dwarfs ====
The Magic Mirror appears in the Snow White parody Red Shoes and the Seven Dwarfs, voiced by Patrick Warburton.

==== Steven Universe ====
Appearing as a magical object infused with a gem in Steven Universe, it is initially thought to be a device that answers questions, but later on the show, it turns out to be a sentient alien gem called Lapis Lazuli.

== Magic Mirror-inspired tourism ==
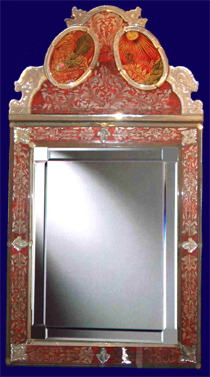
The "Talking Mirror" at the Spessart Museum in Lohr am Main

German pharmacist and fairy-tale parodist Karlheinz Bartels suggests, in a tongue-in-cheek manner, that the German folk tale "Snow White" is influenced by Maria Sophia Margaretha Catherina von und zu Erthal, who was born in Lohr am Main in 1725. After the death of Maria Sophia's birth mother in 1738, her father Philipp Christoph von und zu Erthal took a second wife.

Lohr Castle, which was once owned by Philipp Christoph, featured a large mirror which has been connected to the Evil Queen's iconic mirror and which can still be viewed there today. It was a product of the Lohr Mirror Manufacture (Kurmainzische Spiegelmanufaktur) and may have been in the castle as early as 1719, when Philipp Christoph took office. The mirror "talked" via inscribed aphorisms. The upper right corner is labeled "Amour Propre" or "self-love", and the left corner reads "Pour la recompense et pour la peine" ("for reward and for punishment"). Mirrors from Lohr were so elaborately worked that they were accorded the reputation of "always speaking the truth". They became a favorite gift at European crown and aristocratic courts.

Bartels's theory, which is "admittedly a joke of its inventor", is not taken seriously by scholarly experts.

== Magic Mirror-inspired technology ==
In 2017, Amazon announced Echo Look, a "style assistant" camera that helps catalog the user's outfits and rates their look based on "machine learning algorithms with advice from fashion specialists".
