= Henry IX of Waldeck =

Henry IX, Count of Waldeck
- Born: 10 December 1531
- Died: 3 October 1577 (aged 45); Werbe, now part of Waldeck
- Noble family: House of Waldeck
- Spouse: Anna of Viermund
- Father: Philip IV, Count of Waldeck
- Mother: Margaret of East Frisia

Henry IX of Waldeck-Wildungen (10 December 1531 – 3 October 1577 in Werbe) was the fourth son of the Count Philip IV (1493–1574) and his first wife, Margaret of East Frisia (1500–1537). In 1577, he was the ruling Count of Waldeck-Wildungen for four months.

== Life ==
On 7 June 1577, he succeeded his childless brother Daniel (1530–1577) as Count of Waldeck-Wildungen. He was the seventh ruling Count named Henry. However, two earlier non-ruling members of the House of Waldeck are usually called Henry II and Henry III, and the subject of this article is commonly known as Henry IX. Nevertheless, some sources call him Henry VII.

From 1562 to 1563, he fought on the Protestant side in the First Huguenot War in France. After his return, he married on 19 December 1563 in Korbach to Anna of Viermund-Nordenbeck (1538–1599), who brought the Lordship of Nordenbeck into the marriage. The marriage remained childless

Anna's step-cousins did not recognize her as the heir to Nordenbeck. They invaded the lordship and occupied Nordenbeck Castle. Due to lack of funds, Henry IX could not respond immediately. When he was ready to march his troops into Nordenbeck, his horse bolted and stampeded and he died in front of his wife, hanging from the stirrups. Anna sued her step-cousins in the Reichskammergericht, which ruled in her favour in 1580.

Henry was succeeded as Count of Waldeck-Wildungen by his nephew Günther (29 June 1557 – 23 May 1585), the son of his brother Samuel, who had died in 1570.
