= The Truth About Hansel and Gretel =

Book written by German caricaturist Hans Traxler in 1963

The Truth About Hansel and Gretel (German: Die Wahrheit über Hänsel und Gretel) is a 1963 book written by German children's author and humorist Hans Traxler, which described how an amateur archaeologist named Georg Ossegg uncovered evidence that the story about Hansel and Gretel was based on real events, just as Heinrich Schliemann discovered the city of Troy from Ancient Greek legends. The book immediately became a bestseller, but within several months Traxler confessed it was a hoax.

== Summary ==
According to the book, an amateur archaeologist named Georg Ossegg determined that the fairytale, Hansel and Gretel, was based on the story of a 17th-century baker named Hans Metzler and his sister Grete. Hans and Grete Metzler lived in a village in the Spessart Forest during the Thirty Years' War, and killed a woman named Katharina Schraderin in order to steal her recipe for Nürnberger Lebkuchen (gingerbread).

In reality, Ossegg did not exist and Traxler fabricated the details of the story. Die Frankfurter Allgemeine Zeitung called it a mockumentary from a modern perspective. Vanessa Joosen has called the book a "fictive nonfictional text", which "carries the features of a nonfictional text but consciously misleads the reader".

== In popular culture ==
Despite its fictional nature, the hoax convinced many in Germany at the time, and continues to have some traction. In 1987, a one-hour twenty-two minute movie, Ossegg oder Die Wahrheit über Hänsel und Gretel, loosely based on the novel, was released in Germany.

In Italy, Traxler's book was published in 1981, and as late as 1989 Giuseppe Sermonti believed the story to be true.

In the 1980s, in another area neighboring the Spessart Forest, German pharmacist Karlheinz Bartels published a joking theory that Snow White was based on a real person named Maria Sophia Margarethe Catharina, Baroness von und zu Erthal. The theory was primarily inspired by Traxler's book.

In 2010 the museum in Ulm had an exhibition "Studio Archäologie: Die Wahrheit über Hänsel und Gretel. Hans Traxler und die Anfänge der Märchenarchäologie." In 2012 an exhibition named "Wie aus Lüge Wahrheit wird" -How lies become truth was shown in Lahr. In October 2021, Tim Harford released the episode "The Truth About Hansel and Gretel" of his podcast Cautionary Tales about Traxler's satire.
