= Daniel, Count of Waldeck =

- Born: 1 August 1530
- Died: 7 June 1577 (aged 46); Waldeck
- Buried: Marienthal Abbey in Netze (now part of Waldeck)
- Noble family: House of Waldeck
- Spouse: Barbara of Hesse (m. 1568)
- Father: Philip IV, Count of Waldeck
- Mother: Margaret of East Frisia

Daniel of Waldeck (1 August 1530 – 7 June 1577 in Waldeck) was a ruling count of Waldeck-Wildungen. He was the third, but eldest surviving son of the Count Philip IV (1493–1574) and his first wife, Margaret of East Frisia (1500–1537).

Although his parents were Calvinists, Daniel became a Catholic and in 1550, he became canon in Strasbourg. However, he resigned from this position soon afterwards and joined the French army.

On 4 April 1567 he was a pallbearer at the funeral of Landgrave Philip I of Hesse. Probably at this funeral, he met Philip's daughter Barbara (1536–1597), the widow of Count George I of Württemberg-Mömpelgard (1498–1558). He married her on 11 November 1568. Their combined coat of arms can still be found in the stair tower of Waldeck Castle. The marriage remained childless.

After his father's death, in 1574, he inherited Waldeck Castle and the half the district of Waldeck, as well as the City and District of and Naumburg.

Daniel died on 7 June 1577 and was buried in the family crypt in Marienthal Abbey in Netze (now part of Waldeck). He was succeeded by his younger brother Henry IX, who died later that year, on 3 October.
