= Petrus von Hatzfeld =

German Roman Catholic priest and abbot

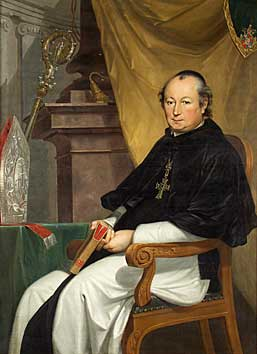
Petrus von Hatzfeld by Johann Christoph Rincklake

Petrus von Hatzfeld (1748 in Münster - 24 April 1823 in Rheda) was a German Roman Catholic priest, and the forty-eighth and last abbot of Marienfeld Abbey.
