= Hardehausen Abbey =

Former Cistercian monastery in Germany

Coordinates: 51°32′59″N 8°59′56″E

Hardehausen Abbey (Kloster Hardehausen) is a former Cistercian monastery located near Warburg in the district of Höxter in the east of North Rhine-Westphalia, Germany.

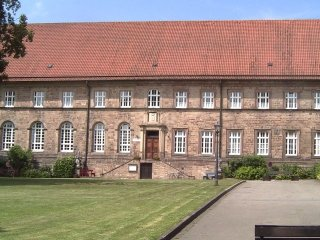
Hardehausen Abbey

== History ==
In 1009 Herswithehusen became the property of Meinwerk, bishop of Paderborn. The abbey was founded on 28 May 1140 (884 years ago), by bishop Bernhard I of Paderborn as a daughter house of Kamp Abbey on the Lower Rhine. Construction was completed with the dedication of the church in 1165 (860 years ago).

Between 1185 and 1243 three daughter houses were founded from Hardehausen: in 1185, Marienfeld Abbey in Münsterland; in 1196, Bredelar Abbey near Marsberg; and in 1243, Scharnebeck Abbey in Marienfliess near Lüneburg. Also, the nunnery at Wilhelmshausen (Walshausen) which Hardehausen had acquired in 1293 and subsequently emptied, was re-established in 1320 with a new community of monks.

During the Thirty Years' War the abbey was looted and destroyed. During its reconstruction in the years 1680 to 1750 (275 years ago) it received its present form.

In 1803 the abbey was secularised, and the monks expelled. The contents were sold or auctioned, and the church was demolished in 1812. The estates were rented out as state property.

Hardehausen was briefly re-founded as a Cistercian monastery in 1927, but the new community was brought to an end by an order of dissolution issued by the National Socialist government in 1938, when the buildings and grounds were sold to the Henschel company from Kassel, from whom they were acquired by the Verein für katholische Arbeiterkolonien ("Union for Catholic Workers' Colonies"). In 1944 the Nationalpolitische Erziehungsanstalt (Napola) Bensberg transferred to Hardehausen. At this period an external work party from Buchenwald concentration camp, consisting of 30 prisoners, were deployed for forced labour in Hardehausen.

Since 1945 the former monastery has been used for the educational activities of the present Archdiocese of Paderborn. Here are located the Jugendhaus Hardehausen (established 1945) and also the Landvolkshochschule Anton Heinen (established 1949, to provide adult education for the entire rural district). In 1970 all the buildings on the site were altered and extended for their educational functions.

== Sources and external links ==
- Landvolkshochschule Anton Heinen Hardehausen (in German)
- Jugendhaus Hardehausen (in German)
- Landschaftsverband Westfalen-Lippe: Klosteranlage Hardehausen (in German)
