= Henricus Münstermann =

Henricus Münstermann (c.1470 - 23 April 1537) was a German Catholic priest. He was Abbot of Marienfeld from 1498 until his death in 1537.

== Life ==
Münstermann was born in Münster to Johann Münstermann and his wife Gertrud. His brother Dietrich later became the mayor of Münster.

When Münstermann first joined the Cistercian monastery in Marienfeld, he administered student fellowships. He was elected abbot in late 1498 and received his consecration from the Münsteran auxiliary bishop Heinrich Schodehoet. Henricus was abbot for 39 years, making him the longest serving abbot of Marienfeld.
