= Sesame Street News Flash =

The "NEWS FLASH" title card.

Kermit reporting as the area runs amok with the Seven Dwarves.

The Sesame Street News Flash is a recurring segment on the children's television show Sesame Street. First aired in 1972, the series starred Kermit the Frog as a trench coat-dressed roving reporter who interviews Muppet versions of characters from fairy tales, Mother Goose nursery rhymes, and fables.

Given the basic format of the segments, the "Sesame Street News Flash" series served several purposes, namely to act out simple stories and nursery rhymes with which the show's audience might be familiar, and to give children a basic understanding of history. Other skits were spoofs of popular culture (such as one which parodied the then-popular The Six Million Dollar Man), while others involved Kermit asking children simple vox populi, or "man on the street," style questions. With exception to the latter, the segments were often parodies and diverged from the traditional tellings.

== Basic outline of a sketch ==
The "Sesame Street News Flash" segments were introduced with a bumper slide, featuring a black background with a cloud outline, stars and lightning; the words "NEWS FLASH" were inserted in the cloud outline and flashed as a special bulletin-type jingle — an urgent-sounding version of the Sesame Street theme (composed by Joe Raposo), with Morse code beeps — played. An announcer (voiced by Jerry Nelson) then stated, "We take you now to Kermit the Frog with another fast-breaking news story!"

The scene then broke to Kermit (performed by Jim Henson), who was stationed nearby where his report was taking place; often, he would engage in banter with his crew before realizing he was on-camera, to add to the realism and spontaneity of his report. After introducing himself ("Hi-ho, this is Kermit the Frog of Sesame Street News...") before reporting where he is.

The reports began smoothly enough before something invariably went wrong, in most cases the work of the accident-prone Kermit. For instance:

- A spoof on Humpty Dumpty began in medias res with "all the king's horses" and "all the kings men" finding the shattered Dumpty. Kermit follows the men's successful efforts to reconstruct Dumpty, then interviews the resurrected egg, finally after his statement "it's so nice to have you back", slaps Dumpty's back, knocking him off the wall and shattering him again! The lead king's horse, naturally, blames Kermit.
- In a retelling of "Rapunzel", the main character reveals that she is bald as she literally "lets down her hair." Other nursery rhyme and fairy tale retellings went similarly, such as Cinderella's fairy godmother accidentally poofing a fancy gown onto Kermit, or a whole band showing up at Old King Cole's castle instead of just his "fiddlers three." One segment combined "This Little Piggy" and "The Three Little Pigs", where after five pigs say their signature lines, the Big Bad Wolf — agitated at Kermit's constant asking him questions — makes good on a threat to "blow the frog down."
- In re-telling the legend of George Washington chopping down the cherry tree, Kermit interviews a young George just as he is about to chop down trees in a large cherry orchard. Kermit subtracts one from a running total (starting with 1776) until one of the trees falls on top of him.
- In The Six Million Dollar Man parody, Kermit interviews Professor Nucleus Von Fission, who has invented a robot entitled "The Six-Dollar Man" (a makeshift robot made of everyday items, the cost of which adds up to $6.00). The robot comes to life and immediately goes crazy, destroying Von Fission's laboratory. ("Well, what do you expect for six dollars?")
- One segment, a spoof of human interest news items, turned out to be an elaborate prank on Kermit; he was covering a story about someone standing out in the snow for a long time, based on a call from some person. He remained out in the snow attempting to find that person but to no avail, until finally, Harvey Kneeslapper showed up and revealed he was the one who called Sesame Street News about the person standing in the snow for a long time...and that person he'd been referring to was Kermit himself!!

Other segments were more serious. For example, one skit featured Kermit interviewing monsters at a daycare center about what they wanted to be when they grew up, while another featured Telly Monster and his sister being asked what they do on a rainy day. Another skit explored parential separation and divorce, featuring a young bird whose parents live in different trees; the song "They Live in Different Places, But They Both Love Me" was used to reinforce the moral.

Each report concluded with Kermit saying, "This is Kermit the Frog returning you to your regularly scheduled program."

== Longevity ==
Sesame Street News Flash featuring Kermit the Frog was a recurring segment from the 1970s through the 1990s. After Jim Henson's death, the skits were unofficially canceled, but older Sesame Street News segments were still rerun on the show. On a few occasions, a new Sesame Street News segment would be made relating to the episode, with Steve Whitmire performing Kermit.
