= Edzard I of East Frisia =

Count of East Frisia (1462–1528)

Edzard I
- Count of East Frisia; Lord of Groningen
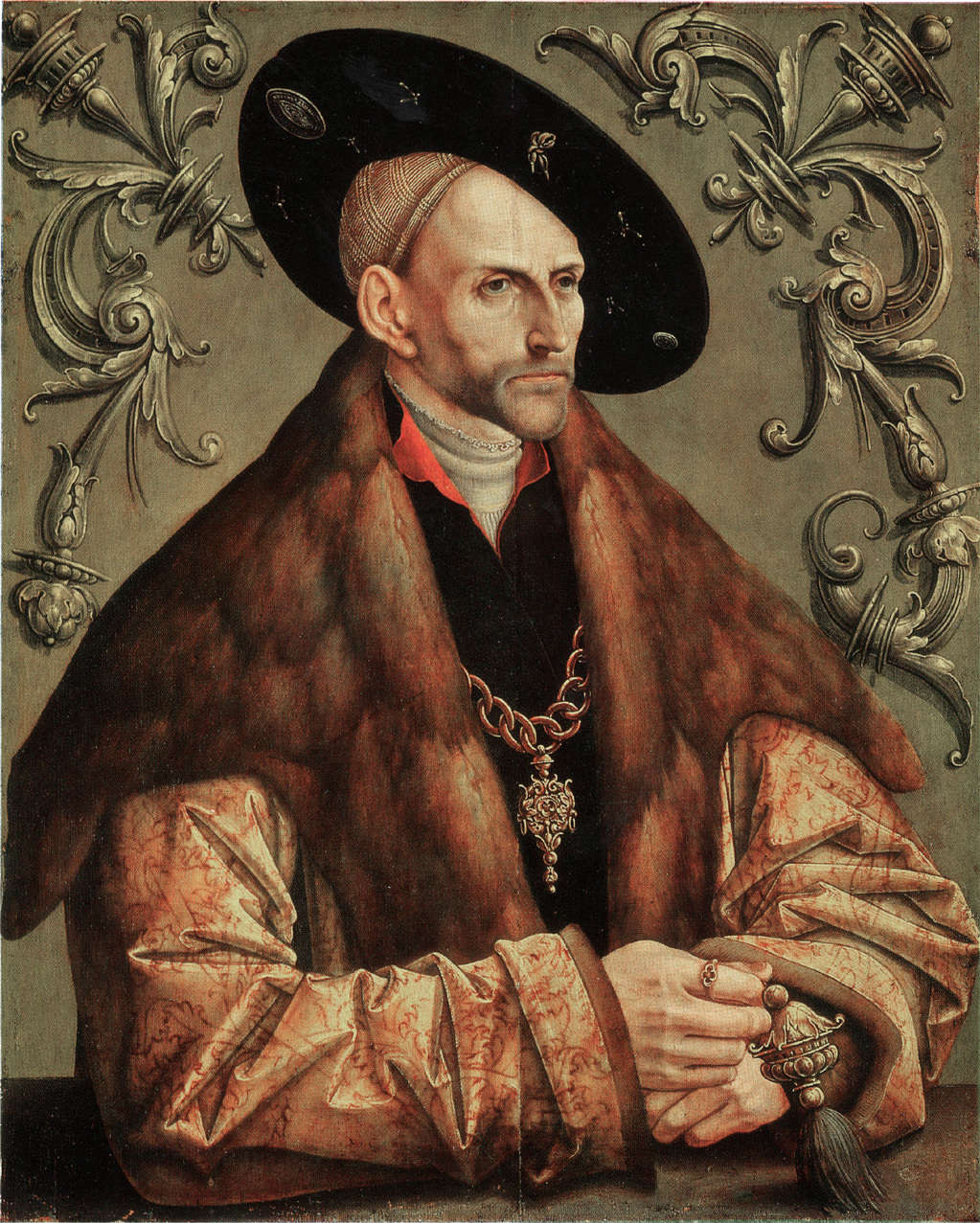
- Edzard I, Count of East Frisia

Count of East Frisia
- Reign: 19 February 1491 – 14 February 1528
- Predecessor: Enno I
- Successor: Enno II

Lord of Groningen
- Reign: 1 May 1506 – 2 November 1514
- Successor: Charles II
- Born: 15 January 1462; Greetsiel
- Died: 14 February 1528 (aged 66); Emden
- Burial: Kloster Marienthal
- Spouse: Elisabeth of Rietberg (m. 1497)
- Issue Detail: Ulrich of East Frisia; Margaret of East Frisia; Theda of East Frisia; Enno II of East Frisia; Johan I of East Frisia; Anna of East Frisia; Armgard of East Frisia
- House: Cirksena
- Father: Ulrich I
- Mother: Theda Ukena
- Religion: Lutheran; prev. Catholicism
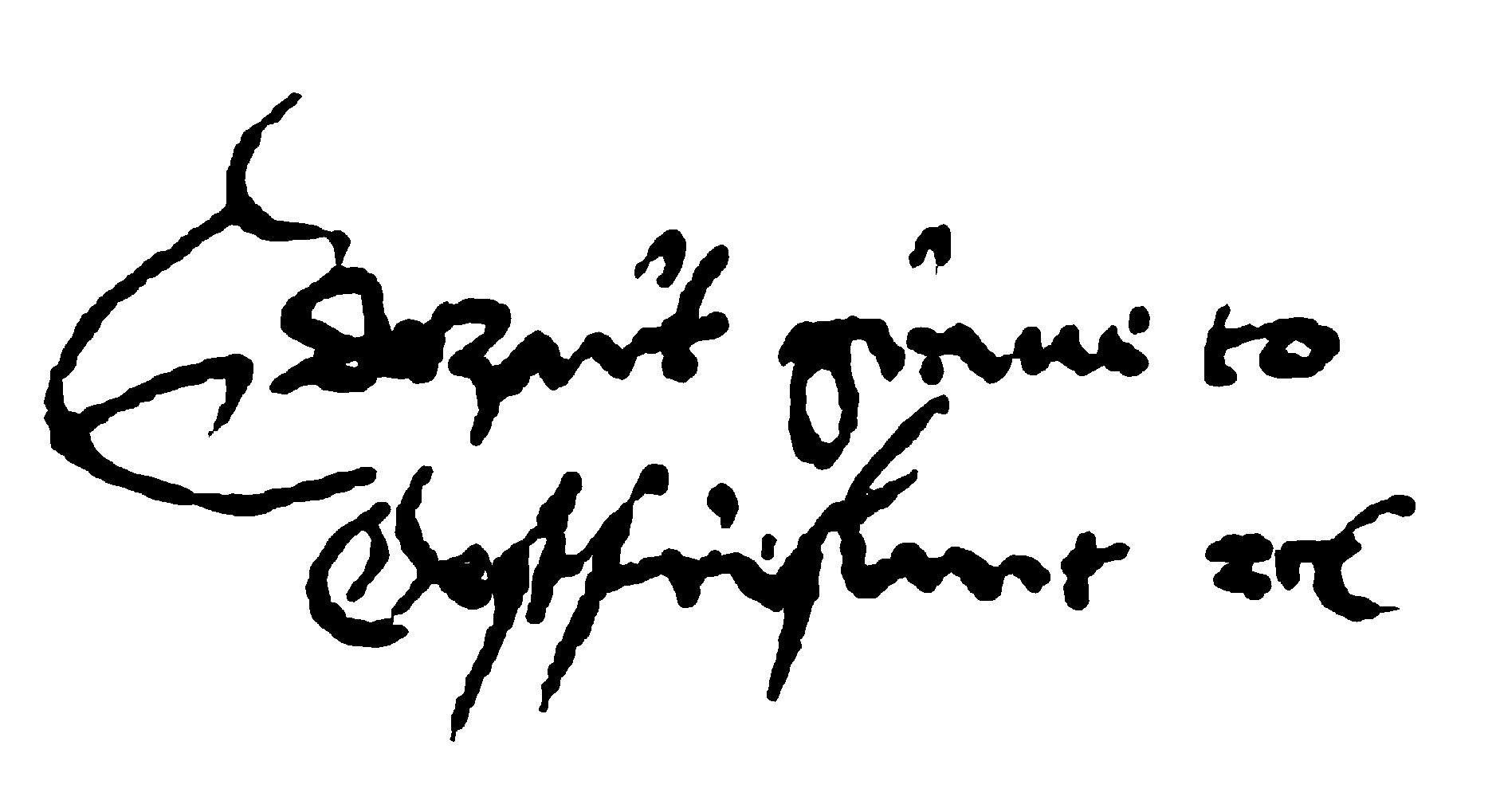
- Signature

Edzard I, also Edzard the Great (15 January 1462 in Greetsiel – 14 February 1528 in Emden) was count of East Frisia from 1491 until his death in 1528.

== Life ==
Edzard succeeded his brother Enno in 1492. He fought with George, Duke of Saxony over Friesland and Groningen. The city of Groningen accepted him as its lord in 1506, but in 1514 renounced him again in favor of Charles of Guelders.

After he returned from a pilgrimage to Jerusalem in 1492, he took over the rule of East Frisia together with his mother, Theda. After his mother died in 1494, he ruled with his less significant brother Uko.

Edzard's energetic approach against his opponents, the East Frisian leaders Hero Oomkens of Esens, Stedesdorf and Wittmund and Edo Wiemken of Jever, whom he quickly managed to subdue, characterized his rule. He was also a supporter of the Protestant Reformation in his territories through the creation of new East Frisian laws, the reform of the coinage, and the introduction of primogeniture for his house, the house of Cirksena.

His foreign policies led to a three-year war (1514–1517) against Duke George of Saxony. The war was mostly fought on East Frisian territory and destroyed large areas. For example, the city of Aurich was burned to the ground.

Duke George of Saxony was appointed stadtholder of all Frisian territories in 1514 by Maximilian I, Holy Roman Emperor. This was not accepted by the city of Groningen. Count Edzard saw this as a chance to expand his influence in the province of Groningen, and proclaimed himself protector of the city. As a result, 24 German dukes and counts invaded the Frisian lands with their troops and devastated the region. Edzard was proclaimed an outlaw (Reichsacht) by the emperor.

During the three-year war, Edzard eventually managed to keep the majority of East Frisia under his control. Only when Charles V came to power in the Netherlands did Edzard manage to end the war by getting himself confirmed as ruler of East Frisia.

== Marriage and children ==
He married in 1497 with Countess Elisabeth of Rietberg (c.1483–1512), daughter of John I of Rietberg and had seven children:

- Ulrich of East Frisia (1499-1532)
- Margaret of East Frisia (1500–1537), married with Philipp IV of Waldeck Margaret became the mother of Margaretha von Waldeck. Margaretha von Waldeck was believed to be the inspiration of Snow White.
- Theda of East Frisia (1502-1563)
- Enno II of East Frisia (1505–1540), his successor
- Johan I of East Frisia (1506–1572)
- Anna of East Frisia (?-1530)
- Armgard of East Frisia (?-1559)

== Ancestors ==
Ancestors of Edzard I of East Frisia

16. Enno II Edzardisna
8. Edzard II Ennosna
17. Adda Beninga
4. Enno III Edzardisna
18. Keno I tom Brok
9. Doda tom Brok
19. Ocka of Nesse
2. Ulrich I of East Frisia
20. Folkard Beninga
10. Affo Beninga
21. Frouwa of Manslagt
5. Gela Beninga
22. Merten Sydzena
11. Tiadeke Mertens Sydzena
1. Edzard I, Count of East Frisia
24. Uko Benen
12. Focko Ukena
25. Amke of Lengen
6. Uko Fockena
26. Ewo Tammena
13. Theda of Rheide
27. Bouwa Onsta
3. Theda Ukena
28. Hero Attena
14. Lütet Attena
29. Etta Ennosna
7. Heba Attena
30. Ocko I tom Brok
15. Ocka tom Brok
31. Foelke Kampana

== See also ==
- Frisians
- House of Cirksena
- County of East Frisia
- List of counts of East Frisia

Edzard I of East Frisia Cirksena Born: 1461 Died: 14 February 1528
Preceded by Enno I	Count of East Frisia; 1491–1528	Succeeded by Enno II
