= Margaretha von Waldeck =

German countess (1533–1554)

Countess Margaretha of Waldeck
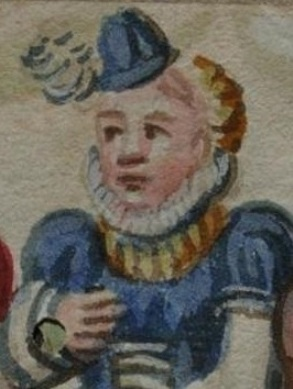
- Born: c. 1533; Holy Roman Empire
- Died: 15 March 1554 (aged 20–21); Brussels, Habsburg Netherlands
- Noble family: House of Waldeck
- Father: Philip IV, Count of Waldeck
- Mother: Margaret of East Frisia

Margaretha von Waldeck (1533 – 15 March 1554) was a German noblewoman. She was the daughter of Philip IV, Count of Waldeck-Wildungen (1493–1574) and his first wife, Margaret of East Frisia of the House of Cirksena (1500–1537), daughter of Edzard I, Count of East Frisia. One author theorized in the 1990s that her life influenced the fairy tale of Snow White. It is said she is buried in Brussels where the Place de la Bourse/Beursplein is now located.

== Life ==
According to Bad Wildungen city documents she was famous for her beauty. Since 1539 she had a very strict stepmother, Katharina von Hatzfeldt (1487–1546) and perhaps soon after Margaretha was raised at Weilburg at the court of Philip III, Count of Nassau-Weilburg.

In 1545 she traveled through the Siebengebirge ("seven hills") to live with her mother's brother Johann Cirksena (1506–1572) at Valkenburg Castle, in present-day Limburg, Netherlands. In 1549, her father sent her on to the Brussels court of Mary of Hungary, governor of the Habsburg Netherlands and sister of Charles V, Holy Roman Emperor. Margaretha's presence at the court was partially meant to improve the relationship of her father with the emperor and help the release of Philip I, Landgrave of Hesse, who had been imprisoned in Brussels for his role in the Schmalkaldic War.

The situation at the court was complicated as several high ranking personalities were striving for Margaretha, including Lamoral, Count of Egmont. Charles V's son, Crown Prince Philip, arrived at his aunt's court in 1549. Tradition has it that he pursued Margaretha during the few months he was there, though there never could be any official relationship, as she was Lutheran. Three surviving letters from Margaretha to her father show that her health declined steadily over the next few years and she died at the age of 21 in March 1554. In Waldeck chronicles, it was suggested that she had been poisoned. She is likely buried in Brussels where the Place de la Bourse/Beursplein is now located.

== Snow White inspiration ==
Eckhard Sander, in his book Schneewittchen: Märchen oder Wahrheit? (Snow White: Is It a Fairy Tale?), alleged that Margaretha's life was inspiration for the tale of Snow White. Since, however, her father's second wife died in 1546 and he only remarried again in October 1554, her stepmother was not a suspect in the alleged poisoning case. Margaretha's father owned several copper mines; a majority of workers were children. According to Sander, the seven dwarfs were inspired by child labor in the copper mining village Bergfreiheit, now a district of Bad Wildungen that calls itself Schneewittchendorf (Snow White village). Like the fairy tale's dwarfs, the child laborers there used to live in groups of about 20 in a single room house. Sander's theory also worked in the history of Margarethe's brother's children, as well as folktales from the surrounding area - he suggested that the wicked mother figure was taken from the life of Margarethe's niece, and the magnificent wedding from the life of her nephew. Professional folklorists and scholars generally view Sander's theory as unlikely and unconvincing.
