= Philipp IV of Waldeck =

Count of Waldeck-Wildungen

Philip IV, Count of Waldeck
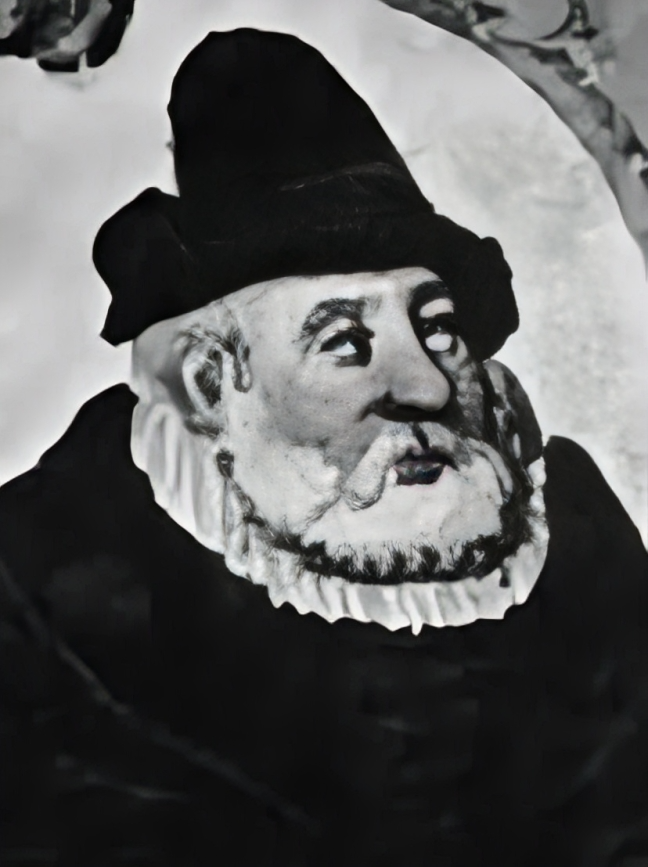
- Tenure: 28 May 1513 - 30 November 1574 (Co-ruler Samuel: 8 October 1554 - 6 January 1570)
- Predecessor: Henry VIII
- Successor: Daniel
- Born: 1493; Friedrichstein Castle, Alt-Wildungen, Amt Wildungen, County of Waldeck, Holy Roman Empire
- Died: 30 November 1574; Waldeck Castle in Waldeck, County of Waldeck, Holy Roman Empire
- Noble family: House of Waldeck
- Spouses: Margaret of East Frisia; Catherine of Hatzfeld; Jutta of Isenburg-Grenzau
- Father: Henry VIII, Count of Waldeck
- Mother: Anastasia of Runkel

Count Philip IV of Waldeck (1493 – 30 November 1574) was Count of Waldeck-Wildungen from 1513 to 1574. In 1526, he and his uncle Philip III of Waldeck-Eisenberg led the Lutheran Reformation in the county of Waldeck.

== Background ==
Philip was the son of Count Henry VIII of Waldeck and his wife Anastasia of Runkel. He was born at Friedrichstein Castle in Alt-Wildungen (now part of Bad Wildungen). In 1513, he succeeded his father as ruler of the southern part of the County of Waldeck. He ruled for 61 years, the longest of all the counts and princes of Waldeck. Until 1512, he was known as Philip the Younger; from 1512 until November 1524 as Philip the Middle and thereafter as Philip the Elder.

== Reformation ==
Philip spent his youth in Vianden (in Luxembourg), where his father was governor and later he spent some time at the French royal court. He met his first wife, Margaret of East Frisia at the Diet of Worms in 1521. There, he also met Martin Luther and became a follower of Luther's teachings. As early as 1525, the vast majority of the population of Waldeck and northern Hesse had converted to Lutheranism and in Waldeck an order from Count Philip and his uncle, Philip III specifically prescribed Protestant sermons. Philip invited Johann Hefentreger, who had been expelled from Fritzlar in the Electorate of Mainz, for a trial sermon in Bad Wildungen, which Johann held on 29 April 1526. The trial was a success and Philip and his uncle appointed Johann as town pastor in Bad Wildungen. Johann held his inaugural sermon on 17 June 1526. On 26 June 1526, Johann held a Lutheran service in the City Church of Waldeck and thereby officially introduced Lutheranism in the County of Waldeck, four months before Landgrave Philip I, Landgrave of Hesse introduced the Reformation in neighbouring Hesse at the Synod of Homberg. Later that year, Philip and his cousin Wolrad II of Waldeck-Eisenberg. following the advice of the reformer Adam Krafft, founded the Lutheran State Church of Waldeck at the monastery in Volkhardinghausen.

Johann Hefentreger was appointed visitor and later implemented the order of the two counts to dissolve the monasteries, following the Hessian example. Monasteries were dissolved at Berich, Flechtdorf, Netze, Ober-Werbe, Schaaken and Volkhardinghausen, but with the proviso that they would remain open until the death of the last spiritual resident. The income of the secularized monasteries was used to found charitable foundations and in 1578 as the basis for the county's first gymnasium, the Old County School at Korbach.

== Death ==
Philip died at the age of 80 at Waldeck Castle, the ancestral home of the family. He was buried on 4 December 1574 in the family burial vault in the Nicholas chapel of the church of Marienthal monastery in Netze (now part of the city of Waldeck. Philip was succeeded as Count of Waldeck-Wildungen by his son Daniel.

== Marriage and issue ==
Philip was married three times.

- On the 17 February 1523 in Emden, he married Margaret of East Frisia (born: 1500; died: 15 July 1537), a daughter of Count Edzard I of East Frisia and Countess Elizabeth of Rietberg. They had the following children:
  - Ernst (born: 1523 or 1524; died: 1527)
  - Elizabeth (born: 10 December 1525; died: 30 March 1543 at Waldeck Castle), married in 1542 with Count Reinhard of Isenburg (died: 28 February 1568)
  - Samuel (born: 2 May 1528 at Waldeck Castle; died: 6 January 1570 at Friedrichstein Castle in Bad Wildungen), married on 8 October 1554 with Anna Maria (1538–1583), daughter of Count Henry XXXII of Schwarzburg-Blankenburg.
  - Daniel, Count of Waldeck-Wildungen (born: 1 August 1530; died: 7 June 1577 in Waldeck); he succeeded Philip as the ruling Count of Waldeck-Wildungen and married on 11 November 1568 with Barbara of Hesse (1536–1597), daughter of Landgrave Philip I of Hesse and widow of Duke George I of Württemberg-Montbéliard
  - Henry IX, Count of Waldeck-Wildungen (born: 10 December 1531; died: 3 October 1577 in Werbe (now part of Waldeck)), married on 19 December 1563 with Anna of Viermund (died: 17 April 1599)
  - Margaret (born: 1533; died: 1554 in Brussels)
  - Frederick (born: 1534; died: 1557 in St. Quentin)
  - Anastasia (born: 1536; died: 1561 in Heidelberg)
  - Esther (born: 1537 in Bad Wildungen; died: probably in 1537)
- His second marriage, in 1539 to Catherine of Hatzfeld (died: 1546 in Naumburg), remained childless.
- On 6 October 1554, he married his third wife Jutta of Isenburg-Grenzau (died: 28 July 1564 at Waldeck Castle). With her he had the following children:
  - Elizabeth (born: 1555; died: 6 December 1569 at Waldeck Castle)
  - Magdalene (born: 1558; died: 9 September 1599), married on 5 February 1576 with Count Philip Louis I of Hanau-Münzenberg (1553–1580) and on 9 December 1581 with Count John VII of Nassau-Siegen (1561–1623)
