= Bernard VII of Lippe =

Lord of Lippe

Bernard VII
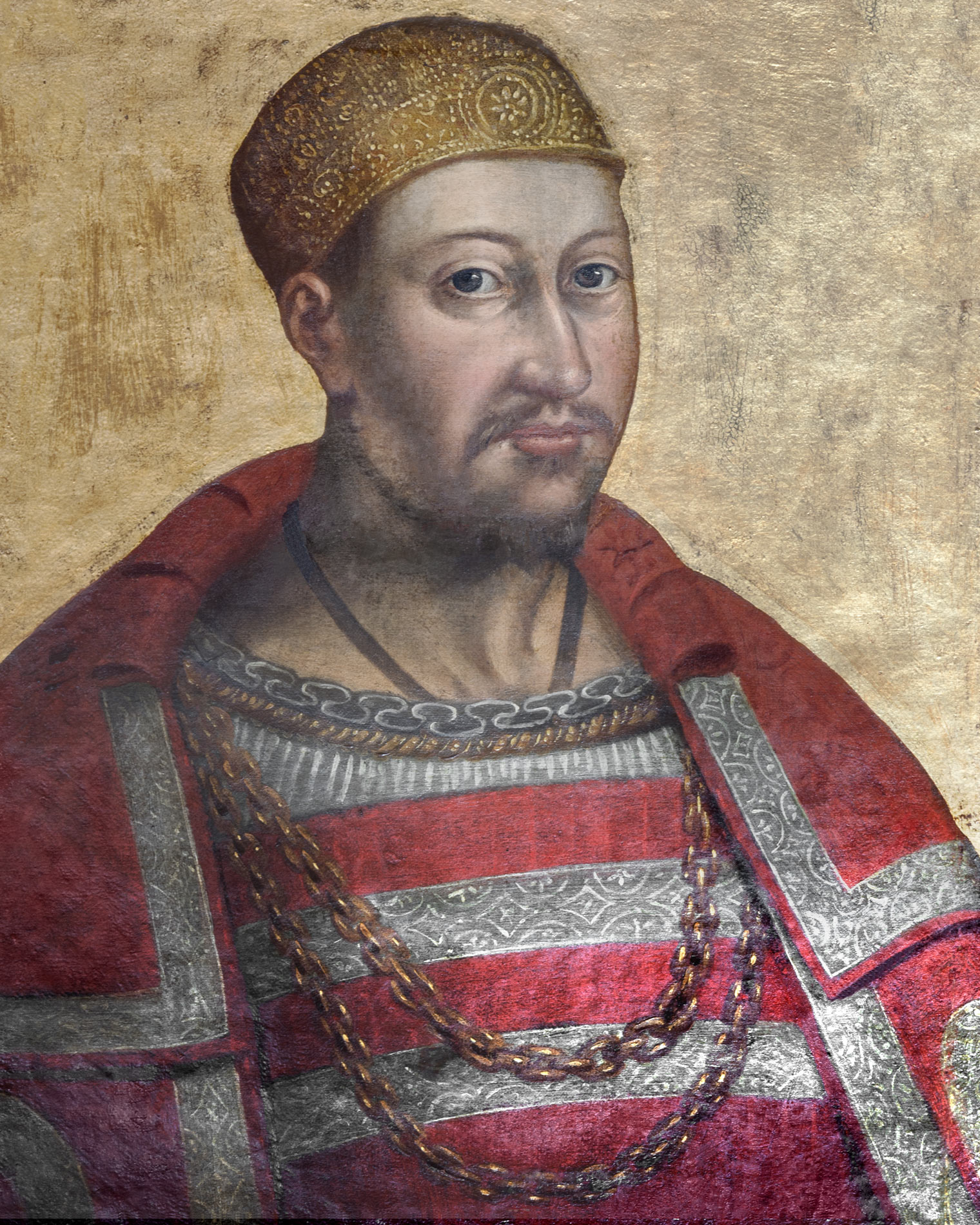
- 15th-century painting

Edler Herr of Lippe
- Reign: 11 August 1429 – 2 April 1511
- Predecessor: Simon IV
- Successor: Simon V
- Born: 4 December 1428
- Died: 2 April 1511 (aged 82)
- Buried: Klosterkirche, Blomberg
- Noble family: House of Lippe
- Spouse: Anna of Holstein-Schauenburg
- Issue Detail: Simon V, Count of Lippe
- Father: Simon IV, Lord of Lippe
- Mother: Margaret of Brunswick-Grubenhagen

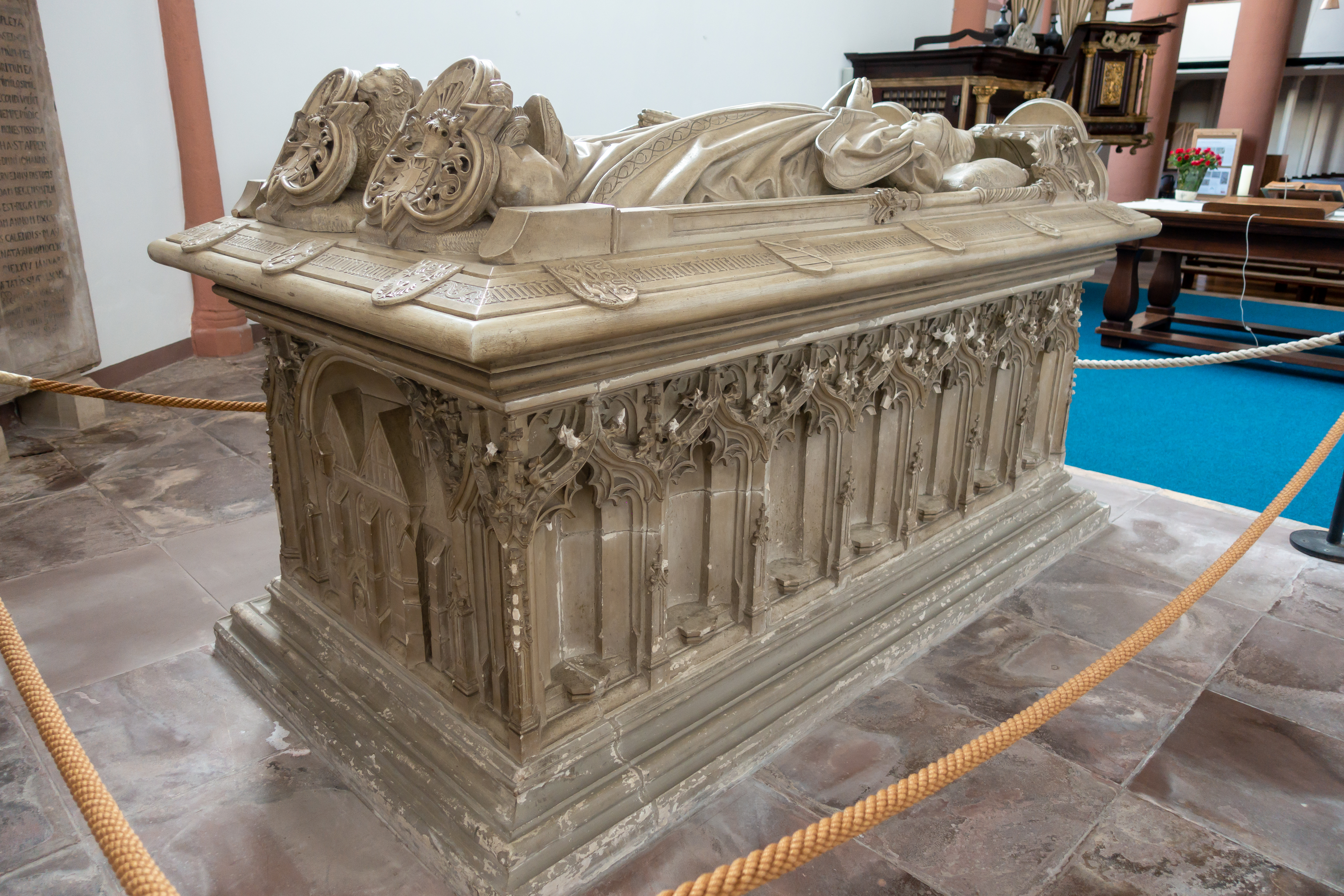
Tomb in Blomberg's Klosterkirche

Bernard VII (German: Bernhard VII. zur Lippe; 4 December 1428 – 2 April 1511) was the ruler of the Lordship of Lippe from 1429 until his death. Because of the many bloody feuds in which he was involved, he was nicknamed "the Bellicose" (der Kriegerische). As Edler Herr ('noble lord') of Lippe for 81 years, he was the longest-ever ruling European monarch.

== Life ==
He was the son of Lord Simon IV of Lippe and his wife, Margaret of Brunswick-Grubenhagen. He inherited Lippe in 1429, before his first birthday. He stood under the regency and guardianship of his uncle Otto. After Otto died in 1446, his great-uncle Archbishop Dietrich II of Cologne was appointed regent. Dietrich was represented in Lippe by his Amtmann, Johann Möllenbeck.

In 1444, Bernard VII concluded a treaty with Duke Adolph I of Cleves-Mark, in which he ceded to Adolph a 50% share in the city of Lippstadt, which had been mortgaged to Cleves. At the same time, he joined an alliance, which made him a party in the so-called Feud of Soest against Archbishop Dietrich II of Cologne. In 1447, Dietrich called in a Bohemian army, which devastated the countryside in Lippe and levelled the town of Blomberg to the ground. The Bohemians also besieged the cities of Lippstadt and Soest, but were unsuccessful.

After the feud had been settled in 1449, Bernard took up residence at Blomberg Castle. In 1468, he moved to Detmold, which at the time was the smallest city in Lippe, with only 350 inhabitants. He expanded the Detmold Castle; an inscription in the old castle tower dated 1470 is a reminder of this.

Bernard was involved in a large number of feuds against various enemies, with shifting alliances. In 1469, he supported Landgrave Louis II, Landgrave of Lower Hesse against his brother Henry III, Landgrave of Upper Hesse. On the other hand, in 1464, he supported his own brother, Prince-Bishop Simon III of Paderborn against Louis II of Lower Hesse when they fought the Hesse-Paderborn Feud about Calenberg Castle.

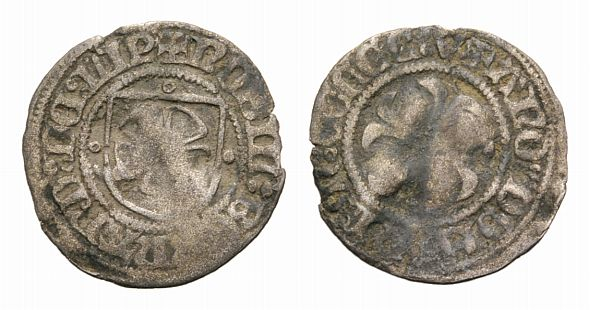
Coin issued in 1505 near the end of Bernard's reign

== Marriage and issue ==
From his marriage to Anna, the daughter of Count Otto II of Holstein-Schauenburg, he had the following children:

Location of Lippe within the Empire (map from 1560, 49 years after Bernard VII's death)

- Anna (b. c. 1450), married:
  1. Otto VI, Count of Hoya
  2. John II, Count of Nassau-Beilstein (d. 1513)
- Margaret (b. c. 1452), married to John I, Count of Rietberg
- Elisabeth (b. c. 1460), married:
  1. John II, Count of Spiegelberg
  2. Rudolf VII, Count of Diepholz
- Ermengarda (c. 1460 – 24 August 1524), married Jobst I, Count of Hoya (1466–1507)
- Simon V of Lippe (1471–1536), married:
  1. Walburga of Bronkhorst
  2. Magdalene of Mansfeld-Mittelort
- Bernard
- Agnes

== See also ==
- List of longest-reigning monarchs

Bernard VII of Lippe House of Lippe Born: 4 December 1428 Died: 2 April 1511
Preceded by Simon IV	Lord of Lippe; 1429–1511	Succeeded by Simon V
