= Conrad IV of Rietberg =

Conrad IV, Count of Rietberg
- Born: c. 1371
- Died: 21 June 1428
- Buried: Marienfeld Abbey
- Noble family: Werl-Arnsberg-Cuyk
- Spouse: Irmgard of Diepholz
- Issue Detail: Conrad V, Count of Rietberg
- Father: Otto II
- Mother: Adelheid of Lippe

Conrad IV, Count of Rietberg (c. 1371 – 21 June 1428) was Count of Rietberg from 1389 until his death.

He was the son of Count Otto II of Rietberg and his wife Adelheid of Lippe. He inherited the County of Rietberg when his father died on 18 July 1389.

== Death ==
Conrad died on 21 June 1428. He was buried in the family grave of the Counts of Rietberg in Marienfeld Abbey. He shared a tomb stone with his wife Irmgard:

Anno Dni. MCCCCXXVI 9 Kal. April. obiit
Nobilis Ermegardis comitissa de Retberge,
Cuius anima requiescat in pace. Amen †
Anno Dni. MCCCCXXVIII XII Kal. Jun. obiit
nobilis Conradus comes de Retberghe.
Cuius anim req. In p. †

In English translation:

In the year of our Lord 1426, on 24 March,
The noble wife Irmgard, Countess of Rietberg died.
May her soul rest in peace. Amen.
In the year of our Lord 1428, on 21 June,
The noble Lord Conrad, Count of Rietberg died.
May his soul rest in peace

== Marriage and issue ==
On 24 April 1399, he married Irmgard (d. 24 March 1426), a daughter of John of Diepholz (d. 1422) and Kunigunde of Oldenburg. With her he had three children:

- Conrad V (c. 1401 – 31 October 1472), succeeded Conrad IV as Count of Rietberg
- John (mentioned between 1415 and 1452)
- Adelaide of Rietberg (d. 1436/1439), married Count Otto of Hoya (d. after 14 May 1436)

Some sources say that Conrad IV was also married to Beatrix of Bronckhorst (d. 1392).

== Footnotes ==
Conrad IV of Rietberg Werl-Arnsberg-Cuyk Born: c. 1371 21 June
Preceded by Otto II	Count of Rietberg; 1389–1428	Succeeded by Conrad V
