= Gumprecht II of Neuenahr =

- Born: c. 1400
- Died: 9 March 1484
- Spouse: Margaret of Limburg-Broich
- Father: Gumprecht I of Neuenahr
- Mother: Philippa of Loon-Heinsberg

Gumprecht II of Neuenahr (c. 1400 – 9 March 1484) was a German nobleman. He inherited the County of Limburg via his wife.

== Background ==
Gumprecht was the son of Gumprecht I of Neuenahr (c. 1370 – c. 1430) and his wife Countess Philippa of Loon-Heinsberg (c. 1370 – c. 1430)

== Life ==
When his father died in 1430, Gumprecht inherited Alpen, Rösberg, Garsdorf and the office of Hereditary Bailiff of Cologne. In 1435, Gumprecht and his wife Margaret received half the Lordship of Bedburg from her father, Count William I of Limburg-Broich. In 1442, they also received the County of Limburg. When William I died in February 1459, Gumprecht and Margaret inherited Hackenbroich and the other half of Bedburg.

However, Dietrich VI, William II and Henry. who were grandsons of William I's younger brother Dietrich IV, also claimed the County of Limburg and on 25 June 1459 Duke Gerhard VII of Jülich-Berg enfeoffed them with the county. Gumprecht refused to accept this, and an armed conflict ensued. Troops of the three brothers laid siege to Hohenlimburg Castle and captured it. The conflict was resolved by arbitration in 1460. Arbiter was Archbishop Dietrich II of Cologne. He ruled that the County of Limburg should be administered jointly by all parties involved as a condominium and that a castle peace should be observed.

== Marriage and issue ==
On 5 May 1425, Gumprecht married Margaret (d. 1479), the daughter of Count William I of Limburg-Broich and Matilda of Reifferscheid. They had the following children:

- Frederick (after 1425 – 22 June 1468), killed in Wachtendonk on the day before the Battle of Straelen, married on 29 September 1461 to Eva of Linnep (before 1451 – 1483)
- John, prior in Bonn
- William (d. 1497), married in 1485 to Walburga, the daughter of Kuno of Manderscheid and Walburga of Horn
- Dietrich, a canon in Cologne
- Philippa (d. 27 June 1494), married in 1468 with John VII of Salm-Reifferscheidt-Dyck (d. 26 December 1479)
- Elisabeth (d. 1484), married Frederick I of Sombreffe (1421-1485)
- Margaret
- Matilda (c. 1445 – 26 May 1465), buried in Flechtdorf Abbey, married on 17 January 1464 to Count Otto IV of Waldeck (before 1438 – 14 October 1495)
- Jakobe (1426 – 23 February 1492), married on 24 June 1450 to Count Conrad V of Rietberg (d. 31 October 1472)

Gumprecht II of Neuenahr Born: c. 1400 Died: 9 March 1484
Preceded by William I	Count of Limburg after 1460 in condominium 1442-1484	Succeeded by Gumprecht I
