= John I of Rietberg =

John I, Count of Rietberg
- Born: c. 1450
- Died: 1516
- Noble family: Werl-Arnsberg-Cuyk
- Spouse: Margaret of Lippe
- Issue Detail: Otto III, Count of Rietberg
- Father: Conrad V, Count of Rietberg
- Mother: Jacoba of Neuenahr

Count John I of Rietberg (c. 1450 – 1516) was Count of Rietberg from 1472 until his death. He was the eldest son of Count Conrad V and his wife Jacoba of Neuenahr. When his father died in 1472, he inherited the County of Rietberg.

During a traditional boundary inspection tour on 1 May 1474, he shared a keg of beer with the citizens of Rietberg. In 1477, he promised the mayor and city council of Rietberg to restore their ancient rights and privileges and grant them the same rights as the city of Lippstadt.

Also in 1477, John's brother Conrad VI of Rietberg travelled to Rome with John of Roden and his wife Lucke. They raised money for this journey by mortgaging Aldehof manor in Bokel.

On 24 April 1481, John I and his wife Margaret joined Marienfeld Abbey, which was led by abbot John V Wineken. On 13 May 1481, John donated an altar in the abbey for the souls of his parents and siblings. As payment, he transferred the Horntemannsgut in Gütersloh parish, however, with an option to buy it back for 200 Rhenish guilders. He also donated an altar to the castle chapel in Rietberg.

== Marriage and issue ==
Before 1475, he married Margaret of Lippe. They had nine children:

- Otto III (d. 18 December 1535), Count of Rietberg 1516–1535
- Bernard (d. 15 October 1501), Dean of Osnabrück and Cologne
- Conrad (d. 1500), a canon of Cologne
- John (d. 1530), a canon of Cologne
- Simon, mentioned in documents 1486–1494
- Elisabeth (d. July 1512), married on 27 July 1497 Edzard I of East Frirsia
- Emgard (d. after 1535), married before 1499 to Count Otto IX of Tecklenburg
- Margaret, mentioned in 1491
- Frederick (d. 1539), a canon of Cologne

John I of Rietberg Werl-Arnsberg-Cuyk Born: c. 1450 Died: 1516
Preceded by Conrad V	Count of Rietberg; 1472–1516	Succeeded by Otto III
