= Conrad V of Rietberg =

- Died: 31 October 1472
- Buried: Marienfeld Abbey
- Noble family: House of Rietberg
- Spouse: Jacoba of Neuenahr
- Issue Detail: John I, Count of Rietberg
- Father: Conrad IV, Count of Rietberg
- Mother: Irmgard of Diepholz

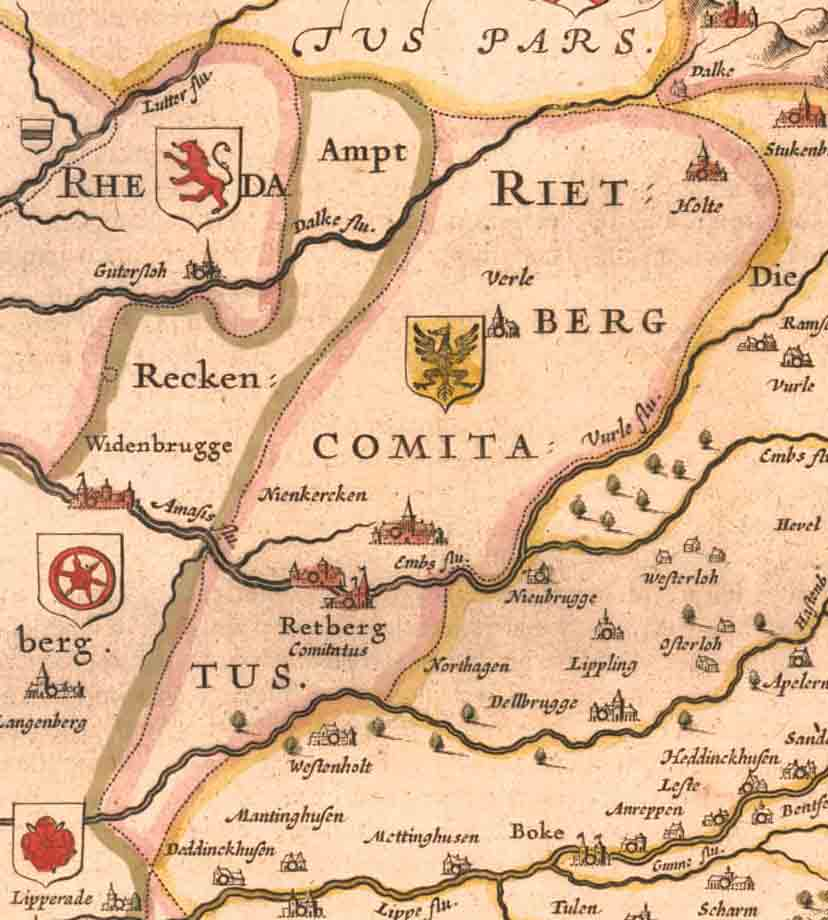
Map of Rietberg in 1650

Count Conrad V of Rietberg (died 31 October 1472) was Count of Rietberg from 1428 until his death. His father was Count Conrad IV of Rietberg.

== Marriage and issue ==
Conrad married before 1450 to Jacoba (d. 23 February 1492), a daughter of Count Gumprecht II of Neuenahr and Margaret of Limburg-Broich. They had six children:

- John I, succeeded Conrad V in 1472 as Count of Rietberg and ruled until his death in 1516
- Emegart, married in 1443 to Arnd Balke
- Conrad (d, 1508), was elected prince-bishop of Osnabrück on 2 February 1482, and became prince-bishop of Münster in 1497
- Simon, was a canon at Cologne
- Gumprecht, was mentioned only in 1468
- Margaret, married on 10 March 1483 to Duke Frederick III of Brunswick-Calenberg-Göttingen

== His grave ==
Conrad V was buried in a section of the cloister of the former Cistercian Marienfeld Abbey which has not been preserved. His grave stone contained a Latin text:

Mille quadringentis septuagesimo secundo annis Transactis,
Mensis the penultimate Octobris pius et illustris liberalis
Conrad de Reberg comes, proelio miles,
A migrans mundo divina quiescat pace.

In English translation:

After 1472 years were over, on the penultimate day of October, did the respected and bountiful Count Conrad of Rietberg leave the worldly battle field as a soldier. May he rest in the peace of God.

The grave stone of his wife also contained Latin text:

Quam premit high sacrum coniux veneranda sepulchro,
Retbergi comitis, Jacoba dicta fuit.
Illustrious genuit *** generosa propago (Jacoba von Neuenahr)
Hanc comitum, inde par nupserat illa thoro
Excoluit Quam format, vitam, prudentia, virtus
Candida apud superos vivat it illa pios
MCCCCXCII, nocte sancti Matthiae

In English translation:

The venerable woman on whom this unholy grave stone rests, was Jacoba, the wife of the Count of Rietberg. She sprang forth from a noble family and she married in par. She was distinguished by her beauty and her wisdom and virtue distinguished her life. May she lie without sin in the righteous heaven. On the eve of St. Matthias, 1492.

== Legacy ==
Conrad V built a chapel in the castle at Rietberg; it was consacreted on 2 July 1464.

In 1456, he had to give up his imperial immediacy and accept Rietberg as a fief from the Landgraviate of Hesse, in return for a compensation of 600 Rhenish guilders.

== Footnotes ==
Conrad V of Rietberg House of Rietberg Died: 31 October 1472
Preceded by Conrad IV	Count of Rietberg; 1428–1472	Succeeded by John I
