= Marienfeld Abbey =

Church in Harsewinkel, Germany

Coordinates: 51°56′47″N 8°16′52″E

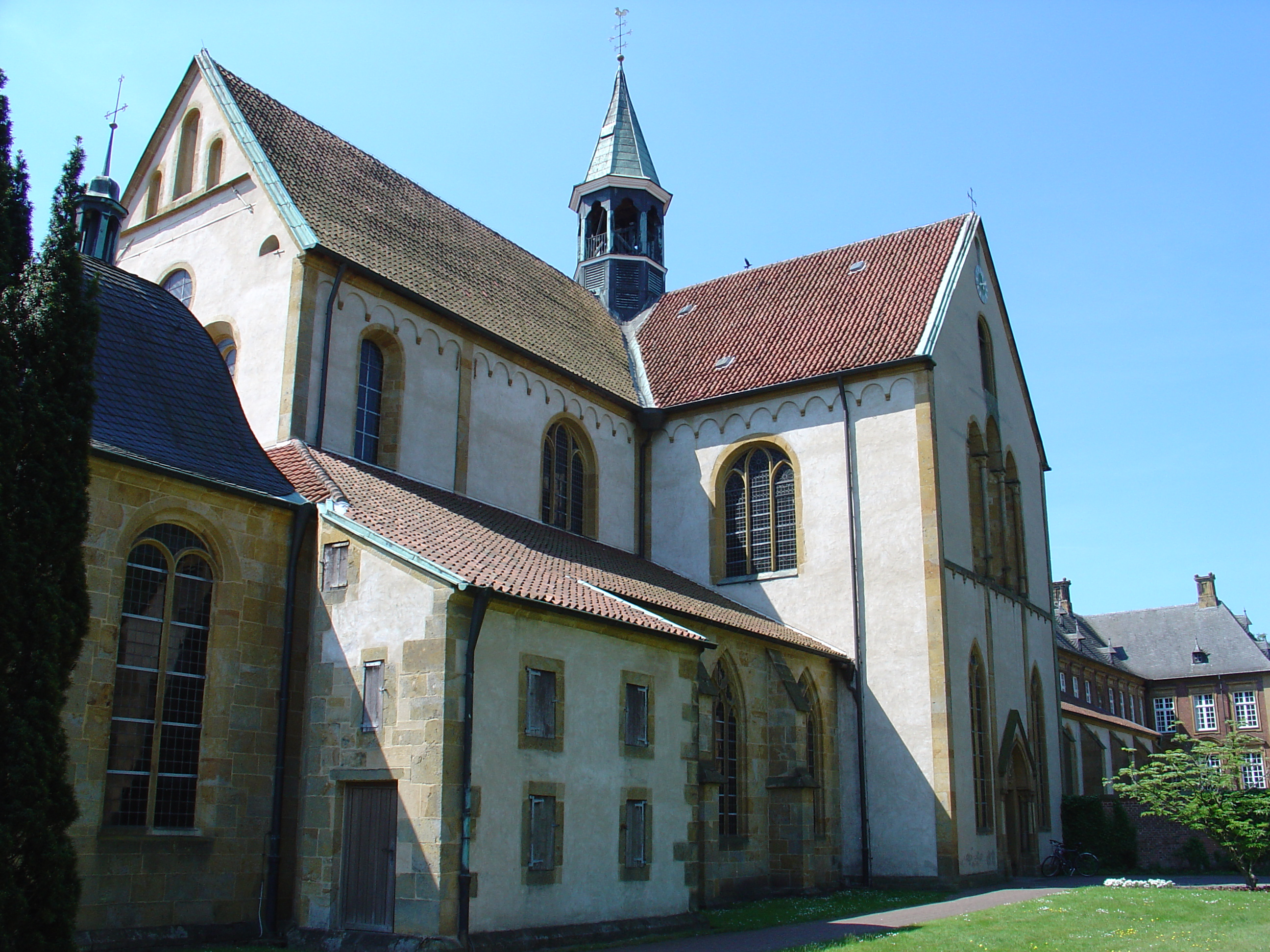
The former abbey church

Marienfeld Abbey is a former Cistercian abbey in the Marienfeld district of Harsewinkel, in the district of Gütersloh, Germany. It was founded in 1185 by monks from Hardehausen Abbey and dissolved in 1803 after German Mediatisation, becoming state property and then in 1804 a parish church. The monastic buildings were demolished, but since Pentecost 2004 two Benedictine monks have lived at the church, restoring its monastic status.

== See also ==
- List of abbots of Marienfeld
