= List of countesses of East Frisia =

== Countess of East Frisia ==
=== House of Cirksena, 1464–1654 ===
Picture	Name	Father	Birth	Marriage	Became Countess	Ceased to be Countess	Death	Spouse
	Theda Ukena	Uko van Oldersum	1434	1453	1464; County created	27 September 1466 husband's death	17 September 1494	Ulrich I
	Elisabeth of Rietberg	John I, Count of Rietberg	1475	8 July 1498		27 September 1466 husband's death	13 July 1512	Edzard I
	Anna of Oldenburg	John V, Count of Oldenburg (Oldenburg)	14 November 1501	6 May 1530		24 September 1540 husband's death	10 November 1575	Enno II
	Katharina of Sweden	Gustav I of Sweden (Vasa)	6 June 1539	1 October 1559		1 March 1599 husband's death	21 December 1610	Edzard II
	Anna of Holstein-Gottorp	Adolf, Duke of Holstein-Gottorp (Holstein-Gottorp)	27 February 1575	28 January 1598	1 March 1599 husband's accession	24 April 1610		Enno III
	Juliana of Hesse-Darmstadt	Louis V, Landgrave of Hesse-Darmstadt (Hesse-Darmstadt)	14 April 1606	5 March 1631		1 November 1648 husband's death	15 January 1659	Ulrich II

== Princess of East Frisia ==
=== House of Cirksena, 1654–1744 ===
Picture	Name	Father	Birth	Marriage	Became Princess	Ceased to be Princess	Death	Spouse
	Juliana Sophia of Barby-Mühlingen	Albrecht Friedrich, Count of Barby-Mühlingen (Barby)	14 April 1636	7 November 1656		4 April 1660 husband's death	12 May 1677	Enno Louis
	Christine Charlotte of Württemberg	Eberhard III, Duke of Württemberg (Württemberg)	21 October 1645	10 May 1662		6 June 1665 husband's death	16 May 1699	George Christian
	Eberhadine Sophie of Oettingen-Oettingen	Albrecht Ernst I, Prince of Oettingen-Oettingen (Oettingen-Oettingen)	16 August 1666	3 March 1685		30 October 1700		Christian Eberhard
	Christine Louise of Nassau-Idstein	George August, Count of Nassau-Idstein (Nassau)	31 March 1691	24 September 1709		13 April 1723		George Albert
	Sophie Caroline of Brandenburg-Kulmbach	Christian Heinrich, Margrave of Brandenburg-Bayreuth-Kulmbach (Hohenzollern)	31 March 1705	8 December 1723		12 June 1734 husband's death	7 June 1764	George Albert
	Sophie Wilhelmine of Brandenburg-Bayreuth	George Frederick Charles, Margrave of Brandenburg-Bayreuth (Hohenzollern)	8 July 1714	25 May 1634	12 June 1734 husband's accession	25 May 1744 husband's death	7 September 1749	Charles Edzard
In 1744 East Frisia was annexed to Prussia.

== See also ==
- List of counts of East Frisia
- List of East Frisian people
