= County of Norden =

Territory in the Holy Roman Empire

County of Norden Grafschaft Norden (German) Graafschap Norden (Dutch) Gróófskup Nörden (East Frisian Low Saxon)
- 1463–1464
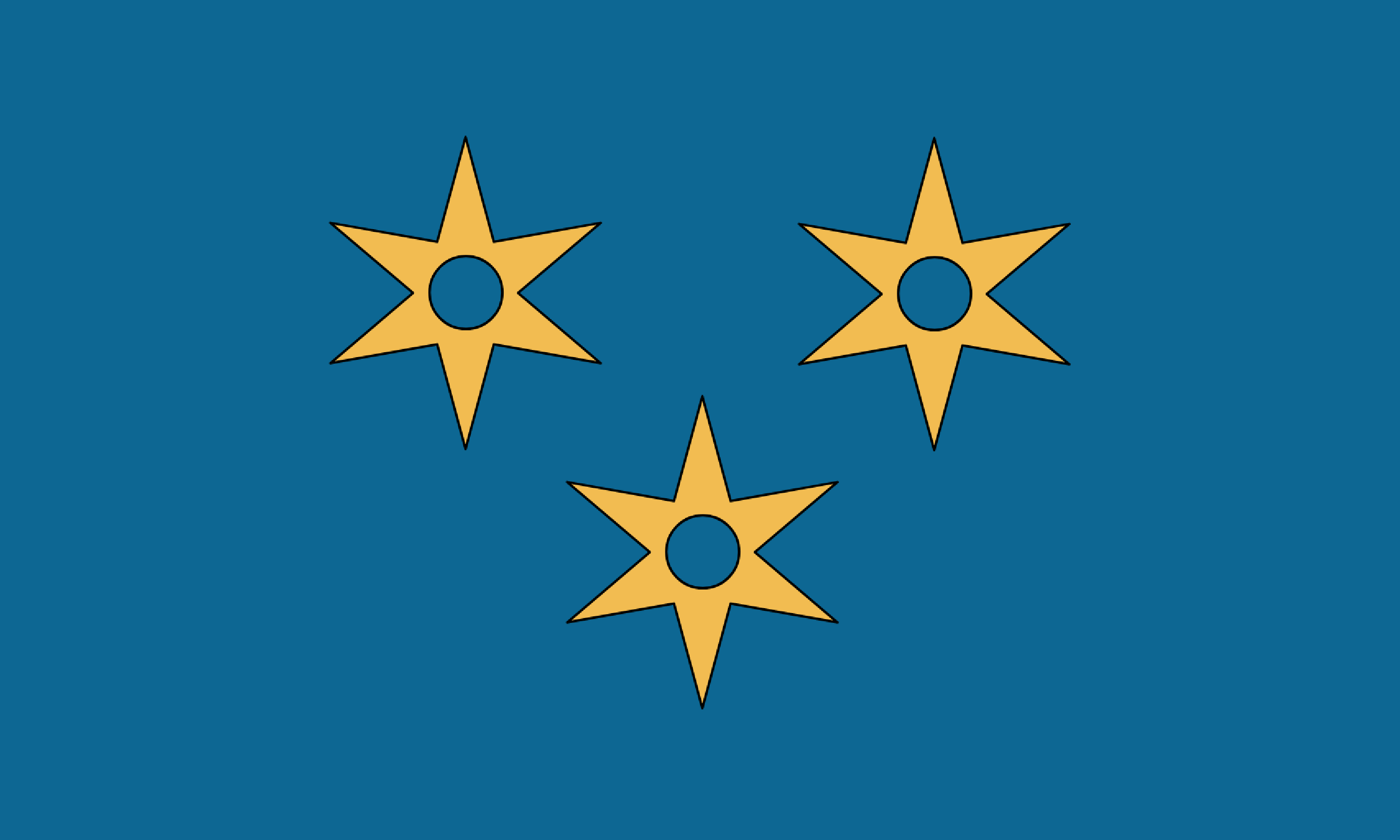
- Flag

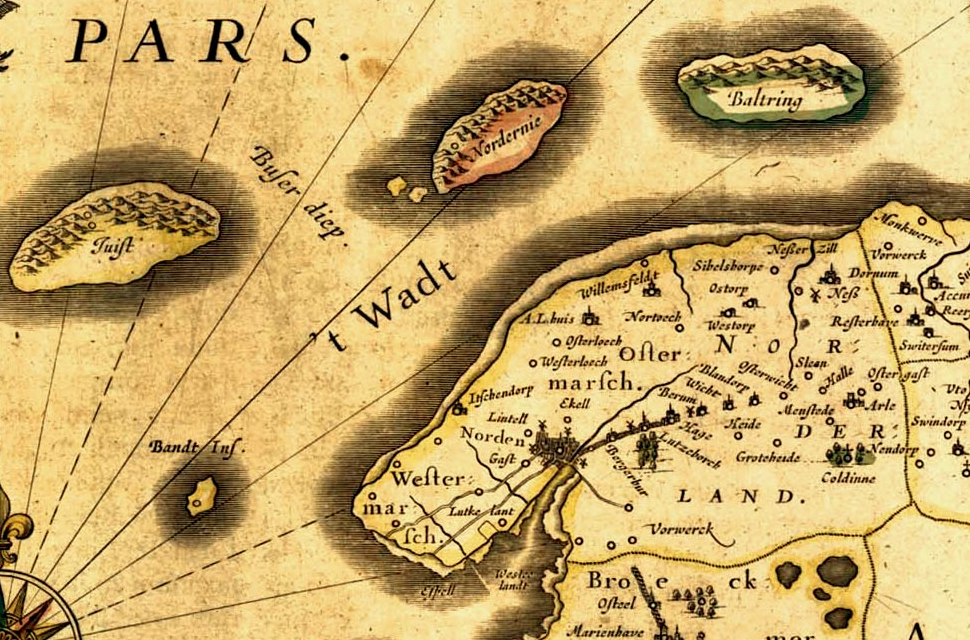
- Norderland around 1600, by Ubbo Emmius
- Status: Imperial county of the Holy Roman Empire (1463–1464)
- Capital: Norden
- Common languages: East Frisian (until the 17th century); East Frisian Low Saxon (from the 16th century); German
- Religion: Catholicism
- Government: Feudal monarchy
- Count of Norden
  - 1463–1464: Ulrich I (first count)
  - 1661–1668: Edzard Ferdinand I (as an appanage)
- Historical era: Middle Ages
  - Elevation of Ulrich I to Imperial Count: 14 June 1463
  - Incorporation in the County of East Frisia: 1 October 1464
Preceded by	Succeeded by
Norderland	Amt Norden; Amt Berum
- Today part of: Germany

The County of Norden (German: Grafschaft Norden) was an imperial county of the Holy Roman Empire in the region of East Frisia in the northwest of the present-day state of Lower Saxony in Germany.

The county originated from the historical district of Norderland in the northwest of East Frisia. When the system of Frisian freedom began to collapse in the fourteenth century, Norderland, like other areas in Frisia, saw the rise of the chieftains. They built castles and began to exercise power in their area. The castles of Norderland fell one by one into the hands of the powerful Cirksena dynasty. On 14 June 1463, they were proclaimed 'Count of Norden' by Emperor Frederick III. With that, the county was born. A year later, on 1 October 1464, the County of East Frisia was founded. With this, the short-lived existence of the County of Norden came to an end. Only between 1661 and 1668 did it serve as an appanage for Edzard Ferdinand of East Frisia, the third son of Ulrich II of East Frisia.

== History ==
=== Chieftains of the Norderland ===
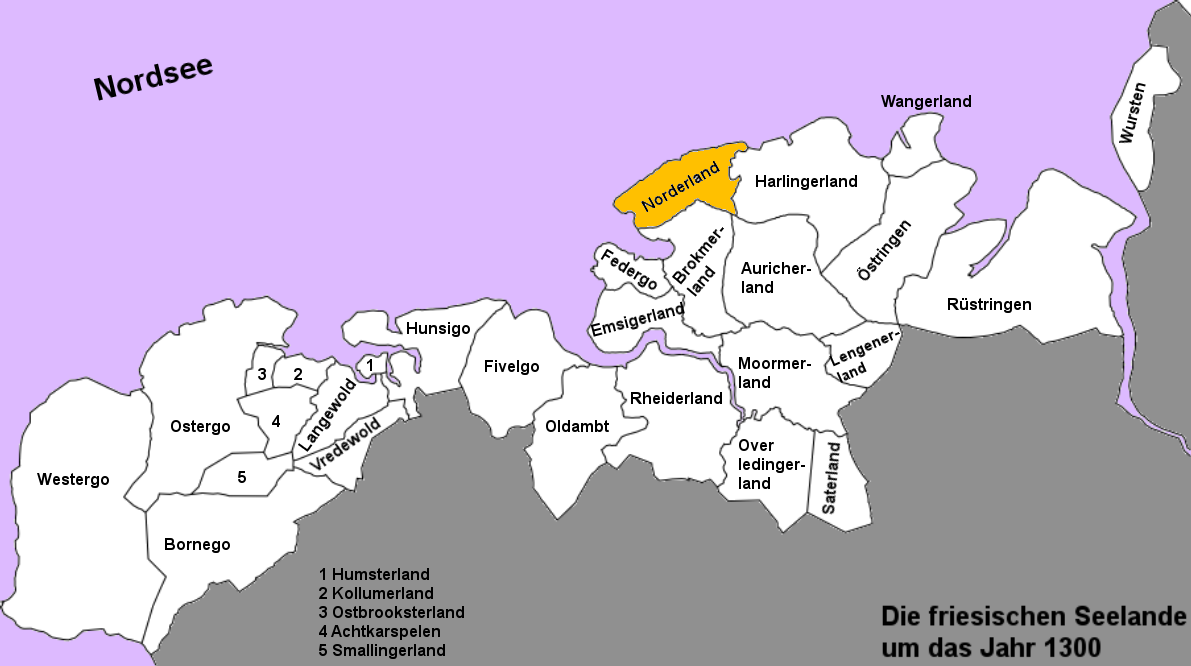
Norderland around 1300

The history of the area as a county begins with the East Frisian chieftain family Idzinga. Everhardus Idzinga was mentioned in 1367 as 'Chieftain of the Norderland. This family owned two castles in and around the city of Norden. He was succeeded by his daughter Djudlef. She married Luerd Abdena, who after the marriage took his wife's name and was henceforth known as Luerd Idzinga. They had one son: Eberhard Idzinga. Eberhard was a loyal follower of Keno II tom Brok and he died in the Ommelanden in 1414 during one of Keno's conquests.

Eberhard had together with his wife Sibbe Allena, daughter of the powerful chieftain Folkmar Allena of Osterhusen, one daughter: Hyma Idzinga. She in turn was married to Udo Ukena; the eldest son of the powerful chieftain Focko Ukena of the Moormerland. Her husband was overthrown by the Cirksena dynasty in 1433 in the Battle of Bargebur. Udo died in this battle and had to surrender his possessions to the Cirksenas. Hyma was allowed to keep her possessions in the Norderland, but she had to include in her will that the possessions would be inherited by the House of Cirksena upon her death. This happened in 1439.

The powerful chieftain family Attena also had possessions in the Norderland. Eylwerd Attena built the Attenaburg in Norden around 1340. He too was known as 'Chieftain of the Norderland'. His inheritance passed to his son Hero Attena and then to his grandson Lütet Attena. Lütet and his father were sentenced to death by Keno II tom Brok around 1410. Lütet's possessions were transferred to Enno Edzardisna. The Attenaburg was renamed 'Ennenburg'.

=== Foundation of the county ===
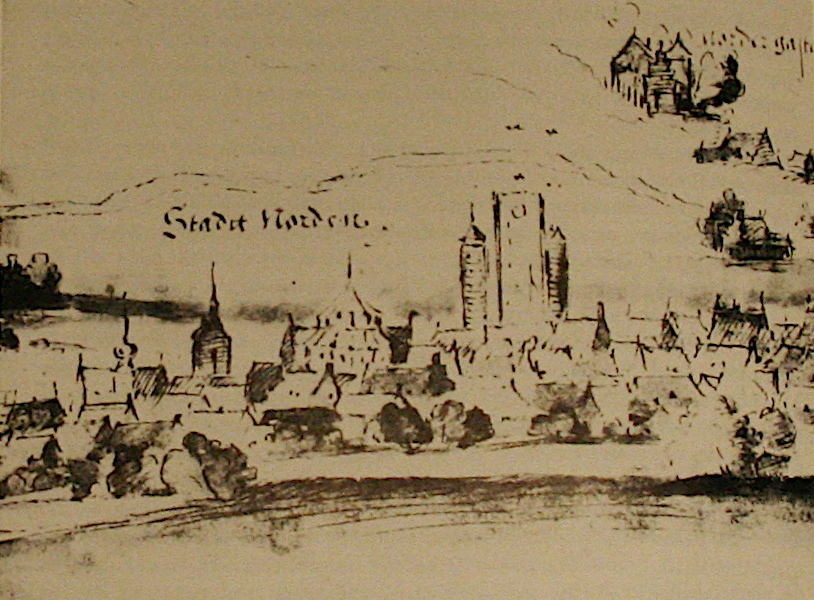
Norden around 1590

In the process, the Cirksena family had come into possession of many properties in the Norderland. The important chieftain of Greetsiel, Ulrich I, was the sole heir of his family after the death of his half-brother Edzard Cirksena in the mid-15th century. Ulrich I had thereby become by far the most powerful chieftain in East Frisia. In order to strengthen his status, he tried to legitimize his position by turning to Emperor Frederick III of the Holy Roman Empire. He wanted to be recognized as imperial count of the entire East Frisian peninsula. However, the first attempt to achieve this failed partially. Only Ulrich I's possessions in the Norderland were elevated to a county on 14 June 1463: the County of Norden was born. A year later Ulrich I made another attempt and this time he was more successful. On 1 October 1464 he was proclaimed 'Count of Norden, Emden and Emisgonien in East Frisia'. The County of Norden was thus incorporated into the new Imperial County of East Frisia.

=== The county as an appanage ===
On 19 January 1661, the brothers George Christian and Edzard Ferdinand concluded a treaty in which Edzard Ferdinand renounced a role in the administration of the County of East Frisia in exchange for an annual allowance. He was also assigned Norden as appanage, after which he was known as 'Count of Norden'.

== See also ==
- East Frisia
- East Frisia (peninsula)
- History of East Frisia
- County of East Frisia
- List of East Frisian people
