= List of counts of East Frisia =

The counts and princes of East Frisia from the East Frisian noble House of Cirksena descended from a line of East Frisian chieftains from Greetsiel. The county came into existence when Emperor Frederick III raised Ulrich I the son of a local chieftain to the status of Imperial Count in 1464.

The most important ruler from the House of Cirksena was Edzard the Great (1462–1528), under whose leadership the Imperial County of East Frisia reached its greatest extent. During his reign the Reformation spread throughout East Frisia.

In 1654 the Cirksena were elevated to princes by the emperor. Charles Edzard, the last ruler from the House of Cirksena, died without issue during the night of 25/26 May 1744 (reportedly from a glass of buttermilk, which is said to have drunk after a hunt). Immediately thereafter, the county passed to King Frederick II of Prussia.

== Medieval chieftains in East Frisia ==
=== Broke / Marienhafe ===
==== Toma Brok family ====
- 1347-1376: Keno I tom Brok
- 1376-1389: Ocko I tom Brok
- 1389-1399: Widzeld tom Brok
- 1399-1417: Keno II tom Brok (under regency of his mother Foelke Kampana)
- 1417-1427: Ocko II tom Brok (under regency of his grandmother, Foelke); deposed, died 1435

=== Dornum / Nesse ===
==== Attena family ====
- ?-1410: Hero Attena
- ?-1410: Lutet Attena (in Norderburg)
  - ?: Eger Attena (in Westerburg)
- ?-1433: Sibet I Attena
- 1433-1473: Sibet II Attena

=== Emden ===
- Abdena family

=== Faldern ===
- Aildesna family

=== Greetsiel / Norden ===
==== Cirksena family ====
- ?-1430: Liudward
- 1430-1450: Enno Edzardisna, son-in-law
- 1450-1466: Ulrich, son, in 1464 was raised to Count.

=== Innhausen / Östringen ===
- Tjarksena family

=== Langwarden / Innhausen / Knyphausen ===
- Onneken, later named Innhausen and Knyphausen family

=== Lütetsburg / Pewsum ===
- Manninga family

=== Neermoor / Leer ===
==== Ukena family ====
- Benno
- Uko
- 1427-1436: Focko Ukena and his son Uko Fockena (1427-1432)

=== Osterhusen ===
==== Osterhusen / Canhusen ====
- ?-1406: Allena family

=== Rüstringen / Bant ===
- Wiemken family (Papinga)

=== Wirdum ===
- Beninga family

== Counts of East Frisia ==
=== House of Cirksena ===
==== Table of rulers ====
Ruler	Born	Reign	Ruling part/ County	Consort	Death	Notes
Ulrich I	1408; Norden; Son of Enno Edzardisna and Gela of Manslagt	1464 – 26 September 1466	County of East Frisia	A first wife no children Theda Ukena; 1455 six children	26 September 1466; Emden aged 57-58	First Count of East Frisia. Emperor Frederick III raised Ulrich to the status of Imperial Count in 1464.
Regency of Theda Ukena (1466-1480)						Had no descendants. The county went to his brother.
Enno I	1 June 1460; First son of Ulrich I and Theda Ukena	26 September 1466 – 19 February 1491	County of East Frisia	Unmarried	19 February 1491; Friedeburg aged 30	Had no descendants. The county went to his brother.
Edzard I the Great	15 January 1462; Greetsiel; Second son of Ulrich I and Theda Ukena	19 February 1491 – 14 February 1528	County of East Frisia	Elisabeth of Rietberg; 1498 three children	14 February 1528; Emden aged 62	
Enno II	1505; Son of Edzard I and Elisabeth of Rietberg	14 February 1528 – 24 September 1540	County of East Frisia	Anna of Oldenburg; 1530 six children	24 September 1540; Emden aged 34-35	Eldest son of the previous. He had a brother: Johan I of East Frisia: their father, Edzard I had introduced primogeniture in the county of East Frisia, so that Enno II inherited the county alone. Johan had to hold back. Despite his ambitions, he always acknowledged his brother's rights and did not dispute the inheritance. Despite this, Johan is counted as I.
Regency of Anna of Oldenburg (1540-1561)						Sons of Enno II, ruled together, until 1561 under regency of their mother. This coregency implies that the primogenture law issued by their grandfather, Edzard the Great, may have been revoked.
Edzard II	24 June 1532; Greetsiel; First son of Enno II and Anna of Oldenburg	24 September 1540 – 1 March 1599	County of East Frisia	Catherine of Sweden; 1 October 1559; Stockholm ten children	1 March 1599; Aurich aged 66	Sons of Enno II, ruled together, until 1561 under regency of their mother. This coregency implies that the primogenture law issued by their grandfather, Edzard the Great, may have been revoked.
Johan II	29 September 1538; Aurich; Second son of Enno II and Anna of Oldenburg	24 September 1540 – 29 September 1591	County of East Frisia	Unmarried	29 September 1591; Stickhausen Castle aged 53	Sons of Enno II, ruled together, until 1561 under regency of their mother. This coregency implies that the primogenture law issued by their grandfather, Edzard the Great, may have been revoked.
Catherine of Sweden	6 June 1539; Stockholm; Daughter of Gustav I of Sweden and Margaret Leijonhufvud	1 March 1599 – 21 December 1610	County of East Frisia (at Berum and Norden)	Edzard II; 1 October 1559; Stockholm ten children	21 December 1610; Berum aged 71	Inherited from her husband some towns in East Frisia, which she ruled autonomously. After her death, her domains were reabsorbed in the county.
Enno III	30 September 1563; Aurich; First son of Edzard II and Catherine of Sweden	26 May 1586 – 28 January 1600	County of Rietberg	Walburgis, Countess of Rietberg; 28 January 1581 three children Anna of Holstein-Gottorp; 28 January 1598 three children	19 August 1625; Leerort aged 61	Probably inherited Rietberg from his first wife, or ruled it in name of his daughter. The Treaty of Berum (1600) formally divided the inheritance of Walburga between her daughters, and Sabina Catharina got the County of Rietberg.
Enno III	30 September 1563; Aurich; First son of Edzard II and Catherine of Sweden	1 March 1599 – 19 August 1625	County of East Frisia	Walburgis, Countess of Rietberg; 28 January 1581 three children Anna of Holstein-Gottorp; 28 January 1598 three children	19 August 1625; Leerort aged 61	Probably inherited Rietberg from his first wife, or ruled it in name of his daughter. The Treaty of Berum (1600) formally divided the inheritance of Walburga between her daughters, and Sabina Catharina got the County of Rietberg.
Sabina Catharina	11 August 1582; Esens; Daughter of Enno III and Walburgis, Countess of Rietberg	28 January 1600 – 31 May 1618	County of Rietberg	3 March 1601 eleven children	31 May 1618 aged 35	Inherited Rietberg from her mother, and ruled it apparently in name only (she was a minor by the time of her mother's death) until 1600. The county was only awarded to her by the Treaty of Berum (1600).
John III	1566; Aurich; Second son of Edzard II and Catherine of Sweden	31 May 1618 – 23 January 1625	County of Rietberg	3 March 1601 eleven children	23 January 1625; Rietberg aged 58-59	Brother of Enno III, ruled Rietberg after the death of his wife and niece.
Ernest Christopher	1 April 1606; First son of John III and Sabina Catharina	23 January 1625 – 31 December 1640	County of Rietberg	Albertine Marie of St. Martin; 10 November 1626 no children	31 December 1640; Cologne aged 34	Left no descendants. The county passed to his brother.
Rudolph Christian	2 June 1602; Hage; First son of Enno III and Anna of Holstein-Gottorp	19 August 1625 – 17 April 1628	County of East Frisia	Unmarried	17 April 1628; Hage aged 25	Half-brother of Sabina Catharina, inherited the main county of East Frisia. Left no descendants. The county passed to his brother.
Ulrich II	6 July 1605; Aurich; Second son of Enno III and Anna of Holstein-Gottorp	17 April 1628 – 1 November 1648	County of East Frisia	Juliana of Hesse-Darmstadt; 5 March 1631 three children	1 November 1648; Aurich aged 43	
John IV	31 May 1618; Rietberg; Second son of John III and Sabina Catharina	31 December 1640 – 7 August 1660	County of Rietberg	Anna Catharina Ernestine of Salm-Reiferscheid; 3 March 1647 five children	7 August 1660; Rietberg aged 42	
Regency of Juliana of Hesse-Darmstadt (1648-1651)						In 1654, the county was raised to a principality. Had no male descendants, and the principality passed to his brother.
Enno Louis	29 October 1632; Aurich; First son of Ulrich II and Juliana of Hesse-Darmstadt	1 November 1648 – 4 April 1660	County of East Frisia (until 1654) Principality of East Frisia (from 1654)	Justina Sophia of Barby-Mühlingen; 7 November 1656 two children	4 April 1660; Aurich aged 27	In 1654, the county was raised to a principality. Had no male descendants, and the principality passed to his brother.
George Christian	6 February 1634; Aurich; Second son of Ulrich II and Juliana of Hesse-Darmstadt	4 April 1660 – 6 June 1665	Principality of East Frisia	Christine Charlotte of Württemberg; 14 May 1662 three children	6 June 1665; Aurich aged 31	Brother of Enno Louis.
Regency of Anna Catharina Ernestine of Salm-Reiferscheid (1660-1666)						Left no descendants. The county passed to his brother.
Frederick William	16 September 1650; Rietberg; First son of John IV and Anna Catharina Ernestine of Salm-Reiferscheid	7 August 1660 – 7 October 1677	County of Rietberg	Unmarried	7 October 1677 near Strasbourg aged 27	Left no descendants. The county passed to his brother.
Regency of Christine Charlotte of Württemberg (1665-1690)						
Christian Everhard the Peaceable	1 October 1665; Esens; Son of George Christian and Christine Charlotte of Württemberg	6 June 1665 – 30 June 1708	Principality of East Frisia	Eberhadine Sophie of Oettingen-Oettingen; 7 November 1656 ten children Anna Juliana of Kleinau; 1701 (morganatic) one child	30 June 1708; Aurich aged 42	
Francis Adolph William	13 November 1651; Rietberg; Second son of John IV and Anna Catharina Ernestine of Salm-Reiferscheid	7 October 1677 – 15 March 1680	County of Rietberg	Unmarried	15 March 1690; Strasbourg aged 38	Brother of Frederick William, abdicated to become a canon, but remained regent for his younger brother (despite he was already an adult), and would return for the regency if his niece.
Regency of Canon Francis Adolph William, Count of Rietberg (1680-1685)						
Ferdinand Maximilian	8 May 1653; Rietberg; Third son of John IV and Anna Catharina Ernestine of Salm-Reiferscheid	15 March 1680 – 10 June 1687	County of Rietberg	Johannetta Elizabeth Franziska of Manderscheid-Blankenheim (26 September 1663-29 April 1704); 4 October 1685; Blankenheim one child	10 June 1687 aged 34	
Regency of Canon Francis Adolph William, Count of Rietberg (1687-1690); Regency of Friedrich Christian von Plettenberg and Hermann Werner von Wolff-Metternich (1690-1702, imperial appointment)						Ascended as a minor. After her death the county was inherited by the Kaunitz family.
Maria Ernestine Francisca	1 August 1686; Rietberg; Daughter of Ferdinand Maximilian and Johannetta Elizabeth Franziska of Manderscheid-Blankenheim	10 June 1687 – 1 January 1758	County of Rietberg	Maximilian Ulrich von Kaunitz; 6 August 1699 sixteen children	1 January 1758; Vienna aged 71	Ascended as a minor. After her death the county was inherited by the Kaunitz family.
Rietberg inherited by the Kaunitz family
George Albert	13 June 1690; Aurich; Son of Christian Everhard and Eberhadine Sophie of Oettingen-Oettingen	30 June 1708 – 12 June 1734	Principality of East Frisia	Christine Louise of Nassau-Idstein; 24 September 1709; Idstein five children Sophie Caroline of Brandenburg-Kulmbach; 8 December 1723; Berum no children	12 June 1734; Sandhorst Castle aged 43	
Charles Edzard	18 June 1716; Aurich; Son of George Albert and Christine Louise of Nassau-Idstein	12 June 1734 – 25 May 1744	Principality of East Frisia	Sophie Wilhelmine of Brandenburg-Bayreuth; 25 June 1734 one child	25 May 1744; Aurich aged 27	Last Prince of East Frisia of the House of Cirksena. He died without issue. After his death, the state was conquered by King Frederick II of Prussia.
East Frisia annexed to Prussia

== See also ==
- List of countesses of East Frisia

== Literature ==
- Tielke, Dr. Martin (Hrsg.): Biographisches Lexikon für East Frisia, Bd. 1 ISBN 3-925365-75-3 (1993), Bd. 2 ISBN 3-932206-00-2 (1997), Bd. 3 ISBN 3-932206-22-3 (2001) Ostfries. Landschaftliche Verl.- u. Vertriebsges. Aurich
- Martin Jhering: Hofleben in East Frisia. Die Fürstenresidenz Aurich im Jahre 1728, Hannover 2005
- Heinrich Reimers: East Frisia bis zum Aussterben seines Fürstenhauses, Bremen 1925
- Ernst Esselborn: Das Geschlecht Cirksena, Berlin 1945
- F. Wachter: Das Erbe der Cirksena. Ein Stück ostfriesischer Geschichte und des Kampfes um die Vorherrschaft in Norddeutschland., Aurich 1921
