= Count Ferdinand Edzard of East Frisia =

- Born: 12 July 1636; Aurich
- Died: 1 January 1668 (aged 31); Norden
- Noble family: Cirksena
- Spouses: Anna Dorothea of Criechingen and Püttingen
- Father: Ulrich II, Count of East Frisia
- Mother: Juliana of Hesse-Darmstadt

Count Ferdinand Edzard of East Frisia (12 July 1636, Aurich – 1 January 1668, Norden) was known as the Count of Norden.

== Life ==
Ferdinand Edzard was a member of the Cirksena ruling house of East Frisia. He was the youngest son of Count Ulrich II of East Frisia and Landgravine Juliana of Hesse-Darmstadt. From the age of 14, he attended the academies of Breda and Tübingen. As part of his training, he undertook extensive travels to France, Switzerland, Italy and England. In 1658, he returned to the court of his brother Prince Enno Louis at Aurich. After Enno Louis's sudden death in March 1660, Ferdinand Edzard demanded that power be shared between himself and his brother George Christian. He could not prevail. His request to have his share of the inheritance paid out, did not succeed either. On 18 January 1661 the brothers came to an agreement. Ferdinand Edzard dropped his request for a share of power in return for an annual sum of money and an apanage consisting the town of Norden. Ferdinand Edzard took up residence in Norden with a small court, and was henceforth known as the "Count of Norden".

The sudden death of George Christian beginning in June 1665 revived the question of government power. Because George Christian's widow Christine Charlotte of Württemberg was pregnant, Ferdinand Edzard took up the interim government until the birth of the future prince Christian Everhard. Ferdinand Edzard and Christine Charlotte then jointly took responsibility for the regency and guardianship of the newborn Prince.

== Marriage and children ==
On 22 July 1665 he married Anna Dorothea of Criechingen and Püttingen, daughter of count Albrecht Ludwig of Criechingen, with whom he had two sons:

- Edzard Eberhard William (* 28 June 1666, † 25 June 1707) ⚭ 1701 (morg.) Sophia Maria Föltin
- Frederick Ulrich (* 31 December 1667, † 13 March 1710), Dutch Lieutenant General ⚭ 1709 Marie Charlotte of East Frisia (* 10 April 1689; † 9 December 1761)

== References and sources ==
- Wiarda, Tieleman Dothias: Ostfriesische Geschichte, vol. 5, Aurich, 1795
- Esselborn, Ernst: Das Geschlecht Cirksena, die Häuptlinge, Grafen und Fürsten von Ostfriesland, Berlin-Pankow, 1945
