= Juliane Louise of East Frisia =

Louise Juliane of East Frisia
- Born: 16 November 1657; Aurich
- Died: 30 October 1715 (aged 57); Hamburg
- Noble family: Cirksena
- Spouse: Joachim Morgenweck
- Father: Enno Louis, Prince of East Frisia
- Mother: Justine Sophie of Barby

Princess Louise Juliane of East Frisia (16 November 1657 in Aurich – 30 October 1715 in Hamburg) was the eldest daughter of Prince Enno Louis of East Frisia and his second wife Justine Sophie of Barby.

After her father's death in 1660, she lived with her mother and her sister Sophia Wilhelmina at Berum Castle near Aurich. There were persistent inheritance disputes with their uncle George Christian and, after his death, with his widow, Christine Charlotte of Württemberg, who ruled East Frisia as regent for her underage son. The dispute was settled with a compromise in 1695. According to tradition, Louise Juliane received a sum of 59000thaler, which was paid two years later.

After Juliana Louise's mother died in 1677, she was penniless and moved in with her guardian Rudolph Augustus in Wolfenbüttel. After Rudolph Augustus died in 1686, she moved in with her relative John Adolphus in Plön. When she had received the 59000thaler in 1697, she became financially independent. In 1698, she moved to Hamburg, where she lived in a house at the Jungfernstieg. She also owned a country house at Ottensen. In 1700, she married the Reverend Joachim Morgenweck, a preacher at the orphanage of the Church of Mary Magdalene. The marriage took place secretly, because a relationship between a noblewoman and a pastor was generally regarded as scandalous in 1700. They lived apart and did not cause a stir.

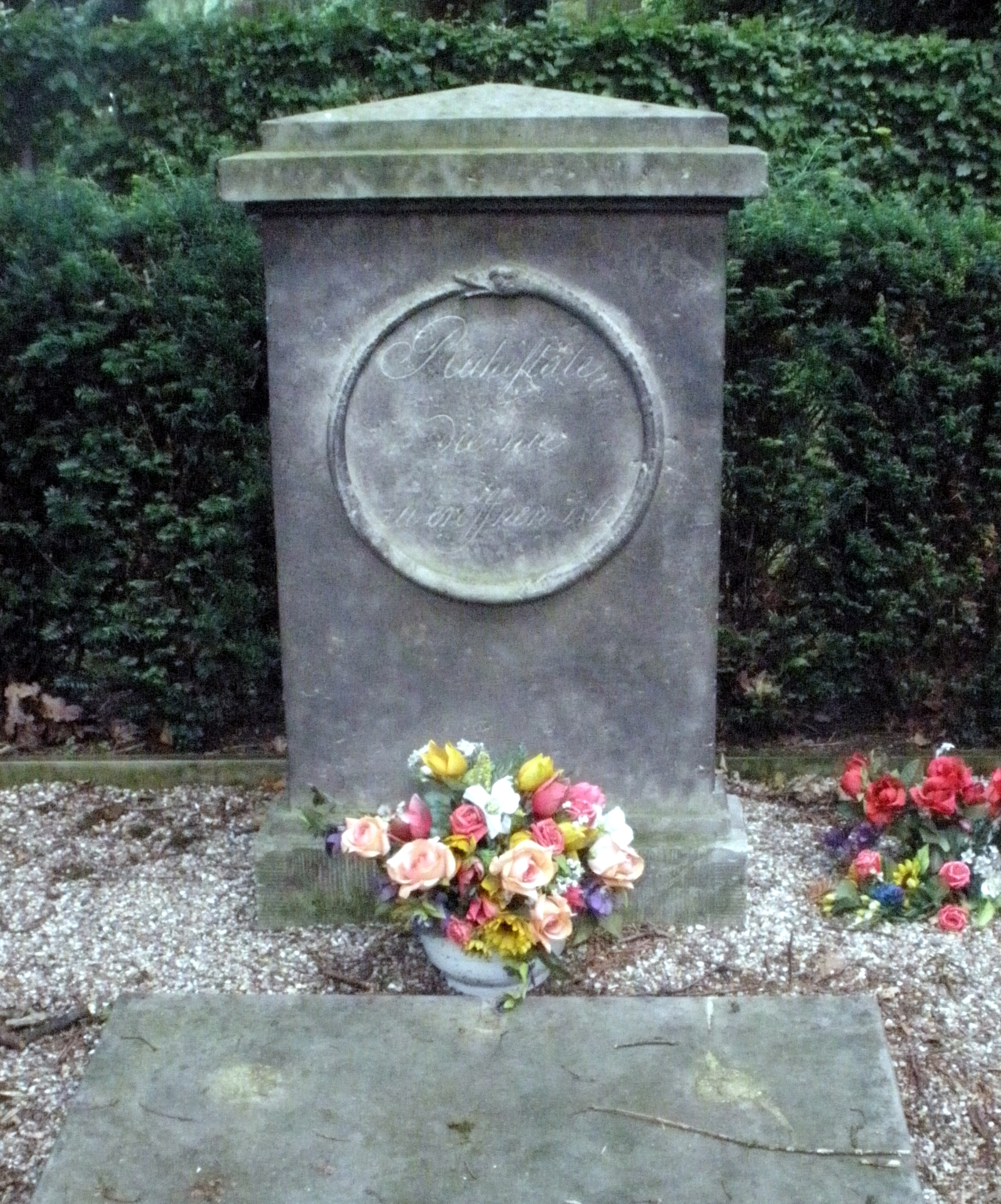
Grave of Princess Juliana Louise of East Frisia at the Ohlsdorf Cemetery

Juliana Louise died in October 1715 probably of the plague (disease). She bequeathed a sum of 3000 marks to Mary Magdalene Church, which should be used for the maintenance of her grave. She bequeathed to Morgenweck the right to live in the house at Ottensen for the rest of his life. A cousin challenged the will, holding up the payment of the 3000 marks. The graveyard did not release the grave until it had been paid for. Her tombstone stood for 18 months in the hallway of the apartment on Jungfernstieg, until she could finally be buried in March 1717.

The Church of Mary Magdalene was demolished in 1807. Juliana Louise's tomb was moved to one the cemeteries outside Dammtor and she was reburied there. When this cemetery was closed, she was reburied at the Ohlsdorf Cemetery and her tomb was again moved. It is one of the oldest tombstones on the new cemetery. It was renovated in 2010. Originally, her grave had an inscription This grave is not to be opened as long as the wind blows and the cokc crows. Today, the inscription reads This grave is never to be opened.
