= Anna Maria of Ostfriesland =

German noblewoman

Anna Maria of East Frisia
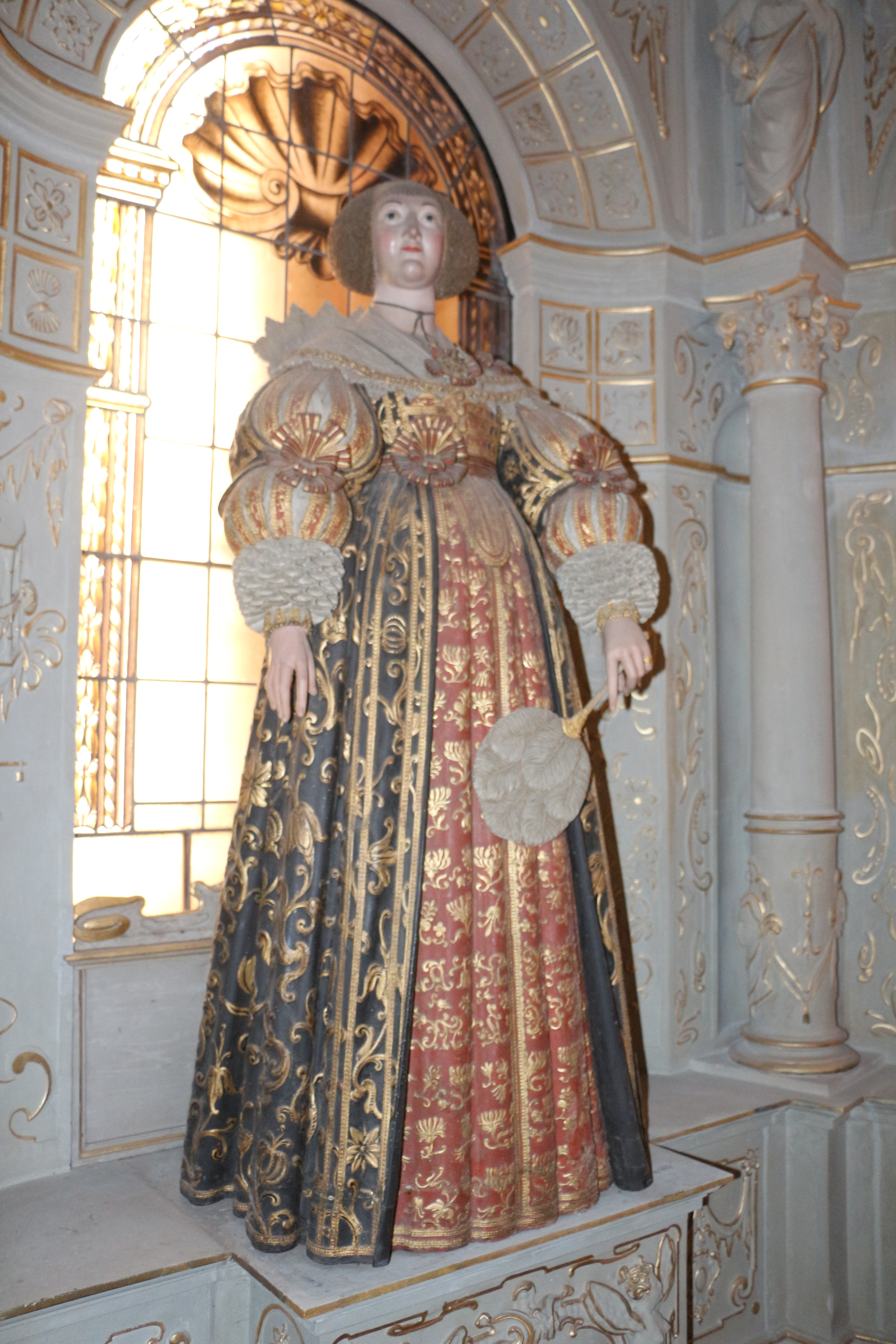
- Born: 23 June 1601
- Died: 15 February 1634 (aged 32)
- Noble family: Cirksena
- Spouse: Adolf Frederick I, Duke of Mecklenburg-Schwerin (m. 1622)
- Issue: Christian Louis I; Anna Maria
- Father: Enno III, Count of East Frisia
- Mother: Anna of Holstein-Gottorp

Anna Maria of Ostfriesland (23 June 1601 – 15 February 1634) was a German noblewoman.

She was a daughter of Count Enno III of East Frisia and Anna of Holstein-Gottorp. Her paternal grandmother was Katharina of Sweden, a daughter of Gustav I of Sweden and his second wife Margareta Leijonhufvud.

On 4 September 1622 she married her first cousin Adolf Frederick I, Duke of Mecklenburg-Schwerin (1588–1658). They had the following children:

1. Christian Louis I, Duke of Mecklenburg-Schwerin (11 December 1623 – 21 June 1692)
2. Sophia Agnes of Mecklenburg-Schwerin (11 January 1625 – 26 December 1694)
3. Karl, Duke of Mecklenburg-Mirow (8 March 1626 – 20 August 1670)
4. Anna Maria of Mecklenburg-Schwerin (1 July 1627 – 11 December 1669), married Augustus, Duke of Saxe-Weissenfels (ancestors of George III of the United Kingdom).
5. Johann Georg of Mecklenburg-Schwerin (5 May 1629 – 9 July 1675)
6. Hedwig of Mecklenburg-Schwerin (11 August 1630 – 17 May 1631)
7. Gustav Rudolf of Mecklenburg-Schwerin (26 February 1632 – 14 May 1670)
8. Juliane of Mecklenburg-Schwerin (8 November 1633 – 3 February 1634)

== Ancestry ==
Ancestors of Anna Maria of Ostfriesland

8. Enno II, Count of East Frisia
4. Edzard II, Count of East Frisia
9. Anna of Oldenburg
2. Enno III, Count of East Frisia
10. Gustav I of Sweden
5. Katarina Vasa
11. Margaret Leijonhufvud
1. Anna Maria of Ostfriesland
12. Frederick I, King of Denmark
6. Adolf, Duke of Holstein-Gottorp
13. Sophie of Pomerania
3. Anna of Holstein-Gottorp
14. Philip I, Landgrave of Hesse
7. Christine of Hesse
15. Christine of Saxony
