= Juliana of Hesse-Darmstadt =

Countess of East Frisia

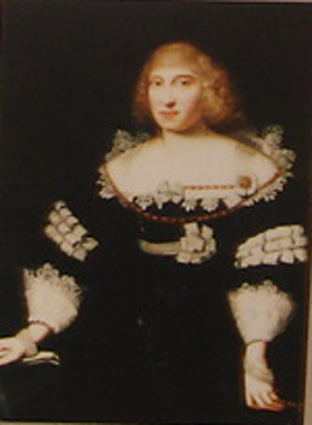
- Juliana of Hesse-Darmstadt

Countess consort of East Frisia
- Reign: 5 March 1631 – 1 November 1648
- Predecessor: Anna of Holstein-Gottorp
- Successor: Juliana Sophia of Barby-Mühlingen

Countess of East Frisia (as regent); Lady of Esens, Stedesdorf and Wittmund (as regent)
- Reign: 1 November 1648 - 1651
- Predecessor: Ulrich II
- Successor: Enno Louis
- Born: 14 April 1606; Darmstadt
- Died: 15 January 1659 (aged 52); Osterode am Harz
- Spouse: Ulrich II
- Issue: Enno Louis, Prince of East Frisia; George Christian, Prince of East Frisia; Count Ferdinand Edzard of East Frisia
- House: Hesse-Darmstadt
- Father: Louis V, Landgrave of Hesse-Darmstadt
- Mother: Magdalene of Brandenburg

Juliana of Hesse-Darmstadt (14 April 1606 in Darmstadt – 15 January 1659 in Osterode am Harz) was the wife of Count Ulrich II of East Frisia and was regent for her minor son Enno Louis from 1648 to 1651. Her parents were Landgrave Louis V of Hesse-Darmstadt and Magdalene of Brandenburg, daughter of Elector John George von Brandenburg.

Juliana arrived in East Frisia on 5 March 1631 and married count Ulrich II on the same day. She and her husband had three sons: Enno Louis, George Christian and Edzard Ferdinand. Even during the turmoil of the Thirty Years' War Ulrich managed to build a Lustschloss for his wife at Sandhorst. It was completed in 1648 even though East Frisia had to endure great hardship during the war, due to various foreign occupiers.

After her husband's death, she was appointed guardian of her minor sons, and regent of the county. However, she sent her cumbersome sons abroad and lived a life of decadence, leaving the management of the badly damaged county in the hands of her favourites, who managed the county poorly. This led to increasing problems with the East Frisian Estates.

Most notable among these favourites were Secret Councillor Johann von Marenholz and his wife Elisabeth von Ungnad zu Sonneck, who a been a lady-in-waiting for Juliana. Juliana was alleged to have had an affair with Marenholz, which later proved his undoing. He was executed in Wittmund on 21 July 1651, after a show trial. In the meantime, Juliana had moved the court from Aurich to Sandhorst to be able to indulge in the sweet life undisturbedly. Many East Frisians held that under Marenholz and his wife, the problems of the county had gotten out of hand and urged the young Count Enno Louis to return to his County.

Emperor Ferdinand III declared Enno Louis to be an adult in 1651 and in May that year Enno Louis removed his mother from government. She was sent to her Wittum at Berum Castle. In 1654 she bought the farm Westerhof in Osterode am Harz, where she died on 15 January 1659.

== Ancestors ==
Ancestors of Juliana of Hesse-Darmstadt

16. William II, Landgrave of Hesse
8. Philip I, Landgrave of Hesse
17. Anna of Mecklenburg-Schwerin
4. George I, Landgrave of Hesse-Darmstadt
18. George, Duke of Saxony
9. Christine of Saxony
19. Barbara Jagiellon
2. Louis V, Landgrave of Hesse-Darmstadt
20. Simon V, Count of Lippe
10. Bernhard VIII, Count of Lippe
21. Magdalena of Mansfeld
5. Magdalene of Lippe
22. Philip III, Count of Waldeck-Eisenberg
11. Catherine of Waldeck-Eisenberg
23. Anna of Cleves
1. Juliana of Hesse-Darmstadt
24. Joachim I Nestor, Elector of Brandenburg
12. Joachim II Hector, Elector of Brandenburg
25. Elizabeth of Denmark
6. John George, Elector of Brandenburg
26. George, Duke of Saxony(=18)
13. Magdalena of Saxony
27. Barbara Jagiellon (=19)
3. Magdalene of Brandenburg
28. John V, Prince of Anhalt-Zerbst
14. Joachim Ernest, Prince of Anhalt
29. Margarete of Brandenburg
7. Elisabeth of Anhalt-Zerbst
30. Wolfgang I, Count of Barby-Mühlingen
15. Agnes of Barby-Mühlingen
31. Agnes of Mansfeld

== References and sources ==
- Tielke, Martin (ed.): Biographisches Lexikon für Ostfriesland, Ostfriesisches Landschaftliche Verlag- u. Vertriebsgeschäft, Aurich, vol. 1 ISBN 3-925365-75-3 (1993), vol. 2 ISBN 3-932206-00-2 (1997), vol. 3 ISBN 3-932206-22-3 (2001)
- Franz Kurowski: Das Volk am Meer – Die dramatische Geschichte der Friesen, Türmer-Verlag 1984, ISBN 3-87829-082-9.
- Mathilde Raven: Elisabeth von Ungnad – Biographischer Roman aus der Geschichte Oldenburg – Ostfrieslands Lohse-Eissing Verlag, ISBN 3-920602-23-4.

Juliana of Hesse-Darmstadt Cirksena Born: 14 April 1606 Died: 15 January 1659
| Preceded by Ulrich II | Regent of the County of East Frisia; 1648–1651 | Succeeded by Enno Louis |
| Vacant Title last held by Anna of Holstein-Gottorp | Countess consort of East Frisia; 1631–1648 | Vacant Title next held by Juliana Sophia of Barby-Mühlingen |
