= Enno Louis, Prince of East Frisia =

Enno Louis
- Prince/Count of East Frisia; Lord of Esens, Stedesdorf and Wittmund
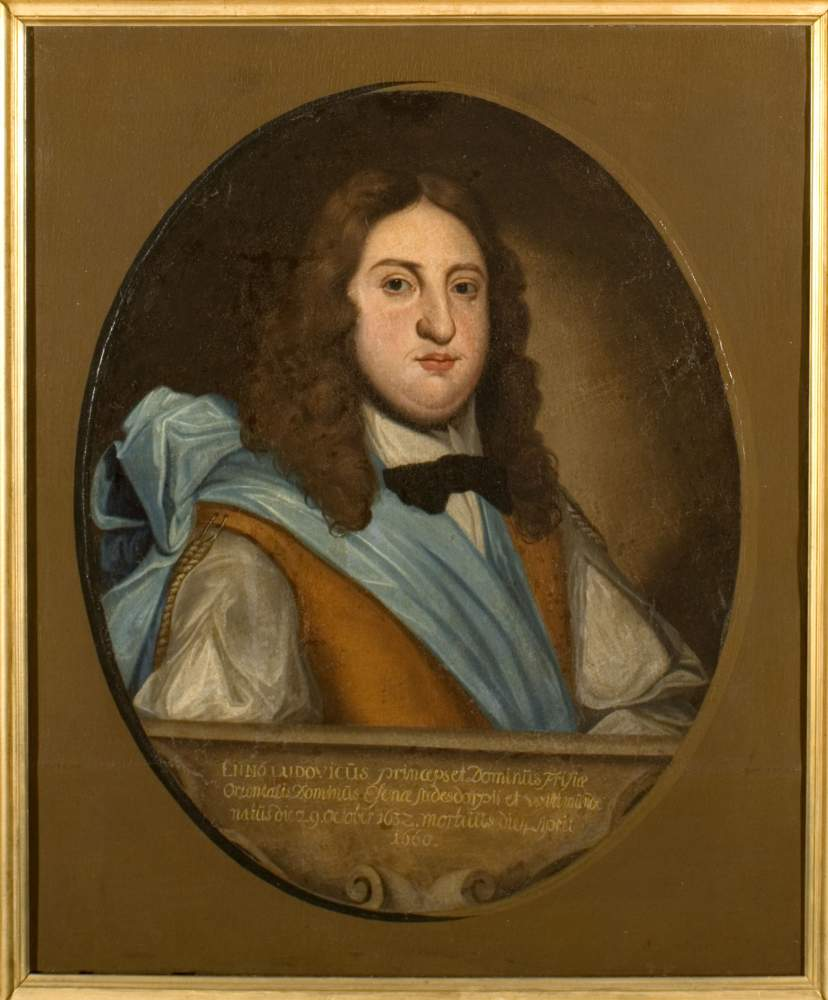
- Enno Louis, Prince/Count of East Frisia

Prince/Count of East Frisia; Lord of Esens, Stedesdorf and Wittmund
- Reign: 1651 – 4 April 1660
- Predecessor: Juliana of Hesse-Darmstadt (as regent)
- Successor: Georg Christian
- Born: 29 October 1632; Aurich
- Died: 4 April 1660 (aged 27); Aurich
- Spouse: Juliana Sophia of Barby-Mühlingen
- House: Cirksena
- Father: Ulrich II
- Mother: Juliana of Hesse-Darmstadt
- Religion: Lutheranism

Enno Louis of East Frisia, was count of East Frisia and after 1654 Fürst (Prince) of East Frisia, (29 October 1632 – Aurich, 4 April 1660) and the son of Ulrich II and Juliana of Hesse-Darmstadt.

== Life ==
Enno Louis grew up in the Netherlands, France and Switzerland and had an expensive education. At the age of 19 he was appointed Reichshofrat on the court of emperor Ferdinand III. With this the emperor recognised his maturity and governing skills. So he could push aside his mother Juliana of Hesse-Darmstadt and her advisers from the government. In 1651 he became count of East Frisia. Quickly after this he tried and executed the favourite and lover of his mother, the geheimrat Johann von Marenholz. He was executed in Wittmund on July 21, 1651.

He attempted to become Reichsfürst (Prince) and with the help of the East Frisian scholar Hermann Conring and 15,000 guiders he succeeded in this goal in 1654. Although only for himself and without a seat in the Reichstag. His brother George Christian who succeeded him managed to obtain the hereditary title. He was engaged with Henriette Catherine of Nassau but eventually married in 1656 with Juliana Sophia of Barby-Mühlingen. With her he had two daughters, Juliane Louise and Sophie Wilhelmine, who became the third wife of Christian Ulrich I, Duke of Württemberg-Oels. He died in 1660 after a hunting accident. Because he had only daughters he was succeeded by his brother.

== Ancestors ==
Ancestors of Enno Louis, Prince of East Frisia

16. Enno II of East Frisia
8. Edzard of East Frisia
17. Anna of Oldenburg
4. Enno III, Count of East Frisia
18. Gustav I of Sweden
9. Katarina Vasa
19. Margaret Leijonhufvud
2. Ulrich II, Count of East Frisia
20. Frederick I of Denmark
10. Adolf of Holstein-Gottorp
21. Sophie of Pomerania
5. Anna of Holstein-Gottorp
22. Philip I of Hesse
11. Christine of Hesse
23. Christine of Saxony
1. Enno Louis, Prince of East Frisia
24. Philip I of Hesse (= 22)
12. George I, Landgrave of Hesse-Darmstadt
25. Christine of Saxony (= 23)
6. Louis V, Landgrave of Hesse-Darmstadt
26. Bernhard VIII, Count of Lippe
13. Magdalene of Lippe
27. Catherine of Waldeck-Eisenberg
3. Juliana of Hesse-Darmstadt
28. Joachim II Hector, Elector of Brandenburg
14. John George, Elector of Brandenburg
29. Magdalena of Saxony
7. Magdalene of Brandenburg
30. Joachim Ernest, Prince of Anhalt
15. Elisabeth of Anhalt-Zerbst
31. Agnes of Barby

== Literature ==
- Tielke, Martin (ed.): Biographisches Lexikon für Ostfriesland, Bd. 1 ISBN 3-925365-75-3 (1993), Bd. 2 ISBN 3-932206-00-2 (1997), Bd. 3 ISBN 3-932206-22-3 (2001) Ostfries. Landschaftliche Verl.- u. Vertriebsges. Aurich
- Ernst Kaeber: Bilder aus dem Leben ostfries. Fürstlichkeiten des 17. Jahrhunderts. I. Die jüngeren Brüder des Fürsten Enno Ludwig. II. Aus dem Leben des Fürsten Christian Eberhard, Aurich, 1912
- Ernst Kaeber: Die Jugendzeit Fürst Enno Ludwigs von Ostfriesland, Aurich, 1911

Enno Louis, Prince of East Frisia Cirksena Born: 29 October 1632 Died: 4 April 1660
Preceded by Juliana as Regent	Count of East Frisia; 1651–1660	Succeeded by George Christian as Prince of East Frisia
