= Ungnad =

Ungnad is a surname. Notable people with the surname include:

- David Ungnad von Sonnegg (1535–1600), Holy Roman Ambassador
- Elisabeth von Ungnad (1614–1683), German court official
- Hans von Ungnad (1493–1564), Habsburg nobleman
- Krsto Ungnad, Croatian ban
