= List of East Frisian people =

This is a list of East Frisian people who are important to the region of East Frisia and its history in that they have played a key role in the region or are otherwise renowned and closely linked to East Frisia.

== Other East Frisian lists ==
- List of counts of East Frisia
- List of countesses of East Frisia

== Art and culture ==
- Ludolf Bakhuizen, artist
- Eggerik Beninga, Frisian chronicler
- Philipp Heinrich Erlebach, composer
- Rudolf Eucken, German Nobel prize winner for literature, 1908
- Martin Faber, architect, artist and cartographer
- Recha Freier, Swiss-born playwright, holder of the Israeli State Prize
- Hans-Joachim Hespos, composer
- the family of Ub Iwerks
- Hermann Lübbe, philosopher
- Henri Nannen, publisher
- Uwe Rosenberg, game inventor

== Film, TV and radio ==
- Heiko Engelkes, journalist, ARD correspondent in Paris, author
- Okka Gundel, presenter on Sportschau and tagesschau24
- Eva Herman, presenter, newscaster and playwright
- Wolfgang Petersen, Hollywood director of inter alia Das Boot and Troy
- Helma Sanders-Brahms, director

== History ==
- Edzard the Great, East Frisian count
- Klaus Störtebeker, pirate during the time of the Hanseatic League
- Balthasar von Esens, pirate
- Max Windmüller, German-Jewish resistance fighter against Nazism
- Dodo zu Innhausen und Knyphausen, military commander during the Thirty Years' War

== Musicians and comedians ==
- Carl Carlton (German musician), rock musician
- Karl Dall, comedian, actor, entertainer
- H.P. Baxxter, real name: Hans-Peter Geerdes, front man of the techno band Scooter
- Al Shean, US American-German comedian
- Theodore Thomas, born Theodor Thomas, musician, composer, founder of the Chicago Symphony Orchestra
- Otto Waalkes, comedian, actor

== Politics ==
- Gesine Agena, politician and speaker for the Grüne Jugend
- Gitta Connemann, MdB
- Garrelt Duin, former leader of the SPD in Lower Saxony, MdB

== Sport ==
- Christian Alder, footballer
- Dieter Eilts, footballer
- Karsten Fischer, footballer
- Bernd Flessner, windsurfer (15-time German champion)
- Heidi Hartmann, world boxing champion
- Marco Kutscher, showjumper (European and Olympic bronze medallist)
- Silvia Rieger, track and field athlete (hurdles)
- Ferydoon Zandi, footballer

== Theology ==
- Menso Alting
- David Fabricius, theologian, important amateur astronomer and cartographer
- Eduard Norden, philologist and religious historian

== Science ==
- Eggerik Beninga, chronicler
- Hermann Conring, legal scholar
- Ubbo Emmius, pastor, historian and founder of the University of Groningen
- Rudolf Eucken, philosopher
- Johannes Fabricius, one of the discoverers of sunspots
- Wilhelm von Freeden, German mathematician, scientist and oceanographer, founder of the North German Hydrographic Office in Hamburg
- Rudolf von Jhering, German lawyer
- Hermann Lübbe, philosopher
- Hans-Wilhelm Müller-Wohlfahrt, sports doctor and doctor to the Germany National Football Team and FC Bayern Munich
- Johann Christian Reil, doctor and professor

== Other people ==
- Jan van Koningsveld, world champion in mental arithmetic
- Minnie Schönberg, mother of the Marx Brothers, who came from Dornum
- Tamme Hanken, vet and TV presenter

== Literature ==
- Martin Tielke (ed.): Biographisches Lexikon für Ostfriesland. Ostfriesische Landschaft, Aurich, 1993 (in Fula), 5 volumes, Vol. 4, 2007.
