= Rudolf Christian, Count of East Frisia =

Rudolf Christian
- Count of East Frisia; Lord of Esens, Stedesdorf and Wittmund
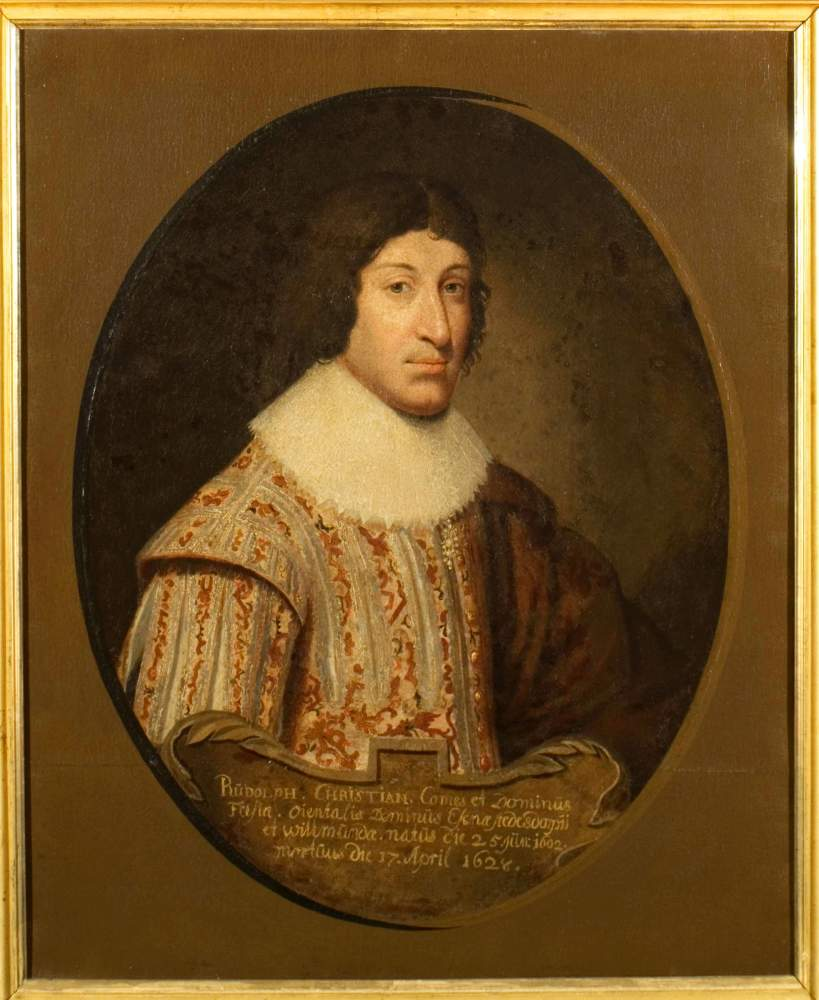
- Rudolf Christian, Count of East Frisia

Count of East Frisia; Lord of Esens, Stedesdorf and Wittmund
- Reign: 19 August 1625 - 17 April 1628
- Predecessor: Enno III
- Successor: Ulrich II
- Born: 2 June 1602; Hage
- Died: 17 April 1628 (aged 25); Hage
- House: Cirksena
- Father: Enno III, Count of East Frisia
- Mother: Anna of Holstein-Gottorp
- Religion: Lutheranism

Rudolf Christian of Ostfriesland, Count of East Frisia, was count of East Frisia, (Hage, 2 June 1602 – Hage, 17 April 1628) and the second son of Enno III, Count of East Frisia and Anna of Holstein-Gottorp. During his reign, foreign troops participating in the Thirty Years' War began retreating into and quartering in East Frisia. Also during his reign, fen exploitation in East Frisia begins.

He reached a settlement with the East Frisian Estates, who them paid him homage, ultimately even the city of Emden did so. Under his leadership, the Lordships of Esens, Stedesdorf and Wittmund were finally incorporated in the county of East Frisia. This is visible in the county's coat of arms, which was introduced under his rule in 1625 and remained in use until the county was annexed by Prussia in 1744.

At the age of just 26, he got embroiled in a fight with a lieutenant of the army of general Matthias Gallas, which was quartered in Berum Castle. He was stabbed in the left eye, and died of his wound.

Since Rudolf Christian had no legitimate children, he was succeeded as Count of East Frisia by his brother Ulrich II.

== Children ==
Rudolf Christian I of East Frisia had one illegitimate son, Johann Friedrich Freese, with his mistress Katharina Borgelken:

- Johann Friedrich Freese, married with Armgard von Folkenstein, daughter of Johann von Folkenstein.

== Ancestors ==
Ancestors of Rudolf Christian, Count of East Frisia

16. Edzard I, Count of East Frisia
8. Enno II, Count of East Frisia
17. Elisabeth of Rietberg
4. Edzard II, Count of East Frisia
18. John V, Count of Oldenburg
9. Anna of Oldenburg
19. Anna of Anhalt-Zerbst
2. Enno III, Count of East Frisia
20. Erik Johansson Vasa
10. Gustav I of Sweden
21. Cecilia Månsdotter
5. Catherine of Sweden
22. Erik Abrahamsson Leijonhufvud
11. Margaret Leijonhufvud
23. Ebba Eriksdotter Vasa
1. Rudolf Christian, Count of East Frisia
24. Christian I of Denmark
12. Frederick I of Denmark
25. Dorothea of Brandenburg
6. Adolf, Duke of Holstein-Gottorp
26. Bogislaw X, Duke of Pomerania
13. Sophie of Pomerania
27. Anna Jagiellon
3. Anna of Holstein-Gottorp
28. William II, Landgrave of Hesse
14. Philip I, Landgrave of Hesse
29. Anna of Mecklenburg-Schwerin
7. Christine of Hesse
30. George, Duke of Saxony
15. Christine of Saxony
31. Barbara Jagiellon

Rudolf Christian, Count of East Frisia Cirksena Born: 2 June 1602 Died: 17 April 1628
Preceded by Enno III	Count of East Frisia; 1625–1628	Succeeded by Ulrich II
