= Charles Edzard, Prince of East Frisia =

Charles Edzard
- Prince of East Frisia; Lord of Esens, Stedesdorf and Wittmund
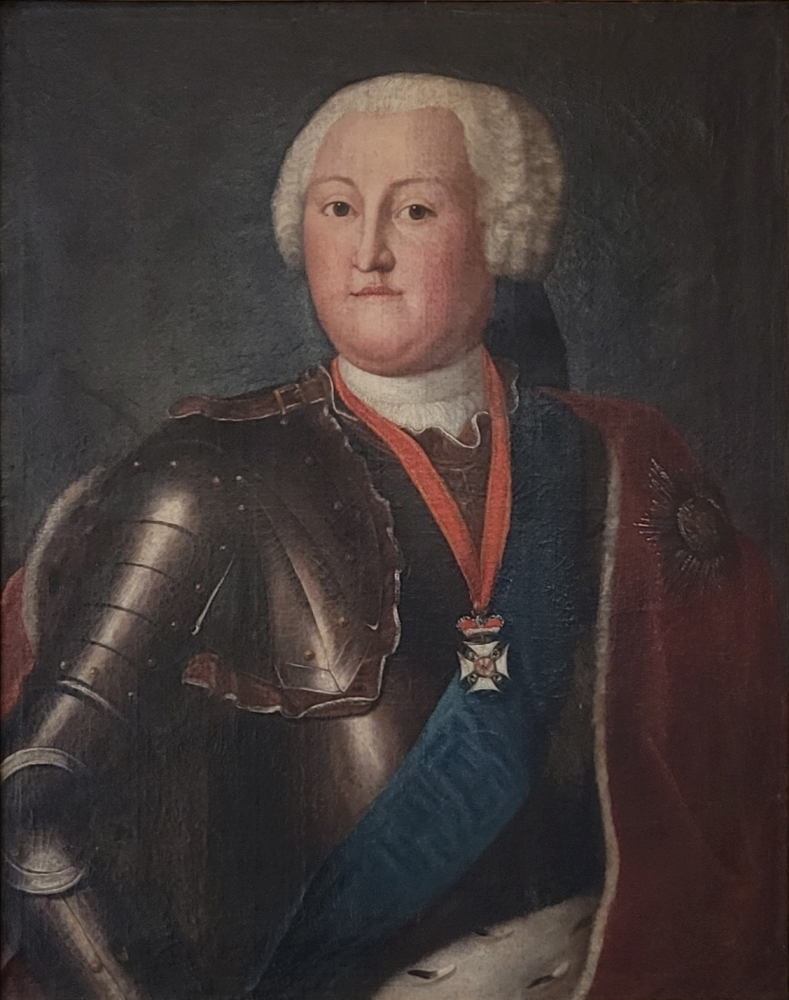
- Charles Edzard, Prince of East Frisia

Prince of East Frisia
- Reign: 11 June 1734 - 25 May 1744
- Predecessor: George Albert
- Successor: Frederick II (Personal union with Prussia)

Lord of Esens, Stedesdorf and Wittmund
- Reign: 11 June 1734 - 25 May 1744
- Predecessor: George Albert
- Successor: abolished
- Born: 18 June 1716; Aurich
- Died: 25 May 1744 (aged 27); Aurich
- Spouse: Sophie Wilhelmine of Brandenburg-Kulmbach-Bayreuth
- House: Cirksena
- Father: George Albert, Prince of East Frisia
- Mother: Countess Christine Louise of Nassau-Idstein
- Religion: Lutheranism

Charles Edzard (18 June 1716 in Aurich – 25 May 1744 in Aurich) was the last prince of East Frisia. He ruled from 12 June 1734 until his death.

== Early life ==
He was born at the castle in Aurich, as the fourth child of the reigning prince George Albert and his wife, Princess Christine Louise of Nassau-Idstein (1691–1723).

== Biography ==
Charles Edzard received a harsh, authoritarian education from his father George Albert, in an atmosphere of bigotry and ascetic piety, which did not leave the child any freedom or opportunities for self-development. The fact that all of his siblings died during their first year of life, had caused the father to panic and fear of the extinction of the male line of the Cirksena. He was meticulously planning the daily schedule. Every week, every day, every hour has been prescribed by a precise timetable to be followed to the prince. Even the recovery phase, the hours to ride and to walk were scheduled exactly.

Charles Edzard was taught Roman law, medieval history and French. He never received a military training, even though he was appointed colonel and chief of the small princely militia by his father at the age of 10. Due to his father's early death, no time remained for studying. His travels were limited on the court in Aurich, the hunting lodge in Sandhorst and the princely Berum Castle. He never even visited Emden, the largest city of his territory, though he once looked at it from a distance.

== Reigning prince ==
The Charles Edzards's father had been ill for a long period. He had a stroke before Charles Edzards's 18th birthday. A wedding was hastily arranged for the man who was never allowed to decide anything in his life. This time it was probably his step-mother who decided for him. She selected Princess Sophie Wilhelmine of Brandenburg-Kulmbach-Bayreuth (1714–1749), the daughter of her oldest brother George Frederick Charles, Margrave of Brandenburg-Bayreuth, and arranged the betrothal between Charles Edzards and his cousin Sophie Wilhelmine, who was just sixteen years old. They married on 25 May 1734 at Berum Castle.

Three weeks later, on 12 June 1734, the father died, and Charles Edzard was ruler of East Frisia, without being really prepared for this task. After years of conflicts of recent years between the Princely House and the Estates, the Prince had hardly any prestige left. The city of Emden and other rebellious Estates refused to pay him homage. Whether Charles Edzard contributed at all to the administration of his country, is at least doubtful. It is likely that "his" decisions were in fact made by other people.

Charles Edzard died unexpectedly on 25 May 1744, just 28 years old and four days after his wife, Princess Sophia Wilhelmina, suffered a miscarriage in her second pregnancy (their only living child was a daughter - Elisabeth Sophie Magdalena, born 5 December 1740, died 14 June 1742). He was the last sovereign Prince of East Frisia. The circumstances of his death, whether natural or not, can no longer be ascertained.

East Frisia now fell to Prussia. Following the Emden Convention already concluded on 14 March 1744 between the city of Emden and Frederick II of Prussia, the latter was allowed to march without resistance into East Frisia.

== References and sources ==
- Tielke, Martin (ed.): Biographisches Lexikon für Ostfriesland, Ostfriesisches Landschaftliche Verlag- u. Vertriebsgeschäft, Aurich, vol. 1 ISBN 3-925365-75-3 (1993), vol. 2 ISBN 3-932206-00-2 (1997), vol. 3 ISBN 3-932206-22-3 (2001)

Charles Edzard, Prince of East Frisia Cirksena Born: 18 June 1716 Died: 25 May 1744
Preceded by George Albert	Prince of East Frisia; 1734–1744	Succeeded by Frederick the Great as King in Prussia
