= Elisabeth von Ungnad =

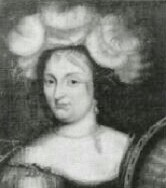
Portrait of Elisabeth Ungnad von Weissenwolf

Elisabeth Freiin von Ungnad-Sonnegg (1614–1683), was a German noblewoman and prominent court official within the Holy Roman Empire.

== Biography ==
Elisabeth was a member of the Austrian nobility settled in the Kingdom of Bohemia. She was elder daughter of Andreas von Ungnad, Freiherr zu Sonnegg (1579–1634) by his wife, Margarethe von Prag, Freiin von Windhag zu Engelstein (1585–1669).

She became the lady-in-waiting to Juliana of Hesse-Darmstadt. She married Freiherr Johann von Marenholtz, and the two spouses exerted great influence in Ostfriesland as the favorites of Juliane during her regency.

She had an extramarital affair with Anthony Günther, Count of Oldenburg. The affair resulted in birth of one son:

- Count Anton I von Aldenburg (1633–1680); married on 22 April 1659 to, firstly Countess Auguste Johanna of Sayn-Wittgenstein-Hohenstein (1638–1669), and had issue, secondly to Charlotte Amélie de La Trémoille (1652-1732), and had issue.

Their issue became Counts of Aldenburg, whose line died out with its last representative, Countess Charlotte Sophie of Aldenburg, married to William, Count Bentinck, Lord of Rhoon and Pendrecht.

Their descendants became Counts of Bentinck-Aldenburg, a mediatised house, former ruling family of the Holy Roman Empire. As such, the House of Bentinck-Aldenburg belonged to the high nobility with equal status of birth for marriage purposes to other European royal families.
