= Osterhusen =

- Village of Hinte
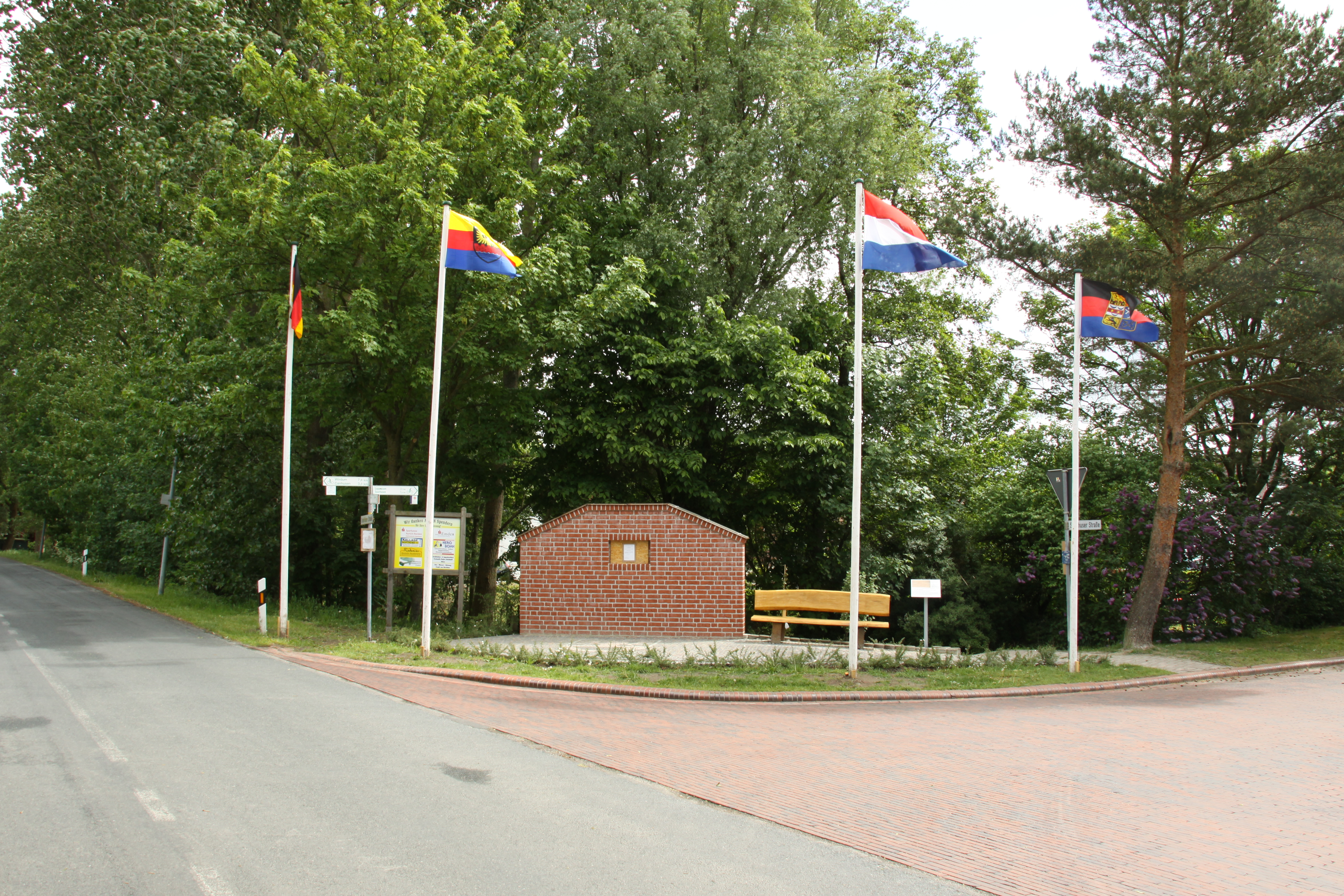
- Monument for the Accord of Osterhusen

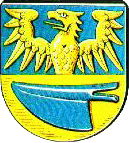
- Coat of arms
- Interactive map of Osterhusen
- Location within Germany Location within Lower Saxony
- Country: Germany
- State: Lower Saxony
- District: Aurich
- Municipality: Hinte
- Elevation: 3 m (9.8 ft)

Population
  - Metro: 500
- Time zone: UTC+01:00 (CET)
  - Summer (DST): UTC+02:00 (CEST)
- Postal codes: 26759
- Dialling codes: 04925

Osterhusen is a village in the region of East Frisia, in Lower Saxony, Germany. Administratively, it is an Ortsteil of the municipality of Hinte, of which it is located to the northeast. Westerhusen is to the west of Suurhusen and Loppersum.

The village dates back to the 10th century as Ostahusun. In 1611, the Accord of Osterhusen was concluded here in which Count Enno III of East Frisia made peace with his rebellious subjects under pressure from the States-General of the Dutch Republic.

== Notable people ==
- Adolph Occo (1447–1503), physician and humanist
