= Canhusen =

- Village of Hinte
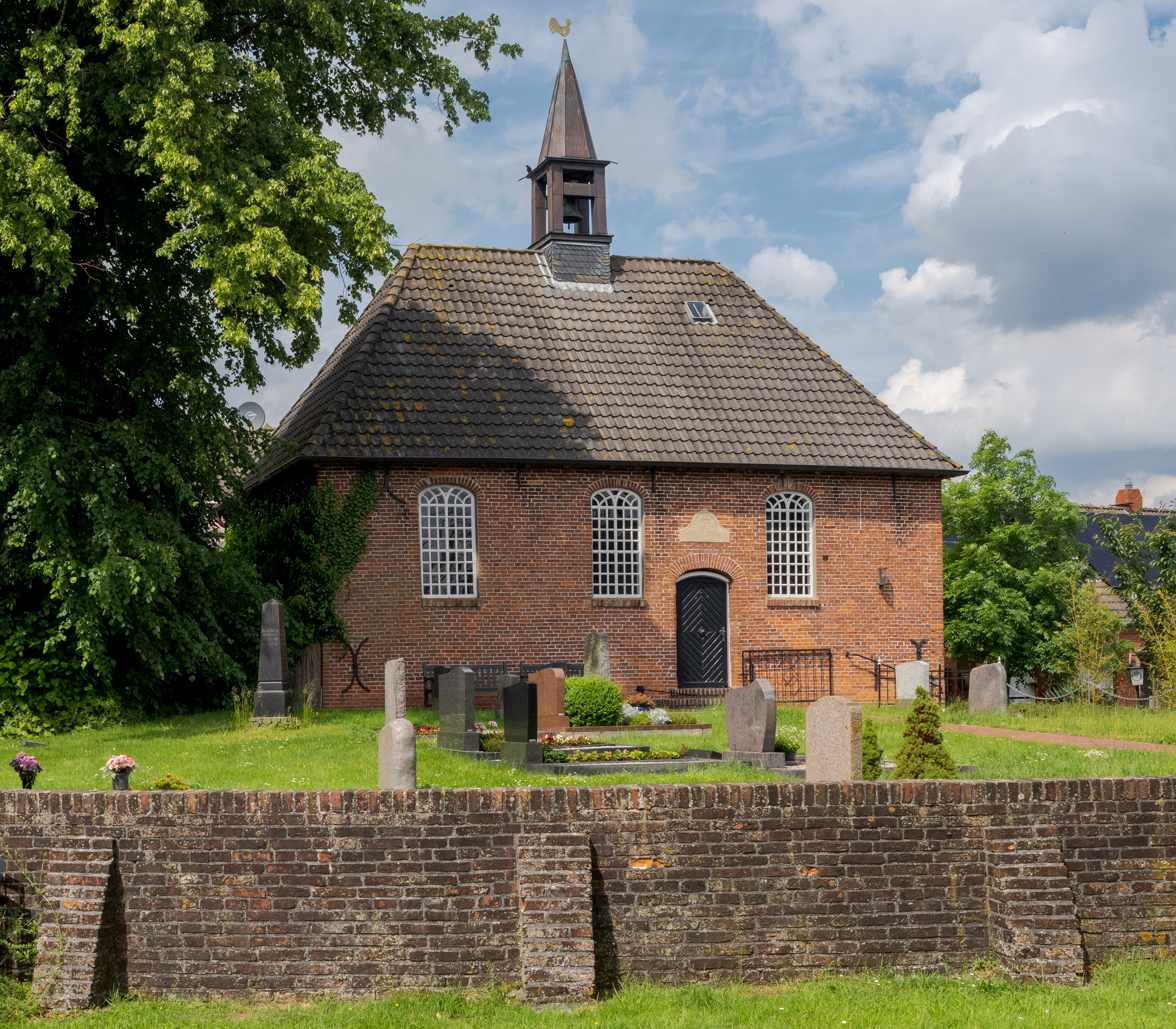
- Church of Canhusen

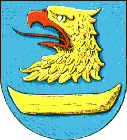
- Coat of arms
- Interactive map of Canhusen
- Location within Germany Location within Lower Saxony
- Country: Germany
- State: Lower Saxony
- District: Aurich
- Municipality: Hinte
- Elevation: 0 m (0 ft)

Population
  - Metro: 170
- Time zone: UTC+01:00 (CET)
  - Summer (DST): UTC+02:00 (CEST)
- Postal codes: 26759
- Dialling codes: 04925

Canhusen is a small village in the region of East Frisia, in Lower Saxony, Germany, between Loppersum and Wirdum. Administratively, it is an Ortsteil of the municipality of Hinte, of which it is located to the northeast. With 170 inhabitants, it is the smallest village in the municipality by population.

At the village, there is a borg from the chieftain Folkmar Allena. This chief ultimately lost his power to Ocko II tom Brok. The Church of Canhusen was built in 1789 and has a bell from the former Sielmönken Monastery.
