= George Christian, Prince of East Frisia =

George Christian
- Prince of East Frisia; Lord of Esens, Stedesdorf and Wittmund
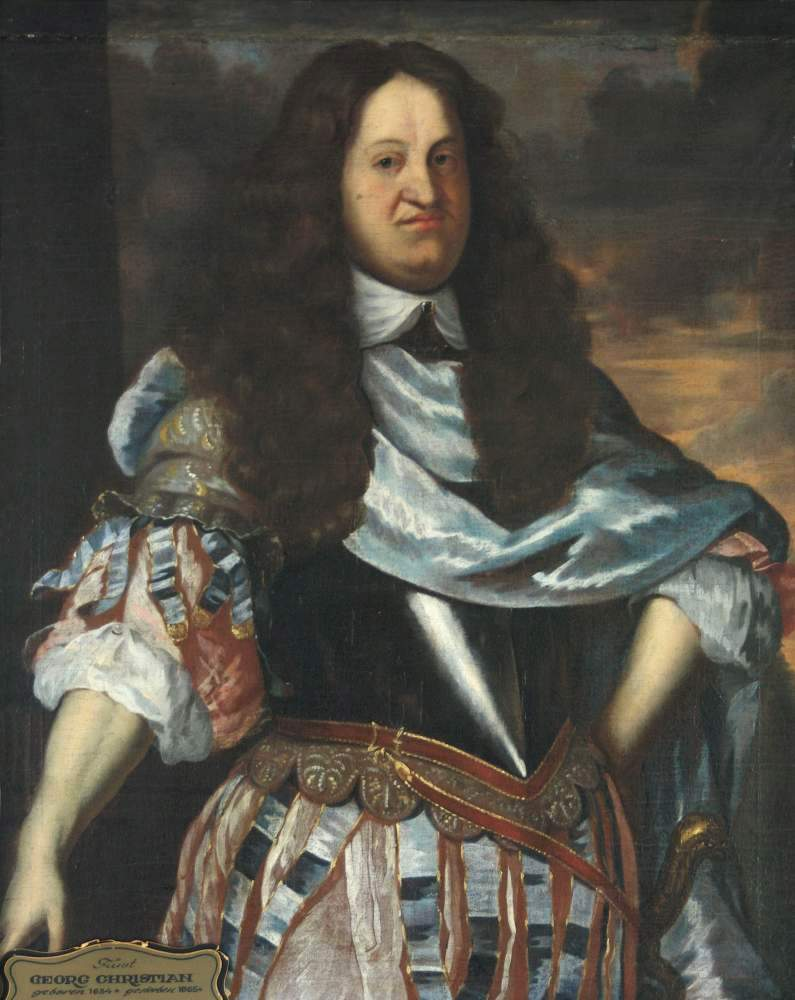
- George Christian, Prince of East Frisia

Prince of East Frisia; Lord of Esens, Stedesdorf and Wittmund
- Reign: 4 April 1660 - 6 June 1665
- Predecessor: Enno Louis
- Successor: Christine Charlotte of Württemberg (as regent)
- Born: 6 February 1634; Aurich
- Died: 6 June 1665 (aged 31); Aurich
- Spouse: Christine Charlotte of Württemberg
- Issue: Eberhardine Katharina; Juliane Charlotte; Christian Everhard
- House: Cirksena
- Father: Ulrich II of East Frisia
- Mother: Juliana of Hesse-Darmstadt
- Religion: Lutheranism

George Christian (6 February 1634, Aurich – 6 June 1665, Aurich) was a member of the Cirksena family and succeeded his brother Enno Louis as ruler of East Frisia. He ruled from 1660 to 1665. Under his reign, the Cirksena family acquired on 18 April 1662 the hereditary title of Imperial Prince.

== Early life ==
George Christian was born into the House of Cirksena, ruling family of the County of East Frisia, as the second son of Ulrich II, Count of East Frisia and his wife, Landgravine Juliana of Hesse-Darmstadt.

== Biography ==
George Christian grew up with his brother at the court in Aurich. After 1649, they received further education at the academies of Breda and Tübingen.

Immediately after his accession he was trying to establish his rule, which led to severe conflicts with the Estates. This soon reached the threshold of a civil war and could be settled only by Dutch mediation. After lengthy negotiations with the Estates on 19 June 1662 and 4 October 1663, a compromise was reached. The Netherlands became the guarantor power. In both treaties, the relationship between the prince and the Estates was regulated. The estates were given back their old privileges, in exchange for a substantial cash payment.

Under George Christian, the conflict with Münster escalated. This conflict was based on compensation East Frisia had to pay under the Treaty of Berum, in exchange for the acquisition of the Lordships of Esens, Stedesdorf and Wittmund. Under the pretext of enforcing the payments, the Bishop of Münster marched his troops into East Frisia in 1663. Colonel Elverfeld conquered Hampoel and the Sconce at Diele on East Frisia's southern border. These were recaptured by Dutch troops in 1664. George Christian preferred to leave this kind of problem of his officials or the Estates.

Four months after his untimely death, George Christian's third child was born: a son named Christian Everhard. His widow, Christine Charlotte, led a rather unfortunate regency for the next 25 years.

== Personal life ==
In Tübingen he met his future wife, Christine Charlotte, a daughter of Duke Eberhard III, Duke of Württemberg from his first marriage to Anna Catharina of Salm-Kyrburg (1614-1655). He could only marry her after had he received the hereditary title of Imperial Prince on 18 April 1662. This gave him the proper rank to marry a Princess of Württemberg (German: Ebenbürtigkeit), and so the marriage was finally performed on 10 May 1662 in the city of Stuttgart. The union produced three children:

- Eberhardine Katharina (25 May 1663 – 10 July 1664), died in infancy.
- Juliane Charlotte (3 January 1664 – 3 June 1666), died in infancy.
- Christian Everhard (1 October 1665 – 30 June 1708), successor of his father.

== Ancestors ==
Ancestors of George Christian, Prince of East Frisia

16. Enno II of East Frisia
8. Edzard of East Frisia
17. Anna of Oldenburg
4. Enno III, Count of East Frisia
18. Gustav I of Sweden
9. Katarina Vasa
19. Margaret Leijonhufvud
2. Ulrich II, Count of East Frisia
20. Frederick I of Denmark
10. Adolf of Holstein-Gottorp
21. Sophie of Pomerania
5. Anna of Holstein-Gottorp
22. Philip I of Hesse
11. Christine of Hesse
23. Christine of Saxony
1. George Christian, Prince of East Frisia
24. Philip I of Hesse (= 22)
12. George I, Landgrave of Hesse-Darmstadt
25. Christine of Saxony (= 23)
6. Louis V, Landgrave of Hesse-Darmstadt
26. Bernhard VIII, Count of Lippe
13. Magdalene of Lippe
27. Catherine of Waldeck-Eisenberg
3. Juliana of Hesse-Darmstadt
28. Joachim II Hector, Elector of Brandenburg
14. John George, Elector of Brandenburg
29. Magdalena of Saxony
7. Magdalene of Brandenburg
30. Joachim Ernest, Prince of Anhalt
15. Elisabeth of Anhalt-Zerbst
31. Agnes of Barby

== References and sources ==
- Tielke, Martin (ed.): Biographisches Lexikon für Ostfriesland, Ostfriesisches Landschaftliche Verlag- und Vertriebsgeschäft, Aurich, vol. 1 ISBN 3-925365-75-3 (1993), vol. 2 ISBN 3-932206-00-2 (1997), vol. 3 ISBN 3-932206-22-3 (2001)
- Ernst Kaeber: Bilder aus dem Leben ostfries. Fürstlichkeiten des 17. Jahrhunderts. I. Die jüngeren Brüder des Fürsten Enno Ludwig. II. Aus dem Leben des Fürsten Christian Eberhard, Aurich, 1912
- Ernst Kaeber: Die Jugendzeit Fürst Enno Ludwigs von Ostfriesland, Aurich, 1911

George Christian, Prince of East Frisia Cirksena Born: 6 February 1634 Died: 6 June 1665
Preceded by Enno Louis	Prince of East Frisia; 1660–1665	Succeeded by Christine Charlotte as Regent
