= Ulrich II of East Frisia =

Count of East Frisia (1605–1648)

Ulrich II
- Count of East Frisia; Lord of Esens, Stedesdorf and Wittmund
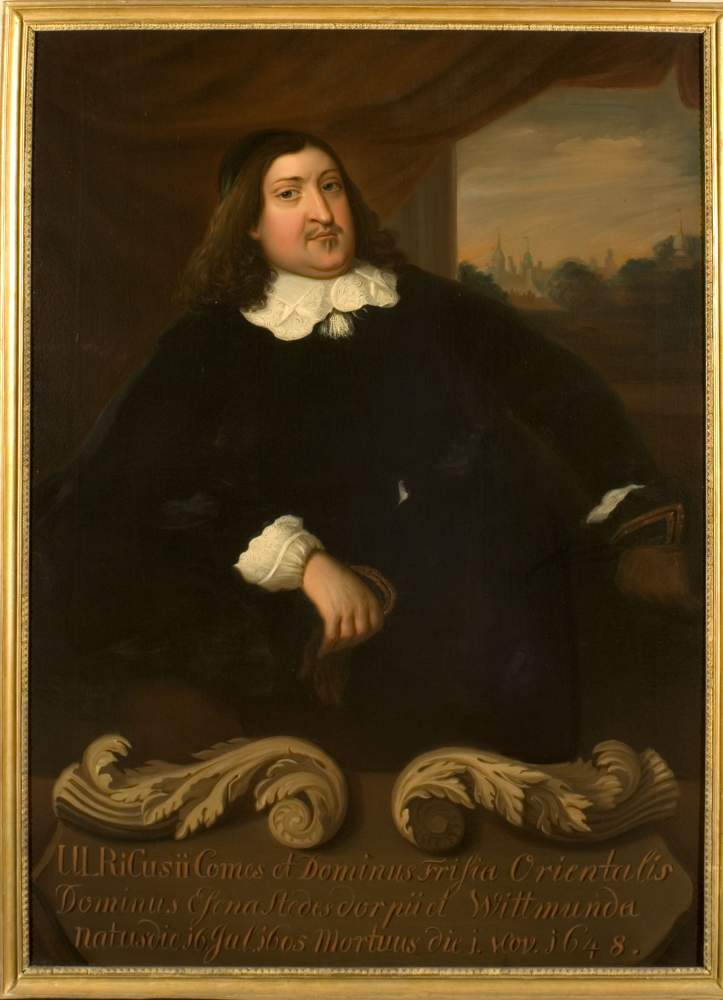
- Ulrich II, Count of East Frisia

Count of East Frisia; Lord of Esens, Stedesdorf and Wittmund
- Reign: 17 April 1628 - 1 November 1648
- Predecessor: Rudolf Christian
- Successor: Juliana of Hesse-Darmstadt (as regent)
- Born: 6 July 1605
- Died: 1 November 1648 (aged 43); Aurich
- Spouse: Juliana of Hesse-Darmstadt
- Issue: Enno Louis, Prince of East Frisia; George Christian, Prince of East Frisia; Count Ferdinand Edzard of East Frisia
- House: Cirksena
- Father: Enno III, Count of East Frisia
- Mother: Anna of Holstein-Gottorp
- Religion: Lutheranism

Ulrich II of East Frisia, was count of East Frisia, (6 July 1605 – Aurich, 1 November 1648) was the fifth child and the third son of Enno III, Count of East Frisia and Anna of Holstein-Gottorp. He inherited the East Frisia after the unexpected death of his brother Rudolf Christian on 17 April 1628. He reigned during the Thirty Years' War. East Frisia did not participate in the war, but general Ernst von Mansfeld quartered his troops in East Frisia, causing great distress. The only exception was Emden because of the recently completed city wall, the city of Emden was protected against foreign troops.

== Life ==
Historian tend to have a negative view of Ulrich II. His brother Rudolf Christian died unexpectedly, from a stab in his left eye during an argument with a lieutenant in the army of general Matthias Gallas quartered at Berum Castle. He accepted the position of Count of East Frisia only reluctantly. He was said to prefer to enjoy himself about town, deriving great pleasure from alcohol and well-prepared meals. In the face of the foreign troops quartered in East Frisia during the Thirty Years' War, he was rather passive and let his chancellors Wiarda and Bobart manage the country. He even went so far as to build a Lustschloss, the Julianenburg in Sandhorst, for his wife Landgravine Juliana, in the middle of the war, while the population of East Frisia was suffering bitterly. However, he also made some major decisions. He leased out parcels of bog around Timmel in 1633; this is regarded as the starting point of the fen cultivation, which led to the creation of the Großefehn. He also founded Latin schools, the Ulrichsgymnasium in Norden in 1631 and the Gymnasium Ulricianum in Aurich in 1646. These still exist and bear his name today.

He died on 1 November 1648. After his death his widow Juliana took over the regency because their children were still minors.

== Ancestors ==
Ancestors of Ulrich II of East Frisia

16. Edzard I, Count of East Frisia
8. Enno II, Count of East Frisia
17. Elisabeth of Rietberg
4. Edzard II, Count of East Frisia
18. John V, Count of Oldenburg
9. Anna of Oldenburg
19. Anna of Anhalt-Zerbst
2. Enno III, Count of East Frisia
20. Erik Johansson Vasa
10. Gustav I of Sweden
21. Cecilia Månsdotter
5. Catherine of Sweden
22. Erik Abrahamsson Leijonhufvud
11. Margaret Leijonhufvud
23. Ebba Eriksdotter Vasa
1. Ulrich II, Count of East Frisia
24. Christian I of Denmark
12. Frederick I of Denmark
25. Dorothea of Brandenburg
6. Adolf, Duke of Holstein-Gottorp
26. Bogislaw X, Duke of Pomerania
13. Sophie of Pomerania
27. Anna Jagiellon
3. Anna of Holstein-Gottorp
28. William II, Landgrave of Hesse
14. Philip I, Landgrave of Hesse
29. Anna of Mecklenburg-Schwerin
7. Christine of Hesse
30. George, Duke of Saxony
15. Christine of Saxony
31. Barbara Jagiellon

Ulrich II of East Frisia Cirksena Born: 6 July 1605 Died: 1 November 1648
| Preceded by Rudolf Christian | Count of East Frisia; 1628–1648 | Succeeded by Juliana as Regent |
