= Sandhorst =

- Stadtteil of Aurich
- Location of Sandhorst in Aurich
- Interactive map of Sandhorst
- Location within Germany Location within Lower Saxony
- Coordinates: 53°29′24″N 07°29′41″E
- Country: Germany
- State: Lower Saxony
- District: Aurich
- Town: Aurich

Area
  - Total: 10.77 km^{2} (4.16 sq mi)

Population (2021)
  - Total: 4,547
  - Density: 422.2/km^{2} (1,093/sq mi)
- Time zone: UTC+01:00 (CET)
  - Summer (DST): UTC+02:00 (CEST)
- Postal codes: 26603, 26607
- Dialling codes: 04941

Sandhorst is a village in the town of Aurich, the seat of the district of Aurich in East Frisia, Lower Saxony.

The formerly independent municipality Sandhorst existed for several hundred years. It was annexed in 1972 by Aurich in the wake of the Lower Saxon local government reform. It covers an area of approximately 10.8 square kilometers, with about 4000 inhabitants. With approximately 375 people per square kilometer, Sandhorst is the most densely populated of Aurich's 21 districts.

The district Sandhorst lies north of the city center. Neighbouring districts are Tannenhausen, Dietrichsfeld, Plaggenburg, Wallinghausen, Aurich and Walle.

Sandhorst shares a large industrial area with its northern neighbour, the district of Tannenhausen. Among others, this area houses the production facilities of the wind turbine manufacturer Enercon. In order to deliver the equipment manufactured here, trucks had to cross the town to reach federal highways 28 or 31 or the port of Emden. This led to significant traffic problems. To alleviate these problems, an old railway connection was reactivated in 2008.

Another important economic factor is the Blücher Barracks, where the 4th Division of the Luftwaffe has its seat. In the 1960s homes, a church, schools and a kindergarten a were built in the Sandhorst area for the families of them airmen.

Tourists can enjoy a large forest in the Sandhorst area, with play facilities for children and a fitness trail. The Sandhorst Mill was built in 1908 and is open for visitors. There are extensive bog areas to the east and northwest of Sandhorst, however, they have been cultivated for decades.
