= Anna of Holstein-Gottorp =

German noblewoman

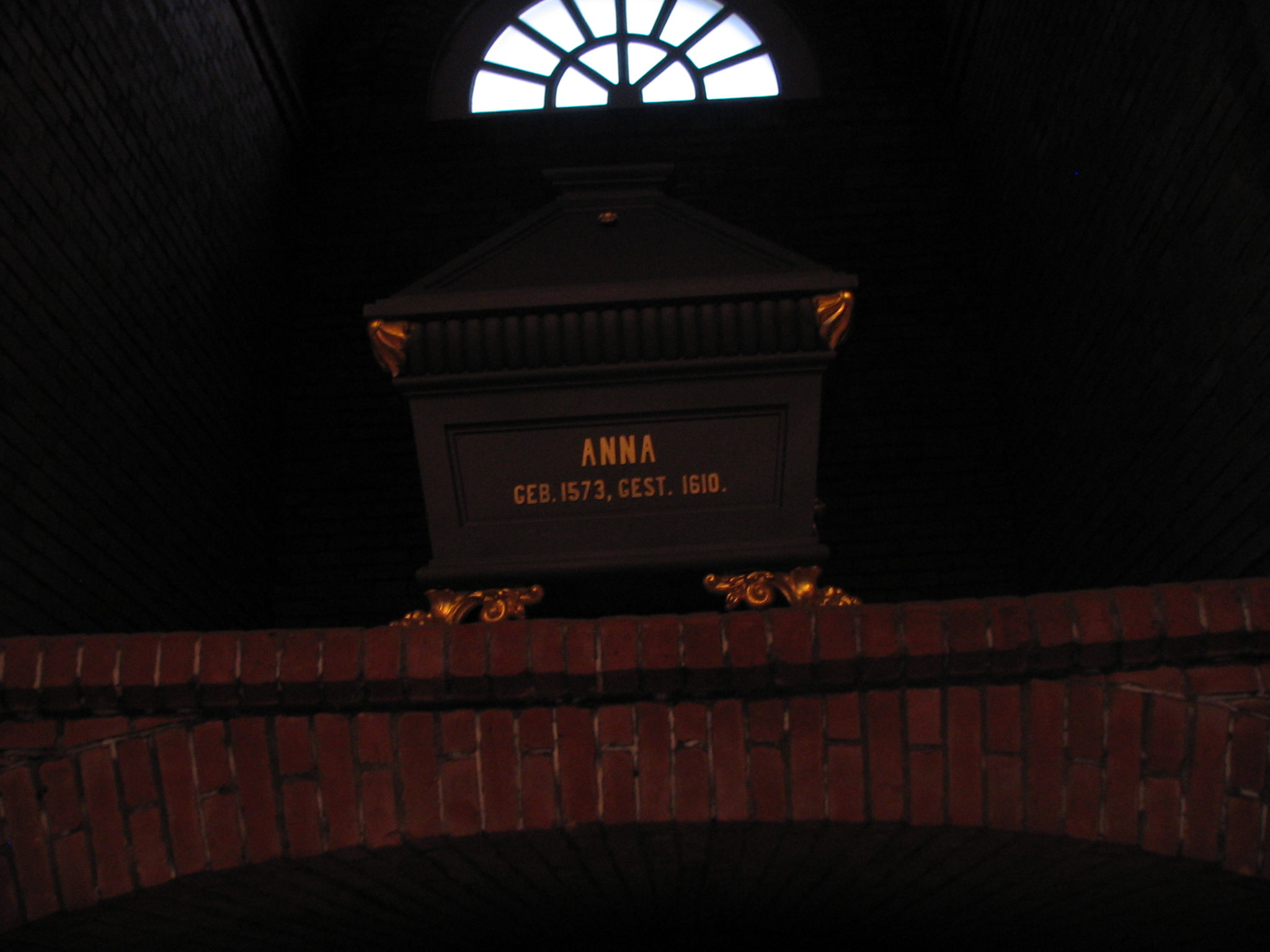

Countess consort of East Frisia
- Reign: 1 March 1599 - 24 April 1610
- Predecessor: Catherine of Sweden
- Successor: Juliana of Hesse-Darmstadt
- Born: 27 February 1575; Gottorp
- Died: 24 April 1610 (aged 35)
- Spouse: Enno III of Ostfriesland
- Issue: Anna Maria, Countess of Ostfriesland; Rudolf Christian, Count of Ostfriesland; Ulrich II, Count of Ostfriesland
- House: House of Holstein-Gottorp
- Father: Adolf of Holstein-Gottorp
- Mother: Christine of Hesse

Anna of Holstein-Gottorp (27 February 1575 – 24 April 1610) was a noblewoman from the Holy Roman Empire, member of the House of Holstein-Gottorp by birth and House of Hesse by marriage.

== Early life ==
Anna was born as the seventh child and fourth daughter of Duke Adolf of Holstein-Gottorp and his wife, Landgravine Christine of Hesse (daughter of Landgrave Philip I of Hesse).

== Personal life ==
On 28 January 1598, she married Count Enno III of Ostfriesland, elder son of Count Edzard II of Ostfriesland and his wife Princess Katarina of Sweden, eldest daughter of King Gustav I of Sweden. He was previously married to Countess Walburgis of Rietberg. They had the following children:

- Anna Maria, Countess of Ostfriesland (1601–1634), married Adolf Frederick I, Duke of Mecklenburg-Schwerin (1588–1658)
- Rudolf Christian, Count of Ostfriesland (1602–1628)
- Ulrich II, Count of Ostfriesland (1605–1648)

== Ancestry ==
Ancestors of Anna of Holstein-Gottorp

16. Dietrich, Count of Oldenburg
8. Christian I of Denmark
17. Hedvig of Holstein
4. Frederick I of Denmark
18. John, Margrave of Brandenburg-Kulmbach
9. Dorothea of Brandenburg
19. Barbara of Saxe-Wittenberg
2. Adolf, Duke of Holstein-Gottorp
20. Eric II, Duke of Pomerania
10. Bogislaw X, Duke of Pomerania
21. Sophie of Pomerania
5. Sophie of Pomerania
22. Casimir IV Jagiellon
11. Anna Jagiellon
23. Elisabeth of Austria
1. Anna of Holstein-Gottorp
24. Louis II, Landgrave of Hesse
12. William II, Landgrave of Hesse
25. Matilda of Württemberg-Urach
6. Philip I, Landgrave of Hesse
26. Magnus II, Duke of Mecklenburg-Schwerin and Güstrow
13. Anna of Mecklenburg-Schwerin
27. Sophie of Pomerania-Wolgast
3. Christine of Hesse
28. Albert III, Duke of Saxony
14. George, Duke of Saxony
29. Sidonie of Poděbrady
7. Christine of Saxony
30. Casimir IV Jagiellon (same as 22)
15. Barbara Jagiellon
31. Elisabeth of Austria (same as 23)

| Vacant Title last held by Catherine Vasa | Countess of East Frisia; 1559–1625 | Vacant Title next held by Juliana of Hesse-Darmstadt |
