= Eggerik Beninga =

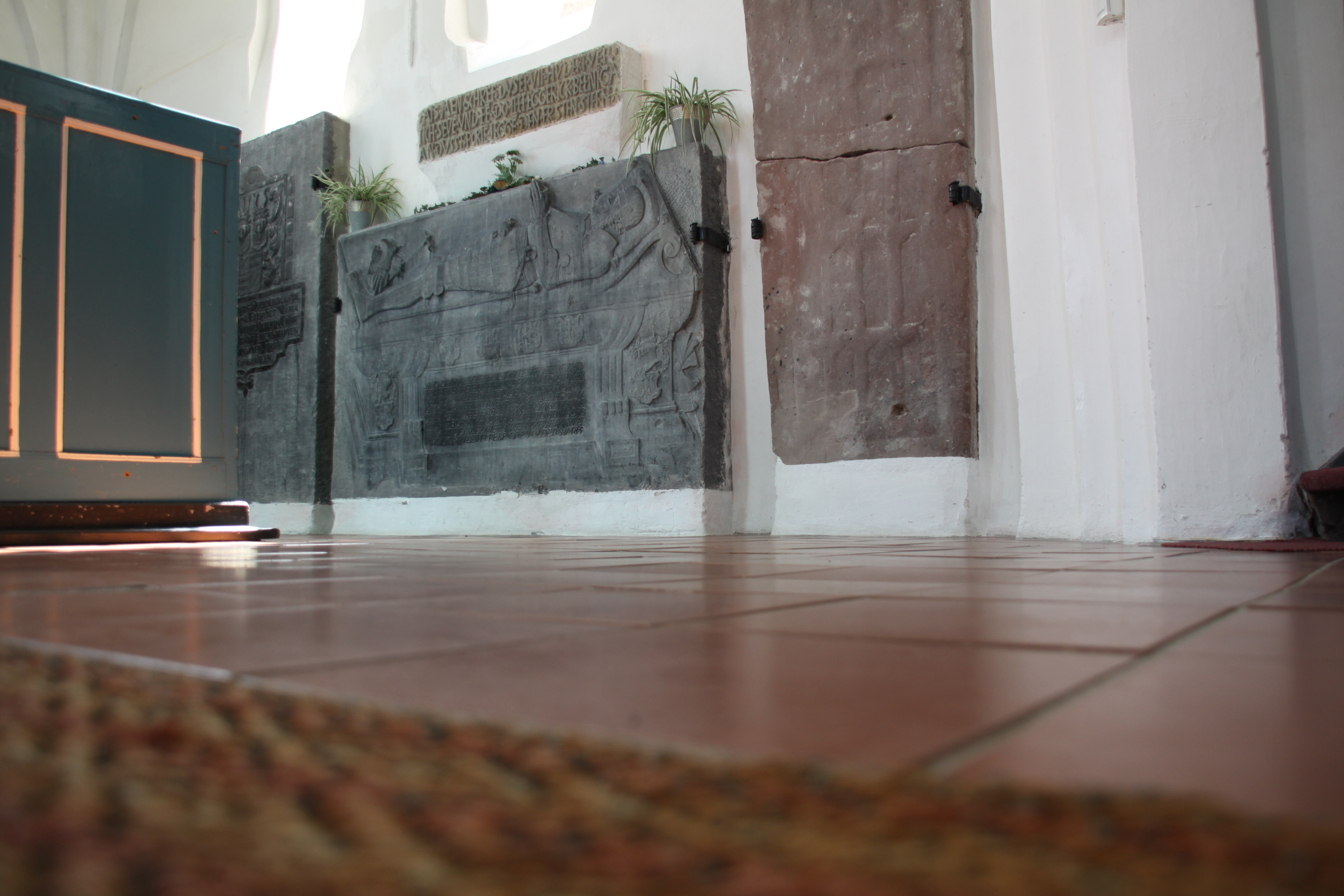
Eggerik Beninga's tomb in the Grimersum church

Eggerik Beninga (1490–1562), also known as Eggeric(k) Benninga or Benynga, was an East Frisian chronicler and steward of the Leerort Fortress. From 1540 to 1556 he was also counselor to Anna of Oldenburg. He wrote an account of the history of the Frisians until the year 1562 A.D.

Beninga was born in Grimersum, now a part of Krummhörn municipality, Germany. He was the son of Garrelt Beninga, chieftain and bailiff at Wirdum, Jennelt and Grimersum, and of Essa Houwerda of Up- and Wolthusen, daughter of Snelger Houwerda from Termunten. His father's family was an established family of East Frisian chieftains and Eggerik himself came to serve at the court of Edzard I, Count of East Frisia at a young age.

As a chronicler he wrote the Volledige Chronyk van Oostfrieslant in Dutch or Cronica der Fresen in Low German language [Complete Chronicle of East Frisia and Chronicle of the Frisians, respectively]. The account does not only deal with events concerning East Frisia but also lists the history of all neighbouring peoples. His sources remain unknown, which is why the authenticity of his work has been questioned. Many events described by Benninga are however known from secondary historians of the time.

His history of East Frisia was edited by Eilhardus Folkardus Harkenroth (1670–1732). Another edition by Anthonius Matthaeus was printed in Leiden in 1706 based on a different manuscript.

Eggerik Beninga died in Grimersum in 1562.

== Bibliography ==
- Beninga, Eggeric (1706). "Chronyk of Historie van Oost-Frieslandt". In Matthaeus, Anthonius (ed.). Veteris Aevi Analecta seu Vetera Monumenta (in Dutch and Latin). Leiden. Second edition (1738): Den Haag.
- Beninga, Eggerik (1723). Harkenroht, Eilhardus Folkardus (ed.). Volledige Chronyk van Oostfrieslant (in Dutch). Emden: Henrich Meybohm, Josua Beek & Hermannus Wolffram.
- Ramm, Heinz, ed. (1961–1964). Cronica der Fresen, bearb. von Louis Hahn. Quellen zur Geschichte Ostfrieslands (in Low German). Vol. 4. Aurich. This edition is based on a different manuscript than that by Harkenroht.
