= Enno III of East Frisia =

Count of East Frisia (1599–1625)

Enno III
- Count of East Frisia; Lord of Esens, Stedesdorf and Wittmund
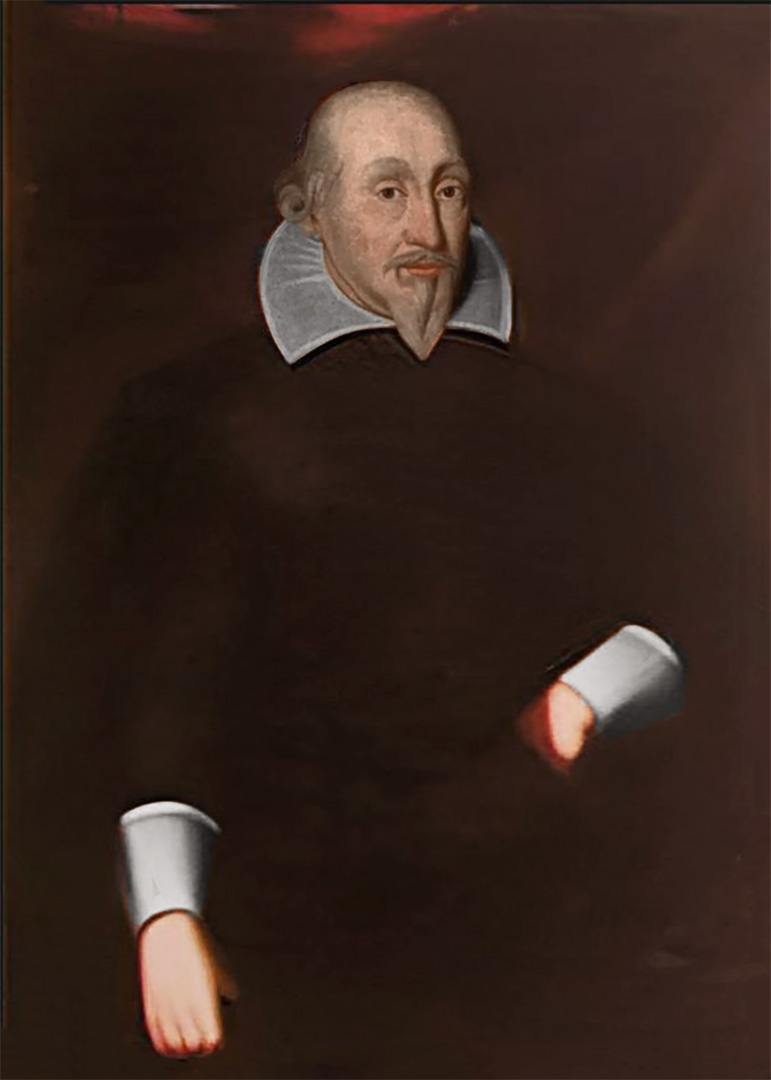
- Enno III, Count of East Frisia

Count of East Frisia
- Reign: 1 March 1599 - 19 August 1625
- Predecessor: Edzard II
- Successor: Rudolf Christian
- Alongside: Catherine of Sweden (1599–1610)

Count of Rietberg
- Reign: 13 July 1584 - 26 May 1586
- Predecessor: Armgard of Rietberg
- Successor: Sabina Catharina of East Frisia
- Alongside: Walburgis of Rietberg

Lord of Esens, Stedesdorf and Wittmund
- Reign: 28 January 1600 - 19 August 1625
- Predecessor: Sabina Catharina of East Frisia
- Successor: Rudolf Christian
- Born: 30 September 1563; Aurich
- Died: 19 August 1625 (aged 61); Leerort
- Spouse: Walburgis of Rietberg; Anna of Holstein-Gottorp
- House: Cirksena
- Father: Edzard II, Count of East Frisia
- Mother: Catherine of Sweden
- Religion: Lutheranism

Enno III of Ostfriesland or Enno III of East Frisia (30 September 1563, Aurich – 19 August 1625) was a Count of Ostfriesland from 1599 to 1625 from the Cirksena family. His reign was marked by political conflict with the estates and the city of Emden, deepening dependence on the Dutch Republic, and severe financial and territorial setbacks during the early phases of the Thirty Years’ War.

== Early life and background ==
Enno was the elder son of Count Edzard II of Ostfriesland and his wife Princess Katarina of Sweden, eldest daughter of King Gustav I of Sweden, making him a first cousin of Gustavus Adolphus. He was known for his cheerful temperament and ability to interact with people of all social classes. Enno had a particular fondness for the wild horses on the island of Juist and was the last ruler of East Frisia to speak East Frisian language.

== Marriage and inheritance ==
In 1581, at the age of 17, Enno married Countess Walburgis of Rietberg, who was eight years his senior. The marriage had been arranged in 1577 and marked the end of a long-standing dynastic goal: Walburg, as grand-niece of Balthasar of Esens, was heiress to the Harlingerland. Enno relocated his residence to Esens, formally becoming independent from his father. However, in 1586, Walburgis died shortly after giving birth to a son, Johann Edzard, who also died. She left two daughters.

In 1600, Enno settled their inheritance claims in Treaty of Berum, renouncing his rights to Rietberg in favour of his daughters. In return, he retained Harlingerland, formally a fief of the Duchy of Guelders, within the Cirksena dominions. The agreement stipulated a payment of 200,000 thalers, later raised to 300,000 Reichstalers.

== Reign ==
Upon the death of Edzard II in 1599, Enno assumed power and sought reconciliation with the East Frisian estates and the city of Emden. This led to the Emden Concord later that year, which initially provided a constitutional basis for cooperation. He met and hosted Safavid ambassador Hossein Ali Beg Bayat in same city later in 1601. Later however, Enno's chronic financial difficulties prompted him to impose a general tax across East Frisia. This provoked resistance, particularly in the city of Norden and Emden, where citizens viewed it as overreach. Armed conflict ensued. Enno raised mercenary troops and built a redoubt at Logum near Emden to cut off the city’s maritime access. In response, Emden appealed to the Dutch Republic, whose forces expelled Enno's troops in 1602 and established a permanent garrison in the city—a presence that lasted until 1744.On 8 April 1603 Enno had to sign the Treaty of Hague in which he not only accepted the presence of a Dutch garrison in Emden, but agreed to pay the costs for the Dutch garrison. In 1609 the conflict broke out again; the Emders were victorious in a skirmish at Greetsiel and temporarily occupied the Count's residence at Aurich.

In 1611, Enno conceded further, allowing the Dutch to permanently occupy the fortress of Leerort. This formalised East Frisia’s semi-vassal status to the Dutch and marked the effective loss of the county's autonomy in foreign and military affairs.

In the Accord of Osterhusen in 1611, Enno was forced to affirm the rights of the estates, codifying the dualism between princely authority and estate privileges in East Frisia. He ceded significant powers over taxation, military command, territorial governance, leasing rights, and clerical appointments. In 1615, recognising the Dutch dominance, Enno formally applied to incorporate East Frisia into the Dutch Republic, but the local estates rejected the proposal.

Though East Frisia remained officially neutral during the Thirty Years’ War, its strategic location made it a target for exploitation. In 1621, at Dutch behest, the mercenary commander Ernst von Mansfeld was quartered in the region. His troops committed widespread atrocities. Enno, virtually a prisoner in his castle at Esens, was powerless to resist. That same year, Mansfeld’s forces looted the 300,000 Reichstalers that had been prepared and sealed in barrels as compensation for Enno’s son-in-law, Prince Gundakar of Liechtenstein. These debts remained a severe financial burden for the Cirksena family.

In 1625, shortly after the departure of Mansfeld’s troops, East Frisia was struck by the devastating storm tides of the North Sea, compounding the crisis. Enno died on 19 August 1625 in Leerort, his reign having begun with promise but ending in disaster and near-complete political collapse.

== Family and children ==
Enno III was married twice. Firstly, he married Countess Walburgis of Rietberg (1556–1586), daughter and heiress of Count John II of Rietberg, Lord of Esens, Stedesdorf and Wittmund and Countess Agnes of Bentheim-Steinfurt. Countess Walburgis, a descendant of Hero Oomkens von Esens, brought the Lordships of Esens, Stedesdorf and Wittmund and County of Rietberg to East Frisia. They had three children:

1. Sabina Catherine (11 August 1582 – 31 May 1618), married on 4 March 1601 to her uncle Count John III of East Frisia (1566 – 23 January 1625)
2. Agnes of East Frisia (1 January 1584 – 28 February 1616), married on 15 August 1603 to Prince Gundakar of Liechtenstein (30 January 1580 – 5 August 1658)
3. John Edzard, (10 May 1586 – 20 May 1586), buried in Esens (St. Magnus)

Countess Walburgis of Rietberg died only few days after her son. Allegedly she was poisoned. Three women, sisters Anna and Hille Evken, and their mother Stine Essken were burnt at the stake for this.

After the male line of the counts of Rietberg became extinct, the counts of East Frisia became their successor due to the marital connection of Enno III with Walburgis.

On 28 January 1598 Enno III married Anna of Holstein-Gottorp, (27 February 1575 – 24 April 1610), daughter of Duke Adolf of Holstein-Gottorp. They had five children:

1. Edzard Gustav (15 April 1599 – 18–19 April 1612)
2. Anna Maria (23 June 1601 – 4 September 1634), married on 4 September 1622 to Duke Adolf Frederick I of Mecklenburg-Schwerin.
3. Rudolf Christian, Count of East Frisia (25 June 1602 – 17 June 1628)
4. Ulrich II, Count of East Frisia (16 July 1605 – 11 January 1648) married on 5 March 1631 Juliana of Hesse-Darmstadt (14. April 1606 – 15. June 1659),
5. Christina Sophia (26 September 1609 – 20 March 1658), married on 2 June 1632 to Landgrave Philip III of Hesse-Butzbach (26 December 1581 –28. April 1643).

== Ancestors ==
Ancestors of Enno III of East Frisia

16. Ulrich I, Count of East Frisia
8. Edzard I, Count of East Frisia
17. Theda Ukena
4. Enno II, Count of East Frisia
18. John I, Count of Rietberg
9. Elisabeth of Rietberg
19. Margaret of Lippe
2. Edzard II, Count of East Frisia
20. Gerhard VI, Count of Oldenburg
10. John V, Count of Oldenburg
21. Adelheid of Tecklenburg
5. Anna of Oldenburg
22. George I, Prince of Anhalt-Dessau
11. Anna of Anhalt-Zerbst
23. Anna of Lindow-Ruppin
1. Enno III, Count of East Frisia
24. Johan Kristiernsson Vasa
12. Erik Johansson Vasa
25. Birgitta Gustafsdotter Sture
6. Gustav I of Sweden
26. Magnus Karlsson Eka
13. Cecilia Månsdotter
27. Sigrid Eskilsdotter Banér
3. Catherine of Sweden
28. Abraham Kristiernsson Leijonhufvud
14. Erik Abrahamsson Leijonhufvud
29. Birgitta Månsdotter Natt och Dag
7. Margaret Leijonhufvud
30. Erik Karlsson Vasa
15. Ebba Eriksdotter Vasa
31. Anna Karlsdotter (Vinstorpa)

Enno III of East Frisia Cirksena Born: 30 September 1563 Died: 19 August 1625
Preceded by Edzard II	Count of East Frisia; 1599–1625	Succeeded by Rudolf Christian
