= Walburgis, Countess of Rietberg =

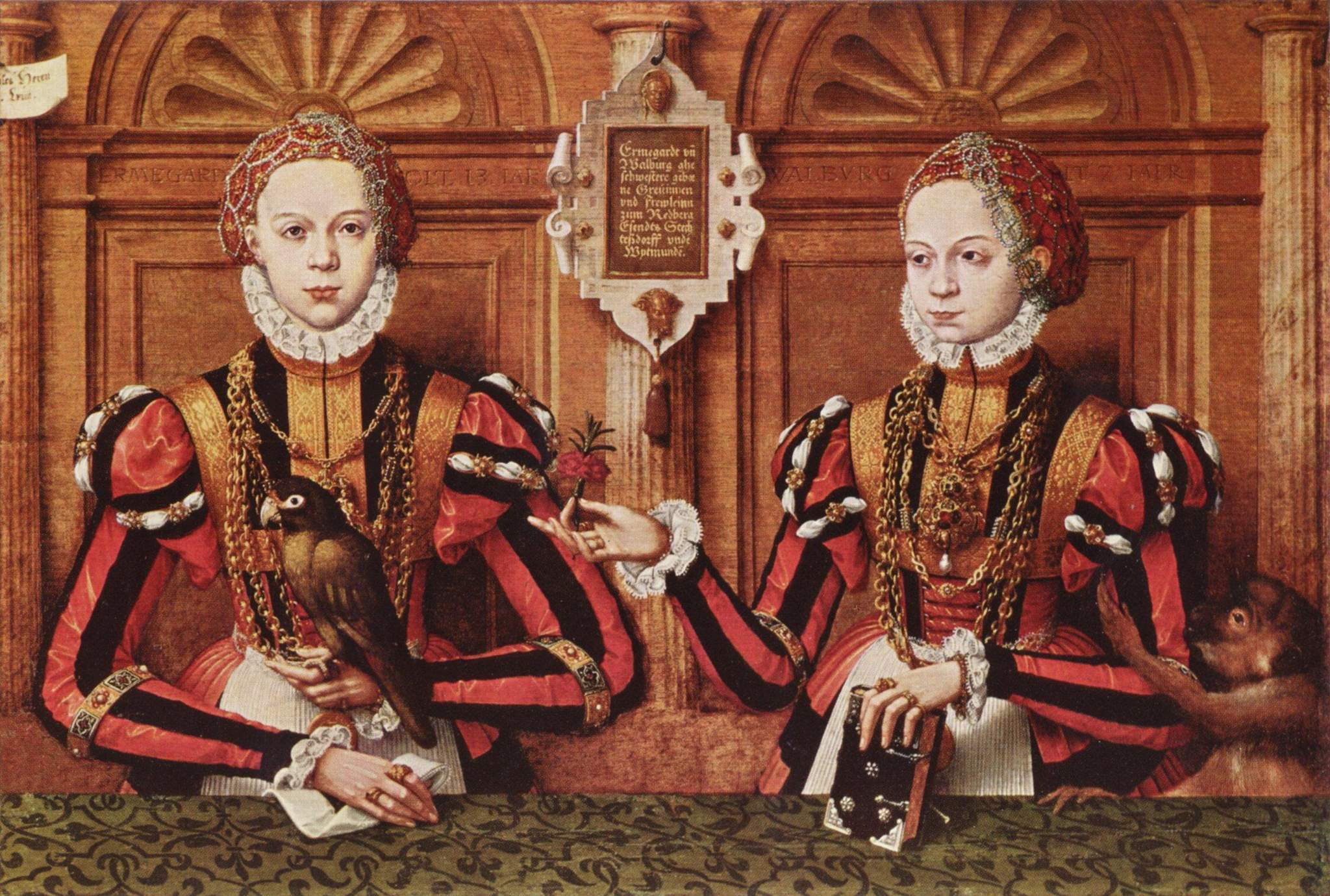
- Armgard and Walburgis of Rietberg, detail of a family portrait by Hermann tom Ring

Countess of Rietberg
- 1st reign: 1565 - 27 September 1576
- Predecessor: Agnes of Bentheim-Steinfurt (as regent)
- Successor: Armgard of Rietberg (as sole ruler)
- Alongside: Armgard of Rietberg (1565–1576)
- 2nd reign: 13 July 1584 - 26 May 1586
- Predecessor: Armgard of Rietberg
- Successor: Sabina Catharina of East Frisia

Lady of Esens, Stedesdorf and Wittmund
- Reign: 1565 - 26 May 1586
- Predecessor: Agnes of Bentheim-Steinfurt (as regent)
- Successor: Sabina Catharina of East Frisia
- Alongside: Armgard of Rietberg (1565–1576)
- Born: 1555 or 1556; Rietberg
- Died: 26 May 1586 (aged 30); Esens
- Spouse: Enno III, Count of East Frisia
- Issue Detail: Sabina Catharina of East Frisia
- House: Werl-Arnsberg-Cuyk
- Father: John II, Count of Rietberg
- Mother: Agnes of Bentheim-Steinfurt

Countess Walburgis of Rietberg (1555/56, Rietberg – 26 May 1586, Esens) was 1565–1576 and 1584–1586 Countess of Rietberg.

== Life ==
Walburgis was the second daughter of Count John II of Rietberg and his wife, Countess Agnes of Bentheim-Steinfurt in Rietberg. After the birth of John Edzard, her youngest child and only son, Walburgis needed to recover and moved from Esens to Wittmund. A short time later, she moved back to Esens, where she died on 26 May 1586 at the age of 30. She was buried in the St. Magnus Church in Esens. With her death, the Rietberg line of the House of Werl-Arnsberg died out.

After Walburgis's death rumors spread that she had been poisoned with a poisoned beer soup. Under torture, one of the three women suspected of the crime confessed. Although the doctors certified a natural death, the three suspects were burned on the stake on 11 May 1586.

== Marriage and descendants ==
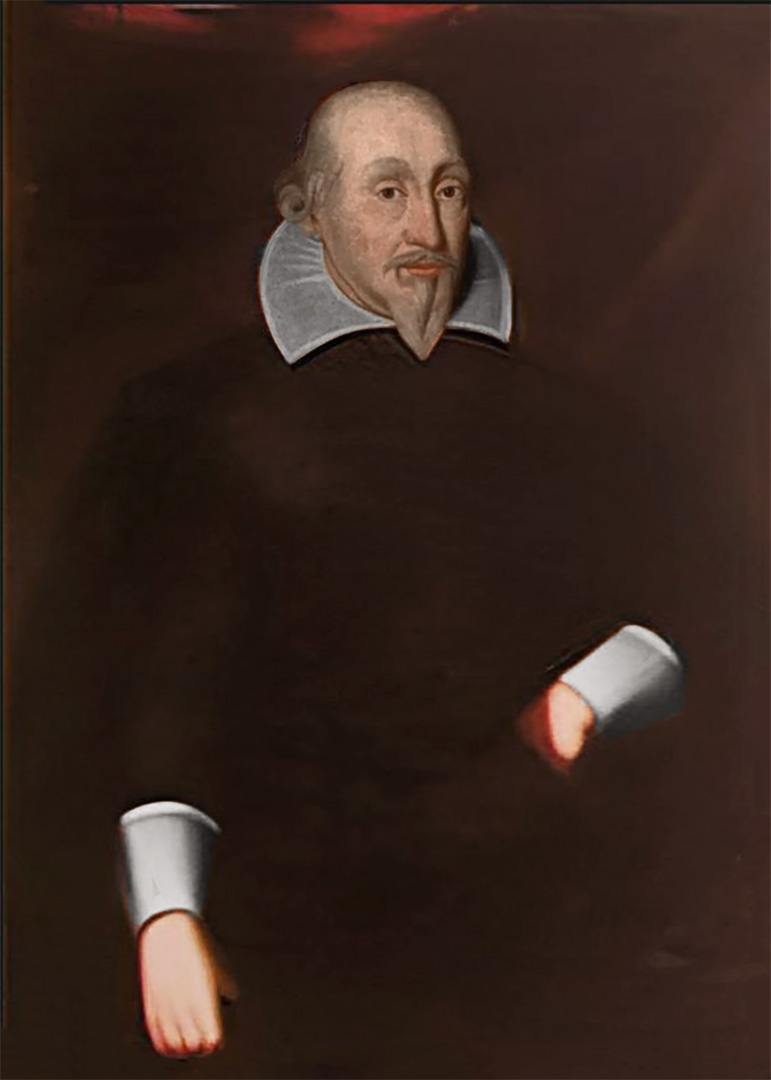
Count Enno III of East Frisia, Walburgis's husband

On 1 May 1577, at the age of 21 years, Walburgis was engaged to Count Enno III of East Frisia, who was then 14 years old. The wedding took place on 28 January 1581, when Enno was 18. From this marriage, she had three children:

- Sabina Catherine (born: 11 August 1582 – died: 31 May 1618)

married on 4 March 1601 her uncle Count John III of East Frisia (born: 1566 – died: 29 September 1625)

- Agnes (born: 1 January 1584 – died: 28 February 1616)

married on 15 August 1603 Prince Gundakar of Liechtenstein (born: 30 January 1580 – died: 5 August 1658)

- John Edzard (born: 2 March 1586 – died: 13 March 1586), buried in the St. Magnus Church in Esens

Walburgis, Countess of Rietberg House of Werl-Arnsberg Born: 1555 or 1556 Died: 26 May 1586
Preceded by Armgard	Countess of Rietberg; 1565–1576 and 1584–1586	Succeeded by Sabina Catherine
