= Cirksena =

Ruling family of East Frisia

House of Cirksena
- Noble family
- Coat of arms
- Country: Netherlands; Belgium; Germany; France
- Founded: 15th century
- Founder: Ulrich I of East Frisia (first count)
- Final ruler: Charles Edzard (in East Frisia); Maria Ernestine Francisca (in Rietberg); Christine Luise (in Kriechingen)
- Titles: Prince of East Frisia; Count of Rietberg; Count of Kriechingen; Count of Norden; Lord of Esens, Stedesdorf and Wittmund; Lord of Groningen; Lord of the Ommelanden; Lord of Heeswijk
- Estates: Greetsiel Castle; Emden Castle; Aurich Castle; Berum Castle; Stickhausen Castle; Fortress Leerort
- Dissolution: 1744; 282 years ago (in East Frisia); 1758; 268 years ago (in Rietberg); 1732; 294 years ago (in Kriechingen)
- Cadet branches: Cirksena-Falkenburg (extinct) Cirksena-Rietberg (extinct) Kaunitz-Rietberg (matrilineal, extinct) Cirksena-Kriechingen (extinct)

The House of Cirksena was the ruling family of East Frisia (German: Ostfriesland). They descended from a line of East Frisian chieftains from Greetsiel.

== East Frisia ==
In 1439, in the wake of clashes between different lines of chieftains, the town of Emden was first placed by Hamburg under direct rule and then, in 1453, given to the Cirksena. The family administered and ruled the town until 1595.

The Cirksena gained strength and succeeded the chieftain line of the tom Broks, after their opponent Focko Ukena was defeated and expelled by several allied chieftains, led by Edzard Cirksena. Ulrich Cirksena (d. 1466) was elevated to the rank of imperial count by Emperor Frederick III and enfeoffed with the Imperial County of East Frisia.

The most important ruler from the House of Cirksena was Edzard I (1462–1528), under whose leadership the Imperial County of East Frisia reached its greatest extent. During his reign, the Reformation spread throughout East Frisia. In 1654, the Cirksena were elevated to princes by the emperor. Charles Edzard, the last ruler from the House of Cirksena, died without issue during the night of 25/26 May 1744 (reportedly from a glass of buttermilk, which he is said to have drunk after a hunt). Immediately thereafter, the state was taken over by Frederick the Great.

== Rietberg ==
The Cirksena provided the County of Rietberg rulers from 1581 to 1699. This initially happened as a personal union with East Frisia after Count Enno III had married Rietberg's daughter-heir, Walburg von Rietberg. In the Treaty of Berum (1600), however, he ceded the County of Rietberg to his daughters.

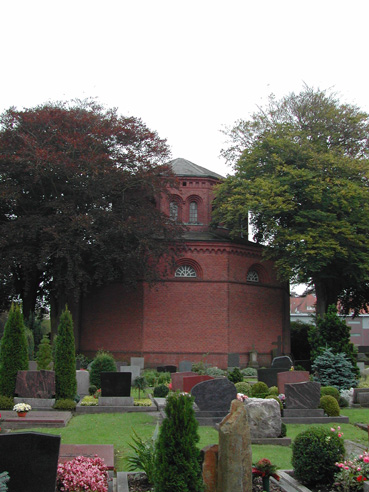
The Cirksena mausoleum in Aurich

In 1601, Enno's brother, Count John III, married his niece, Sabina Catherine, Enno's daughter and heiress of Rietberg, with papal dispensation. Both were converted to Catholicism, and the Catholic branch line of the House of Cirksena was founded. The last male descendant of the House of East Frisia in Rietberg, Count Ferdinand Maximilian, died in 1687. His heiress, Maria Ernestine Francisca, married Maximilian Ulrich von Kaunitz in 1699.

== Coat of arms ==
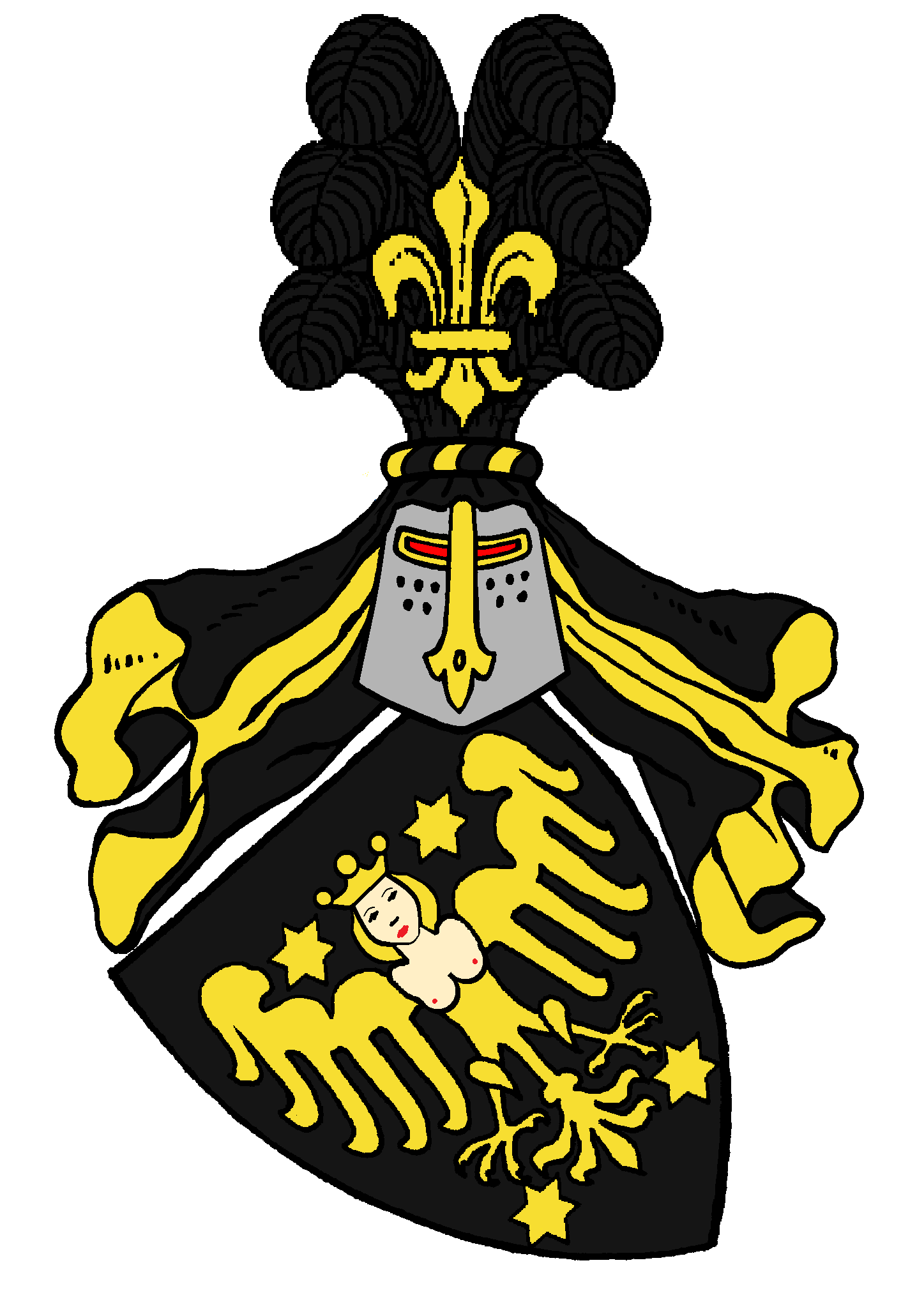
Original coat of arms of the House of Cirksena from the 14th century, from 1454 rulers of Ostfriesland and from 1581 rulers of Rietberg

The coat of arms of the family of Cirksena displays a crowned, golden harpy (or angel) on a black field. This motif appears in a variety of successor coats of arms; for example, in the final comital coat of arms of East Frisia, which Count Rudolf Christian adopted in 1625. Here, the harpy is in the upper left of the shield. This coat of arms is still used today as the emblem of East Frisia.

The upper half of Emden's coat of arms also depicts the Cirksena harpy. Until the Emden Revolution in 1595, the Cirksena resided in the town of Emden. Even the Dutch town of Delfzijl opposite Emden incorporated the Cirksena coat of arms into its own. This goes back to the rule of Edzard the Great in Groningerland. Likewise, the harpy is part of the coat of arms of Aurich district, albeit in a different colour, which also goes back to the Cirksena. Even the present-day municipality of Krummhörn, where the ancestral homeland of the Cirksena lay, has the family's coat of arms in its municipal shield.

After the Cirksena had taken over the reins of power in the County of Rietberg, their emblem was also found in Rietberg's coat of arms, between the coat of arms of the old ruling family and that of the Lordships of Esens, Stedesdorf and Wittmund. It was later supplemented by the Kaunitz family's coat of arms.

Through the link between East Frisia and Rietberg, the Cirksena harpy is still part of the coat of arms of the Principality of Liechtenstein, albeit in the reverse colours (black and gold), at the bottom right (heraldic: bottom left). Gundakar of Liechtenstein had married Agnes Cirksena, the second daughter of Count Enno III and Walburgis of Rietberg, and had a claim to Rietberg as a result.

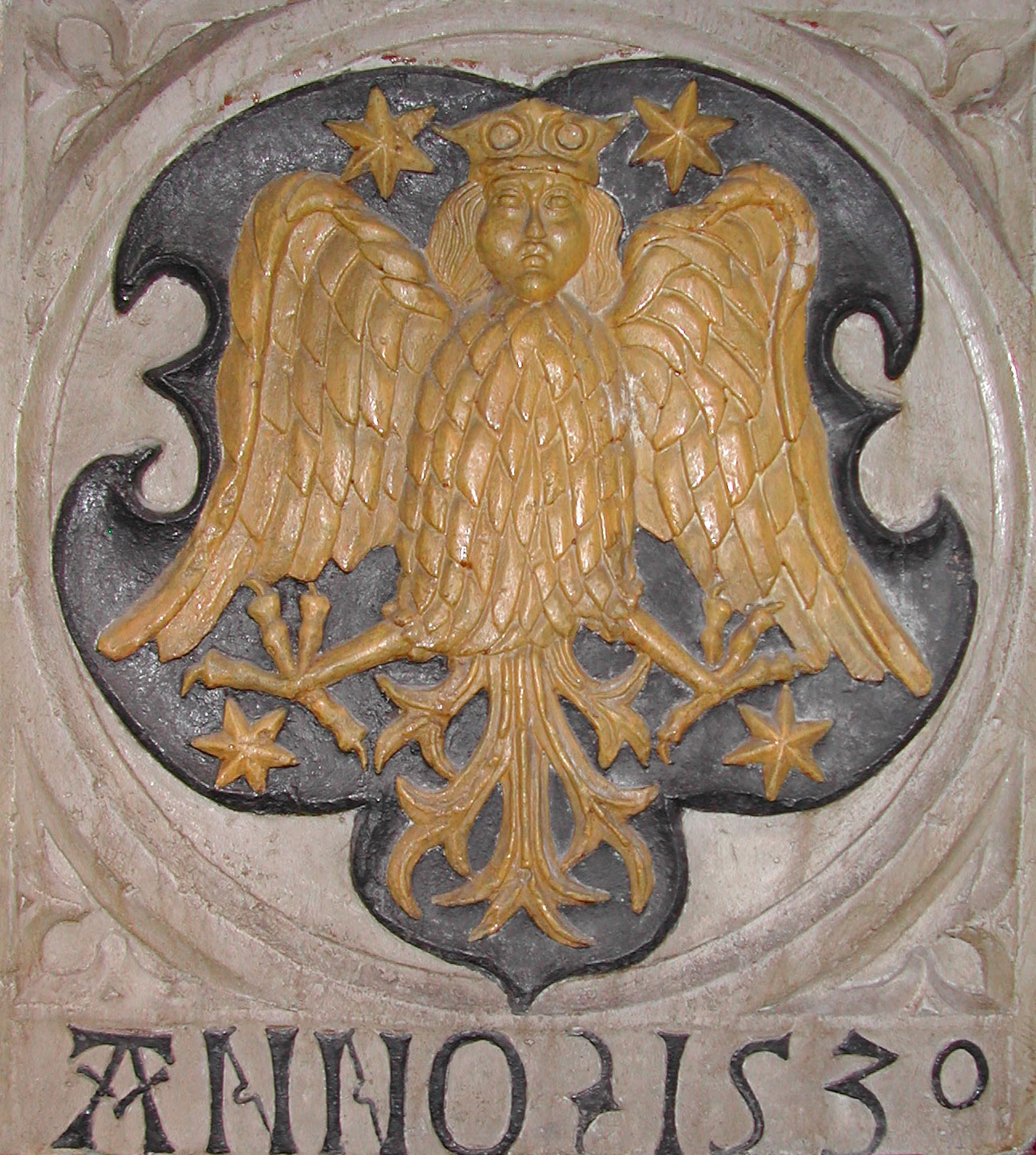
Cirksena coat of arms

Coat of arms of East Frisia

Emden coat of arms

Coat of arms of Delfzijl

Coat of arms of Aurich district

Coat of arms of Liechtenstein

Coat of arms of the Kaunitz-Rietberg family

Coat of arms of Krummhörn

== Origin of the name ==
The name Cirksena is of Frisian origin and is still a widespread family name in East Frisia today. It probably goes back to the old forename Tzirk (Cirk). Enno Attena took over the respectable name on his marriage to the daughter-heir, Gela Syardsna of Manslagt.

== Genealogy ==
Syert/Syrt/Syrtatus, Captain of Norden, +after 1255; m. NN Aldersna; They had issue: A1. Enno, +after 1280; m. N van Norden

B1. Sitat, Captain of Norden, +after 1310

  C1. Enno, Captain of Norden, +after 1340

    D1. Sitat (?), +after 1400; m. Frouwa N (+after 1437)
    D2. a daughter; m. Hylo Atena, Captain of Norden (+after 1367)
    D3. a daughter; m. Affo Beninga van Pirsum, heer van Bersum (+1402)
    D4. a daughter
    D5. Frouwa, +after 1437

B2. Idzerd, Captain of Appingen, +after 1312; m. Etta van Visquard (+after 
     1312)
 C1. Enno, Captain of Appingen, +after 1350; m. Adda van Groothusen
 D1. Etta; m. Hera Attena, heer van Dornum (+after 1410)
 D2. Idzerd, Captain of Appingen, +1406; 1m: Doda ten Book, dau.of Keno 
     Hilmersna; 2m: N.von Engena (?)
  E1. Enno
  E2. Imel, Captain of Eilsum, +after 1404
  F1. Sibrand, Captain of Eilsum, +4.4.1465
  E3. Haro, +after 1408
  E4. Enno, Captain of Norden, Greetsiel, Berva and Pilsum, +ca 1450; 1m: 
      Gela Beningna von Manslagt (+after 1429); 2m: Ellen Sytzena, dau.of 
      Affo Beninga van Pilsum, heer van Bersum en Tiadeke (+1450), widow of 
      Ewo van Westerhusen
   F1. [1m.] Frouwa; 1m: Sibet Attena (+1433); 2m: Eppo Gokkinga 
           (+after 1437)
   F2. Edzard, Judge of Frisia, +after 1441; 1m: Moeder Ennosna 
       (+1438); 2m: Frouwe, dau.of Ewo von Westerhusen and Ellen Sytzena
   F3. Ulrich I, Statolder of Ostfriesland (1454–64), 1st Graf von 
       Ostfriesland (1464–66), +27.9.1466; 1m: Foelke van Esens (+1452); 
       2m: 1453 Theda Ukena, dau.of Uko van Oldersum (*ca 1434,+17.9.1494)
   G1. [2m.] Hebe, *18.11.1457, +1476/78; m. Gf Erich I von Schaumburg- 
       Pinneberg (*1420, +24/25.3.1492)
   G2. Gela, *1458, +1497
   G3. Enno I, Graf von Ostfriesland (1466–91), *1.6.1460,+drowned 22.2.1491
   G4. Edzard I, Graf von Ostfriesland (1491–1528), *15.2.1462,+15.2.1528; 
       m. 8.7.1498 Elisabeth Gfn von Rietberg, dau.of GfJohann I von Rietberg 
       by Margarethe zur Lippe (*ca 1475,+13.7.1512)
   H1. Ulrich, Graf von Ostfriesland(1528–32), Valet of Emperor Maximilian I, 
       *1499, +in madness 1532
   H2. Margarete, *1500, +Altenwildungen 15.7.1537; m. Emden 17.2.1523 
       Gf Philipp IV von Waldeck-Wildungen (*1493 +1574)
   H3. Theda, *1502, +1563
   H4. Enno II, Graf von Ostfriesland (1532–40), *VIII.1505,+24.9.1560; 
       m. 6.3.1530 Anna von Oldenburg (*14.11.1501,+10.11.1575)
   H5. Johann, heer van Falkenburg, Durbuy en Halem, *1506 +Schloss 
       Falkenburg 6.6.1572; m. 11.11.1539 Dorothea von Habsburg, heiress 
        of Falkenburg, Durbuy and Halem, illegitimate dau. of Emperor Maximilian I (*1516 +1572)
    I1. Maximilian, heer van Falkenburg, Durbuy en Halem,*1542, +ca 1603; 
        m. 14.9.1564 Barbara de Lalaing
    J1. Christoph, heer van Falkenburg, Durbuy en Halem, +1636
    J2. Dorothea, +1604; m. before 1.4.1592 Jacob t'Serclaes, Gf von 
        Tilly et baron de Marbais (*1564, +11.10.1624)
    J3. Katharina Maria; m. François de Rye, marquis de Varambon
    J4. Louise, *ca 1565, +16.10.1607; m. 5.5.1601 Evrad de Limburg, baron de 
        Barbançon (+31.12.1608)
    I2. Anna; m. Jodocus van Bronckhorst, Gf von Gronsfeld and Limburg 
        (+1588/89)
    I3 Gisela; m. Heinrich van Hahnsberg, Heer van Bruck (+1590)
    H6. Anna, +1530
    H7. Armgard, +1559
    G5. Uko, *1463, +1507
    G6. Almuth, *1465, +1522/23; m. Engelmann von Horstell
    F4. Adda, +ca 1470; m. Weren't Maninga von Bersum (+1450)
    F5. [2m.] Tiadeke, *1438 ?, +after 1470
    E5. [2m.] Doda; m.Reduard Hyetsna, heer van Groothusen
  C2. Sibrand, Captain of Eilsum, +after 1379; m.N von Ilsum (?)
    D1. a son van Eilsum

A2. Merten, +after 1288; m. N von Berum

B1. Omptat, +after 1310
  C1. Merten, +after 1367/78
    D1. Omptat van Bersum, +after 1378
    D2. Olrik van Bersum, +after 1373
    D3. Bojo
    D4. [parentage uncertain] Tiadeke, +after 1409;1402 m. Affo Beninga von 
     Pilsum Lord of Bersum (+1402)

== See also ==
- List of counts of East Frisia

== Sources ==
- Hobbing, Hans Heinrich (1915). Die Begründung der Erstgeburtsnachfolge im ostfriesischen Grafenhaus der Cirksena. Aurich(Abhandlungen und Vorträge zur Geschichte Ostfrieslands, 19)
- Reimers, Heinrich (1925) Ostfriesland bis zum Aussterben seines Fürstenhauses. Bremen
- Esselborn, Ernst (1945). Das Geschlecht Cirksena. Berlin
