= Lordships of Esens, Stedesdorf and Wittmund =

Territory in the Holy Roman Empire

Lordships of Esens, Stedesdorf and Wittmund Herrlichkeiten Esens, Wittmund und Stedesdorf (German)
- 1455–1744
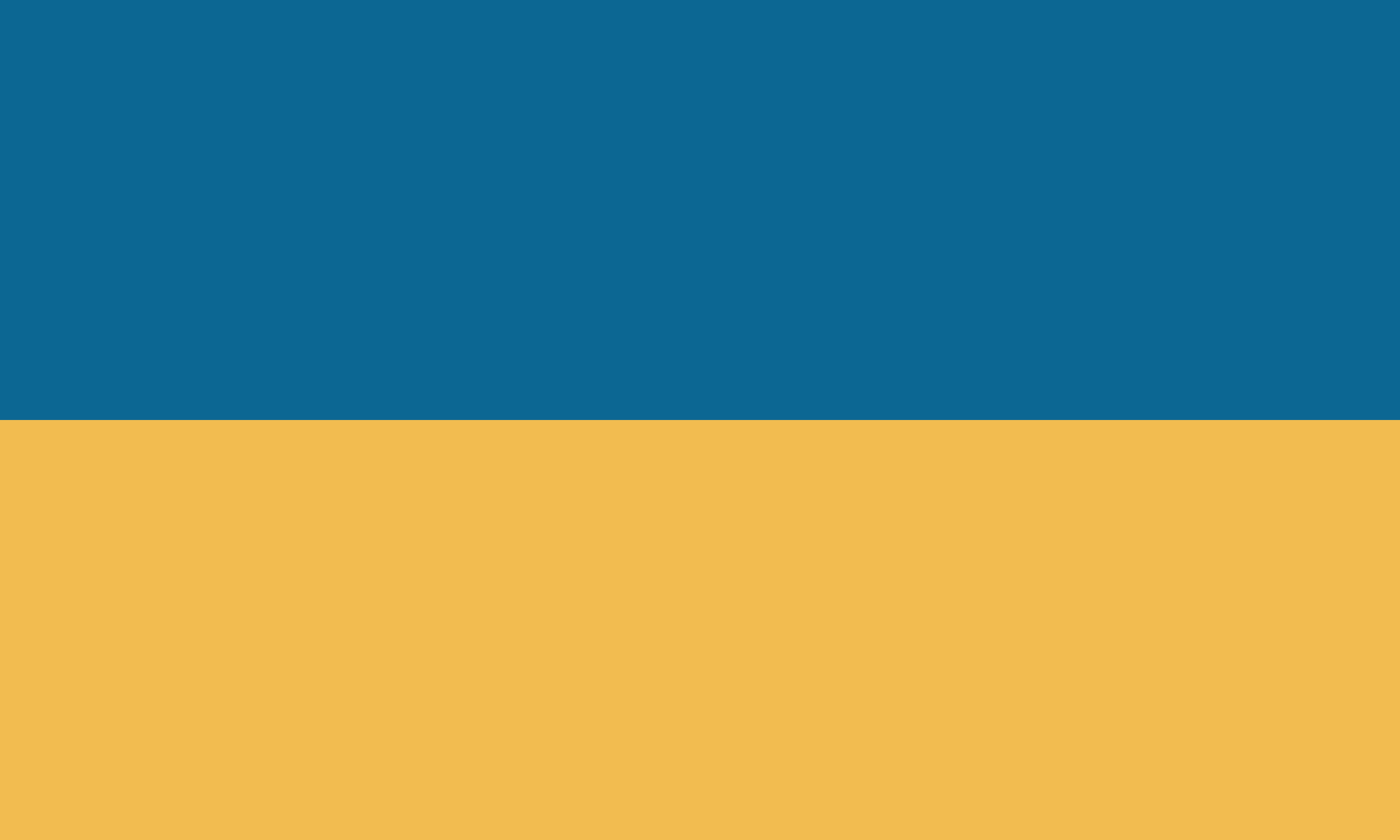
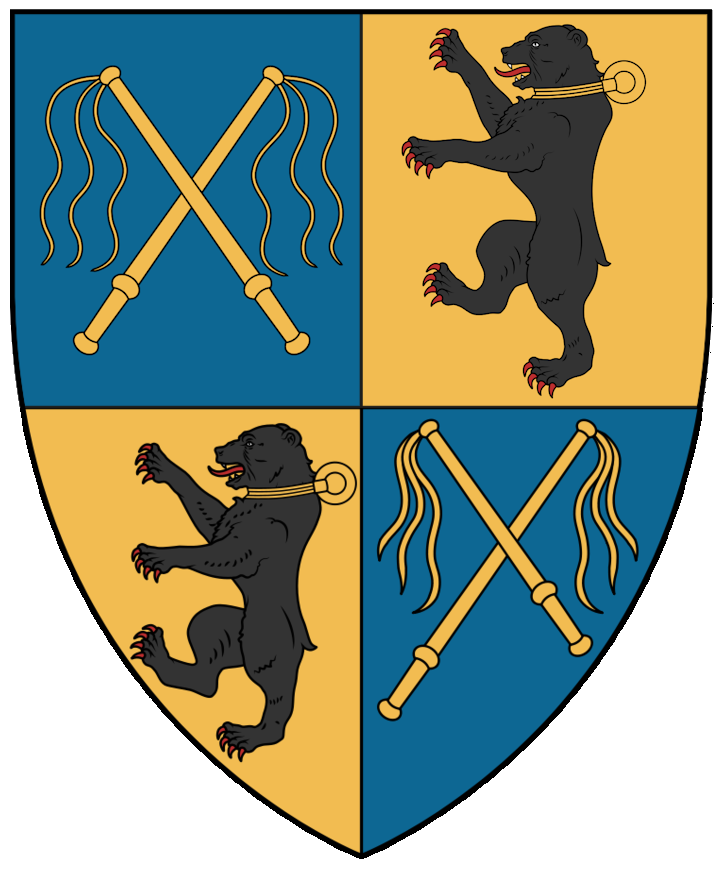
- Flag Coat of arms

- Map of the Lordships Esens, Stedesdorf and Wittmund around 1560

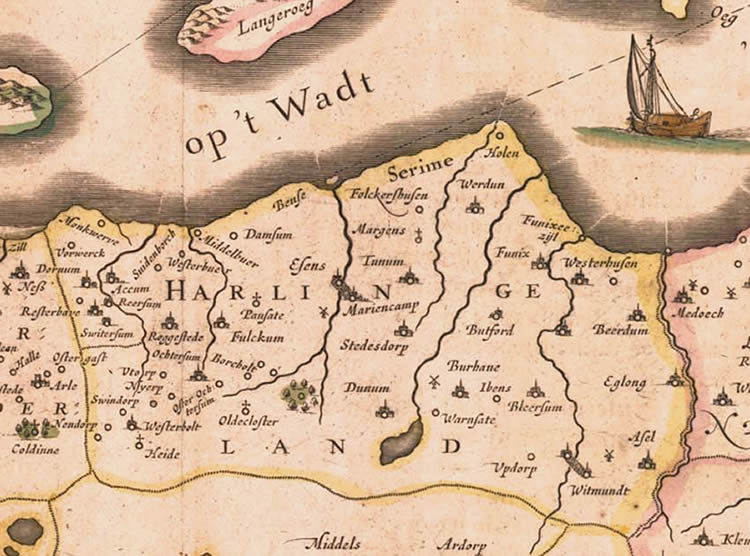
- Esens, Stedesdorf and Wittmund around 1600, by Ubbo Emmius
- Status: Lordship of the Holy Roman Empire; Personal union with Rietberg (1553–1576, 1584-1600); Personal union with East Frisia (1600-1744)
- Capital: Esens
- Common languages: Harlingerland Frisian (until the 18th century); East Frisian Low Saxon (from the 17th century); German
- Religion: Major: Catholicism (until the 16th century), Lutheranism (from the 16th century); Minor: Catholicism (from the 16th century), Judaism
- Government: Feudal monarchy
- Lords of Esens, Stedesdorf and Wittmund
  - 1455–1473: Sibet Attena (first lord)
  - 1473-1522: Hero Oomkens
  - 1522-1540: Balthasar Oomkens
  - 1540-1559: Onna of Esens
  - 1559-1562: John II of Rietberg
  - 1562-1576: Armgard and Walburgis of Rietberg
  - 1576-1586: Walburgis of Rietberg
  - 1586–1600: Sabina Catharina (last sovereign lady)
  - 1600-1744: Counts and Princes of East Frisia
- Historical era: Middle Ages; Early modern era
  - Occupation of Burg Wittmund: 1455
  - Death of Sibet Attena: 8 November 1473
  - Saxon feud: 1514-1517
  - Status as fief of Guelders: 7 December 1531
  - Death of Balthasar Oomkens: 1540
  - Treaty of Berum: 28 January 1600
  - Incorporation in the County of East Frisia: 25 May 1744
Preceded by	Succeeded by
Harlingerland	Amt Esens; Amt Wittmund
- Today part of: Germany

The Lordships of Esens, Stedesdorf and Wittmund (German: Herrlichkeiten Esens, Wittmund und Stedesdorf) formed a contiguous area in the old district of Harlingerland in the north of the East Frisian peninsula. As in the other areas of East Frisia, the system of the old Frisian freedom in Harlingerland came under increasing pressure due to the rise of the chieftains. In Harlingerland they owned castles in places such as Dornum, Esens, Stedesdorf, Werdum and Wittmund. All these strongholds came one by one into the hands of the powerful chieftain family Attena in the fifteenth century. The first to call himself 'Chieftain of Esens, Stedesdorf and Wittmund' was Sibet Attena in 1455; a loyal follower of Ulrich Cirksena, the later founder of the County of East Frisia. His son, Hero Oomkens, on the other hand, turned away from the Cirksena dynasty and its claims over the entire East Frisian peninsula. A long and bitter struggle followed in which the counts of East Frisia tried in vain to gain control of Harlingerland. It was not until 1600 that Count Enno III of East Frisia succeeded in bringing the lordships of Esens, Stedesdorf and Wittmund within East Frisian influence through the Treaty of Berum of 28 January 1600. However, the area never became fully part of the County of East Frisia: it was only connected to it in a personal union. Thus, the East Frisian estates had no say in the area.

== History ==
=== Unification of the lordships ===
At the end of the fifteenth century, Harlingerland came under the sphere of influence of the chieftain family Tom Brok. In 1414, they appointed the chieftain Wibet of Esens as their vassal in the lordship of Esens. This was ruled from Burg Esens, making Esens the main town of the old Harlingerland. When Wibet turned against the Tom Brok family in the battle for power in East Frisia, his castle in Esens was razed to the ground. Wibet then built a new castle in the southeast of Esens. Wibet had one daughter: Foelke of Esens. She married the chieftain of Stedesdorf: Hero Oomken the elder. This united the lordships of Esens and Stedesdorf for the first time. They had one daughter: Onna of Stedesdorf. She was the heir to the lordship of Stedesdorf. The lordship of Esens, on the other hand, was transferred to the second husband of Foelke of Esens: Ulrich Cirksena. Ulrich in turn transferred the rule over Esens to his loyal vassal and cousin Sibet Attena in 1454. Onna of Stedesdorf married Sibet Attena around 1455. With this, both lordships were once again connected, this time permanently.

The town of Wittmund is located in the east of Harlingerland. There were several castles here, including Kankena Castle, which was originally owned by the chieftain family Kankena. However, Wittmund was strongly influenced by the Tom Brok family. It was only with the downfall of this chieftain family that power in Wittmund was returned to Tanne Kankena by Focko Ukena. However, he was, as a vassal of Focko Ukena, imprisoned by Ulrich Cirksena. After he had renounced several possessions, he was allowed to return to Wittmund. In 1454 he also lost his Burg in Wittmund: Sibet Attena took possession of it. Tanne Kankena was later, in 1461, compensated for this with the Osterburg in Dornum. Through a marriage with Idze Attena he had already come into possession of the Westerbug in Dornum.

Through struggle, marriage politics and ties with the Cirksena dynasty Sibet Attena had succeeded in getting the entire Harlingerland in his hands. In 1455 he called himself 'Lord of Esens, Stedesdorf and Wittmund'.

=== Loyal vassal of East Frisia ===
In the following years, Sibet Attena behaved as an extremely loyal vassal of his cousin Ulrich Cirksena. In 1464 Sibet was present at the ceremonial award of the Imperial County of East Frisia to Ulrich Cirksena in Emden and Sibet Attena was knighted on this occasion. Sibet Attena served as Ulrich Cirksena's most important advisor in the early years of the young county. After Ulrich Cirksena's death in 1466 he supported his widow, Theda Ukena, on condition that the lordships of Esens, Stedesdof and Wittmund would retain their autonomy from the County of East Frisia. Furthermore, Sibet Attena succeeded in obtaining confirmation from the Imperial Court in 1468 of the letter of the granting of the Imperial County of 1464. This secured the inheritance of Ulrich Cirksena's young children Enno, Edzard and Uko. At the end of Sibet Attena's life he attempted to expand his own rule to the east (the Lordship of Jever) and south (the Lordship of Friedeburg). He died on 8 November 1473. A beautiful sarcophagus was erected for him in the church of Esens in honour of his achievements.

=== Bitter enmity with the Cirksena dynasty ===
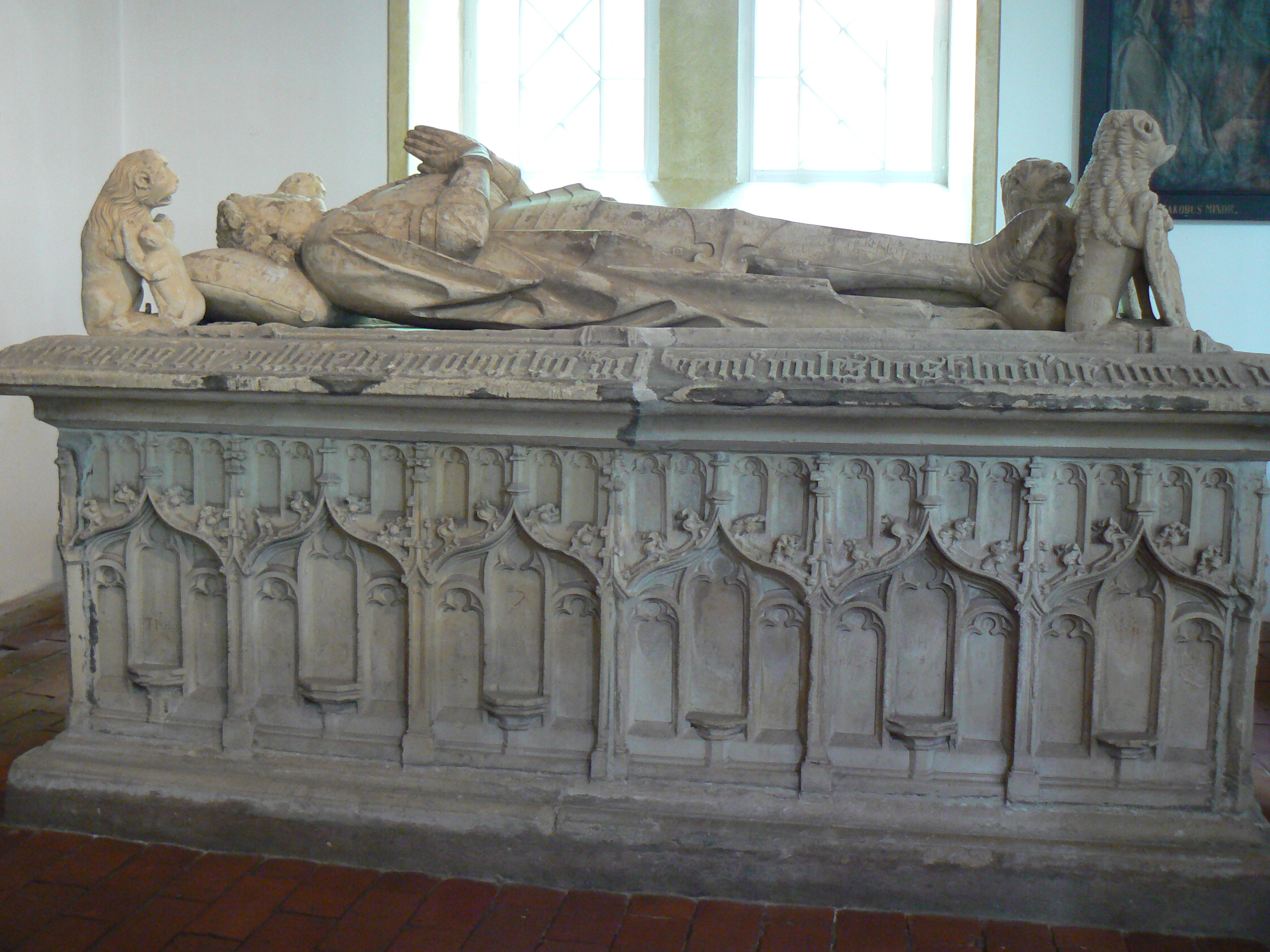
Sarcophagus of Sibet Attena

Sibet Attena was succeeded by his son, Hero Oomkens. Unlike his father, who had been a loyal vassal of the Cirksena dynasty all his life, he developed into a bitter enemy of the East Frisian counts. This was expressed, among other things, by the fact that he named himself after his mother's family name, Oomkens, instead of the dynasty to which his father had belonged: Attena. Hero Oomkens tried fanatically to keep his lordships of Esens, Stedesdorf and Wittmund out of the hands of the East Frisian counts. This was further underlined by his marriage to Irmgard of Oldenburg in 1489, the daughter of Count Gerhard VI of Oldenburg. The Counts of Oldenburg were bitter enemies of East Frisia and this step would have been viewed with suspicion at the East Frisian court. Between 1495 and 1497, Count Edzard I of East Frisia attempted to gain control of the lordships of Esens, Stedesdorf and Wittmund, as well as the Lordship of Jever, through military display of force. However, these military enterprises came to nothing, leaving Harlingerland and Jeverland outside the reach of the Cirksena dynasty. Hero Oomkens was supported by rulers from the region such as the Prince-Bishop of Münster, the County of Oldenburg and the city of Bremen. Moreover, the local populations of Harlingerland and Jeverland felt more loyalty to their local chieftains than to the ideas of Count Edzard I of East Frisia about a united Frisian state that he strove for. Hero Oomkens saw his chance when the Saxon feud broke out in 1514, which was aimed at Count Edzard. Hero seized this opportunity with both hands to severely damage the Cirksena dynasty and thus strengthen and consolidate his own rule in Harlingerland. Together with allies, Hero took the castle in Großsander. The castles in Dornum and the fortress in Stickhausen also fell. In 1517, the war came to an end, after which peace largely returned to the East Frisian peninsula. However, the battle between Hero and Edzard continued. Edzard tried to enforce the claims to the Harlingerland secured by the emperor and plundered the area. However, this was only moderately successful due to the well-developed fortifications of Wittmund and Esens.

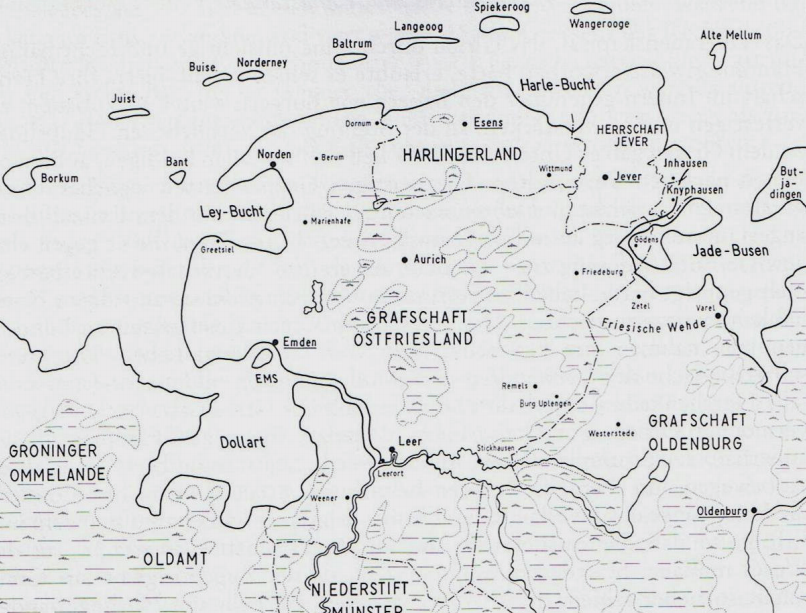
East Frisia in the 16th century

In 1522 Hero Oomkens died. He was succeeded by his son Balthasar Oomkens. The Reformation was in full swing. While the East Frisian counts opted for the new protestant religion, the rulers in Esens, Stedesdorf and Wittmund remained fervent Catholics, although this was more for political considerations than religious ones. Renewed hostilities broke out in 1524 and 1525 when Edzard tried to take Esens, Stedesdorf and Wittmund. The Harlingerland was taken and Balthasar formally submitted to the authority of the East Frisian counts. In the meantime he had made enemies in Bremen by issuing letters of marque aimed at damaging the merchants of that city as much as possible. He was supported in this by the Duchy of Guelders and the Prince-Archbishopric of Bremen. When the last male heir of the lordship of Jever, Christopher of Jever, died in 1517, Balthasar also claimed this area and tried to take it. His rebellion against East Frisia continued, forcing Count Enno II of East Frisia, Edzard's successor, to reoccupy Harlingerland in 1530. Balthasar lost his rule in these areas and fled to his sister Onna of Esens who was married to the ruler of the County of Rietberg. Balthasar submitted to the feudal authority of the Duchy of Guelders in the hope that the duke could restore his authority in Harlingerland. Charles II of Guelders then invaded the County of East Frisia and caused great devastation and suffering in the area; the Gueldrian Feud had broken out. The battle of Jemgum in 1533 was lost and cities such as Leer and Oldersum were plundered and burned. Enno II of East Frisia felt compelled to restore Balthasar to his honour and make far-reaching concessions. With renewed self-confidence, Balthasar began to harass merchant ships from Bremen again in 1537. Attempts at reconciliation were rejected and the imperial authorities decided to impose an Imperial ban on Balthasar in 1538. In the summer of 1540, Balthasar invaded the lordship of Jever once again. Jever and Bremen responded with a counter-reaction and the city of Esens was besieged. During this siege, Balthasar was killed and because he had no male heirs, his territory fell into the hands of the counts of Rietberg.

=== Connected to the county of Rietberg ===
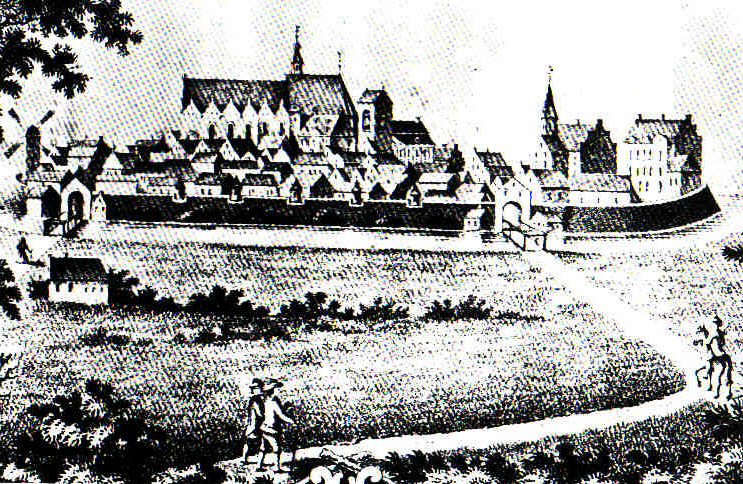
Esens in 1714

Balthasar was succeeded as ruler of Esens, Stedesdorf and Wittmund by his sister Onna of Esens. Onna was married to Count Otto III of Rietberg. Together with her son, count John II of Rietberg, she took over the rule of Esens from her brother. Her first action as ruler was to make peace with the city of Bremen. She too resisted the East Frisian claims on her territory and she did everything she could to strengthen the rule of her son John II. In 1547, they had the city and castle of Esens further fortified. After the childless death of his half-brother, Count Otto IV of Rietberg, John II also took over the rule of Rietberg. Esens, Stedesdorf and Wittmund were from then on connected in a personal union with the county of Rietberg. John II ruled his territory in a tyrannical manner and repeatedly raided the territory of neighbouring countries. In 1556 he conquered a piece of territory in East Frisia. Anna of Oldenburg, the regent of East Frisia, protested strongly but in vain. He also continued to cause problems around his county in Rietberg and more and more rulers rebelled against him. In 1557 the cup was finally full and he was imprisoned by imperial authorities. He died in captivity in Cologne in 1562. He was also the last male heir of his dynasty.

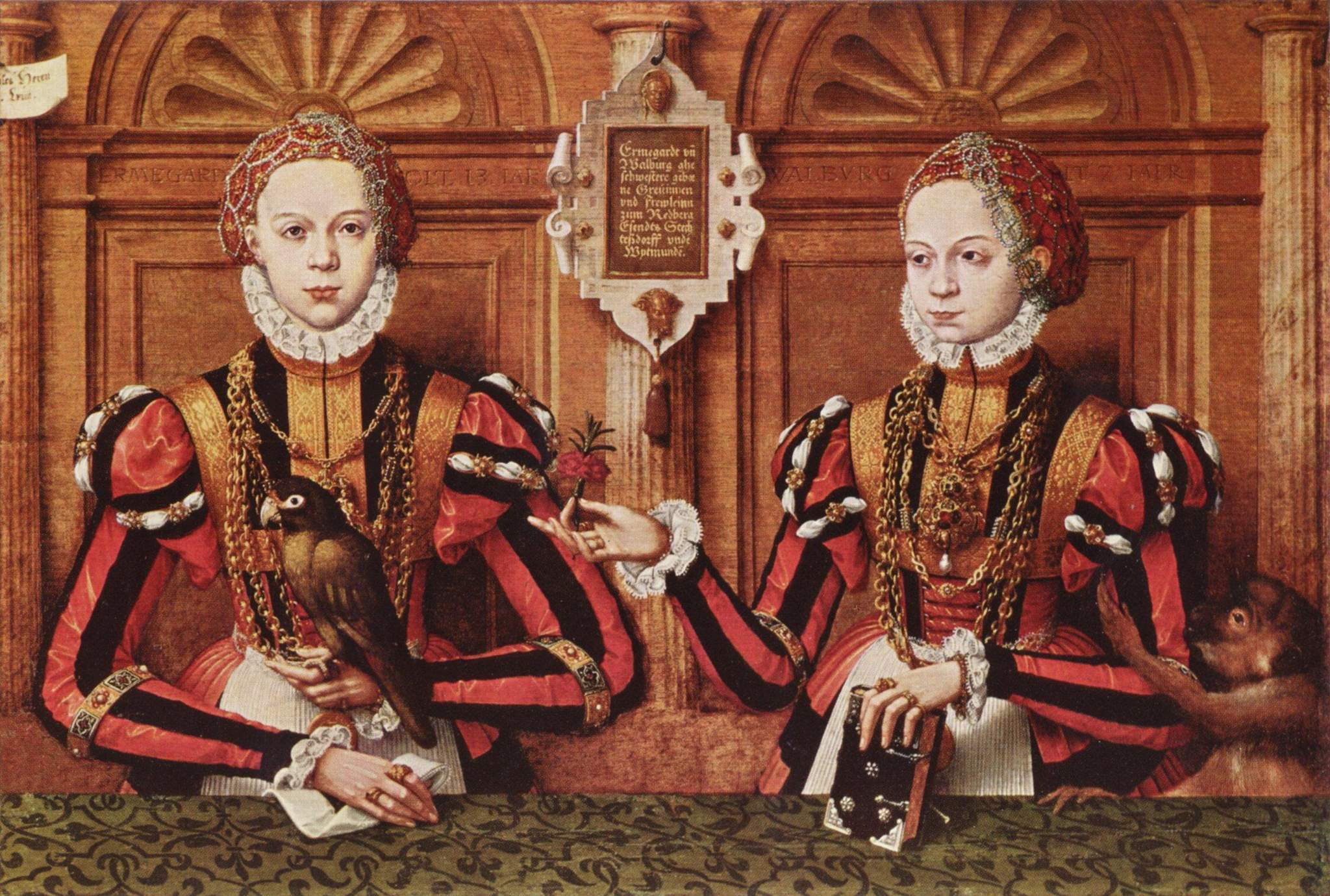
Armgard and Walburgis of Rietberg

He was succeeded by his daughters Armgard and Walburgis. They ruled the county of Rietberg and the lordships of Esens, Stedesdorf and Wittmund jointly, initially under the regency of their mother Agnes of Bentheim-Steinfurt. On 27 September 1576, Armgard and Walburgis divided their inheritance: Armgard received Rietberg while Walburgis received Esens, Stedesdorf and Wittmund. With Walburgis, Harlingerland once again had an independent ruler for a while. However, in 1584, fate struck and Armgard died childless. Walburgis then took over the rule in Rietberg, whereby both areas were once again united in a personal union. Walburgis had married Count Enno III of East Frisia in 1581. Not much later, in 1586, Walburgis also died at a young age.

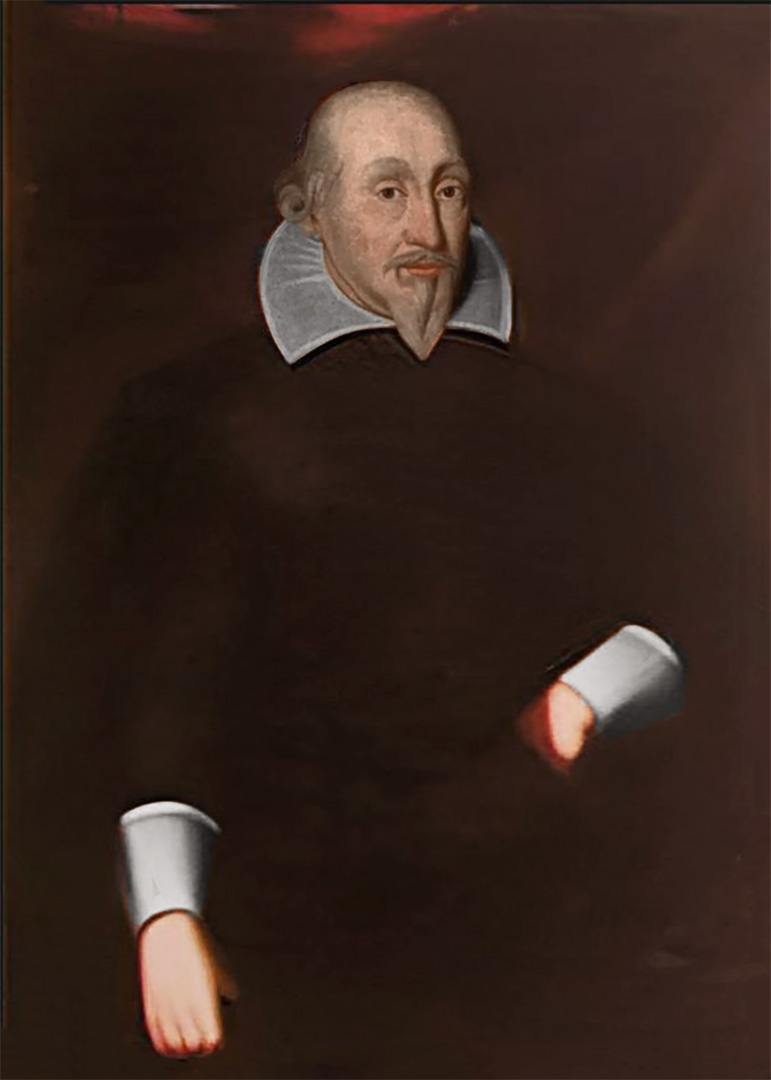
Enno III, Count of East Frisia

Walburgis was succeeded as ruler in Rietberg and Esens, Stedesdorf and Wittmund by her daughter, Sabina Catharina. In order to bind Esens, Stedesdorf and Wittmund to East Frisia once and for all, the Treaty of Berum was drawn up on 28 January 1600. Sabina Catharina and her sister Agnes sold the lordships of Esens, Stedesdorf and Wittmund for 200,000 thalers. This amount was later increased to 300,000 thalers. In doing so, they renounced the Harlingerland in favour of their father Enno III and their half-brother Rudolf Christian. Sabina Catharina would remain the ruler of the County of Rietberg. During the Thirty Years' War, East Frisia would repeatedly fall victim to roving armies looking for an area to winter in. In 1622, Ernst von Mansfeld came to East Frisia. He stole the 300,000 thalers that Enno III had prepared for Agnes and her husband Gundakar of Liechtenstein. This led to a long-lasting struggle between the House of Cirksena and the House of Liechtenstein. In the meantime, Sabina Catharina had married her uncle, John III. As a result, a Catholic cadet branch of the House of Cirksena was founded in Rietberg; the House of Cirksena-Rietberg. They would remain in power in the small county until 1758.

=== In personal union with East Frisia ===
In 1600, Harlingerland was thus permanently bound to East Frisia. However, it would continue to hold a separate position from the county of East Frisia for a long time. The lordships of Esens, Stedesdorf and Wittmund had their own institutions and the powerful States of East Frisia had no say in the area. Harlingerland was governed by its own chancellery and it didn't have a States of its own. Esens became a residence for the Cirksena dynasty, in addition to their court in Aurich. Enno III had to watch helplessly when the hardships of the Thirty Years' War also reached East Frisia. When Ernst von Mansfeld occupied his county, Enno III withdrew with his court to the city of Esens. Enno III's successor, his son Rudolf Christian, underlined the East Frisian rule over Esens, Stedesdorf and Wittmund by incorporating the coats of arms of Esens and Stedesdorf (the bear on a yellow background) and Wittmund (two crossed tournament lances on a blue background) into the coat of arms of East Frisia in 1625.

The 17th century was marked by land reclamation on the Wadden coast. One polder after another was constructed, making fertile land available for economic activity. For example, the centuries-old Harlebucht was reclaimed. This led to conflicts between East Frisia and Oldenburg. In order to prevent further conflict, Christine Charlotte, regent of East Frisia, and Anthony Günter of Oldenburg concluded a border treaty in 1666. Several new villages were founded on the coast in Harlingerland, such as Neuharlingersiel, which made further economic activity possible. The coastal defences were also improved with the construction of new dikes. However, the low-lying Harlingerland remained vulnerable to natural disasters. The Christmas Flood of 1717 caused great devastation in the area.

With the death of Prince Charles Edzard of East Frisia in 1744, the autonomous position of Esens, Stedesdorf and Wittmund also came to an end. Like the rest of East Frisia, the area came into the hands of the Kingdom of Prussia. The new rulers demolished the castle and the fortifications of Esens and in 1745 the chancellery was abolished. In 1748, the mint was moved from Esens to Aurich. Esens, Stedesdorf and Wittmund were henceforth governed from Aurich. This put an end to the special position that the Harlingerland had held within East Frisia for almost 300 years.

== Administrative division ==
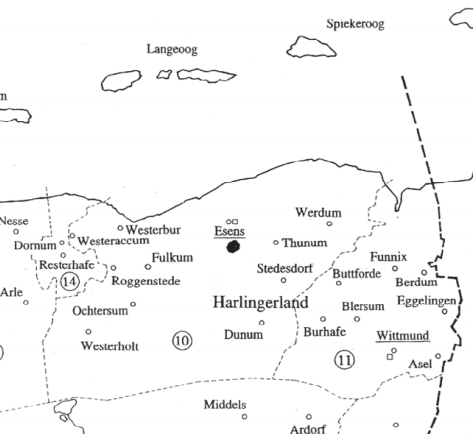
Amt Esens and Amt Wittmund in 1728

Like the rest of East Frisia, Harlingerland was rich in many chieftain castles from which East Frisian chieftain families exercised power over their surroundings. From this, three lordships eventually developed: Esens, Stedesdorf and Wittmund. These were united by Sibet Attena, which meant that Harlingerland was governed by one ruler for the first time. Nevertheless, the three lordships continued to exist as separate entities. When the East Frisian counts took over power in 1600, Harlingerland was faced with an administrative reorganisation. The administrative division that was common in the rest of East Frisia was also introduced in Harlingerland. From then on, Harlingerland was governed from the Amt Esens and the Amt Wittmund.

== Demographics ==
=== Language ===
Originally, a variant of the East Frisian language was spoken in Harlingerland: Harlingerland Frisian. This dialect is usually classified as one of the Weser dialects of East Frisian, although Harlingerland Frisian also showed characteristics of an Ems dialect. Just like in the rest of East Frisia, the Frisian language slowly but surely disappeared in this area. However, the Frisian language survived longer in Harlingerland than in the rest of East Frisia. Around 1600, this variant of Frisian had largely disappeared and the role of lingua franca was taken over by East Frisian Low Saxon. However, the local dialect, which forms the local spoken language for many people, still differs from the East Frisian Low Saxon spoken in the rest of East Frisia. In the eighteenth century, the original East Frisian language became definitively extinct in Harlingerland.

=== Religion ===
Traditionally, Harlingerland was a Catholic area. When the Reformation reached East Frisia, the rulers initially managed to preserve the Catholic character of the area. Although they were sympathetic to the Reformation, they chose to remain faithful to the Catholic faith for political reasons. Religion thus became a political tool against the Lutheran counts of East Frisia. This enabled Balthasar Oomkens to form alliances with powerful neighbours such as the Duke of Guelders and the Prince-Archbishop of Bremen. It was not until 1581 that Harlingerland also converted to the Lutheran faith. 21 pastors from Harlingerland recognised the Lutheran doctrine, after which the area converted to the new faith. In the 18th century, East Frisia fell under the spell of Pietism. A strong advocate of this movement was Prince George Albert of East Frisia and his chancellor Enno Rudolph Brenneysen, who came from Harlingerland. Because the prince had more power in appointing church leaders in Harlingerland, many Pietist church leaders were appointed. The Christmas flood of 1717, which was experienced as a divine judgment, strengthened the status of Pietism as the dominant religious force. Today, Harlingerland is still relatively religious compared to the rest of Germany.

The 17th century also saw the emergence of the first Jewish communities in Harlingerland. In 1637, synagogues were established in Esens and Wittmund. In 1707, the number of Jewish inhabitants in Esens was 73. In 1710, Wittmund had 51 Jewish inhabitants. The Jews were under the direct protection of the counts of East Frisia. This meant that, on the whole, the situation of the Jews in East Frisia was relatively good compared to other areas until 1744.

== See also ==
- Harlingerland
- Treaty of Berum
