= Onna of Esens =

Lady of Harlingerland (1540–1560)

- Lady of Esens, Stedesdorf and Wittmund
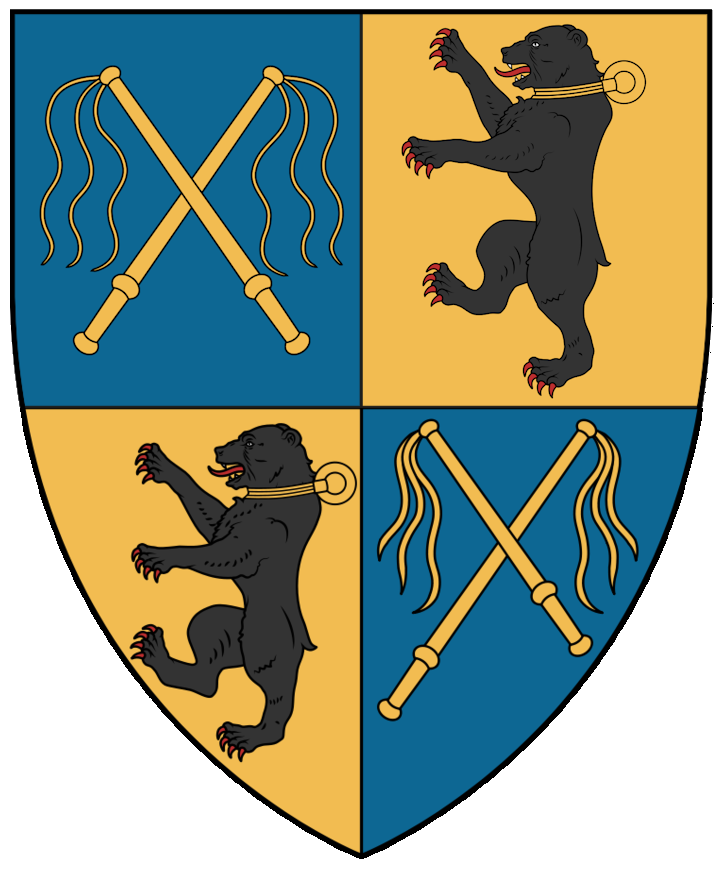
- Coat of Arms of the Attena dynasty

Lady of Esens, Stedesdorf and Wittmund
- Reign: 1540 - 1560
- Predecessor: Balthasar I
- Successor: John II

Countess consort of Rietberg
- Reign: 26 September 1526 – 18 December 1535
- Predecessor: Anna of Sayn
- Successor: Catharine of Zweibrücken; Agnes of Bentheim-Steinfurt
- Born: c. 1498
- Died: 1560
- Spouse: Otto III, Count of Rietberg (m. 1526)
- Issue Detail: John II of Rietberg
- House: Attena-Osterburg
- Father: Hero Oomkens von Esens
- Mother: Irmgard of Oldenburg

Onna of Esens (c. 1498 - 1560) was the daughter of Hero I of Esens, Stedesdorf and Wittmund and Irmgard, Countess of Oldenburg. Following the death of her brother, Balthasar I of Esens, Stedesdorf and Wittmund, in 1540, she became the heiress of the Harlingerland. Through her marriage to Otto III, Count of Rietberg, the Harlingerland passed into the possession of the Counts of Rietberg.

== Biography ==
Nothing is known about her childhood or youth. On 26 September 1523, she became the second wife of Count Otto III of Rietberg. Clause 4 of the marriage contract stipulated that Otto's son from his first marriage, also named Otto IV, was to enter the clergy. The children of Otto and Onna were instead to inherit the County of Rietberg. However, Onna's stepson, Otto IV, was unwilling to renounce his inheritance. After Onna's husband died in 1535, she served as regent on behalf of her son John II and sought to secure his succession to the County of Rietberg. This was prevented by the county's feudal overlords, the Landgraves of Hesse. The succession dispute remained unresolved until Otto IV's death in 1553. In 1548, however, Onna succeeded in obtaining Rietberg as an imperial fief for both brothers after the Landgrave of Hesse, Philip I had been placed under the Imperial Ban for his participation in the Schmalkaldic War and all of his fiefs had been confiscated by the Emperor, Charles V.

In 1540, following the death of her brother Balthasar, Onna and her son Johann also inherited the Harlingerland. She successfully brought the siege of Esens by troops from the City of Bremen to an end and negotiated a peace treaty with the city. Onna and Johann subsequently received the Harlingerland as a fief from Bremen on 7 December 1540. In doing so, she firmly rejected all claims made by East Frisia. She appears to have left the day-to-day government to her son. John II of Rietberg, however, soon proved to be unjust towards his subjects and predatory towards his neighbours. He was placed under the Imperial Ban and died in captivity. According to Ubbo Emmius and Ulrich von Werdum, it was Onna who encouraged her son in these actions, and they portrayed her as chiefly responsible for the later conflicts in the Harlingerland, although this cannot be substantiated by documentary evidence. Nevertheless, she took every opportunity to secure her son's rule. When Emperor Charles V annexed the Duchy of Guelders, he declared the treaty with Bremen invalid and restored in 1547 the feudal relationship with Guelders that had previously been established by Balthasar. As a result, the Harlingerland effectively became an imperial fief, and Johann no longer had to fear outside interference. Onna herself appears to have taken no further part in government until Johann was imprisoned by the Lower Rhenish–Westphalian Imperial Circle in 1557.

At that point, she undertook various efforts to support her son. She unsuccessfully attempted to recruit troops from Brunswick and later, also without success, sought the support of the King of Spain. She spent the remainder of her life campaigning for her son's release. She was last mentioned in documentary sources in December 1559 and is presumed to have died shortly thereafter. Overall, Onna appears above all as a determined mother who devoted all her efforts to her son. To that extent, it may be true that she was not entirely blameless for the later course of her son Johann's life. In East Frisian historiography, however, she has been portrayed, much like the medieval "Wicked" Foelke, as the instigator of her son's criminal acts, a characterization that is likely to be greatly exaggerated.

== Marriage and issue ==
Onna of Esens married on 26 September 1526 Otto III of Rietberg. He was the son of John I of Rietberg and Margaret of Lippe. Via this marriage, the Counts of Rietberg acquired the Harlingerland.

Onna had one child with Otto:

- John II (died 1562), Count of Rietberg from 1553 to 1562. He was the last Count from the House of Rietberg; after his death, the title went to a junior line of the Cirksena family.

== See also ==
- House of Attena
- Harlingerland
- Lordships of Esens, Stedesdorf and Wittmund
- Lords of Esens, Stedesdorf and Wittmund
- County of Rietberg
