= John II of Rietberg =

John II
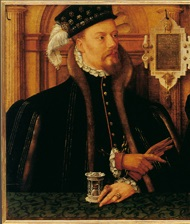
- John II, Count of Rietberg

Count of Rietberg
- Reign: 18 December 1535 - 11 December 1562
- Predecessor: Otto III
- Successor: Agnes of Bentheim-Steinfurt (as regent)
- Alongside: Otto IV (1535–1553)

Lord of Esens, Stedesdorf and Wittmund
- Reign: 1560 - 11 December 1562
- Predecessor: Onna of Esens
- Successor: Agnes of Bentheim-Steinfurt (as regent)
- Born: after 1523
- Died: 11 December 1562; Cologne
- Burial: Cologne
- Spouse: Agnes of Bentheim-Steinfurt
- Issue: Armgard of Rietberg; Walburgis of Rietberg
- House: Werl-Arnsberg-Cuyk
- Father: Otto III, Count of Rietberg
- Mother: Onna of Esens

Count John II "the Mad" of Rietberg (after 1523 – 11 December 1562 in Cologne), called "the Great," was the son of Count Otto III of Rietberg and his second wife, Onna of Esens.

After his uncle Balthasar Oomkens von Esens died in 1540 without a male heir, John and his mother inherited the East Frisian Lordships of Esens, Stedesdorf and Wittmund and John assumed the title of Lord of Esens, Stedesdorf and Wittmund.

When his father died in 1535, John had to share the County of Rietberg with his older half-brother Otto IV. After Otto IV died childless in 1553, John II ruled Rietberg alone.

In 1556, John illegally beheaded one of his own officials in Rietberg and schemed against the victim's relatives who had profited from the official's misbehaviour. The relatives fled to the neighbouring County of Lippe. From there, they and a few faithful raided Rietberg. John then moved his mercenaries from Esens to Rietberg and attacked Count Bernhard VIII of Lippe. The army of Lippe responded by laying siege to the town of Rietberg. The Bishopric of Paderborn joined the attack on Rietberg. Lippe, Paderborn and East Frisia also sued each other in the court of the Lower Rhenish-Westphalian Circle. The Court found John guilty of a breach of the peace.

John refused to give in. Imperial troops joined the siege of Rietberg and in June 1557, the city was starved and had to capitulate. John was taken prisoner. Initially, he was held at the Imperial castle at Büderich (near Wesel); in 1560, he was transferred to Cologne, where he died in captivity in 1562 and was buried.

His pugnacity and power struggles earned him he nickname "John the Mad".

== Marriage and issue ==
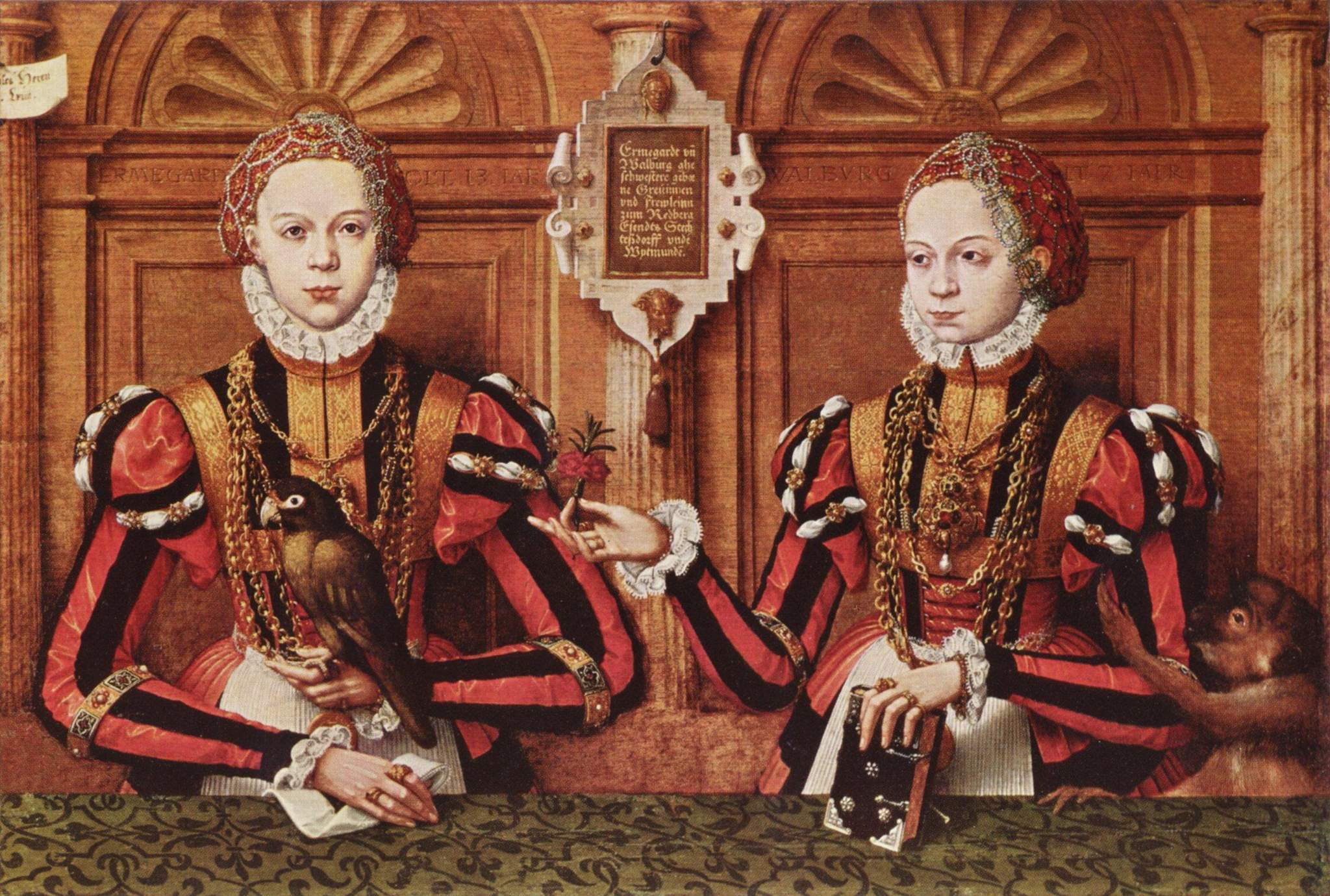
Armgard and Walburgis of Rietberg, detail of a family portrait by Hermann tom Ring

John married Countess Agnes of Bentheim-Steinfurt. They had two daughters:

- Armgard (died: 1584), Countess of Rietberg, married: Count Simon VI of Lippe
- Walburgis (born: c. 1557 in Rietberg – died: 26 May 1586 in Esens), Countess of Harlingerland, married Count Enno III of East Frisia

John II was thus the last male ruler of Rietberg from the Werl-Arnsberg-Cuyk family. After his death, his widow acted as regent for his daughters until 1557, when the inheritance was divided: Armgard received Rietberg and Walburgis received the Harlingerland.

John II of Rietberg Werl-Arnsberg-Cuyk Born: c. 1557 Died: 26 May 1587
Preceded by Otto III	Count of Rietberg; 1535–1562	Succeeded by Armgard
