= Lords of Esens, Stedesdorf and Wittmund =

Lord of Esens, Stedesdorf and Wittmund
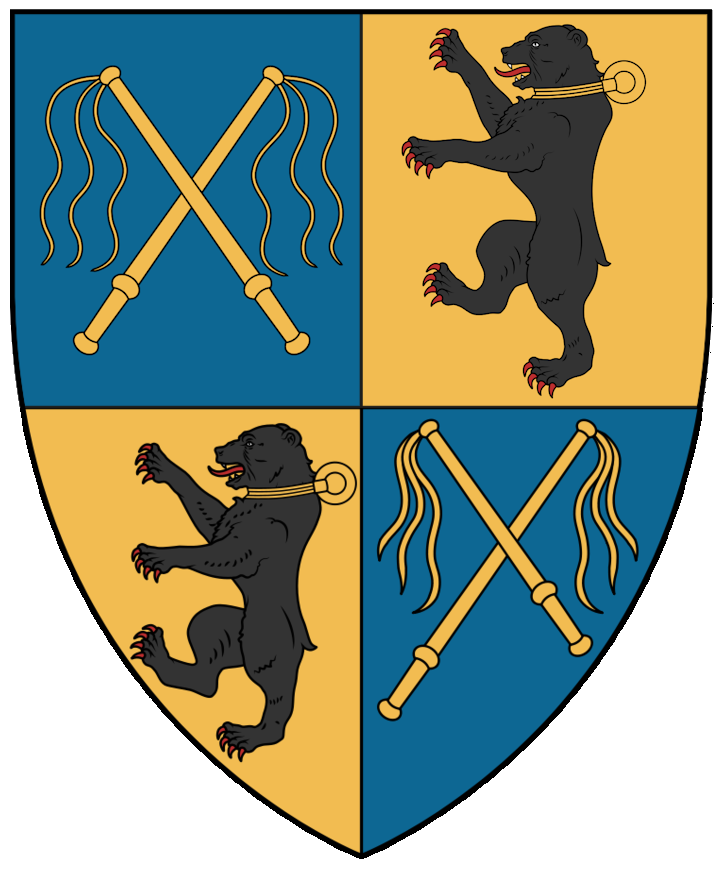

Details
- First monarch: Sibet
- Last monarch: Charles Edzard
- Formation: 1455
- Abolition: 25 May 1744
- Residence: Burg Esens

The Lordships of Esens, Stedesdorf and Wittmund were united in 1455 when Sibet Attena, a loyal vassal of the future Count of East Frisia, Ulrich I, married Onna of Stedesdorf; the heiress of the Lordship of Stedesdorf. The year before, Sibet Attena had captured the castle of Tanne Kankena in Wittmund. Finally, in 1454, Sibet Attena also received the Lordship of Esens as a fief from Ulrich I. This gave him control over the entire Harlingerland. Sibet Attena was a scion of the powerful Attena family, an East Frisian chieftain family who owned many properties in the north of the East Frisian peninsula. After his marriage to Onna of Stedesdorf in 1455 he called himself Lord of Esens, Stedesdorf and Wittmund.

Sibet Attena had been a loyal vassal of the Cirksena dynasty until his death in 1473. He supported Countess Theda Ukena on the condition that his own territory would remain relatively autonomous. However, his son, Hero Oomkens, turned away from the Cirksenas and established himself as independent ruler of the Lordships of Esens, Stedesdorf and Wittmund. When the rule of the Attena dynasty in the Harlingerland ended in male descent with the death of Balthasar Oomkens in 1540, the rule passed to his sister Onna of Esens. She was married to Otto III of Rietberg. As a result, Harlingerland came into the hands of the Werl-Arnsberg-Cuyk dynasty that ruled over the County of Rietberg. Esens, Stedesdorf and Wittmund were inherited again through the female line with the death of John II in 1562. The sisters Armgard and Walburgis took over the rule.

Walburgis married Enno III of East Frisia. Their daughter, and the heir of Harlingerland, Sabina Catharina of East Frisia, ceded the rule of Harlingerland to the Cirksena dynasty on 28 January 1600 through the Treaty of Berum. This connected the Lordships of Esens, Stedesdorf and Wittmund to the County of East Frisia once and for all. However, it remained a separate entity and the Counts and Princes of East Frisia were from then on also known as the 'Lords of Esens, Stedesdorf and Wittmund'. With the takeover of East Frisia by Prussia, the independent position of Esens, Stedesdorf and Wittmund came to an end. The area was governed from Aurich from 1744.

== List of Lords of Esens, Stedesdorf and Wittmund ==
=== House of Attena ===
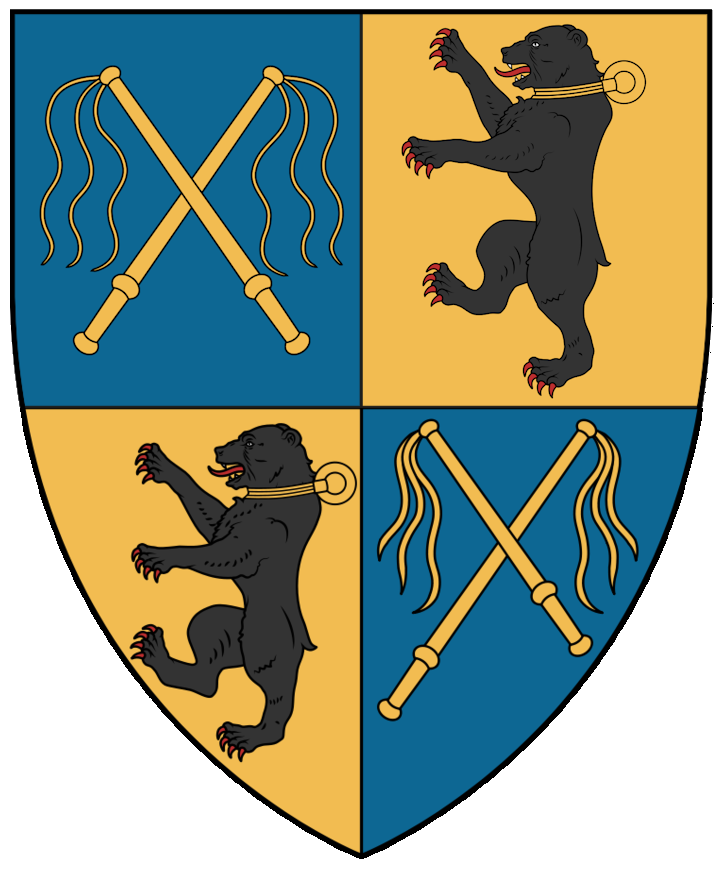

- 1455-1473: Sibet I
- 1473-1522: Hero I (son of)
- 1522-1540: Balthasar I (son of)
- 1540-1560: Onna of Esens (sister of, married to Otto III, Count of Rietberg)

=== House of Werl-Arnsberg-Cuyk ===
- 1560-1562: John I (son of, also Count of Rietberg as John II)
- 1562-1576: Armgard and Walburgis (daughters of, also Countesses of Rietberg)
- 1576-1586: Walburgis (as sole ruler, also Countesses of Rietberg from 1584-1586. Married to Enno III, Count of East Frisia)

=== House of Cirksena ===
- 1586-1600: Sabina Catharina and Agnes (daughters of, also Countesses of Rietberg)
- 1600-1625: Enno III (following the Treaty of Berum)
- 1625-1628: Rudolf Christian (son of)
- 1628-1648: Ulrich II (brother of)
- 1648-1651: Juliana (as regent, married to Ulrich II, Count of East Frisia
- 1651-1660: Enno Louis (son of)
- 1660-1665: George Christian (brother of)
- 1665-1690: Christine Charlotte (as regent, married to George Christian, Prince of East Frisia)
- 1690-1708: Christian Everhard (son of)
- 1708-1734: George Albert (son of)
- 1734-1744: Charles Edzard (son of)

== See also ==
- Lordships of Esens, Stedesdorf and Wittmund
- County of East Frisia
- List of counts of East Frisia
