= East Frisian-Gueldrian War =

East Frisian-Gueldrian War (1531–1534)
- Part of Guelders Wars
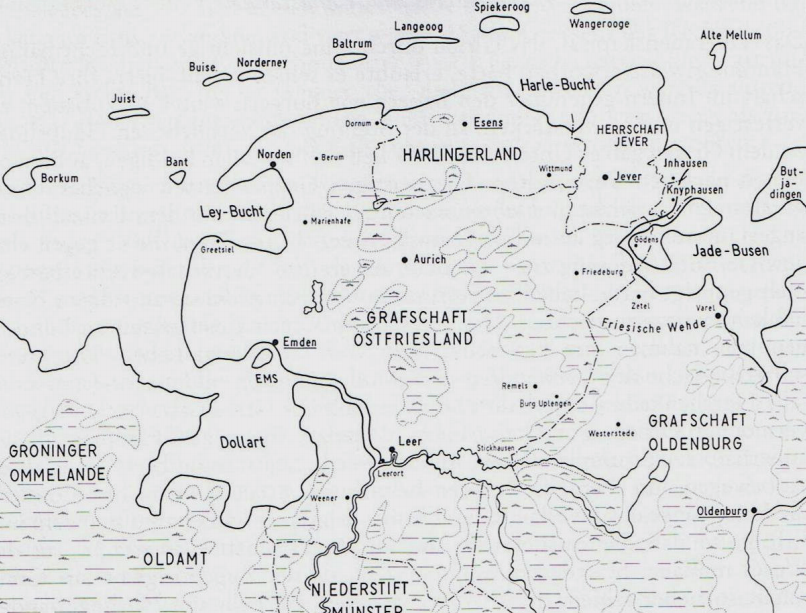
- East Frisia in the 16th century
| Date | 1531–1534 |
| Location | County of East Frisia; Lordships of Esens, Stedesdorf and Wittmund |
| Result | Peace of Logum |
| Territorial changes | Lord Balthasar of Esens, Stedesdorf and Wittmund regains his rule in Harlingerland |

Belligerents
| County of East Frisia | Duchy of Guelders; Lordships of Esens, Stedesdorf and Wittmund |

Commanders and leaders
| Enno II of East Frisia; Johan I of East Frisia | Charles II of Guelders; Meinhart von Hamme; Berend van Hackfort; Maarten van Rossum; Balthasar I of Esens, Stedesdorf and Wittmund |

Strength
| Unknown | Unknown |

Casualties and losses
| Unknown | Unknown |

The East Frisian-Gueldrian War of 1531–1534, also known as the Gueldrian Feud, was a conflict between Counts Enno II and Johan I of East Frisia on the one hand, and Balthasar von Esens and Duke Charles II of Guelders on the other. In this war, which lasted from 1531 to 1534, East Frisia suffered severe devastation. The war came to an end in 1534 with the Peace of Logum.

== Background ==
The Counts of East Frisia from the House of Cirksena had been having problems with Lord Balthasar von Esens, the Lord of Esens, Stedesdorf and Wittmund, for some time. In 1530, Enno II marched to Esens, defeated Balthasar, and forced him into a humiliating peace. Enno II took away a large part of his former territory, including Wittmund, Westerholt, Ochtersum, Dunum, and Werdum. Balthasar was also forced to accept Enno as his feudal lord and beg on his knees for the signing of a treaty. Balthasar plotted revenge. In 1531, he found help from the Catholic Duke Charles of Guelders, who was not well-disposed towards the Counts of East Frisia because the Reformation had been introduced in East Frisia under Enno's father, Edzard I of East Frisia.

== The War ==
In 1531, Balthasar's troops invaded East Frisia and devastated the country. During the campaign, Balthasar destroyed several important buildings in Norden, as well as the monasteries of Mariental, Appingen, Sielmönken, and Dykhusen. Maria of Jever seized the opportunity and expelled the East Frisian occupation from the Jeverland.

The Mariental Monastery in Norden deserves special mention. The Cirksena family crypt was located there until its destruction by Balthasar. It was then moved to the Great Church of Emden, which now houses the Johannes a Lasco Library. The tomb of Enno II can still be seen there today.

Count John, Count Enno's Catholic brother, also took rich plunder during a retaliatory campaign in Harlingerland, plundering and murdering just like Balthasar had done in East Frisia. However, Balthasar had made enough loot in East Frisia to repair his homeland, while the Counts of East Frisia were left to bear most of the damage.

Balthasar eventually subordinated the Lordships of Esens, Stedesdorf and Wittmund the feudal sovereignty of Guelders and, with the strong duke at his back, continued to build up his forces. In 1533, the troops of Duke Charles of Guelders and Balthasar of Esens, led by the notorious mercenary leader Meinhart von Hamme, marched into the Rheiderland with 2,000 men. Initially, Enno was able to stand up to the army at the Dieler Sconce and drive them out of the country. However, a second attempt by Meinhard von Hamme was successful. He marched hastily and stealthily across the Rheiderland and entrenched himself in the fortified church of Jemgum.

On October 14, 1533, the Battle of Jemgum took place. There, the count's troops acted so tactically ineptly that their numerically superior troops were shot down and driven into a wild flight. Although only a relatively small number of 400 men lost their lives, the East Frisian victims included numerous noblemen who had ridden at the head of their army. As a result of the battle, Coldeborg was captured, and Leer and Oldersum were plundered and set on fire.

Although von Hamme withdrew from East Frisia afterward, he returned a few weeks later with reinforcements from Guelders and continued the campaign. In 1534, Albert von Bakemoor was forced to surrender Greetsiel, the ancestral castle of the Cirksena family, to Balthasar von Esens. Enno II had lost the feud and was forced to conclude peace.

== The Peace of Logum ==
In 1534, Enno II concluded a peace treaty in Logum with Charles of Guelders, Balthasar's feudal lord. Balthasar regained the dominion of Esens, Stedesdorf and Wittmund. The peace of 1530 was thus revised. Furthermore, Enno pledged to pay 12,000 Emden guilders in four annual installments to cover the war costs incurred by the Duke of Guelders.

== Aftermath ==
Large parts of East Frisia were devastated by the chaos of the Saxon feud and the Guelderian Feud. Count Enno II had learned from his defeat and remained cautious in the following period. In 1537, however, Balthasar, drunk with victory, began a conflict with the Free Hanseatic City of Bremen by issuing letters of marque. Bremen then obtained the imposition of the Imperial ban on Balthasar, which was pronounced on June 21, 1538. In July 1540, the Bremen laid siege to Esens, supported by Maria of Jever. Balthasar died of illness on October 18, 1540, during the siege. Shortly thereafter, the fighting ended, and later that year, mediated by the Landgrave Philip I of Hesse, a peace treaty was concluded with Bremen, in which Balthasar's sister was appointed the new regent of the Harlingerland under the feudal sovereignty of Bremen.

== See also ==
- East Frisia
- County of East Frisia
- East Frisia (peninsula)
- History of East Frisia
- Lordships of Esens, Stedesdorf and Wittmund
- Duchy of Guelders
- Guelders Wars

== Literature ==
- Karl-Ernst Behre, Hajo van Lengen (Hrsg.): Ostfriesland. Geschichte und Gestalt einer Kulturlandschaft. Ostfriesische Landschaft, Aurich 1995, ISBN 3-925365-85-0.
- Eckart Kroemer, Heino Schmidt, Hajo van Lengen: Ostfriesland (= Landschaften Niedersachsens und ihre Probleme. Bd. 5, ZDB-ID 585200-6). Niedersächsische Landeszentrale für Politische Bildung, Hannover 1987.
