= Maximilian Ulrich von Kaunitz =

Governor of Moravia (1679–1746)

Maximilian Ulrich von Kaunitz-Rietberg
- Maxmilián Oldřich z Kounic-Rietbergu
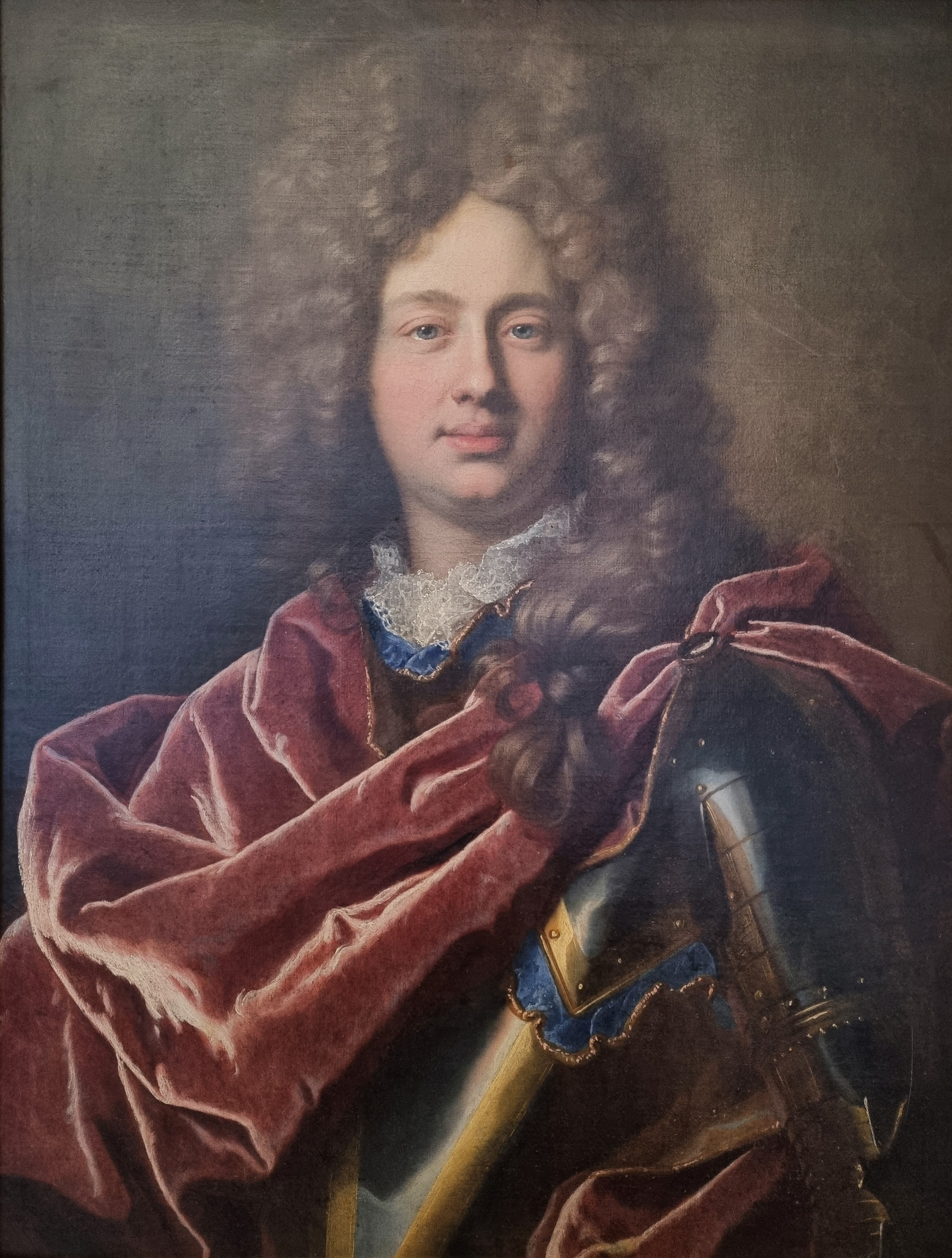
- Portrait from 1698 by Hyacinthe Rigaud
- Born: March 27, 1679. Vienna, Archduchy of Austria, Holy Roman Empire
- Died: September 10, 1746 (aged 67); Vienna, Archduchy of Austria, Holy Roman Empire
- Title: Governor of Moravia
- Term: 1721–1746
- Spouse: Maria Ernestina Franziska von Cirksena-Rietberg (m. 1699)
- Children: 16, including Wenzel Anton, Prince of Kaunitz-Rietberg
- Honours: Knight of the Golden Fleece

Count Maximilian Ulrich von Kaunitz-Rietberg (Czech: Maxmilián Oldřich z Kounic-Rietbergu; 27 March 1679 – 10 September 1746) was an Austrian diplomat and politician who served as governor of Moravia from 1720 until his death. He was the father of the powerful state chancellor of Maria Theresa, Holy Roman Empress and Queen Regnant of Bohemia and Hungary, Wenzel Anton, Prince of Kaunitz-Rietberg.

== Early life ==
Maximilian Ulrich was born in Vienna to a wealthy Moravian noble family as the third son of Count Dominik Andreas I von Kaunitz (1655–1705), Baron of Šlapanice and Countess Maria Eleonora von Sternberg (died 2 December 1706), daughter of Count Adolph of Sternberg, the Supreme Burgrave of Bohemia. He was appointed an imperial chamberlain at a young age, and in 1706, he was made an imperial councillor.

== Career ==
At least from the summer of 1716, Maximilian Ulrich was active as imperial envoy to various German princely courts. On 21 September 1720, he was named geheimrat, imperial secret councillor. In 1721, he served as imperial ambassador to Rome, witnessing the papal conclave that elected Benedict XIII after the death of Innocent XIII. In the same year he returned to the place of origin of his family, Moravia, becoming its governor.

He laid claim to the ancestral lands of his wife, the County of Rietberg, fighting a long and costly legal battle against the princely family of Liechtenstein and the king of Prussia. After he had won the suit in 1718, he changed the name of his family to 'Kaunitz-Rietberg' and was admitted to the Lower Rhine-Westphalian Imperial College of Counts. As part of the Rietberg inheritance, he and his descendants also assumed the lordship of Esens, Stederdorf, and Wittmund in East Frisia, despite these lands being under Prussian occupation.

=== Governor of Moravia ===
Maximilian Ulrich was a devoted governor who established and oversaw many beneficial and charitable institutions, among them the State Academy of Olomouc. He worked on making the river Morava navigable and had a road built between Brno and Olomouc; he regularised the tax system of Moravia, increasing royal income and enacted a partial reform of the provincial administration. He also introduced restrictions on the lives of the significant Jewish population of the region and ordered the expulsion of Romani people.

== Personal life ==
On 6 August 1699, he married Prinzess Maria Ernestina Franziska von Cirksena-Rietberg (1683/1686–1758), heiress of the House of Cirksena as the only child of Ferdinand Maximilian von Ostfriesland-Rietberg, Count of Rietberg and Countess Johanna Franziska von Manderscheid-Blankenheim. One source claims that the two had been betrothed in 1697 and that Maria was fourteen and Maximilian Ulrich seventeen, while another states that the groom was twenty and the bride thirteen at the time of their wedding. Maximilain Ulrich died in Vienna in 1746, aged sixty-seven.

== Issue ==
From his marriage, Maximilian Ulrich had sixteen children, eleven sons and five daughters:

- Maria Johanna Franziska (born 1704);
- Dominika Josepha (1705–1736);
- Maria Josepha Agnes (18 May 1706 – 7 December 1726);
- Maria Antonia Josepha Justine (15 June 1708 – 14 July 1778), who married Count Johann Adam von Questenberg in 1738 and had no issue, naming named their nephew Dominik Andreas II as their heir, thus founding the line of Kaunitz-Rietberg-Questenberg;
- Johann Dominik I (23 February 1709 – 1751);
- Wenzel Anton, Prince of Kaunitz-Rietberg (2 February 1711 – 27 June 1794), state chancellor to Maria Theresa from 1753 and prince of the Holy Roman Empire from 1764. On 6 May 1736, he married Countess Maria Ernestine von Starhemberg and had issue, among them Dominik Andreas II from whom the Kaunitz-Rietberg-Questenbergs descend;
- Maximilian Joseph (1712–1736);
- Franz Leopold (born 1713, died young);
- Johann Wilhelm (born 1713, died young);
- Franz Thaddäus (1714–1722);
- Karl Joseph (26 December 1715 – 31 March 1737);
- Emanuel Joseph (9 September 1717 – 10 May 1727);
- Ludwig Joseph (4 September 1720 – 12 March 1745);
- Maria Eleonore (8 April 1723 – 7 May 1776), married Count Rudolph Pálffy;
- Johann Joseph Alois (21 June 1726 – 10 March 1743);
- Rudolph Joseph (1727–1728).

== Honours ==
- Holy Roman Empire: Knight of the Golden Fleece (1744)

Political offices
Preceded by Dominik Andreas I von Kaunitz	Baron of Šlapanice; 1705–1746	Succeeded by Wenzel Anton, Prince of Kaunitz-Rietberg
