= Otto III of Rietberg =

Otto III

Count of Rietberg
- Reign: 1516 - 18 December 1535
- Predecessor: John I
- Successor: Otto IV; John II
- Born: between 1475 and 1485
- Died: 18 December 1535
- Burial: Marienfeld Abbey
- Spouse: Anna of Sayn; Onna of Esens
- Issue Detail: Otto IV; John II
- House: Werl-Arnsberg-Cuyk
- Father: John I, Count of Rietberg
- Mother: Margaret of Lippe

Count Otto III Rietberg (between 1475 and 1485 – 18 December 1535) was Count of Rietberg from 1516 to 1535.

Otto III was probably born between 1475 and 1485 as the eldest son of John I and his wife Margaret of Lippe.

Otto's second wife, Onna of Esens, introduced the Reformation in the County of Rietberg. In 1533, Otto III appointed two preachers from Lippe, to teach the new faith in the parishes of Rietberg and Neuenkirchen.

Otto III suffered from ulcers on his leg. He died on 18 December 1535 and was buried in the Marienfeld Abbey. He was the last Count of Rietberg to be buried there. On his gravestone in the cloister before the winter refectory a Latin text could be read:

In the year of our Lord 1535, on 18 December, died
Noble Lord Otto, Count and Lord of Rietberg.
May his soul rest in peace.

Beside it was the grave stone of his first wife:

In the year of our Lord 1523, the day before St. Anthony, died
Anna of Sayn, Countess in Rietberg.
May her soul may in peace.

== Marriages and issue ==
Otto III's first marriage, which was closed before 1515, was with Countess Anna of Sayn (died: 16 January 1523). With her he had five children:

- Otto IV (died 1553), married on 1 February 1541 Countess Palatine Catherine of the Rhine, died childless
- Johanna (died: 25 June 1578), abbess of Metelen Abbey and deaness of Herford Abbey
- Ursula, married on 4 March 1538 with Philip, Lord of Winneburg and Beilstein. A dowry of 6000 gold florins was paid.
- Ermgart (died: 17 September 1579), abbess of Vreden Abbey and Metelen Abbey
- Conrad (died before 1523)

After Anna's death, Otto III married on 26 September 1526 Onna of Esens (died after 1559). She was the daughter of Hero Oomkens von Esens, an East Frisian chieftain, and the sister of Balthasar Oomkens von Esens of the House of Attena. Via this marriage, the Counts of Rietberg acquired the Harlingerland. In 1526, it was held by Onna's brother Balthasar. Five years after Otto's death, Balthasar died childless and Onna inherited his land.

Otto had one child with Onna:

- John II (d. 1562), Count of Rietberg from 1553 to 1562. He was the last Count from the House of Rietberg; after his death, the title went to a junior line of the Cirksena family.

Otto III had an illegitimate daughter with Jutte, who later married John of Willen, the Seneschal of the County of Rietberg:

- Anna

Otto III of Rietberg House of Rietberg Born: between 1475 and 1485 Died: 18 December 1535
Preceded by John I	Count of Rietberg; 1516–1535	Succeeded by Otto IV; John II
