= Sibet Attena =

Lord of Harlingerland (1455-1473)

Sibet I
- Lord of Esens, Stedesdorf and Wittmund
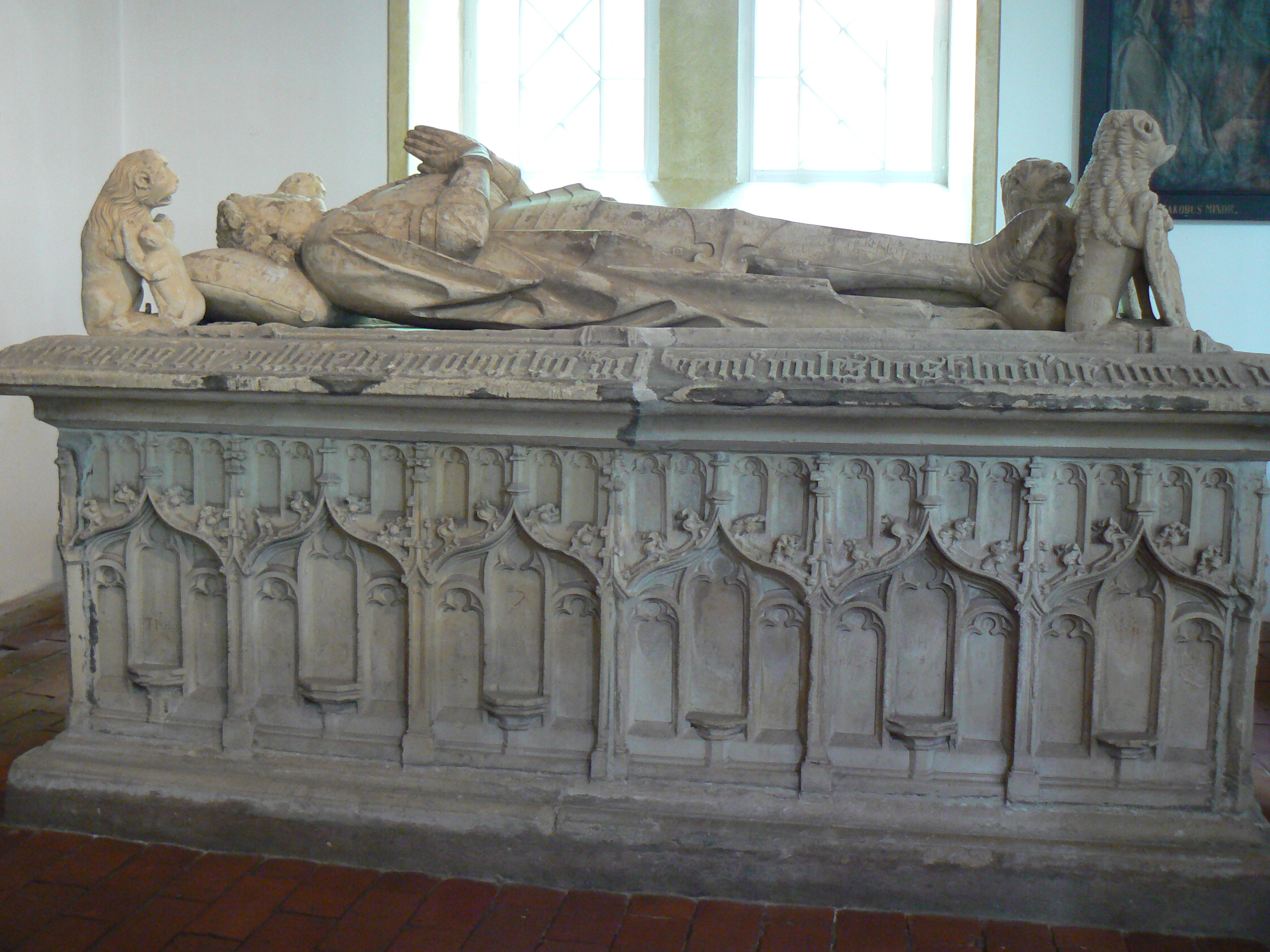
- Sarcophagus of Sibet Attena in the St. Magnus Church in Esens

Lord of Esens, Stedesdorf and Wittmund
- Reign: 1455 - 8 November 1473
- Predecessor: new creation
- Successor: Hero I
- Born: c. 1425
- Died: 8 November 1473; Emden
- Burial: St. Magnus Church in Esens
- Spouse: Onna of Stedesdorf; Margaret of Westerwolde
- House: Attena-Osterburg
- Father: Sibet of Dornum
- Mother: Frouwa of Manslagt

Sibet Attena (also: Latin: Sibo; c. 1425 – 8 November 1473) was an East Frisian chieftain. He was a son of Sibet of Dornum ("old Sibet") (d. 1433) and Frouwa of Manslagt, a daughter of Enno Cirksena.

From his father he inherited the Beninga Castle in Dornum. From his first wife, Onna of Stedesdorf, a daughter of Hero Omken the Elder, he inherited Stedesdorf in 1447. As a nephew and a loyal supporter of Ulrich Cirksena, he was invested with Esens in 1454. He was also to inherit Manslagt via his mother, but he renounced this.

Also in 1454, he supported Ulrich Cirksena against Tanne Kankena in Wittmund. He occupied Kankena's castle in Wittmund and expelled him. Seven years later he invested Kankena with Dornum. From 1455, he called himself "Chieftain at Esens, Stedesdorf and Wittmund". Thus, he viewed himself as the ruler of the Lordships of Esens, Stedesdorf and Wittmund.

After Onna of Stedesdorf died in 1464, he married his second wife Margaret of Westerwolde.

Sibet was present in 1464 at the solemn ceremony in the Guesthouse Church in Emden where Ulrich Cirksena was raised to Imperial Count and was knighted during that ceremony.

After his death, a magnificent sandstone sarcophagus was erected for him in the church of Esens (now the St. Magnus Church) in 1473.

== Issue ==
Children from his first marriage:

- Wibet, married with Tyader of Jever (no issue)
- Hero Omken the Younger, married to Armgard, Duchess of Oldenburg and had issue
- Frouwa, married with Edo Wiemken the Younger, chieftain of Jever (no issue)

Children from his second marriage:

- Ulrich von Dornum, married Essa of Oldersum (no issue) and secondly, Hyma of Grimersum
- Sibo (no issue)
