= Ulrich von Dornum =

Lord of Oldersum (1466–1536)

Ulrich I
- Lord of Dornum-Westerburg
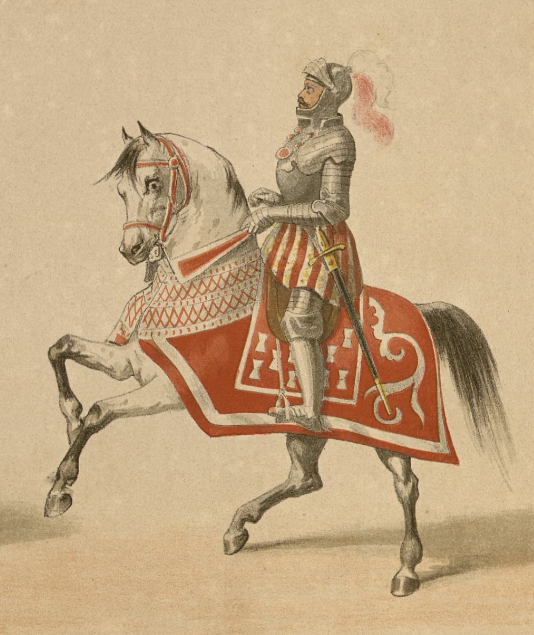
- Ulrich I, Lord of Oldersum

Lord of Dornum-Westerburg
- Reign: 1473 - 1481
- Predecessor: Sibet Attena
- Successor: Hicko Mauritz Kankena; Hero Mauritz Kankena

Lord of Oldersum
- Reign: 1494 – 12 March 1536
- Predecessor: Essa von Oldersum
- Successor: Hero I Boing I
- Alongside: Essa
- Born: 1465/1466
- Died: 14 March 1536; Oldersum
- Spouse: Essa von Oldersum; Hyma von Grimersum
- House: Attena-Osterburg
- Father: Sibet Attena
- Mother: Margarete von Westerwolde

Ulrich von Dornum (1465/66 - 12 March 1536) was a son of the East Frisian chieftain Sibet Attena and his second wife Margarete von Westerwolde.

Through his marriage to Essa von Oldersum in 1494, Ulrich von Dornum became lord of half of the Lordship of Oldersum, as well as of Jarßum and Widdelswehr. His inheritance in Harlingerland, which his father had left in his will, was withheld from him by his older half brother Hero Oomkens. His wife Essa von Oldersum died in 1515. Since their marriage had remained childless, her inheritance reverted to the House of Oldersum after the death of Ulrich. Ulrich married for a second time, this time with Hyma von Grimersum in 1519.

Initially, Ulrich of Dornum, like his half-brother Hero Oomkens, was hostile to Count Edzard I of East Frisia. Ulrich therefore allied himself with the city of Groningen when Edzard attempted to expand his sphere of influence west of the Ems during the Saxon feud. In 1499, he entered into an alliance with Groningen to expel Count Edzard from Appingedam, Oterdum, and other occupied areas with an army of 4,000 men. Several attempts to expel Edzard failed, however. When the majority of his mercenary army also switched sides to John V of Oldenburg, it became impossible for Ulrich to meet Groningen's demands. Ulrich then joined Duke John V of Saxe-Lauenburg. This ruler was also hostile to Edzard and had long tried to conquer the Frisians from the Wursten region. Ulrich was wounded in battle against the Wursten Frisians and was incapacitated for a while. Ulrich later reconciled with Count Edzard and entered his service as court marshal. Ulrich played a key role in the negotiations between the city of Groningen and Edzard concerning the city's surrender. On May 1, 1506, the city accepted Edzard as its lord.

In June 1526, Ulrich von Dornum initiated and organized the so-called Colloquy of Oldersum in the Oldersum Church. The transcript of the Oldersum Colloquy, which he wrote, was printed by Nikolaus Schirlentz in Wittenberg that same year. By distributing this document, Ulrich von Dornum made a decisive contribution to the widespread spread and rapid implementation of the Reformation in East Frisia.

== Sources ==
- Paul Wagner (1895). "Dornum, Ulrich von" . Allgemeine Deutsche Biographie (in German). Vol. 39. Leipzig: Duncker & Humblot. pp. 246–248.
- Gerhard Ohling (1959). "Dornum, Ulrich von". Neue Deutsche Biographie (in German). Vol. 4. Berlin: Duncker & Humblot. p. 82. (full text online).
