= Armgard, Countess of Rietberg =

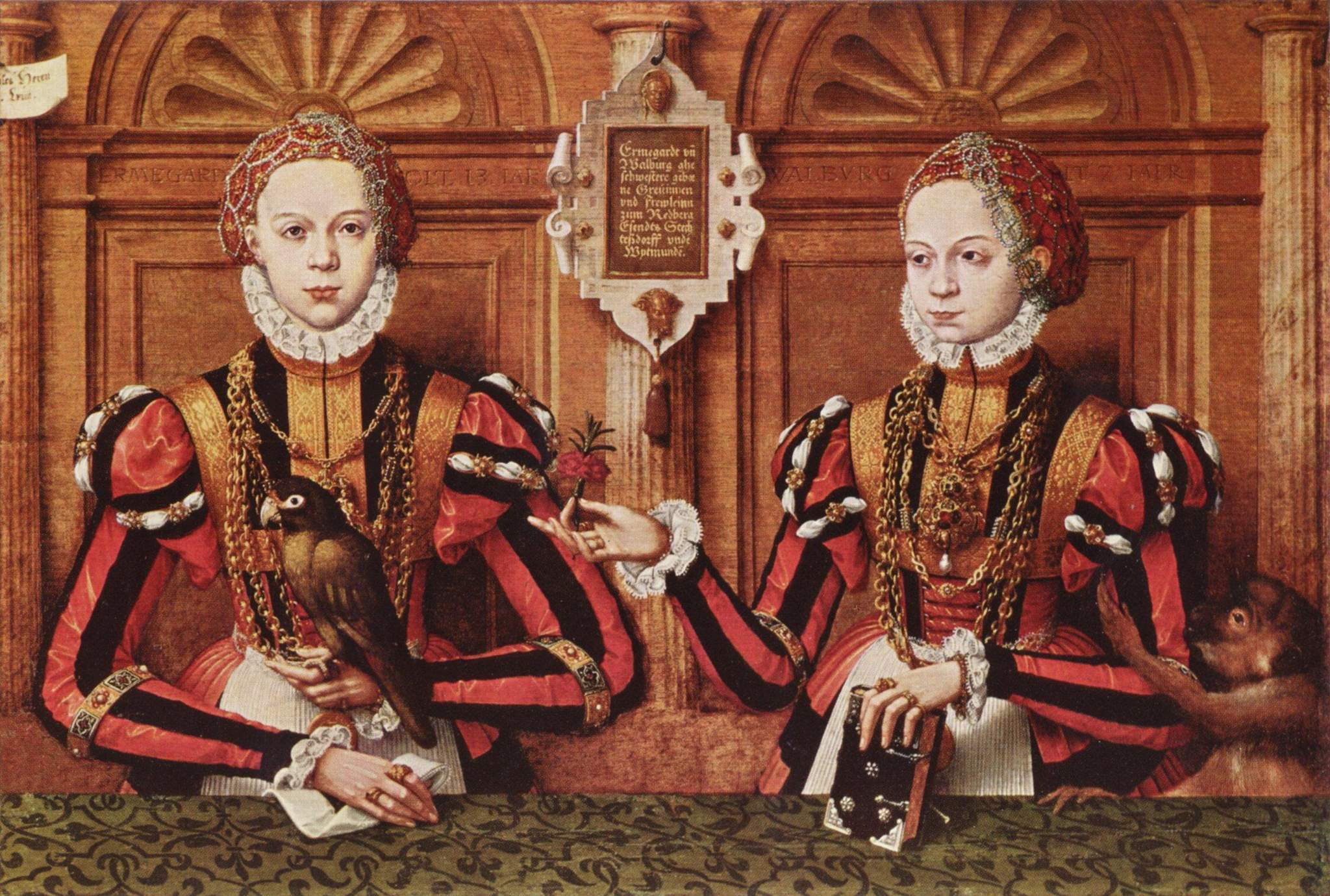
- Armgard and Walburgis of Rietberg, detail of a family portrait by Hermann tom Ring

Countess of Rietberg
- Reign: 1565 - 13 July 1584
- Predecessor: Agnes of Bentheim-Steinfurt (as regent)
- Successor: Walburgis of Rietberg
- Alongside: Walburgis of Rietberg (1565–1576)

Lady of Esens, Stedesdorf and Wittmund
- Reign: 1565 - 27 September 1576
- Predecessor: Agnes of Bentheim-Steinfurt (as regent)
- Successor: Walburgis of Rietberg (as sole ruler)
- Alongside: Walburgis of Rietberg (1565–1576)
- Born: 1555/1556; Rietberg
- Died: 13 July 1584
- Spouse: Eric V, Count of Hoya; Simon VI, Count of Lippe
- House: Werl-Arnsberg-Cuyk
- Father: John II, Count of Rietberg
- Mother: Agnes of Bentheim-Steinfurt

Countess Armgard of Rietberg (also: Irmgard; died 13 July 1584) was from 1565 to 1584 Countess of Rietberg in her own right. She was also Countess of Hoya by marriage from 1568 to 1575 and Countess of Lippe by marriage from 1578 until her death.

Armgard was the elder of two daughters of John II and his wife, Countess Agnes of Bentheim-Steinfurt. Armgard married on 3 January 1568 Count Eric V of Hoya. He died on 12 March 1575. Armgard then married on 26 June 1578 Count Simon VI of Lippe.

Her father died on 11 December 1562. Because she had no brothers, Armgard and her sister Walburgis inherited his possessions. Because they were minors, their mother acted as guardian and Regent. On 27 September 1576, Armgard and Walburgis divided their inheritance: Armgard received Rietberg; Walburgis received the Lordships of Esens, Stedesdorf and Wittmund.

Armgard died childless on 13 July 1584 and the County of Rietberg fell to her sister Walburgis, so that the County of Rietberg and Harlingerland were reunited in one hand.

== References and sources ==
- Onno Klopp (1856), Geschichte Ostfrieslands von 1570-1751, Rümpler, pp. 25 ff

== Footnotes ==
Armgard, Countess of Rietberg House of Rietberg Died: 13 July 1584
Preceded by John II	Countess of Rietberg; 1565–1584	Succeeded by Walburgis
Preceded by Katharina of Waldeck-Eisenberg	Countess consort of Lippe; 1578–1584	Succeeded by Elisabeth of Holstein-Schaumburg
