= Otto IV of Rietberg =

Otto IV

Count of Rietberg
- Reign: 18 December 1535 - 5/6 January 1553
- Predecessor: Otto III
- Successor: John II (as sole ruler)
- Alongside: John II (1535–1553)
- Died: 5 or 6 January 1553; Outside Metz
- Burial: Franciscan monastery in Rietberg
- Spouse: Catharine of Zweibrücken
- House: Werl-Arnsberg-Cuyk
- Father: Otto III, Count of Rietberg
- Mother: Anna of Sayn

Count Otto IV of Rietberg (d. 5 or 6 January 1553 outside Metz) was Count of Rietberg from 1535 until his death.

== Life ==
Otto IV was the eldest son of Otto III and his first wife Anna of Sayn. In the marriage contract of two, it was agreed that the first-born from their marriage should become a cleric. However, the contract allowed the first-born to become count, if he so wished. This led to many disputes between Otto IV and his half-brother John II from their father's second marriage.

In 1541, he joined the English army. In 1544, he returned to Germany and joined the staff of the Teutonic Knights. During his absence, Rietberg was administered by a Hessian bailiff. Otto IV promulgated an Evangelical Church Order modeled on the Hessian Church Order.

Otto IV died before Metz on 5 or 6 January 1553. He was buried in the Franciscan monastery in Rietberg. His cousin Frederick Wetter administered the County of Rietberg until Otto's half-brother John II took over.

== Marriage ==
Before 1 February 1541, Otto IV married Catharine, the youngest daughter of Count Palatine Alexander of Zweibrücken. The marriage remained childless.

Otto IV of Rietberg Werl-Arnsberg-Cuyk Died: 5 or 6 January 1553
Preceded by Otto III	Count of Rietberg; 1535–1553	Succeeded by John II
