= Balthasar Oomkens von Esens =

Lord of Harlingerland (1522-1540)

Balthasar I
- Lord of Esens, Stedesdorf and Wittmund
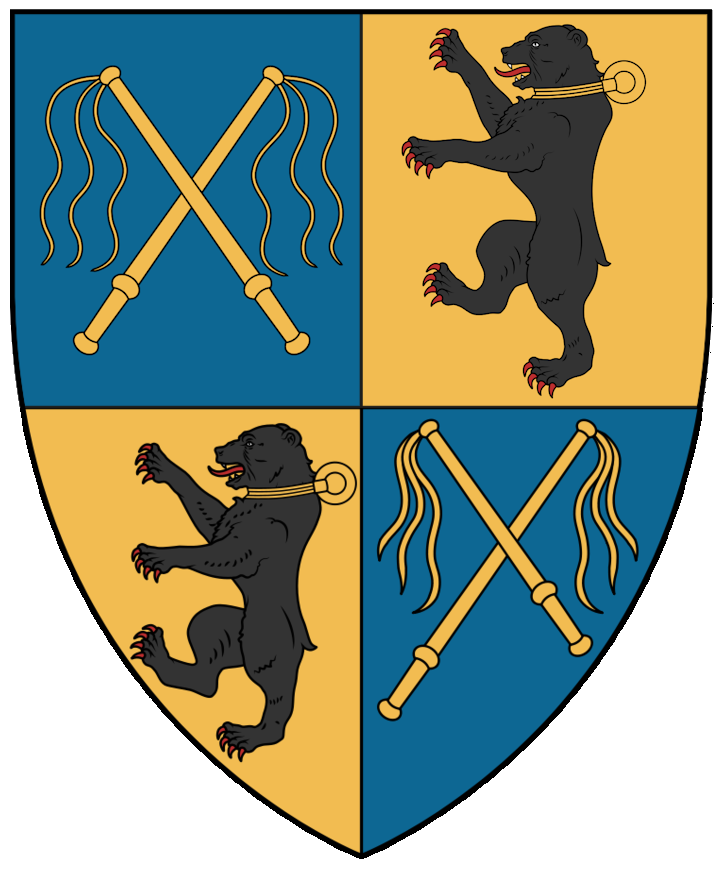
- Coat of Arms of the Attena dynasty

Lord of Esens, Stedesdorf and Wittmund
- Reign: 1522 - 1540
- Predecessor: Hero I
- Successor: Onna of Esens
- Born: c. 1500; Esens
- Died: 1540 (aged 39–40); Esens
- House: Attena-Osterburg
- Father: Hero Oomkens von Esens
- Mother: Irmgard of Oldenburg

Balthasar Oomkens von Esens (c. 1500 – 1540) was an East Frisian nobleman who died during the siege of his castle in Esens by the Bremen army. He was described by his partisans as the last true Frisian freedom fighter, although some decried his seemingly insatiable appetite for violence.

== Biography and history ==
Balthasar Oomkens von Esens was the son of Hero Oomkens von Esens, Lord of Esens, Stedesdorf and Wittmund and Irmgard of Oldenburg. The Oomkens family were established in East Frisia (now part of Niedersachsen in Germany) and in the Frisian Oldambt, in the Groninger Ommelanden (now part of Groningen in the Netherlands). The family prided itself on its direct descent from Radbod, King of the Frisians.

Balthasar led a successful resistance of the old Frisian aristocracy against the rise of the Cirksena family, which attempted to unite East Frisia under its rule from the late fifteenth century. The Cirksenas supported Protestantism whilst both Balthasar and his father remained loyal to the Catholic Church.

Allied to his close relations the Counts of Oldenburg and the Duke of Guelders, Balthasar Oomkens von Esens resisted the doubtful political power-grabbing attempted by the Cirksenas (which included a forged imperial document relating to the lordship of Harlingerland) and also championed the interests of the Catholic Church against the Reformation-minded allies of the Cirksenas. He allied himself with Duke Charles II. The powerful Duke of Guelders helped him defeat the counts of East Frisia during the Guelderian Feud and secure his rule in the Harlingerland. As a result of his resistance, Harlingerland remained a free lordship under its own jurisdiction until it came through inheritance to Frederick the Great in 1744.

Balthasar Oomkens von Esens was a popular figure among the Frisian people and has remained so. He is generally remembered today as "Junker Balthasar" and in Esens (whose city rights he granted in 1527) there is a yearly festival in his honour.

== Legends ==
There is a legend associated with Balthasar Oomkens von Esens which still finds expression in the city's coat of arms. One year, the city was besieged by Bremen, and amongst the people trapped behind the city walls there was an itinerant musician and his performing bear. As the siege dragged on, provisions ran out and the famished bear escaped. Breaking free of his chains, the bear climbed up one of the defensive towers, where his enraged roars attracted the attention of the besiegers. In his confusion, the bear broke some of the stones from the ancient walls and hurled them at the enemy. The besiegers concluded that if the people of Esens had enough food to feed a bear, they must have plenty to feed themselves and as the spectacle of the roaring bear unsettled them, they called off the siege and returned to Bremen. In gratitude, the people of Esens immortalised the bear in their city's coat of arms (later also incorporated into the arms of East Frisia and of Wittmund (district)).

== Quotations ==
Balthasar Oomkens von Esens' motto was inscribed on a window-pane in Esens castle:

- "Wer das wol doht, der ist hochgeboren; Sonder doghede ist de adel verloren." (Who serves the common weal is nobly born; Without right actions, nobility is forlorn.")

Note: Alternative spellings/versions of his name are common, e.g.: Baltzer, Baldassar, etc.
