= Hero Oomkens von Esens =

Lord of Harlingerland (1473-1522)

Hero I
- Lord of Esens, Stedesdorf and Wittmund
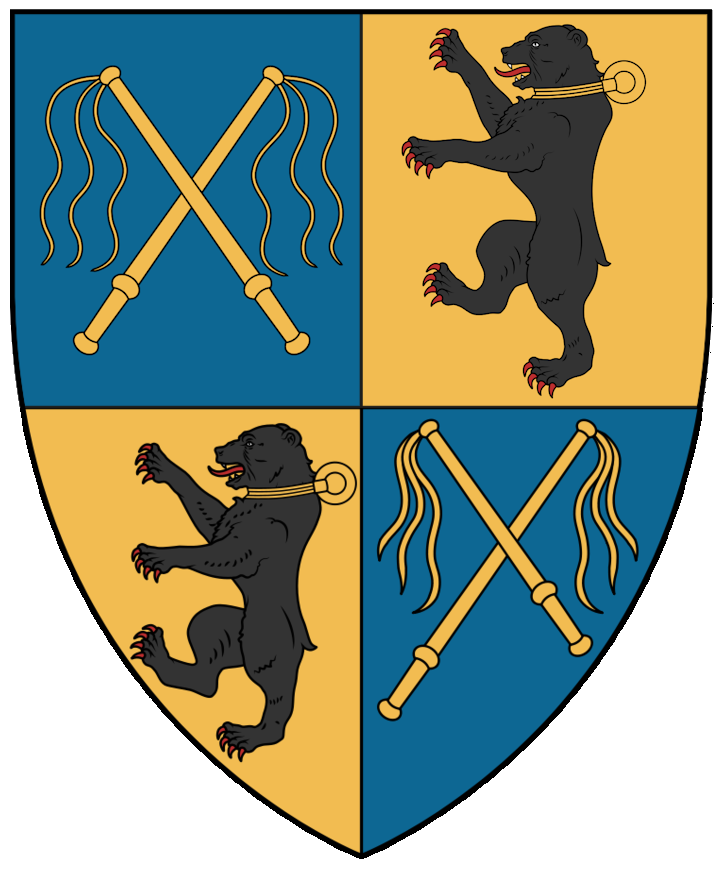
- Coat of Arms of the Attena dynasty

Lord of Esens, Stedesdorf and Wittmund
- Reign: 8 November 1473 - 1522
- Predecessor: Sibet I
- Successor: Balthasar I
- Born: c. 1455
- Died: 1522 (aged 66–67)
- Spouse: Irmgard of Oldenburg
- House: Attena-Osterburg
- Father: Sibet Attena
- Mother: Onna of Stedesdorf

Hero Oomkens von Esens (c. 1455 – 1522) was a Frisian nobleman, the Lord of Esens, Stedesdorf and Wittmund. He inherited the title upon the death of his father, Sibet Attena von Esens, in 1473.

== Other names ==
He is usually referred to as Hero Oomkens "the Younger" to distinguish him from his maternal grandfather, Hero Oomkens the Elder. As with most names of this period, Hero Oomkens von Esens is referred to by a plethora of variations in contemporary texts (e.g. Hero, Here, Heer, Her; Omken, Omcken, Oemkens, Omkens). Moreover, given that he had held various lordships, he is also referred to, in addition to von or zu Esens, as von Wittmund, von Harlingerland, von Stedesdorf, etc.

== Family ==
The Oomkens family was established in East Frisia (now part of Niedersachsen in Germany) and the Frisian Oldambt, in the Groninger Ommelanden (now part of Groningen in the Netherlands). The family prided itself on its direct descent from Radbod, King of the Frisians.

Hero Oomkens von Esens' marriage to Irmgard, daughter of Gerhard VI, Count of Oldenburg in 1489 helped to cement the alliance of the old Frisian aristocracy with the Counts of Oldenburg in their struggle against the rise of the Cirksena family.

Hero Oomkens von Esens had five sons: Balthasar, Melchior, Caspar, Johann, and Sibo. They had two daughters. Onna married Otto von Rietberg, and Adelaide married her distant cousin Eppo Hayo Heres Oomkens van Ommeland of the Oldambt in the Groninger Ommeland.

Balthasar Oomkens von Esens succeeded his father on the latter's death in 1522. Sibo and Caspar joined their cousin, the King of Denmark, and died on active service with the Danes, with Caspar dying during the storming of Königsberg in 1521.

== Heraldic crest ==
Hero Oomkens von Esens' heraldic crest consisted of two crossed tournament lances (sometimes incorrectly referred to as whips or scourges), which were incorporated into the arms of the city of Wittmund (district), and are also featured in the arms of East Frisia.
