= Rietberg =

- Town
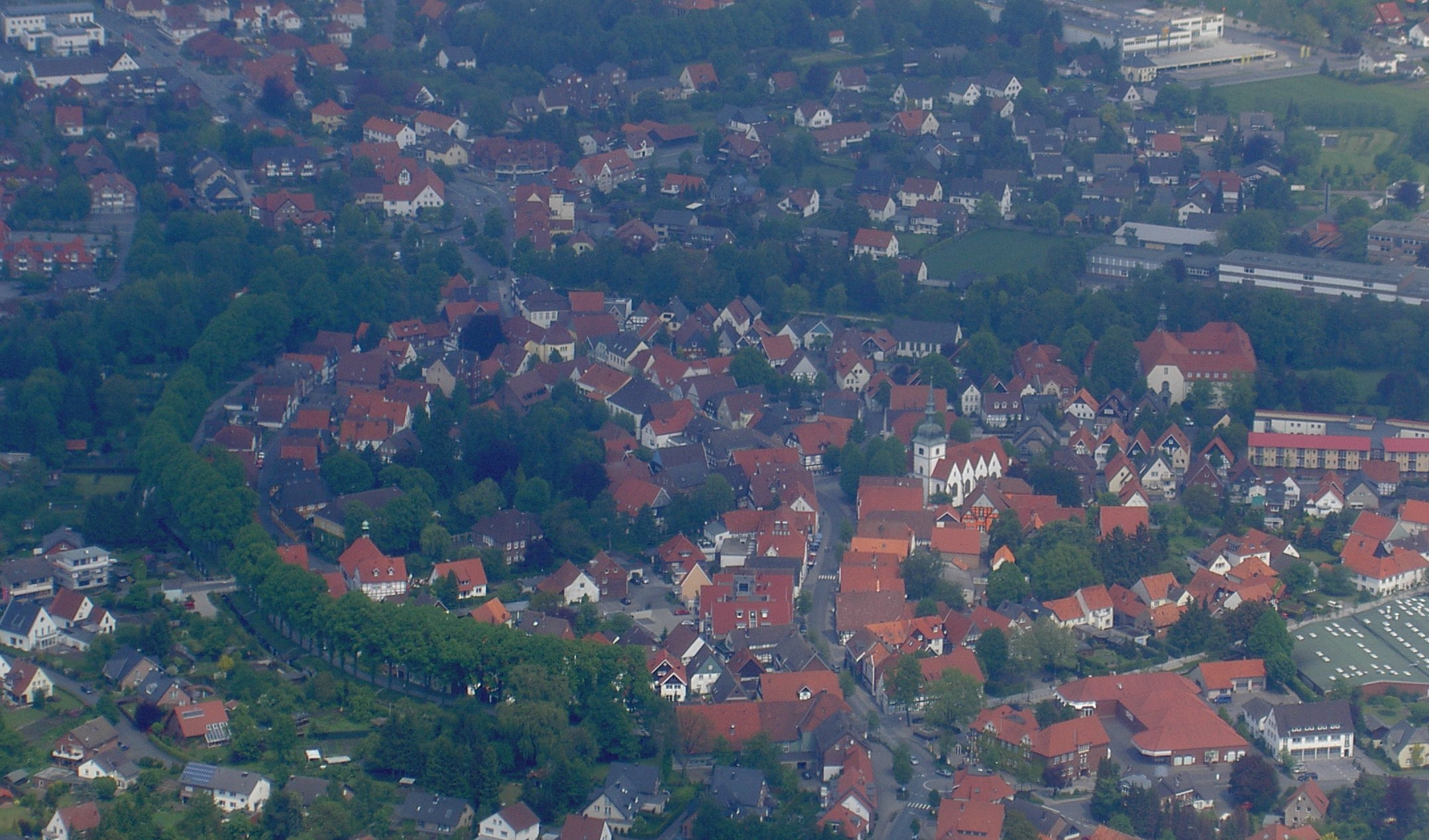
- Rietberg town centre, 2005

- Flag Coat of arms

- Location of Rietberg within Gütersloh district
- Interactive map of Rietberg
- Location within Germany Location within North Rhine-Westphalia
- Coordinates: 51°48′N 8°26′E
- Country: Germany
- State: North Rhine-Westphalia
- Admin. region: Detmold
- District: Gütersloh
- Subdivisions: 7

Government
  - Mayor (2018–23): Andreas Sunder (FW)

Area
  - Total: 110.31 km^{2} (42.59 sq mi)
- Elevation: 74–93 m (243–305 ft)

Population (2025-12-31)
  - Total: 29,858
  - Density: 270.67/km^{2} (701.04/sq mi)
- Time zone: UTC+01:00 (CET)
  - Summer (DST): UTC+02:00 (CEST)
- Postal codes: 33397
- Dialling codes: 05244 / 02944 / 05242 / 05248
- Vehicle registration: GT
- Website: www.rietberg.de

Rietberg (German: [ˈʁiːtbɛʁk]) is a town in the district of Gütersloh in the state of North Rhine-Westphalia, Germany. It is located approximately 10 km south of Gütersloh and 25 km north-west of Paderborn in the region Ostwestfalen-Lippe. The town is located on the river Ems. There are 28,878 people living in Rietberg.

== History ==
Rietberg was first mentioned as 'Rietbike' around the year 1100. This name refers to Ried which is an old name for reed and to 'Bach' which means creek. There was a castle that dated back to the 11th century. From 1237, it was seat of the imperial County of Rietberg.

The County of Rietberg was an independent German territory until the year 1807. In the Middle Ages the Rietberg county was a very small state. Nevertheless, Rietberg had its own militia, its own currency and its own laws. Even foreign policy, on a small scale, was conducted independently. Until the 17th century Rietberg coined its own money. Until the 18th century the government was located in the castle, built in the 14th century.

Wenzel Anton, Prince of Kaunitz-Rietberg, the Austrian chancellor, inherited the county from his mother. At the beginning of the 19th century the castle was torn down because it was not needed anymore. Only the St. John's chapel from 1748 can still be visited today.

In the year 1807 Rietberg became a part of Kingdom of Westphalia, while the title Count Rietberg remains extant in the House of Liechtenstein, with Hans-Adam II, Prince of Liechtenstein and each born member of his dynasty and their dynastic wives bearing the title currently.

The village itself was not independent anymore, in the year 1843 the municipality Rietberg was established. Since 1970 Rietberg has been organised politically as it is today.

== Population ==
Historical population

Year	Pop.	±% p.a.
1965	19,438	—
1970	20,609	+1.18%
1975	22,416	+1.70%
1980	23,598	+1.03%
1985	23,375	−0.19%
1990	24,138	+0.64%
1995	26,435	+1.83%

Year	Pop.	±% p.a.
2000	28,029	+1.18%
2005	28,790	+0.54%
2010	28,868	+0.05%
2015	29,436	+0.39%
2020	29,432	−0.00%
2025	29,858	+0.29%

Source: Landesdatabank Nordrhein-Westfalen

== Mayors ==
- Franz Funke:1970–1973
- Hans Paehler: 1973–1975
- Josef Kühlmann: 1975–1977
- Hubert Deittert (born 1941): 1977–1997
- André Kuper (born 1960): 1997–2012
- since 2012 (born 1973): Andreas Sunder

== Sights ==
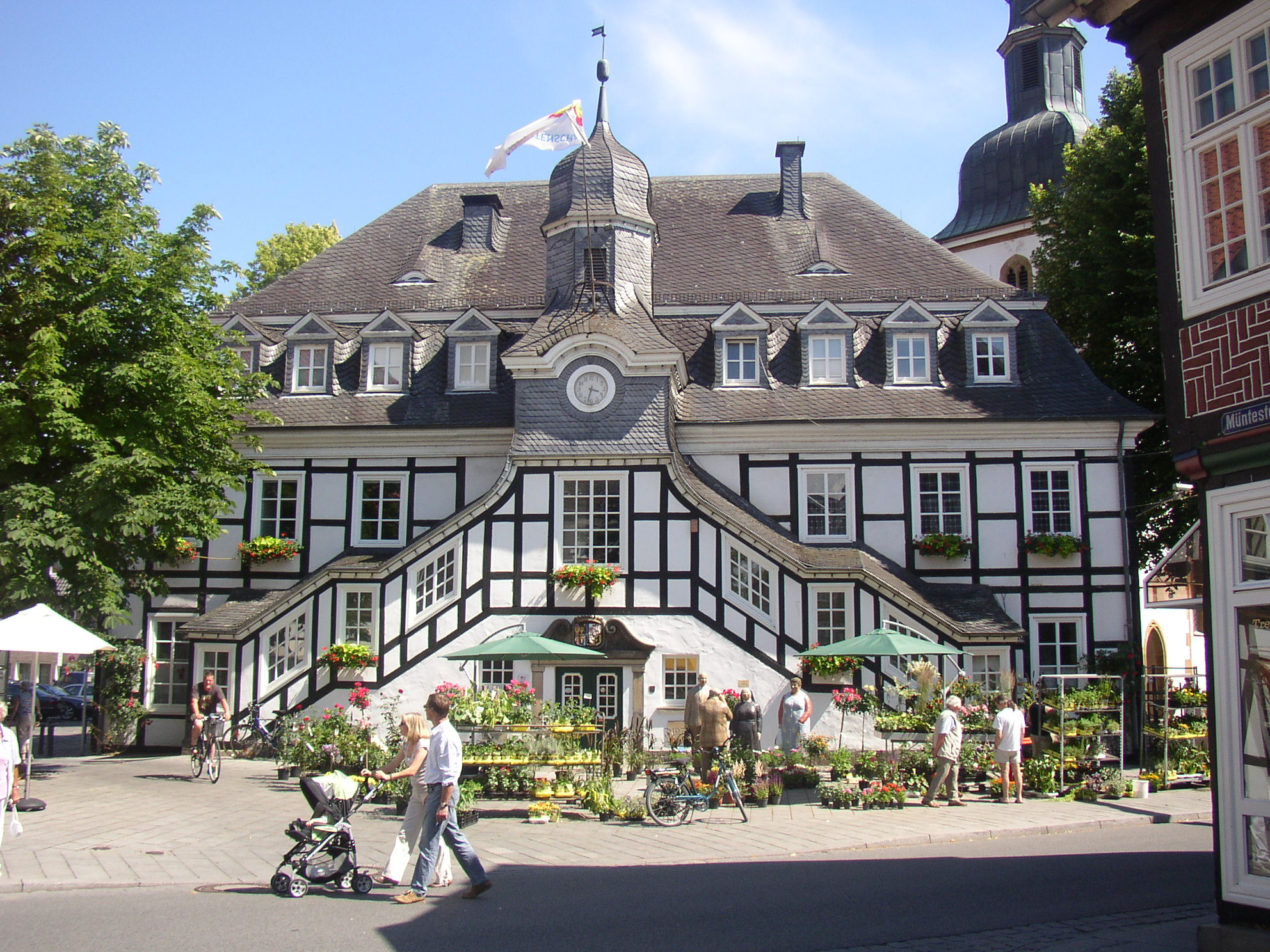
The historic town hall from around 1800

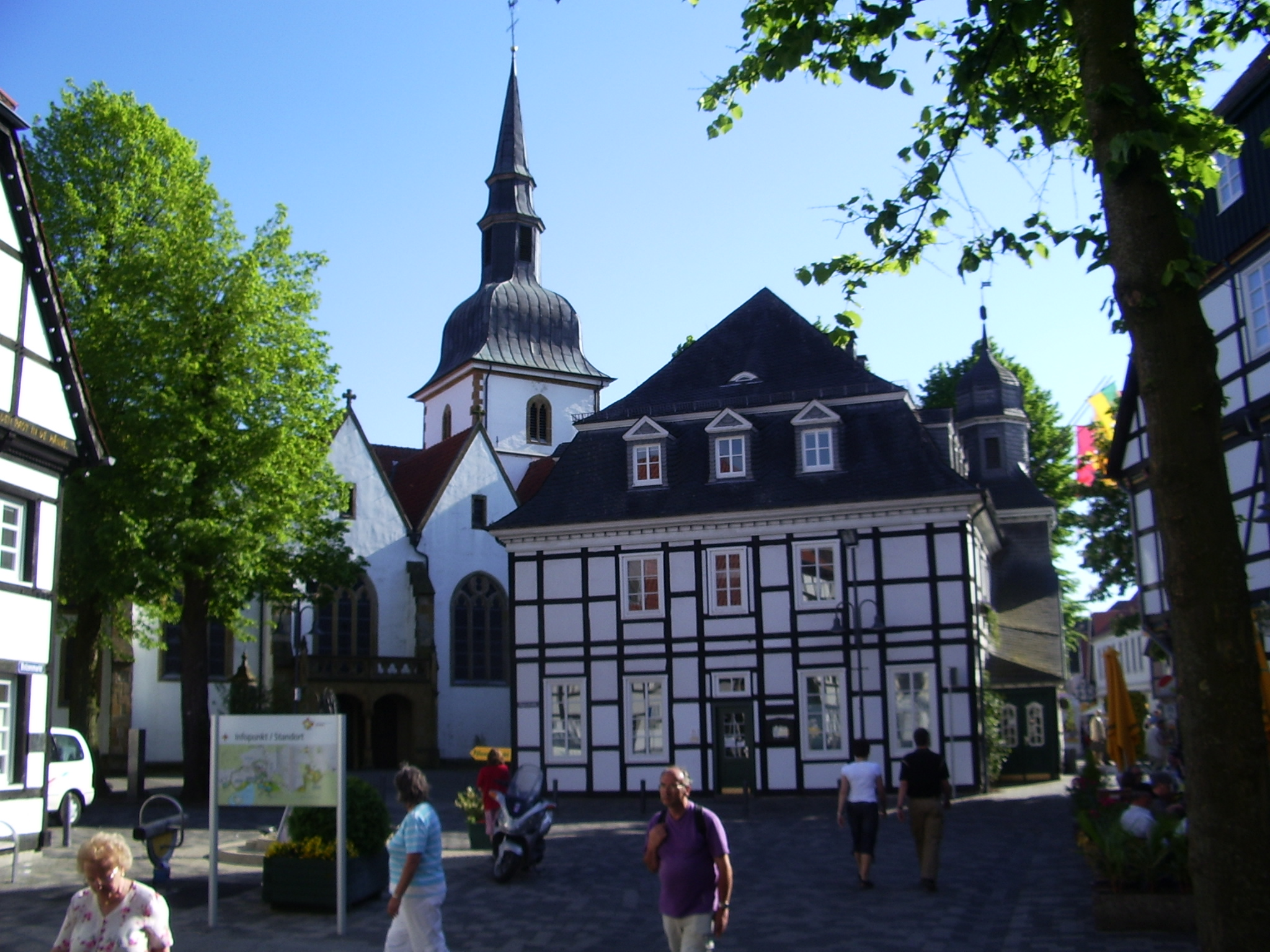
Rietberg town hall and St John the Baptist church

The best known building in Rietberg is the town hall from around 1800 in the centre of the town. There are several other interesting historical buildings in the town like the Altes Progymnasium, the chapel of St John or the old Court House. In the historical Town centre there are around 60 old renovated half-timbered houses. That's why Rietberg is also known as the town of beautiful gables. It's still possible to see where the former rampart surrounded the town. In the ward Varensell there is the Varensell Abbey from 1902.

== Events ==
In Rietberg carnival is the biggest event throughout the year. Every year around 50,000 people watch the Parade at Carnival Monday. After the parade people party in the streets and the bars for the whole night.

Other events are the Maikirmes Fair and the Stoppelkirmes Fair. And there are some traditional Schützenfeste, which are fairs featuring shooting matches in Rietberg.

Since 2004, there has been a summer Guitar Festival every year, with Tommy Emmanuel.

== Education ==
Schools in Rietberg:

- 6 elementary schools
- 1 secondary school of the type Hauptschule
- 1 secondary school of the type Realschule
- 1 secondary school of the type Gesamtschule
- 1 secondary school of the type Gymnasium
- 8 libraries
- 1 school for mentally handicapped children
- adult evening classes Volkshochschule with around 100 courses each semester

== Economy ==
An important industry for Rietberg and the surrounding area is the furniture industry. In Rietberg itself there is a big galvanizing plant and a schnapps distillery.

General facts, percentage of employees:

- Industry: 54.5%
- Commerce: 18.8%
- Service: 18.3%
- Agriculture: 1.0%
- Other: 7.4%

== Twin towns – sister cities ==
Rietberg is twinned with:

- Ribérac, France (1983)
- Głogówek, Poland (1999)

== Landesgartenschau ==
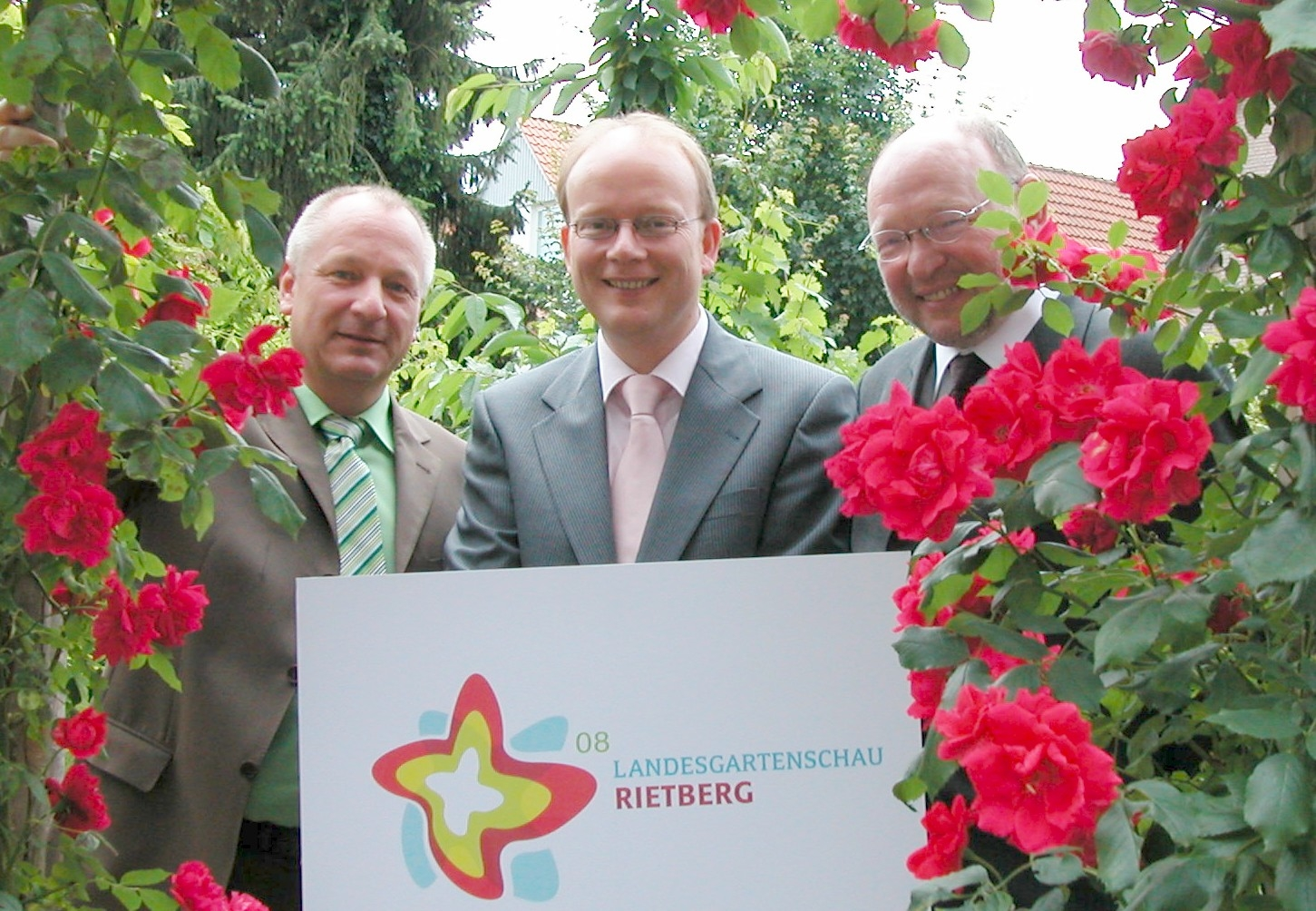
Presentation of the Logo for the 2008 gardening show

The Landesgartenschau of the year 2008 took place in Rietberg. The Landesgartenschau is a show of the federal state of North Rhine-Westphalia that shows gardens and parks of an area. It takes part in different cities each three years. A lot of park area has been created for the Landesgartenschau. Now there is an area with parks, gardens and playgrounds in Rietberg that can only be entered after paying an entrance fee.

== Built-up areas in the town of Rietberg ==
- Bokel
- Druffel
- Mastholte
- Neuenkirchen
- Rietberg
- Varensell
- Westerwiehe

== Notable people ==
- John II, Count of Rietberg (c. 1523–1562), nobleman
- Johann Conrad Schlaun (1695–1773), architect and building master
- Kitty Marion (1871–1944), suffragette, birth control advocate, activist, actress and music hall performer
