= Harlingerland =

Strip of land on the North Sea coast of East Frisia

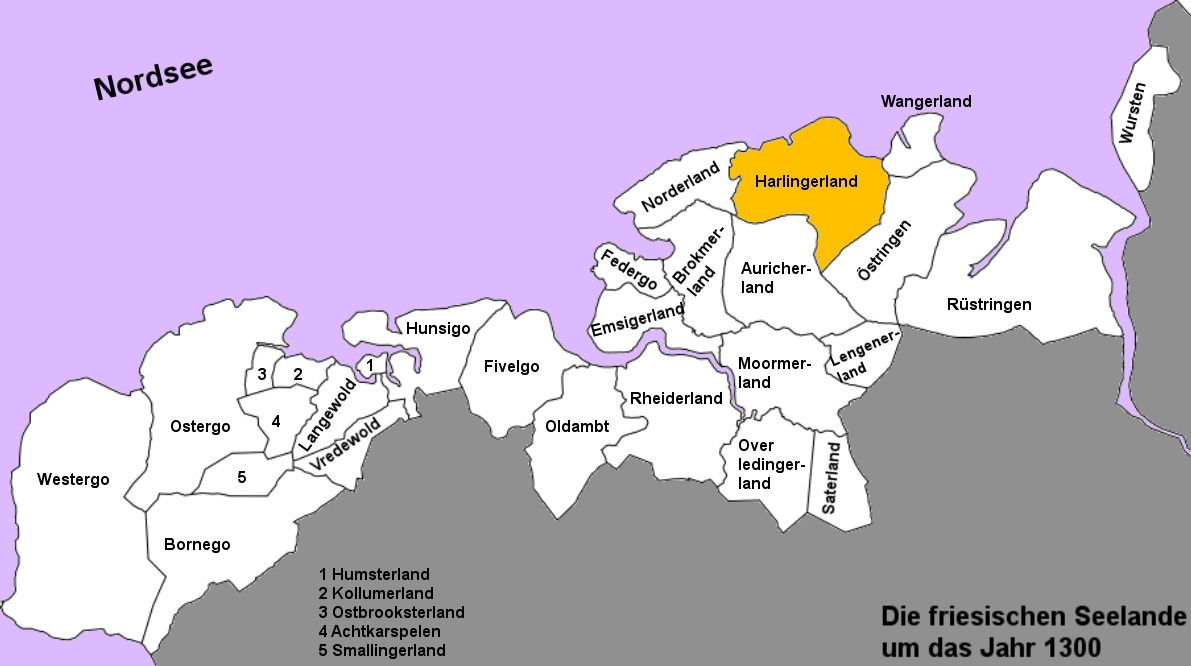
The Harlingerland around 1300

The Harlingerland is a strip of land on the North Sea coast of East Frisia. While today the whole of the district of Wittmund is usually described as Harlingerland, historically it specifically refers to the northern part of the present district, which formed the old Frisian state of this name, in particular, the regions around Esens and Wittmund. The region around Friedeburg still belonged at that time to the Frisian state of Östringen.

The local dialect for many folk in the Harlingerland is East Frisian Low Saxon (or East Frisian platt) but with a Harlinger variation somewhat different from the rest of East Frisia. The old Frisian language continued to be spoken in the Harlingerland much longer than in most other East Frisian regions. Wittmund produces the local paper of the Harlingerland, the Anzeiger für Harlingerland.

The Harlingerland is named for the Harlebucht, or Harle Bay, which has by now been almost completely filled in by farmland, through a series of dike-building projects spanning the last several centuries, commencing in 1545 and extending into the 20th century. The Harlebucht used to extend inland to the east of Werdum, north of Wittmund and Jever. Harlesiel, Harlingersiel, and Neuharlingersiel all take their name from the same source.
