= Stedesdorf =

- Municipality
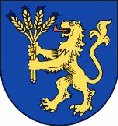
- Coat of arms

- Location of Stedesdorf within Wittmund district
- Interactive map of Stedesdorf
- Location within Germany Location within Lower Saxony
- Coordinates: 53°37′29″N 7°40′4″E
- Country: Germany
- State: Lower Saxony
- District: Wittmund
- Municipal assoc.: Esens
- Subdivisions: 4 Ortsteile

Government
  - Mayor: Anne Meemken

Area
  - Total: 27.95 km^{2} (10.79 sq mi)
- Elevation: 0 m (0 ft)

Population (2025-12-31)
  - Total: 1,648
  - Density: 58.96/km^{2} (152.7/sq mi)
- Time zone: UTC+01:00 (CET)
  - Summer (DST): UTC+02:00 (CEST)
- Postal codes: 26427
- Dialling codes: 0 49 71
- Vehicle registration: WTM

Stedesdorf is a municipality in the district of Wittmund, in Lower Saxony, Germany.

== Geography ==
Stedesdorf is a settlement on the edge of the Geest in the East Frisian region of Lower Saxony. The municipality comprises the villages of Stedesdorf, Mamburg, Osteraccum, and Thunum.
