= County of Rietberg =

State of the Holy Roman Empire

County of Rietberg Grafschaft Rietberg
- 1237–1807
- Coat of arms

- County of Rietberg in 1560
- Status: County
- Capital: Rietberg; 51°48′N 8°26′E
- Official languages: German
- Religion: Catholicism; Protestantism (after 1560); Judaism
- Government: Comital
- Historical era: Middle Ages
  - Became Reichsfrei county: 1237
  - Raised to Imperial county: 1353
  - Subordinated to Landgraviate of Hesse: 1807
  - Mediatised to Westphalia: 1807
Preceded by	Succeeded by
Duchy of Westphalia / Duchy of Westphalia	Kingdom of Westphalia / Kingdom of Westphalia

The County of Rietberg (German: Grafschaft Rietberg) was a state of the Holy Roman Empire, located in the present-day German state of North Rhine-Westphalia. It was situated on the upper Ems in Westphalia, between the Prince-Bishopric of Paderborn and the Prince-Bishopric of Münster. It existed as an independent territory from 1237 to 1807, when it was mediatised to the Kingdom of Westphalia.

== History ==
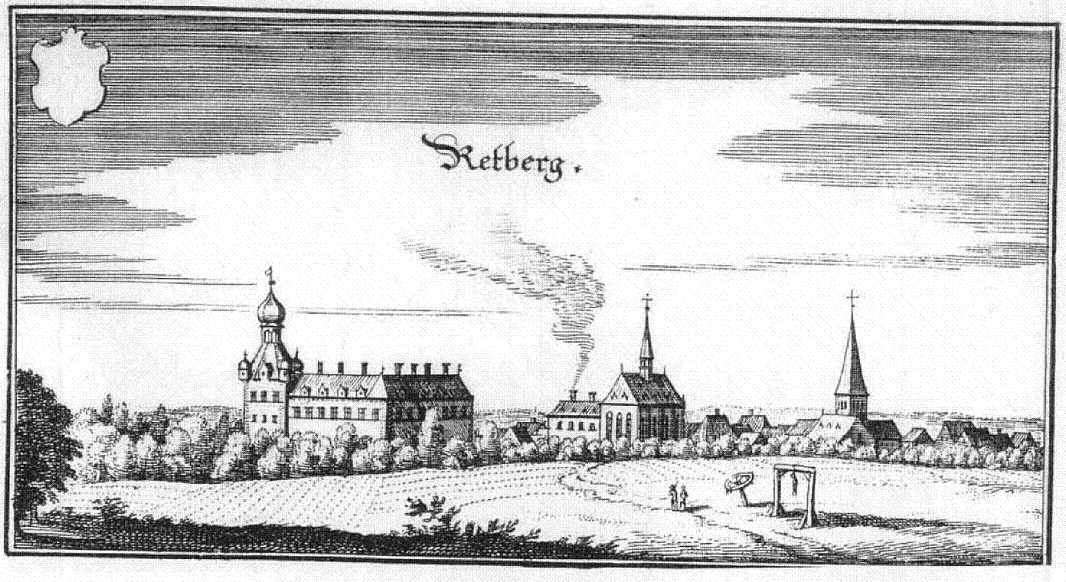
Engraved view of Rietberg (1647).

Rietberg was first mentioned as Rietbike around the year 1100. This name refers to the German words ried (an old name for "reed") and bach ("creek"). There was a castle that dated back to the 11th century. From 1237 until 1807, Rietberg was an independent German territory, although very small. Nevertheless, the county had its own militia, its own currency and its own laws; even foreign policy, on a small scale, was conducted independently. Until the 17th century, Rietberg coined its own money.

In 1699, the County of Rietberg came into the possession of the Moravian noble family of the Counts of Kaunitz (Czech: Kounic) through the marriage of heiress Maria Ernestine Franziska of Ostfriesland, Countess von Rietberg (1687–1758) with Count Maximilian Ulrich von Kaunitz, and that family subsequently renamed itself as Kaunitz-Rietberg. Under the rule of this comital (later princely) family, the territory remained independent until the end of the Holy Roman Empire.

In 1807, Rietberg became mediatised to the Kingdom of Westphalia. After the dissolution of that kingdom in 1813, the territory of Rietberg became part of the Kingdom of Prussia, which integrated it into its Province of Westphalia.

== Comital title ==
The title of Count of Rietberg (Graf zu Rietberg) remains extant in the House of Liechtenstein, which has claimed it since 1848, when the last member of the Moravian branch of the Kaunitz family (Prince Aloys von Kaunitz-Rietberg) died. Hans-Adam II, Prince of Liechtenstein, and all dynastic members of his family (and their dynastic wives) bear the title currently.
