= Esens, Lower Saxony =

Esens
- Town
- Flag Coat of arms

- Location of Esens within Wittmund district
- Interactive map of Esens
- Location within Germany Location within Lower Saxony
- Coordinates: 53°38′49″N 7°36′46″E
- Country: Germany
- State: Lower Saxony
- District: Wittmund
- Municipal assoc.: Esens

Government
  - Mayor: Karin Emken

Area
  - Total: 26.83 km^{2} (10.36 sq mi)
- Elevation: 3 m (9.8 ft)

Population (2025-12-31)
  - Total: 7,045
  - Density: 262.6/km^{2} (680.1/sq mi)
- Time zone: UTC+01:00 (CET)
  - Summer (DST): UTC+02:00 (CEST)
- Postal codes: 26427
- Dialling codes: 04971
- Vehicle registration: WTM
- Website: www.esens.de

Esens is a municipality in the district of Wittmund, in Lower Saxony, Germany. It is situated near the North Sea coast, approx. 14 km northwest of Wittmund, and 20 km northeast of Aurich.

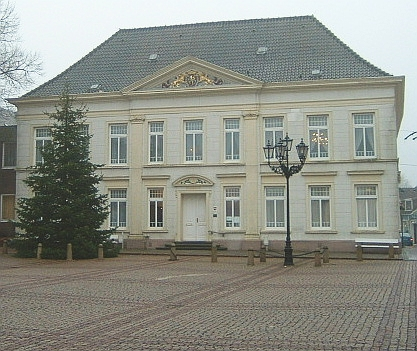
Esens townhall in wintertime

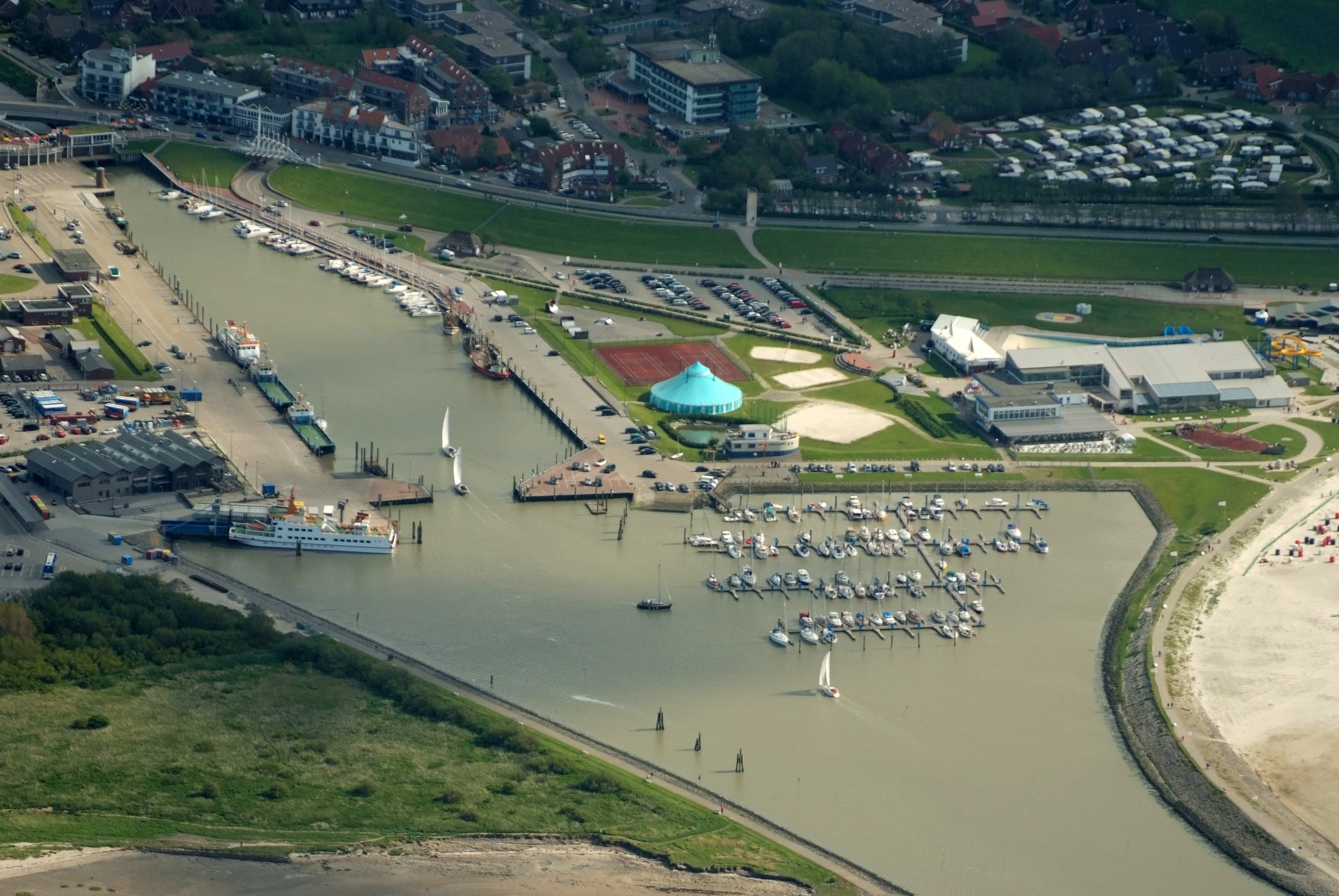
Aerial view of Esens harbour Bensersiel

Esens is also the seat of the Samtgemeinde ("collective municipality") Esens.

== Sons and daughters of the city ==
- Eilert Dieken (1898-1960), German Nazi policeman and gendarme who murdered the Ulma family in Markowa (Poland) in 1944
- David Fabricius (1564-1617), theologian, major amateur astronomer and cartographer
- Johann Hülsemann (1602-1661), Lutheran theologian
- Philipp Heinrich Erlebach (1657-1714), composer
- Christian Everhard, Prince of East Frisia (1665-1708), Prince of East Friesland from the House of Cirksena
- Enno Rudolph Brenneysen, (1669-1734), jurist and chancellor of East Friesland
- Philipp Ludwig Statius Müller (1725-1776), theologian, zoologist and professor in Erlangen
- Theodore Thomas (conductor) (1835-1905), composer, founder of the Chicago Symphony Orchestra
- Gerhard Tappen (1866-1953), General of the Artillery
- Timo Schultz (born 1977), German footballer

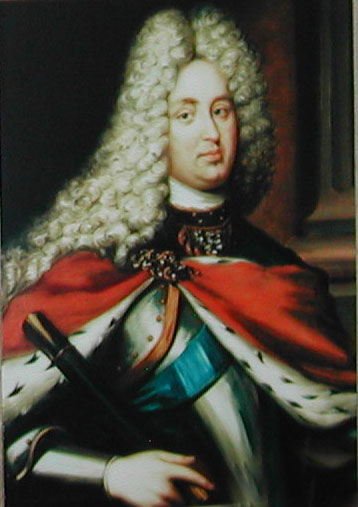
Christian Everhard

== Economy and infrastructure ==
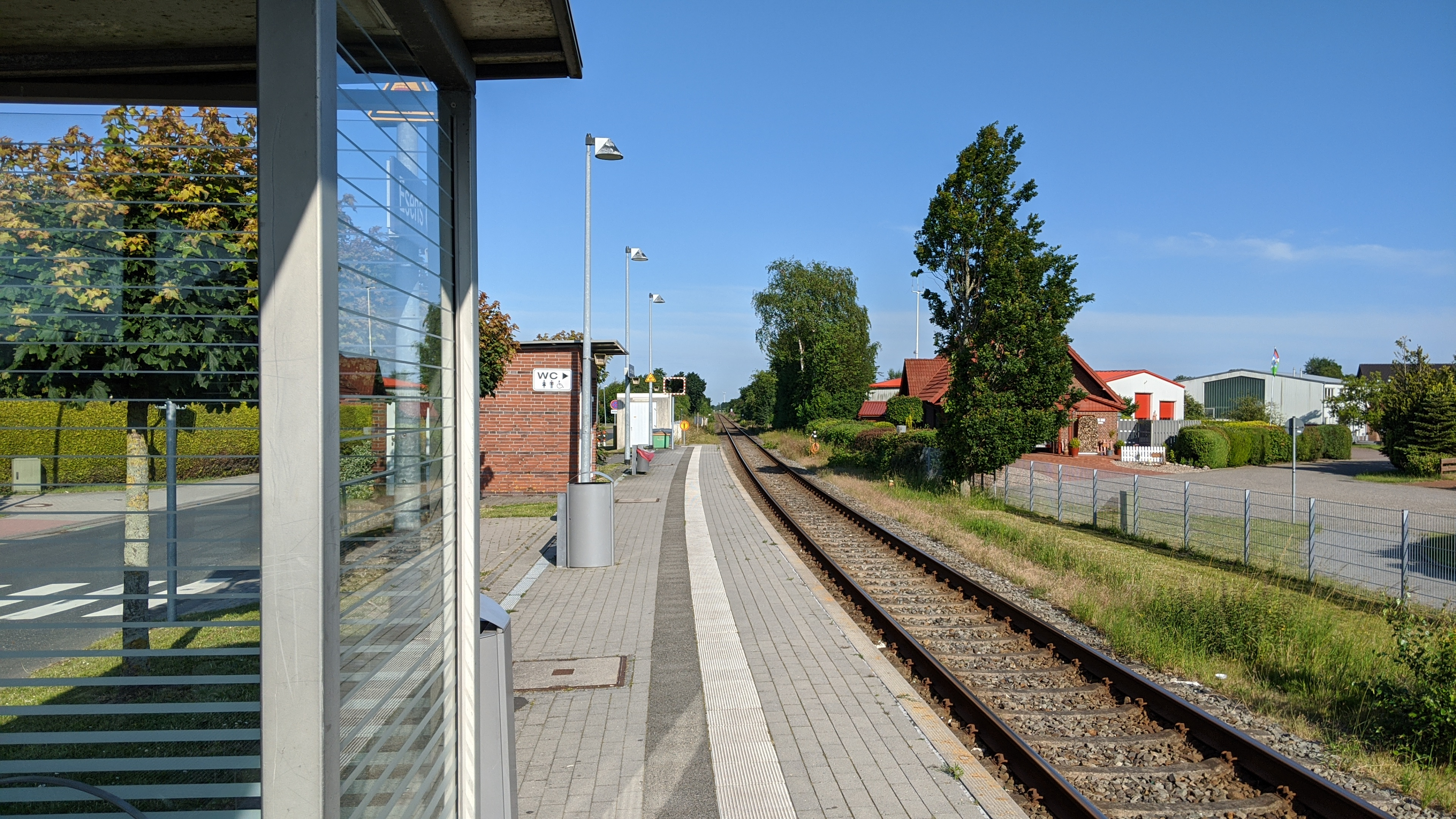
Esens stop

Esens is located on RB59 line (East Frisian coastal railway), which runs from Oldenburg via Sande, Jever and Wittmund to Esens.

In the past, the narrow gauge railway from Leer via Aurich to Esens-Bensersiel also was running here, nowadays it's deconstructed.

Esens is located on the area if the transport association Verkehrsverbund Ems-Jade (VEJ), but it's fare only applies for bus rides.

Some local bus lines, including the line to Bensersiel port (ferry to Langeoog, serve Esens.

There's a bicycle way from Esens-Bensersiel to Dornum as well.
