= Alting =

Alting is a surname, and may refer to:

- Bart Carpentier Alting (born 1954)
- Jacob Alting (1618–1679), Dutch philologist and theologian
- Johann Heinrich Alting (1583–1644), minister
- Menso Alting (1541–1612), Dutch Reformed preacher and reformer
- Ron Alting, a member of the Indiana State Senate
- Willem Arnold Alting (1724–1800), Dutch colonial administrator

== See also ==
- Althing, the national parliament of Iceland
