= Lambertine de Ligne =

Lambertine de Ligne (1593–1651) was a noblewoman and heiress from the Habsburg Netherlands.

== Biography ==
Lambertine was born on 22 June 1593, the third daughter and fifth child of Lamoral, Count of Ligne and Anne-Marie de Melun, Marquise de Roubaix. She was raised at the Brussels court of Archduke Albert and Infanta Isabella, and throughout her life expressed an admiration for the Infanta Isabella's virtues. In 1609 she married Philibert de la Baume, Marquis of Saint-Martin-le-Châtel, with whom she had a daughter. She was widowed in 1613, when her husband died in a hunting accident. In 1615 she married again, to Christopher of East Frisia, a younger son of Edzard II, Count of East Frisia, and the Swedish princess Katarina Vasa. As lady of Villers she was patroness of the parish church and in 1617 stood godmother to its new bell.

She had no children with her second husband, who died in 1636 leaving her as his sole legatee. On 7 February 1640 she married her first husband's brother, Jean-Baptiste de la Baume, governor of Franche-Comté, with a special dispensation from Pope Urban VIII to allow their union despite their prior relationship by marriage. This seems to have been part of a dynastic policy to tighten links between the Habsburg Netherlands and the Franche-Comté. She died on 14 February 1651 and was buried alongside her second husband in Spontin. Although she had been married three times, she had produced no male heirs. Her nephews were still disputing her inheritance in the Great Council of Mechelen as late as 1691.
