= Christopher of East Frisia =

East Frisian nobleman and knight

Arms of the House of Cirksena

Christopher of East Frisia (1569–1636) was an East Frisian nobleman and knight of the Golden Fleece who served as governor of the Duchy of Luxembourg in the Habsburg Netherlands.

== Early life ==
Born into the ruling House of Cirksena, Christopher was the third son of Edzard II, Count of East Frisia, and the Swedish princess Katarina Vasa.

== Biography ==
Although raised a Lutheran, he later converted to Catholicism. In 1619 he was awarded the Golden Fleece by Philip III of Spain, and acquired the barony of Willebroek in the Duchy of Brabant. On 8 June 1619 he bought the lordship of Spontin in the County of Namur, the transfer of which was confirmed on 12 January 1621.

He was appointed governor of Luxembourg in April 1627, and made his solemn entry into the City of Luxembourg on 8 September the same year. He commanded the forces that carried out the pro-Habsburg coup in Trier on 26 March 1635. He died on 19 March 1636 and was buried in the Lady chapel of the parish church of Spontin. He had no heirs, and left everything to his widow.

== Personal life ==
In 1613 he married Princess Lambertine de Ligne (1593–1651), daughter of Lamoral, Prince of Ligne. They had no children.
