= Lamoral, Prince of Ligne =

Lamoral I
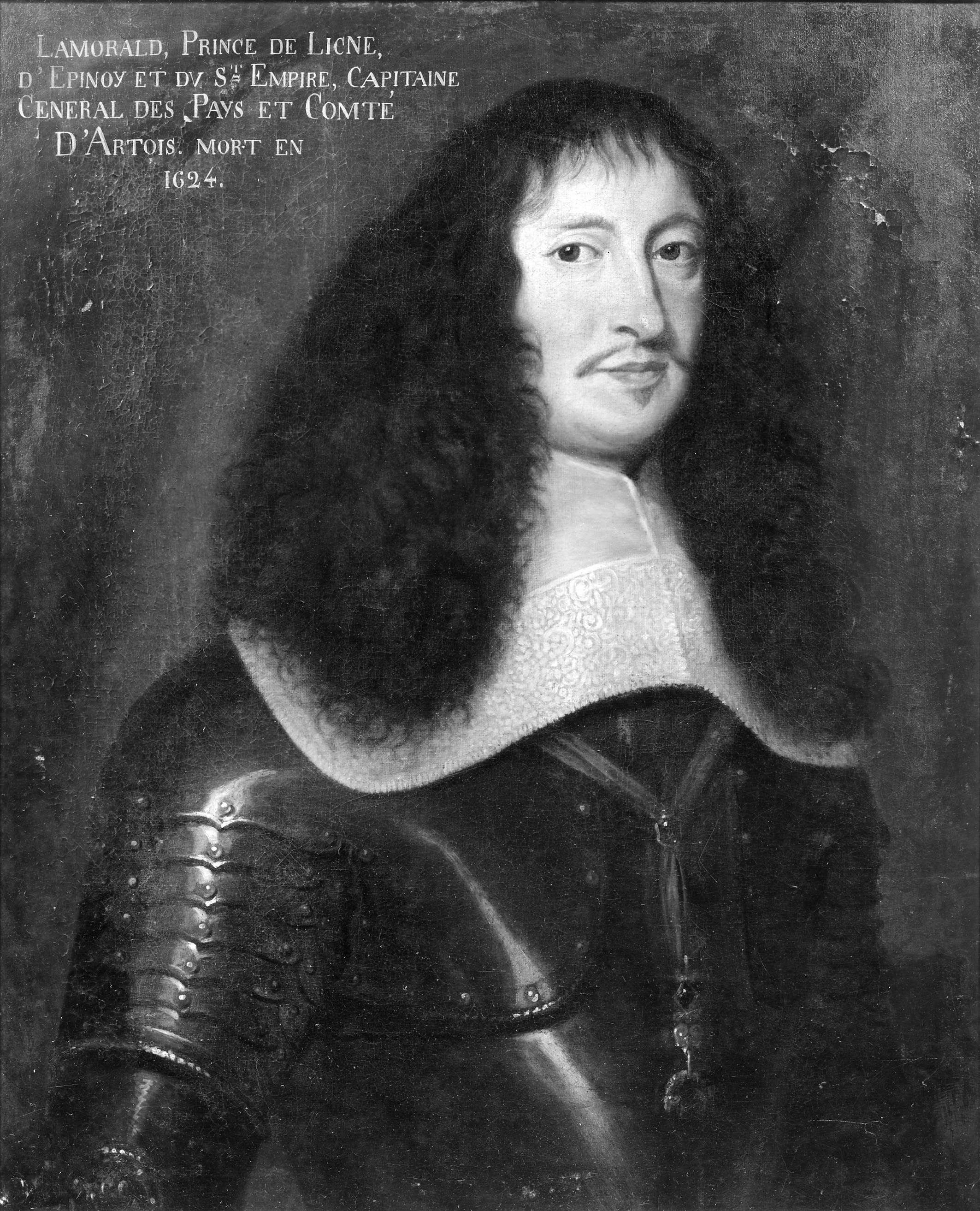

Count of Ligne
- Reign: 1583 – 1601
- Predecessor: Philippe

Prince of Ligne
- Reign: 1601 – 1624
- Successor: Albert Henri
- Born: 19 July 1563; Château de Belœil
- Died: 6 February 1624 (aged 60); Brussels
- Spouse: Anne-Marie de Melun
- Issue: Yolande, Duchess of Croÿ; Prince Alexander; Florent, 1st Prince of Amblise; Anne, Marquise de Guadalest; Lambertine, Baroness de Montmartin; Ernestine Yolande, Countess of Nassau-Siegen
Names
- Lamoral de Ligne
- House: House of Ligne
- Father: Philippe, Count of Ligne
- Mother: Margarethe de Lalaing
- Religion: Roman Catholicism

Lamoral, 1st Prince of Ligne (19 July 1563, in Château de Belœil – 6 February 1624, in Brussels) was a diplomat in the 17th century.

== Early life ==
Lamoral, Count and after 1601 first Prince de Ligne and Prince d'Épinoy, was the son of Philip, Count of Ligne (died 1583), and his wife, Countess Marguerite de Lalaing (died 1598), daughter of Philip, Count of Hoogstraten. He was the uncle of Rasse of Gavre, 1st Marquess of Ayseau.

== Biography ==
As a diplomat, the first Prince de Ligne was involved in many historic events of his time. He represented Archduke Albert of Austria and Infanta Isabella Clara Eugenia of Spain at the court of King Henry IV of France, in Spain and again in Paris, to congratulate King Louis XIII with his marriage with the daughter of Philip III of Spain. During this mission, he discussed several issues with the French political leaders.

In 1601 he received from Rudolf II, Holy Roman Emperor the hereditary title of Prince de Ligne.

In 1621 Prince Lamoral I was made grandee of Spain by King Philip IV of Spain for his services rendered to the Crown. He was also made a Knight in the Order of the Golden Fleece.

== Marriage and children ==
In 1584 Lamoral married Anne-Marie de Melun (died 1634), Marquise de Roubaix, daughter of Hugues II de Melun (1520–1553). They had six children:

1. Alexandre (1587–1588), died in infancy.
2. Yolande (1585–1611), married in 1599 to Charles Alexandre de Croÿ, Marquis of Havré (1581–1624), son of Charles Philippe; had one daughter.
3. Florent (1588–1622), Marquis of Roubaix, married in 1608 with Princess Louise of Lorraine (1594–1667), daughter of Henri de Lorraine-Chaligny. They had:
  1. Albert Henri (1615–1641), 2nd Prince de Ligne, married his cousin Princess Claire Marie of Nassau-Siegen (1621–1695), daughter of Ernestine Yolande de Ligne and John VIII, Count of Nassau-Siegen; no issue.
  2. Claude Lamoral (1618–1679), 3rd Prince of Ligne, married his brother's widow; had issue.
4. Anne (1590–1651), married Felipe Folch de Cardona, Marquis of Guadelesta; had one daughter:
  1. Maria Felipa (b. 1614), who married Don Francisco de Palafox y Blanes, Marquis of Ariza, Señor de Cortes.
5. Lambertine (1593–1651), married firstly Philibert de La Baume, Marquis of Saint-Martin-le-Châtel (1586–1610); had one daughter. She married secondly Count Christopher of Ostfriesland. She married for the third time, Jean Baptiste de La Baume, 4.Marquis of Saint-Martin-le-Châtel (1593-1641).
6. Ernestine Yolande (1594–1668), married in 1618 to John VIII, Count of Nassau-Siegen (1583–1638); had issue.

Lamoral, Prince of Ligne House of Ligne Born: 19 July 1563 Died: 6 February 1624
Regnal titles
Preceded by Philippe, Count of Ligne	Count of Ligne; 1583–1601	Himself as Prince
New creation	Prince of Ligne; 1601–1624	Succeeded by Albert Henri
