= Anna of Oldenburg =

Regent of East Frisia from 1542 to 1561

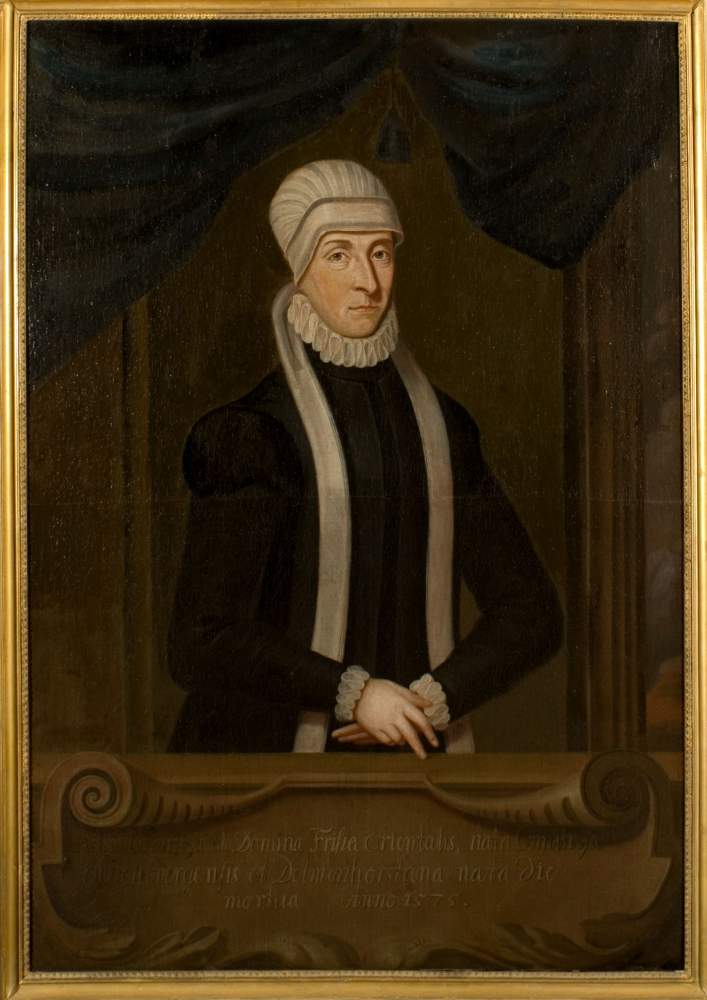
- Anna of Oldenburg

Countess consort of East Frisia
- Reign: 6 March 1530 – 24 September 1540
- Predecessor: Elisabeth of Rietberg
- Successor: Catherine of Sweden

Countess of East Frisia (as regent)
- Reign: 24 September 1540 - 1561
- Predecessor: Enno II
- Successor: Edzard II; Johan II
- Born: 14 November 1501; Oldenburg
- Died: 24 September 1575 (aged 73); Emden
- Burial: Great Church of Emden
- Spouse: Enno II of East Frisia (m. 1530)
- Issue Detail: Elisabeth of East Frisia; Edzard II of East Frisia; Hedwig of East Frisia; Anna of East Frisia; Christopher I of East Frisia; Johan II of East Frisia
- House: House of Oldenburg
- Father: John V, Count of Oldenburg
- Mother: Anna of Anhalt-Zerbst
- Religion: Calvinism

Anna of Oldenburg (14 November 1501 – 24 September 1575) was a Countess consort of East Frisia as the spouse of Count Enno II of East Frisia. She was the Regent of East Frisia in 1542–1561 as the guardian for her minor sons, Johan II and Edzard II. Her reign lasted until 1561 and was generally supported by the Estates.

== Early life ==
Anna was born in Oldenburg as the only daughter of Count Johann ΧΙV von Oldenburg-Delmenhorst (1483-1526) and Princess Anna von Anhalt-Zerbst (1460-1531). She had four surviving brothers Johann VI, Georg, Christopher and Anton I.

She married count Enno II of East Frisia in 1530.

== Regency ==
In 1540, Enno II of East Frisia died, and was succeeded by their minor son, Edzard II. Anna was appointed regent of the regency government in 1542. Her chief advisor was her brother, count Christopher of Oldenburg.

The main characteristic of her policy towards the Reformation was an effort to balance the various confessions and allow them to coexist. She adhered to the faith herself, but saw that among the East Frisian nobility Lutheranism and Zwinglianism were about equally distributed. It was clear that a selection of one of these as the state religion of East Frisia, would not be enforceable. Catholics and Spiritualists were also allowed to practise their faith in East Frisia. Only under pressure from the emperor, was Baptism forbidden in 1549. The main church administrator at her court until 1550 was Polish reformer Jan Łaski.

She founded the police force in East Frisia (1545), reformed the legal system. Next to its administrative tasks, the Chancellery was given judiciary tasks. Councillors and legal scholars were added to the Chancellery to carry out these tasks. The Chancellery was mostly a court of appeals, but would also act a court of first instance in cases involving the nobility.

During Anna's rule, the armed conflict with the Lordships of Esens, Stedesdorf and Wittmund flared up one more time, when Count John II "the Mad" of Harlingerland seized a strip of land at the Accumer Deep. Anna took her case to the Reichskammergericht and to the Lower Rhenish-Westphalian Circle. The Circle arrested John, who had made many enemies, and he died in captivity in 1562.

In 1558, she abolished the law that the first born would succeed as sole ruler of the county; instead, power was to be shared between her three sons, Edzard, Christopher and Johan. This was meant to prevent Swedish dominance in view of the wedding between her son Edzard to princess Katharina Vasa of Sweden (1559). It also implied a continuation of the religious balance, with Johan being a Calvinist and Edzard being Lutheran and neither of them able to establish their faith as the only religion allowed in the county.

Her regency ended in 1561.

== Later life ==
The relationship between Edzard and Johan was not too good to begin with and it worsened after Christopher died in 1566. The power struggle between the brothers often blocked the exercise of their shared power; this greatly strengthened the nobility and the citizens of Emden.

Menso Alting had only been preacher at Emden for a short time, when Countess Anna died there on 24 September 1575. He held his first major funeral sermon when she was buried in the family vault in the Great Church in Emden, the Reformed church, locally known as the Moederkerk ("Mother Church").

After Johan's death in 1591 Edzard II became the sole ruler of the County of East Frisia, but his authority had been severely hit by the ongoing conflict. The weakening of the Count's house was one of the factors leading to the so-called "Emden Revolution".

== Issue ==
From her marriage to Count Enno II, she had six children:

- Elisabeth (born: 10 January 1531; died: 6 September 1555), married in 1553 Count John V of Holstein-Pinneberg (1531–60)
- Edzard II (born: 24 June 1532; died: 1 September 1599)
- Hedwig (born: 29 June 1535; died: 4 November 1616), married on 8 October 1562 Duke Otto II of Brunswick-Harburg (1528–1603)
- Anna (born: 3 January 1534; died: 20 May 1552)
- Christopher (born: 8 October 1536; died: 29 September 1566 in Komárom, Hungary)
- Johan (born: 29 September 1538; died: 29 September 1591)

== Ancestors ==
Ancestors of Anna of Oldenburg

16. Christian V of Oldenburg
8. Dietrich of Oldenburg
17. Agnes of Hohnstein-Heringen
4. Gerhard VI, Count of Oldenburg
18. Gerhard VI of Holstein-Rendsburg
9. Hedvig of Holstein
19. Catherine Elisabeth of Brunswick-Lüneburg
2. John V, Count of Oldenburg
20. Nicholas II, Count of Tecklenburg
10. Otto VII, Count of Tecklenburg
21. Anna Elisabeth of Moers
5. Adelaide of Tecklenburg
22. Eric I, Count of Hoya
11. Ermengard of Hoya-Nienburg
23. Helen of Brunswick-Lüneburg
1. Anna of Oldenburg
24. John II, Prince of Anhalt-Zerbst
12. Sigismund I, Prince of Anhalt-Dessau
25. Elisabeth of Henneberg-Schleusingen
6. George I, Prince of Anhalt-Dessau
26. Gebhard IX of Querfurt
13. Judith of Querfurt
27. Matilda of Schwarzburg-Blankenburg
3. Anna of Anhalt-Zerbst
28. Günther V, Count of Lindow-Ruppin
14. Albert VIII, Count of Lindow-Ruppin
29. Cordula of Wernigerode
7. Anna of Lindow-Ruppin
30. Jan I of Żagań
15. Anna of Sagan
31. Scholastika of Saxe-Wittenberg

== References and sources ==
- Heiko Ebbel Janssen: Gräfin Anna von Ostfriesland - eine hochadelige Frau der späten Reformationszeit (1540/42-1575). Ein Beitrag zu den Anfängen der reformierten Konfessionalisierung im Reich, Münster, 1998, 285 pages, ISBN 3-402-03802-1
- Henning P. Jürgens: Die vormundschaftliche Regentschaft der Gräfin Anna und die Berufung Johannes a Lascos zum ostfriesischen Superintendenten, in: Emder Jahrbuch, vol. 79, 1999, pp. 42–65
- Ernst Friedländer (1875). "Anna, Gräfin von Ostfriesland" . Allgemeine Deutsche Biographie (in German). Vol. 1. Leipzig: Duncker & Humblot. pp. 468–469.

Anna of Oldenburg House of Oldenburg Born: 14 November 1501 in Oldenburg Died: 24 September 1575 in Emden
Regnal titles
| Preceded by Enno II | Regent of East Frisia; 1540–1561 | Succeeded by Edzard II |
| Vacant Title last held by Elisabeth of Rietberg | Countess of East Frisia; 1530–1540 | Vacant Title next held by Catherine Vasa |
