= John III of Rietberg =

Count of Rietberg

John III
- Count of Rietberg
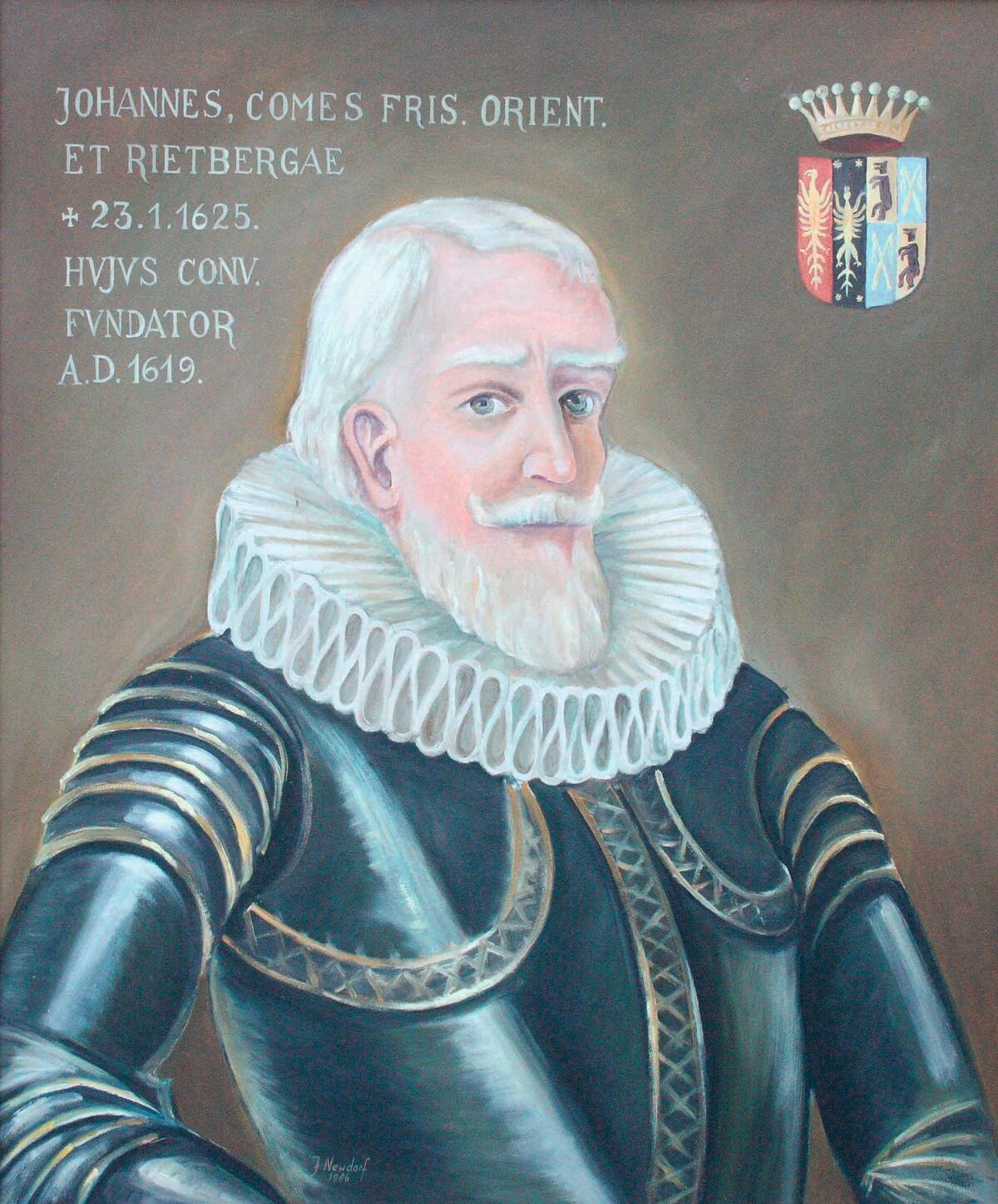
- John III, Count of Rietberg

Count of Rietberg
- Reign: 3 March 1601 - 23 January 1625
- Predecessor: Sabina Catharina of East Frisia
- Successor: Ernest Christopher
- Alongside: Sabina Catharina of East Frisia (1601–1618)
- Born: 1566; Aurich
- Died: 23 January 1625 (aged 58–59); Rietberg
- Spouse: Sabina Catherine of East Frisia
- House: Cirksena
- Father: Edzard II, Count of East Frisia
- Mother: Katarina Vasa

John III of Rietberg (1566, Aurich – 23 January 1625, Rietberg) was a member of the Cirksena family. He founded the Catholic side line of the Cirksena in the Westphalian County of Rietberg, the so-called house of East Frisia.

He was a son of Count Edzard II of East Frisia and Princess Katarina of Sweden, and a younger brother of Count Enno III of East Frisia.

John married in 1601 with Sabina Catherine, the daughter of his brother Enno III. Under the Treaty of Berum, Sabina Catherine had been awarded the County of Rietberg, which her mother Walburgis had brought into the Cirksena family. John had converted to the Roman Catholic faith at an early age, and needed papal dispensation to marry his niece.

Sabina Catherine converted to Catholicism in 1601. Together, they reverted the reformation in the county of Rietberg. That he didn't convert only for political reasons, was made evident when he founded a Franciscan monastery in Rietberg. Being a catholic, John could make his career in the imperial service. He became an officer in the imperial army and later in the Spanish army. John conquered the Prince-Bishopric of Paderborn, which had turned Protestant, committing atrocities against the population in the process.

After Sabina Catherine died in childbirth giving birth to her eleventh child, in 1618, John ruled Rietberg alone until his death in 1625.

== Marriage and issue ==
John III was married to Sabina Catherine Cirksena, heiress of the county of Rietberg. They had eleven children:

- Edzard (born 2 February 1602 – died 28 March 1603)
- Anna Walburgis (born: 27 October 1603 – died: 29 November 1604)
- Maria Catherine (born: 28 October 1604), married to the Marquis de Warenbon
- Ernest Christopher, (born: 1 April 1606 – died: 31 December 1640), Count of Rietberg 1625–1640, Vice Marshal, married Margravine Albertine Maria of St. Martin
- Philip Enno (born: 23 March 1608 – died: 14 May 1636), a canon of Cologne, Strasbourg and Paderborn
- Leopold (born: 23 November 1609 – died: 14 November 1635), a canon of Cologne, Strasbourg and Paderborn
- Walburgis Maria (born: 8 May 1612 – died: 13 June 1613)
- Francis Ferdinand (born: 4 October 1613 – died: 27 June 1648), a canon of Cologne, Magdeburg, Strasbourg and Halberstadt
- Clara Sophia (born: 7 March 1615)
- Anna Clara (born: 30 May 1616, †?)
- John IV (born: 31 May 1618 – died: 7 August 1660), Count of Rietberg 1640–1660, married to Countess Anna Catherine of Salm-Reifferscheidt. They had issue.

== Ancestors ==
Ancestors of John III of Rietberg

16. Ulrich I, Count of East Frisia
8. Edzard I, Count of East Frisia
17. Theda Ukena
4. Enno II, Count of East Frisia
18. John I, Count of Rietberg
9. Elisabeth of Rietberg
19. Margaret of Lippe
2. Edzard II, Count of East Frisia
20. Gerhard VI, Count of Oldenburg
10. John V, Count of Oldenburg
21. Adelheid of Tecklenburg
5. Anna of Oldenburg
22. George I, Prince of Anhalt-Dessau
11. Anna of Anhalt-Zerbst
23. Anna of Lindow-Ruppin
1. Johan III, Count of Rietberg
24. Johan Kristiernsson Vasa
12. Erik Johansson Vasa
25. Birgitta Gustafsdotter Sture
6. Gustav I of Sweden
26. Magnus Karlsson Eka
13. Cecilia Månsdotter
27. Sigrid Eskilsdotter Banér
3. Catherine of Sweden
28. Abraham Kristiernsson Leijonhufvud
14. Erik Abrahamsson Leijonhufvud
29. Birgitta Månsdotter Natt och Dag
7. Margaret Leijonhufvud
30. Erik Karlsson Vasa
15. Ebba Eriksdotter Vasa
31. Anna Karlsdotter (Vinstorpa)
