= Edzard II of East Frisia =

Count of East Frisia (1532–1599)

Edzard II
- Count of East Frisia
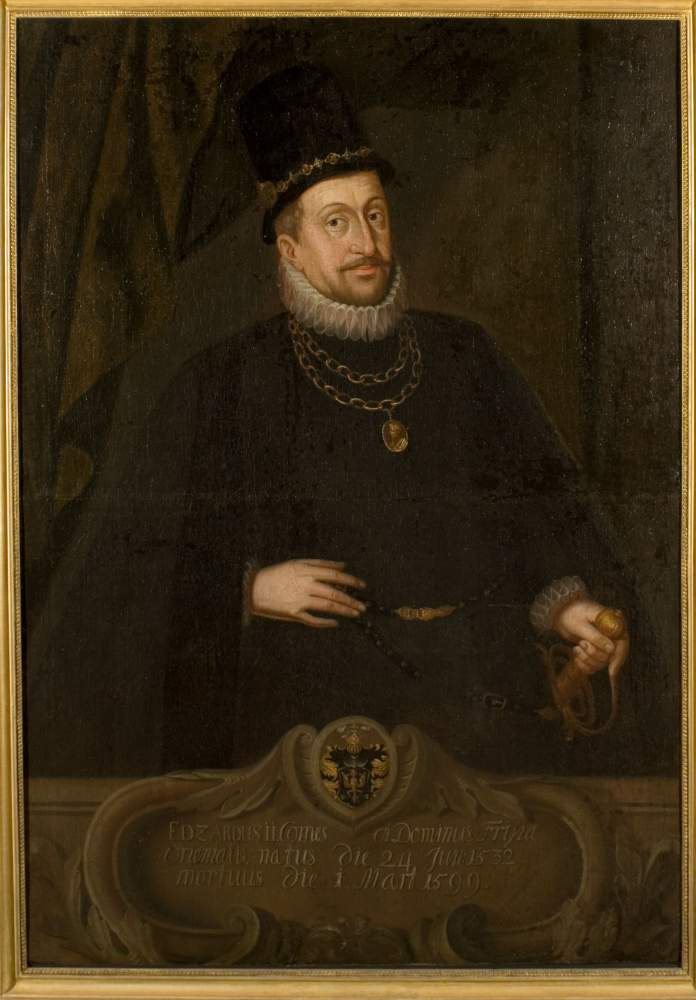
- Edzard II, Count of East Frisia

Count of East Frisia
- Reign: 1561 - 1 March 1599
- Predecessor: Anna of Oldenburg (as regent)
- Successor: Enno III; Catherine (at Norden and Berum)
- Alongside: Johan II (1561–1591)
- Born: 24 June 1532; Greetsiel
- Died: 1 March 1599 (aged 66); Aurich
- Spouse: Catherine of Sweden
- House: Cirksena
- Father: Enno II of East Frisia
- Mother: Anna of Oldenburg
- Religion: Lutheranism

Edzard II (24 June 1532 – 1 March 1599) was Count of East Frisia from 1561 to 1599. He was the son of Enno II of East Frisia and Anna of Oldenburg.

During his reign, Edzard came into conflict with the city of Emden. Edzard was a staunch Lutheran while the city of Emden was mostly Calvinistic. In 1595 Emden revolted and, after an intercession by the Calvinistic Dutch Republic, Edzard was forced to accept a large degree of independence from Emden.

== Life ==
Edzard II had a dispute with his dominant mother, Anna. She had abolished his right of primogeniture, in an attempt to curb the influence of the Swedish royal family. She decreed that Edzard should rule East Frisia jointly with his younger brothers Johan and Christopher. When Christopher died early, Edzard ran into a strong and almost hateful rivalry with his brother Johan II. The power struggle between two increasingly hamstrung their government. After Johan died in 1591, Edzard became the sole ruler, but his authority had been severely hit by the ongoing conflict.

At the request of the Estates, Edzard founded the High Court in Aurich in 1593.

In 1595, the city of Emden revolted. In the course of this Emden Revolution, the Cirksena family were driven out of Emden. Under pressure from the Dutch States General, Edzard signed on 5 July 1595 the Treaty of Delfzijl, which gave Emden a large degree of independence.

During Edzard's reign, the Counts of East Frisia definitively lost the Lordship of Jever. Maria of Jever, the last baroness, died and left her territory to the Counts of Oldenburg.

Edzard died on 1 March 1599. The Great Church at Emden refused to allow him to be buried in the Cirksena family vault, because he was a Lutheran and it was a Reformed church. He was buried on 13 May 1599 in the St. Lambert Church in Aurich. He was the first member of the Cirksena family to be buried there. However, all later family members were buried in this church, until the family died out in 1744.

== Marriage and issue ==
Married to Katarina Vasa, daughter of King Gustav I of Sweden, on October 1, 1559, in Stockholm. He was the only ruler of East Frisia who ever married a princess. Through this marriage, the Swedish royal family sought to secure their influence on the North Sea coast.

They had the following children:

1. Margareta of East Frisia, 1560–1588
2. Anna of East Frisia, 1562–1621, married:
  1. in Heidelberg, on 12 July 1583, Louis VI, Elector Palatine (1539–1583)
  2. on 21 December 1585, Ernest Frederick, Margrave of Baden-Durlach (1560–1604)
  3. in Grabow, on 7 March 1617, Julius Henry, Duke of Saxe-Lauenburg (1586–1665)
3. Enno III of East Frisia, 1563–1625, married
  1. on 29 January 1589, Walburgis, Countess of Rietberg, daughter of John II, Count of Rietberg
  2. in Esens, on 28 January 1598, Anna of Holstein-Gottorp, daughter of Adolf, Duke of Holstein-Gottorp
4. Gustav of East Frisia, 1565-1608
5. Johan III of East Frisia, born 1566, died 29 September 1625, married:
  1. on 4 March 1601, his niece Countess Sabina Catherine of Rietberg, daughter of his brother Enno III
6. Christopher of East Frisia, 1569–1636, married:
  1. on 13 August 1613, Lambertine de Ligne (1593–1651)
7. Edzard of East Frisia, 1572?-1573
8. Elizabeth of East Frisia, 1572?-1573
9. Sophia of East Frisia, 1574–1630
10. Karl Otto of East Frisia, 1577–1603.
11. Maria of East Frisia, 1582–1616, married:
  1. on 1 September 1614, Julius Ernst of Braunschweig-Dannenberg (1571–1636); she was his first wife

Edzard II was an ancestor of Queens Elizabeth II and Beatrix of the Netherlands.

== Ancestors ==
Ancestors of Edzard II of East Frisia

16. Enno Edzardisna
8. Ulrich I of East Frisia
17. Gela of Manslagt
4. Edzard I, Count of East Frisia
18. Uko Fockena
9. Theda Ukena
19. Heba Attena
2. Enno II of East Frisia
20. Conrad V, Count of Rietberg
10. John I, Count of Rietberg
21. Jacoba of Neuenahr
5. Elisabeth of Rietberg
22. Bernard VII, Lord of Lippe
11. Margaret of Lippe
23. Anna of Holstein-Schauenburg
1. Edzard II, Count of East Frisia
24. Dietrich of Oldenburg
12. Gerhard VI, Count of Oldenburg
25. Hedvig of Holstein
6. John V, Count of Oldenburg
26. Otto VII, Count of Tecklenburg
13. Adelheid of Tecklenburg
27. Ermengard of Hoya-Nienburg
3. Anna of Oldenburg
28. Sigismund I, Prince of Anhalt-Dessau
14. George I, Prince of Anhalt-Dessau
29. Judith of Querfurt
7. Anna of Anhalt-Zerbst
30. Albert VIII, Count of Lindow-Ruppin
15. Anna of Lindow-Ruppin
31. Anna of Sagan

== Footnotes ==
Edzard II of East Frisia Cirksena Born: 24 June 1532 Died: 1 March 1599
Preceded by Anna of Oldenburg as Regent	Count of East Frisia; 1561–1599	Succeeded by Enno III
