= Johan II of East Frisia =

Count of East Friesland

Johan II

Count of East Frisia
- Reign: 1561 - 29 September 1591
- Predecessor: Anna of Oldenburg (as regent)
- Successor: Edzard II (as sole ruler)
- Alongside: Edzard II (1561–1591)
- Born: 29 September 1538; Aurich
- Died: 29 September 1591 (aged 53); Stickhausen Castle
- House: Cirksena
- Father: Enno II of East Frisia
- Mother: Anna of Oldenburg
- Religion: Calvinism

Count Johan II of East Frisia (29 September 1538, Aurich – 29 September 1591, Stickhausen Castle) was a member of the House of Cirksena and from 1561 until his death in 1591 co-regent of the county of East Frisia. He ruled jointly with his brother Edzard II.

In 1558 the primogeniture of John's mother, the Countess Anna was abolished, presumably to stem the impact of the house Vasa in the county, which was based on the marriage of her eldest son Edzard with Catherine Vasa of Sweden, the eldest daughter of King Gustav I of Sweden. This meant that she abolished Edzard right to be the sole ruler of the county. This led to a de facto division of East Frisia, because Johan, like his mother, was a Calvinist, whereas Edzard II was a Lutheran.

== Life ==
In 1559, his brother Edzard took Johan to his wedding in Stockholm, where Johan had an affair with Cecilia, the daughter of King Gustav I Vasa (and therefore his sister-in-law). He was caught and was nearly sentenced to death if it hadn't been for the intercession of the Queen Elizabeth I. This scandal would go down in history as the 'Vadstena Rumble'. Johan never married after that.

After the death of their brother Christoffel in 1566, the power struggle between Johan and Edzard worsened. Johan blocked Edzard's exercise of sovereign power and strengthened the nobility and the citizens of Emden. Ultimately, this struggle provided the foundation for the coexistence of faiths in East Frisia: since none of them could prevail over the other, the Lutheran Edzard failed to establish the Lutheran church as the only church allowed in the county.

After Johan died in 1591, Edzard finally became the sole ruler of the County of East Frisia, but his authority had been severely hit by the ongoing conflict. This was a substantial factor, which eventually contributed to the so-called Emden Revolution.

== Ancestors ==
Ancestors of Johan II of East Frisia

16. Enno Edzardisna
8. Ulrich I of East Frisia
17. Gela of Manslagt
4. Edzard I, Count of East Frisia
18. Uko Fockena
9. Theda Ukena
19. Heba Attena
2. Enno II of East Frisia
20. Conrad V, Count of Rietberg
10. John I, Count of Rietberg
21. Jacoba of Neuenahr
5. Elisabeth of Rietberg
22. Bernard VII, Lord of Lippe
11. Margaret of Lippe
23. Anna of Holstein-Schauenburg
1. Johan II, Count of East Frisia
24. Dietrich of Oldenburg
12. Gerhard VI, Count of Oldenburg
25. Hedvig of Holstein
6. John V, Count of Oldenburg
26. Otto VII, Count of Tecklenburg
13. Adelheid of Tecklenburg
27. Ermengard of Hoya-Nienburg
3. Anna of Oldenburg
28. Sigismund I, Prince of Anhalt-Dessau
14. George I, Prince of Anhalt-Dessau
29. Judith of Querfurt
7. Anna of Anhalt-Zerbst
30. Albert VIII, Count of Lindow-Ruppin
15. Anna of Lindow-Ruppin
31. Anna of Sagan

== References and Sources ==
- Martin Tielke (ed.): Biographisches Lexikon für Ostfriesland. Ostfriesische Landschaft, Aurich 1993, ISBN 3-925365-75-3.

Johan II of East Frisia Cirksena Born: 29 September 1538 Died: 29 September 1591
Preceded by Anna	Count of East Frisia; 1561–1591	Succeeded by Edzard II
