= Vadstena Rumble =

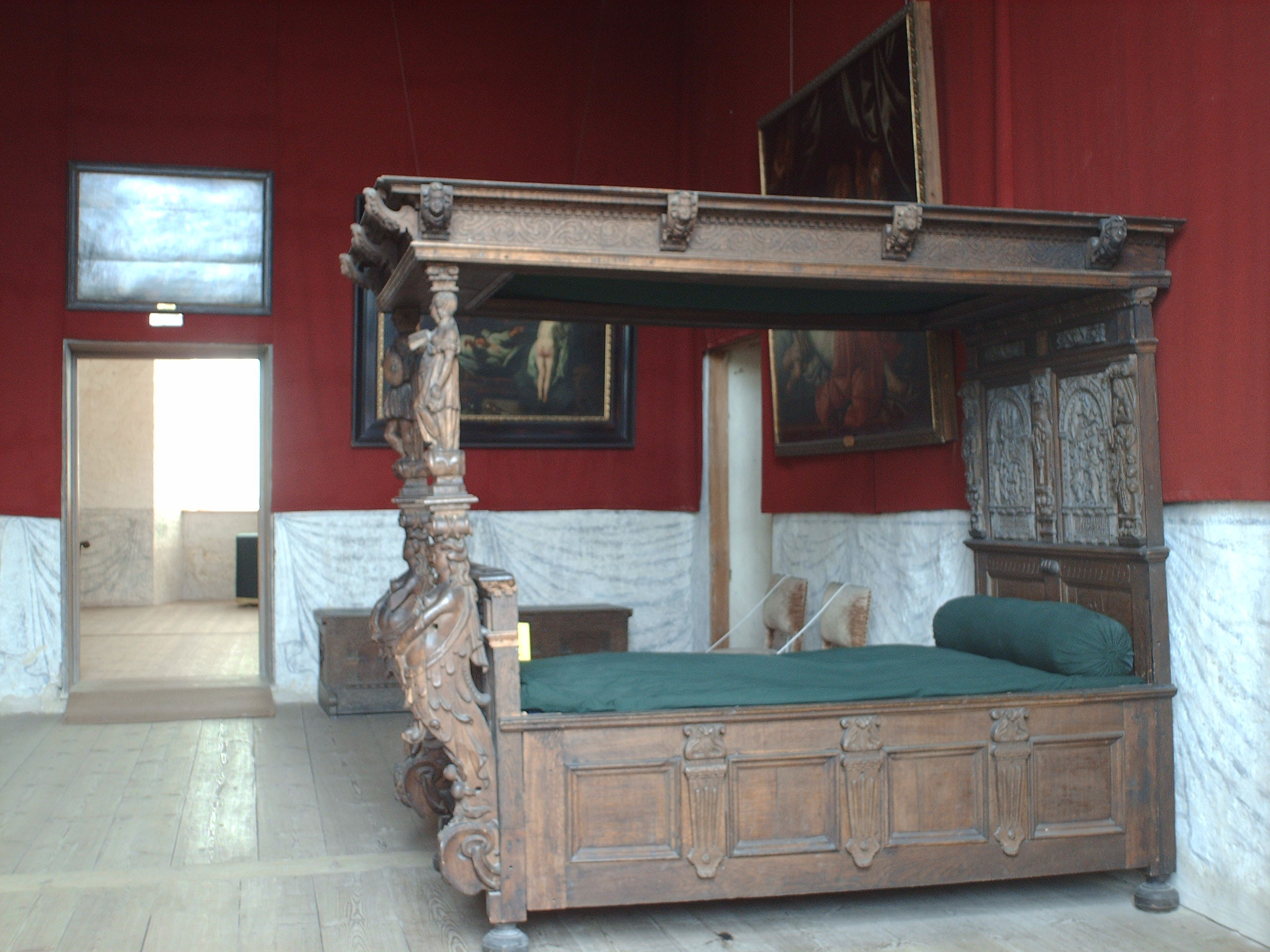
A bedchamber at Vadstena Castle, although not where the "rumble" took place.

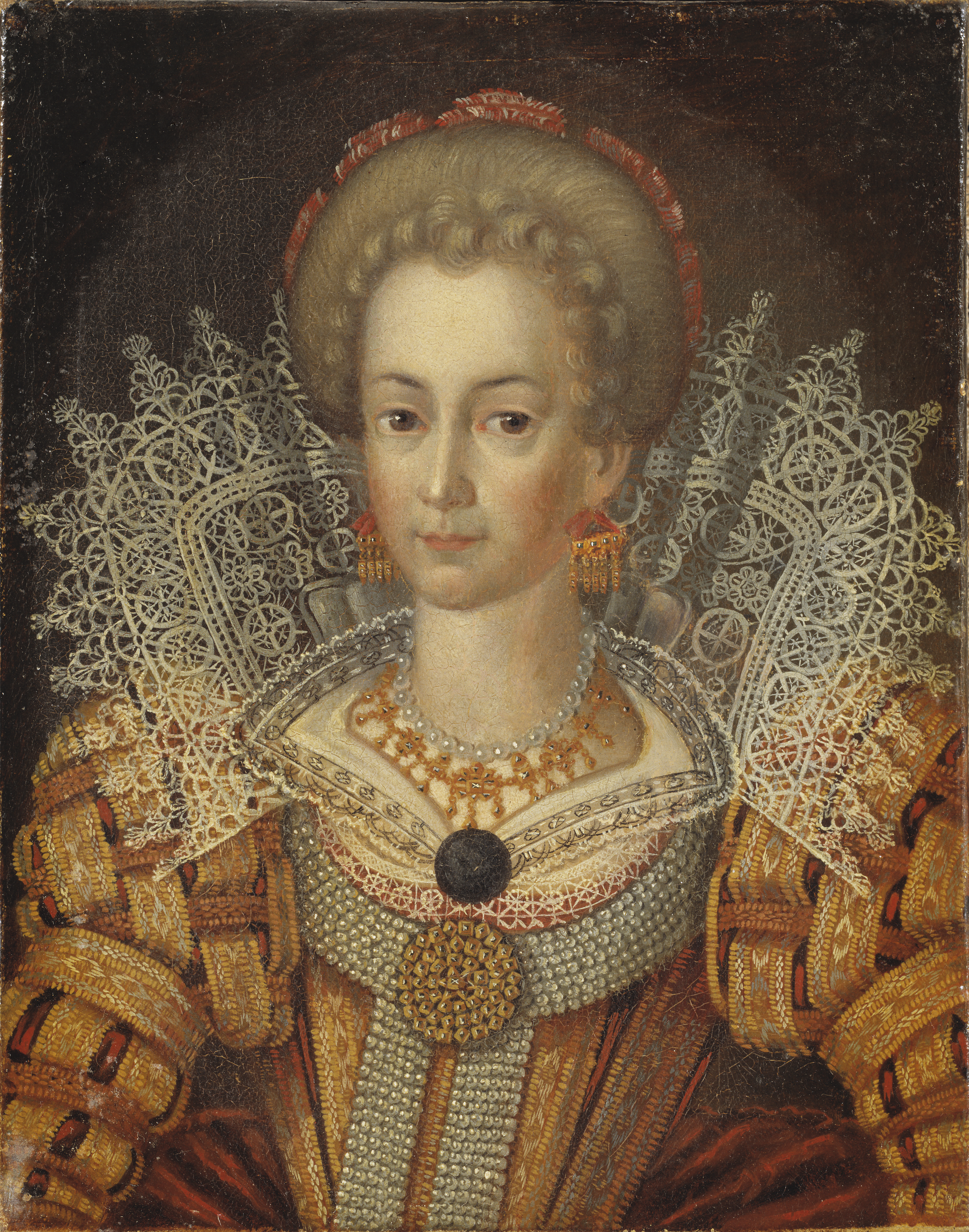
Princess Cecilia of Sweden.

The Vadstena Rumble is the name given to the scandal that took place at Vadstena Castle on the night of December 17, 1559. The "rumble" refers to the scandal when the then nineteen-year-old Swedish Princess Cecilia Vasa was caught with Johan II of East Frisia in the princess's bedchamber.

== The course of events ==
=== Background information ===
On 1 October, Cecilia's older sister Catherine had married Edzard II of East Frisia in Stockholm. The groom's younger brother, Johan II of East Frisia (1538–1591), also attended the wedding festivities. Cecilia stood out among the bridesmaids, and the poets praised her as "the most beautiful". "Her forehead is white as snow, her eyes shine like the sun, her gentle lips are fairer than roses, her locks shine more beautifully than gold", wrote a German poet. Cecilia and Johan took a liking to each other and both accompanied the entourage through Sweden when the bride and groom were to head back to East Frisia. At Vadstena Castle, where the brother of Cecilia and Catherine, Magnus, resided, they were to stop for Christmas celebrations.

=== At Vadstena Castle ===
After a festive evening on 13 December, when everyone had gone to their rooms, a guard saw Johan climb a rope ladder and enter through Cecilia's window. Duke Erik, who was in the castle, was informed of the nocturnal visitor. The next night, a watchful eye was kept on Cecilia's window, and that night Johan also crept in through the window. Then the ladder was removed, and the princess's courtier and some other gentlemen rushed into Cecilia's chamber and seized Johan, according to Erik's letter to his brother, in his shirt, barely wearing his trousers.

In the letter, Erik continues:

“And although we could not think that what he had entered there had been done for the sake of our sister, but rather for the sake of some maiden who was lying there, a suspicion was nevertheless given to us; and since we knew well before that her Love had much to order with the Count Johan both in conversation and socializing — although we had often discouraged her love from that before —, we conceived something else, wherefore we could not suffer such arrogance of his but immediately had him adopted and sent well cared for to the King's Majesty, our dear father.„

Johan was thrown into prison and according to tradition he is also said to have been castrated on Duke Erik's orders.

=== Aftermath ===
The incident got its name because the Swedish royal family (which had previously been very good at keeping scandals quiet) let this story spread among the population. King Gustav Vasa blamed his son Duke Erik for letting the story spread to the "common" people instead of just throwing Johan of East Frisia into the dungeon and then not talking about it again.

Gustav Vasa's secretary Sven Elofsson described how the king stood talking to his queen about the incident a short time later. The secretary then saw "the tears from his eyes rolling down his cheekbones; not that he was afraid or cowardly, but he was so worried about it in his heart that the talk about it forced the tears out of his eyes". The king severely rebuked his son for his actions: he had treated his own sister "like a clear harlot" and thrown Count Johan into prison.

Erik now completely changed tack and acted as his sister's defender before his father. He reproached the king for his severity towards his daughter and went so far in his accusations that he claimed that his father had beaten her and "torn all the hair off her head". Against these accusations, Gustav Vasa defended himself in a letter to Erik in which he explained that this "was not true, but her hair did fall out anyway, as many people know".

Johan of East Frisia was released from prison after many negotiations after several months and was able to return home. The release took place a week before Gustav Vasa's death, after repeated prayers by Johan's relatives and several German princes, and after the count swore that nothing had happened between him and the king's daughter that was against discipline and honor. Johan thereafter lived a secluded life and never married. He is said to have devoted the rest of his life to protecting Dutch Protestants who were persecuted for their faith by the Catholics.

Due to the complications and the fact that her father Gustav Vasa died in September 1560 and was buried in December of the same year, Catherine was forced to stay in Sweden until 1561 before she could travel to East Frisia.

Later historiography has taken a more lenient view of Erik's actions during the incident. He himself defended his decision by saying that the scandal could not be hushed up because it was already well-known: "Almost everyone in the city knew it," Erik wrote. Merely making accusations without irrefutable evidence would have resulted in the guilty party denying everything. By catching the count red-handed, Erik had, in the worst-case scenario, the opportunity to save his sister's honor by marrying the seducer. At the same time, he advised his father to "seriously examine the maidens and maids who were with Cecilia," and who had in any case been in collusion with the two lovers. If any of these women could be persuaded to admit that Count Johan had come there for her sake and not for the princess's, the king could forgive her. At the same time, according to Erik, Count Johan should publicly assure that although he had acted carelessly, he had "not done anything dishonest there".

== Sources ==
- Fridolf Ödberg. Om prinsessan Cecilia Wasa, markgrefvinna af Baden-Rodemachern. Anteckningar. Stockholm 1896. 231 s.
- Georg Hahn: Hochzeit in Stockholm. Die Eheschließung Graf Edzards II. von Ostfriesland mit Prinzessin Katharina von Schweden im Jahre 1559 und die Vadstena-Affäre, Lunenburg 1991.
