= Johan II =

Johan II may refer to:

- Johan II, king of Sweden (1455–1513), Danish king who became king of Sweden during the Kalmar union 1497–1501
- Johan II of East Frisia (1538–1591)

== See also ==
- Johann II, Prince of Liechtenstein
