= Ernest Christopher, Count of Rietberg =

Count of Rietberg (1625-1640)

- Born: 1 April 1606
- Died: 31 December 1640 (aged 34)
- Buried: Church of the Franciscan monastery in Rietberg
- Noble family: Cirksena
- Spouse: Albertine Maria Marquise de St. Martin
- Father: John III of Rietberg
- Mother: Sabina Catherine of East Frisia

Ernest Christopher, Count of Rietberg (1 April 1606 – 31 December 1640) was a member of the house of Cirksena and became Count of Rietberg in 1625.

Christopher was the fourth of the eleven children of John III and his wife, Sabina Catherine. Since his elder brother Edzard had died young, he was heir apparent of Rietberg from the day he was born.

Shortly before his father's death, Christopher promised to build a Franciscan monastery in Rietberg. His father died in 1625 and he took up government. On 10 November 1626, he married Albertine Maria Marquise de St. Martin; this marriage remained childless. On 6 January 1629, he founded a Franciscan monastery, as he had promised. Its church was consecrated later that year and his parents' bodies reinterred in its crypt.

In 1631, Christopher was appointed colonel of the cavalry. He was later promoted to vice-marshall and on 8 March 1634, to imperial major general. He died on 31 December 1640, his body interred in the family crypt. His widow married Charles de la Baume. In 1645, his brother, Francis Ferdinand, began a court case before the Reichskammergericht to reverse some donations Christopher had made to his wife.

Ernest Christopher, Count of Rietberg Cirksena Born: 1 April 1606 Died: 31 December 1640
Preceded by John III	Count of Rietberg; 1625–1640	Succeeded by John IV
