= Anne of Ostfriesland =

- Electress of the Palatinate
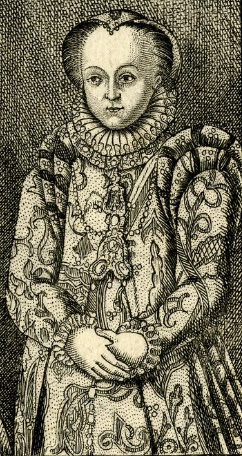
- Born: 26 June 1562; Aurich
- Died: 21 April 1621 (aged 58); Neuhaus upon Elbe
- Noble family: Cirksena
- Father: Edzard II of East Frisia
- Mother: Catherine Vasa of Sweden

Anne of Ostfriesland (June 26, 1562 – April 21, 1621) was the eldest daughter of Count Edzard II of East Frisia and his wife, Catherine Vasa, daughter of Gustav I of Sweden. Widowed twice, through her various marriages she was Electress Palatine, Margravine of Baden-Durlach, and Duchess of Saxe-Lauenburg.

Anne married three times:

- First, on July 12, 1583, in Heidelberg, to the Elector Palatine, Louis VI. He died on October 22 of the same year.
- Second, Anne remarried on December 21, 1585, Ernest Frederick, Margrave of Baden-Durlach. He died April 14, 1604.
- Third, Anne married on March 7, 1617, in Grabow, Julius Henry, later Duke of Saxe-Lauenburg. The duke was 26 years younger than his wife and outlived her by many decades, dying on November 20, 1665.

Anne had no living children by any of her husbands.
