= Emden Revolution =

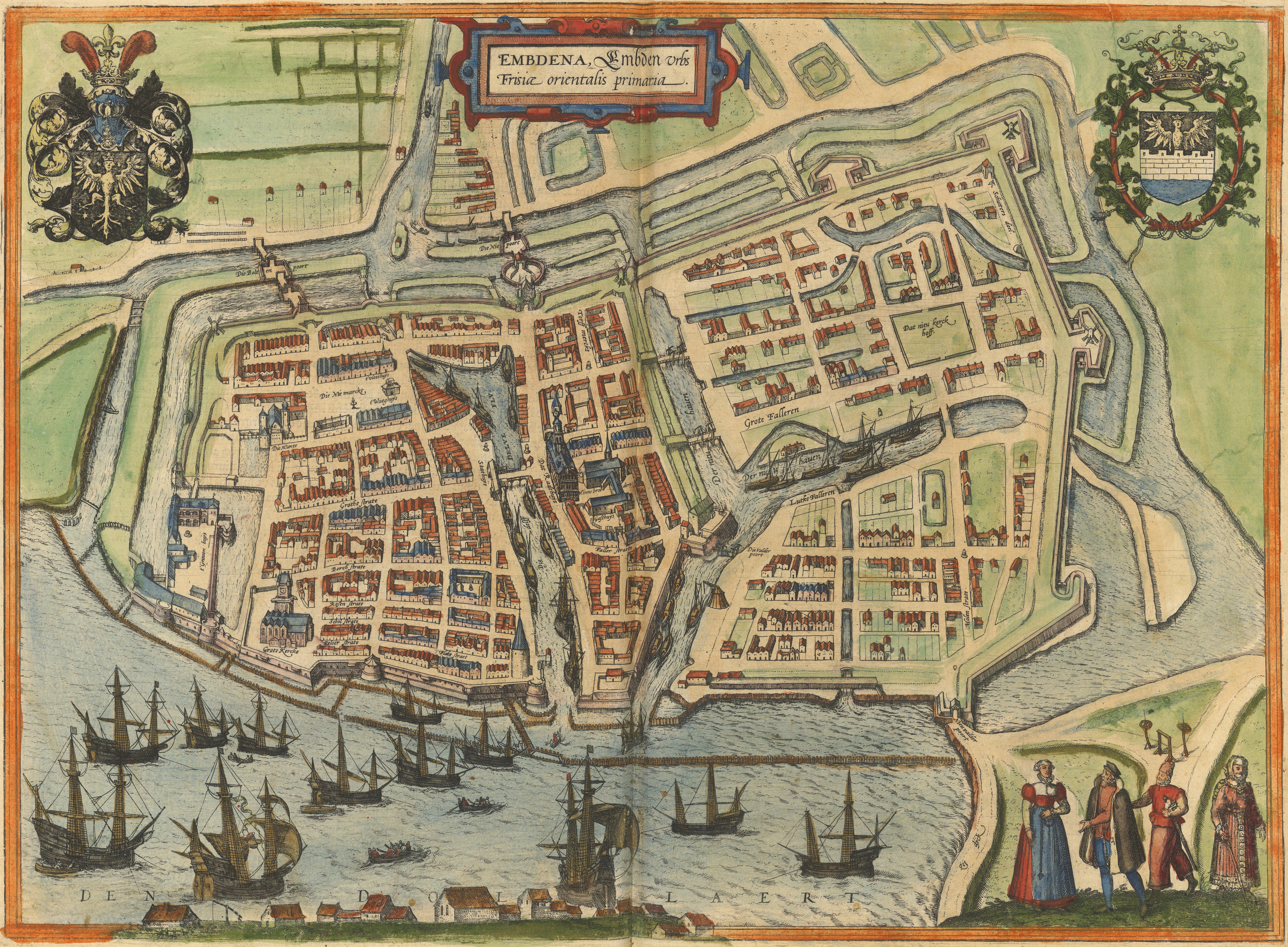
Emden in 1575

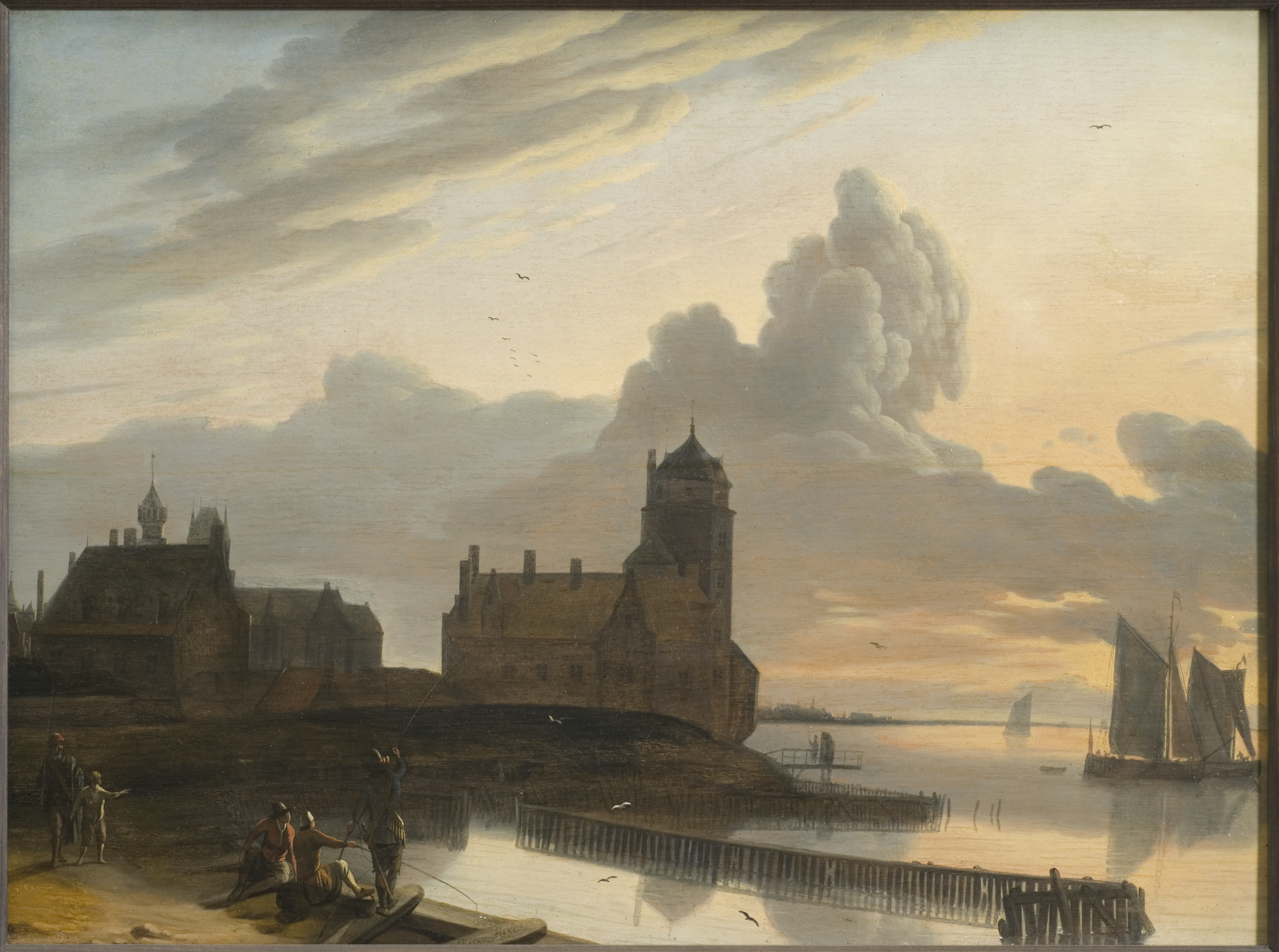
The castle in Emden (Emderburg) by Gerrit Berckheyde

The Emden Revolution of 18 March 1595 marked the beginning of the status of Emden as a quasi-autonomous city-state.

In 1595, after Count Edzard II had increased the tax burden several times and passed new laws, disregarding their effect on the citizens of Emden, the citizens revolted. They removed the city council, which Edzard II had appointed from office and occupied the count's castle. Edzard II was forced to move his residence to Aurich. Under the terms of the Treaty of Delfzijl of 15 July 1595, Edzard had to renounce most of his rights in Emden.

== Background ==
In the late 16th century, Emden took in many Calvinist refugees from the Spanish Netherlands and developed into a major port city of European importance, mainly because the warring Dutch and Spanish forces blocked each other's ports. Emden developed into a major transshipment point for grain imports to Westphalia. At the same time, the integration of the Calvinist refugees marked East Frisian society economically and religiously.

After the 1609 truce between Spain and the rebellious Netherlands, the port blockades were lifted and many refugees returned home. This led to an economic depression in Emden.

At the same time, tensions arose between the East Frisian town of Emden and Count Edzard II. The real reason was the arbitrary taxation by the count. As so often in history, the tensions exploded in a veritable religious conflict. Edzard's mother Anna had abolished the primogeniture in 1558, and decreed that the government of the county should be run jointly by her three sons, Edzard, Christopher and John. The goal of this decree was probably to dam the influence of the House of Vasa on the county. This influence was founded on the marriage between her eldest son Edzard and Catherine Vasa, the eldest daughter of King Gustav I of Sweden. This led to a religious division in the county, as John, like his mother and the majority of the citizens of Emden, was a Calvinist whereas Edzard was Lutheran.

Count John was very popular in the city, because he was a prominent advocate of the Reformed Church in the Countly family. Things changed after John died in 1591. Menso Alting, the reformed vicar in the Great Church in Emden, became a leading opponent of the power ambitions of count Edzard II. Menso Alting had a major influence on the enforcement of Calvinism in Emden. He tried to create a Protestant Union in the spirit of militant Calvinism as a defense against the Counter-Revolution. This got him involved in the conflict between the Netherlands and Spain, as well as the conflict between the East-Frisian Estates and the Lutheran Counts Edzard II and Enno III. Menso Alting cleverly used a tax increase by Edzard II to stir the population of Emden into action against Edzard II. Edzard II then asked the Emperor for assistance. On 21 January 1594, the Emperor issued a decree against the East Frisian Estates and against some citizens of Emden, in which they were asked:

- to recognize the Count as their ruler
- to pacify the city
- to hand over city hall to the Count
- to stop meeting
- to dissolve the college of forty

This appeal by the emperor encouraged the citizens of Emden to reject the authority of the Count. He had obviously lost his authority, and this triggered the revolution.

== Revolution ==
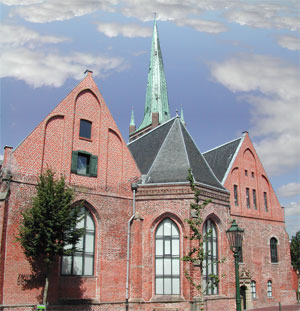
The former "Great Church" in Emden, now the Johannes a Lasco Library

On 18 March 1595, many people gathered in the Great Church in Emden. Menso Alting warmed them up with a sermon. Then Gerhard Bolardus, a member of the college of forty, held an impassioned speech, in which he called for the overthrow of the Count. Weapons were handed out, and the crowd moved to the town hall. They occupied the city walls and various strategic locations in the city. Following the example of other cities, 21 civil companies (later 23) were set up. Each company was led by a captain, a lieutenant and an ensign. These 21 captains and the four quartermasters of the Emden district formed the "Civil War Chamber". This was the birth of the Emden militia.

Alarmed by the news from Emden, Edzard II sent his secretary into the city to test the waters. Encouraged by Edzard's apparent lack of power, the citizens removed the count's mayor from power on 24 March 1595. The college of forty elected by the citizens grabbed power and appointed four new mayors and eight councillors. Edzard then sent his Chancellor to The Hague to ask the Dutch authorities where they stood in the conflict. On 2 April 1595, the Dutch offered to mediate. In the meantime, the conflict escalated on the East Frisian peninsula. On 2 April the citizens stormed the castle in Emden and demolished part of the castle on the city side. This forced Edzard to move his residence to Aurich. Ships from Emden were given orders to look out from troop movements in the area and raid Edzard's ships if necessary. Edzard's reaction showed his lack of power. He offered the States-General to join the Netherlands as its eighth province in return for military support. He stationed troops at the Knock peninsula, west of Emden, and ordered them to shoot at passing ships.

The citizens of Emden turned to the States-General for help. The States-General sent a reinforcement of 1000 men to the city. The Count saw no other option than to start negotiating with the city. On 7 November 1595, a peace treaty was signed in Delfzijl by the city, the count and the Estates.

This peace did not hold for very long. Tensions rose again and in 1600 civil war broke out between the city of Emden and the States-General on one side, and count Enno III and the rural parts of the county on the other side. On 4 October 1602, a battle began near the sconce at Logum, which Enno had built. The battle continued until 14 October and was won by the city. As the battle had clearly demonstrated the power relations in East Frisia, Enno III went into hiding until February 1603. While he was in hiding, the city held sovereignty over East Frisia, and collected taxes.

In February 1603, Enno III appeared in The Hague. The city of Emden then sent representatives to the States-General to conduct negotiations, which led to the Agreement of the Hague of 8 April 1603. The agreement confirmed the annexation by Emden of its suburbs. The city received tax sovereignty with the city limits, and the city magistrate became sovereign in military affairs. This meant that the city de facto became a free imperial city. The city would have a permanent garrison of 600 to 700 men, funded by the East Frisian estates. The commander of this garrison would be a Dutchman, who had not previously served either the Count or the city of Emden.

These were unequal negotiations. Enno III only participated because the States-General threatened war if he didn't. After hesitating for a while, he signed the agreement on 8 April 1603.

== Aftermath ==
The revolution freed Emden from the reign of the Cirksena family. Emden became a "satellite" of the Netherlands and de facto a free imperial city. The city was proud of this status, and henceforth signed all its official publications with S.P.Q.E. ("Senate and People of Emden"), after the Roman model. The city and the Reformed southwestern part of East Frisia built close ties with the Calvinist church in the Netherlands. During the 17th century, Dutch was the language of choice of the leading citizens of Emden.

However, the decline of the city had begun. Tolerance in matters of faith had disappeared and the Treaty of Greetsiel stipulated that only the Reformed religion could be taught in Emden. Activities in the harbour had declined, and only in 1800 would they again reach levels comparable to those of the 1670s.
