= Johann Heinrich Alting =

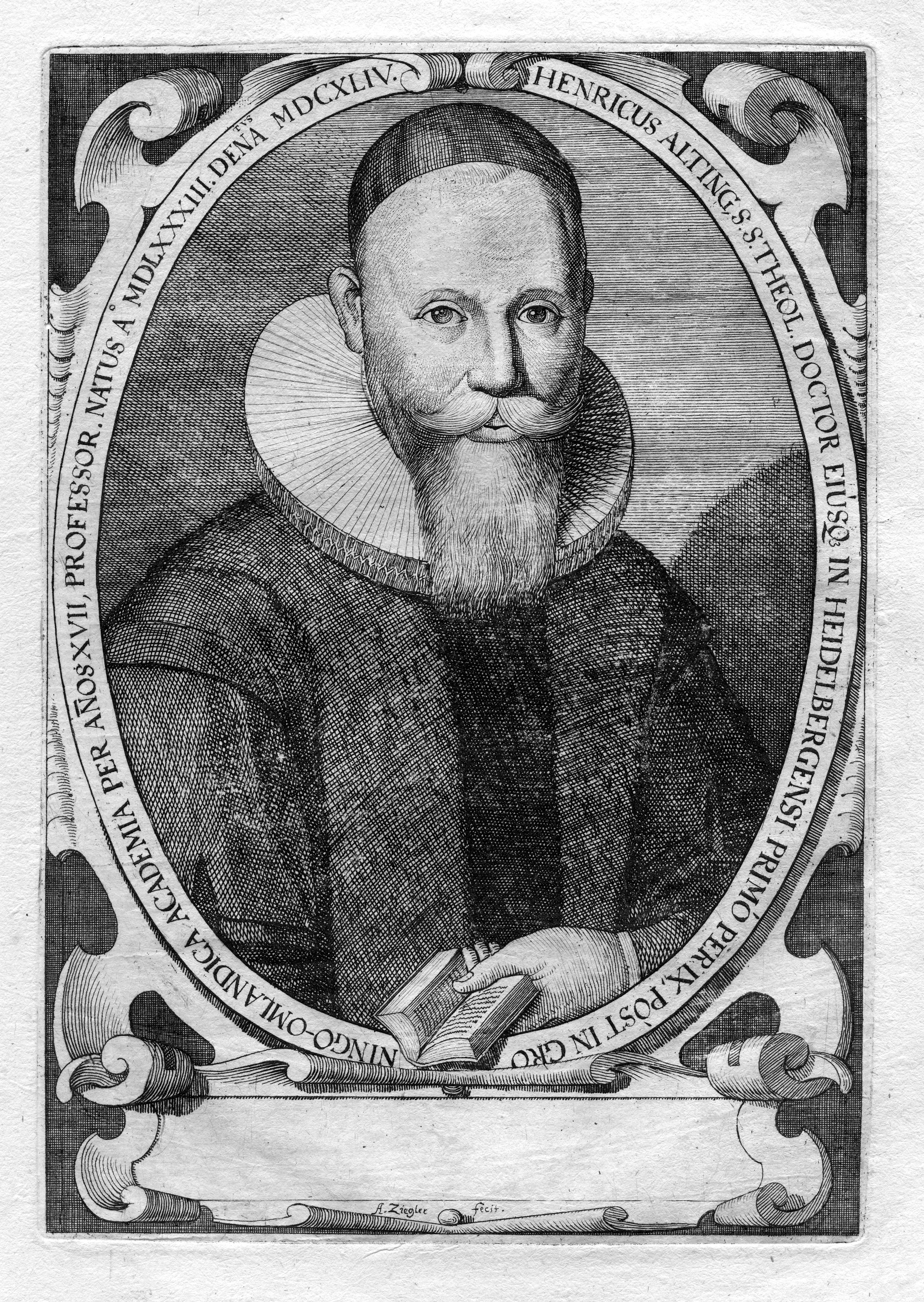
Johann Heinrich Alting

Johann Heinrich Alting (17 February 1583 – 25 August 1644), German Calvinist theologian, was born in Emden, where his father, Menso Alting (1541–1612), was minister.

== Biography ==
Heinrich studied with great success at the University of Groningen and the Herborn Academy. In 1608 he was appointed tutor of Frederick, afterwards elector-palatine, at Heidelberg, and in 1612 accompanied him to England. Returning in 1613 to Heidelberg, after the marriage of the elector with Princess Elizabeth of England, he was appointed professor of dogmatics, and in 1616 director of the theological department in the Collegium Sapientiae.

In 1618, along with Abraham Scultetus, he represented the university in the Synod of Dort. When Count Tilly took the city of Heidelberg (1622) and handed it over to plunder, Alting found great difficulty in escaping the fury of the soldiers. He first retired to Schorndorf; but, offended by the "semi-Pelagianism" of the Lutherans with whom he was brought in contact, he removed to Holland, where the unfortunate elector and "Winter King" Frederick, in exile after his brief reign in Bohemia, made him tutor to his eldest son.

In 1627, Alting was appointed to the chair of theology at the Groningen University, where he continued to lecture, with increasing reputation, until his death. Though an orthodox Calvinist, Alting laid little stress on the sterner side of his creed and, when at Dort he opposed the Remonstrants, he did so mainly on the ground that they were "innovators."

Alting made a fundamental contribution to the historiography of German Reformed Protestantism with his Historia de Ecclesiis Palatinis. Unfortunately the work included the doubtful assertion that Elector Frederick the Pious jointly commissioned Zacharias Ursinus and Caspar Olevianus to compose the Heidelberg Catechism. This dual authorship thesis has been rejected by serious scholarship since the 1960s but remains common in reference works. While this attribution has been set aside, Alting's work remains an irreplaceable source for reconstructing the history of the Reformation of the Palatinate.

He died in Groningen.

== Family ==
In 1614 Heinrich married Susanna Belier. They were the parents of the preacher Jacob Alting.

== Works ==
Among his works are:

- Notae in Decadem Problematum Jacobi Behm (Heidelberg, 1618)
- Scripta Theologica Heidelbergensia (Amsterdam, 1662)
- Exegesis Augustanae Confessionis (Amsterdam, 1647).
- Historia de Ecclesiis Palatinis (Groningen, 1728; originally published 1644).
