= Menso Alting =

Dutch Reformed preacher and reformer

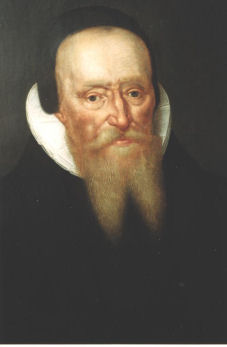
Menso Alting

Menso Alting (9 November 1541 – 7 October 1612) was a Dutch Reformed preacher and reformer.

== Biography ==
Alting was born in Eelde and was raised in a Catholic family. After visiting several schools in the Netherlands and Germany, he studied theology at Cologne. In 1564 he was named vicar to Haren. A few months later he was named pastor of Sleen. He probably never visited Sleen and Haren, instead using the functions, which had been given by influential family members, as a source of income.

In 1565, during his study, Alting joined the Protestant Reformation. He continued his studies in Heidelberg. After his study, he returned to Helpen, now a district of Groningen and Sleen, this time to convert the inhabitants to Calvinism.

As a result of the Protestant persecutions in the Netherlands after the Beeldenstorm, Alting fled to Germany in July 1567. Travelling through Leiselheim (at Worms), Dirmstein (at Frankenthal) and Heidelberg, he reached Emden in East-Frisia in 1575, when about half of the inhabitants were Protestant refugees from the Netherlands; an estimated 6000 Dutch people went to Emden during the second half of the 16th century.

In October 1575 Alting became preacher of the Great Church in Emden, as well as a political leader. He succeeded the Dutch reformer Albertus Risaeus, who died in 1574, and broke Calvinism through in Emden. Shortly after he became preacher, countess Anna von Oldenburg died, so he led her Calvinistic funeral services.

Count William Louis, stadtholder of Friesland, invited Alting to Drenthe in 1594 to preach. From this period he received his nickname, "The Reformer of Drenthe". He used a hunebed as pulpit for his sermons, which is still locally known as "The Popeless Church".

In March 1595, Alting played a large role in a rebellion of the Calvinistic inhabitants of Emden against the Lutheran count of East-Frisia, Edzard II. Hoping Emden would join the Dutch Republic, he roused the population. Not long after, the city declared itself independent of East-Frisia. In the treaty of Delfzijl of 15 July 1595, Emden received a semi-autonomous status, which it kept until 1744.

Alting died at the age of 70 in Emden.

== Family ==
In 1571, he married Maria Bisschop; they had 12 children, including the theologian Johann Heinrich Alting. Menso and Maria were also the grandparents of the preacher Jacob Alting.
