= Catherine Vasa of Sweden =

Countess consort of East Frisia (1539–1610)

Catherine Vasa
- Countess consort of East Frisia
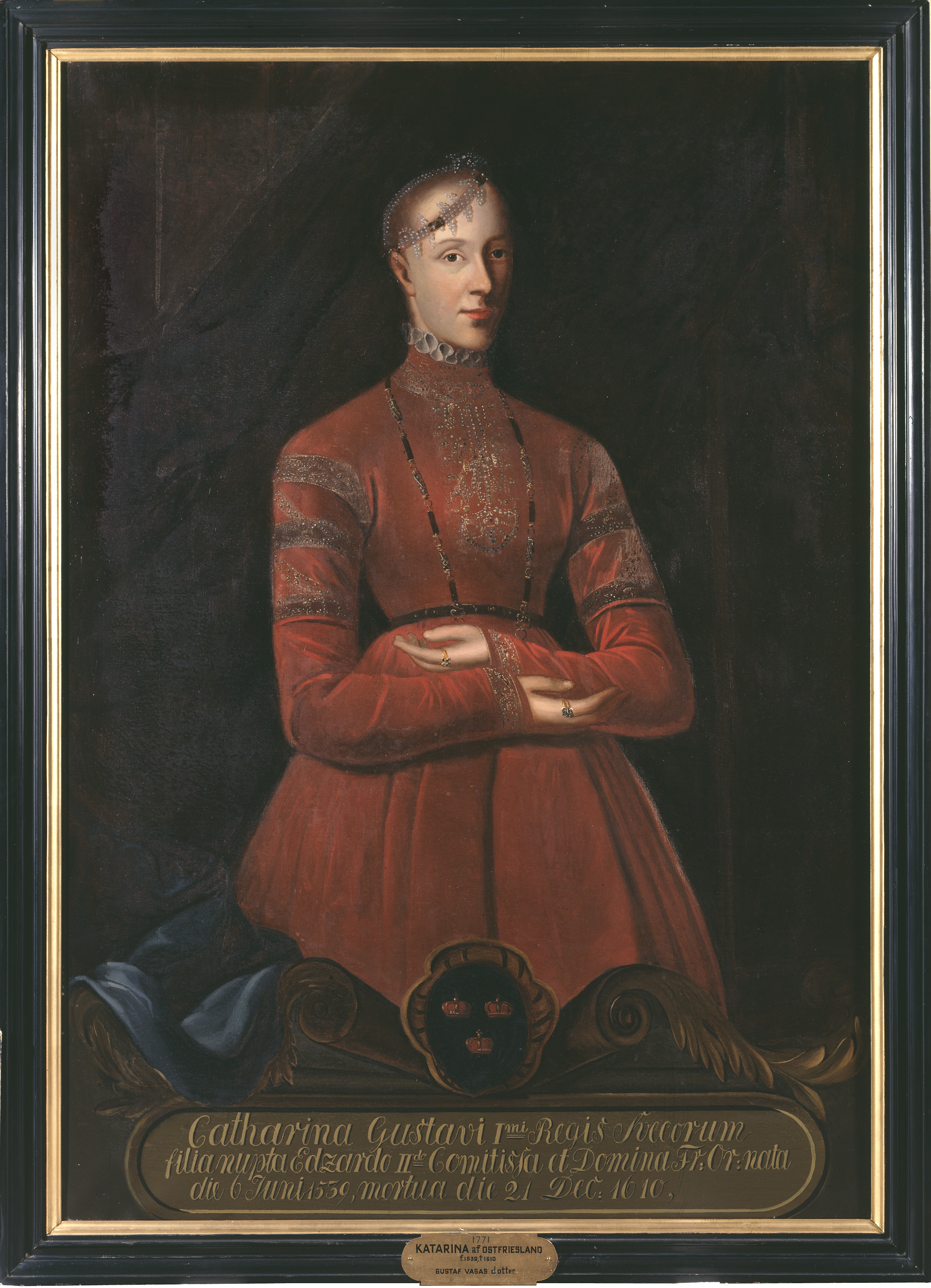
- Catherine, Countess of East Frisia

Countess consort of East Frisia
- Reign: 1561 - 1 March 1599
- Predecessor: Anna of Oldenburg
- Successor: Anna of Holstein-Gottorp

Countess of East Frisia (at Norden and Berum)
- Reign: 1 March 1599 - 21 December 1610
- Predecessor: Edzard II
- Successor: Enno III (as sole ruler)
- Alongside: Enno III (1599–1610)
- Born: 6 June 1539
- Died: 21 December 1610 (aged 71)
- Spouse: Edzard II, Count of East Frisia
- Issue: Margareta of East Frisia; Anne of East Frisia; Enno III of East Frisia; Gustav of East Frisia; Johan III of East Frisia; Christopher of East Frisia; Edzard of East Frisia; Elizabeth of East Frisia; Sophia of East Frisia; Karl Otto of East Frisia; Maria of East Frisia
Names
- Swedish: Katarina Gustavsdotter Vasa
- House: Vasa
- Father: Gustav I of Sweden
- Mother: Margaret Leijonhufvud

Catherine Vasa of Sweden (Swedish: Katarina Gustavsdotter Vasa; 6 June 1539 – 21 December 1610) was a Swedish princess, and the Countess consort of East Frisia as the spouse of Edzard II, Count of East Frisia. She was the oldest daughter of Gustav Vasa and Margareta Leijonhufvud. She was the autonomous Regent of Berum and Norden in Ostfriesland (East Frisia) from 1599 to 1610.

== Biography ==
=== Early life ===
During her early childhood, she, as well as her siblings in the royal nursery, were primarily under the care of her mother the queen's trusted nurse, Brigitta Lars Anderssons, her mother's cousin lady Margareta and the noble widow Ingrid Amundsdotter. After the death of her mother in 1551, she as well as her siblings were placed in the care of Christina Gyllenstierna and then under her aunts Brita and Martha Leijonhufvud before her father's remarriage to Catherine Stenbock. In 1556, she and her sisters were given a dowry of 100.000 daler, had their portraits painted and their personal qualities described in Latin by the court poet Henricus Mollerus and were presented on the Dynastic marriage market. The same year, her father presented Ostfriesland with a trading treaty and a marriage alliance. Ostfriesland was chosen because it was strategically placed toward Denmark, and because the Calvinistic Emden was a rival to Lubeck and a treaty could break the domination of the Hanseatic league in Sweden. In 1557, the trading treaty was completed, and in 1558, Edzard visited Sweden to meet Catherine and her sister Cecilia and chose one of them to complete the marriage treaty.

Edzard chose Catherine, but the negotiations took a long time, so much so that Gustav Vasa stated in his frustration that it was a blessing that his daughter was at least neither "limped or blind". Edzard's mother, the dowager Regent Anna of Oldenburg, was afraid that the marriage would lead to Swedish domination, and therefore split the power in Ostfriesland between her sons, something which the king tried to prevent. In the marriage contract of 12 August 1558, Catherine was assured Berum and Norden as her dower lands and the post of Regent if Edzard should be succeeded by an underage son of hers.

The wedding took place in Stockholm 1 October 1559. In November, Catherine and Edzard left for Ostfriesland. Upon their journey through Sweden, they were accompanied by her sister Cecilia and the brother of Edzard, John II of Osfriesland. While staying in Vadstena on the way, a great scandal erupted when John was discovered in Cecilia's chamber without his trousers. The scandal became famous under the name Vadstenabullret (Vadstena Rumble). John were imprisoned and Catherine and Edzard placed under guard in Västerås Castle. Catherine acted as mediator to execute a release of John, that Cecilia be treated leniently and to be given permission to leave. The complications, her own pregnancy and the death of her father in 1560 caused the delay of their departure until 1561.

=== Countess of Ostfriesland ===
Catherine arrived in Ostfriesland in April 1561. As countess of Ostfriesland, Catherine took an active part in policy and the affairs of state. She supported Edzard in his conflict with his brother John over the rule of the divided Ostfriesland, while John had the support of his mother Anna. The conflict also had a religious dimension, as Edzard and Catherine were Lutherans, while John and Anna were Calvinists. She worked to secure a new succession which banned co-ruling, and she actively supported Lutheranism before Calvinism.

In 1578, the childless John did agree that the son of Catherine should be his heir, but this did not end the struggle. Catherine fully used her family connections for her policy and asked her ruling brothers to intervene in her benefit, while she herself used her connections in return: she assisted Charles with his export- and import business, she provided ships for the Swedish fleet in the war against Russia, and assisted in the negotiations for marriages for Charles and Elizabeth. She is known to have protested against the marriage of her brother King John III to Gunilla Bielke in 1585. In 1591, Edzard became the sole ruler, but in 1595, the Emden revolution erupted. Catherine asked for the assistance of her brother Charles IX, who on this occasion advised her to show religious tolerance and expressed his surprise that it was always Catherine who seemed to handle the negotiations of the affairs of state rather than Edzard.

=== Fiefholder ===
After the death of Edzard in 1599, Catherine lived at Berum Castle and took control over her dower lands Norden, Pewsum, Woquard, Loquard, Campen and Neeuwarden. These lands were only given to her as her dower lands, but Catherine instead took control over them as an autonomous ruler: the refused to acknowledge her son Enno III and his right to collect taxes and exert authority in her fiefs, and declared herself a vassal directly under the emperor. This caused a conflict with her son which remained unsolved until her death. When the council of Enno III reprimanded him for being to submissive to her and pointed out to him that Catherine abused her rights as a mother to demand obedience, he excused himself by saying: "Because she is a woman, because she is a widow, already seventy, because she is the daughter of a king and, which is the greatest reason to show her respect, because she is a mother."

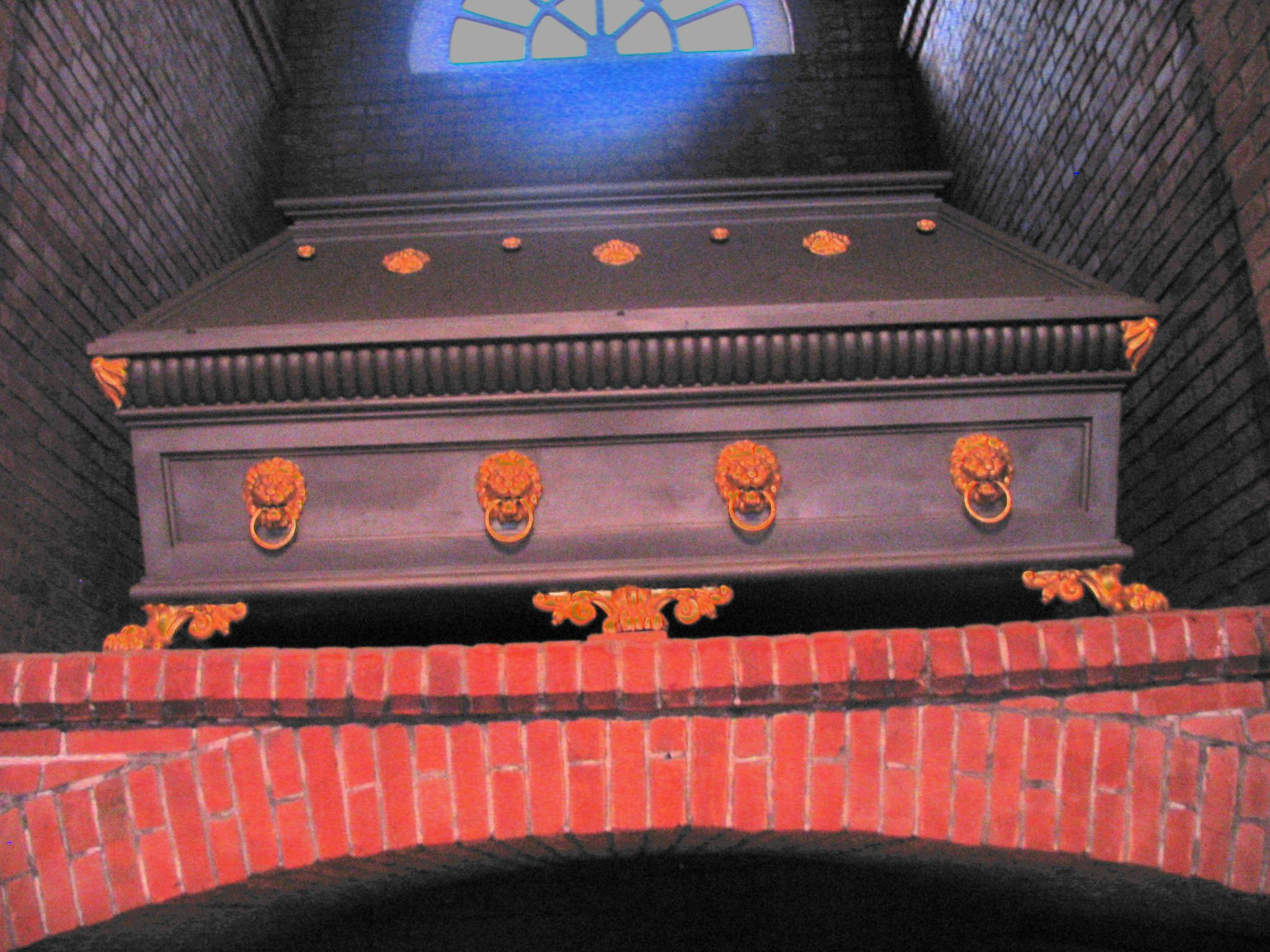
Catherine's grave in Aurich

Catherine is considered to be closest in character to her father among her siblings. She is described as intelligent and learned with an interest in literature and theology. She was a convinced Lutheran, visited Wittenberg to study theology, wrote interpretations of the bible, wrote an ode to Edzard at his funeral and was herself dedicated a work by a Lutheran theologian.

== Family ==
Catherine was married to Edzard II of Ostfriesland on 1 October 1559, in Stockholm. They had the following children:

1. Margaret of Ostfriesland (1560–1588)
2. Anne of Ostfriesland, (1562–1621); married firstly Louis VI, Elector Palatine; married secondly Ernest Frederick, Margrave of Baden-Durlach; married thirdly Julius Henry of Saxe-Lauenburg. She had no surviving issue from any of her marriages.
3. Enno III of Ostfriesland (1563–1625)
4. John III of Rietberg (1566–1625)
5. Christopher of Ostfriesland (1569–1636)
6. Edzard of Ostfriesland (1571–1572)
7. Elizabeth of Ostfriesland (1572–1573)
8. Sophia of Ostfriesland (1574–1630)
9. Karl Otto of Ostfriesland (1577–1603)
10. Maria of Ostfriesland (1582–1616); married Julius Ernst, Duke of Brunswick-Dannenberg and had issue.

== Ancestors ==
Ancestors of Catherine Vasa of Sweden

Johan Kristiersson (Vasa)
Erik Johansson (Vasa)
Birgitta Gustafsdotter (Sture)
Gustav I of Sweden (Vasa)
Måns Karlsson (Eka)
Cecilia Månsdotter (Eka)
Sigrid Eskilsdotter (Banér)
Catherine of Sweden (Vasa)
Abraham Kristiernsson (Leijonhufvud)
Erik Abrahamsson (Leijonhufvud)
Birgitta Månsdotter (Natt och Dag)
Margareta Leijonhufvud
Erik Karlsson (Vasa)
Ebba Eriksdotter (Vasa)
Anna Karlsdotter (Vinstorpa)

== Sources cited ==
- Karin Tegenborg Falkdalen (2010). Vasadöttrarna (The Vasa Daughters). Falun: Historiska Media. ISBN 978-91-85873-87-6 (In Swedish)

Vacant Title last held by Anna of Oldenburg	Countess of East Frisia; 1559–1599	Vacant Title next held by Anna of Holstein-Gottorp
