= Sabina Catharina of East Frisia =

Countess of Rietberg

- Countess of Rietberg; Lady of Esens, Stedesdorf and Wittmund
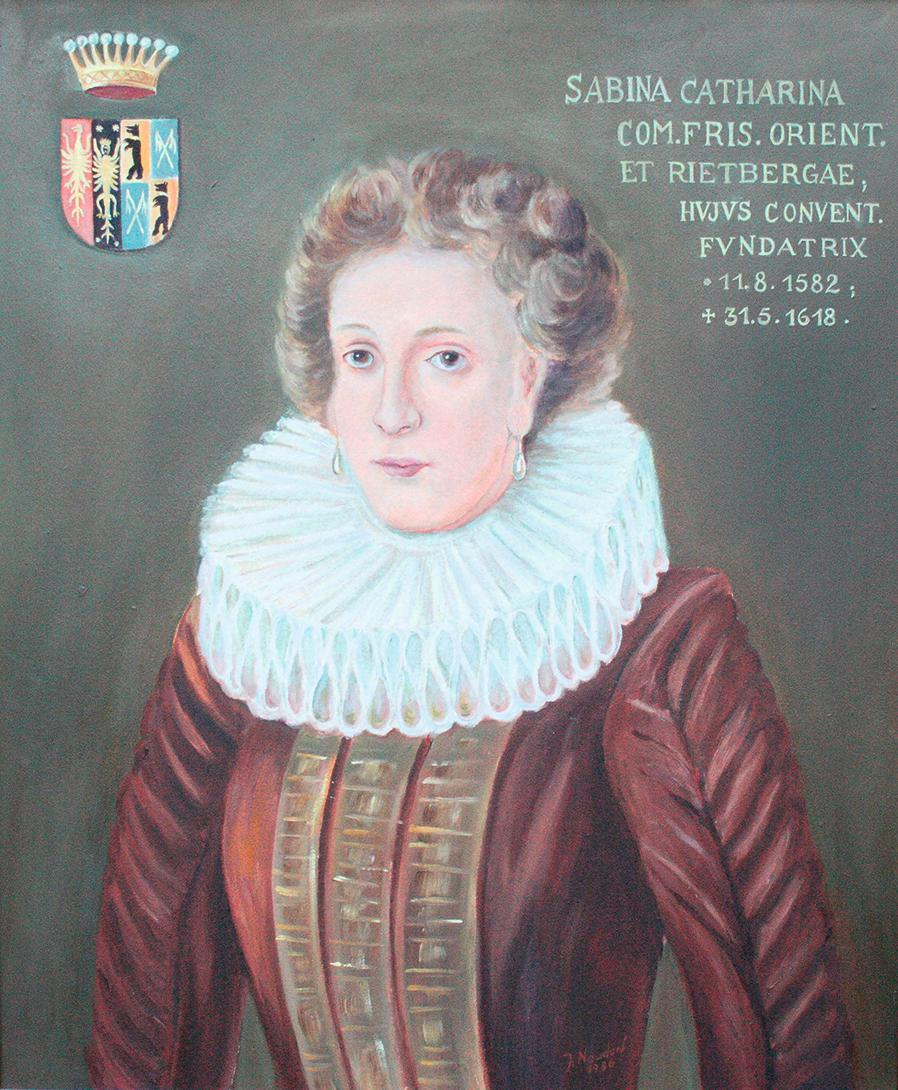
- Sabina Catharina of East Frisia

Countess of Rietberg
- Reign: 26 May 1586 - 31 May 1618
- Predecessor: Walburgis of Rietberg
- Successor: Johan III (as sole ruler)
- Alongside: Johan III (1601–1618)

Lady of Esens, Stedesdorf and Wittmund
- Reign: 26 May 1586 - 28 January 1600
- Predecessor: Walburgis of Rietberg
- Successor: Enno III
- Born: 11 August 1582; Esens
- Died: 31 May 1618 (aged 35)
- Spouse: Johan III of Rietberg
- House: Cirksena
- Father: Enno III, Count of East Frisia
- Mother: Walburgis, Countess of Rietberg

Sabina Catharina of East Frisia (11 August 1582 – 31 May 1618) was a Countess of Rietberg in what is now Germany.

== Life ==
Sabina Catharina was the eldest child of Count Enno III of East Frisia and his first wife, Countess Walburgis of Rietberg. In the Treaty of Berum of 28 January, the lands her father had inherited from her mother were divided between Sabina Catherine and her sister Agnes, because their father wanted to marry again. Sabina Catherine was awarded the County of Rietberg.

On 3 March 1601, Sabina married her uncle, Johan III, in a ceremony officiated by Abbot Leonard Ruben of Abdinghof Abbey. The necessary papal dispensation was issued on 13 April 1600. Before the wedding the couple converted to the Catholic faith. In 1618, the couple laid the foundation for the Franciscan monastery in Rietberg. The founding document of the monastery was issued in 1629.

Sabina Catharina died on 31 May 1618 during the birth of her eleventh child. The coffin was buried in the chapel.

== Marriage and issue ==
Sabina Catharina and John III had eleven children:

- Edzard (born 2 February 1602 – died 28 March 1603)
- Anna Walburgis (born: 27 October 1603 – died: 29 November 1604)
- Maria Catherine (born: 28 October 1604), married to the Marquis de Warenbon
- Ernest Christopher, (born: 1 April 1606 – died: 31 December 1640), Count of Rietberg 1625–1640, Vice Marshal, married Margravine Albertine Maria of St. Martin
- Philip Enno (born: 23 March 1608 – died: 14 May 1636), a canon of Cologne, Strasbourg and Paderborn
- Leopold (born: 23 November 1609 – died: 14 November 1635), a canon of Cologne, Strasbourg and Paderborn
- Walburgis Maria (born: 8 May 1612 – died: 13 June 1613)
- Francis Ferdinand (born: 4 October 1613 – died: 27 June 1648), a canon of Cologne, Magdeburg, Strasbourg and Halberstadt
- Clara Sophia (born: 7 March 7, 1615)
- Anna Clara (born: 30 May 1616, †?)
- John IV (born: 31 May 1618 – died: 7 August 1660), 1640–1660, Count of Rietberg 1640–1660, married to Countess Anna Catherine of Salm-Reifferscheidt. They had issue.

Sabina Catharina of East Frisia Cirksena Born: 11 August 1582 Died: 31 May 1618
Preceded by Walburgis	Countess of Rietberg; 1586–1618	Succeeded by John III
