= Jacob Alting =

Dutch philologist and theologian

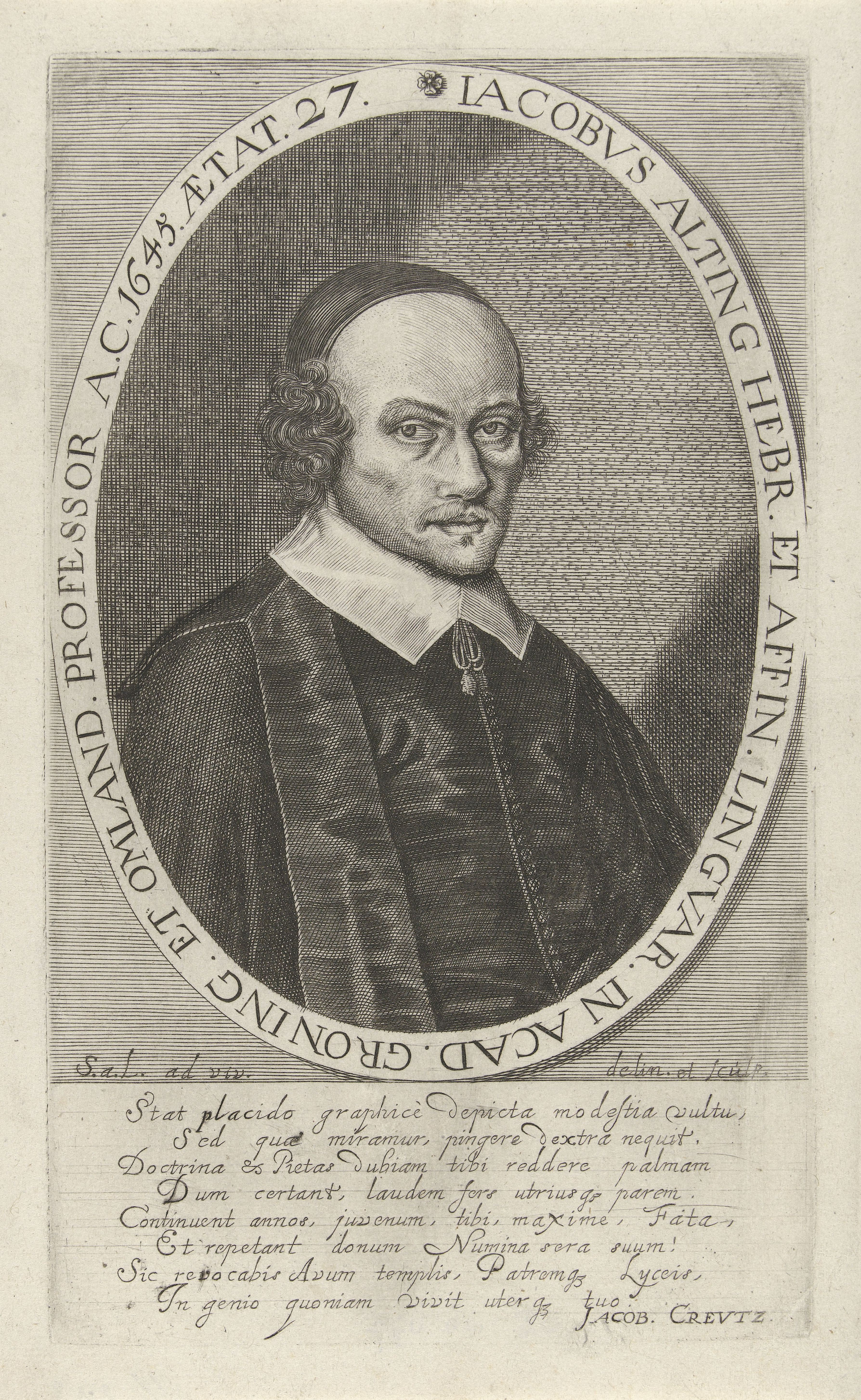
Jacob Alting

Jacob Alting (27 September 1618 – 20 August 1679) was a German preacher, teacher and writer. His area of specialism was Oriental languages.

== Life ==
Alting was born in Heidelberg, where his father Hendrik Alting was a theology professor; his grandfather Menso Alting was also a preacher.

The 1618/1619 Synod of Dort forced the family to move to Leiden in 1622 and to Groningen in 1627. He studied at Gröningen university and then in England, where he was ordained as a preacher; he was named professor of theology at Groningen University in 1667 after holding the chair of oriental languages since 1643.

Alting and his colleague Maresius disagreed on several areas, including biblical exegesis and receiving gifts from students. Maresius accused him of heterodoxy and they were brought before the university officials, who ruled that there was no case to answer and both men were valued at the university. The two men reconciled just before Maresius’ death.

Alting was involved in various refutations of Spinoza's Tractatus Theologico-Politicus (TTP) and eagerly began drafting up arguments from the writings of Ezra and Nehemiah for a refutation of the 'Theological-Political Treatise' being published by the Cartesian Deventer theologian Antonius Perizonius. His works were published posthumously by Balthasar Bekker.

== Family ==
In 1648 Alting married Baudewina Walrich and they had eight children.
