= Palafox =

Palafox is a somewhat uncommon surname that originated in Spain and may refer to:

- Palafoxia, a genus of flowering plants from the sunflower family
- Antonio Palafox (born 1936), Mexican tennis player
- José de Palafox y Melzi, Duke of Saragossa (1775-1847), Spanish general
- Juan de Palafox y Mendoza (1600–1659), Spanish bishop, politician and writer in colonial Mexico
- Luis Rebolledo de Palafox y Melci, 1st marqués de Lazán (1772-1843), Spanish general
- Manuel Palafox (1886–1959), Mexican politician
- María Tomasa Palafox, Marquise of Villafranca (1780–1835), Spanish art patron and muse
