= Emden =

City in Germany

- Town
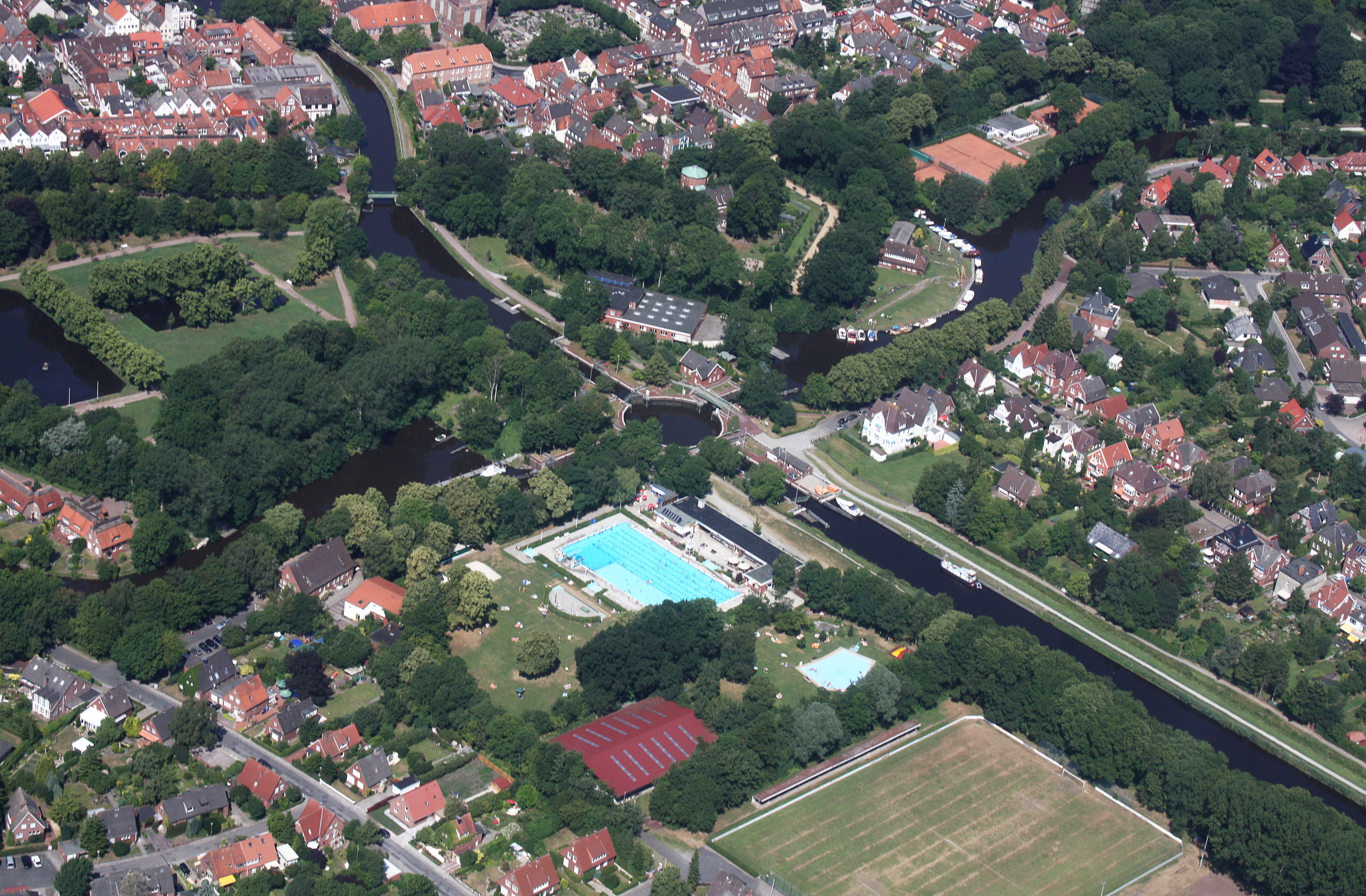

- Flag Coat of arms
- Interactive map of Emden
- Location within Germany Location within Lower Saxony
- Coordinates: 53°22′1″N 07°12′22″E
- Country: Germany
- State: Lower Saxony
- District: Urban district

Government
  - Mayor (2019–26): Tim Kruithoff (Ind.)

Area
  - Total: 112.33 km^{2} (43.37 sq mi)
- Elevation: 1 m (3.3 ft)

Population (2025-12-31)
  - Total: 49,009
  - Density: 436.29/km^{2} (1,130.0/sq mi)
- Time zone: UTC+01:00 (CET)
  - Summer (DST): UTC+02:00 (CEST)
- Postal codes: 26721, 26723, 26725
- Dialling codes: 04921, 04927 (Knock)
- Vehicle registration: EMD
- Website: www.emden.de

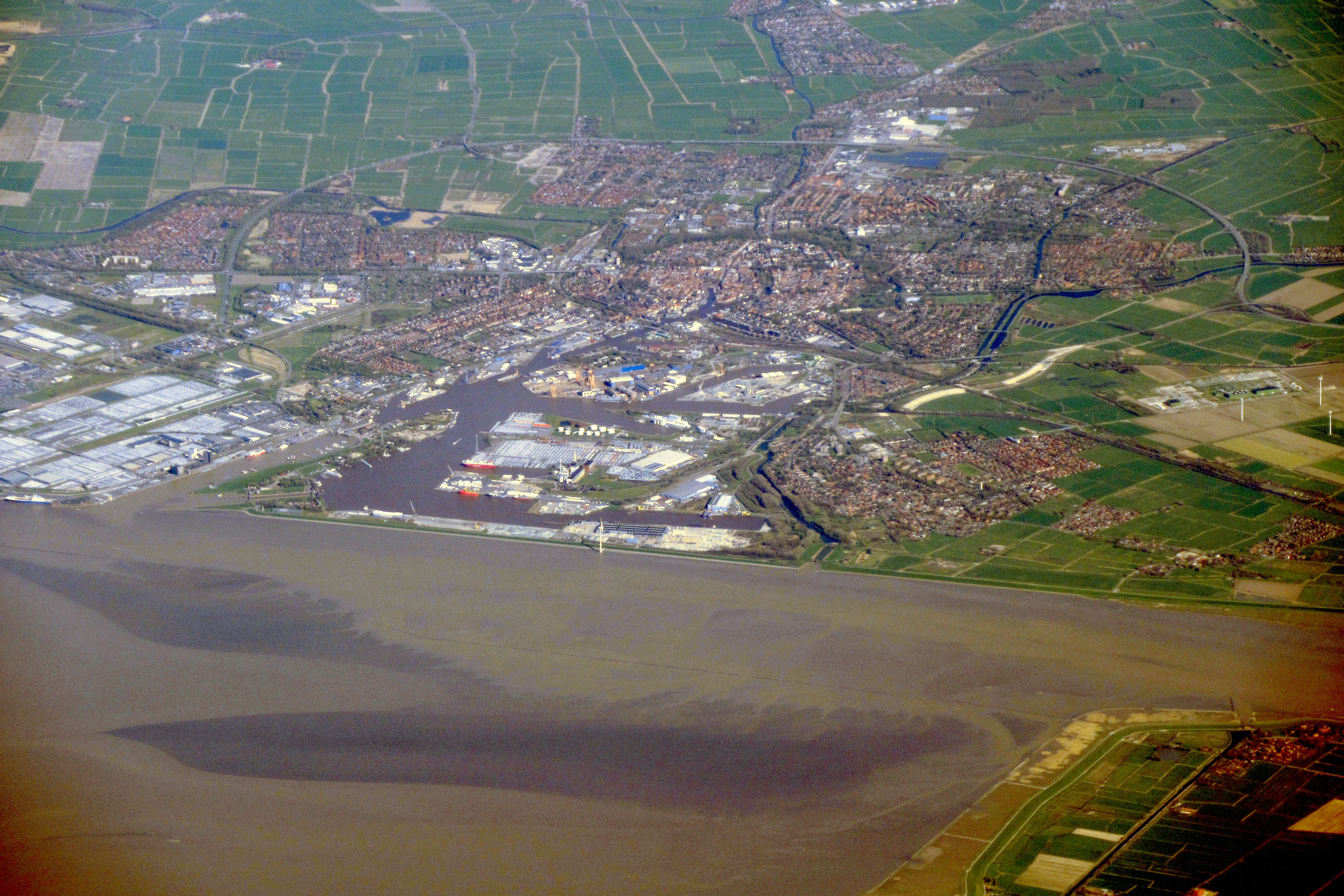
Aerial view

Emden (German pronunciation: [ˈɛmdn̩]) is an independent town and seaport in Lower Saxony in the north-west of Germany and lies on the River Ems, close to the Netherlands border. It is the main town in the region of East Frisia and had a total population of 50,535 in 2022.

== History ==
Historical affiliations

County of East Frisia 1464–1744
Kingdom of Prussia 1744–1806
(Netherlands) Kingdom of Holland 1806–1810
First French Empire 1810–1813
Kingdom of Prussia 1813–1815
Kingdom of Hanover 1815–1866
Kingdom of Prussia 1866–1871
German Empire 1871–1918
Weimar Republic 1918–1933
Nazi Germany 1933–1945
Allied-occupied Germany 1945–1949
West Germany 1949–1990
Germany 1990–present

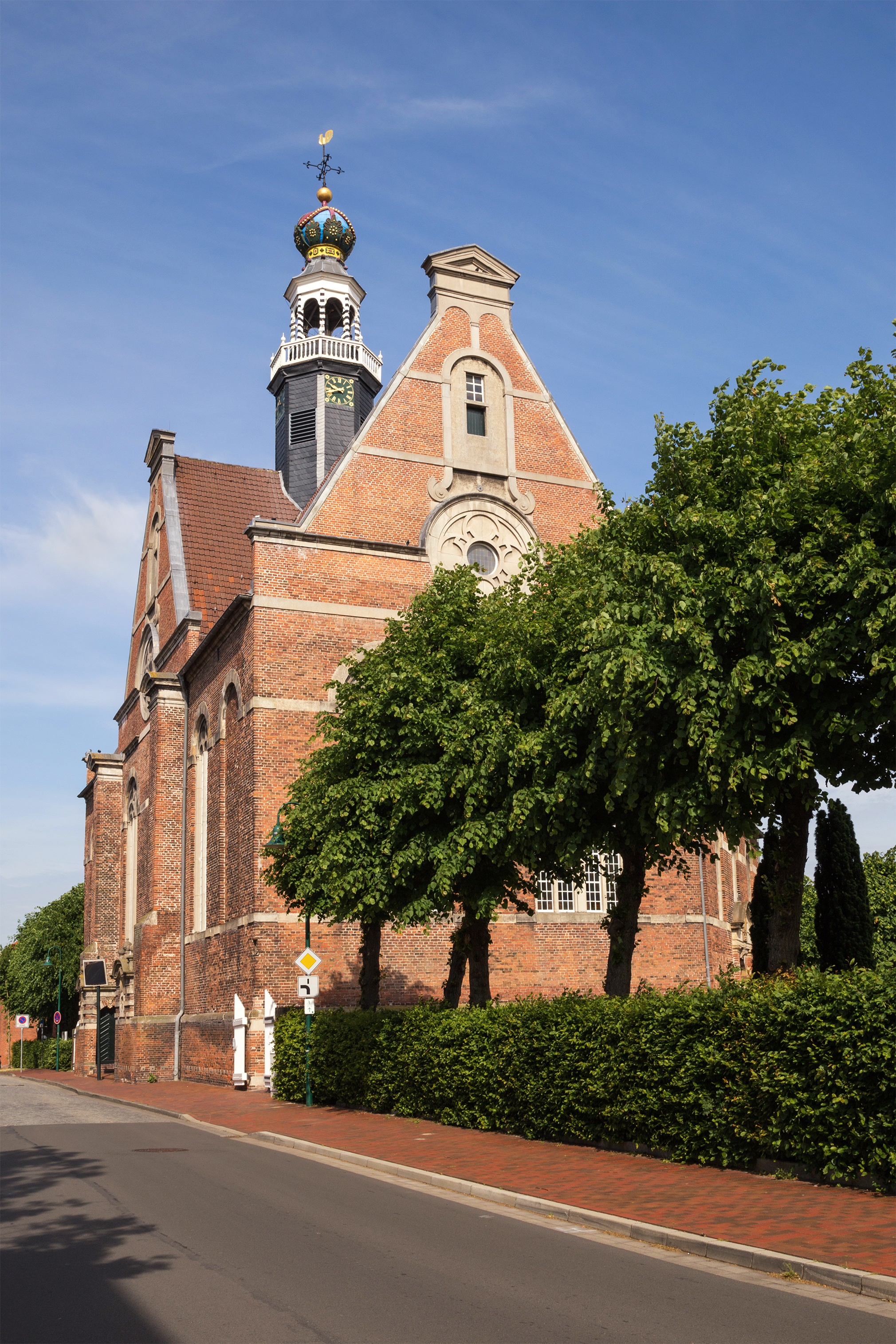
A church in Emden built in 1648

The exact date when Emden was founded is unknown, but it has existed since at least the 8th century. Older names for Emden were Setutanda, Amuthon, Embda, Emda, Embden and Embderland. Its town privilege and coat of arms, the Engelke up de Muer (The Little Angel on the Wall), were granted by Emperor Maximilian I in 1495.

In the 16th century, Emden briefly became an important centre for the Protestant Reformation under the rule of Countess Anna von Oldenburg, who was determined to find a religious "third way" between Lutheranism and Catholicism. In 1542 she invited the Polish noble John Laski (or Johannes a Lasco) to become pastor of a Protestant church at Emden, and for seven years he continued to spread the new religion around the area of East Frisia. However, in 1549, following pressure from Emperor Charles V, the Countess was forced to ask Laski to leave for England and the experiment came to an end. Nevertheless, the legacy was important for the reformation in the Netherlands.

At the end of the 16th century, Emden experienced a period of great prosperity. Due to the Spanish blockade of Flemish and Brabant ports at the start of the Dutch Revolt, Emden became the most important transshipment port on the North Sea. Thousands of Protestant refugees came from Flanders and the Duchy of Brabant to the Protestant town of Emden to escape persecution by the Spanish rulers of the Low Countries. During this period, Emden was predominantly Calvinist and came into conflict with the Lutheran counts of East Friesland. The Synod of Emden in 1571 is generally considered to be the founding of the Dutch Reformed Church, the oldest of the Reformed churches in the Netherlands.

The Emden Revolution in 1595 resulted in Emden becoming a distinct city-state. With the support of the Dutch Republic, Emden became a free government city under the protection of the Dutch Republic. The Brabantian dialect became the official language of trade and civil administration. Emden was a very rich city during the 17th century, due to large numbers of Dutch and Flemish immigrants such as Diederik Jansz Graeff. It was a centre of reformed Protestantism at that time. The political theorist Johannes Althusius served as Syndic from 1604 to 1638.

In 1744, Emden was annexed by Prussia. The Emden Convention, signed on 14 March 1744, was a treaty that formalised Prussia's annexation of East Frisia after the local Cirksena dynasty died out. It recognised the rights and privileges of the city of Emden and the regional estates. Carl Edzard, the last Count of East Frisia, assumed power in 1734, but faced opposition from Emden and other estates, leading to political and economic isolation. Emden sought to regain its status as a trading hub and looked to Prussia for help. In exchange for recognising Prussia’s claim to East Frisia, Emden demanded the withdrawal of foreign troops, the return of sequestered assets and the relocation of the estate treasury to Emden. Prussia, under Frederick II, aimed to secure its claim to East Frisia, relying on a 1694 decree from Emperor Leopold I. Negotiations led by Sebastian Anton Homfeld resulted in two treaties being signed on 14 March 1744. These agreements upheld Emden’s status and granted the city special economic and administrative privileges. After Carl Edzard’s death on 25 May 1744, Prussia quickly occupied East Frisia without resistance and the region soon swore allegiance to the Prussian crown. Foreign troops withdrew from the area.

In 1752 Frederick the Great chartered the Emden Company to trade with Canton, but the company was ruined when Emden was captured by French forces in 1757 during the Seven Years' War. The city was recaptured by Anglo-German forces in 1758 and was used as a major supply base by the British for the rest of the conflict to support the ongoing war in Westphalia. During the Napoleonic Wars, Emden and the surrounding lands of East Frisia were part of the short-lived Kingdom of Holland.

Industrialisation started at around 1870, with a paper mill and a somewhat bigger shipyard. At the end of the 19th century, a big canal, the Dortmund-Ems Canal was constructed, which connected Emden to the Ruhr area. This made Emden the "seaport of the Ruhr area", which lasted until the 1970s. Coal from the south was transported to the North Sea port, and imported iron ore was shipped towards the Rhine and the Ruhr via the canal. The last iron-ore freighter was moored in the port of Emden in 1986. In 1903, a large shipyard (Nordseewerke, "North Sea Works") was founded, which was in operation until 2010.

During World War II, Emden was repeatedly targeted by Allied bombing raids, which destroyed most of the town centre. The Royal Air Force (RAF) launched its first bombing raid over Emden on 31 March 1940, and both the RAF and the United States Army Air Forces (USAAF) continued to launch raids on the town for the duration of the war. On 6 September 1944, the RAF and USAAF launched their largest bombing raid on Emden, which destroyed approximately 80% of all the buildings in the town centre. However, in contrast to the rest of the town, the Emden shipyards were left largely unaffected by the bombing raids. After the war, Emden came under Allied occupation and rebuilding efforts commenced. The current town hall was officially opened in Emden on 6 September 1962, exactly 18 years after the 1944 raid.

== Climate ==
Climate data for Emden (1991–2020 normals)
| Month | Jan | Feb | Mar | Apr | May | Jun | Jul | Aug | Sep | Oct | Nov | Dec | Year |
|---|---|---|---|---|---|---|---|---|---|---|---|---|---|
| Mean daily maximum °C (°F) | 5.1 (41.2) | 5.9 (42.6) | 9.0 (48.2) | 13.8 (56.8) | 17.4 (63.3) | 20.1 (68.2) | 22.1 (71.8) | 22.3 (72.1) | 18.9 (66.0) | 14.1 (57.4) | 9.0 (48.2) | 6.0 (42.8) | 13.7 (56.7) |
| Daily mean °C (°F) | 2.9 (37.2) | 3.1 (37.6) | 5.3 (41.5) | 8.9 (48.0) | 12.5 (54.5) | 15.5 (59.9) | 17.5 (63.5) | 17.6 (63.7) | 14.6 (58.3) | 10.5 (50.9) | 6.5 (43.7) | 3.9 (39.0) | 9.9 (49.8) |
| Mean daily minimum °C (°F) | 0.5 (32.9) | 0.4 (32.7) | 1.6 (34.9) | 4.1 (39.4) | 7.6 (45.7) | 10.8 (51.4) | 13.0 (55.4) | 13.1 (55.6) | 10.5 (50.9) | 7.1 (44.8) | 3.8 (38.8) | 1.5 (34.7) | 6.2 (43.2) |
| Average precipitation mm (inches) | 69.9 (2.75) | 51.8 (2.04) | 50.6 (1.99) | 42.2 (1.66) | 53.6 (2.11) | 71.9 (2.83) | 86.0 (3.39) | 83.0 (3.27) | 77.7 (3.06) | 75.0 (2.95) | 66.7 (2.63) | 75.3 (2.96) | 808.8 (31.84) |
| Average precipitation days (≥ 0.1 mm) | 20.6 | 16.0 | 15.6 | 13.9 | 14.0 | 15.3 | 17.7 | 16.7 | 16.4 | 18.6 | 19.3 | 21.0 | 205.4 |
| Average relative humidity (%) | 89.4 | 86.5 | 82.4 | 77.8 | 76.6 | 77.7 | 78.5 | 79.6 | 82.9 | 85.9 | 89.7 | 90.3 | 83.2 |
| Mean monthly sunshine hours | 42.9 | 70.7 | 122.3 | 185.4 | 214.1 | 202.8 | 202.4 | 186.4 | 145.9 | 103.3 | 52.7 | 42.2 | 1,582 |
Source: NOAA

== Economy ==
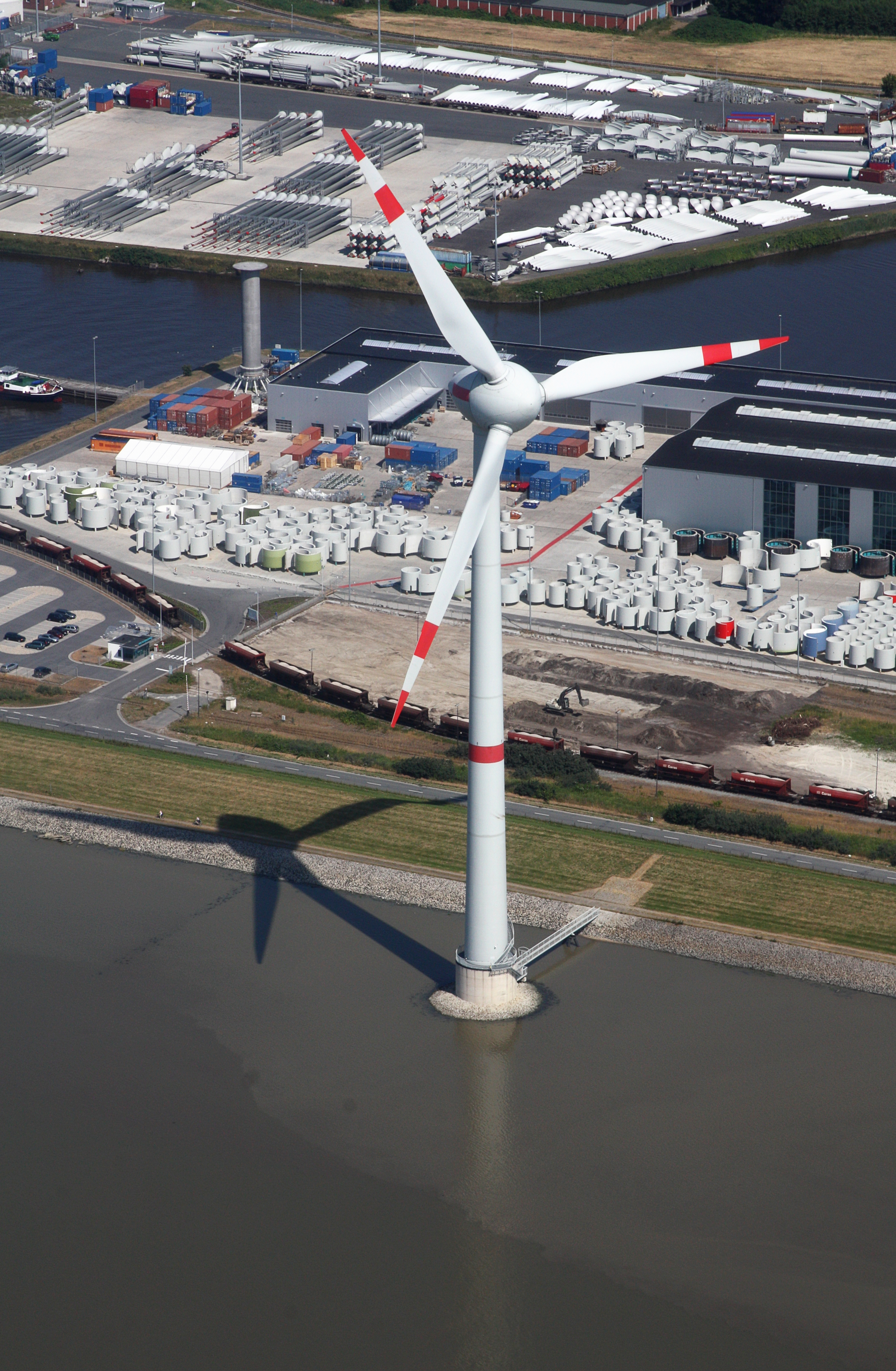
Wind turbine in Emden

The main industries in Emden are automobile production and shipbuilding. Volkswagen runs a large production plant which builds the Volkswagen Arteon car and which employs around 10,000 people. Emden harbour is also one of the three main ports for car shipping in Europe (together with Zeebrugge in Belgium and Bremerhaven in Germany). Emden is the main location from which vehicles produced at all Volkswagen Group factories in Germany are marshalled for export overseas.

More than 1.4 million cars were imported and exported in 2017. The Nordseewerke shipyard, a subsidiary of ThyssenKrupp, employs around 1,400 dockers and specialises in conventional submarines. It also produces different kinds of cargo ships as well as ships for special purposes, such as icebreakers, dredgers and other ships of that type.

Another important economic sector is tourism, mainly as Emden is a popular day-trip destination for tourists staying in surrounding villages on the North Sea coastline.

A university of applied sciences (Fachhochschule) was opened in 1973. At present, around 4,240 students are enrolled, most of whom are studying for degrees in technical subjects like engineering.

The airline Ostfriesische Lufttransport had its headquarters in Emden.

== Sports ==
The highest-playing association football club is BSV Kickers Emden. The capacity of the stadium is 7,200, due to safety objections by the German Football Association. In 1994, some 12,000 spectators attended a match against the reserves squad of Hamburger SV, which remains the record. In that season, Kickers Emden finished top of the 3rd League, but it was not promoted to the Second League as it lost the promotion round.

Since Emden is not only located close to the North Sea, but also on the River Ems and various small rivers and canals run through it as well, boat sports are very popular among the locals and tourists.

== Notable people ==
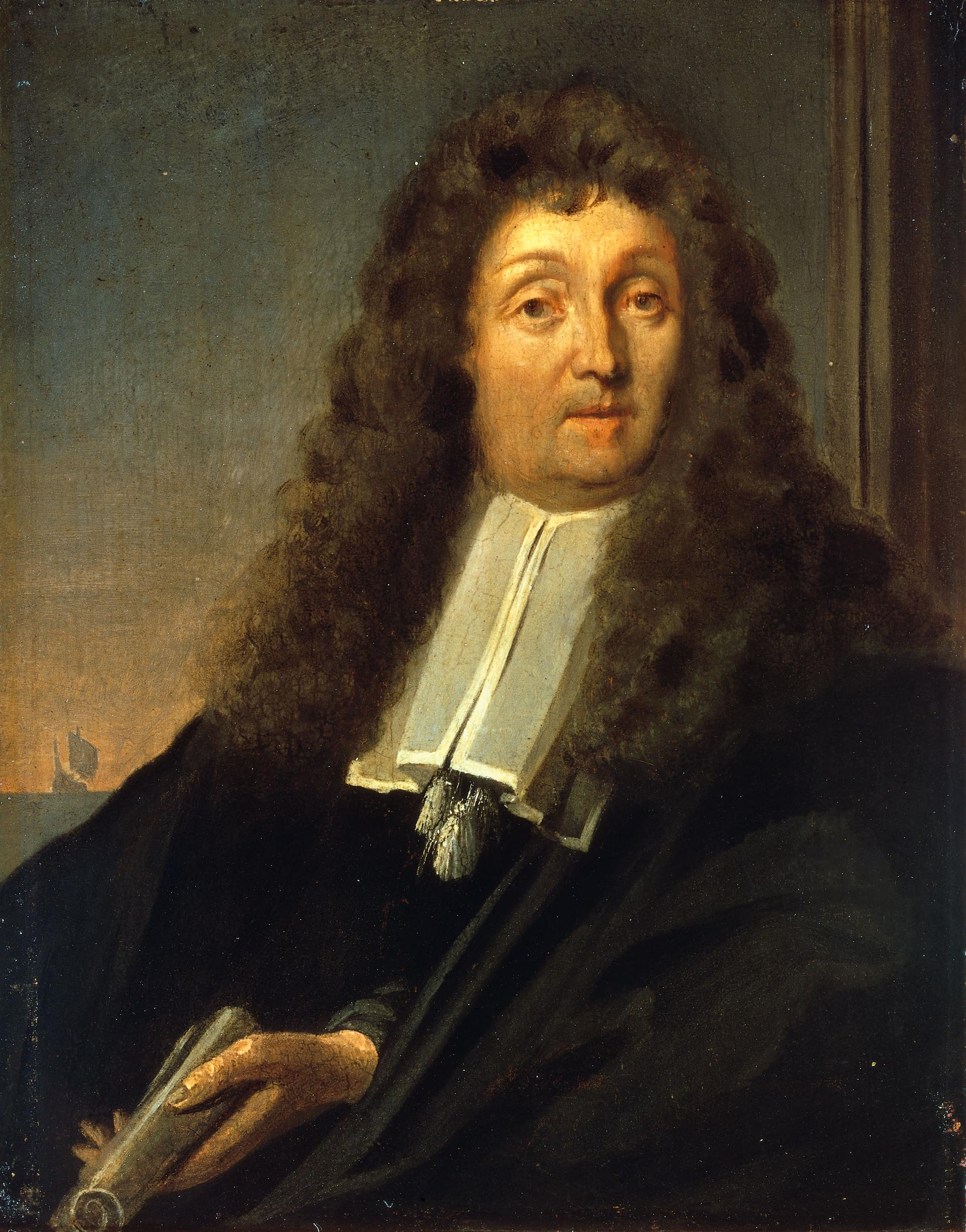
Ludolf Bakhuizen self-portrait

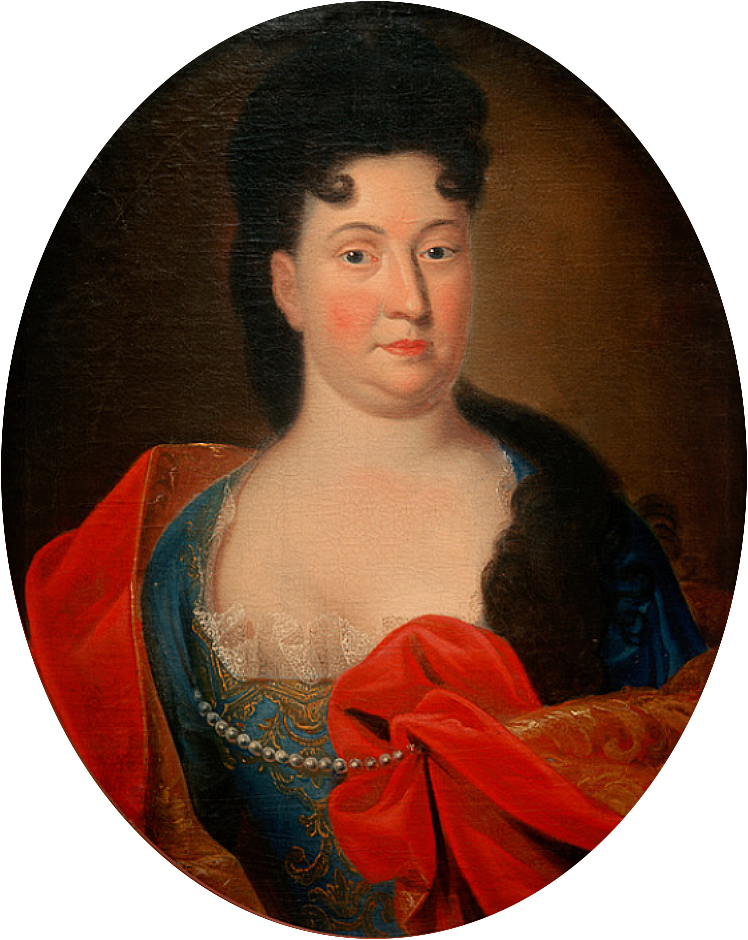
Melusine von der Schulenburg, ca 1705

- Johann van Lingen, (DE Wiki) (1425–1481), Mayor of Emden, 1463–1470
- Pieter Dirkszoon Keyser (ca 1540–1596), navigator and celestial cartographer in Portuguese and Dutch service
- Johannes Althusius (1563–1638), legal scholar, Calvinist political theorist, elected a local municipal trustee in 1603
- Jacob Dircksz de Graeff (1571–1638), member of the De Graeff family; Amsterdam burgomaster in the Dutch Golden Age.
- Johann Heinrich Alting (1583–1644), reformed theologian.
- Martin Hermann Faber (1586–1648), painter, architect, and cartographer
- Simon Bosboom (1614–1662), a Dutch Golden Age architect and writer.
- Abraham and Bernard van Linge (fl.1625–1641) & (1598–ca1644); stained glass window painters, worked in Oxford
- Ludolf Bakhuizen (1630–1708), major Dutch painter.
- Melusine von der Schulenburg, Duchess of Kendal (1667–1743), mistress to King George I of Great Britain.
- Jacob Emden (1697–1776), also known as Ya'avetz; talmudist; and rabbi of Emden from 1728
- Eduard Norden (1868–1941), philologist and religious historian
- Claude France (1893–1928), actor
- Hans Boelsen (1894–1960), general lieutenant in the Second World War
- Henri Nannen (1913–1996), publisher and publicist, founder of Stern magazine
- Hans-Joachim Hespos (1938–2022), composer of avant-garde music.
- Helma Sanders-Brahms (1940–2014), film director, screenwriter and producer.
- Karl Dall (1941–2020), presenter, singer and comedian
- Wolfgang Petersen (1941–2022), film director and producer
- Alwin Brinkmann, (DE Wiki) (born 1946), Mayor of Emden from 1986 to 2011
- Otto Waalkes (born 1948), comedian, comic artist, singer and actor
- Eva Herman (born 1958), book author and former television presenter
- Jan van Koningsveld (born 1969), mental calculator
- Heidi Hartmann, (DE Wiki) (born 1971), boxing champion
- Stefan Lampadius (born 1976), actor and filmmaker
- Ferydoon Zandi (born 1979), Iranian footballer, played 318 games and 29 for Iran

== Ships and places named after the city ==
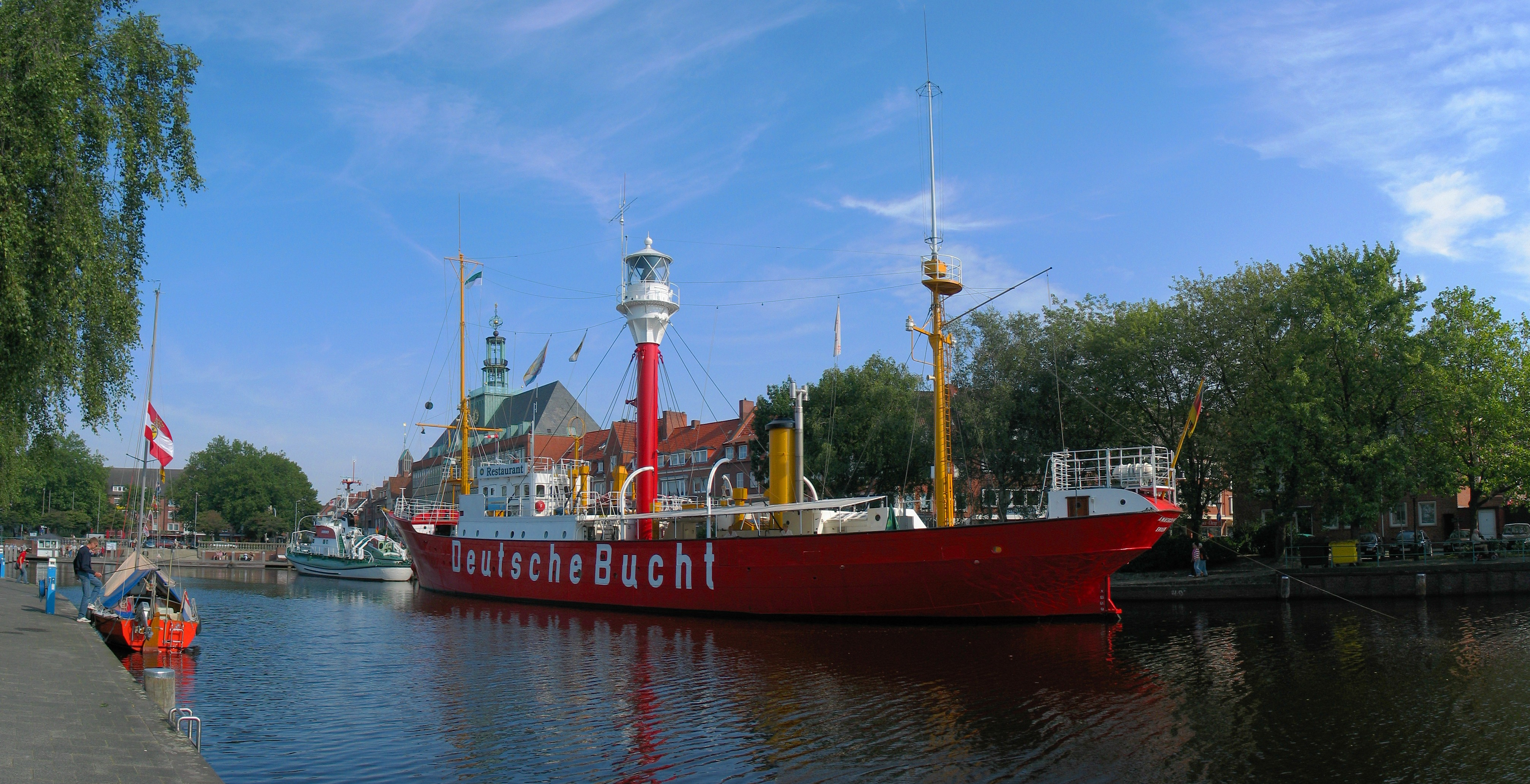
Retired light vessel Amrumbank in front of Emden town hall.

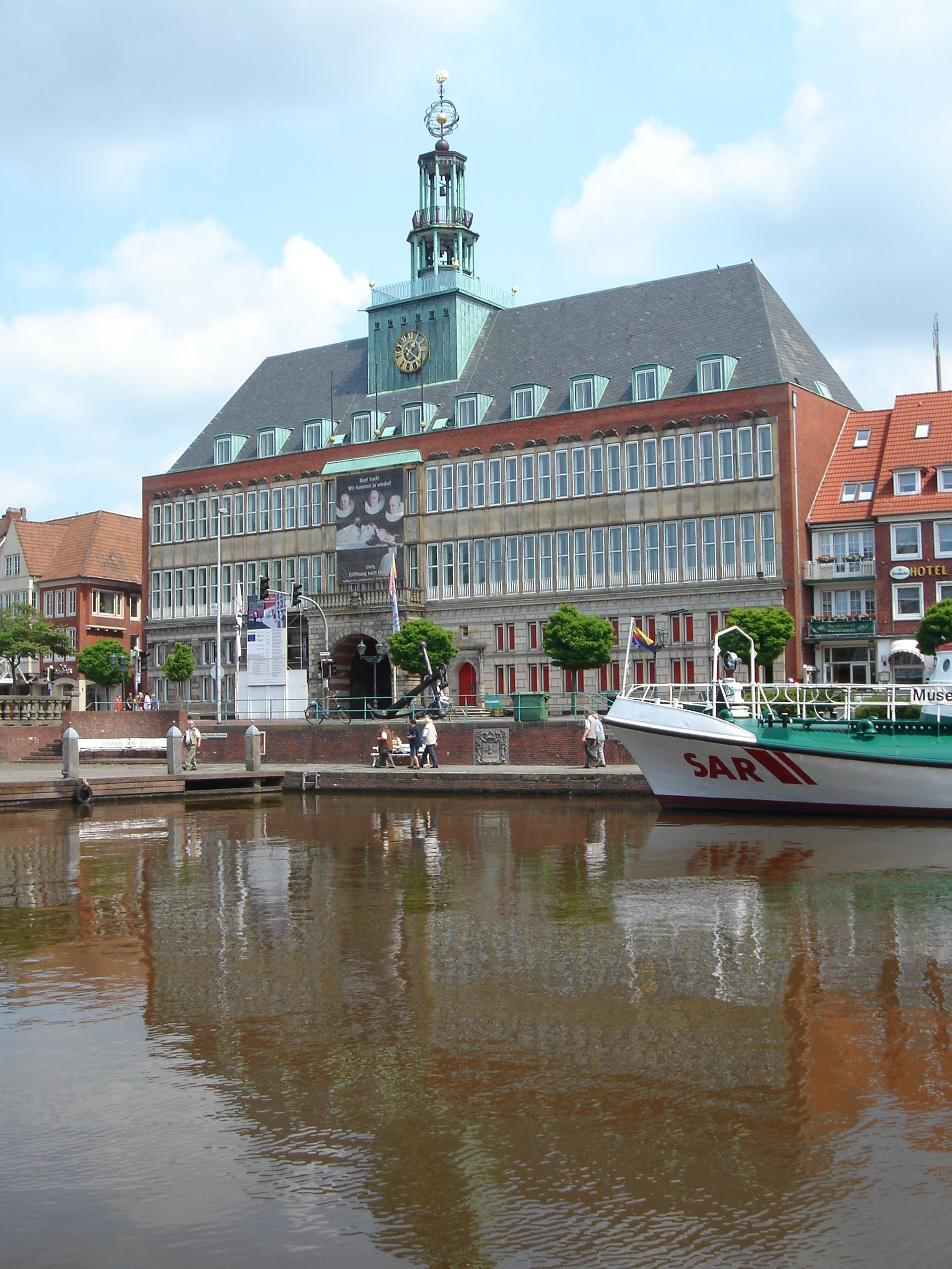
The Town Hall (Rathaus)

Three German light cruisers were named after the city, two of which served in World War I and the third in World War II. Today, the fifth navy ship named after the town is in service.

- SMS Emden (1906), a light cruiser in the Kaiserliche Marine, took part in the battles of the Bay of Bengal, and Battle of Cocos
- Emden (1911), a schooner, renamed Duhnen, then Brigantine Yankee; made four circumnavigations
- SMS Emden (1916), a light cruiser in the Kaiserliche Marine
- Emden (1925), a light cruiser in the Kriegsmarine, used in the invasion of Norway and Denmark
- Emden (F221) (1961), a Köln-class frigate of the German Navy
- Emden (F210) (1979), a Bremen-class frigate of the German Navy
- Emden (F266) (2025), a Braunschweig-class corvette of the German Navy

A deep-sea spot in the Pacific Ocean close to the Philippines is named after the first Emden ship and is therefore called Emdentief in German. The spot (10,400 m or 34,100 ft deep) was sounded in the 1920s (in 1920, 1923 or 1928 — sources vary).

The word "Yamandan" and "Emden" entered the lexicons of Malayalam and Tamil respectively after the bombing of Madras Harbour in 1914 by the SMS Emden. The word in the local language means a humongous or huge and sometimes "a person who dares and works with precision".

In addition, the village of Emden, Illinois in the United States was named after Jacob Emden due to the large number of emigrants from Emden to the village in north-western Logan County, Illinois. Other places in the U.S. named after the town include Emden, Missouri; Embden, Maine and Embden, North Dakota.

== Twin towns – sister cities ==
Emden is twinned with:

- Arkhangelsk, Russia
- Haugesund, Norway
