= Otto VII of Tecklenburg =

Otto VII, Count of Tecklenburg
- Died: 1450
- Noble family: House of Hagen
- Spouses: Ermengarda of Hoya-Nienburg; Aleidis of Plesse
- Father: Nicholas II, Count of Tecklenburg
- Mother: Anna Elisabeth of Moers

Otto VII of Tecklenburg (died 1450) was Count of Tecklenburg from 1426 until his death.

== Life ==
Otto VII was the only son of Count Nicholas II of Tecklenburg and his wife Anna Elisabeth, a daughter of Count Frederick III of Moers. In 1426, he succeeded his father as Count of Tecklenburg. Like his father, he fought many feuds, in an attempt to win back some of the territories his father had lost. The attempt failed, and pushed his county deeper into debt. This accelerated the decline of the county.

He died in 1450, and was succeeded by his eldest son, Nicholas III.

== Marriage and issue ==
Around 1428, he married Ermengarda of Hoya-Nienburg, the daughter of Count Eric I of Hoya. They had two children:

- Nicholas III (d. 1508)
- Adelaide (d. 1477), married in 1453 with Gerhard VI, Count of Oldenburg (d. 1500)

After Ermengarde's death, Otto VII married Aleidis, the daughter of Gottschak VIII of Plesse and had three more children:

- Otto VIII (d. 1493)
- Maria (d. 1493), abbess of St. Boniface abbey in Freckenhorst
- Anna (d. 1508), abbess of Gerresheim Abbey
