= Alte Weser Lighthouse =

Lighthouse in Lower Saxony, Germany

Alte Weser
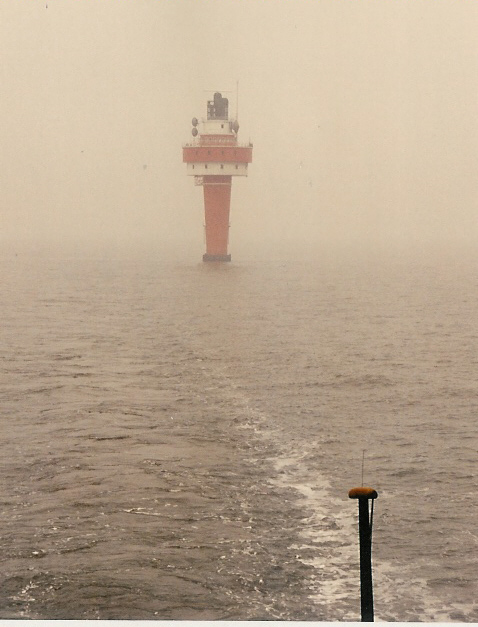
- The lighthouse in 1992
- Location: Offshore, mouth of the Weser River; German Bight
- Coordinates: 53°52′N 8°8′E

Tower
- Constructed: 1964
- Foundation: ferroconcretes (cf. Fig. 2)
- Construction: concrete and steel tower
- Automated: 1972
- Height: 38 metres (125 ft)
- Shape: inverted conical with two-storey observation centre and lantern on top
- Markings: red tower with two white horizontal bands, green lantern
- Fog signal: Horn Mo(AL) 60s

Light
- First lit: 1 September 1964
- Focal height: 33 metres (108 ft)
- Lens: double beltoptics with 400 mm focal distance
- Intensity: 424,000 cd
- Range: 23 nautical miles (43 km; 26 mi)
- Characteristic: F WRG

The Alte Weser Lighthouse is located offshore from the estuary mouth of the river Weser in the German Bight, southern North Sea. It was built on sand between 1961 and 1964. The lighthouse took over duties and replaced the historical Roter Sand Lighthouse on 1 September 1964. The latter had been built from 1883 to 1885.

== General aspects ==
The Alte Weser Lighthouse was built between 1961 and 1964. It consists of steel-coated ferroconcrete and a steel superstructure. It was built offshore into a sand bed at a depth of 11 m below mean sea level. Its height measures about 40 m above msl. Depending on the color of the light beam, its visibility is between 18 and 23 sm. The only inhabited place where the Alte Weser or Roter Sand Lighthouse can be seen with the naked eye is the German island of Wangerooge.

== Technical data ==
The light characteristic is "F WRG", i.e. a continuous light, coloured white, red or green depending on the bearing of the lighthouse. The light is emitted by a 2000 Watt Xenon lamp. On low visibility conditions a foghorn sounds a signal, the Morse code letters "AL", with an interval of one minute.

On the tower a number of additional navigational and meteorological devices are installed next to the optics. Directional antennae and a radar serve as means of security in the Weser approach while an anemometer and an automated tide gauge collect data on wind conditions and water levels. The tower has a built-in emergency power system and provides accommodation for a maintenance crew.

== Construction ==
The previous lighthouse (German: Roter Sand, lit. 'red sand') was constructed in 1885 in the outer Weser waterway of the German Bight. By the end of the 1950s, the lighthouse had been badly damaged by corrosion and leaching of its concrete. To replace the old lighthouse, the Alte Weser was built in the years 1961–1964, not far from the former location. Simultaneously, the conditions for ship traffic in the outer Weser waterway were to be improved and the new lighthouse was to be established as an offshore part of the radar chain on the Weser between Bremen and the North Sea (fig. 1).

The novel form of the tower (fig. 2), its downward tapering tower shaft together with its cantilevered upper storeys, was based on a design by engineer Andreas Carstens, Bremerhaven. The conical design of the tower was intended to minimize exposure to waves and drift ice. The German Waterway Administration, the Wasser- und Schifffahrtsamt (WSA) Bremerhaven as the responsible governmental agency, assigned the task of workmanship to a cooperative of companies: Philipp Holzmann, Strabag Bau AG, Hermann Moeller. This cooperative instructed the Howaldtswerke in Kiel to carry out the steelworks.

The steelworks for the tower shaft, the upper storeys and the equipment were carried out in a dry dock of the Howaldts factory in Kiel (fig. 3). The tower shaft was towed through the Kiel Canal towards its destination site in the Outer-Weser waterway (fig. 6). For this purpose a floating offshore lift platform which had been supplied with a central cut-out for the tower was used. At the site the shaft was lowered and subsequently jetted into the sand to the intended depth. After feeding in a layer of underwater concrete, the shaft was evacuated and the additional layers of ferroconcrete were installed (fig. 5).

Frequently, adequate supply of building materials was hampered and delayed, because relatively small coasters had been contracted for transport, which were quite sensitive to the state of the sea and weather conditions. Timing was especially important in order to ensure joints were constructed correctly. To this end, all building materials needed for the underwater concrete had to arrive on time and without delay. Therefore, an optimal weather period was required.

A further interruption happened due to two accidents. The first was fatal when a sudden leak killed two workers. However, the exact reason for the accident was never fully revealed. The tower shaft which had been lowered and jetted into the sand had to be abandoned. The upper storeys were detached and transported back to Kiel on the offshore lift platform for later use. One year later the upper storeys were re-used on a second tower shaft nearby. The old stump of the tower shaft remains underground today. The storm surge of 1962 which cost many human lives in Hamburg and other places on the German coast had no impact on the construction of the lighthouse. The first accident did however force a new start to the works in Kiel, causing a delay of one year. The second accident happened because of a malfunction of the gripper at the front legs of the offshore lift platform. A second platform had to be used in order to repair and replace the first one. In the third year, after the lift platform had been repaired, the construction works resumed at the tower shaft and were subsequently completed.

Next, the offshore lift platform could pick up the upper storeys which were still stored at Kiel (fig. 6) to join them with the tower shaft in the North Sea. Under favourable weather conditions the upper storeys were placed on top of the tower without complications (fig. 7). Now, the completing works such as installation of the optics including the corresponding blinds and the installation of the standby sets were implemented. The power supply of the lighthouse demanded special attention. A 6 kV cable was run from the Robbenplate Lighthouse (fig. 1) towards Alte Weser, jetted in using a special device (Einspuelstiefel, Fig. 8) and threaded into the tower through a protective cable conduit. In addition, measures had to be taken to adopt the same cable for the planned Tegeler Plate Lighthouse (see below). The foundation of the building was safeguarded with stone ballast poured down on bush mats against rinsing and water erosion. In 1964 the light of Alte Weser Lighthouse went into service (fig. 9). In 1972 the four keepers were displaced when the lighthouse became automated.

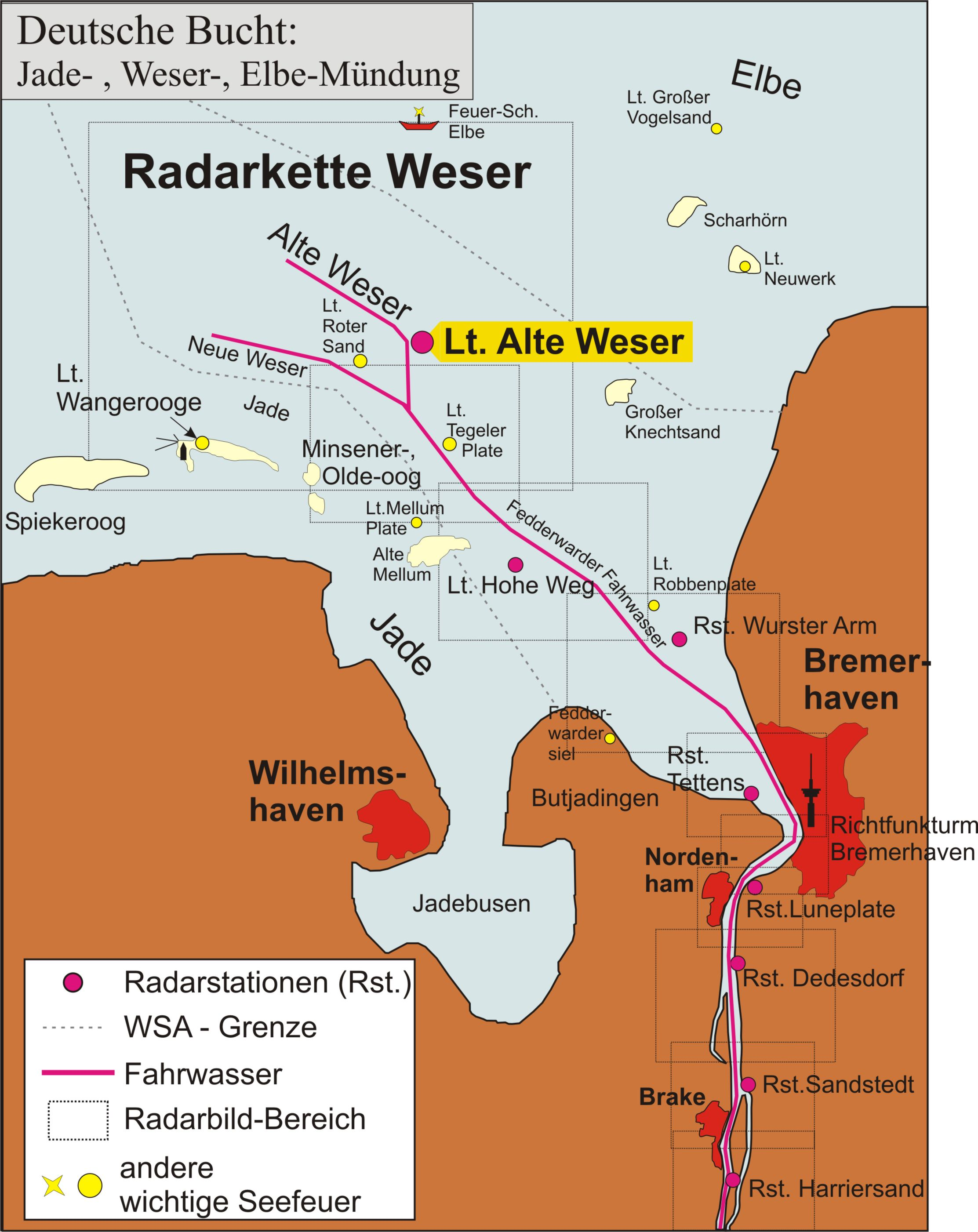
Fig. 1 Radar chain, River Weser

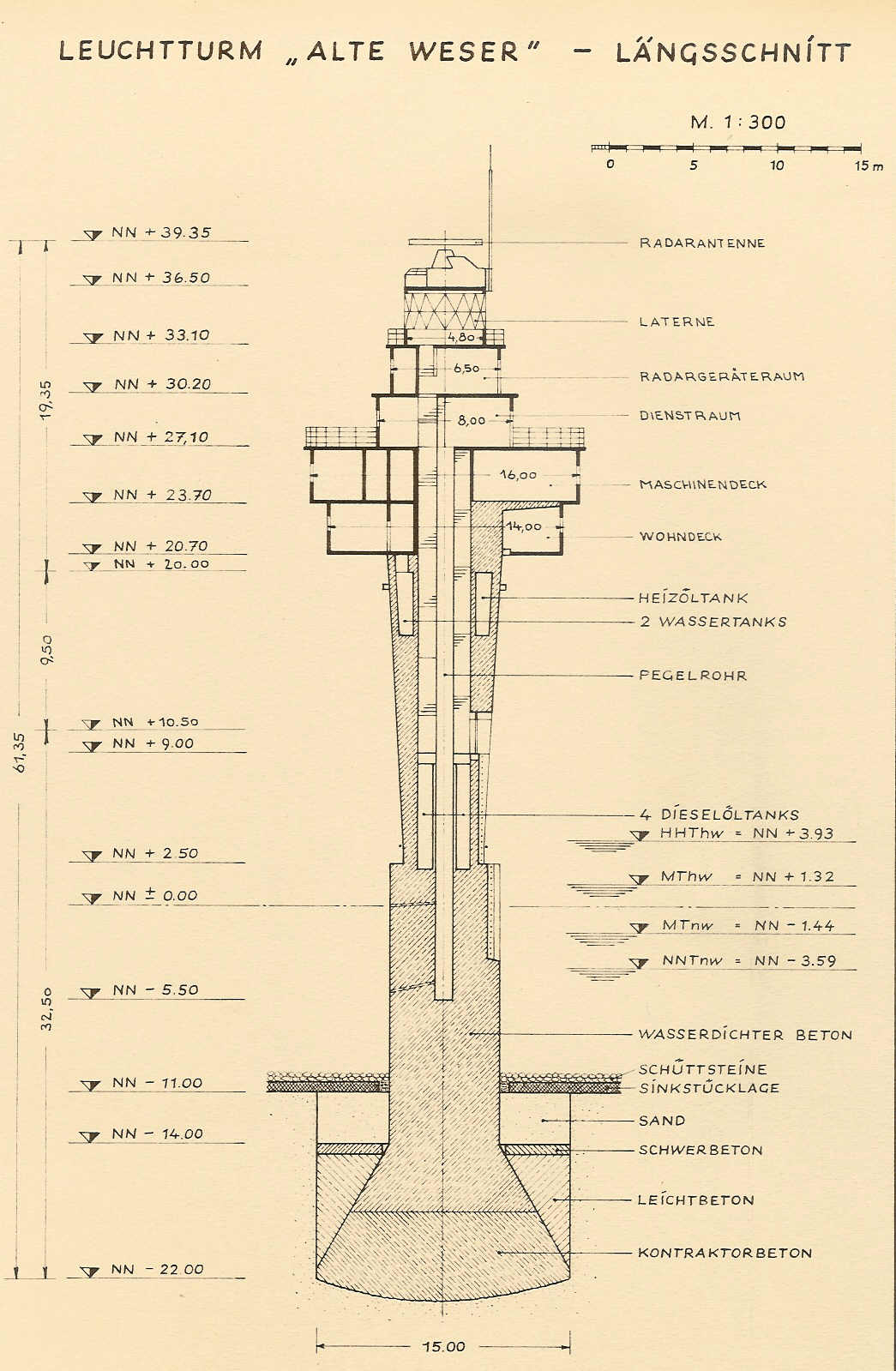
Fig. 2 "Alte Weser": original technical drawing, 1961

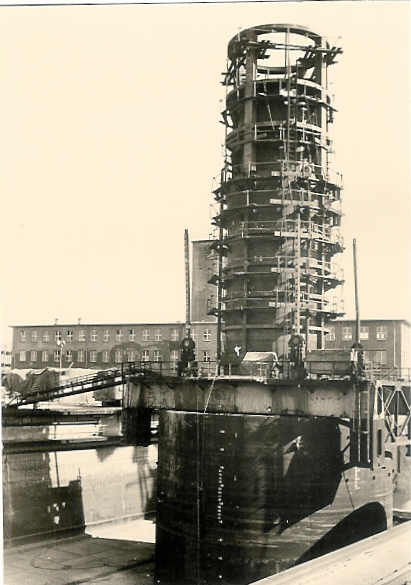
Fig. 3 tower shaft with foundation at the dry-dock of Howaldtswerke in Kiel

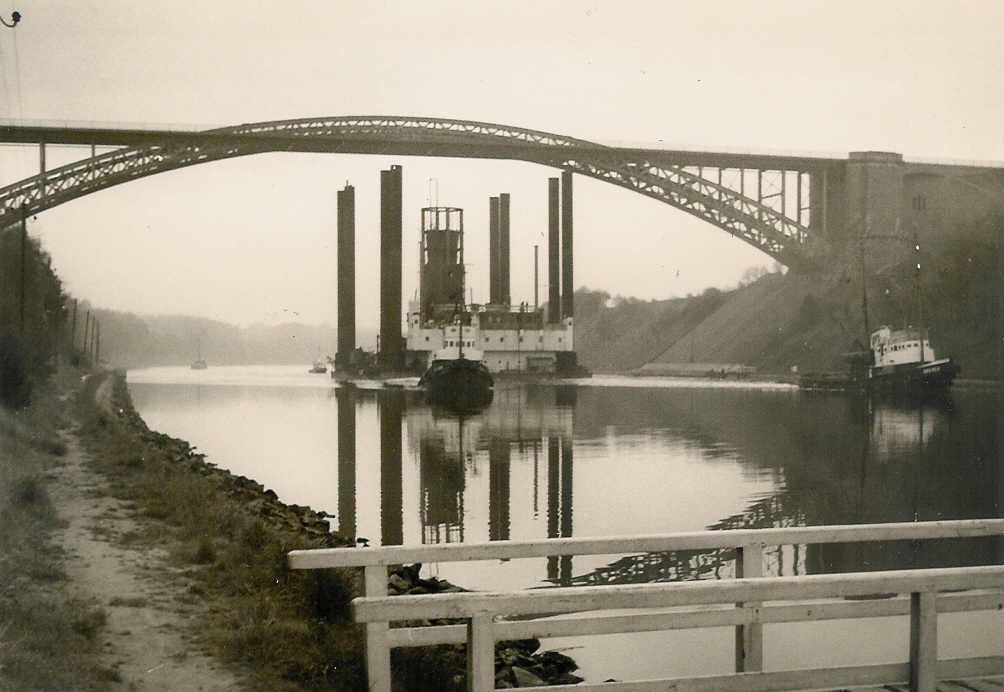
Fig. 4 tower shaft on offshore lift platform passing Levensau on the Kiel Canal

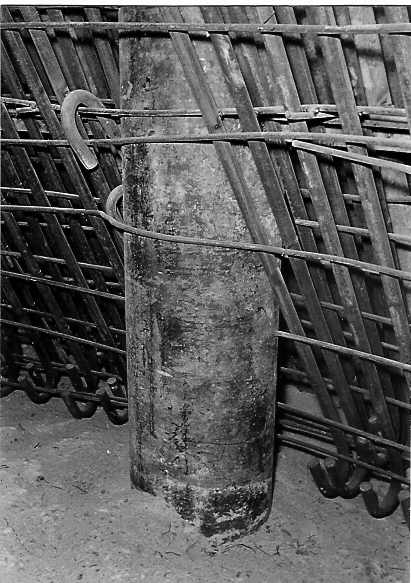
Fig. 5 Surface of concrete and flanking concrete reinforcement.

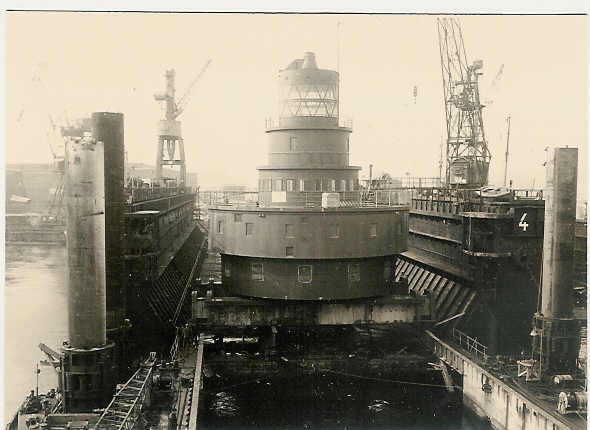
Fig. 6 Upper storeys loaded onto offshore lift platform at Kiel.

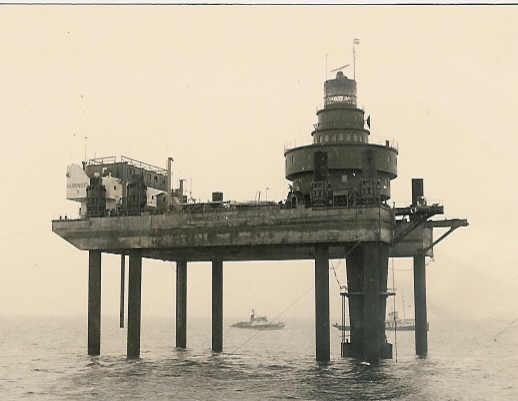
Fig. 7 Upper storeys are lifted onto the tower shaft from the offshore lift platform

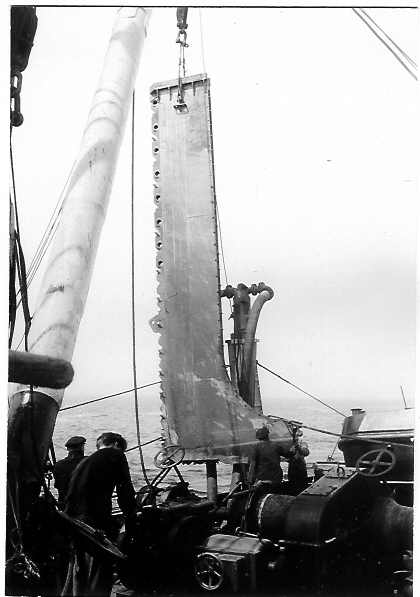
Fig. 8 Jetting boot (Einspuelstiefel)

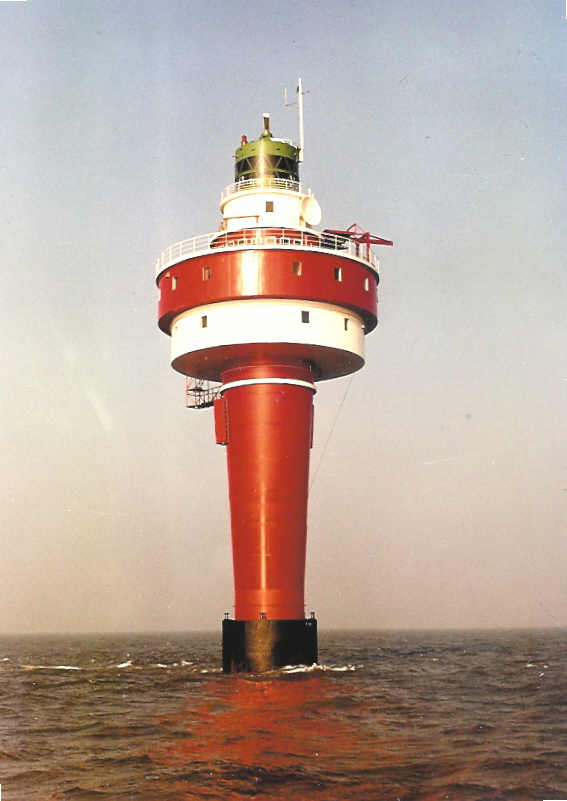
Fig. 9 "Alte Weser", original photo, 1964

=== Tegeler Plate Lighthouse ===
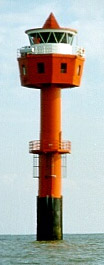
Tegeler Plate Lighthouse

As an additional improvement of the waterway conditions as implemented by the procedure as a whole (see above), construction of another lighthouse was essential. This effort simultaneously made it possible to take the light vessel Bremen out of service. As a location for the new lighthouse the Tegeler Plate sand bar was chosen. The tower shaft, as well as the upper storeys of the Tegeler Plate Lighthouse, were intended to be entirely built as steel construction. The tower shaft's height of about 46 m as well as the local shallow water conditions (i.e. average low tide about 2.50 m above ground level) made it possible to pile jet the tower shaft 18 m deep into the sand in one step. To this end, jetting the tower shaft into sand as a first step was considered to be followed by placing the upper storeys on top as a second step. In this manner corrections of slight discrepancies of the shaft could be made.

After the steelworks had been carried out at Wilhelmhaven, the tower shaft and the upper stories were brought to the intended position by a salvage ship carrying heavy water pump systems, and were jetted into the sandy ground. The power cable already installed at the Alte Weser Lighthouse was integrated. The Tegeler Plate Lighthouse went into service in 1966 – it was unmanned and operated remotely from the beginning. Only emergency quarters were set up for maintenance workers. The base was secured through stone ballasting.

With these arrangements two important steps for the deepening project of the Outer Weser waterway had been accomplished.

== In popular culture ==
Alte Weser Lighthouse was featured on a German stamp in 1976.

Alte Weser Lighthouse, as well as Tegeler Plate, Roter Sand and others, were shown on various paintings by Katharina Noack.

== See also ==
- List of lighthouses and lightvessels in Germany
