= Borkum Great Light =

Lighthouse on Borkum, Germany

Borkum Großer Leuchtturm
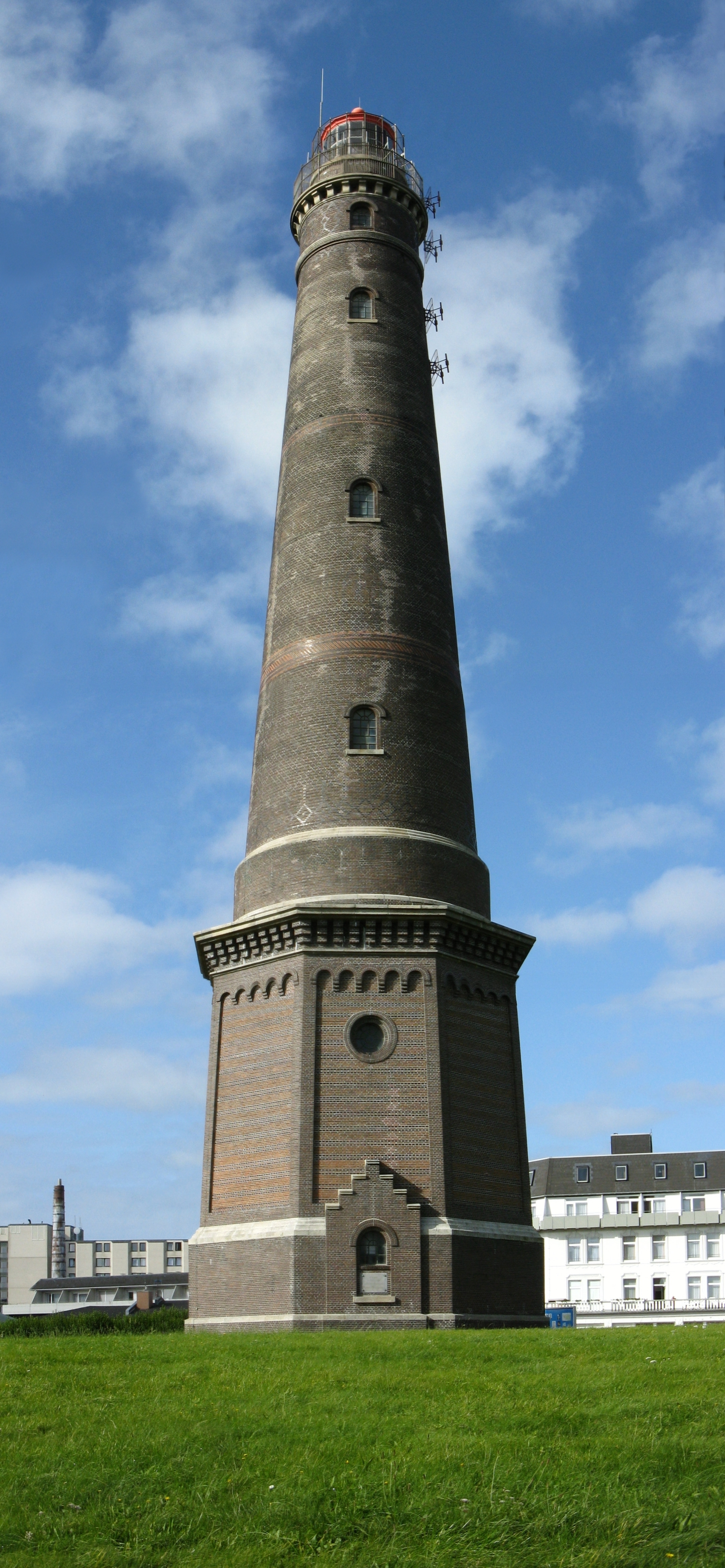
- The lighthouse in 2008
- Location: Borkum, Germany
- Coordinates: 53°35′19.55″N 6°39′43.68″E

Tower
- Constructed: 1817 (first)
- Foundation: 3-story octagonal base
- Construction: brick tower
- Height: 197 feet (60 m)
- Shape: cylindrical tower with balcony and lantern
- Markings: unpainted gray-brown tower, brown basement, red lantern dome.
- Heritage: architectural heritage monument in Lower Saxony

Light
- First lit: 1879
- Focal height: 207 feet (63 m)
- Intensity: 2,000,000 cd
- Range: 24 nautical miles (44 km; 28 mi); 19 nautical miles (35 km; 22 mi) directional white 15 nautical miles (28 km; 17 mi) directional red/green
- Characteristic: Fl (2) W 12s. F WRG depending on direction

Borkum Great Light (from German: Borkum Großer Leuchtturm, "Borkum greater lighthouse"), also known as Borkum Neuer Light (Neuer Leuchtturm, "new lighthouse"), is an active lighthouse on the island of Borkum, Leer district, state of Lower Saxony, Germany. At a height of 197 feet (60 m) it is the twenty-fourth tallest "traditional lighthouse" in the world, as well as the third tallest brick lighthouse in the world. The lighthouse is located at the west side of the Borkum Island. It is the landfall light for the Ems estuary and the port of Emden, serving also as a day mark.

This lighthouse also bears a directional continuous light at a height of 151 feet (46 m) to three different directions with the colors white, red and green.

The tower was built in the summer of 1879 in a record time of six months, following a fire at the old lighthouse.

The site is open, and the tower is open to the public daily April through October and on Thursday, Friday, and Sunday afternoons November through March.

== See also ==
- List of lighthouses and lightvessels in Germany
- List of tallest lighthouses in the world
