= Olhörn Lighthouse =

Lighthouse in Schleswig-Holstein, Germany

Olhörn lighthouse Leuchtturm Olhörn
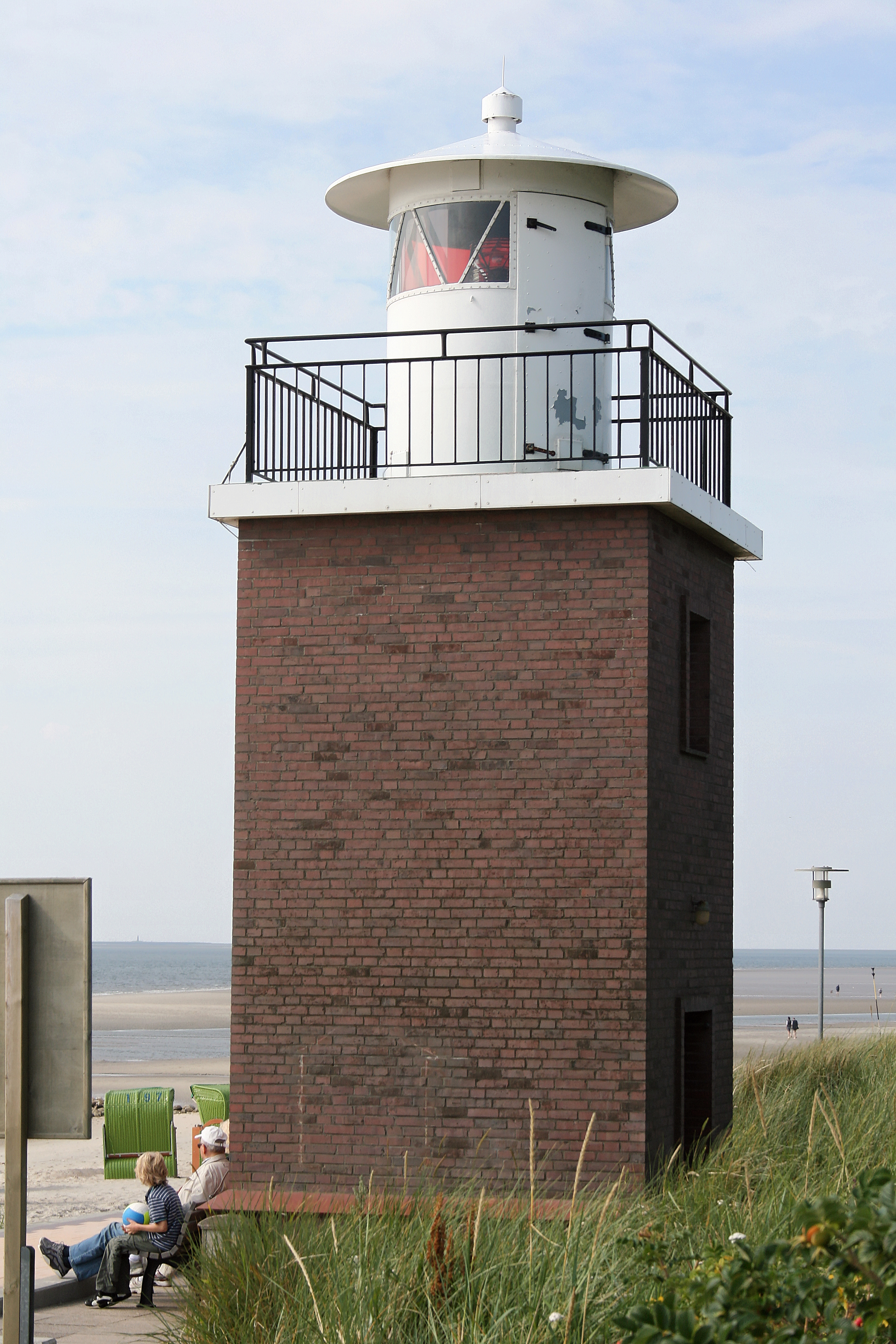
- Location: North Sea, Wyk auf Föhr, Germany
- Coordinates: 54°40′51″N 8°33′59″E

Tower
- Constructed: 1952
- Construction: masonry (tower), brick (façade)
- Automated: 1980
- Height: 8.6 m (28 ft)
- Shape: square
- Markings: Unpainted (tower), white (lantern)
- Operator: Wasserstraßen- und Schifffahrtsamt Tönning (–2021), Wasserstraßen- und Schifffahrtsamt Elbe-Nordsee (2021–)

Light
- First lit: 1952
- Focal height: 10 m (33 ft)
- Lens: Fresnel lens
- Range: 13 nmi (24 km; 15 mi) (white), 10 nmi (19 km; 12 mi) (red), 9 nmi (17 km; 10 mi) (green)
- Characteristic: Oc(4) WR 15s

Olhörn Lighthouse (German: Leuchtturm Olhörn, also Leuchtfeuer Olhörn and sometimes Leuchtturm Olderhörn) is a small lighthouse on the German North Sea island of Föhr in Schleswig-Holstein.

The lighthouse is located on the southeastern corner of the island of Föhr, inside the town of Wyk auf Föhr in the Nordfriesland district. It is located on a shallow geestland ridge overlooking the southern beach of Wyk.

It was erected in 1952 to replace a light beacon from 1892. The tower is 8.6 metres (28 ft) tall with a focal height of 10 m above mean high water. It has a near square shape and was built of massive masonry that was encased by reddish brown bricks. On the gallery there is the lantern room made of metal; it is painted white. The automated lighthouse serves as a cross light for navigation in the Norderaue tidal channel between the mainland port of Dagebüll and the islands of Föhr and Amrum. As such it is a sea mark and also a minor daymark.

== See also ==
- List of lighthouses and lightvessels in Germany
