= Voslapp Rear Range Light =

Lighthouse in Wilhelmshaven, Germany, part of Voslapp range lights

Voslapp Rear Range Light Voslapp Oberfeuer
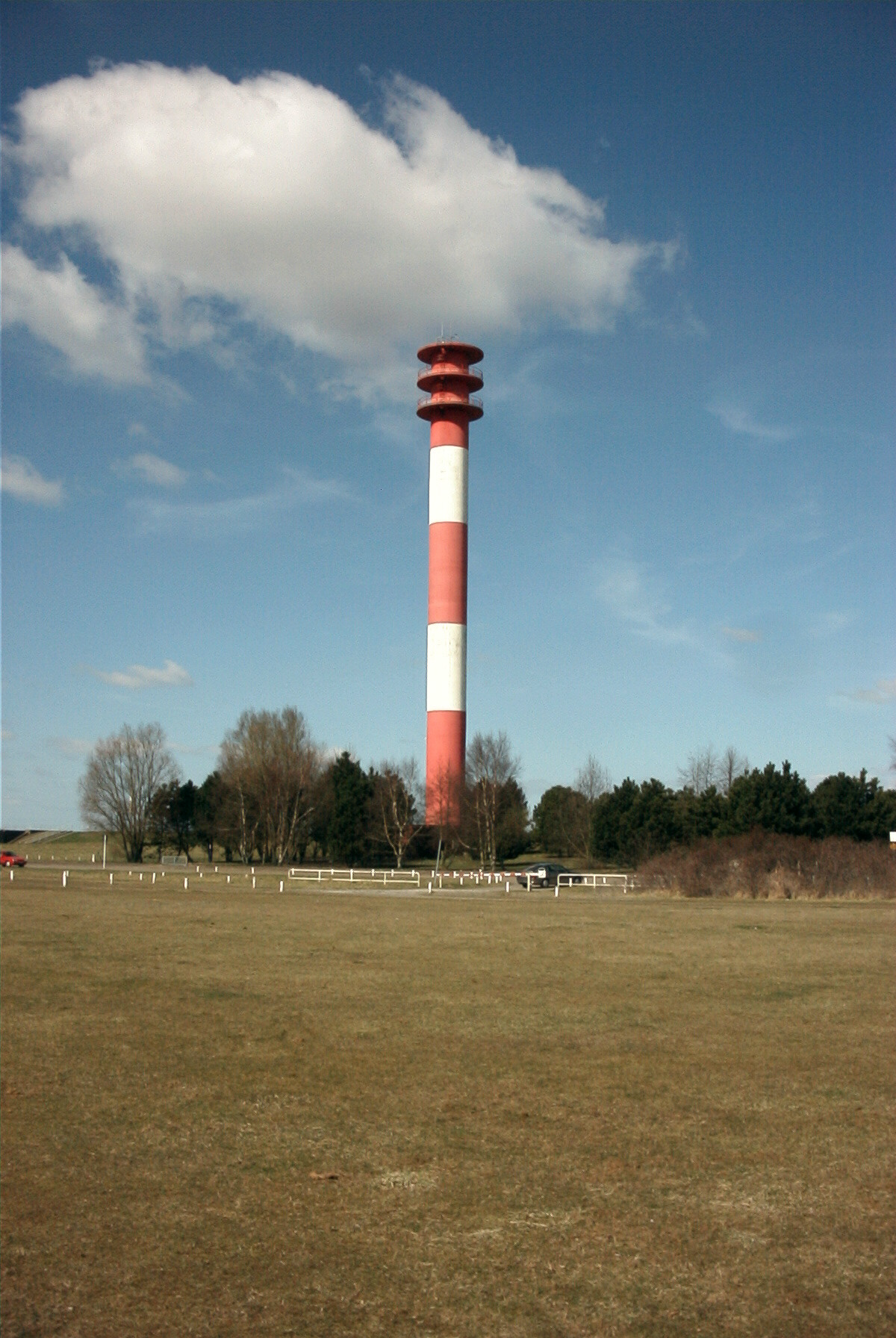
- Location: Wilhelmshaven, Germany
- Coordinates: 53°34′53.8″N 8°7′51.1″E

Tower
- Constructed: 1962
- Foundation: 26 posts, ø 50 centimetres (20 in), approx. 15.5 metres (51 ft) long
- Construction: concrete tower
- Height: 201 feet (61 m)
- Shape: cylindrical tower with three galleries
- Markings: tower painted with red and white horizontal bands
- Operator: WSA Wilhelmshaven

Light
- Focal height: 198 feet (60 m)
- Intensity: 1,590,000 cd
- Range: 27 nautical miles (50 km; 31 mi)
- Characteristic: white light, 3s on, 3s off, synchronized with Voslapp Front Range Light

Voslapp Rear Range Light (German: Voslapp Oberfeuer) is an active lighthouse and range light in Voslapp, state of Lower Saxony, Germany. At a height of 201 feet (61 m) it is the twenty-second tallest "traditional lighthouse" in the world. It is located 4.3 kilometres (2.7 mi) south-southwest of Voslapp Front Range Light, behind the dike at the village of Voslapp, about 8 kilometres (5.0 mi) north of Wilhelmshaven.

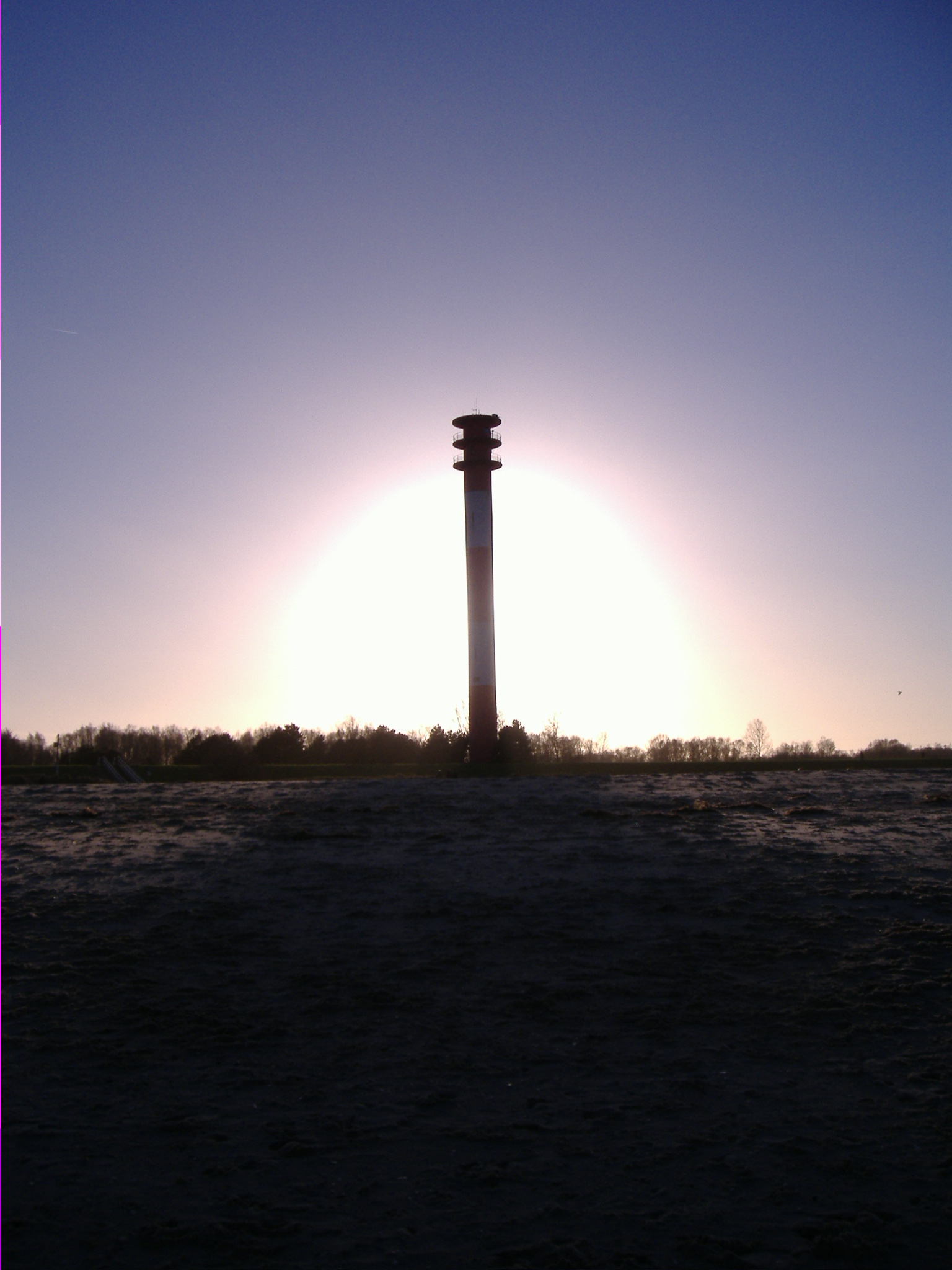
Evening view

The tower is 4.5 metres (15 ft) in diameter. The lamp used is a 250 W lamp.

The Voslapp Range Lights replaced a single lighthouse which was built in 1907.

The site is open, but the tower is closed to the public.

== See also ==
- List of lighthouses and lightvessels in Germany
- List of tallest lighthouses in the world
