= Bremerhaven Lighthouse =

Lighthouse in Free Hanseatic City of Bremen, Germany

Bremerhaven Lighthouse Bremerhaven Oberfeuer
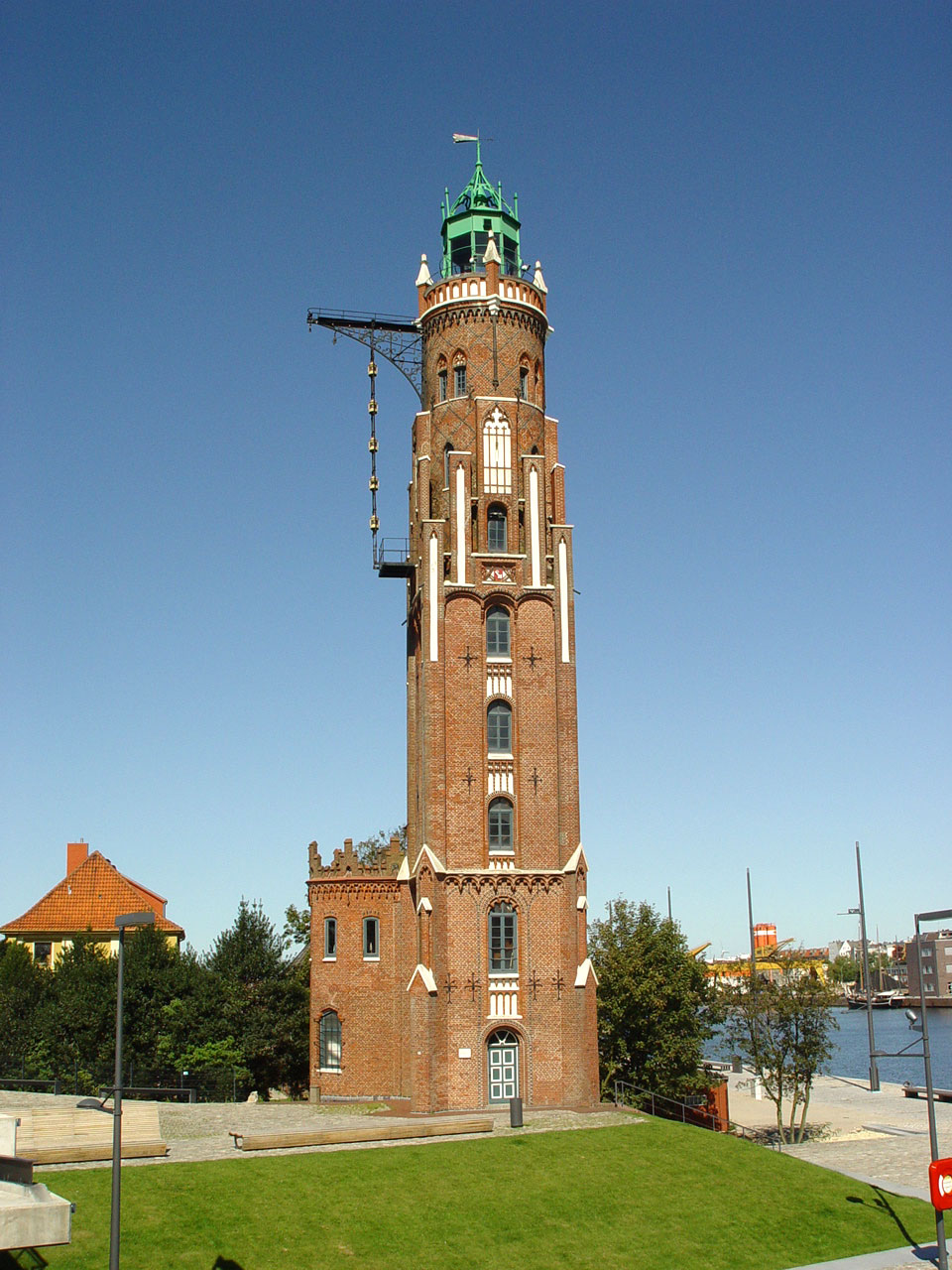
- Location: Bremerhaven, Germany
- Coordinates: 53°32′46.7″N 8°34′12.4″E

Tower
- Constructed: 1855
- Construction: brick tower
- Automated: 1951
- Height: 37 metres (121 ft)
- Shape: square base Brick Gothic tower with octagonal prism lantern
- Markings: unpainted bricks with white ornaments, green lantern
- Operator: WSA Bremerhaven
- Heritage: protected cultural heritage monument in Bremen (state)

Light
- First lit: 1856
- Focal height: 37 metres (121 ft)
- Range: 8 nmi (15 km)
- Characteristic: Iso W 4s

The Bremerhaven Lighthouse, also known as the Simon Loschen Tower or Loschen Lighthouse, is the rear light of a pair of leading lights at the New Harbour of Bremerhaven, Germany. It is the oldest operative lighthouse on the mainland along Germany's North Sea shore and is counted among the city's landmarks.

== History ==
From 1853 to 1855 the lighthouse was built in the style of northern German Brick Gothic at the northern side of the harbour's lock from 1852, using plans by architect Simon Loschen from Bremen. It went operational in 1856. Next to the lighthouse there is another brick house that used to serve as quarters and service building for the lighthouse and lock keepers and was partially destroyed during World War II.

The fire was first lit by a gas flame and was later electrified in 1925. It was automated in 1951.

== Today's function ==
The original range of leading lights pointing down the river Weser was replaced by another lighting in 1959. For the upstream range that is still in use today, the tower still serves as the rear light. The corresponding front light Unterfeuer Bremerhaven is situated in a small red and white lighthouse on the southern pier of the lock, also called "the minaret" by locals.

== Gallery ==
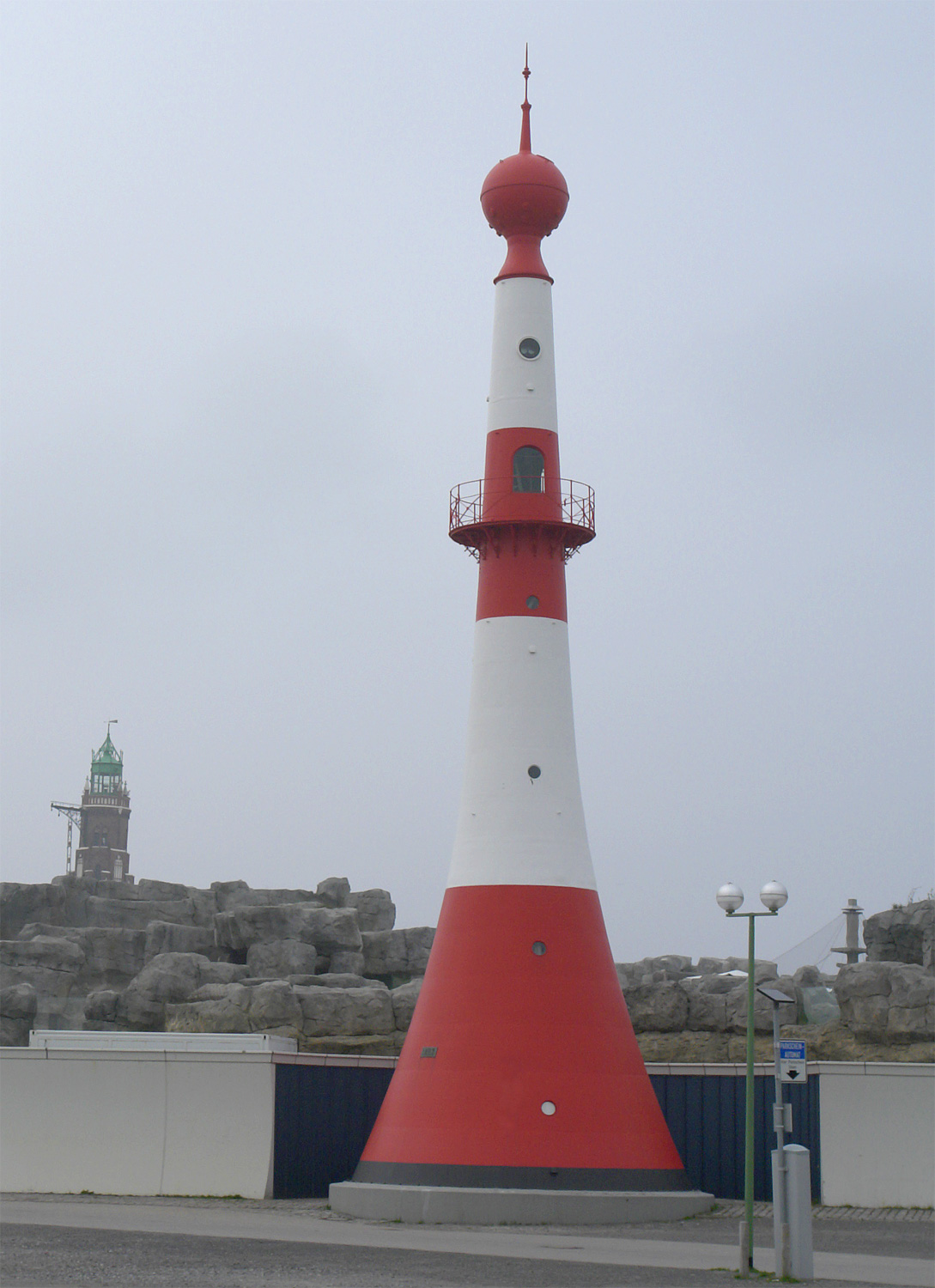
The Bremerhaven Front Light

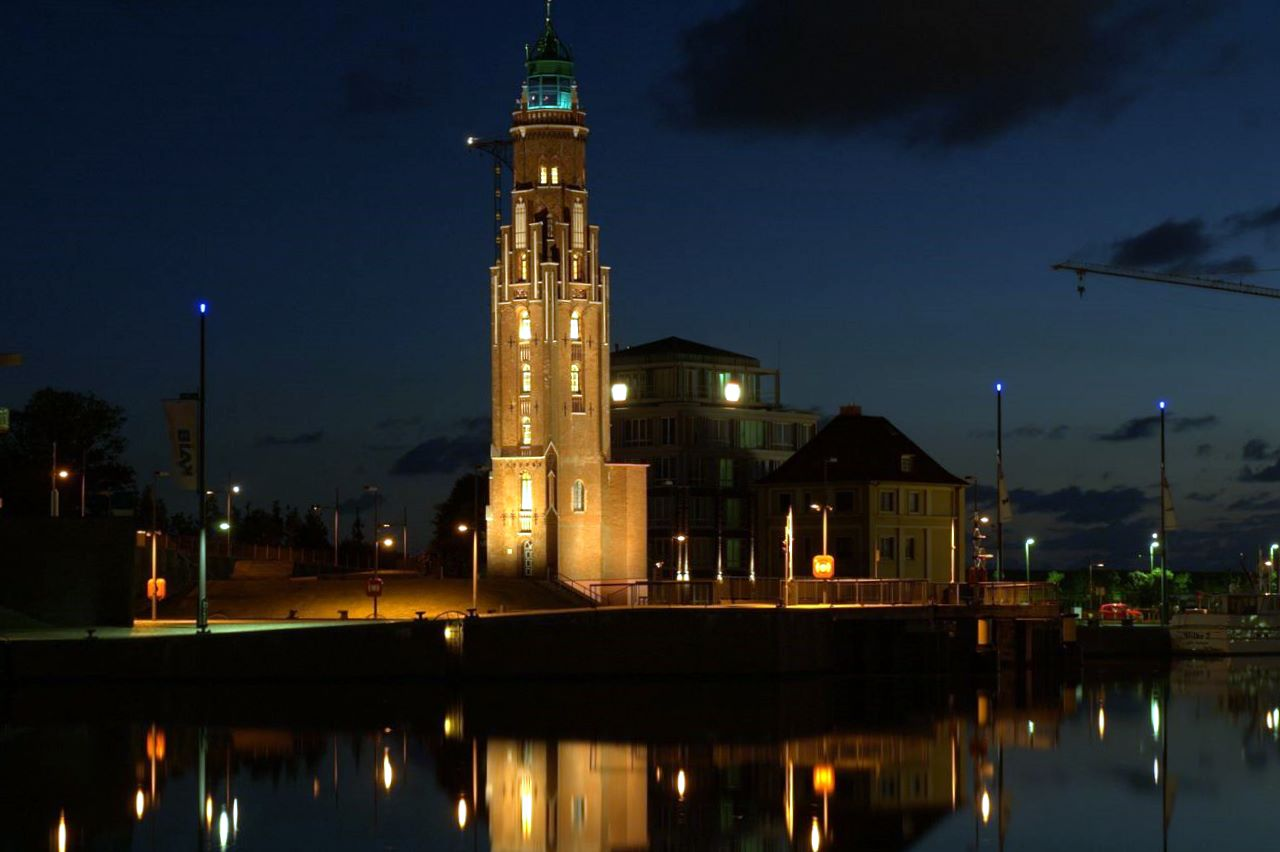
The lighthouse at night

== See also ==
- List of lighthouses and lightvessels in Germany
