= List of lighthouses in Germany =

This is a list of lighthouses in Germany.

== List ==
Name	Image	Water body	State	Location	Built	Notes
Amrum		North Sea	Schleswig-Holstein	Amrum island 54°37′52.24″N 8°21′16.91″E	1873	
Nebel		North Sea	Schleswig-Holstein	Nebel, Amrum 54°38′43.2″N 8°21′40.4″E	1981	The construction is identical to the Nieblum light at Föhr island.
Wriakhörn		North Sea	Schleswig-Holstein	Amrum island near the main lighthouse		
Norddorf		North Sea	Schleswig-Holstein	Norddorf, Amrum 54°40′8.98″N 8°18′30.65″E	1906	
Büsum		North Sea	Schleswig-Holstein	Büsum 54°7′36.54″N 8°51′29.64″E	1913	
Dagebüll		North Sea	Schleswig-Holstein	Dagebüll 54°43′31″N 8°41′59.5″E	1929	Deactivated in 1988
Heligoland		North Sea	Schleswig-Holstein	Heligoland island 54°10′54.71″N 7°52′56.38″E	1952	
Helgoland Düne		North Sea	Schleswig-Holstein	Düne (Heligoland) 54°10′56.26″N 7°54′50.58″E	1936	
Hörnum		North Sea	Schleswig-Holstein	Hörnum, Sylt island 54°45′14.73″N 8°17′31.68″E	1907	
Kampen		North Sea	Schleswig-Holstein	Kampen, Sylt island 54°56′46.43″N 8°20′26.47″E	1855	Deactivated in 1975.
List Ost and List West		North Sea	Schleswig-Holstein	List, Sylt island 55°2′57.95″N 8°26′37.52″E (List Ost); 55°3′10.56″N 8°24′5.12″E (List West)	1858	These twin lighthouses are Germany's northernmost lighthouses.
Nieblum		North Sea	Schleswig-Holstein	Nieblum, Föhr island 54°41′3.89″N 8°29′8.43″E	1981	The construction is identical to the Nebel light at Amrum.
Oland		North Sea	Schleswig-Holstein	Oland island 54°40′28.83″N 8°41′12.94″E	1929	Germany's only lighthouse with a thatched roof
Olhörn		North Sea	Schleswig-Holstein	Wyk auf Föhr 54°40′52.82″N 8°33′58.64″E	1952	
Pellworm		North Sea	Schleswig-Holstein	Pellworm island 54°29′46.63″N 8°39′57.49″E	1907	
Rotes Kliff		North Sea	Schleswig-Holstein	Kampen, Sylt island 54.965662°N 8.337812°E	1913	
St. Peter-Böhl		North Sea	Schleswig-Holstein	Eiderstedt peninsula at the entrance to the Eider estuary 54°17′14.32″N 8°39′7.57″E	1892	
Westerheversand		North Sea	Schleswig-Holstein	Westerhever 54°22′24.11″N 8°38′23.69″E	1908	One of the best-known lighthouses in Germany and a popular site for weddings.
Neuwerk		North Sea	Hamburg	Neuwerk island in the Elbe river estuary 53°54′54.8″N 8°29′45″E	1814	Originally built in the 14th century as a watchtower, this lighthouse is the oldest building on the German coastline.
Blankenese Low		North Sea	Hamburg	Elbe river 53°33′27.8″N 9°47′44.66″E	1984	
Blankenese High		North Sea	Hamburg	Elbe river 53°33′21.3″N 9°48′58.36″E	1983	
Bremerhaven		North Sea	Bremen	Bremerhaven	1853	This tower serves as the rear light in a pair of leading lights.
Brinkamahof		North Sea	Bremen	Bremerhaven	1912	Deactivated and relocated in 1980
Alte Weser		North Sea	Lower Saxony	Outer Weser estuary	1964	
Arngast		North Sea	Lower Saxony	Jade Bight	1910	Listed as a historic building in Germany.
Borkum Old		North Sea	Lower Saxony	Borkum island	1817	Established in a tower that dates back to 1576, this lighthouse served as a daybeacon until 1817 when a lantern was added. It was heavily damaged by a fire in 1879 which led to the construction of Borkum Great Light. After its restoration the old lighthouse became a weather and maritime traffic control station. It was transferred to a local historic association in 1982.
Borkum Great Light		North Sea	Lower Saxony	Borkum island	1879	This tower was built to replace the Borkum Old Lighthouse when the latter was damaged by a fire.
Campen		North Sea	Lower Saxony	Krummhörn	1891	With 65 metres (213 ft), this skeletal framework construction is Germany's tallest lighthouse, and it also ranks among the tallest of its kind worldwide.
Cuxhaven		North Sea	Lower Saxony	Cuxhaven	1805	Deactivated in 2001. Built during the Napoleonic wars by the city of Hamburg, the fire as extinguished shortly after until the end of the war in 1814. In 1899, Karl Ferdinand Braun used the site to conduct early experiments in radio transmission.
Kugelbake		North Sea	Lower Saxony	Cuxhaven	1940s	While not a lighthouse, this unlit wooden daybeacon is an iconic landmark for the city of Cuxhaven.
Eckwarderhörne		North Sea	Lower Saxony	Eckwarden, Butjadingen	1962	Deactivated in 2012, this tower used to serve as the rear light in a pair of leading lights with the front station being in Mundahn. After its deactivation the Eckwarderhörne tower was declared a historic site by the state of Lower Saxony.
Emden		North Sea	Lower Saxony	Emden at the Ems estuary	1913	When the tower was renovated in 1982, the old lantern was replaced and relocated.
Hofe Leading Light		North Sea	Lower Saxony	Wremen	1974	
Hohe Weg		North Sea	Lower Saxony	Outer Weser estuary	1856	
Hooksielplate		North Sea	Lower Saxony	Jade Bight	1976	While the light was deactivated in 1998, the tower continues to serve as a radar station.
Imsum		North Sea	Lower Saxony	Langen near Bremerhaven		Deactivated in 1996. The tower was removed from its original location in 2005 to allow for the expansion of a container shipping terminal, and was donated to the German Maritime Museum.
Knock		North Sea	Lower Saxony	Knock, 15 km west of Emden	1970	The tower serves as part of the Dutch-German Vessel Traffic Control Centre Ems.
Mellumplate		North Sea	Lower Saxony	North of Mellum island	1946	
Memmert		North Sea	Lower Saxony	Memmert island	1992	Deactivated in 1986 and rebuilt as a replica on Juist island.
Minsener Oog Buhne A		North Sea	Lower Saxony	Minsener Oog island	1939	Deactivated in 1998, the lighthouse is being undermined by the sea and may eventually collapse.
Minsener Oog Buhne C		North Sea	Lower Saxony	Minsener Oog island	1939	Deactivated in 1998.
Norderney		North Sea	Lower Saxony	Norderney island	1874	Restored extensively in 2004–5.
Pilsum		North Sea	Lower Saxony	Pilsum	1889	Deactivated in 1915. The building was featured in the film Otto: The Alien from East Frisia by comedian Otto Waalkes.
Roter Sand		North Sea	Lower Saxony	Outer Weser estuary	1885	
Sandstedt		Weser river	Lower Saxony	Sandstedt	1898	Deactivated in 1981.
Schillig Lighthouse		North Sea	Lower Saxony	Schillig, Jade Bight	1961	Deactivated in 1987.
Tossens Leading Lights		North Sea	Lower Saxony	Tossens	1987	
Tossens Old Rear Light		North Sea	Lower Saxony	Tossens	1973	While the light was deactivated in 1987 following the construction of the new range, the tower still serves as a radar station.
Tegeler Plate		North Sea	Lower Saxony	Outer Weser estuary	1965	This lighthouse replaced the Bremen lightship.
Voslapp Rear Range Light		North Sea	Lower Saxony	Voslapp, north of Wilhelmshaven	1962	
Wangerooge Old Lighthouse		North Sea	Lower Saxony	Wangerooge island	1856	Deactivated in 1969, this station was replaced by the new Wangerooge Lighthouse. It is owned by the Wangerooge municipality and serves as a museum.
Wangerooge New Lighthouse		North Sea	Lower Saxony	Wangerooge island	1969	Built as a landfall light for supertankers bound for Wilhelmshaven.
Wilhelmshaven		North Sea	Lower Saxony	Wilhelmshaven	2006	When the original tower was sold and relocated in 2005, public outrage resulted in the construction of an exact replica at the Wilhelmshaven navy pier.
Wybelsum		North Sea	Lower Saxony	Wybelsum, Emden	1970	
Bülk Lighthouse		Baltic Sea	Schleswig-Holstein	Entrance to Kiel Fjord	1865	There had been a lighthouse at the site since 1807 but it was destroyed by lightning in 1863. The current tower was built as a replacement.
Dahmeshöved		Baltic Sea	Schleswig-Holstein	Dahme at the entrance to the Lübeck Bay	1880	A separate watchtower was added to the station in 1939.
Eckernförde Old Lighthouse		Baltic Sea	Schleswig-Holstein	Eckernförde	1907	Deactivated in 1986 it was replaced by a concrete structure resembling an air traffic control tower.
Eckernförde New Lighthouse		Baltic Sea	Schleswig-Holstein	Eckernförde	1986	This tower replaced the Eckernförde Old Lighthouse of 1907.
Fehmarnbelt Lightship		Baltic Sea	Schleswig-Holstein	1908	1985	Originally used on the 'Außeneider' position in the Eider estuary of the North Sea, the vessel was relocated to the Fehmarn Belt in 1965. It was retired in 1985.
Flügge		Baltic Sea	Schleswig-Holstein	South side of Fehmarn island	1916	A historic landmark of Fehmarn, this tower had a leading light added in 1977. During renovations in the 1970s the building was covered in red and white fibreglass panels but the tower is made of unpainted bricks. The tower serves as rear light in a range of leading lights together with Strukkamphuk Lighthouse.
Heiligenhafen		Baltic Sea	Schleswig-Holstein	Heiligenhafen	1938	The station was established already in 1885 with a light on top of a fish packing house. When the latter burnt down in 1907, a stone tower was erected to serve as lighthouse instead. The present building was established in 1938.
Kalkgrund		Baltic Sea	Schleswig-Holstein	Flensburg Fjord	1963	This lighthouse in the middle of the Flensburg Fjord replaced a lightvessel station.
Kiel		Baltic Sea	Schleswig-Holstein	Offshore at the transition from Kiel Bay to Kiel Fjord	1967	The lighthouse serves also as a maritime pilot station.
Friedrichsort		Baltic Sea	Schleswig-Holstein	Kiel Fjord	1971	This tower on an artificial island replaced an older lighthouse from 1866.
Holtenau Nord		Baltic Sea	Schleswig-Holstein	Kiel, at the northeastern locks of the Kiel Canal	1895	The lighthouse includes a memorial hall for the German emperors William I, Frederick III and William II who were all involved in ceremonies surrounding the construction of the canal. William II laid the cornerstone of the lighthouse.
Travemünde		Baltic Sea	Schleswig-Holstein	Travemünde, the port of Lübeck	1539	A light station at Travemünde can be traced back to 1226 and the first lightkeeper was recorded in 1316. This historic tower remained in use until 1974 when a nearby high-rise hotel was used to host the navigational light. The lighthouse tower is now a museum.
Marienleuchte, Fehmarn		Baltic Sea	Schleswig-Holstein	Fehmarn island	1967	The German name Marienleuchte [Marie's light] refers to Danish queen-consort Marie of Hesse-Kassel who inaugurated the first lighthouse in this place on her birthday in 1832. The latter building was replaced by a modern tower in 1967.
Neuland Lighthouse		Baltic Sea	Schleswig-Holstein	Hohwacht Bay, 1 km north of Behrensdorf	1916	The tower was deactivated in 1996 but has since been used as a warning light by the German Navy during live firing exercises in the area. It is featured in the coat of arms of Behrensdorf.
Pelzerhaken		Baltic Sea	Schleswig-Holstein	8 km south of Neustadt in Holstein	1937	This tower was built around an older Danish lighthouse from 1842.
Schleimünde		Baltic Sea	Schleswig-Holstein	At the mouth of the Schlei inlet	1871	
Strukkamphuk		Baltic Sea	Schleswig-Holstein	South side of Fehmarn island	1935	This tower forms a range of leading lights together with Flügge Lighthouse which serves as the rear light.
Staberhuk		Baltic Sea	Schleswig-Holstein	Fehmarn island	1904	The tower was originally built with yellow bricks but it turned out that those were not suited for severe Baltic Sea winters. Therefore, the north and west sides were later covered in red bricks which makes the lighthouse appear to have vertical red and yellow stripes. The Fresnel lens installed in the lantern was originally used in the Heligoland Lighthouse while that North Sea island was under British administration in the 19th century. It was transferred to Staberhuk when the lighthouse in Heligoland was replaced in 1901.
Westermarkelsdorf		Baltic Sea	Schleswig-Holstein	Fehmarn island	1881	The tower was heightened in 1902 which left a seam in the wall that is still visible today.
Cape Arkona Lighthouse		Baltic Sea	Mecklenburg-Vorpommern	Cape Arkona, Rügen island	1826	This site has two lighthouses and a radio beacon. The older lighthouse was built in 1826 to plans by Karl Friedrich Schinkel. In 1902, an electrically lit tower was erected nearby to replace Schinkel's lighthouse.
Bastorf		Baltic Sea	Mecklenburg-Vorpommern	Bastorf at the Mecklenburg Bight	1878	With a focal height of 95.5 metres (313 ft) above sea level, this lighthouse has the highest lantern position in Germany.
Darßer Ort		Baltic Sea	Mecklenburg-Vorpommern	Darß	1848	The keeper's house has been turned into an aquarium and museum of natural history by the German Oceanographic Museum.
Gollwitz		Baltic Sea	Mecklenburg-Vorpommern	Poel island	1953	An older skeletal tower at this station was replaced in 1953 by a short lighthouse overlooking the keeper's house. The light was later elevated to a new mast to form a range of leading lights. After the reunification of Germany, the new mast was removed and a sector light was established in the 1953 facility.
Greifswalder Oie		Baltic Sea	Mecklenburg-Vorpommern	Greifswalder Oie island	1855	The current tower replaced an older lighthouse from 1832. It is the landfall light for ships en route to Stralsund.
Gellen		Baltic Sea	Mecklenburg-Vorpommern	Hiddensee island	1905	
Dornbusch Lighthouse		Baltic Sea	Mecklenburg-Vorpommern	Dornbusch (Hiddensee)	1888	The site owes its name to thorny bushes that are abundant in the area.
Kollicker Ort		Baltic Sea	Mecklenburg-Vorpommern	Rügen island	1904	The construction is identical to Ranzow Lighthouse.
Maltzien		Baltic Sea	Mecklenburg-Vorpommern	Southeastern part of Rügen island	1934	This is the front light in a range for the approach to Stralsund harbour.
Peenemünde		Baltic Sea	Mecklenburg-Vorpommern	Offshore 4 km north of Peenemünde	1954	
Prora		Baltic Sea	Mecklenburg-Vorpommern	Prora, Rügen island	1986	Built for telecommunication purposes rather than navigation, it was deactivated in 1999.
Ranzow		Baltic Sea	Mecklenburg-Vorpommern	Northern shore of Rügen island	1905	Originally built on the Jasmund peninsula it was deactivated in 1999 and relocated to Cape Arkona in 2002 for display. The construction is identical to Kollicker Ort Lighthouse.
Sassnitz East Pier Light		Baltic Sea	Mecklenburg-Vorpommern	Sassnitz, Rügen island	1937	This lighthouse is located at the end of a 1.5 kilometres (0.93 mi) pier in the former ferry port of Sassnitz.
Timmendorf		Baltic Sea	Mecklenburg-Vorpommern	Poel island	1872	A protected historic site, the facility is also being used as a maritime pilot station for the port of Wismar.
Ueckermünde		Baltic Sea	Mecklenburg-Vorpommern	Ueckermünde at the mouth of the river Uecker	2000	
Warnemünde Lighthouse		Baltic Sea	Mecklenburg-Vorpommern	Warnemünde	1898	Navigational lights have been displayed at Warnemünde since 1248. Proposed already in the 1860s as a replacement for an old light, the current tower was established only in 1898. It has become a landmark for the Rostock area.
Wustrow		Baltic Sea	Mecklenburg-Vorpommern	Wustrow	1933	The station was established in 1911 as a fog warning site. In 1993, a separate lighthouse was built. Because the site became increasingly endangered by high-rising floods, a new mast was erected in 2013, and the old tower was deactivated in 2014.
Plauer See		Plauer See	Mecklenburg-Vorpommern	Plau am See	2012	The tower itself was erected as a look-out and is open to the public from April to September. A sector light is installed on top of it to mark the entrance into the river Elde from the lake.
Lindau Lighthouse		Lake Constance	Bavaria	At the harbour entrance to Lindau	1853	The lighthouse and the entire port of Lindau were originally built by the Bavarian Railway Company and later used to be operated by the shipping department for Lake Constance of Deutsche Bahn. Eventually the port was sold to the city works of Constance in 2002 together with the Bodensee-Schiffsbetriebe GmbH shipping company. After several years of negotiations the port area and thus the lighthouse were transferred to the town of Lindau in April 2010.
Konstanz East Pier Light		Lake Constance	Baden-Württemberg	Konstanz	1890	The light is mounted on a mast on top of a building at the end of the east mole of the port of Konstanz.
Helios tower		None	North Rhine-Westphalia	Cologne	1894/1895	Lighthouse of the former Helios AG for test and research purposes.

== See also ==
- Lists of lighthouses and lightvessels
