= Blankenese Low Lighthouse =

Lighthouse in Hamburg, Germany

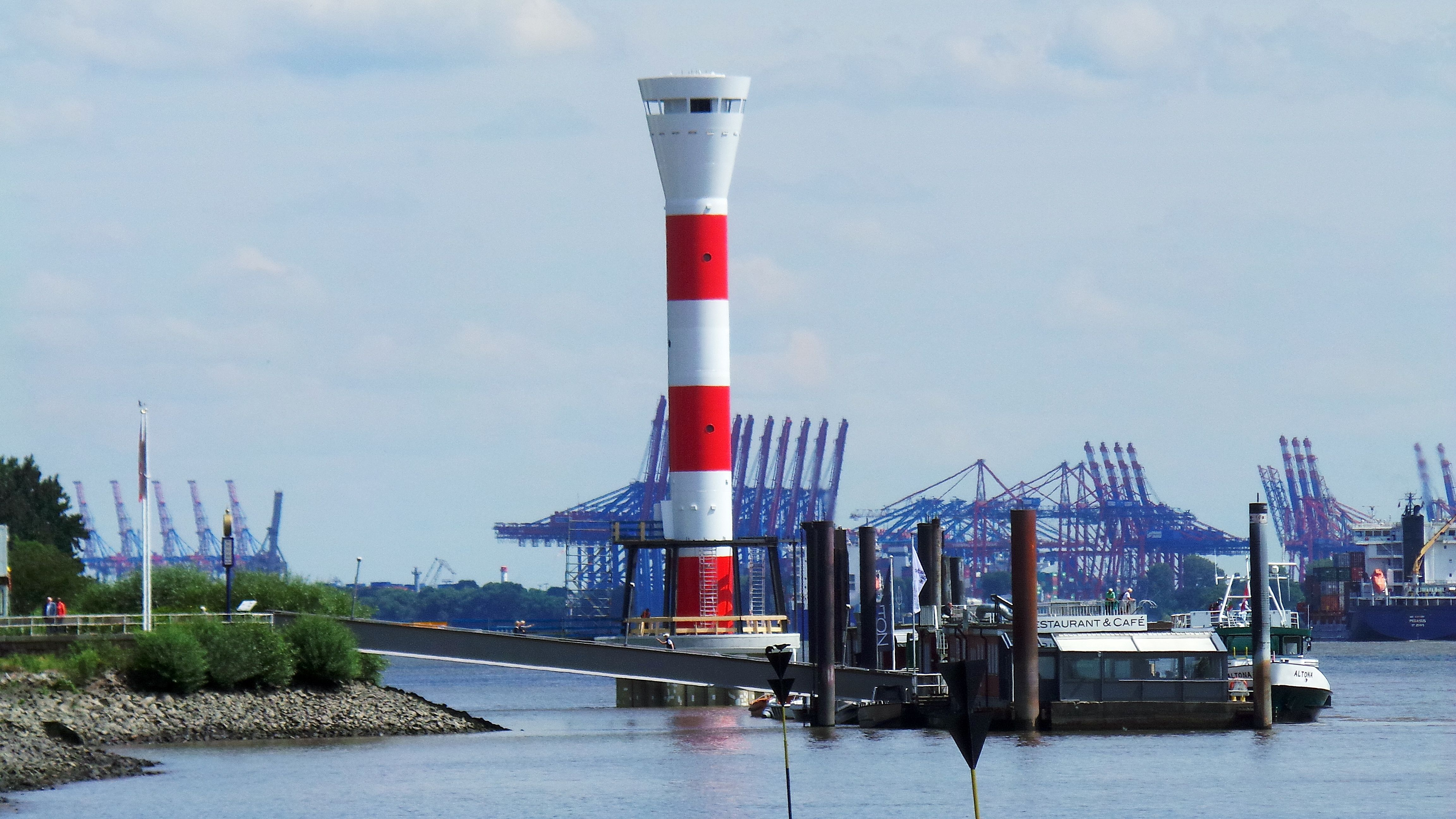
- Lighthouse
- Location: Blankenese, Hamburg
- Coordinates: 53.555465°N 9.807458°E

Tower
- Constructed: 2020
- Construction: Steel
- Height: 33 metres (108 ft)
- Shape: Cylinder tower, 2 Signals lamps
- Markings: White and Red

Light
- First lit: since 1. November 2020
- Focal height: 32 metres (105 ft), height of light
- Lens: electric
- Intensity: 13 Mcd
- Range: 8,410 metres (4.54 nmi)
- Characteristic: Glt. W 4s (Equal Light, White, 4 Seconds)

Blankenese Low Lighthouse is a lighthouse on the river Elbe, located in the Hamburg district of Blankenese. The previous one entered into service in 1984 and was demolished in November 2020, but replaced by a similar some 200 m river upwards. Blankenese Low Lighthouse and Blankenese High Lighthouse form a range of lights for ships sailing upriver on the Elbe. With a range of 8.4 Kilometres, they have the longest range on the lower Elbe river.

== Description ==
It is made of steel and stands 33 meters tall. The column is striped in red and white with a white steel lantern house at the top with some portholes. It is positioned approximately 30 meter offshore in the river Elbe and some 100 m to the Pier. On the base of the tower is a 7.5 m high level staircase deck. Inside it has a helix staircase going to the top. At the higher podium floor is a door entrance of the structure.

The lighthouse is remotely controlled by the Seemanshöft Pilot Centre and belongs to the Hamburg Port Authority.

Due to the offshore location of the lighthouse, a caisson was used to build the concrete foundation to a depth of 10 meters below the water surface. The lantern house was assembled with the help of a floating crane.

=== Replacement ===
Due to adjustments to the Elbe fairway, both the High and the Low Lighthouses replaced older ones which were demolished. The Demolition was made by Company Taucher Knoth starting on 5 November 2020 and finishing prior 2021.

== See also ==
- List of lighthouses and lightvessels in Germany
