= Warnemünde Lighthouse =

Lighthouse in Mecklenburg-Western Pomerania, Germany

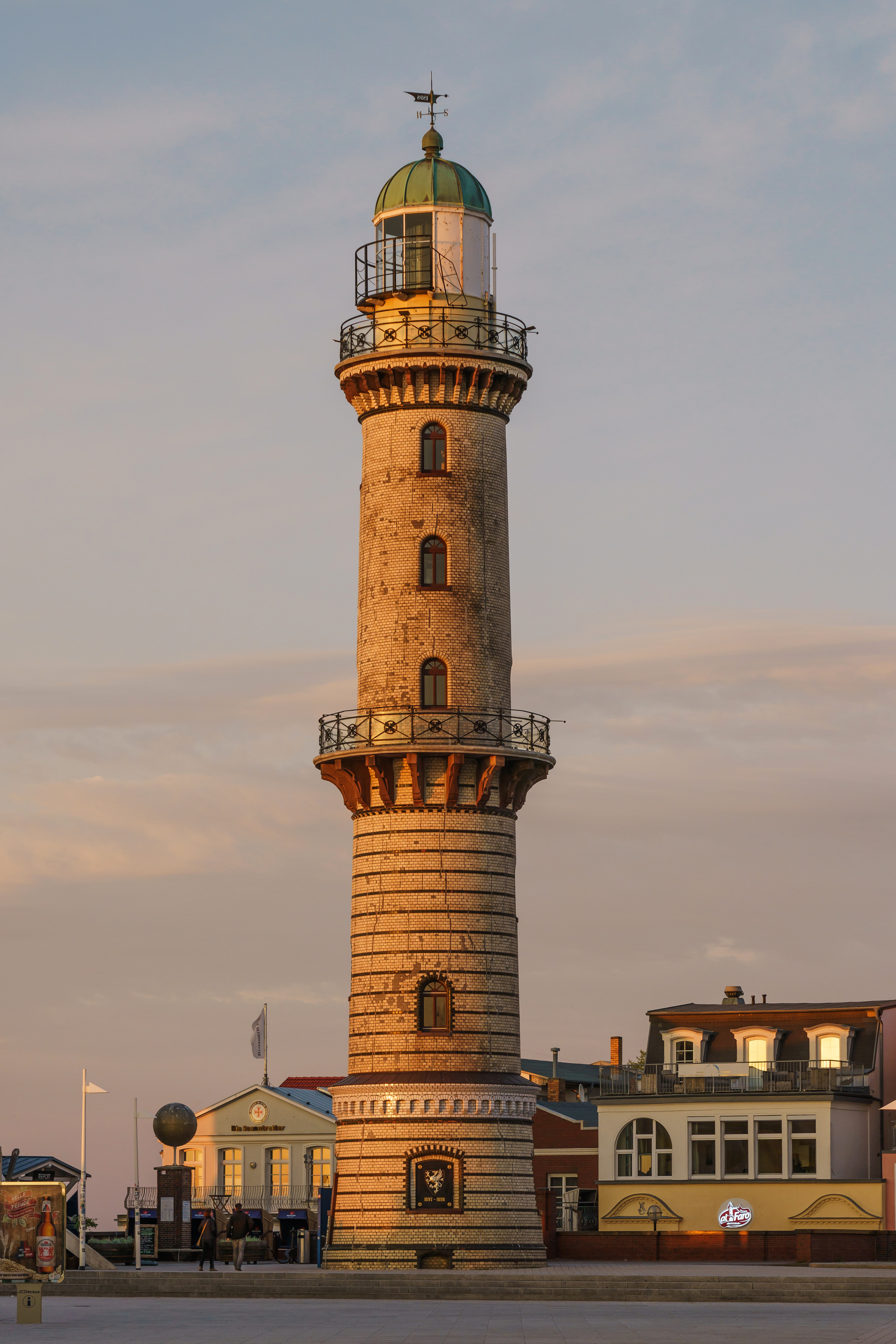
- Location: Warnemünde, Western Baltic Sea; Germany
- Coordinates: 54°10′53.1″N 12°05′08.8″E

Tower
- Constructed: 1836 (first)
- Foundation: 33 pillars
- Construction: glazed white brick
- Automated: 1978
- Height: 36.9 metres (121 ft)
- Shape: tapered cylindrical tower with lantern and two galleries
- Markings: unpainted tower, green copper lantern dome
- Operator: Förderverein Leuchtturm Warnemünde
- Heritage: architectural heritage monument in Mecklenburg-Vorpommern

Light
- First lit: 1898 (current)
- Focal height: 34 metres (112 ft)
- Lens: Fresnel lens
- Range: 20 nautical miles (37 km)
- Characteristic: Fl (3+1) W 24s.

Warnemünde Lighthouse is a lighthouse situated on the Unterwarnow, the estuary of the Warnow river, in Warnemünde, a district in the city of Rostock. The lighthouse has a height of 36.9 metres (121 ft) and was put into service in 1898.

== Planning ==
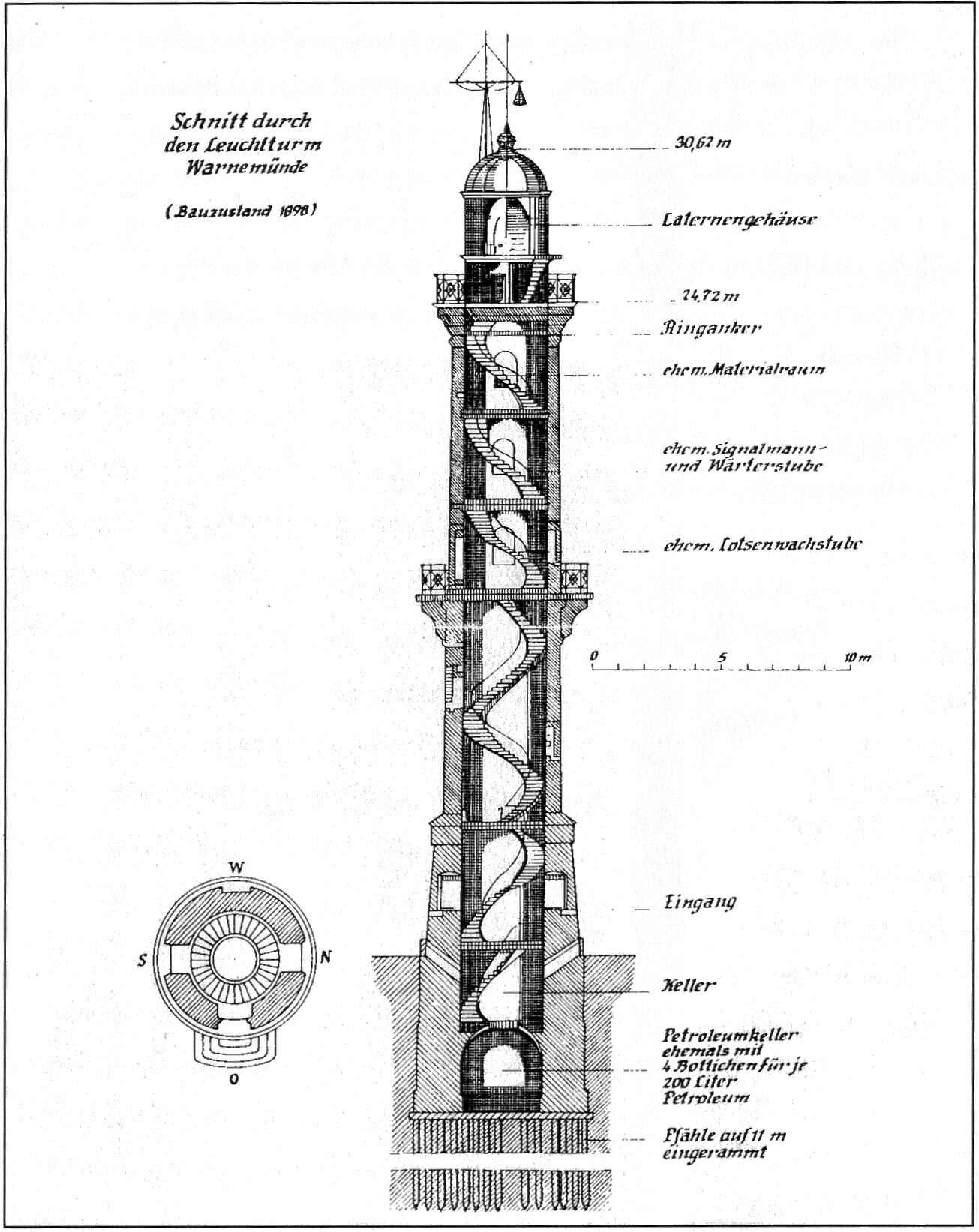
Sketch of the lighthouse

In 1862 it was decided to replace the old 8-metre-high storm lamp in Warnemünde with a new lighthouse. The construction of the lighthouse was officially approved in 1863, however, as a result of serious disagreement between its financiers, the town of Rostock, the district administrator (estates of the country: parliament of patricians and knights) and the Mecklenburg railways (the latter had owned the ferry boat route to Gedser in Denmark since 1886), the project did not actually start until 1897. It was commissioned one year later in October 1898. The building was planned and erected by the director of harbour construction, Friedrich Kerner.

== Construction ==
33 posts were piled 11 metres deep into the earth to act as the foundation. The lighthouse has two cellars and the part above ground is 31 metres high and built of glazed white brick and a number of bands of green brick. The tower has two galleries used as panoramic viewing platforms for visitors.

In the early years, the lighthouse lamp used petroleum and later gas to generate its light. To begin with, the rotating Fresnel lens assembly was propelled by clockwork, driven by a heavy iron weight sliding down a steel tube in the centre of the tower. Every evening, the lighthouse keeper had first to pump 90 litres of petroleum up to a tank at the top and then wind the weight up every two hours. Since 1927 it has operated electrically. The beam has an angle of over 180° and is focused by mirror reflectors on the land side. The light can be seen at a distance of about 20 nautical miles (37 km).

The light characteristic or light pattern, which enables the identification of the lighthouse, is: 0,3 fl. -2,7 dark -0,3 fl. -2,7 dark -0,3 fl. -8,7 dark -0,3 fl. -8,7 dark. Each sequence lasts 24 seconds.

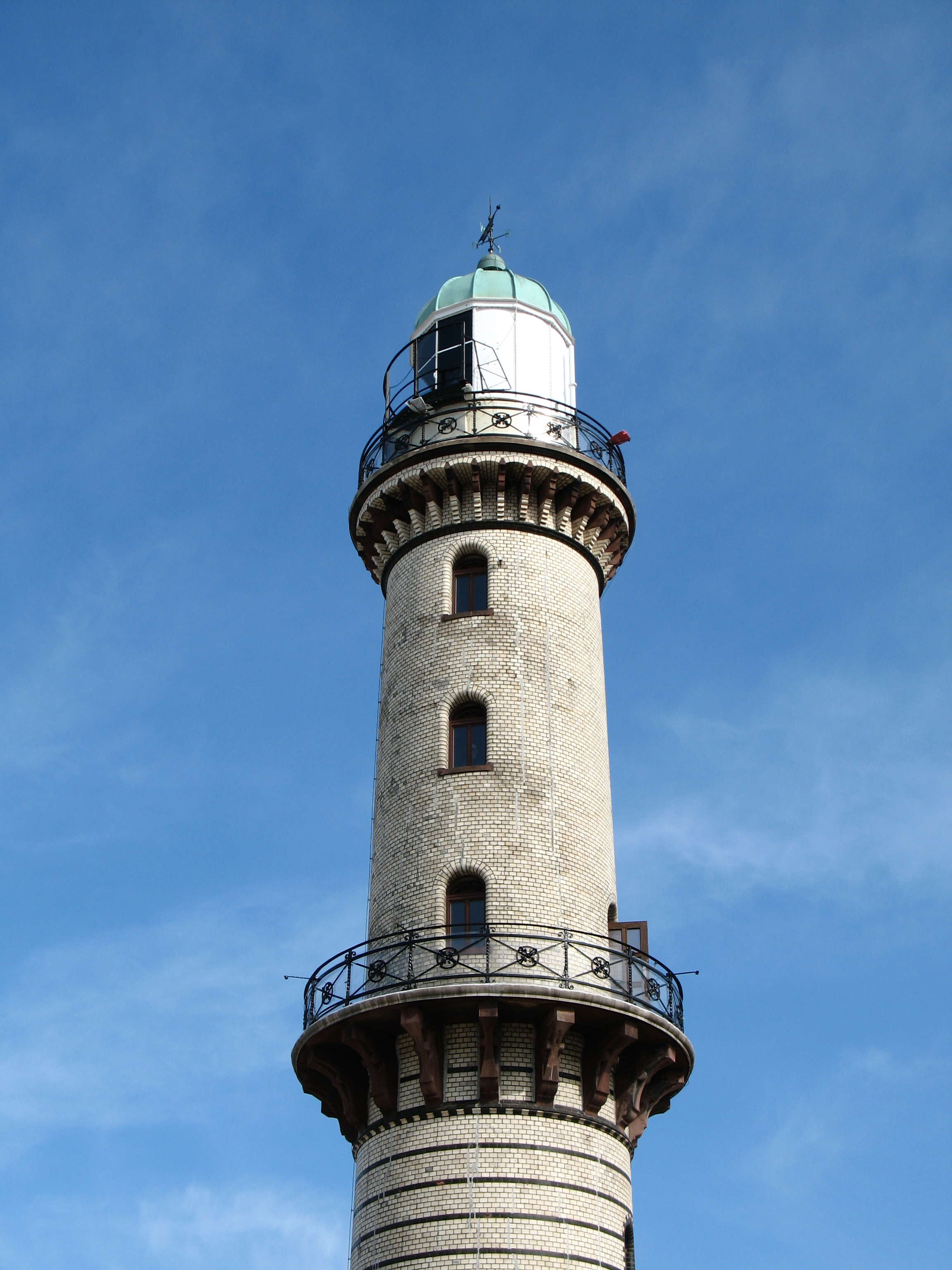
Warnemünde Lighthouse

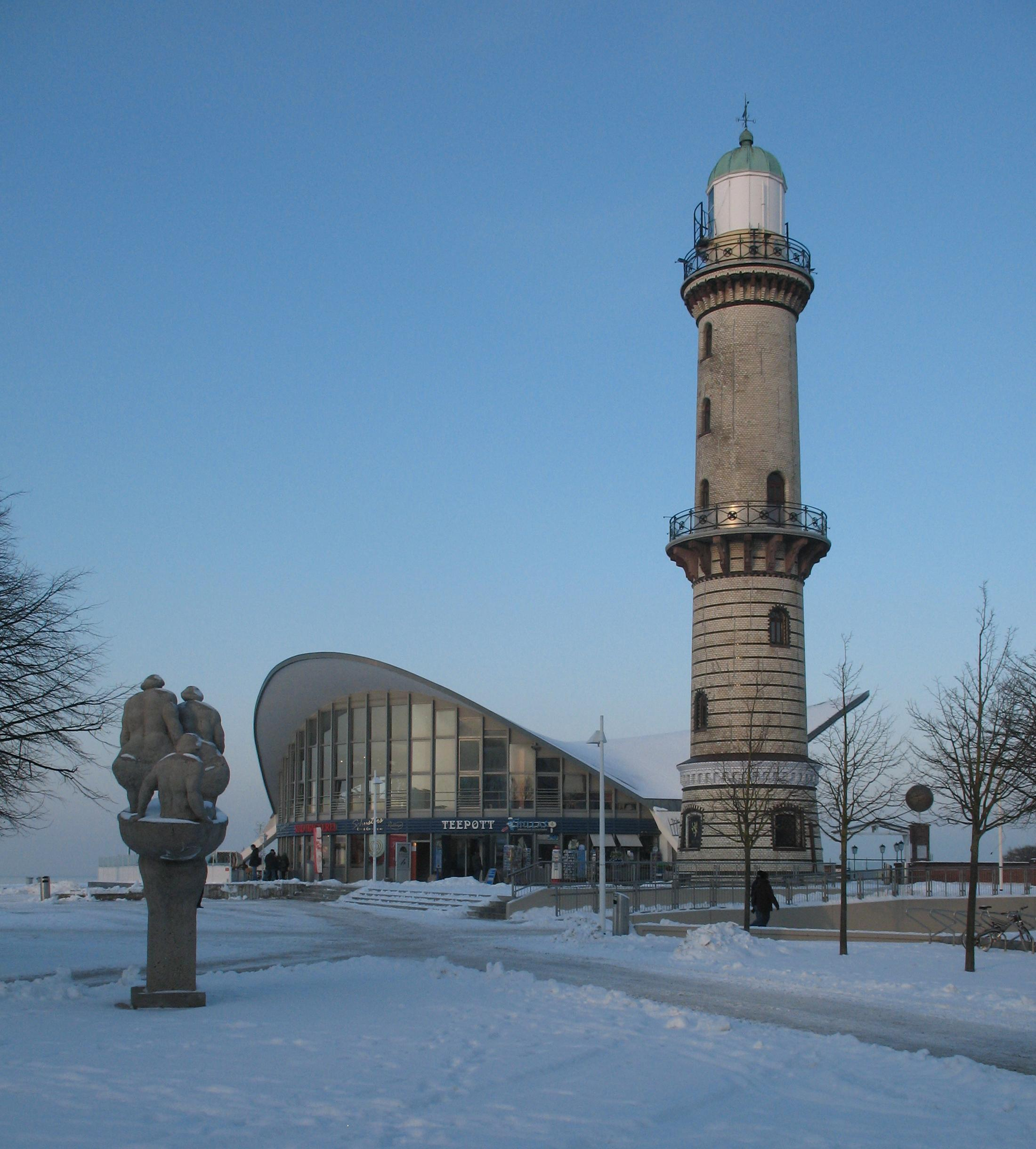
Warnemünde Lighthouse

The lighthouse can be climbed by a granite spiral staircase. Until 1978 the lighthouse was run by a lighthouse keeper. Now the service has been centralized and is managed by the Sea Traffic Control Centre at Hohe Düne.

In the 1960s, the walls of the lighthouse started to show cracks. So in 1969, restoration started, a process that was not completed until 1993. Since then the lighthouse has been open again for visitors to climb to the top, something which is important nowadays for tourism.

The lighthouse has a very active support group – the Warnemünder Lighthouse Society (Warnemünder Leuchtturmverein) based in Warnemünde. Most of its members act as voluntary guides for tourists.

== Events ==
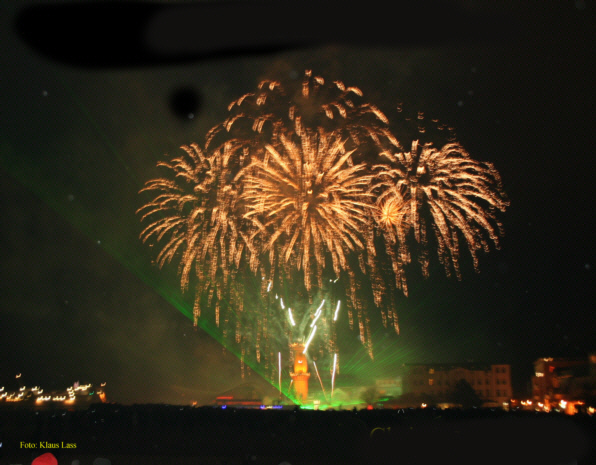
The lighthouse "in flames"

Each year a large lighthouse show with laser light and music is celebrated on New Year's Day. The event is called "Lighthouse in Flames", and attracts around 10,000 people.

== In popular culture ==
The official promotional poster for the 2010 film Shutter Island shows a lighthouse very similar to Warnemünde lighthouse in form and proportion, which also has two galleries. This has led to speculation that an image of the Warnemünde lighthouse was used for the advertisement.

== See also ==
- List of lighthouses in Germany
