= Blankenese High Lighthouse =

Lighthouse in Hamburg, Germany

Blankenese High Lighthouse Blankenese Oberfeuer
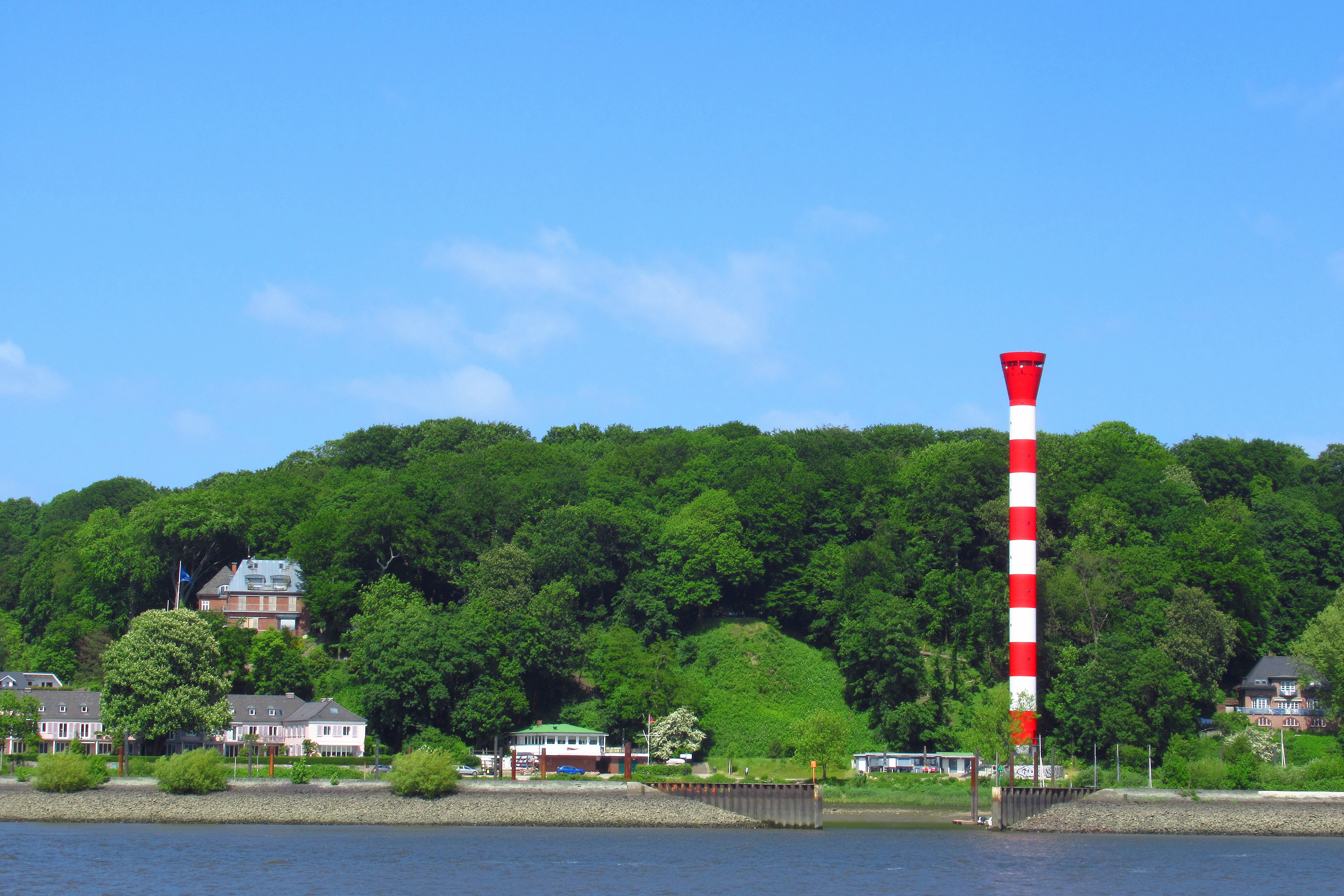
- Location: Blankenese, Hamburg
- Coordinates: 53°33′21.5″N 09°48′58.6″E

Tower
- Constructed: 1984
- Construction: reinforced concrete
- Height: 40 metres (130 ft), height of light 39 metres (128 ft)
- Shape: cylindrical tower with inverted conical at the summit
- Markings: white tower with two horizontal red bands, red summit
- Power source: mains electricity
- Operator: WSA Hamburg

Light
- Deactivated: 2020
- Focal height: 84 metres (276 ft)
- Lens: electric
- Intensity: 16 Mcd
- Range: 8,410 metres (4.54 nmi)
- Characteristic: white light 2s on, 2s off, synchronized with the front light

Blankenese High Lighthouse (also known as Blankenese Upper Lighthouse) was a lighthouse on the river Elbe in the Hamburg district of Blankenese, from 1984 to 2020.

== Description ==
Blankenese High Lighthouse and Blankenese Low Lighthouse form a range of lights for ships sailing upriver on the Elbe. With a range of 8.4 kilometers, they have the longest range on the Unterelbe.

The Blankenese High Lighthouse was 40-meters tall, white-and-red-striped concrete tower with a red steel lantern house was constructed in 1983. It is located in Baurs Park on the Kanonenberg, approximately 1,340 meters from the low light. Inside it has a round staircase leading to the top. Because of its height, the tower has an obstacle lighting for air transport.

The eleven-ton lantern house was assembled using a mobile crane. The range of lights went operational on 29 November 1984.

The lighthouse was remotely controlled by the Seemanshöft Pilot Centre.

=== Replacement ===
Due to adjustments to the Elbe fairway, both the High and the Low Lighthouses were replaced to a similar 62.25 m high at Mühlenberg and demolished.

== See also ==
- List of lighthouses and lightvessels in Germany
