= Hohe Weg Lighthouse =

Lighthouse in Lower Saxony, Germany

Hohe Weg
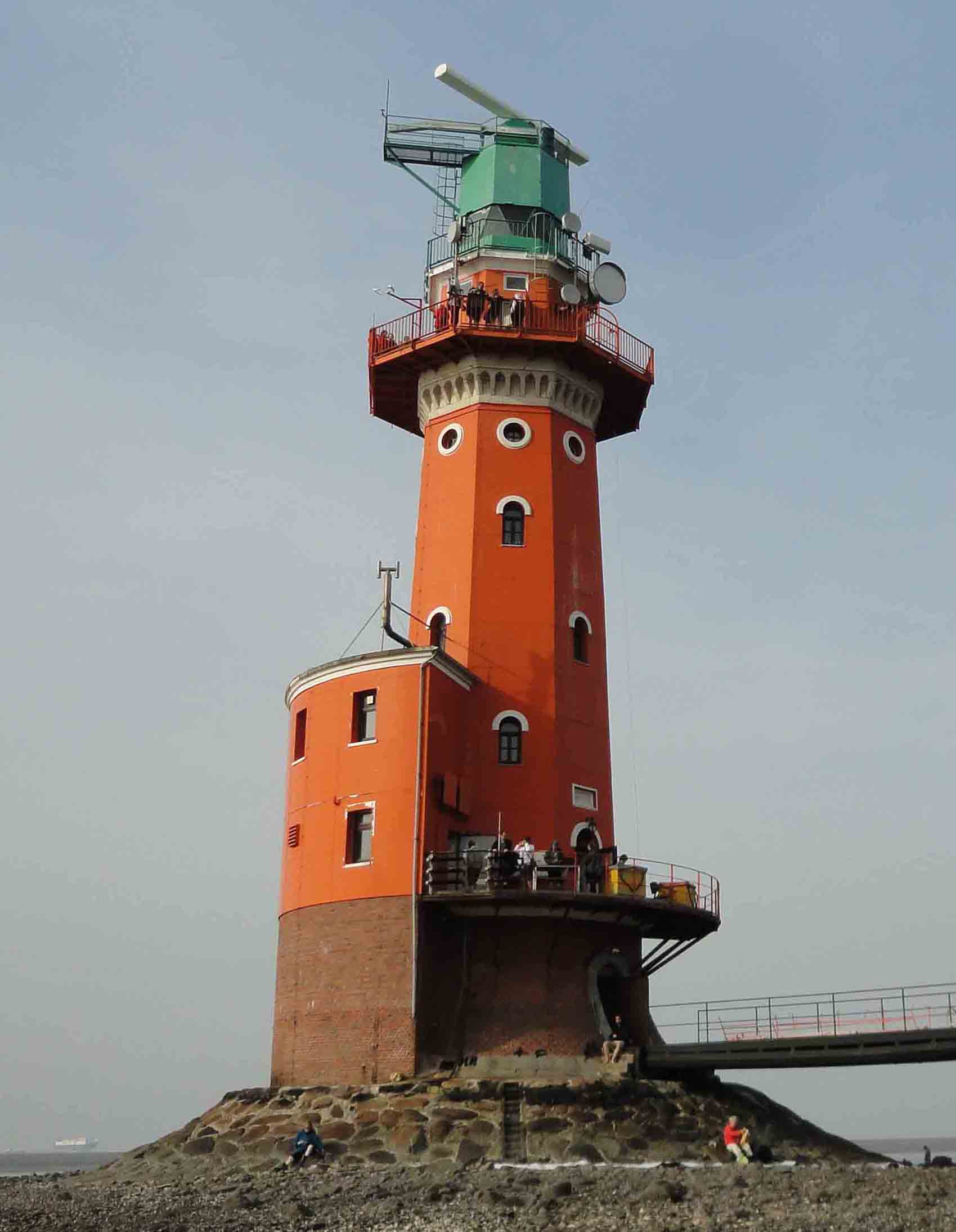
- Location: offshore, Weser estuary
- Coordinates: 53°42′44.44″N 8°14′35.68″E

Tower
- Constructed: 1856
- Construction: 1854–1856
- Automated: 1973
- Height: 36 m

Light
- First lit: 1856
- Focal height: 29 m (95 ft)
- Lens: Fresnel lens
- Intensity: 126,000 cd
- Range: 19.5 nmi (36.1 km; 22.4 mi) (white), 16.2 nmi (30.0 km; 18.6 mi) (red), 15 nmi (28 km; 17 mi) (green)
- Characteristic: F.WRG

Hohe Weg is an offshore lighthouse in the German Bight, located 25 km northwest of Bremerhaven, Germany. It is the oldest fixed offshore lighthouse of the Weser estuary in the Wadden Sea, having been in operation since 1856.

== Location ==
The lighthouse is located on the sandbank of the same name on the left bank of the outer Weser. It is 3 km south of the island Mellum and about 20 km north of the mainland. At high tide, the lighthouse is fully surrounded by water. At low tide, the sandbank emerges which it is part of.

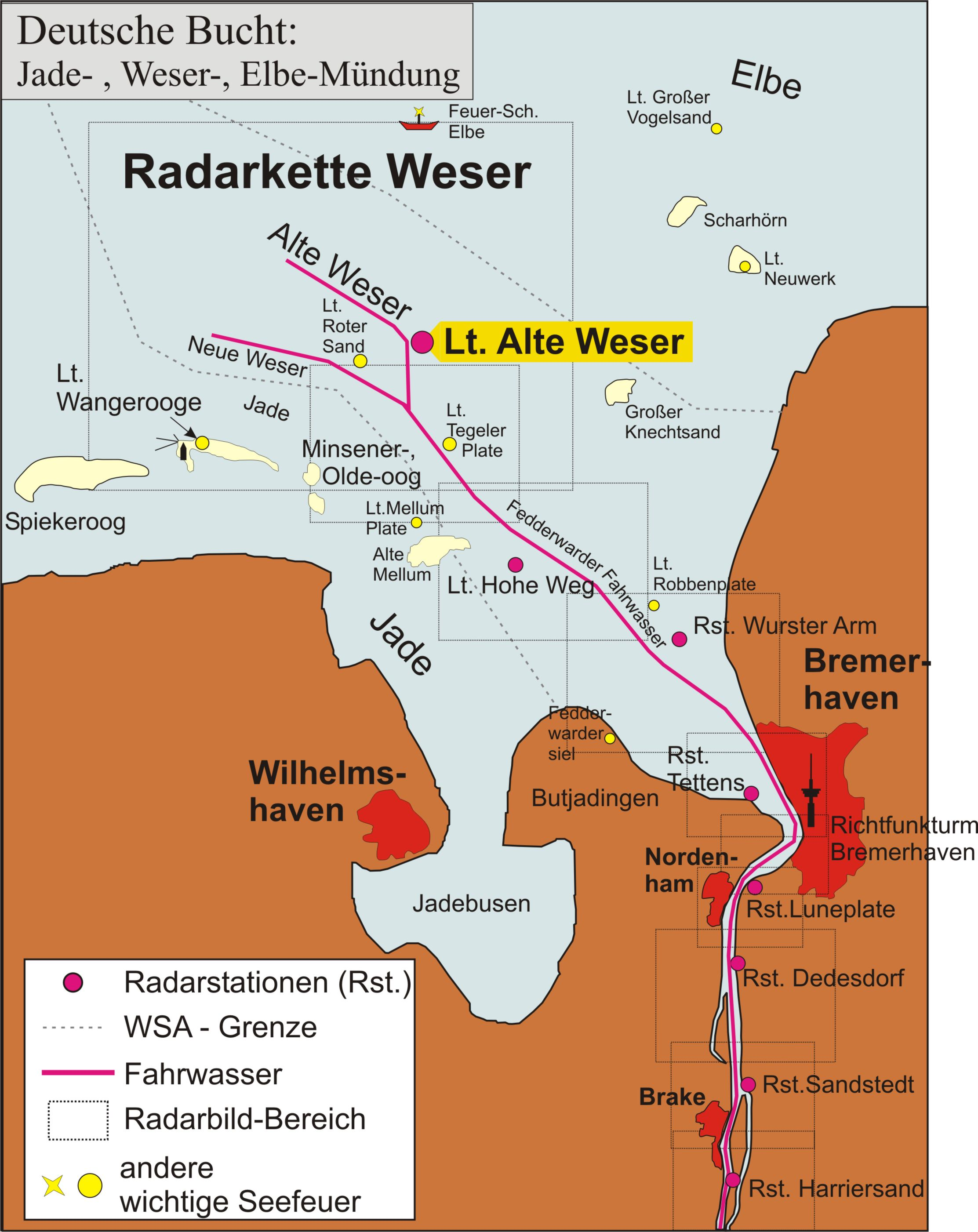
Location as part of the radar chain Weser

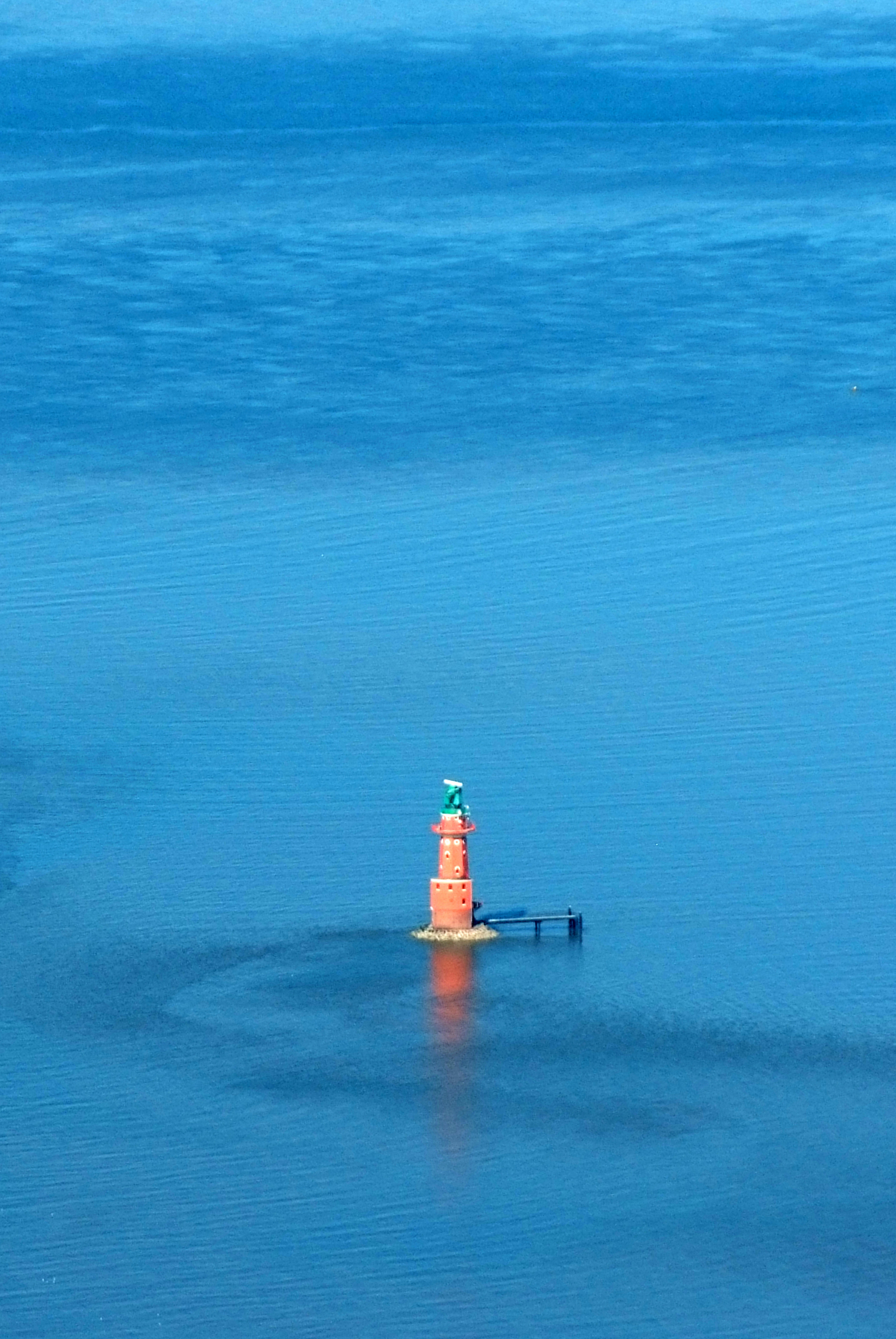
Lighthouse and the sandbank

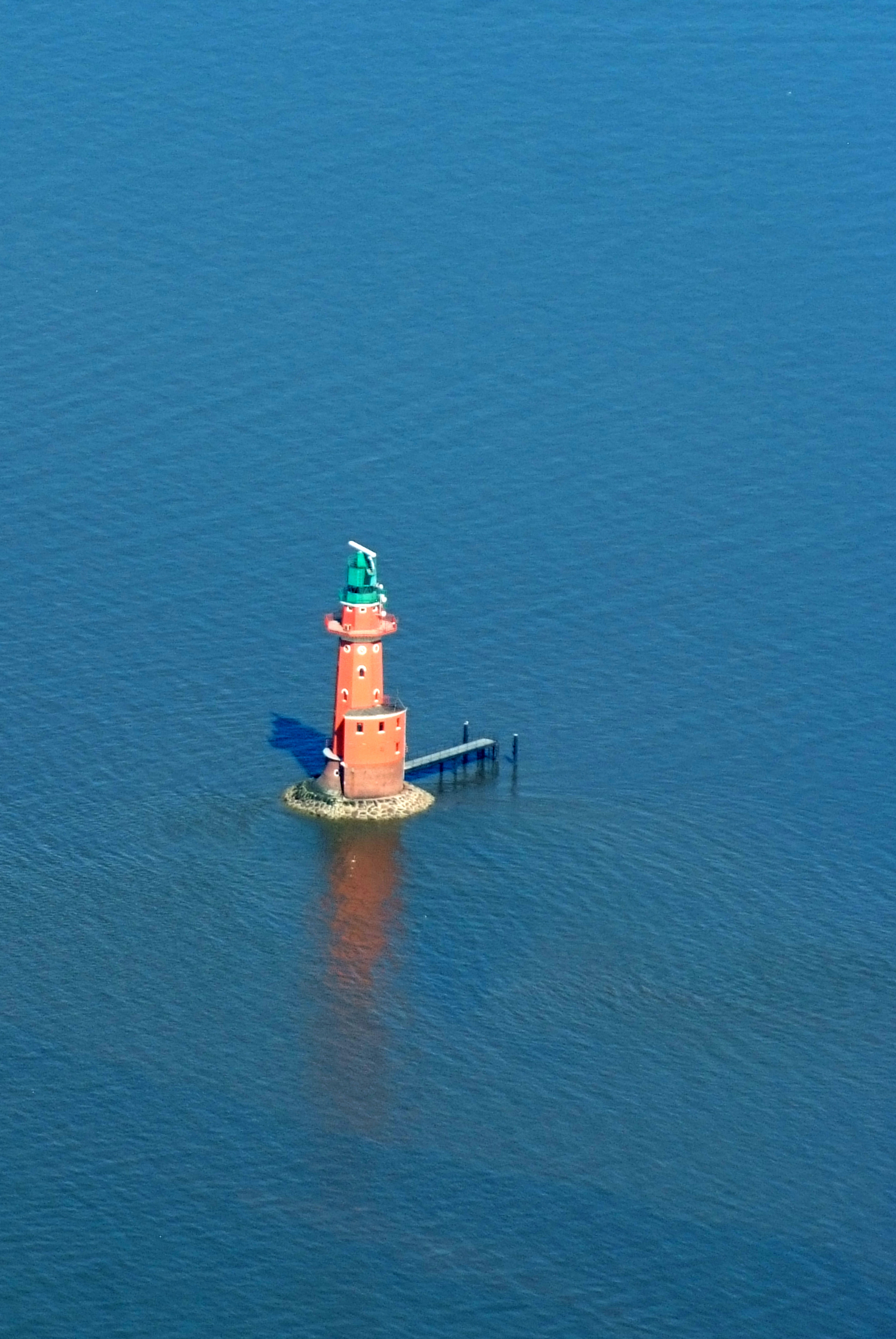
Aerial view

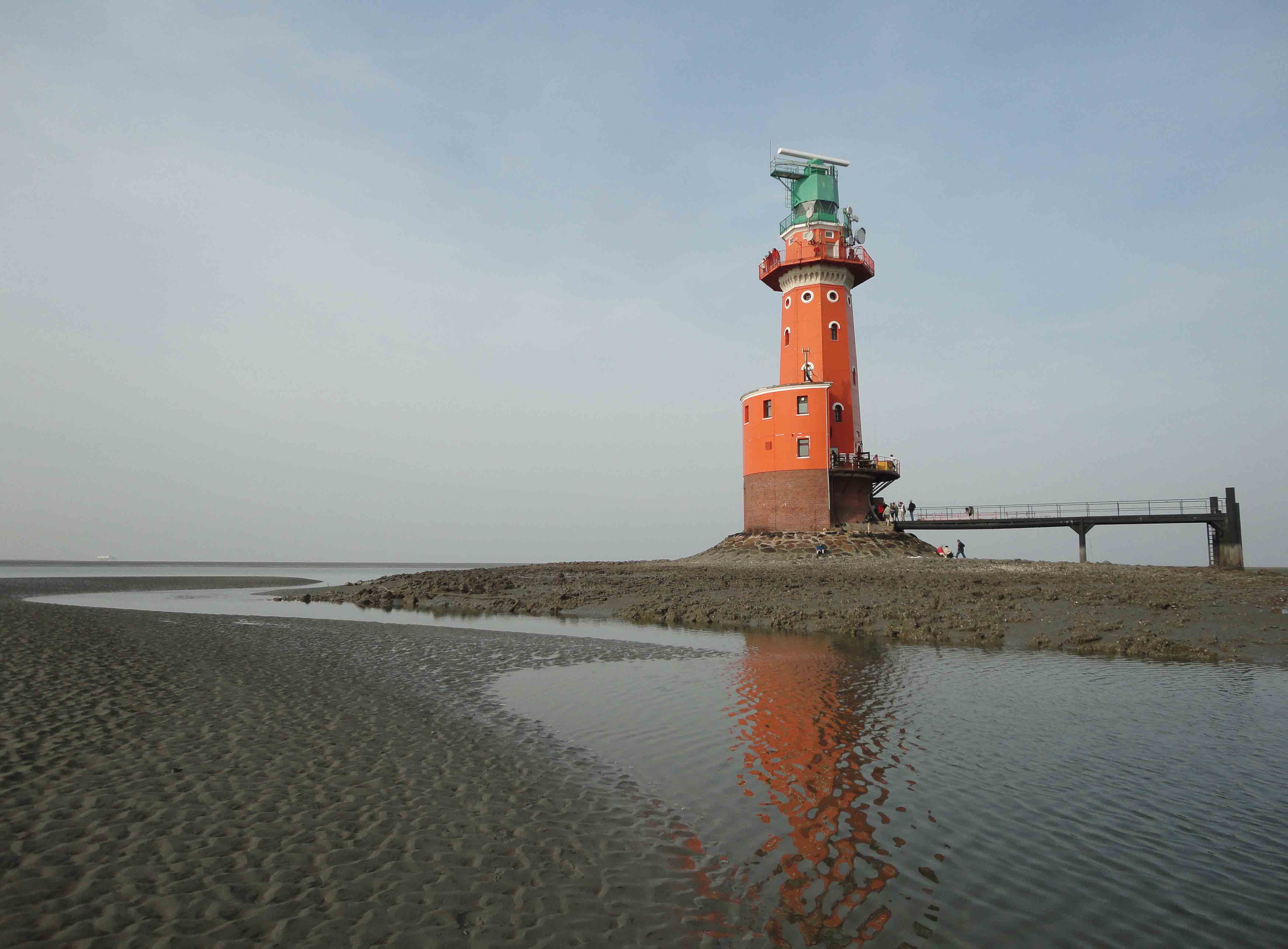
Lighthouse at low tide

== History ==
Coastal maps from 1757 indicate the existence of a shipping signal at the location of today's lighthouse. In 1783 a wooden structure, the Bremer Bake, was built. Due to the increasing shipping traffic to the Weser, initial consultations started in 1824 to explore the construction of a fixed offshore lighthouse. Work started in 1854 and was completed in 1856. The offshore location posed a challenge and work was only possible during low tide when the sandbank was exposed.

In order to optimize the safety, the lighthouse saw further upgrades between 1960 and 1961 with the installation of a radar system, directional radio antennas and a new casing for the light. In 1973 operation was fully automated and the lighthouse keeper withdrawn.

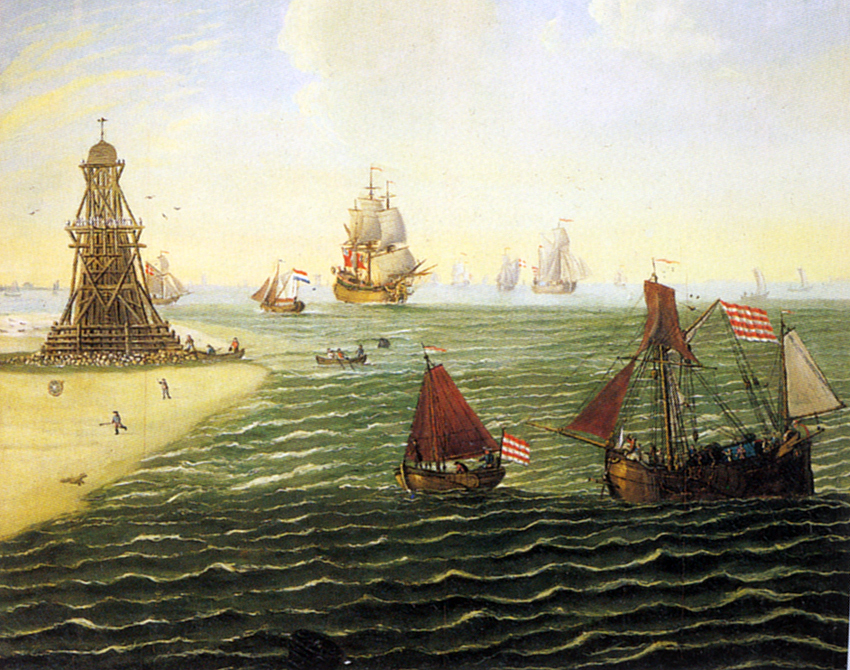
Historical painting of Bremer Bake and sandbank Hohe Weg (1790)

== Trivia ==
In 2006, the German post office issued a special 55ct stamp to commemorate its 150th anniversary.

The lighthouse contains some space that can be used as an emergency shelter by hikers in the Wadden Sea in case of a rising tide.

== See also ==
- List of lighthouses and lightvessels in Germany
