= Cape Arkona Lighthouses =

Lighthouse in Mecklenburg-Vorpommern, Germany

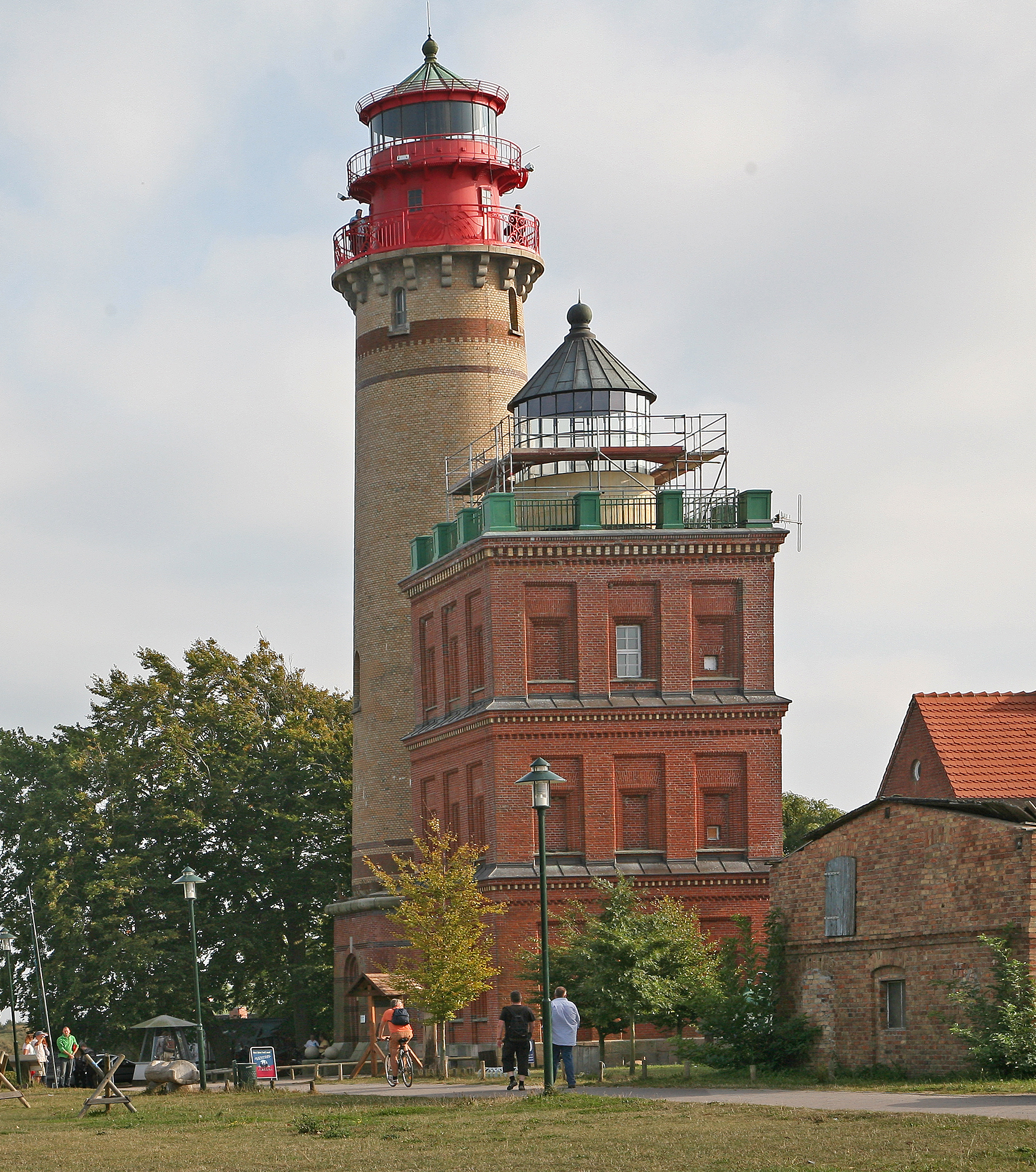
- Location: Putgarten, Germany
- Coordinates: 54°40′47″N 13°25′57″E
- Constructed: 1827, 1902
- Original lighthouse
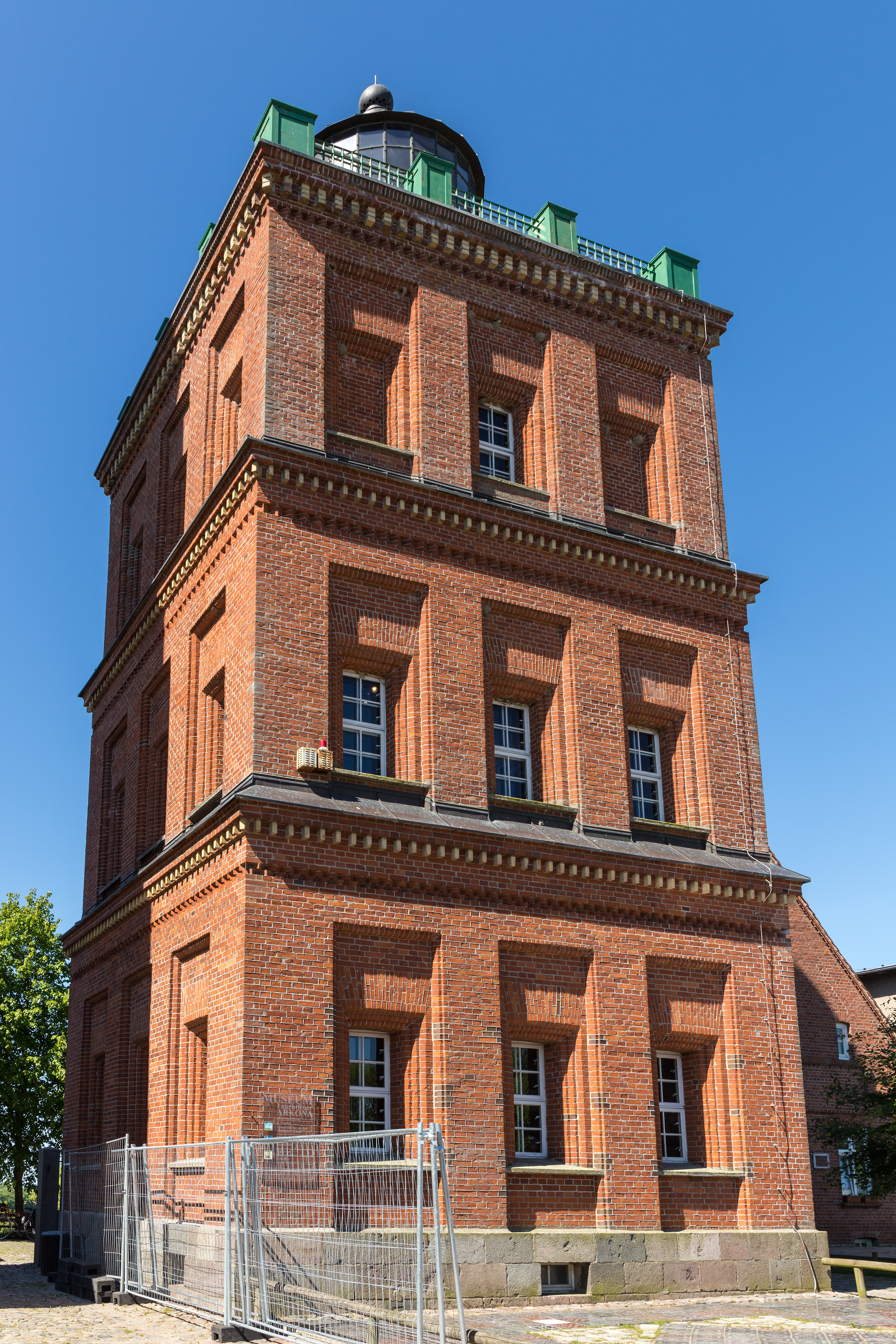
- Constructed: 1827
- Construction: brick (tower)
- Height: 21 m (69 ft)
- Shape: square tower with balcony and lantern
- Markings: Unpainted (tower), black (roof)
- Operator: Schinkelturm am Kap Arkona
- First lit: 1 January 1828
- Deactivated: 1902
- Focal height: 63 m (207 ft)
- Active light
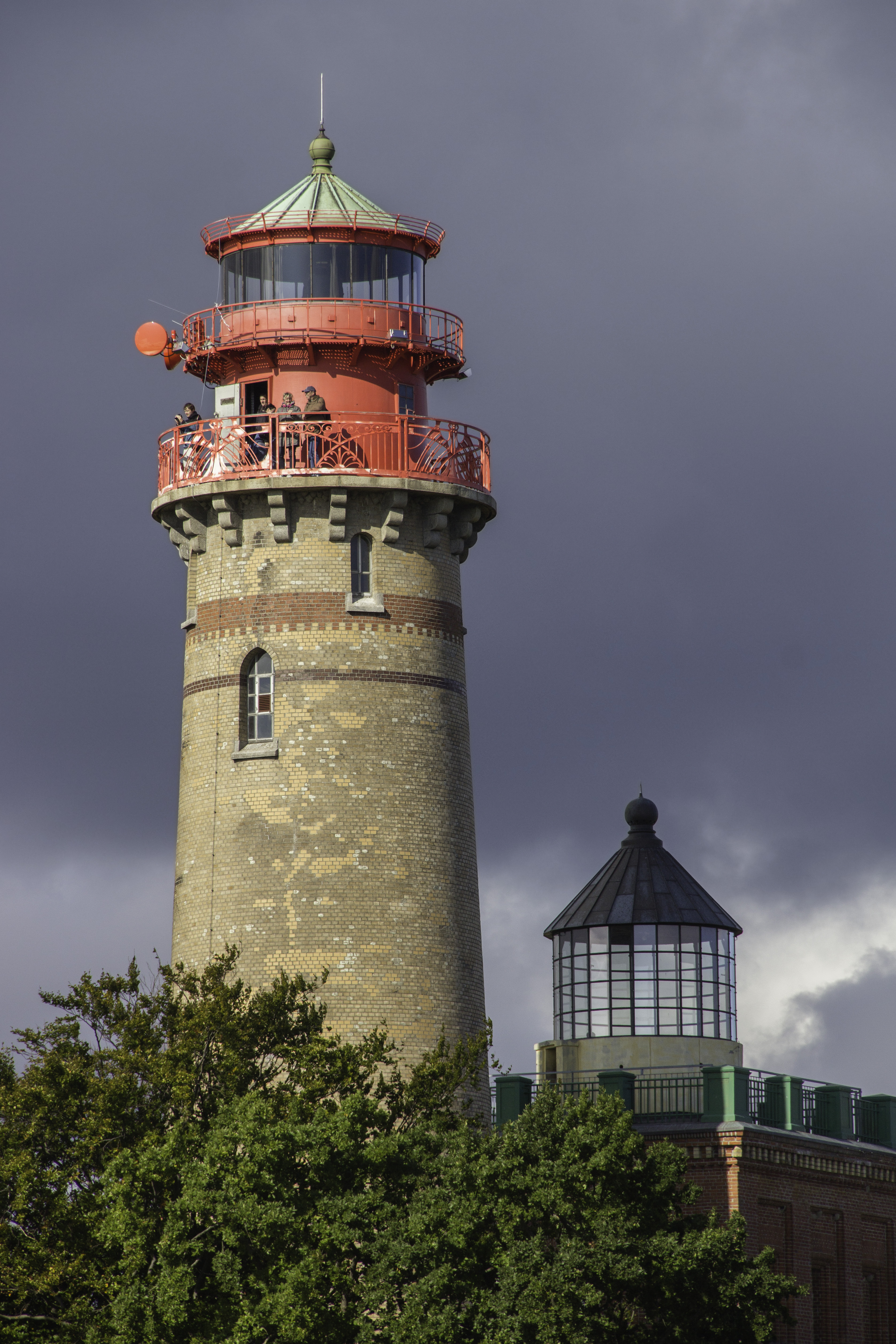
- Constructed: 1902
- Construction: brick (tower), granite (basement)
- Height: 35 m (115 ft)
- Shape: cylindrical tower, rising from an octagonal prism base, with double balcony and lantern
- Markings: Unpainted (tower), red (lantern), red (balcony)
- Operator: WSA Stralsund
- Heritage: architectural heritage monument in Mecklenburg-Vorpommern
- First lit: 1 April 1905
- Focal height: 75 m (246 ft)
- Lens: Fresnel lens
- Intensity: 550,000 candela
- Range: 22 nmi (41 km; 25 mi)
- Characteristic: Fl(3) W 17s

The Cape Arkona Lighthouse (German: Leuchtturm Kap Arkona) comprises two lighthouses and a radio navigation tower on the German Baltic Sea coast in Mecklenburg-Vorpommern, with the international serial number C 1062. It is located on Cape Arkona on the peninsula of Wittow on the northern tip of the island of Rügen.

All three towers were renovated in the early 1990s and are open to visitors. In the old lighthouse is a museum with an exhibition on lighthouses and maritime rescue as well as an outstation of the local registry office. Here marriages may be commemorated on a small plaque in front of the tower. The radio navigation tower (German: Peilturm) is used as an art museum and studio. On each tower is an observation platform, from where there are unimpeded views over the island of Rügen, especially the Wittow Peninsula. In fine weather, the Danish island of Møn may be made out.

== Schinkel Tower ==
The smaller of the two lighthouses was built of brick in 1826/27, to plans by the Prussian Main Construction Agency (Oberbaudeputation). The design is usually attributed to Karl Friedrich Schinkel, based mainly on a catalogue of drawings produced in 1863 by Schinkel's son-in-law, Alfred von Wolzogen.

Schinkel was not mentioned, however, in a document published in 1828 on the "Construction Designs of the Prussian State", in which town planner, August Adolph Günther, cites the lighthouse as a "design by the Royal Main Construction Agency." Signatures on two drawings of the lighthouse were, on the one hand, interpreted as evidence of Schinkel's authorship and, on the other, as no more than a simple administrative internal check note. No statements are known by Schinkel himself, who first viewed the tower in 1835, of his own participation in the construction of the tower. On the other hand, a contemporary, the Berliner engraver Johann Friedrich Rosmäsler, in his 1834 book, Preußen in landschaftlichen Darstellungen ("Prussia in Pictures") calls Schinkel the originator of the design. Rosmäsler produced a steel engraving of the lighthouse (1835).

The foundation stone was laid on 5 May 1826 and the light was lit on 10 December 1827. The tower is 19.3 metres (63 ft) high and has a focal height of 66 m above sea level (NN). Its light was visible out to 8 nautical miles (15 km; 9.2 mi).

The lighting apparatus was made by master goldsmith Hossauaer from Berlin. It consisted of 17 silver-plated, copper, parabolic mirrors, at the focal points of which were burners, each with its own oil tank of rapeseed oil. The associated mirrors were placed in metal rings in two staggered rows. In 1872, six additional lamps were installed, which ran on paraffin. A year later, the burners were completely converted to run on paraffin.

The rooms of the three-storey tower were used as working rooms and stores. It was also called the Schinkel Tower (Schinkelturm). On 1 April 1905, it was taken out of service. It is the second-oldest lighthouse on the Baltic Sea coast after the Travemünde Lighthouse.

The larger tower was built in 1901/02 immediately next to the old one and taken into service on 1 April 1905. It is 35 metres (115 ft) high and has a focal height of 75 m above NN. It is made of brick and stands on an octagonal granite base.

== New tower ==
On 27 June 1894, plans emerged for an electrically powered beacon by the firm Helios to replace the old tower. In 1902 this firm built and mounted the lighting apparatus. This consisted of two carbon arc lamps mounted on a rotating table. Each was surrounded on three sides by Fresnel lenses; on the fourth side a screen blocked the light. This light system existed until 1921 when two bulbs were installed as light sources. In 1995 the system was swapped for a metal-halide lamp with an intensity of 2,325 million candelas. Its electric flashing light sends three flashes every 17.1 seconds and is visible at up to 24 nautical miles (44 km; 28 mi). At the same time, one of the two triple-lens sets was removed and displayed to the public.

== Navigation tower ==
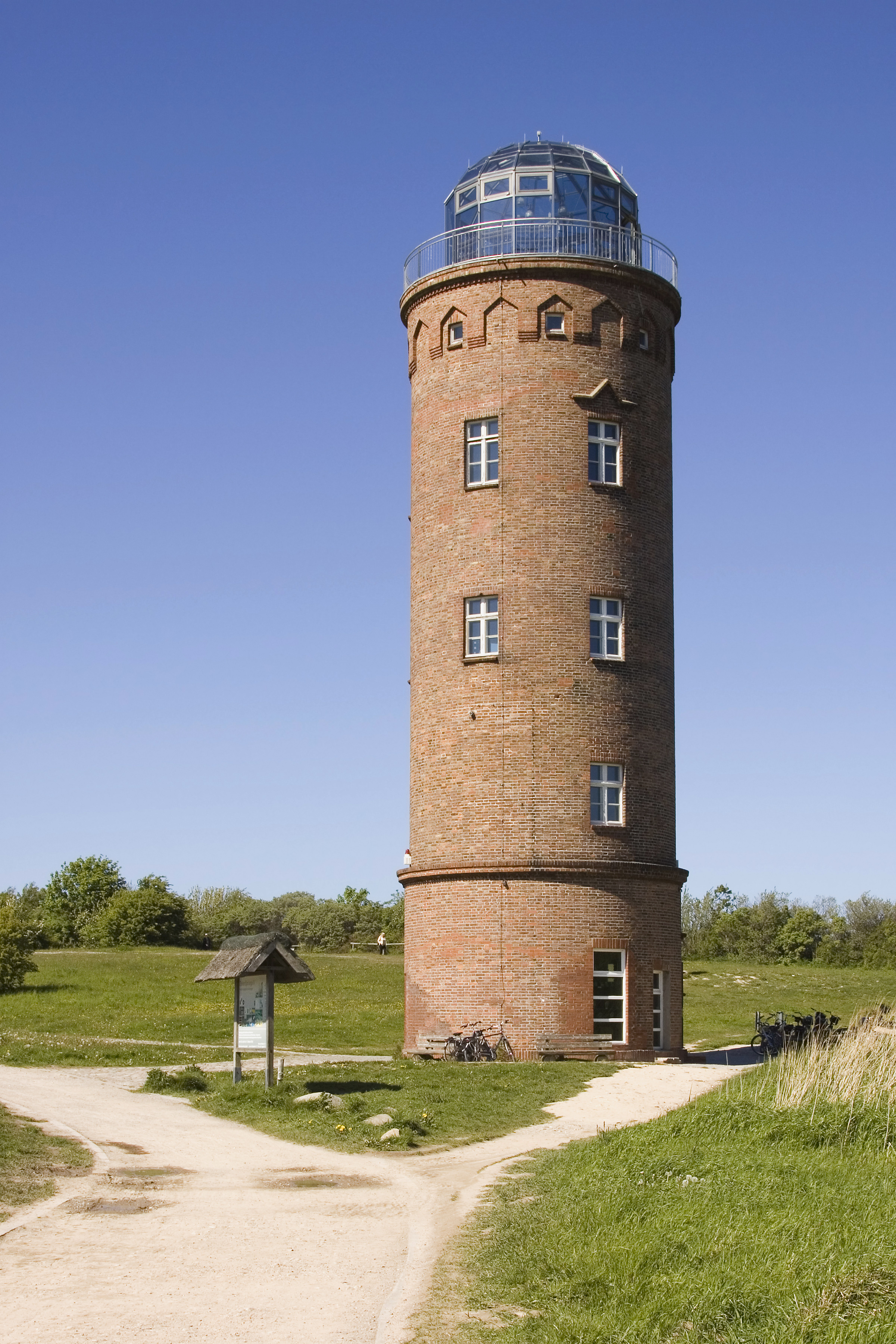
Navigation tower

The former marine navigation tower (German: Peilturm) was built in 1927 of brick and acted as a maritime navigation beacon. From 1911 to 1925, attempts were made – which were ground-breaking for that time – to improve navigation for the Sassnitz-Trelleborg railway ferry, established in 1909, using the emission of radio waves. To this end, large antenna fields were built within the ramparts of the medieval Jaromarsburg fortification. The foundations of the associated radio operating facility inside the ramparts have survived to this day. The technical facilities of the navigation tower were destroyed, however, in 1945.

Since 2003, the tower has housed the amber studio of Wiesbaden artist, Nils Peters.

== See also ==
- List of lighthouses and lightvessels in Germany
