= Roter Sand Lighthouse =

Lighthouse in Lower Saxony, Germany

- Location: Offshore, mouth of the Weser River; German Bight
- Coordinates: 53.855°N 8.079167°E

Tower
- Constructed: 1885
- Foundation: steel caisson basement
- Construction: cast iron
- Height: 28 metres (92 ft)
- Shape: tapered cylindrical tower with balcony and lantern
- Markings: tower with horizontal white and red bands, black basement, lantern and roof
- Operator: Förderverein Leuchtturm Roter Sand
- Heritage: kulturdenkmal

Light
- Deactivated: 1986
- Focal height: 24 metres (79 ft)

Roter Sand is a lighthouse in the North Sea, in the Weser estuary. It entered service in 1885. The light was deactivated in 1986 but the tower still serves as a day beacon. Roter Sand Lighthouse was the first building ever to be erected directly on the sea floor.

It became a symbol of technical progress in the German Empire and is still one of the most famous lighthouses in Germany. On 31 October 2010, it was awarded the title of Historical Landmark of Civil Engineering in Germany.

== Description ==
Including the foundation, Roter Sand Lighthouse is 52.5 metres (172 ft) tall. At low tide, it measures 30.7 metres (101 ft) above sea level. Its focal height is 24 metres (79 ft) above mean high tide, while the tower as such is 28 metres (92 ft) tall.

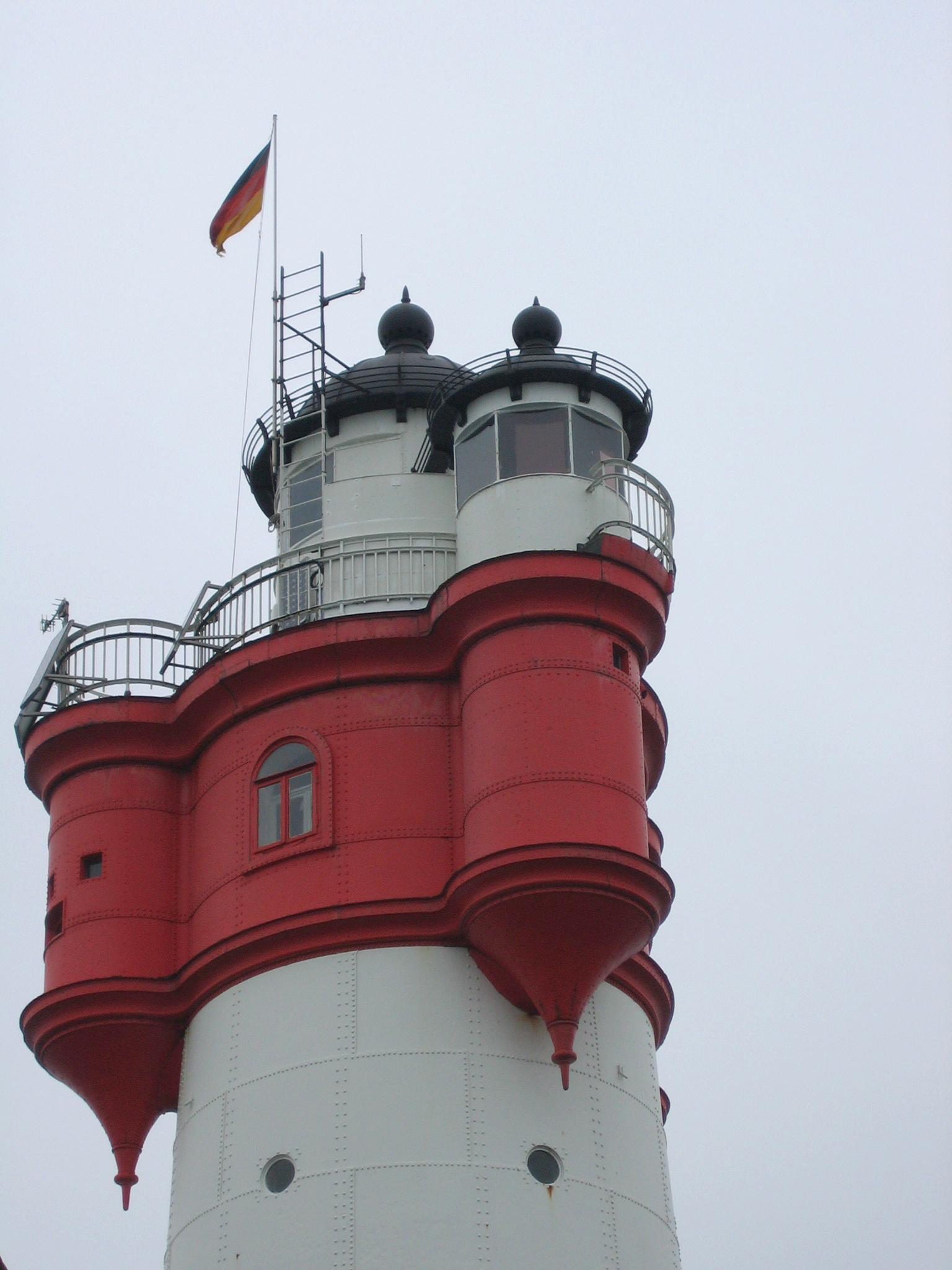
The three oriel windows of the tower. The hoisted flag shows that guests are staying in the lighthouse over night.

The foundation is cylindrical and protrudes 1.5 metres (4 ft 11 in) from the sea at low tide. The tower above is conical. It is painted with red and white bands above a black base. The order of colours is white-red-white-red-white whereby the coloured section also marks the five floors inside the tower. The entrance is located at the lower rim of the lowest white band.

The basement serves as a storage. A stairway leads from there to the sleeping room. Further up is the kitchen with a coal-heated oven, and a living and service room. The latter has three oriel windows, two of which have the same height as the room itself while the third one leads even higher. The oriels used to host minor lights and point towards North-west, South and North-east. From the service room, a balcony around the lantern can be reached via a stairway. However, it is not possible to walk all around the lantern because the higher oriel window blocks one part of the balcony.

During the 1940s, the rooms used to be different with the inside of the black sector being accessible as storage. At the entrance level, there used to be the equipment for the generation of electrical power.

== Tourism ==
Day trips to the lighthouse, from Bremerhaven via the vessel Lev Taifun, can be taken in June, July, and August. Staying overnight is also possible.

On 1 October 2010, the structure was awarded the title "Historical Monument of Engineering in Germany" (Historisches Wahrzeichen der Ingenieurbaukunst in Deutschland) by the Federal Chamber of Engineers.

== See also ==
- List of lighthouses in Germany
