= Westermarsch I =

- Stadtteil of Norden
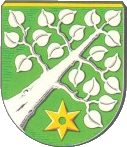
- Coat of arms

- Lage von Westermarsch I im Stadtgebiet von Norden
- Interactive map of Westermarsch I
- Location within Germany Location within Lower Saxony
- Coordinates: 53°34′27″N 07°09′08″E
- Country: Germany
- State: Lower Saxony
- Town: Norden

Area
  - Total: 19.424 km^{2} (7.500 sq mi)
- Elevation: 1 m (3.3 ft)

Population (2016-12-31)
  - Total: 442
  - Density: 22.8/km^{2} (58.9/sq mi)
- Time zone: UTC+01:00 (CET)
  - Summer (DST): UTC+02:00 (CEST)
- Postal codes: 26506
- Dialling codes: 04931

Westermarsch I was an independent municipality in Lower Saxony until the municipal reform of 1972 and, as such, a member of the collective municipality (Samtgemeinde) of Leybucht. Today Westermarsch I is a part of the East Frisian borough of Norden with about 450 inhabitants (as at 12/2016), spread over an area of 19.42 km².

== Name ==
The name Westermarsch I denotes the place as being in the west of the marshlands in the historical region of Norderland (see Ostermarsch). The Roman numeral in the name of the village distinguishes the former communal municipality (Kommunalgemeinde) from the neighbouring village of Westermarsch II.

== Structure, location and communication ==
As a marsh village, Westermarsch I is characterized by large-scale farming. Within the municipality there are not only isolated Gulf farmhouses, but there are several larger settlements. These include Mittelmarsch, Altendeich and Westermarscherloog.

Westermarsch I is bordered to the east by the town of Norden and to the north by Westermarsch II. The North Sea coast forms its natural boundary in the west and the watercourse of the Norder Tief as well as the Norden subdivision of Neuwesteel to the south.

The Landesstraße 27 connects Westermarsch I with the town of Norden and sea port of Greetsiel. Kreisstraße 214 runs from Westermarsch I to Norddeich.

== History ==
The construction of the Fokko Ukena Dyke began in 1425 as part of the dyking of the so-called Westermarsch Neulande ("new lands"). Until then, as everywhere else in the marshlands, people had built warfts to protect the inhabitants of the Neulande from the sea.

The most significant source about the history of the village is the Altendeich School Chronicle (Altendeicher Schulchronik), whose oldest sections date back to 1622 and which, in addition to the development of the school, also describe the history of the place. According to this source, a teacher was already being employed in 1622 to teach the children of farmers and householders. Further data and facts, which are listed in the chronicle, include:

- c. 1771, a large cattle epidemic raged in Westermarsch, which led to great economic hardship for the village's population of about 600
- A brickyard with a furnace capacity of some 20,000 bricks was erected on today's Kreisstraße 214 in 1774. It lasted until the 1970s. Three years later a sugar feeder was built.
- After a dyke burst in 1825, large parts of the village were devastated.
- The first regular transport link from Westermarsch to the town of Norden was built between 1873 and 1875. Before this link was built, both large and small various water courses were used as transport routes between the two towns due poor and unreliable road conditions.

On 1 July 1972 the municipality of Westermarsch I was incorporated into the borough of Norden.

== Religion and social ==
Well over 90% of the Westermarsch population belong to the Evangelical-Lutheran Church, St. Andrew's Church in Gottfried-Keller-Straße.

About 3% are members of the Evangelical free churches.

Around 1% are Roman Catholic.

There are no church buildings in Westermarsch I. The various church members have always been looked after by Norden. For several years church services were held in the village halls. A ladies group meets there regularly.

The AWO playschool meets next to the village hall in an old school.

An even older school, which became a nationally known bar after its closure, is today a victim of dilapidation.

== Literature and sources ==
- Karl Leiner: Panorama Landkreis Norden, Norden 1972, pp. 469ff.
