= Pilsum =

- Village of Krummhörn
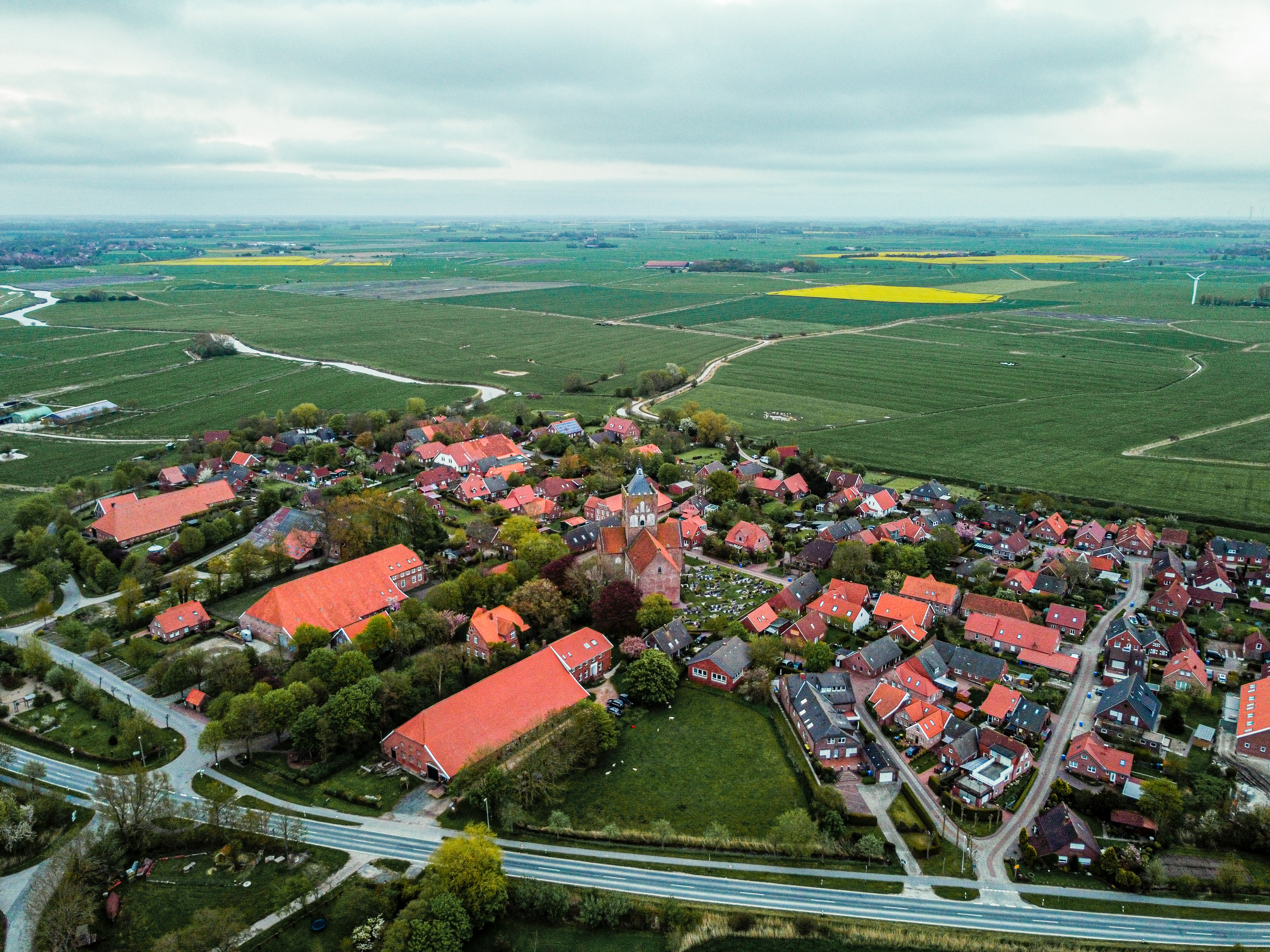
- Aerial view of Pilsum

- Coat of arms
- Interactive map of Pilsum
- Location within Germany Location within Lower Saxony
- Country: Germany
- State: Lower Saxony
- District: Aurich
- Municipality: Krummhörn

Area
  - Metro: 10.81 km^{2} (4.17 sq mi)
- Elevation: 5.5 m (18 ft)

Population
  - Metro: 537
- Time zone: UTC+01:00 (CET)
  - Summer (DST): UTC+02:00 (CEST)
- Postal codes: 26736
- Dialling codes: 04926

Pilsum is a village in the region of East Frisia, in Lower Saxony, Germany. It is part of the municipality of Krummhörn. The village is located between Manslagt and Greetsiel.

Pilsum was built on a warft. The original version of the current Church of Pilsum was built around 1240. To the northwest of Pilsum is the 11 metres high Pilsum Lighthouse, located on a dyke on the Wadden Sea.

== Gallery ==
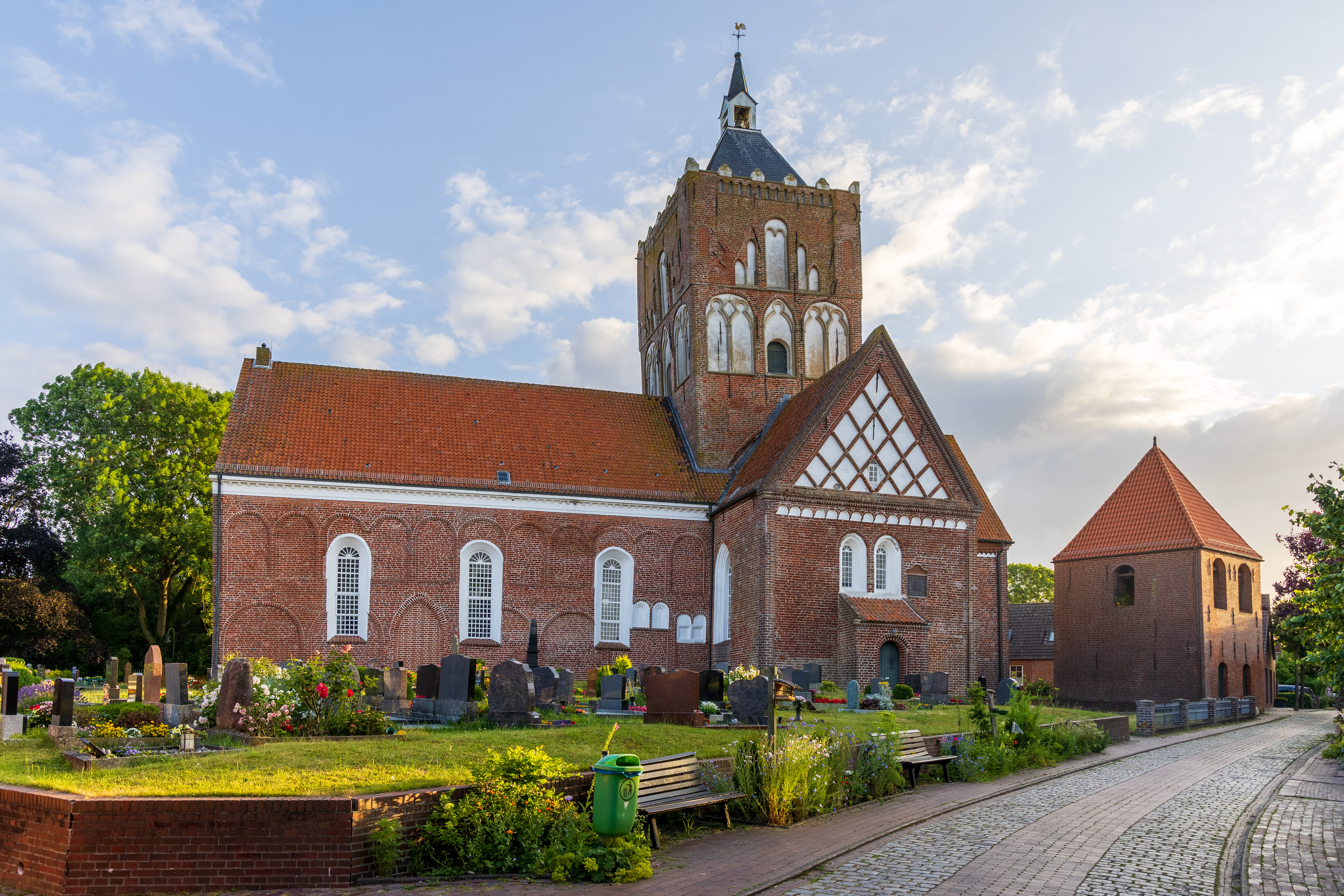
Church of Pilsum

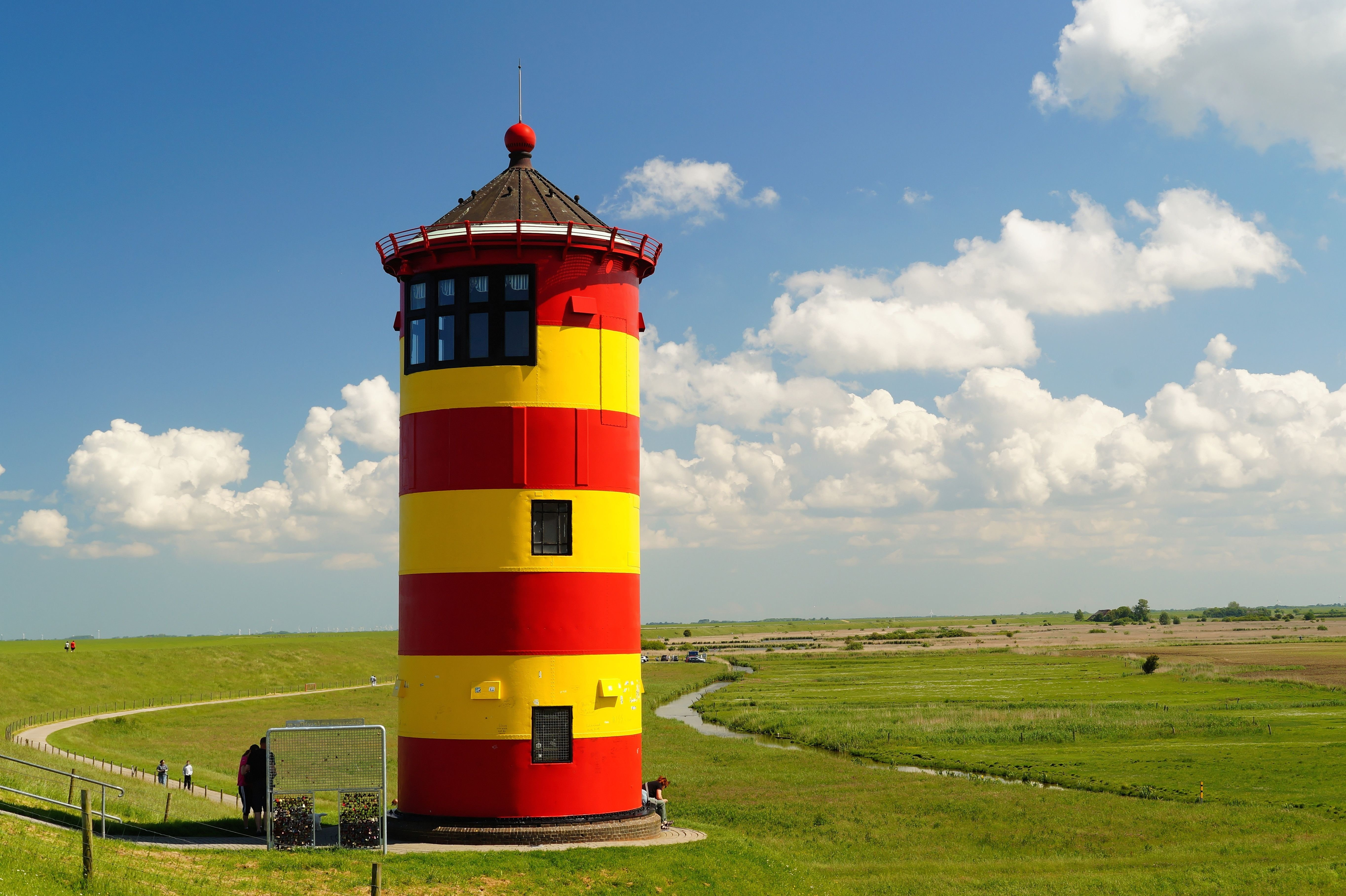
Pilsum Lighthouse

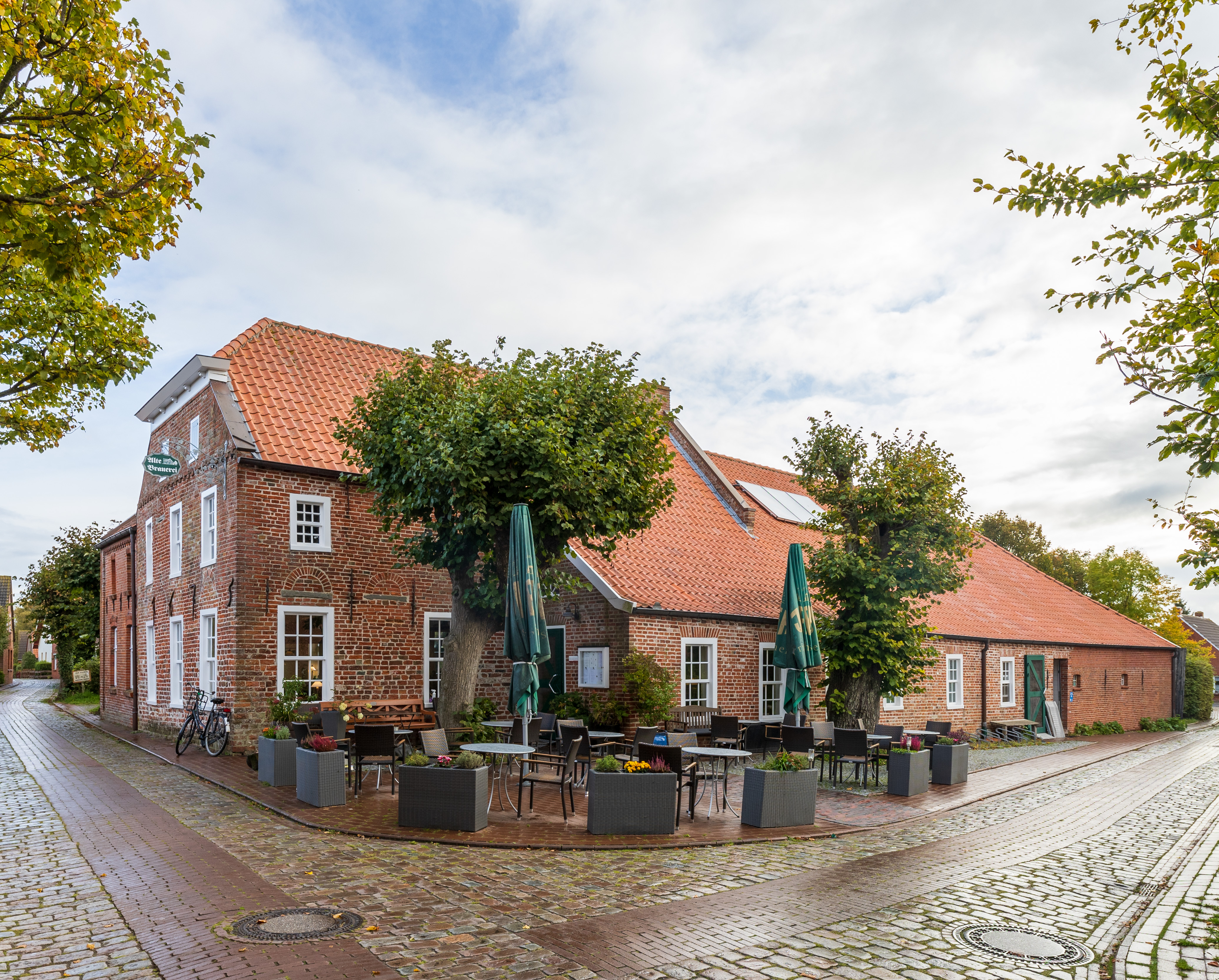
Brewery

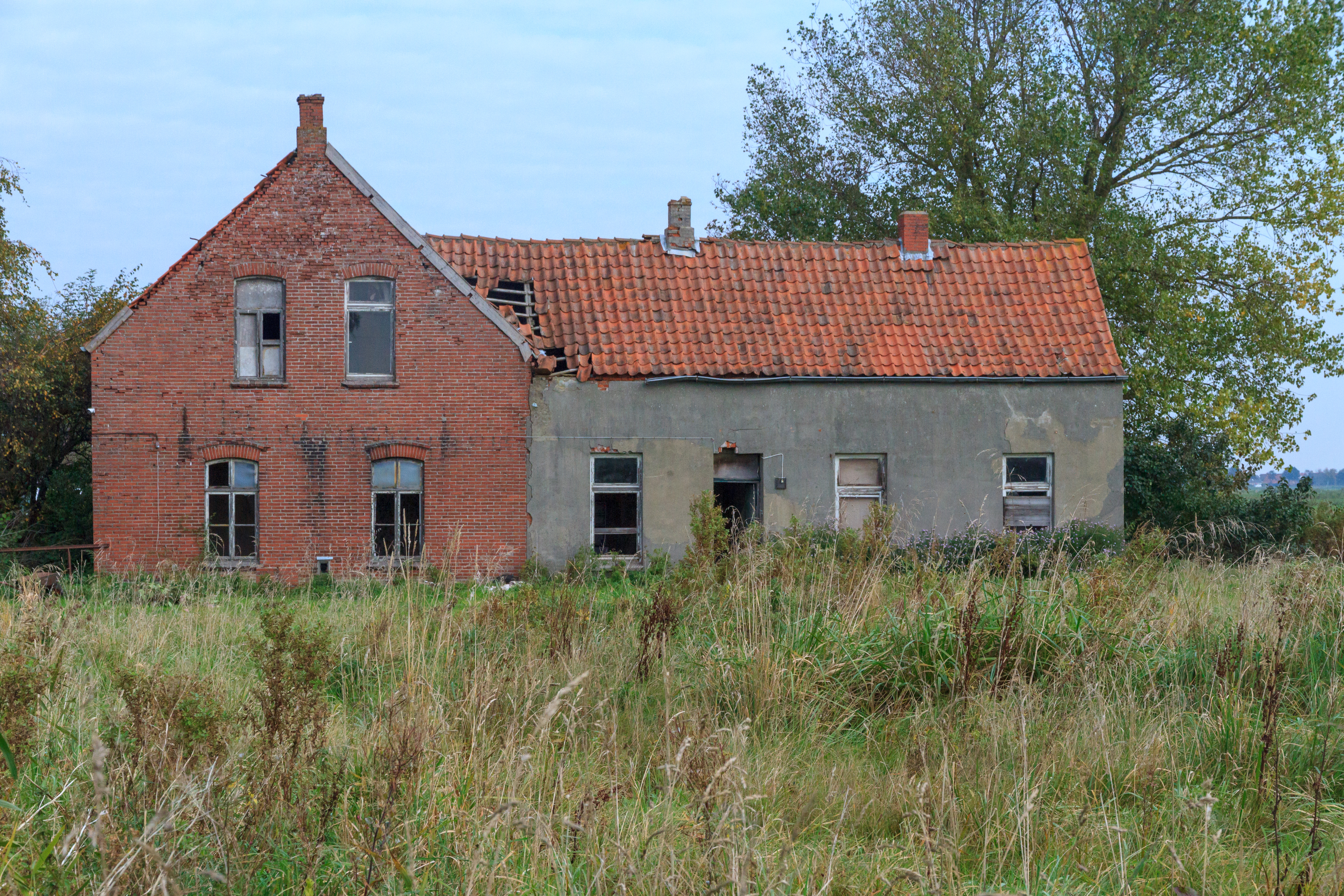
Former Pilsum brickworks

== Notable people ==
- Andreas Bodenstein (1486–1541), theologian
