= Westermarsch II =

- Stadtteil of Norden
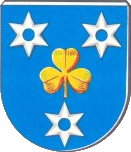
- Coat of arms

- Lage von Westermarsch II im Stadtgebiet von Norden
- Interactive map of Westermarsch II
- Location within Germany Location within Lower Saxony
- Coordinates: 53°35′35″N 07°07′35″E
- Country: Germany
- State: Lower Saxony
- Town: Norden

Area
  - Total: 11.687 km^{2} (4.512 sq mi)
- Elevation: 1 m (3.3 ft)

Population (2016-12-31)
  - Total: 507
  - Density: 43.4/km^{2} (112/sq mi)
- Time zone: UTC+01:00 (CET)
  - Summer (DST): UTC+02:00 (CEST)
- Postal codes: 26506
- Dialling codes: 04931

Westermarsch II was an independent municipality until the 1972 territorial reform in Lower Saxony and, as such, a member of the collective municipality (Samtgemeinde) of Leybucht in Lower Saxony. Today Westermarsch II is a village in the East Frisian borough of Norden with around 500 inhabitants (as at 12/2016). The village parish covers an area of 11.69 km². The main settlement of Westermarsch II is associated in public perception with the village of Norddeich, with which it has grown together. The boundary between the two runs down the middle of the road, Dörper Weg.

== Name ==
The name Westermarsch II denotes the place as being in the west of the marshlands in the historical region of Norderland (see Ostermarsch). The Roman numeral in the name of the village distinguishes the former communal municipality (Kommunalgemeinde) from its neighbouring village of Westermarsch I.

== History ==
The exact date that the village was founded is unknown. Even before the land was dyked, people settled in the area on artificial hills, the so-called warfts, of which several have survived at least in place names like Osterwarf, Westerwarf, Waterwarf, Trumschlag, Ülkebült, Klooster and Kugel. They are estimated to be about 1,000 to 1,500 years old. In 1361 the region was first known as Westermarsch after being dyked in. In 1871 the region was divided into Westermarsch I & II.

On 1 July 1972 the municipality of Westermarsch II was incorporated into the borough of Norden. The village has been designated since 2010 as a North Sea health spa (Nordseeheilbad).
