= Pilsum Lighthouse =

Lighthouse in Lower Saxony, Germany

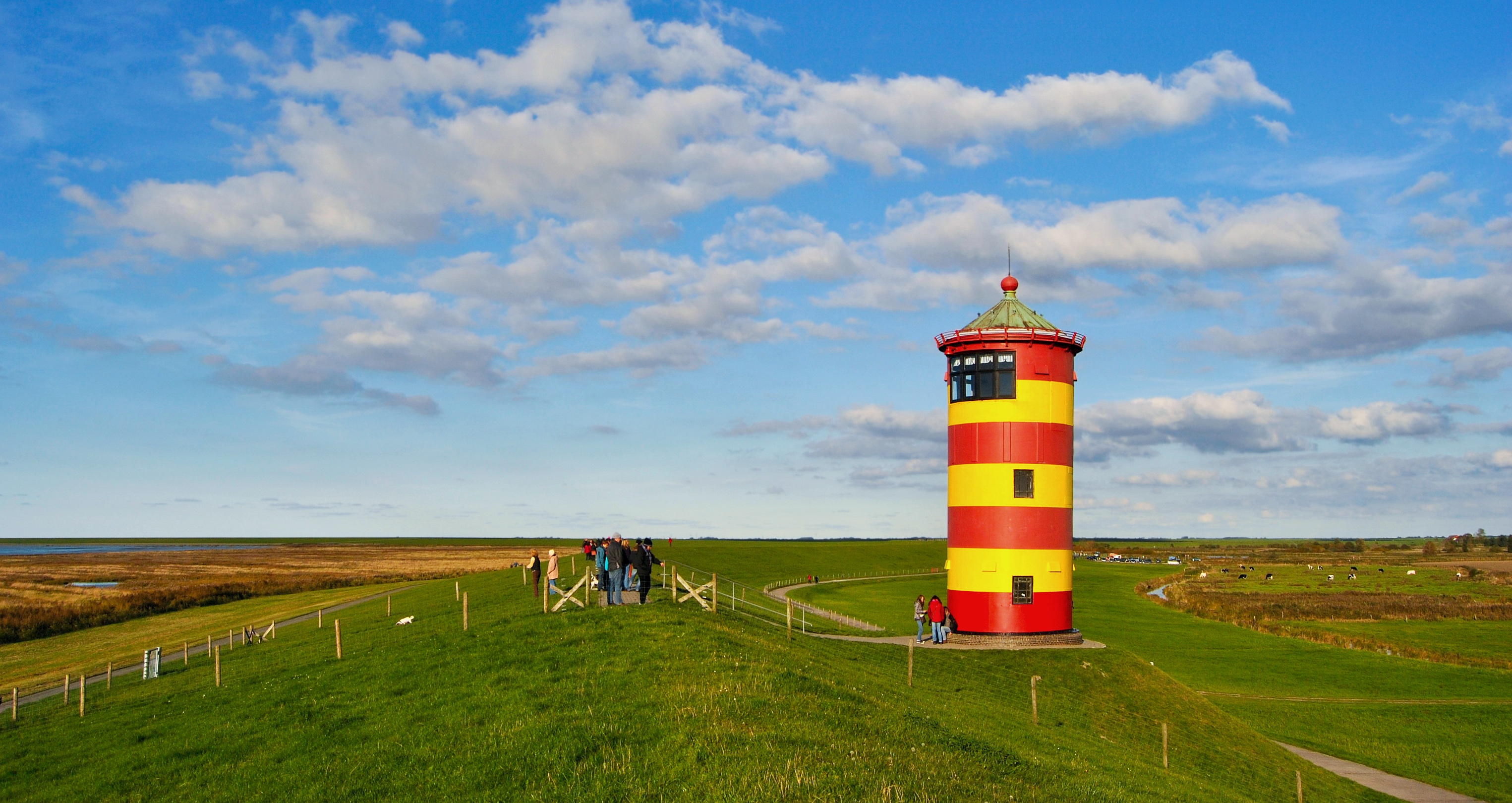
- Pilsum Lighthouse on the dyke
- Location: Greetsiel, Krummhörn, Germany
- Coordinates: 53.498013°N 7.045658°E

Tower
- Constructed: 1891
- Construction: cast iron tower
- Height: 11 metres (36 ft)
- Shape: cylindrical tower with conical roof, no balcony and lantern
- Markings: tower with horizontal red and yellow bands, green roof
- Operator: Diechacht Krummhörn
- Heritage: architectural heritage monument in Lower Saxony

Light
- First lit: 1 October 1891
- Deactivated: 1915–2005
- Focal height: 15 m (49 ft)
- Characteristic: not available

Pilsum Lighthouse (German: Pilsumer Leuchtturm) was built in 1891 as a sector light for the Ems‌hörn channel on Germany's North Sea coast. It is located on a dyke near the village of Pilsum in the municipality of Krummhörn. It guided ships through the narrow channel until 1915. During the First World War, its light was extinguished so that enemy ships could not navigate the route. After that, it was no longer needed, because the channel was changed. The height of the structure is 11 metres; the height of the light about sea level is 15 metres. Today, the tower is one of the best-known symbols of East Frisia.

== Film ==
The tower grew in popularity as a result of the film Otto: The Alien from East Frisia by comedian Otto Waalkes. In the film Otto lives in the lighthouse. Although the lighthouse is one of the central scenes in Otto: The Alien from East Frisia, for some reason the picture used on cinema advertisements and later on the inlays of the video and DVD editions was of the Westerheversand Lighthouse in Schleswig-Holstein, not the Pilsum Lighthouse.

== See also ==
- List of lighthouses and lightvessels in Germany
