= Ostermarsch, Lower Saxony =

Ostermarsch
- District of Norden
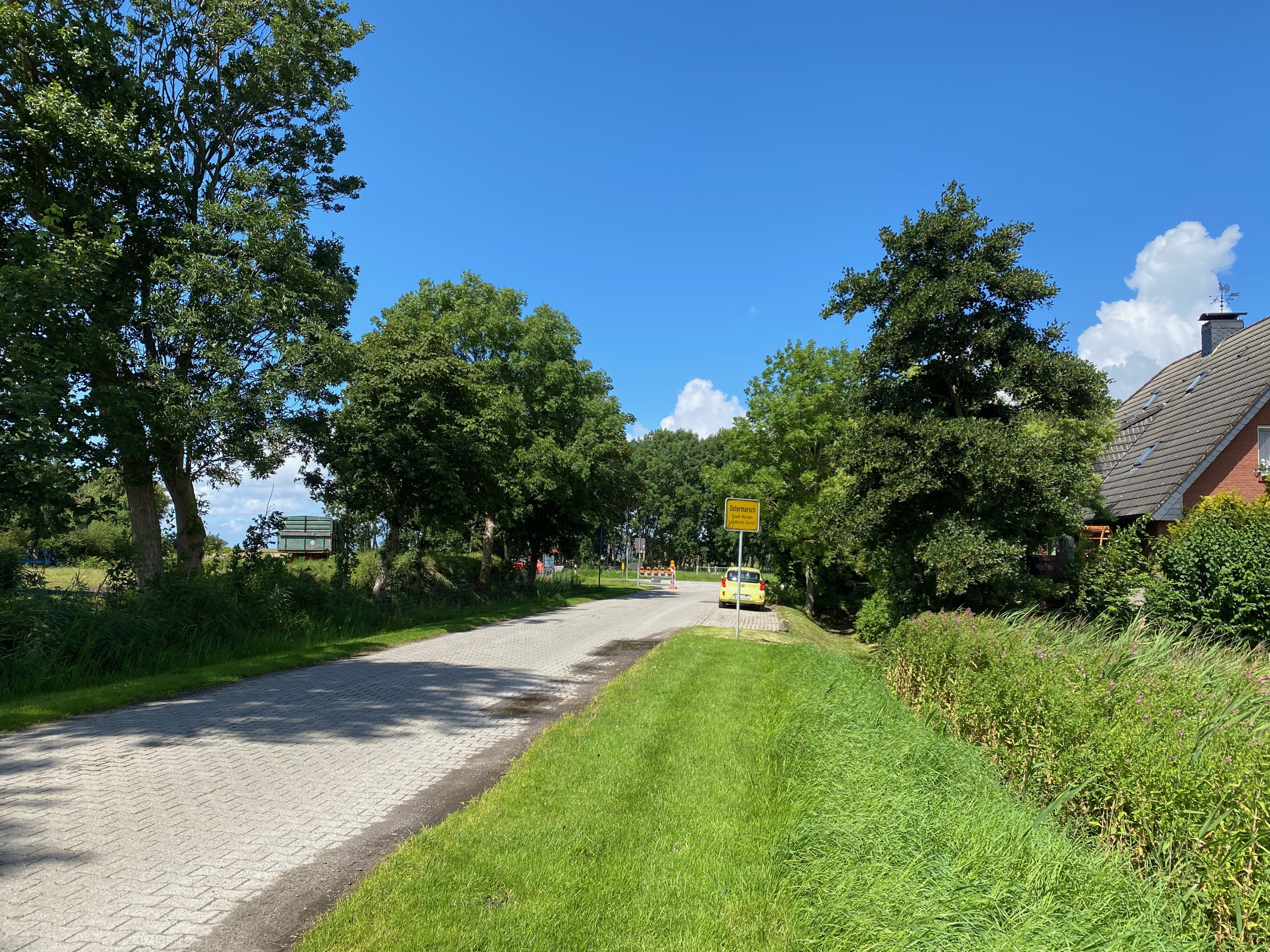
- Entry of Ostermarsch

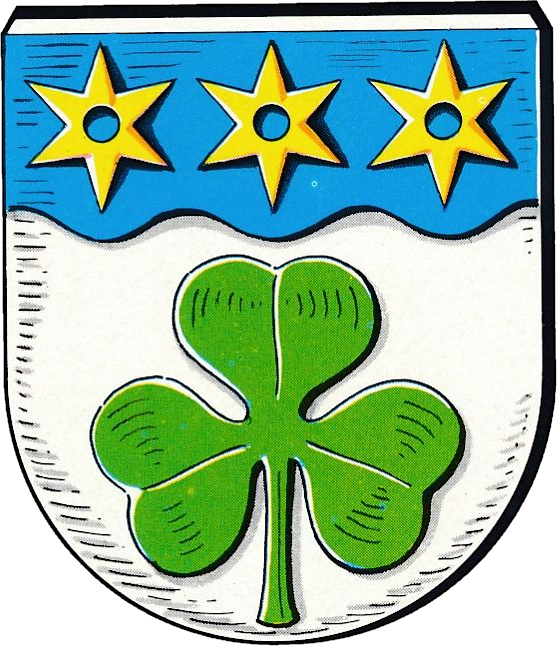
- Coat of arms

- Location of Ostermarsch within Norden
- Interactive map of Ostermarsch
- Location within Germany Location within Lower Saxony
- Coordinates: 53.64725°N 7.23991°E
- Country: Germany
- State: Lower Saxony
- District: Aurich
- City: Norden

Area
  - District of Norden: 13.14 km^{2} (5.07 sq mi)
- Elevation: 2 m (6.6 ft)

Population
  - Metro: 274
- Time zone: UTC+01:00 (CET)
  - Summer (DST): UTC+02:00 (CEST)
- Dialling codes: 04938
- Vehicle registration: 26506

Ostermarsch is a district (Stadtteil) of the East Frisian city of Norden, in Lower Saxony. It is located to the northeast of Norden's city center. The area of today's district was incorporated into Norden during the Lower Saxony municipal reform in 1972. Until then, Ostermarsch was an independent municipality. The name refers to the location of the polder east from other two of Norden's districts, Westermarsch I and Westermarsch II.

== Gallery ==
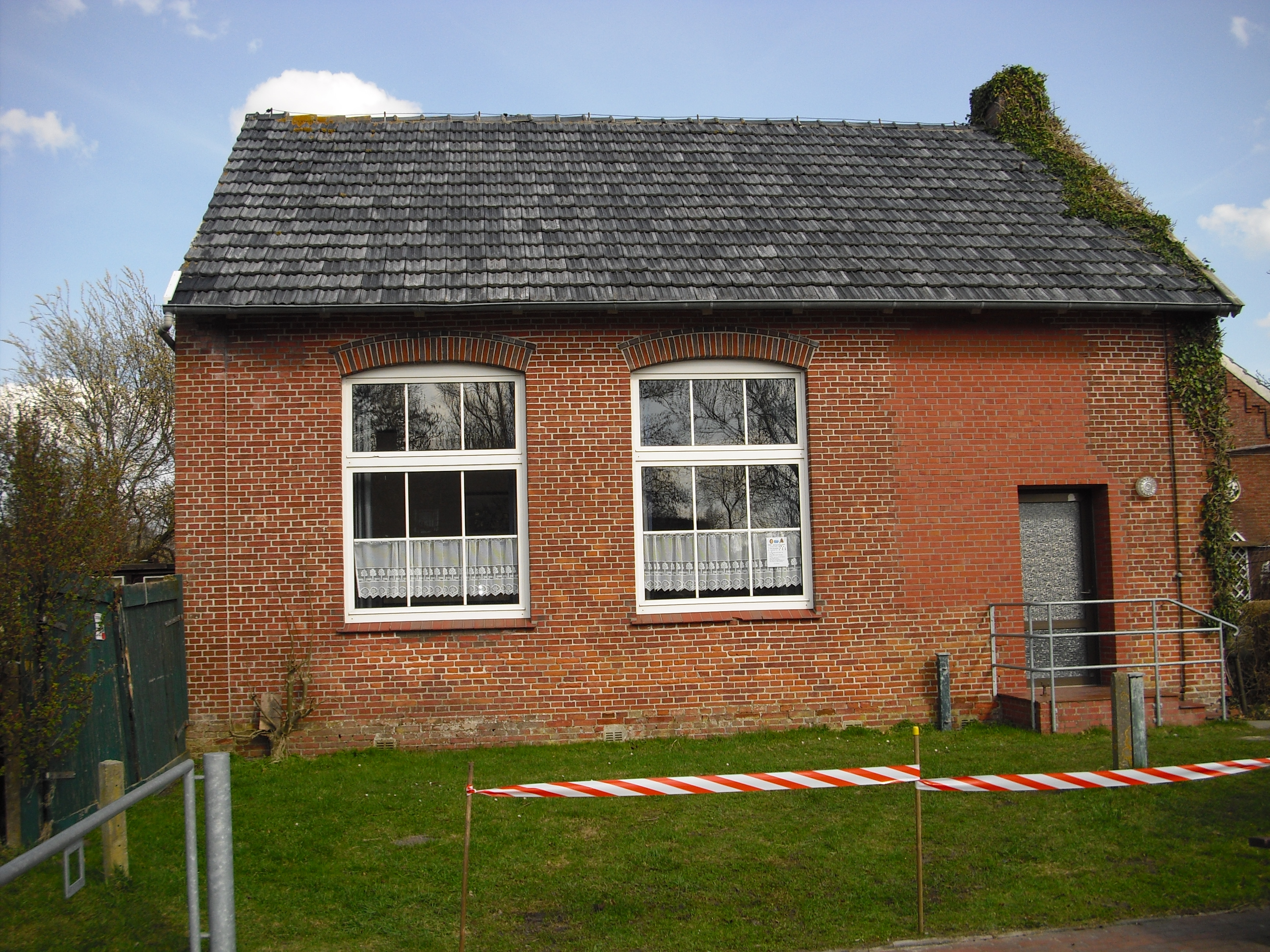
Former school

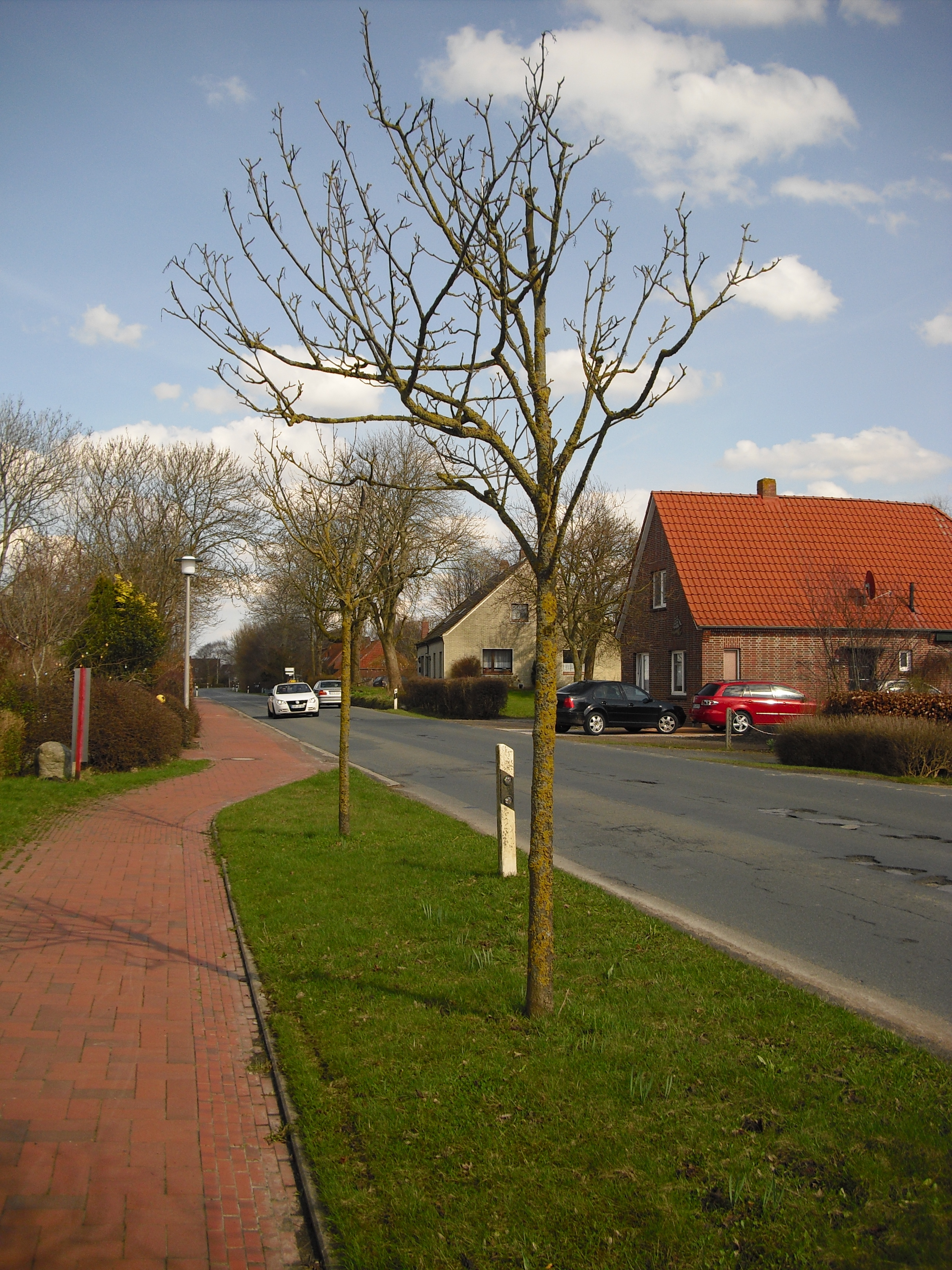
Hauptstraße

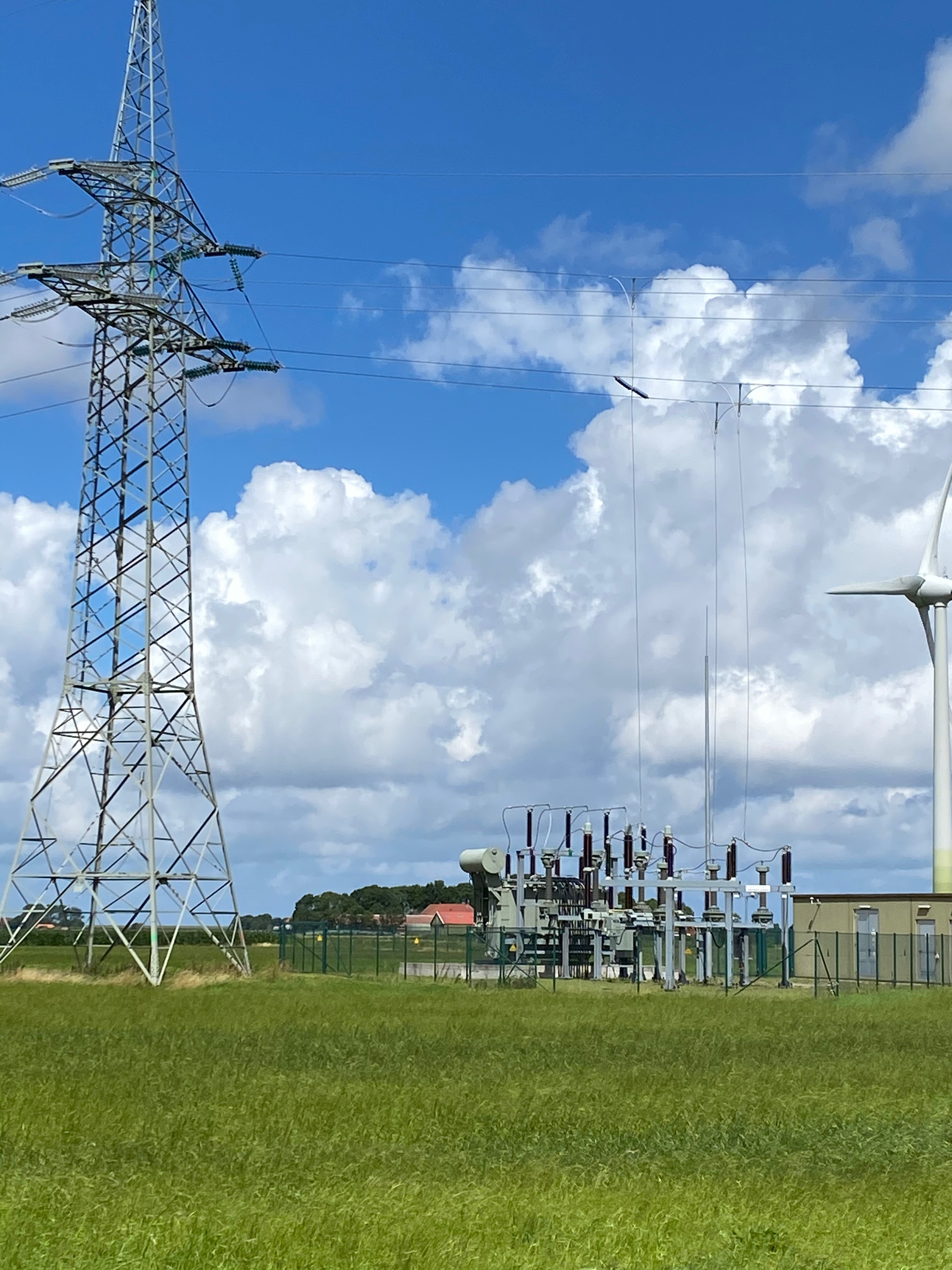
Substation
