= Neuwesteel =

- Stadtteil of Norden
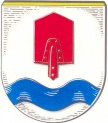
- Coat of arms

- Lage von Neuwesteel im Stadtgebiet von Norden
- Interactive map of Neuwesteel
- Location within Germany Location within Lower Saxony
- Coordinates: 53°32′13″N 07°9′37″E
- Country: Germany
- State: Lower Saxony
- Town: Norden

Area
  - Total: 15.068 km^{2} (5.818 sq mi)
- Elevation: 1 m (3.3 ft)

Population (2016-12-31)
  - Total: 337
  - Density: 22.4/km^{2} (57.9/sq mi)
- Time zone: UTC+01:00 (CET)
  - Summer (DST): UTC+02:00 (CEST)
- Postal codes: 26506
- Dialling codes: 04931

Neuwesteel is part of the borough of Norden in East Frisia in the northwest of the German state of Lower Saxony. It is the third most recent quarter after Tidofeld and Leybuchtpolder, because it was only founded on 11 July 1934.

On the terrain of the present parish lay the village of Westeel which was submerged in 1373 when the Leybucht bay flooded the area. Parts of the Leybucht were then dyked over the course of the centuries. In earlier centuries this was done manually and using spades, which is why the spade forms part of the Neuwesteel coat of arms. In the years 1928 and 1929 the roughly 600-hectare Leypolder was dyked. On this polder has stood the village of Neuwesteel since 1934. Initially it was part of the municipality of Süderpolder. On 1 October the whole municipality of Süderpolder was renamed Neuwesteel.

The municipality of Neuwesteel became part of the collective municipality of Leybucht in 1965. As part of the territorial reforms in Lower Saxony in 1972 Neuwesteel was incorporated into the borough of Norden. As an incorporated subdistrict Neuwesteel still has a parish chairman (Ortsvorsteher), who represents the concerns of the roughly 340 inhabitants to the borough of Norden.

Because the dyked polder soil is very fertile, the region was used from the very beginning for agricultural purposes. Cattle farming and crops predominate, especially the cultivation of potatoes.

In Neuwesteel is the Leybucht Pumping Station, part of the Drainage Association of Norden, which ensures that the lower lying areas are drained via the Norder Tief. In addition to the pumping station is a campsite. Because there are no bridges for several kilometres along the Norder Tief, the river may be crossed in Neuwesteel on a Pünte, a type of raft. However, it is only for pedestrians and cyclists.
