= Imke Folkerts Prize for Fine Arts =

Visual arts award

The Imke Folkerts Prize is a competition for artworks (genres: painting, graphic art, photography and/or sculpture). The Prize consists of 10,000 euros and a special exposition of the short-listed artworks within the Greetsiel Week (Greetsieler Woche). The award began in 2004 and is given to artists every other year since the 2005 award. The award is open without any thematical restrictions to artists all over the world. Award ceremony is in the German fishing village Greetsiel (western part of East Frisia).

The jury consists of up to five members: artists, art critics, gallery owners, art historians, curators, academics and/or collectors. They can split the prize to reward young artists until the completion of their 30th year of life. The prize also can be split in different ways for specific reasons. The Prize is donated by David Folkerts-Landau and named after his grandmother.

== Former winners ==
- 2004: Francine Schrikkema, Michael Kerstgens, Chantur Chandar
- 2005: Astrid Brandt, Si-Chang Park, Sabine Seemann, Jub Mönster, Christian Holtmann
- 2007: Daniel Behrendt, Hieke Veenstra
- 2009: Eun Jung Kim, René Schoemakers, Eduard Kasper
- 2011: Claudia Berg, Malte Stiehl, Markus Keuler, Hinrich Brockmöller, Natalia Moor

== See also ==
- List of European art awards

== Sources ==
- Imke Folkerts Preis für bildende Kunst (German Wikipedia)
- Imke Folkerts Preis : German (Archive)
- Greetsiel Week (Greetsieler Woche) : German.
