= Westerheversand Lighthouse =

Lighthouse in Schleswig-Holstein, Germany

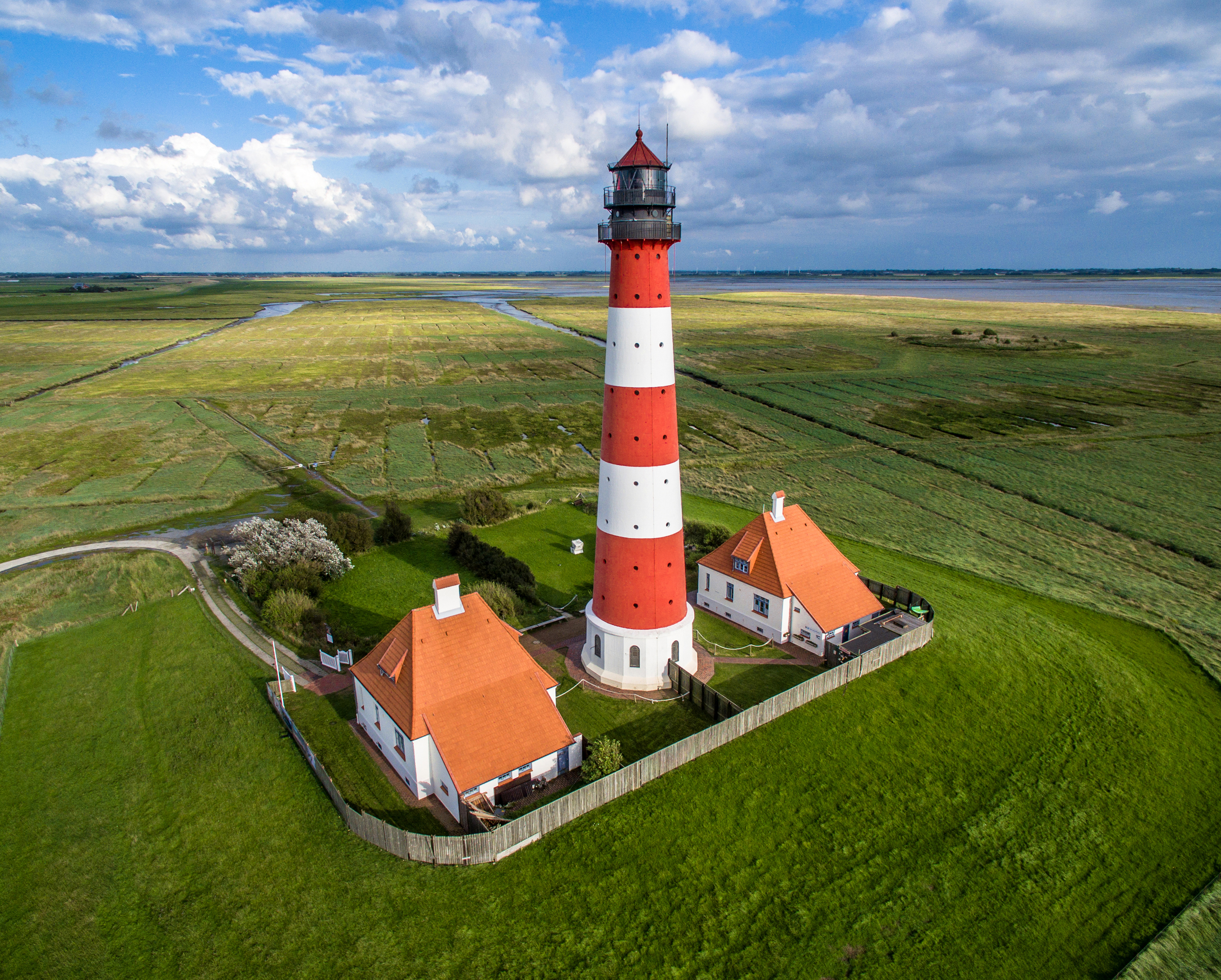
- Aerial view of the lighthouse, circa 2015
- Location: Westerhever, Schleswig-Holstein; Germany
- Coordinates: 54.3734°N 8.6399°E

Tower
- Constructed: 1908
- Foundation: concrete base
- Construction: cast iron tower
- Height: 40 metres (130 ft)
- Shape: tapered cylindrical tower on a basement with balcony and lantern
- Markings: tower painted with white and red horizontal bands, black lantern and balcony
- Operator: Nationalpark Schleswig-Holsteinisches Wattenmeer
- Heritage: Heritage monument in Schleswig-Holstein

Light
- Focal height: 41 metres (135 ft)
- Range: 21 nmi (39 km; 24 mi) (white), 17 nmi (31 km; 20 mi) (red), 16 nmi (30 km; 18 mi) (green)
- Characteristic: Oc (3) WRG 15s.

The Westerheversand Lighthouse (German: Leuchtturm Westerheversand) is located in Westerhever, Schleswig-Holstein, Germany. Considered to be one of the best-known lighthouses in northern Germany, it was built in 1908. Its cast iron tower is 40 metres (130 ft) high. The lighthouse is often used for weddings, and one of the two keeper's cottages has been adapted for use by the local registrar.

The tower has been open to visitors since 2001.

In the film Otto: The Alien from East Frisia by comedian Otto Waalkes, Otto is shown living in the Pilsum Lighthouse. However, for some reason the picture used on cinema advertisements and later on the inlays of the video and DVD editions was of the Westerheversand Lighthouse, not the Pilsum Lighthouse.

== See also ==
- List of lighthouses in Germany
