= Westerhever =

Westerhever Vesterhever
- Municipality
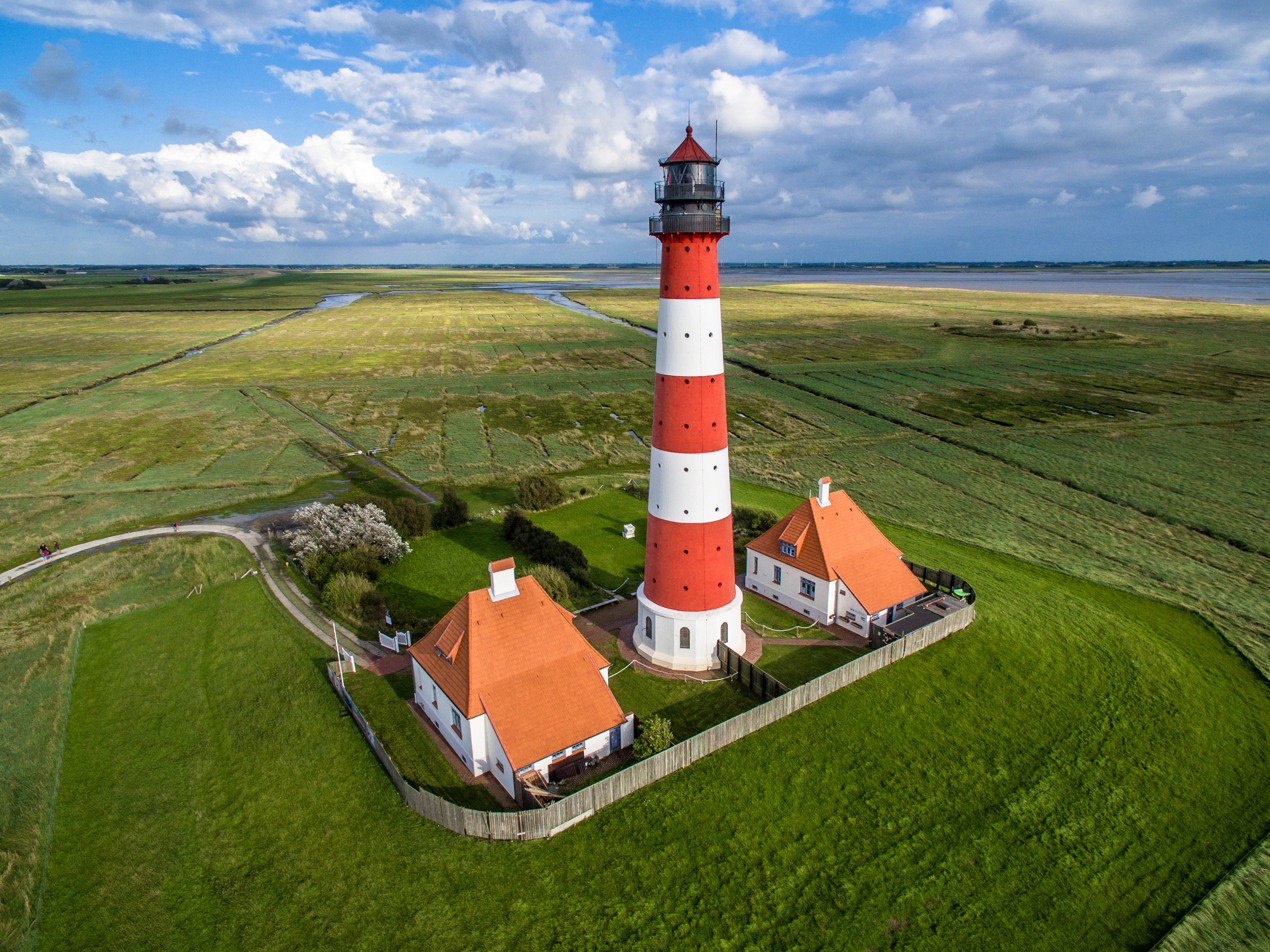
- Aerial view of the Westerheversand Lighthouse

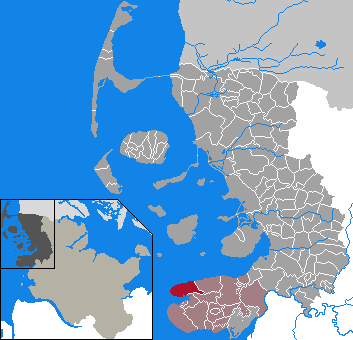
- Location of Westerhever; Vesterhever within Nordfriesland district
- Interactive map of Westerhever; Vesterhever
- Location within Germany Location within Schleswig-Holstein
- Coordinates: 54°23′N 8°40′E
- Country: Germany
- State: Schleswig-Holstein
- District: Nordfriesland

Government
  - Mayor: Albert Pahl

Area
  - Total: 13.21 km^{2} (5.10 sq mi)
- Elevation: 0 m (0 ft)

Population (2025-12-31)
  - Total: 94
  - Density: 7.1/km^{2} (18/sq mi)
- Time zone: UTC+01:00 (CET)
  - Summer (DST): UTC+02:00 (CEST)
- Postal codes: 25881
- Dialling codes: 04865
- Vehicle registration: NF
- Website: www.amt-eiderstedt. kommunen. nordfriesland. city-map.de

Westerhever (Danish: Vesterhever) is a municipality in Nordfriesland in the German state of Schleswig-Holstein.

== Geography ==
Westerhever lies on the northwestern tip of the Eiderstedt Peninsula. The Westerheversand Lighthouse is a major landmark on the peninsula which is surrounded by salt marshes. The saltmarshes, lighthouse, and beaches attract about 80,000 visitors every year.

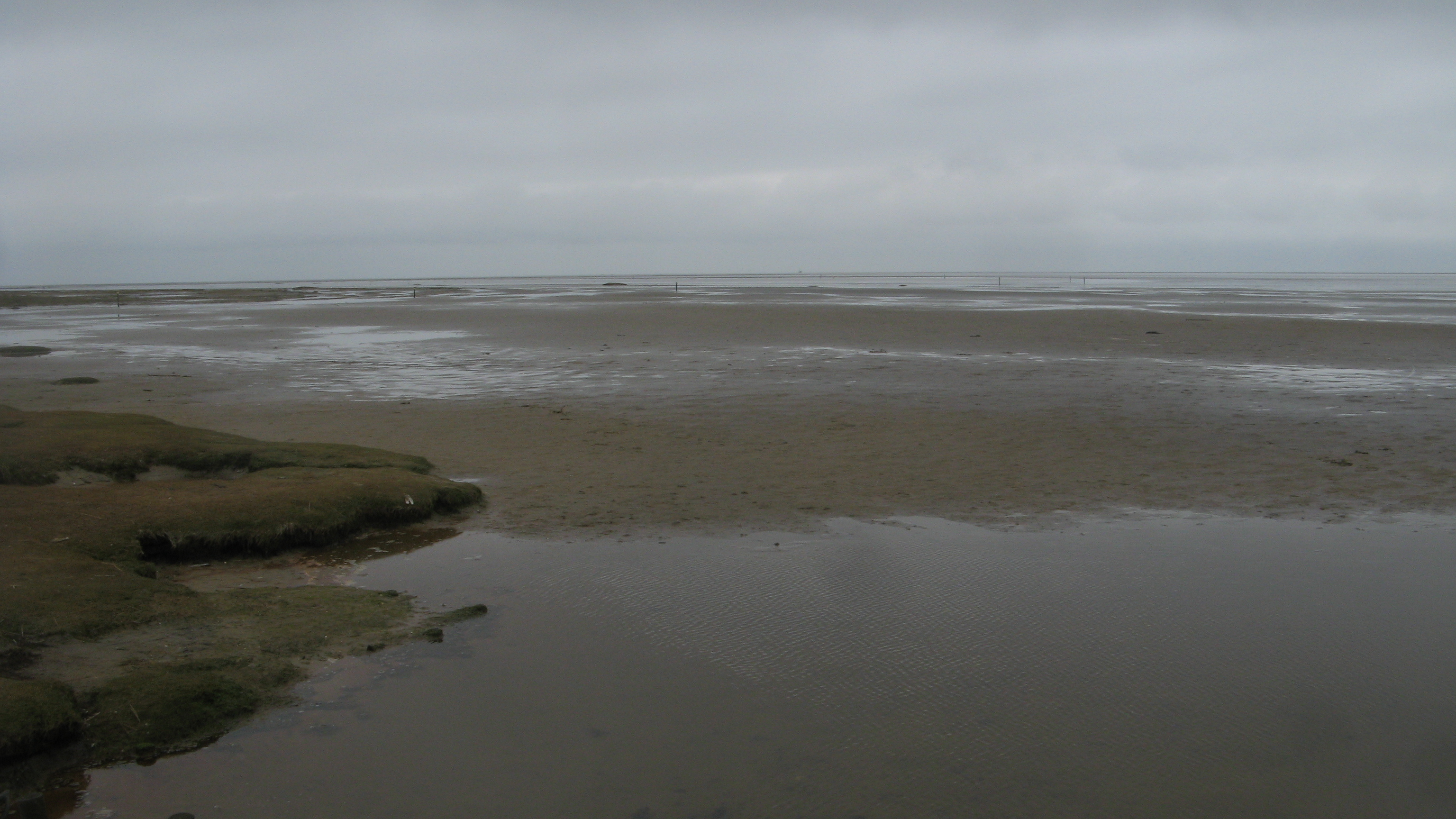
Salt marshes and Wadden Sea

== History ==
The island Westerhever was first settled by humans in the 12th Century. The first humans there built a ring dike to protect the land.
