= Ubbo Emmius =

German historian and geographer (1547–1625)

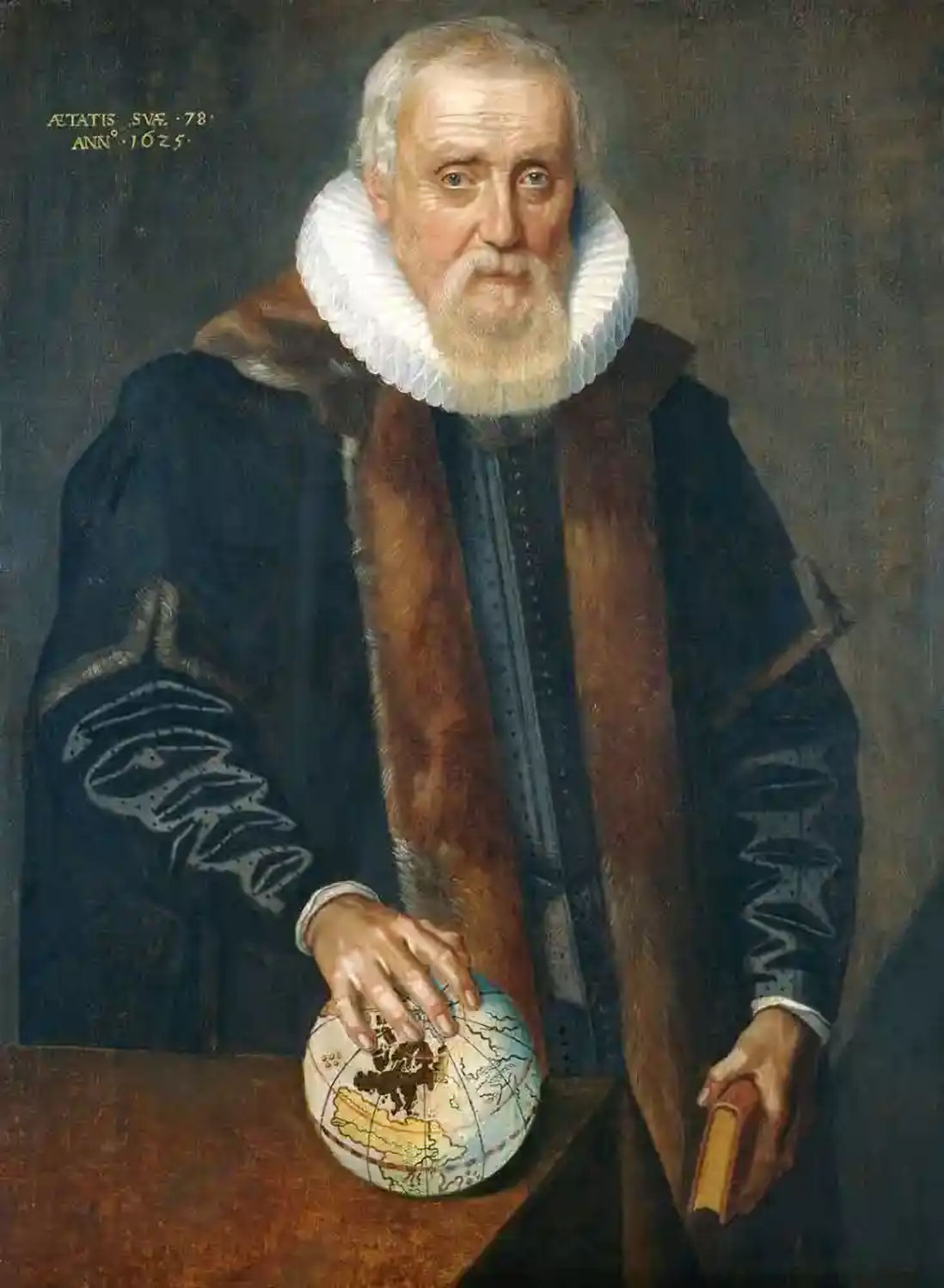
Ubbo Emmius

Ubbo Emmius (5 December 1547 – 9 December 1625) was a German historian and geographer.

== Early life ==
Ubbo Emmius was born on 5 December 1547 in Greetsiel, East Frisia. From the ages of 9 to 18 Emmius studied in a Latin school, before having to leave on the death of his father, a Lutheran preacher. After studying at Rostock, at the age of 30, Emmius took classes in Geneva with Theodorus Beza, a Calvinist who influenced Emmius greatly.

== Life ==
Upon returning to East Friesland in 1579 he took the position of rector in the very school in which he was taught, the college at Norden. He was subsequently sacked by the local court in 1587 because, as a Calvinist, he would not subscribe to the confession of Augsburg. Following this, in 1588, the Calvinist count Johan offered him the position of rector in the Latin school of Leer (later renamed the Ubbo-Emmius-Gymnasium). Whilst remaining in Leer it is known that Emmius had corresponded with many other important people of the time who had fled from Groningen after the area fell into the hands of the Spanish. When Groningen surrendered to Prince Maurits in 1594 those who fled returned and offered Ubbo the position of rector in St Maarten school. When in 1614 the decision was made to form a university, under the guidance of Emmius. As a result, he was chosen as the principal and professor of history and Greek and ultimately became the first rector magnificus of the Academy in which he formed.

== Work ==
Ubbo Emmius made prominent contributions to historiography. His primary works were on the History of the Frisian Territories: his 6 part Rerum Frisicarum historiae decades from 1592 to 1616. In one of his other important works titled the Chronologicum he compared the histories of different nations that used different calendars.

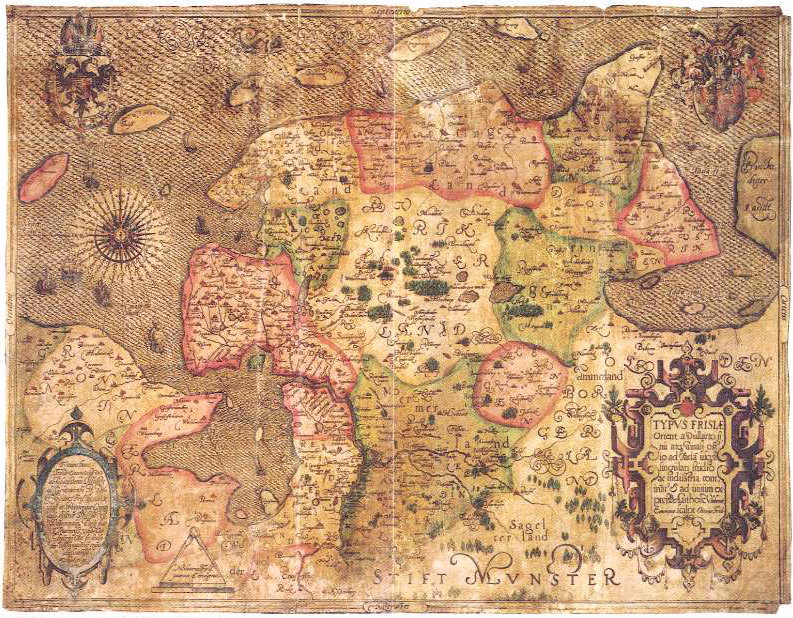
Emmius' map of East Frisia (1595)

Other works include:

- Opus chronologicum (Groningen, 1619)
- Vetus Graecia illustrata (Leiden, 1626)
- Historia temporis nostri, which was first published at Groningen in 1732

An account of his life, written by Nicholas Mulerius, was published, with the lives of other professors of Groningen, at Groningen in 1638.

== Death ==
Ubbo Emmius died on the 9 December 1625 in Groningen; his grave stone reads:

For the immortal memory of the famous and faithful old man Ubbo Emmius, a Frisian from Greetsiel, first rector of the academy, theologist of the pure doctrine, excellent philologist, perfect historian.
