= Greetsiel =

- Ortsteil of Krummhörn
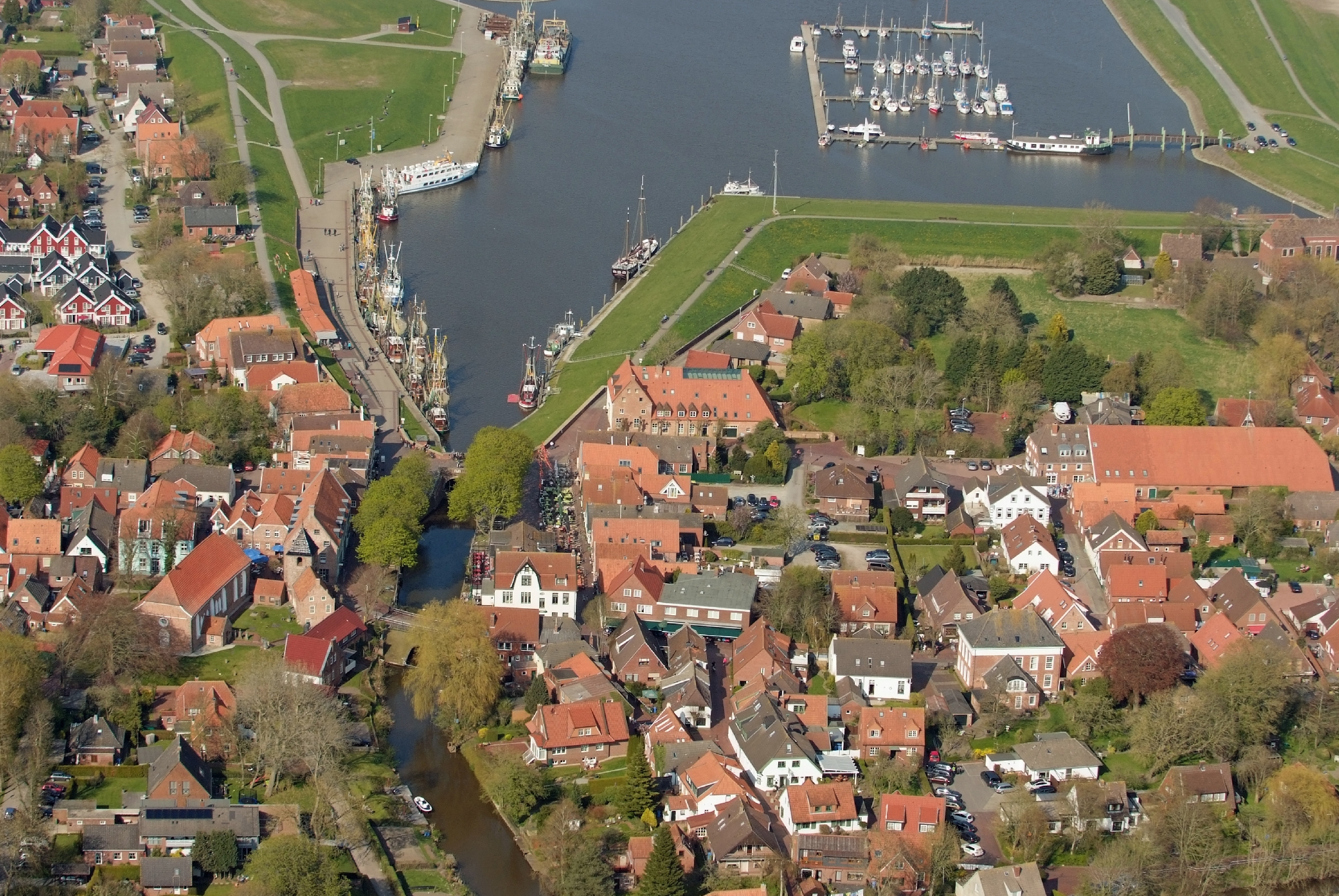
- Aerial view of the historical center

- Coat of arms
- Interactive map of Greetsiel
- Location within Germany Location within Lower Saxony
- Coordinates: 53°29′55″N 07°05′53″E
- Country: Germany
- State: Lower Saxony
- District: Aurich
- Municipality: Krummhörn

Area
  - Total: 15.17 km^{2} (5.86 sq mi)
- Elevation: 2 m (6.6 ft)

Population (2012-12-31)
  - Total: 1,450
  - Density: 95.6/km^{2} (248/sq mi)
- Time zone: UTC+01:00 (CET)
  - Summer (DST): UTC+02:00 (CEST)
- Postal codes: 26736
- Dialling codes: 04926

Greetsiel is a small port on the bight of Leybucht in western East Frisia, Germany, that was first documented in letters from the year 1388. Since 1972, Greetsiel has been part of the municipality of Krummhörn, which has its administrative seat in Pewsum. The nearest railway station is at Emden, about 15–20 kilometres (9.3–12.4 mi) away, and the two towns are linked by a bus service.

Although originally just a small but picturesque fishing village, Greetsiel has become a major tourist attraction. In December 2006, it had 1,534 inhabitants, but the number of people living in the village significantly increases during the summer months and over the Christmas holidays.

== Geography ==
Greetsiel is situated on the Leybucht, a small bay on the East Frisian coast. Over time, large parts of the bay were reclaimed behind dykes, so that Greetsiel is the only port in the bay today.

In the 1990s, the Leybuchthörn was completed. This structure extends as a spit out into the Wadden Sea. Within the Leybuchthörn is a reservoir and the approach channel from the North Sea into Greetsiel Harbour (Greetsieler Hafen). Between the port and the open sea is a lock. Since the completion of the structure, Greetsiel Harbour has been accessible from the sea, irrespective of the tide.

The distance to the nearest towns of Emden and Norden is 15–20 km (9.3–12.4 mi) to the north and south respectively.

== History ==
Greetsiel is first mentioned in the records in letters dating to the year 1388 (Ocko I tom Brok). At that time, Hamburg's ships lay at anchor in the port of Greetsiel and had to pay tariffs.

The place was founded by the Domain of Appingen under the chiefs of Cirksena. While Appingen increasingly lost its importance, Greetsiel became the seat of the chief. In 1462 Count Edzard the Great was born at the Cirksenaburg; under his rule East Frisia extended from the River Weser as far as Groningen. In 1547 Ubbo Emmius was born here. On old Dutch maps the town is marked as Grietjezijl.

In creating the municipality of Krummhörn in 1972, a debate erupted over whether the administrative headquarters should be Pewsum or Greetsiel. Because Greetsiel was a more isolated location, Pewsum was preferred.

== Culture and points of interest ==
=== Buildings ===
Of all the East Frisian Siel villages (a Siel is a sluice in a dyke), Greetsiel has the best preserved old fishermen's cottages. In its picturesque fishing harbour there are still 28 shrimp cutters (Krabbenkutter). Other notable buildings are:

- Greetsiel Church, an Evangelical Reformed church. The rectangular, brick, aisleless church (Saalkirche) was built between 1380 and 1410 as the private church of the chief, Haro Edzardsna, in two stages. In 1401, long before its final completion, it was to be consecrated to Saint Mary. The building is crowned by a small flèche (Dachreiter) decorated with a clock. This is adorned by a 1730 weather vane in the shape of a ship. The actual clock tower stands off to one side. The simple interior, which at one time had a flat ceiling, has been covered by a slightly vaulted wooden ceiling since 1852. The organ was completely renovated in 1963, but its case is from 1738; the pulpit, however, had already been made in 1669.
- Steinhaus, the former seat of the Cirksena family. The brick building at the end of the high street (Hohe Straße) was built about 1600 on the foundations of a previous building erected around 1390. In the interior the original hall has been restored in the course of renovation work.
- Houses. Among the most famous photographic motifs in Greetsiel is the row of houses on Sielstraße flanking the harbour. The houses at No. 11 and No. 15, with their bell-shaped gables based on Dutch designs, are particularly striking. While the former is dated 1741, No. 15 was built in 1792. The Poppingas Old Bakery (Poppingas Alte Bäckerei), No. 21, from the 19th century is also found on Sielstraße and is used now as a museum, cafe and gallery; its interior has been preserved unchanged. Near the church is the so-called High House (Hohes Haus) at 1, Hohe Straße, a two-storey, sideways-on, brick building, which once served as the seat of the treasurer or Rentmeister. According to the anchor plate on the gable it dates to "1696", but is thought to have already been in decline by the middle of the 16th century. Today the building, whose street façade is covered with an ashlar facing, houses a hotel. The Amtmannshaus on Neuer Deich is probably from the same period, but was extensively renovated during the 19th century. In the latest renovation the exterior appearance of the house and its associated Gulf barn was changed significantly by the addition of modern dormers. In Mühlenstraße is Haus von Halem, built in 1794 and one of the most important residential examples of neoclassical architecture in East Frisia. The two-storey brick building with a hip roof is divided by a huge pilasters. The portal has a richly carved fanlights in the late rococo style.

=== Windmills ===
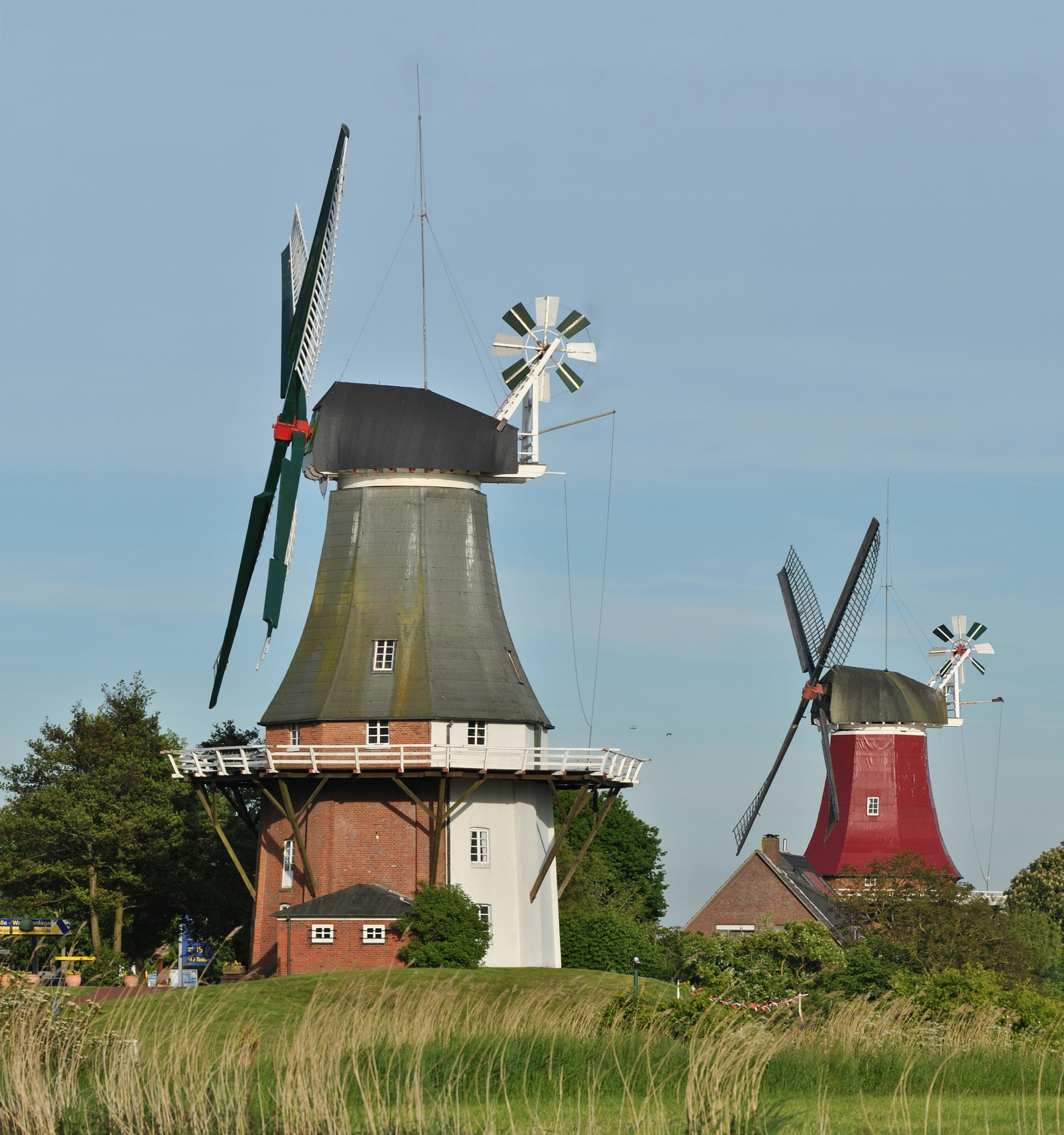

53.497586°N 7.100105°E

The twin windmills (German: Zwillingsmühlen) of Greetsiel-West date from 1856 (green) and Greetsiel-Ost from 1706 (red, renovated in 1921 with parts of Aurich's Wallmühle mill of 1750). They are smock mills (German: Holländerwindmühlen).

=== Other places of interest ===
Other places of interest include the scoop wheel, the old Siel (1798), the new Siel (1887) and the Pilsum Lighthouse. Greetsiel also hosts the largest ship-in-a-bottle museum in Germany and Europe, with about 800 examples. Of all the places in the municipality of Krummhörn, Greetsiel has the highest influx of tourists.

=== Regular events ===
An annual painting and art exhibition, known as Greetsiel Week (Greetsieler Woche), is of national prominence. It has been running for more than 30 years and exhibits a range of works including art, ceramics, goldsmiths' products and sculptures. Every two years, the Imke Folkerts Prize for Fine Arts, worth 10,000 euros, is awarded at the event. Qualifying entries include works in the fields of art, graphics, photography and sculpture. There are also regular exhibitions in Greetsiel's twin windmills. Every year in mid-summer is the boat parade in which the majority of Greetsiel's cutters take part. The crews take guests on a roughly four-hour boat trip. The port also hosts a supporting programme of events with music and shrimp-shelling competitions.

== Transport ==
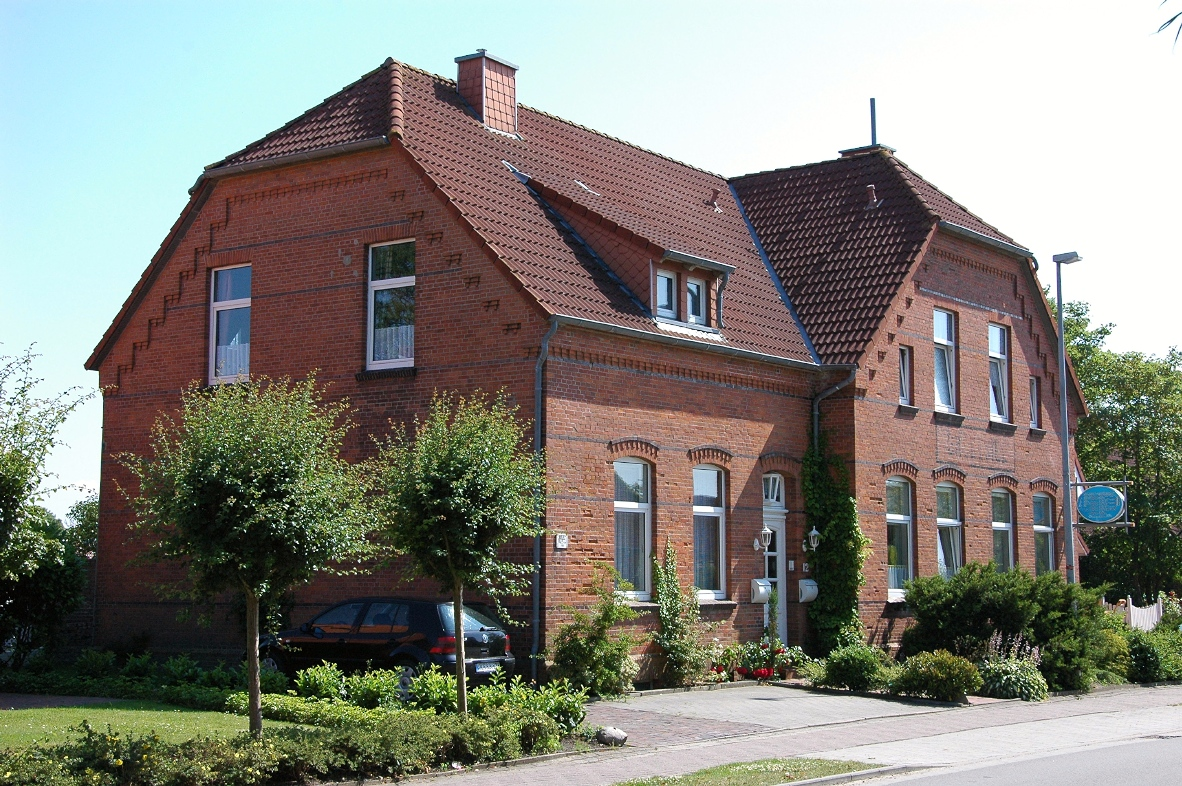
Former railway station buildings

Greetsiel is linked by state roads to Norden and Emden and from there the A 31.

At one time, the Emden-Pewsum-Greetsiel light railway linked Pewsum and Greetsiel with Emden. The operation of the 1,000 mm (3 ft 3 3/8 in) metre gauge gauge railway began in 1899 between Emden and Pewsum and, in 1906, the line was extended to Greetsiel. Kleinbahnstraße in Greetsiel recalls that period, along which there are still several railway buildings that are now used for other purposes. The narrow-gauge railway was closed in 1963, and passenger services have been taken over by buses since then. Today, Greetsiel is connected by bus with the former county town of Norden as well as Emden.

Greetsiel can also be reached by smaller boats from Emden. The Alte Greetsieler Sieltief and the Neue Greetsieler Sieltief connect the port with the East Frisian inland waterways network.

== Images ==
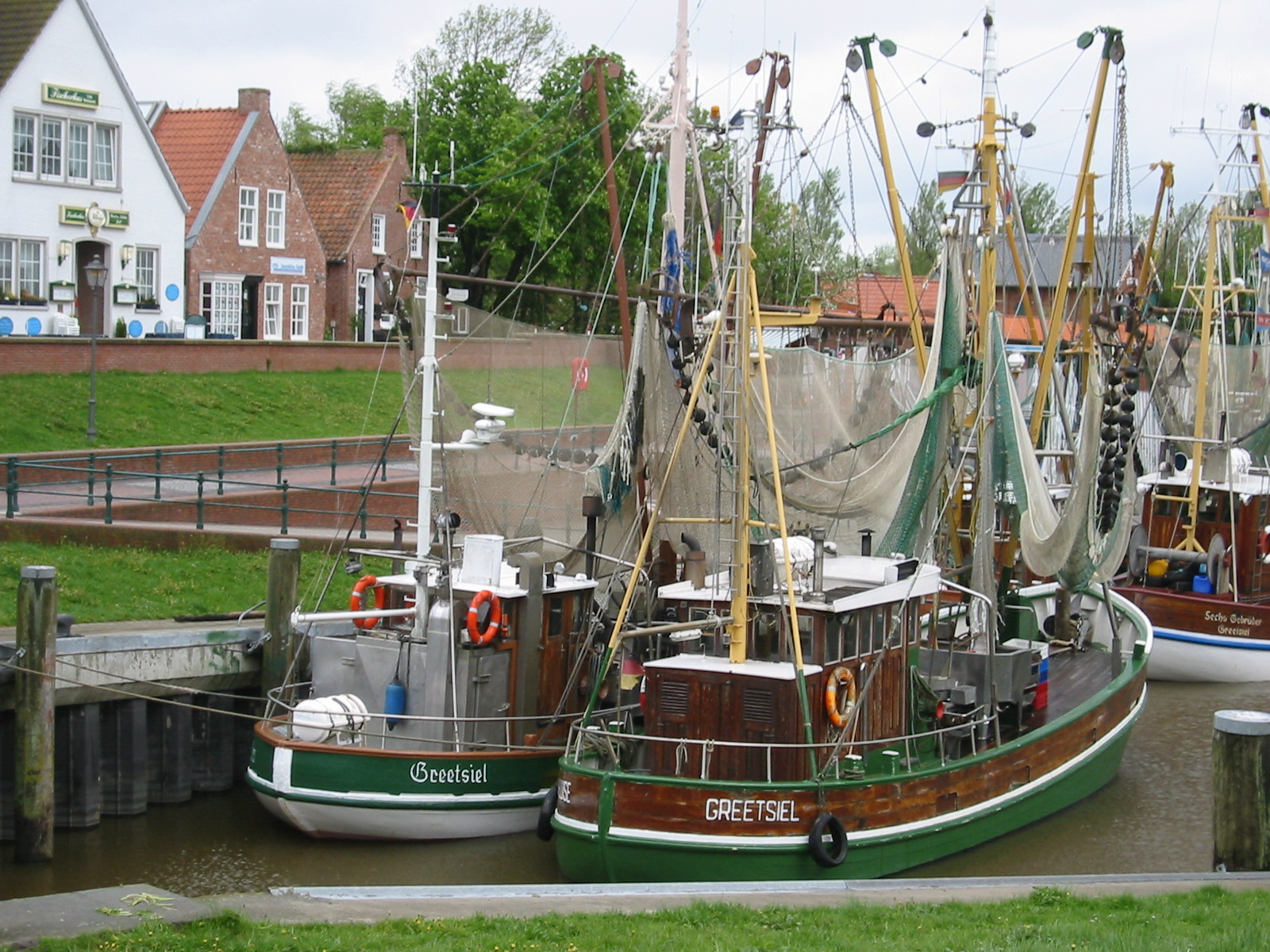
Greetsiel harbour

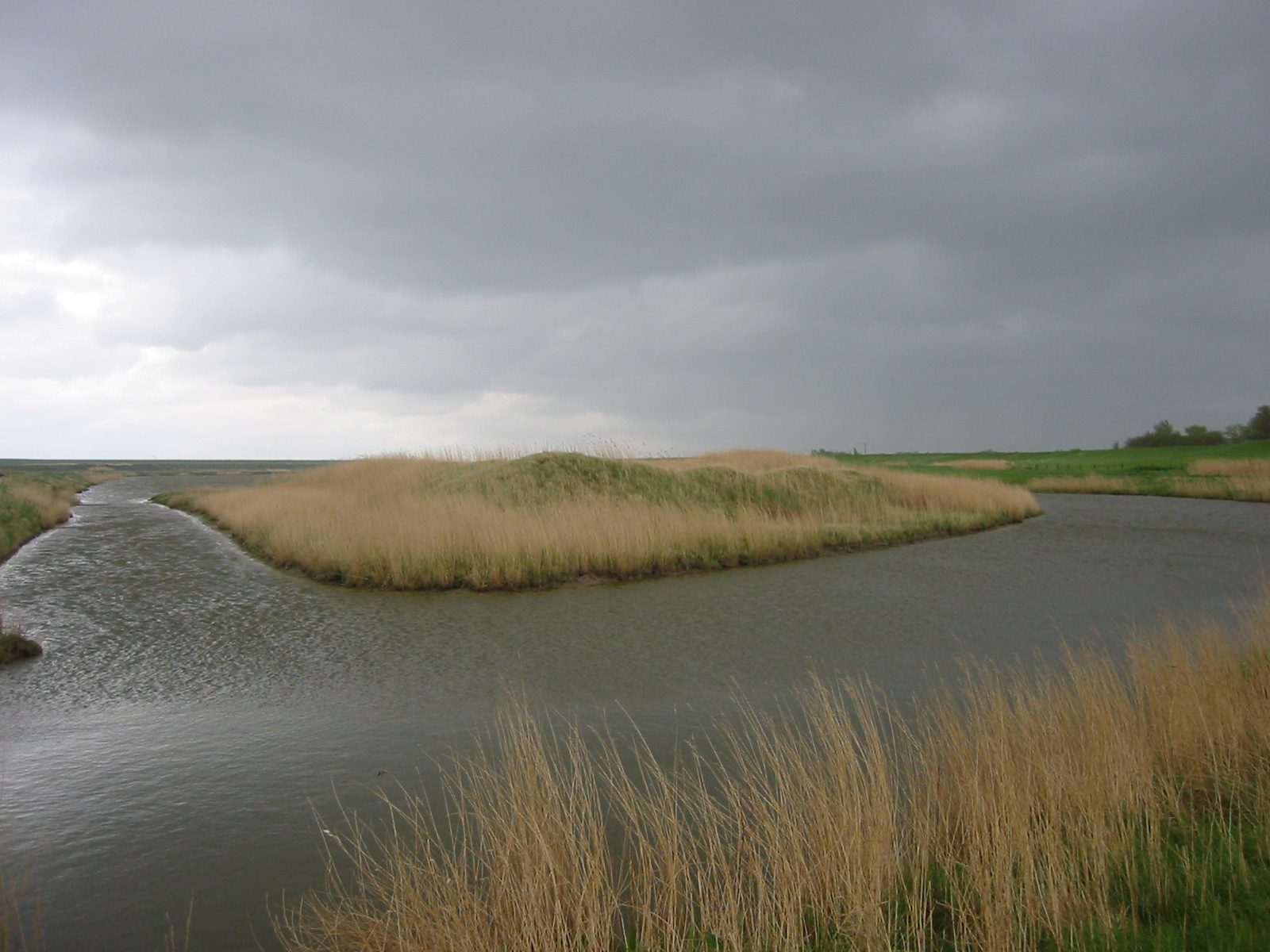
The landscape to the north of Greetsiel.

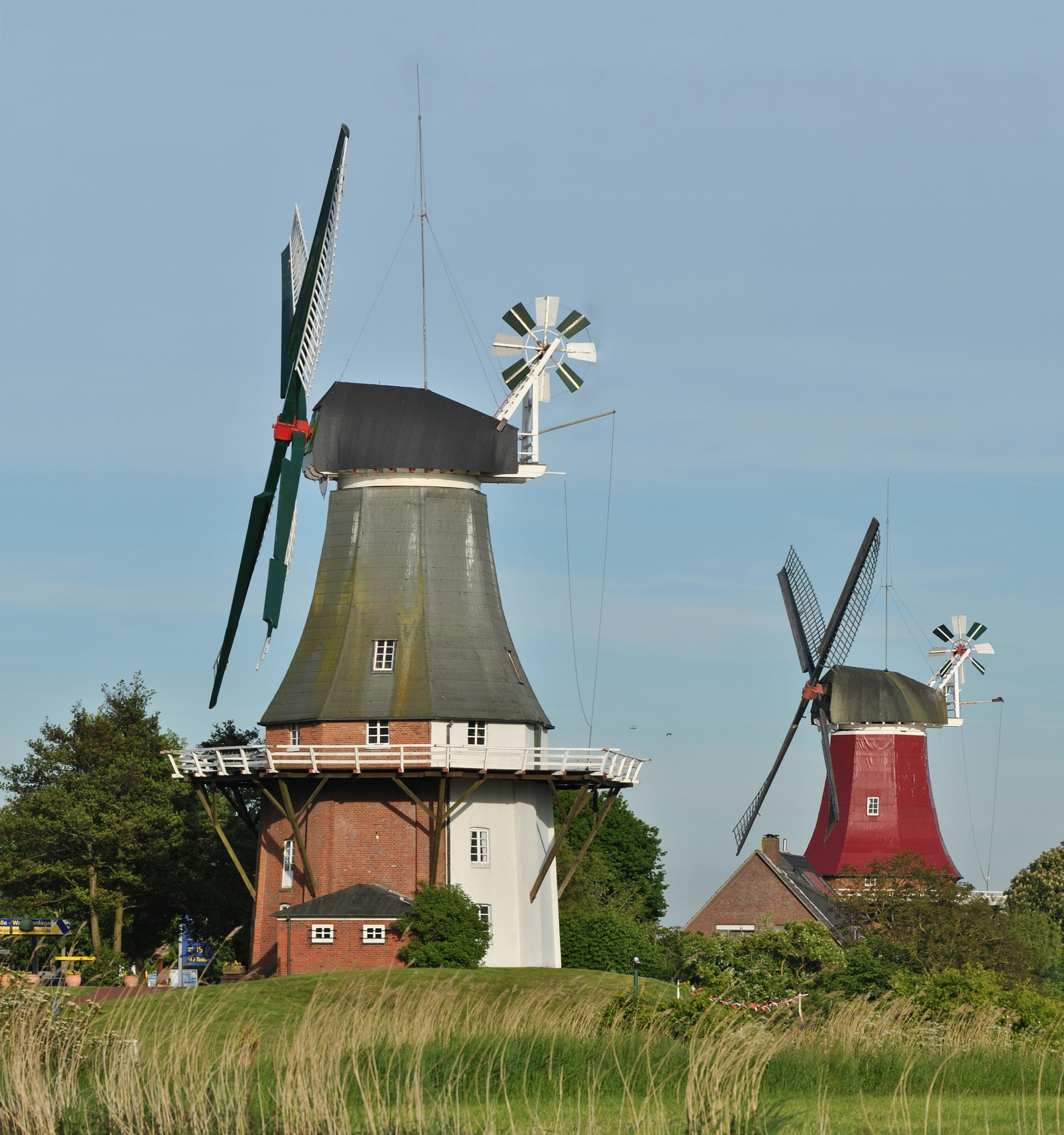
The twin windmills, seen from the west

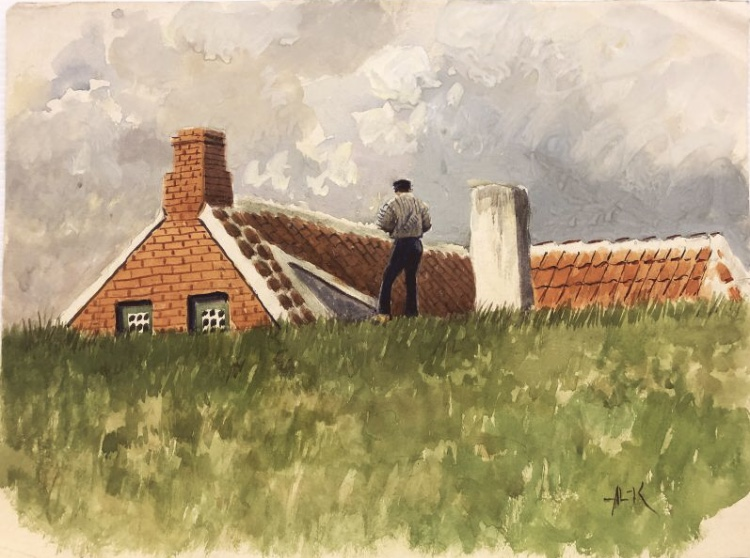
A dyke at Greetsiel, 1923

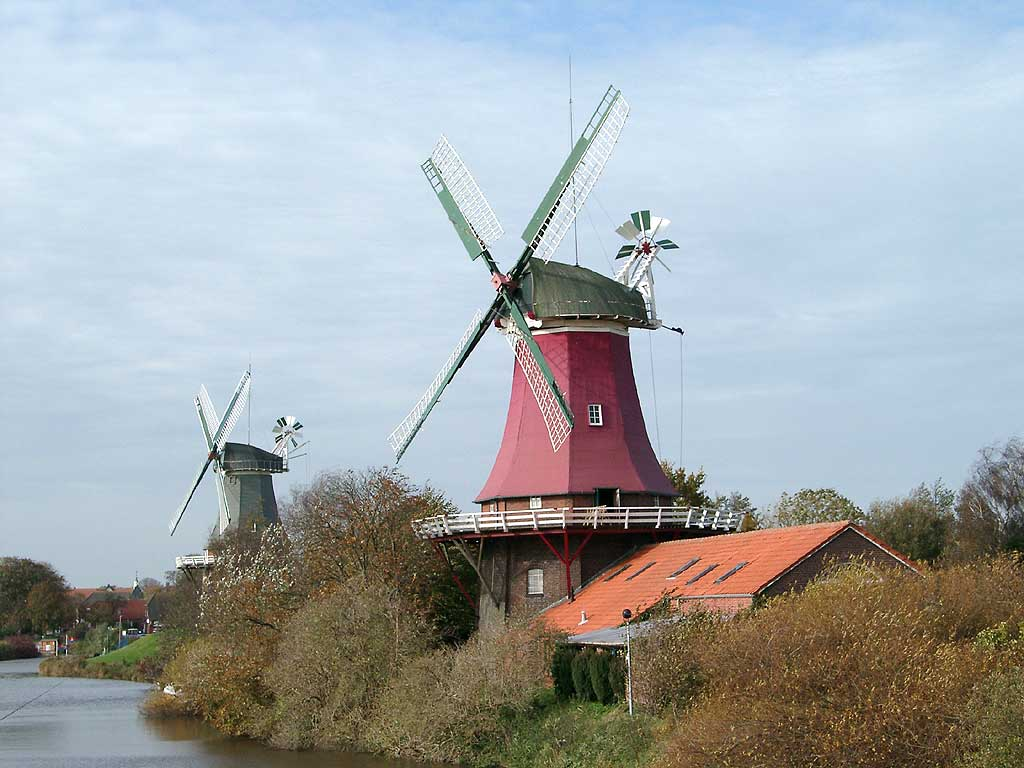
The twin mills, Greetsiel-Ost in front

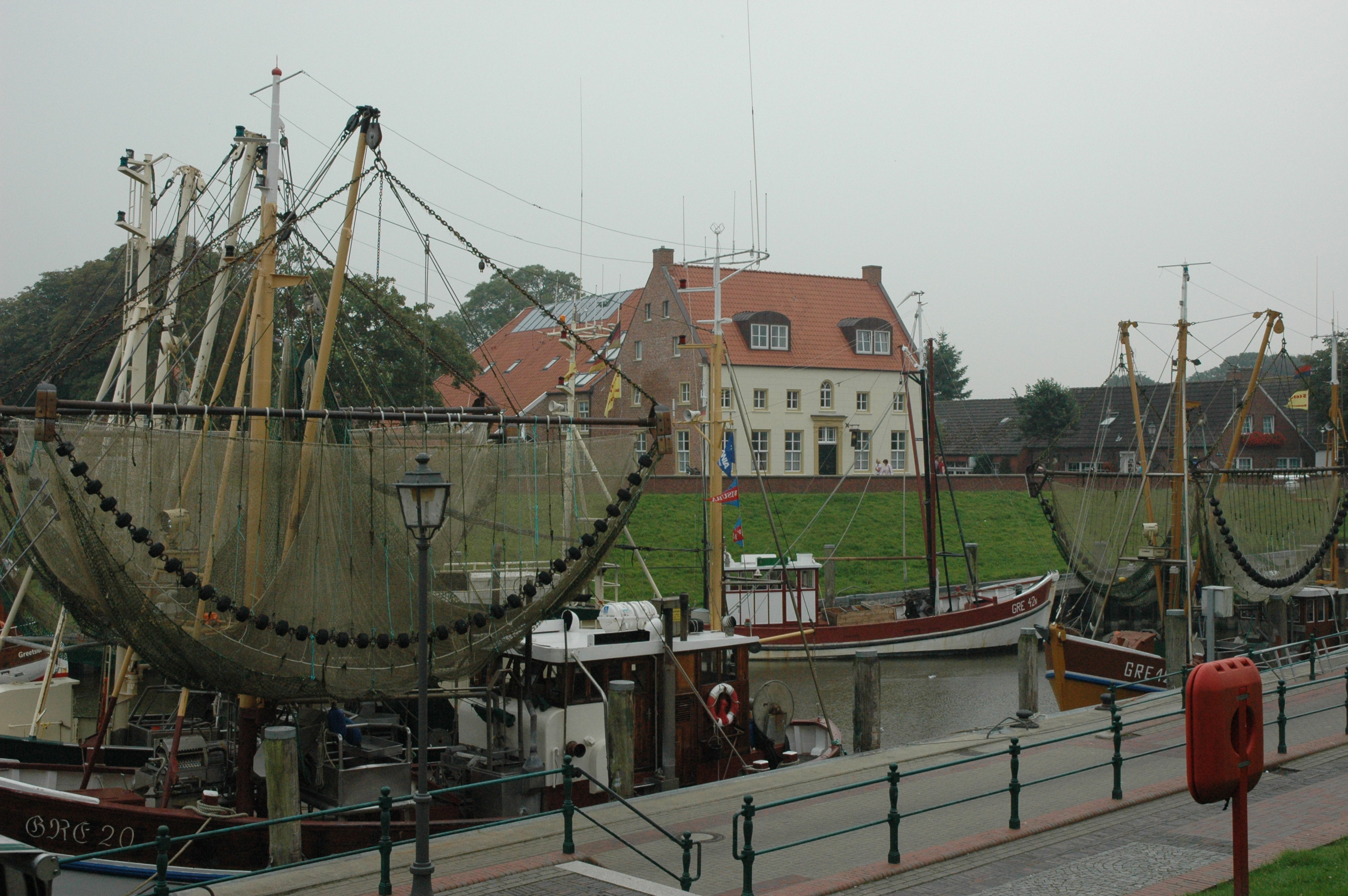
Greetsiel Harbour

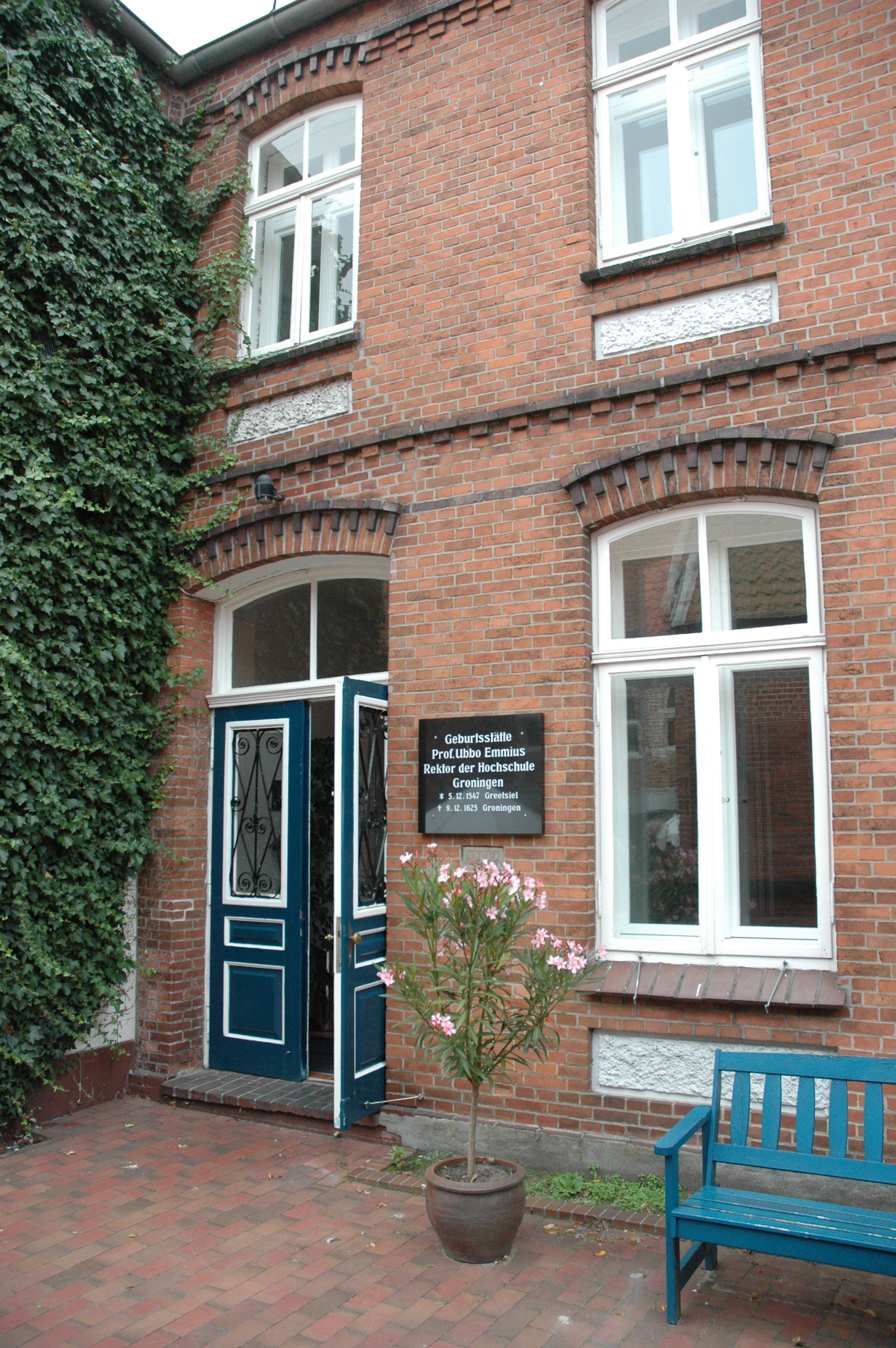
Birthplace of Ubbo Emmius in Greetsiel

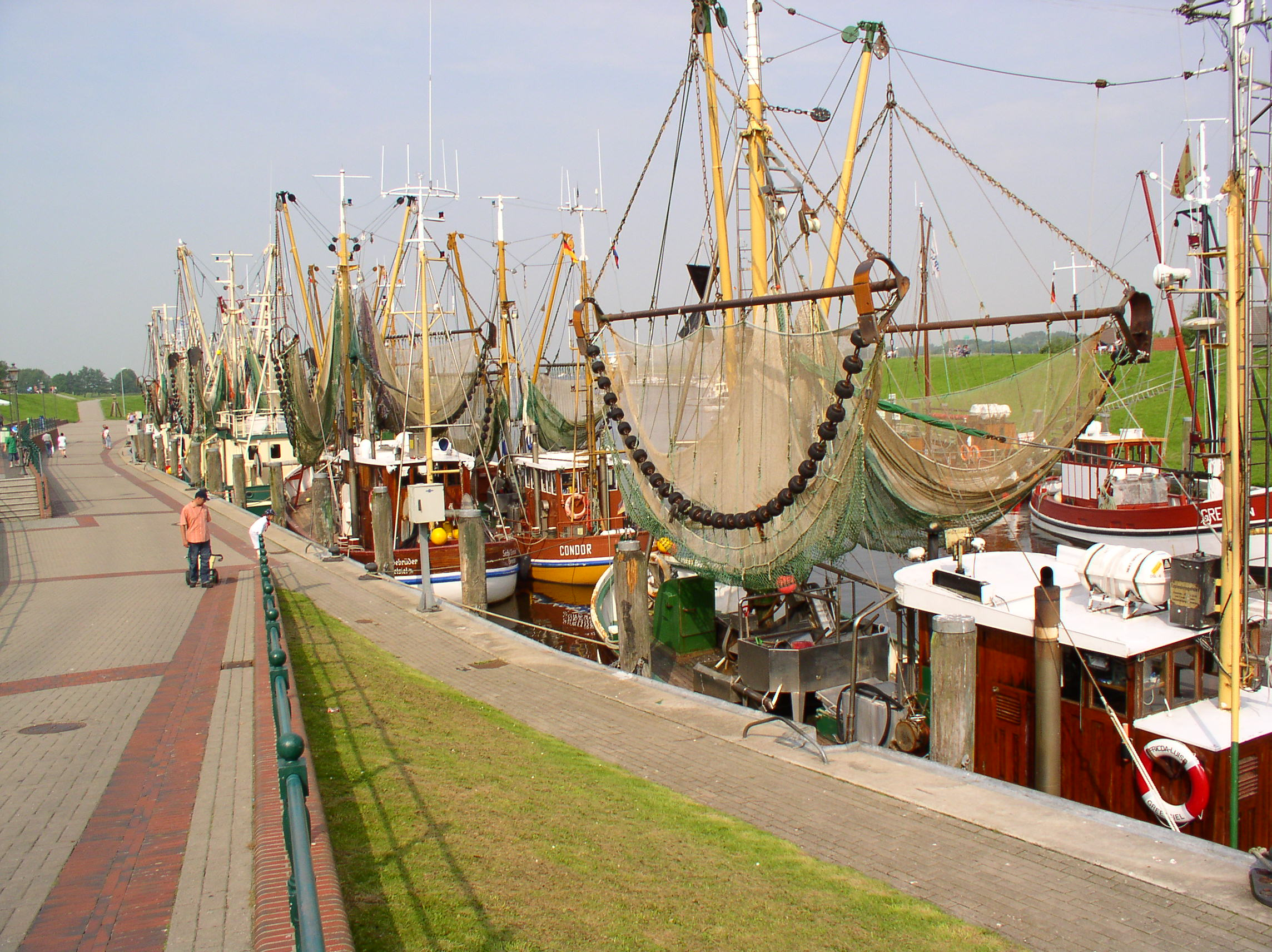
Shrimp cutters in the harbour

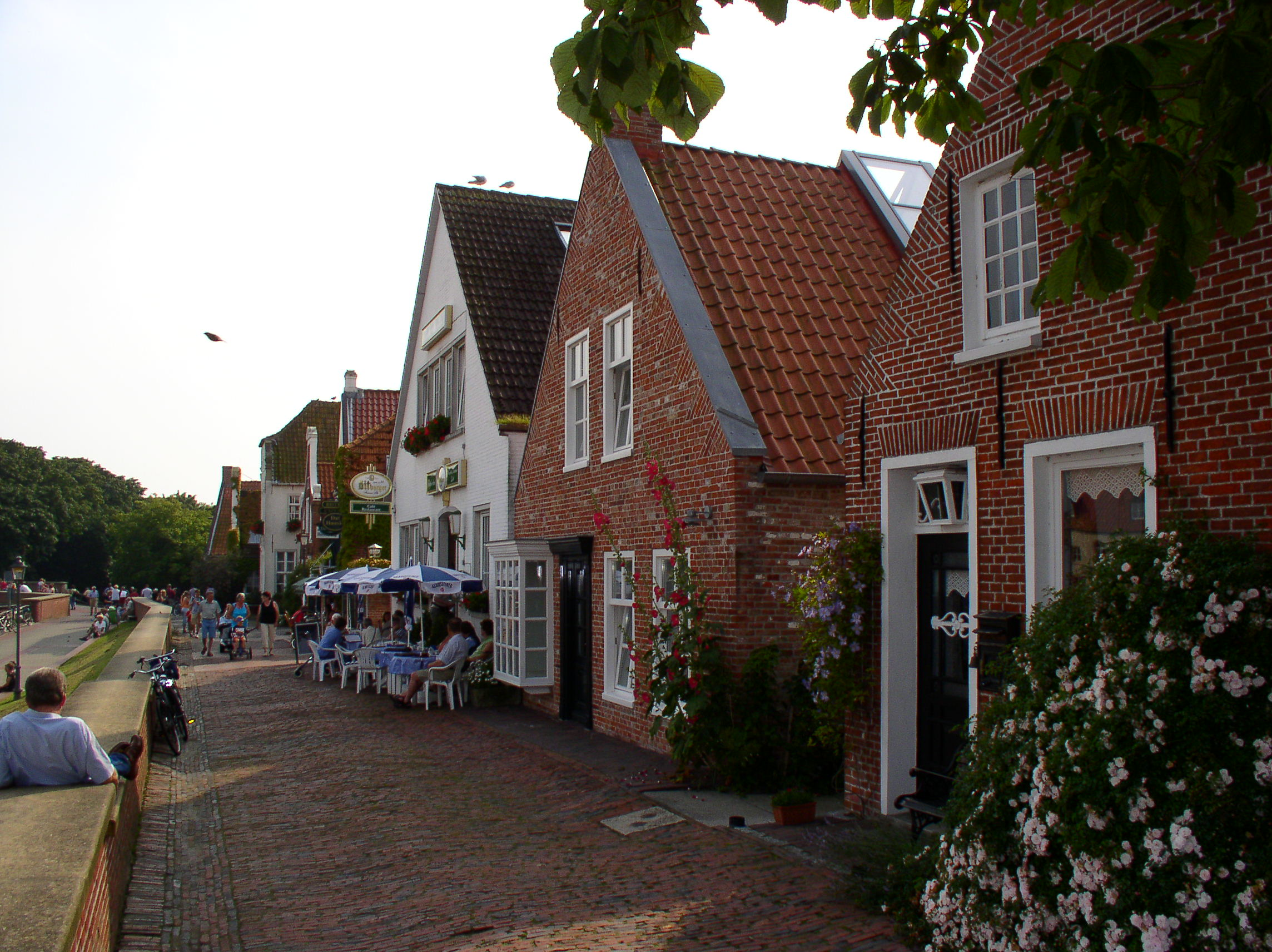
Sielstraße

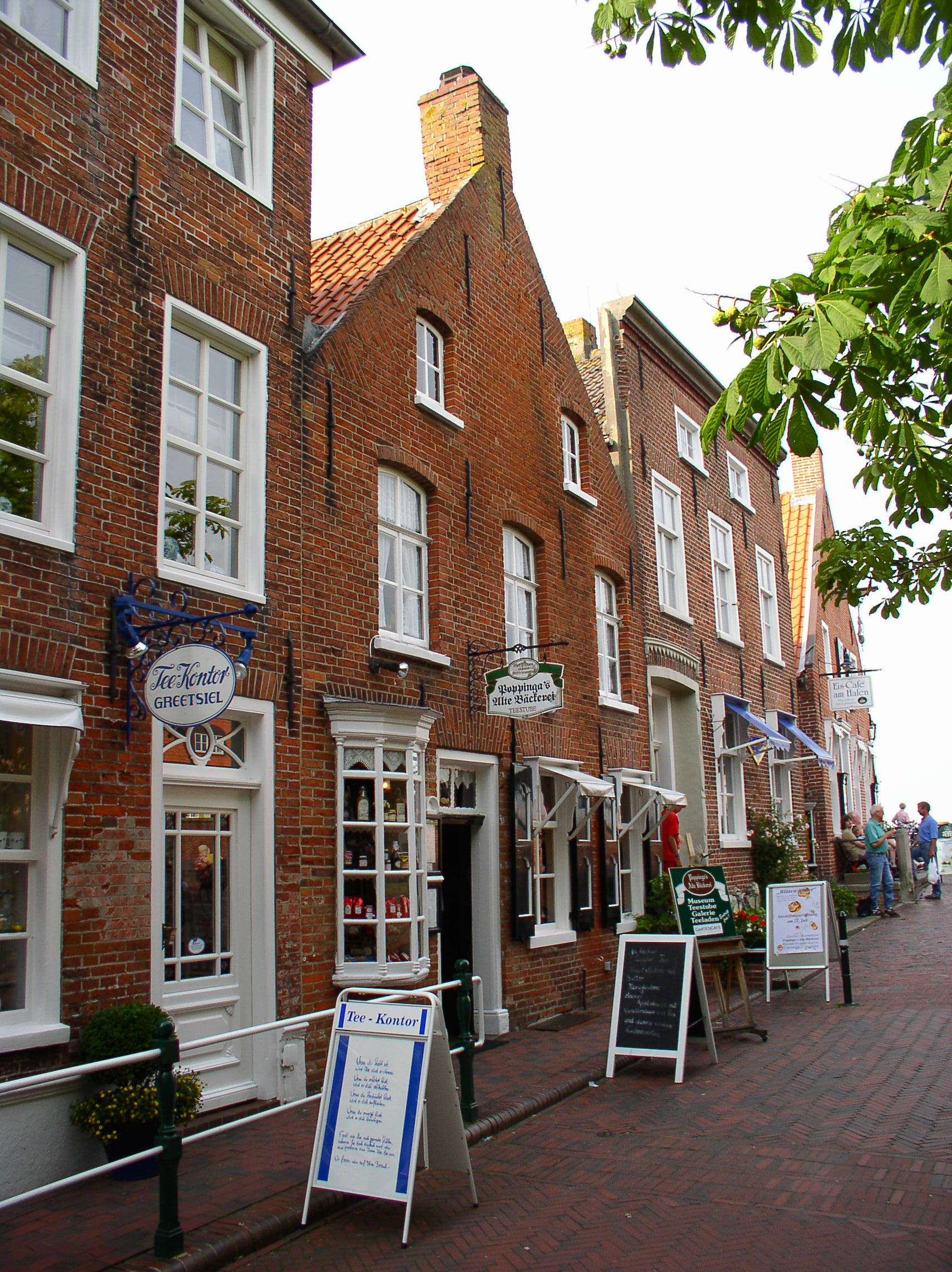
Sielstraße

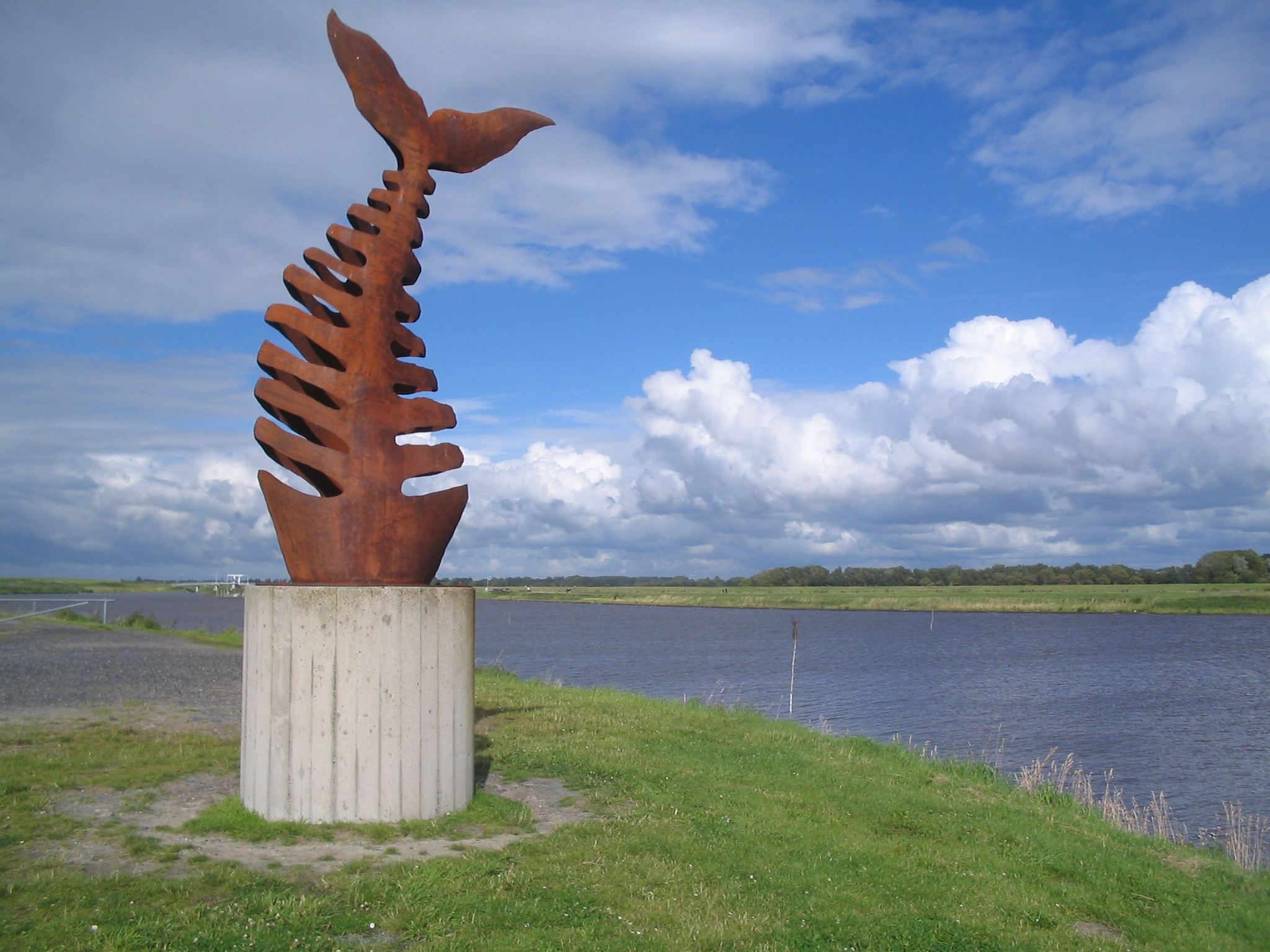
Sculpture at the harbour exit

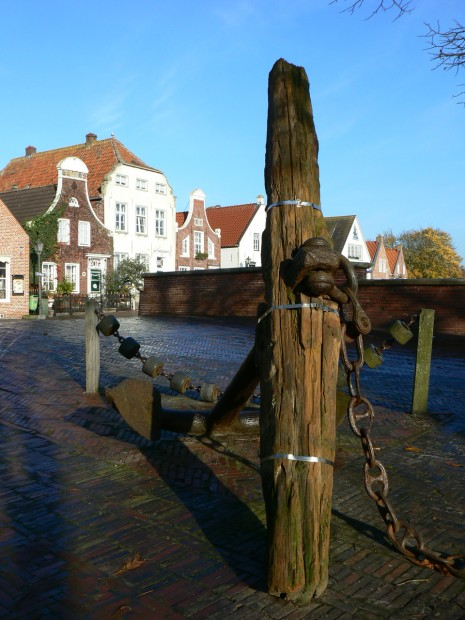
Old anchor

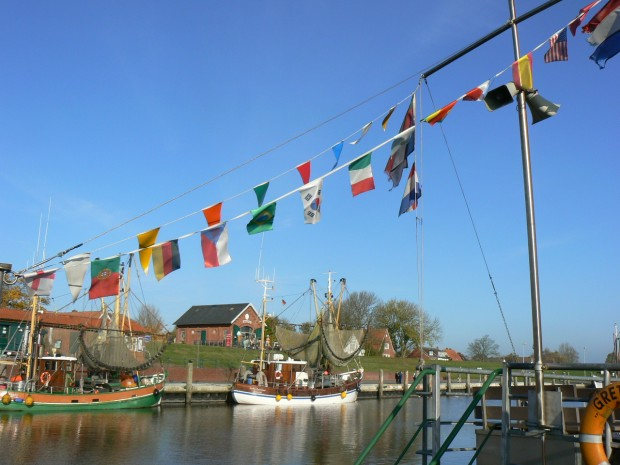
Cutters in the harbour

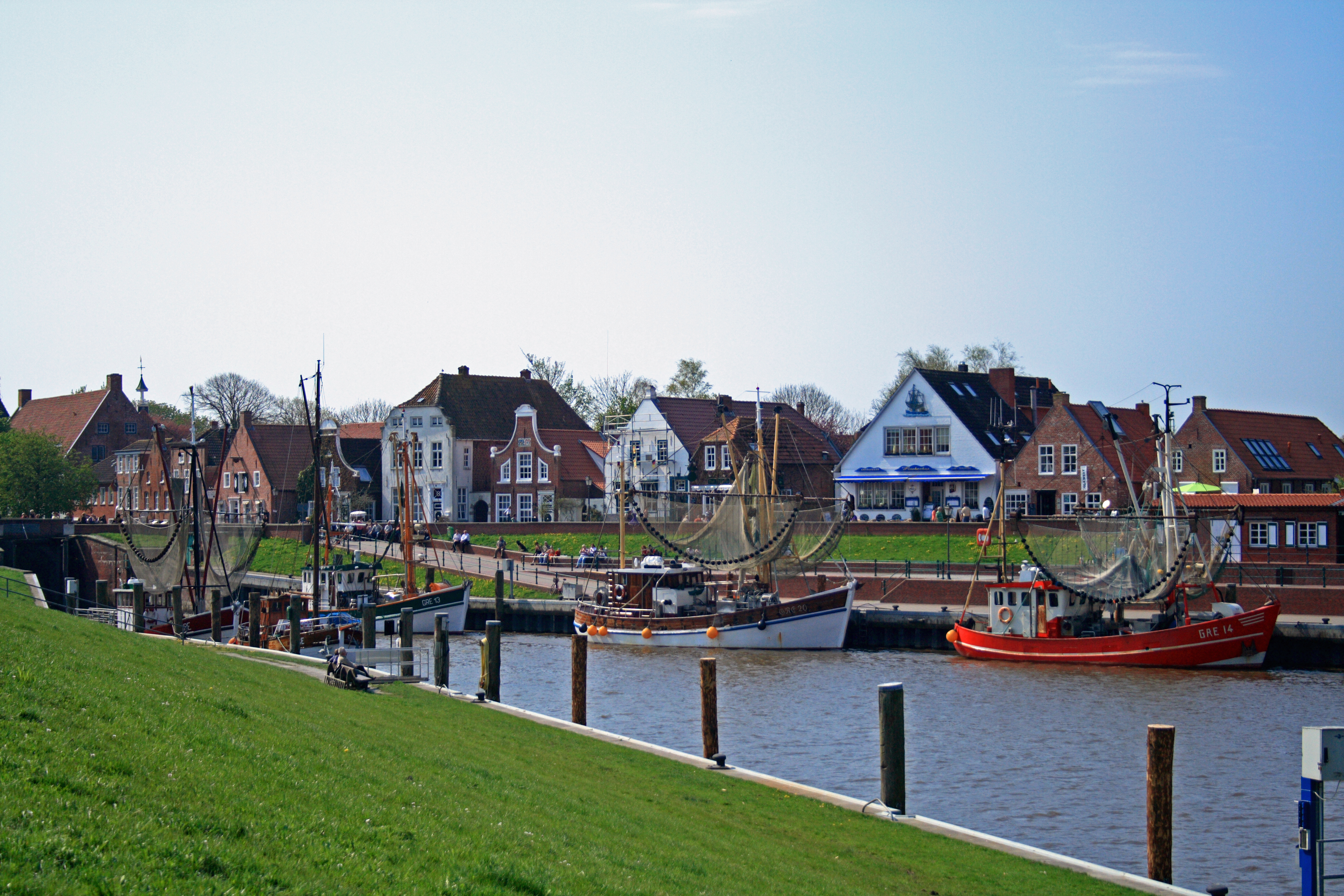
The harbour from Greetsiel

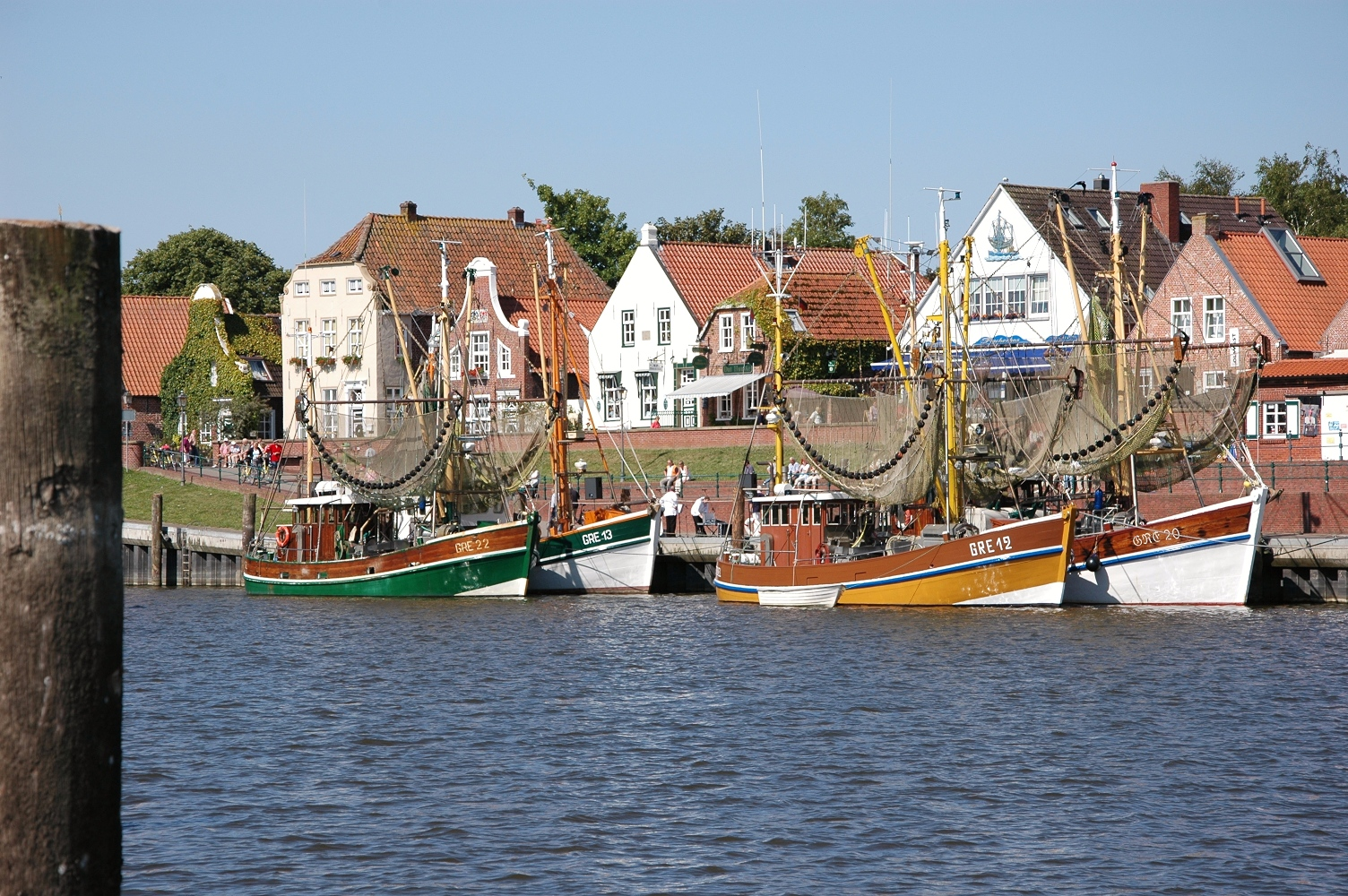
Greetsiel Harbour (2009)

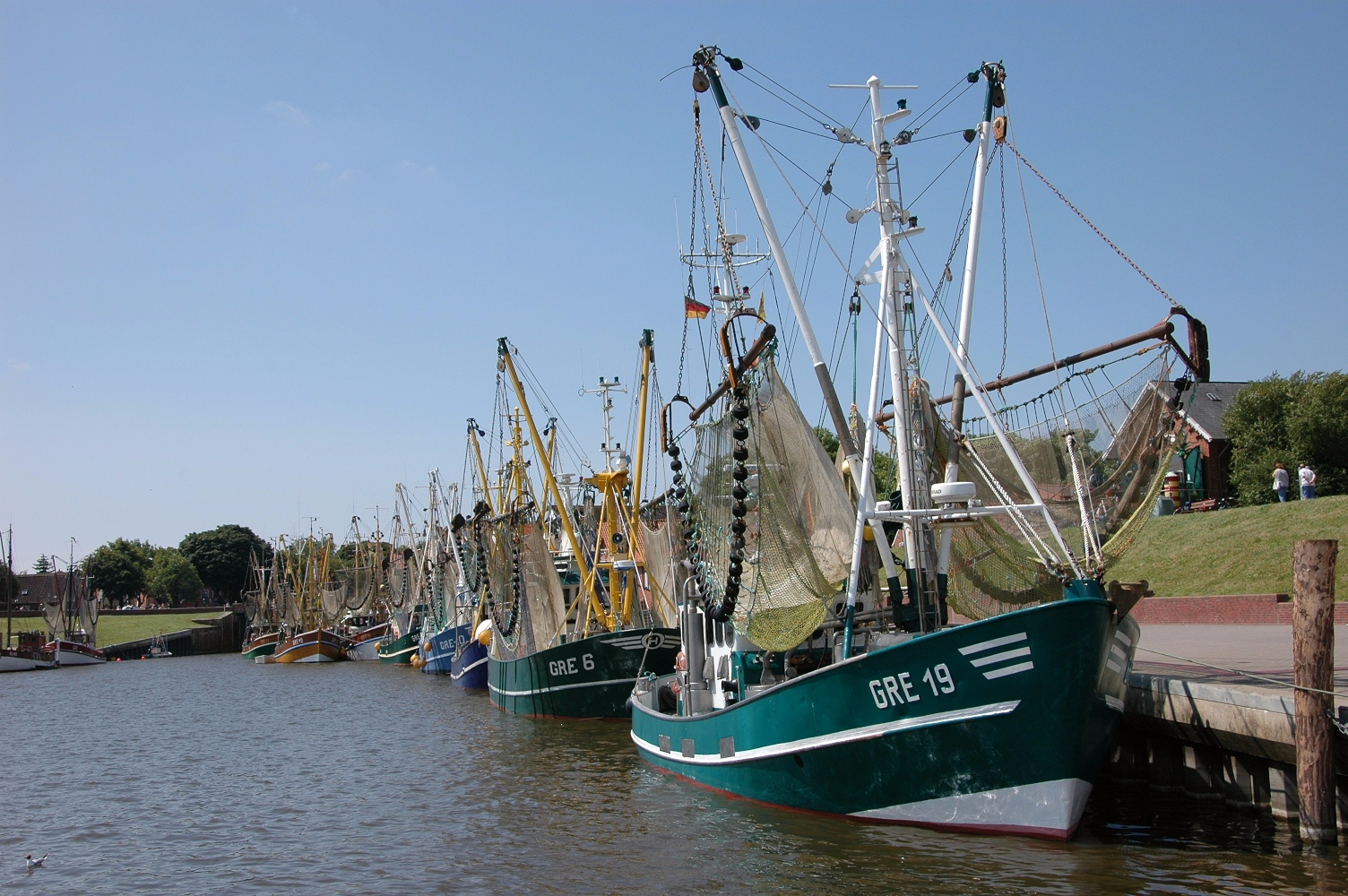
Greetsiel Harbour (2009)

== Notable people ==
- Ubbo Emmius (1547–1625), first rector magnificus of the University of Groningen
