= Leybucht =

Bay in Germany

Coordinates: 53°32′00″N 7°6′00″E

Map of East Frisia

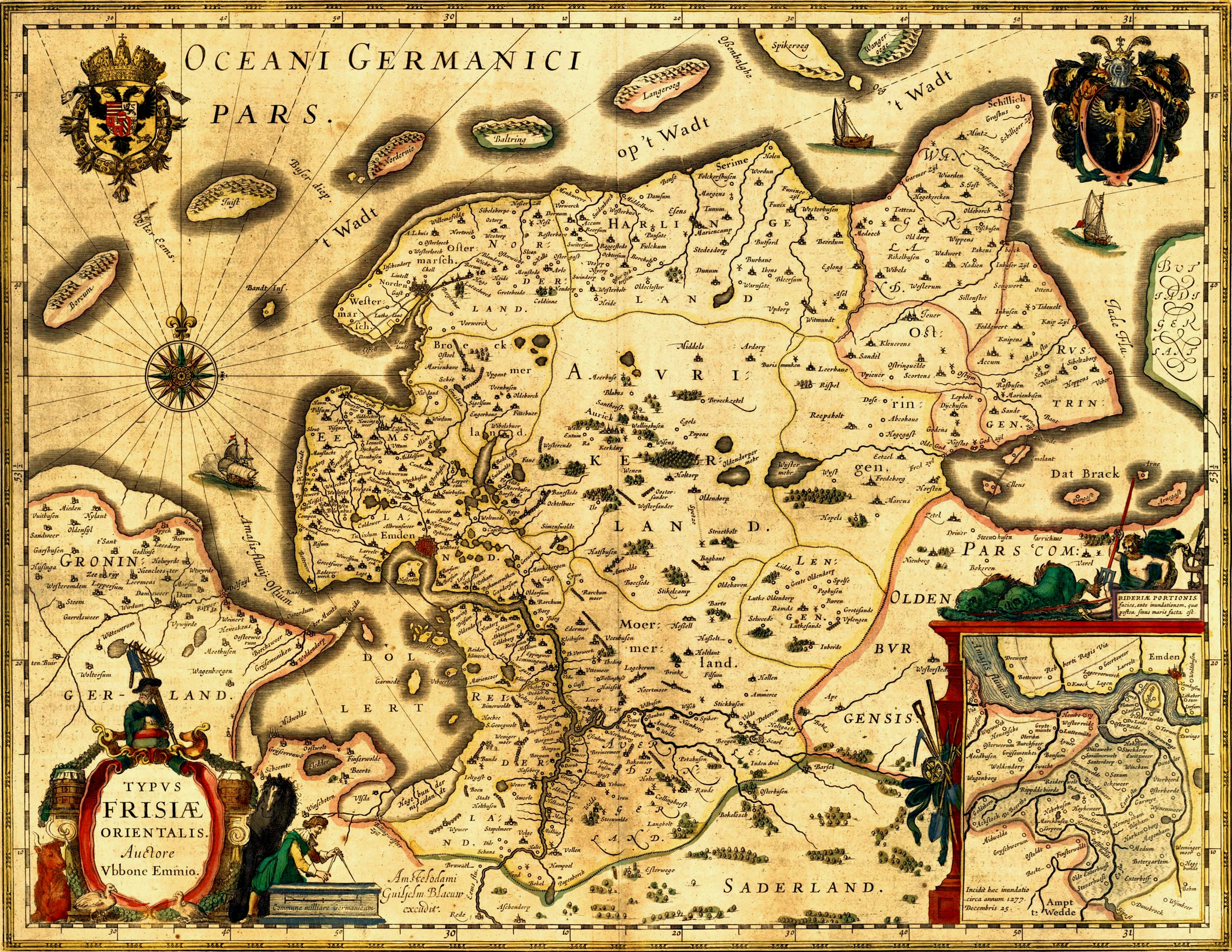
East Frisia around 1600, drawn by Ubbo Emmius

The Leybucht is the second largest bay in East Frisia in northwest Germany after the Dollart. The Jade Bight is larger than both, but belongs historically to Oldenburg.

== Location ==
The Leybucht lies in western East Frisia between the port of Greetsiel and Norddeich, about 18 kilometres north of Emden and 25 kilometres west of the county town of Aurich. It has an area of about 19 km².

== History ==
The Leybucht was formed after the first reliably recorded storm surge along the Dutch coast on 26 December 838. About 2,500 people died in the area of the coast affected by this natural disaster. Following the storm surges of 1374 and 1376 the bay attained its maximum extent with an area of 129 km² and stretched from Greetsiel in the west to Marienhafe in the east and from the edge of the town of Norden as far as Canhusen (in the municipality of Hinte) in the south. In the following centuries, more and more dykes were built to create polders, so that by 1950 the bay had been reduced to its present size. The last land reclamation took place in 1947–1950 with the construction of the Störtebeker dyke, which enclosed the Leybucht Polder and the coast line was straightened. In the following years there were plans to reclaim the entire bay in order to shorten the line of dykes significantly and to improve coastal protection. This measure was eventually rejected on nature conservation grounds.. Only a few, small coastal defence measures were implemented (e. g. the reclamation of the Leyhörn in 1991).

To reinforce the dyke system the first preparations began in 1985 to build the New Störtebeker Dyke (Neue Störtebekerdeichesitungen) which was completed in 2000, and which was laid out in front of the old dyke, the salt marshes in front of it being largely saved.

== Present situation ==
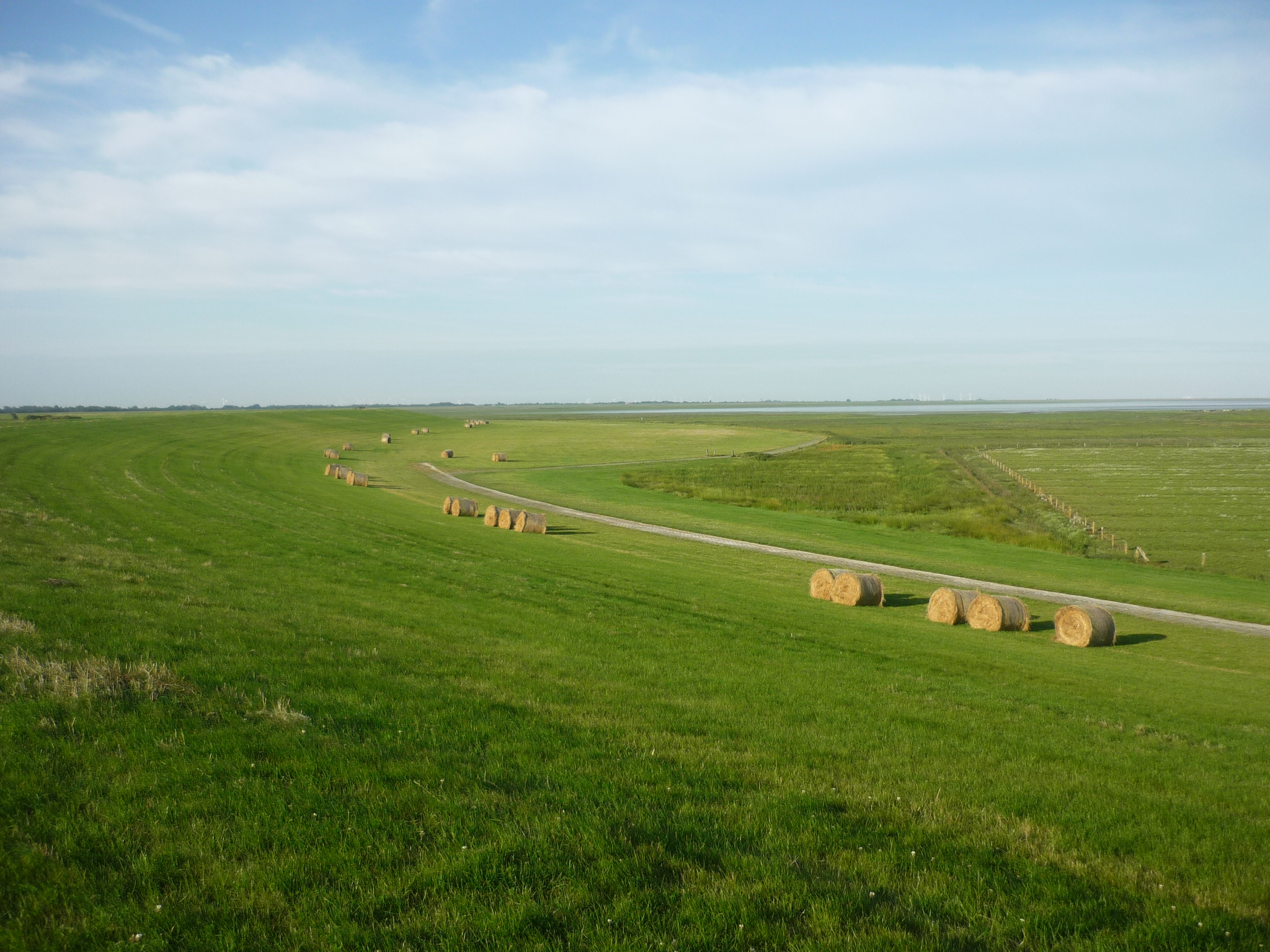
View of the Leybucht

The Leybucht lies in the Lower Saxon Wadden Sea National Park (Nationalpark Niedersächsisches Wattenmeer) and belongs to Zone I. It enjoys special protection, not least because of the fauna and flora of its salt marshes.

The Leybucht Polder was settled in the 1950s and is a village in the borough of Norden.

The most important tourist resort on the Leybucht is the Siel village of Greetsiel.
