= Eugen Boermel =

German sculptor and writer (1858–1932)

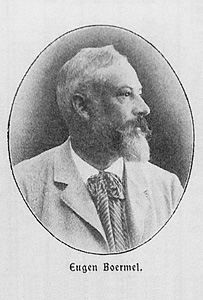
Eugen Boermel (Hohenzollern-Jahrbuch, c. 1901)

Eugen Boermel, also spelled Börmel (27 March 1858 – 24 January 1932) was a German sculptor, writer and inventor.

== Life and work ==
Although Boermel was born in Königsberg, East Prussia, he spent his youth in Berlin. He began his artistic training in 1874, under Eduard Lürssen at the Prussian Academy of Arts, continuing with Albert Wolff and Fritz Schaper. From 1878 to 1879, he attended the Master Class of Reinhold Begas on a state scholarship. Later that year he married, obtained a position in the studios of Otto Lessing and remained there for ten years, exhibiting regularly at the Academy. In 1889, he opened his own studio and soon attracted many large commissions.

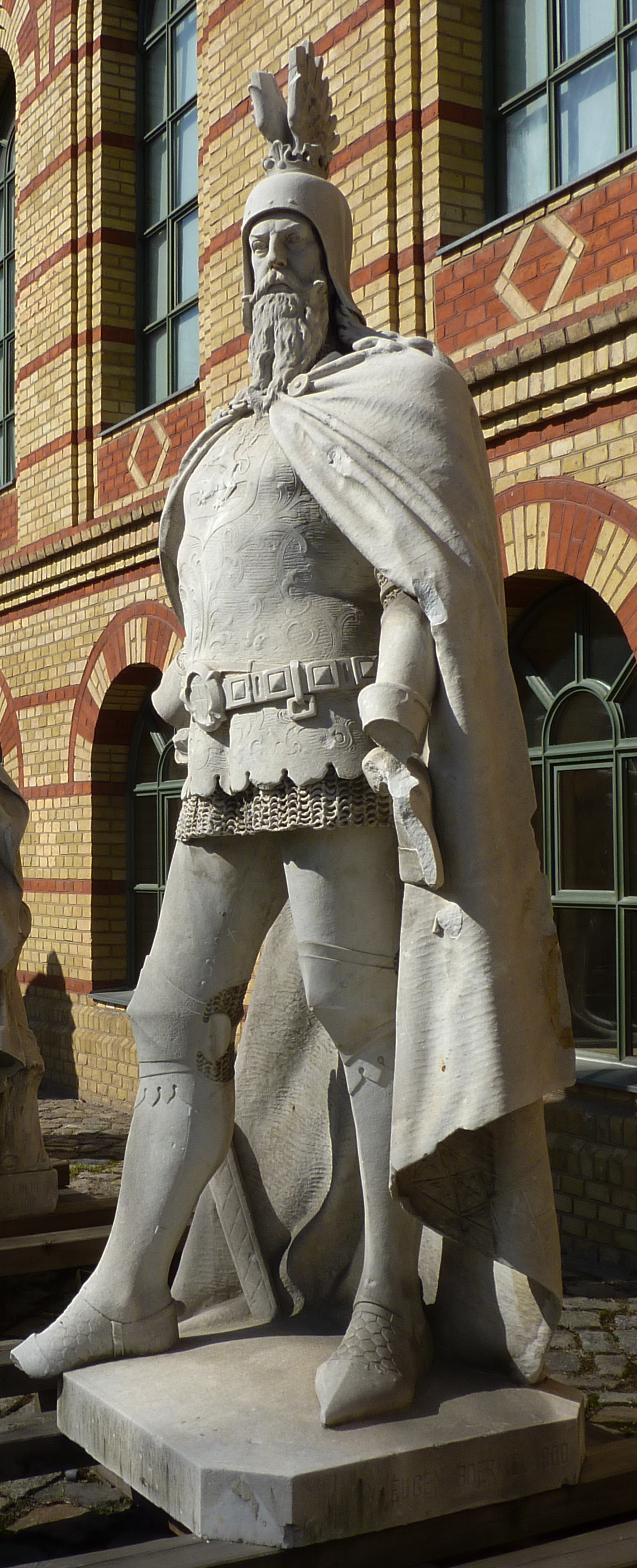
Sigismund, from the Siegesallee

=== Siegesallee ===
In 1896, he was awarded a contract for the monumental Siegesallee (Victory Avenue) project being organized by Kaiser Wilhelm II. This honor was not achieved easily, however, as slanderous letters were directed against him, hateful anti-semitic comments were made about his wife, and a scandal soon developed. The Kaiser directed Reinhold Begas (who was overseeing the selection process) to make sure the proceedings were kept secret.

Eventually, Boermel won approval upon the recommendation of August zu Eulenburg, the Minister of the Royal Houses. He produced Group 14, consisting of Emperor Sigismund of Luxembourg as the center statue, flanked by Lippold von Bredow, the Landeshauptmann of Mittelmark, and Bernd Ryke, who served several terms as Mayor of Berlin in the late Fourteenth and early Fifteenth Centuries. The figures were dedicated on 6 May 1900. Critical reception was devastating, with one commentator labelling them some of the worst on the entire avenue. More thoughtful voices pinpointed the problem as a misguided effort to render smaller designs (typical of his previous work) on a grandiose scale.

In October 1899, several of the early busts were vandalized by critics who derisively referred to the Siegesallee as the "Puppenallee" (Dolls Avenue), an event later referred to as the "Marmorattentat" (Marble Assassination). In response, Boermel designed a device composed of collapsible iron bars with steel tips to protect the statues, but the Kaiser chose to go with heavy iron chains instead. All the figures on the Siegesallee were damaged during World War II and are now on display at the Spandau Citadel.

=== Final years and other activities ===
He was an occasional writer, producing some dramatic works (apparently never published) and essays on subjects such as "The Artist and Public Corporations" and "How is the Further Development of Monumental Statuary Possible?". Technology also attracted his interest and he held several patents related to seismic engineering.

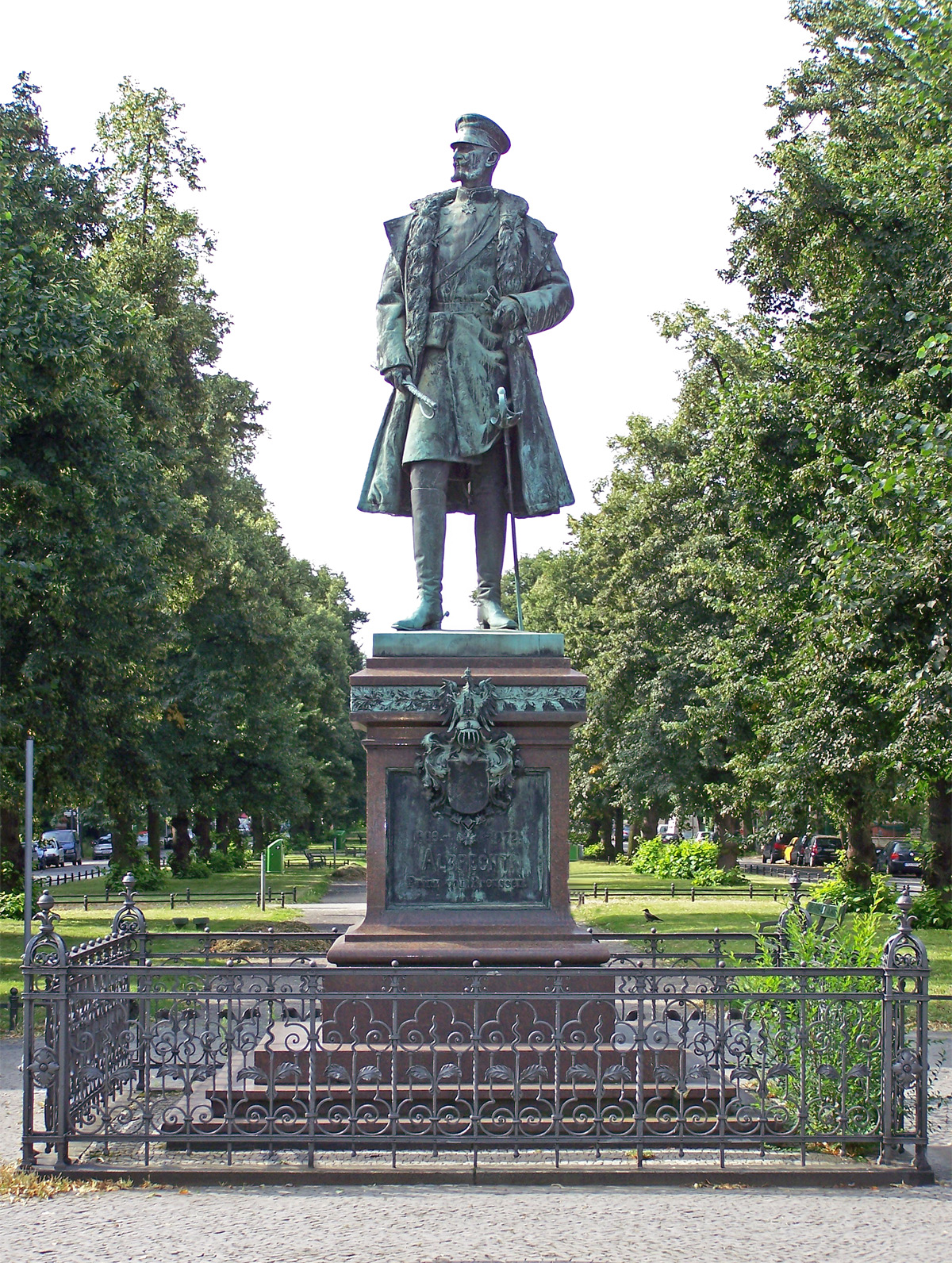
Monument to Prince Albert of Prussia

Little is known for certain about the last twenty years of his life, except that he continued to work from his personal studio in Grünewald. There is much disagreement over whether or not he ever attained the title of "Professor", although he is listed under that title in the official Berlin address book of 1932, the year he died in that city. Some sources indicate that the Kaiser awarded him the Order of the Crown, fourth class, in place of a professorship, others say that he became a Professor in 1904.

== Other selected major projects ==
- 1897 Berlin, "Krieg und Frieden" (War and Peace) figure group for the National Kaiser Wilhelm Monument
- 1901 Berlin, Prince Albert of Prussia Monument
- 1903 Danzig, Equestrian statue of Kaiser Wilhelm I (destroyed by Soviet soldiers in 1945)
- 1908 Augsburg-Göggingen, Monument for Friedrich Hessing, a pioneer in the practice of orthopedic technology, at the Hessing-Klinik
- 1911, Karlsbad, Emperor Franz-Joseph Monument
- 1913 Berlin, Bust of Ernst Viktor von Leyden, at the Charité, Schumannstraße
