= Schneeball =

Schneeball may refer to:

- Schneeball (record label)
- Schneeball (pastry)
- German for Snowball
