= Roter Hahn =

- Native name: Gasthof Roter Hahn
- Industry: Hotel
- Founded: 1380
- Headquarters: Obere Schmiedgasse 21, 91541 Rothenburg ob der Tauber, Germany
- Website: www.roterhahn.com

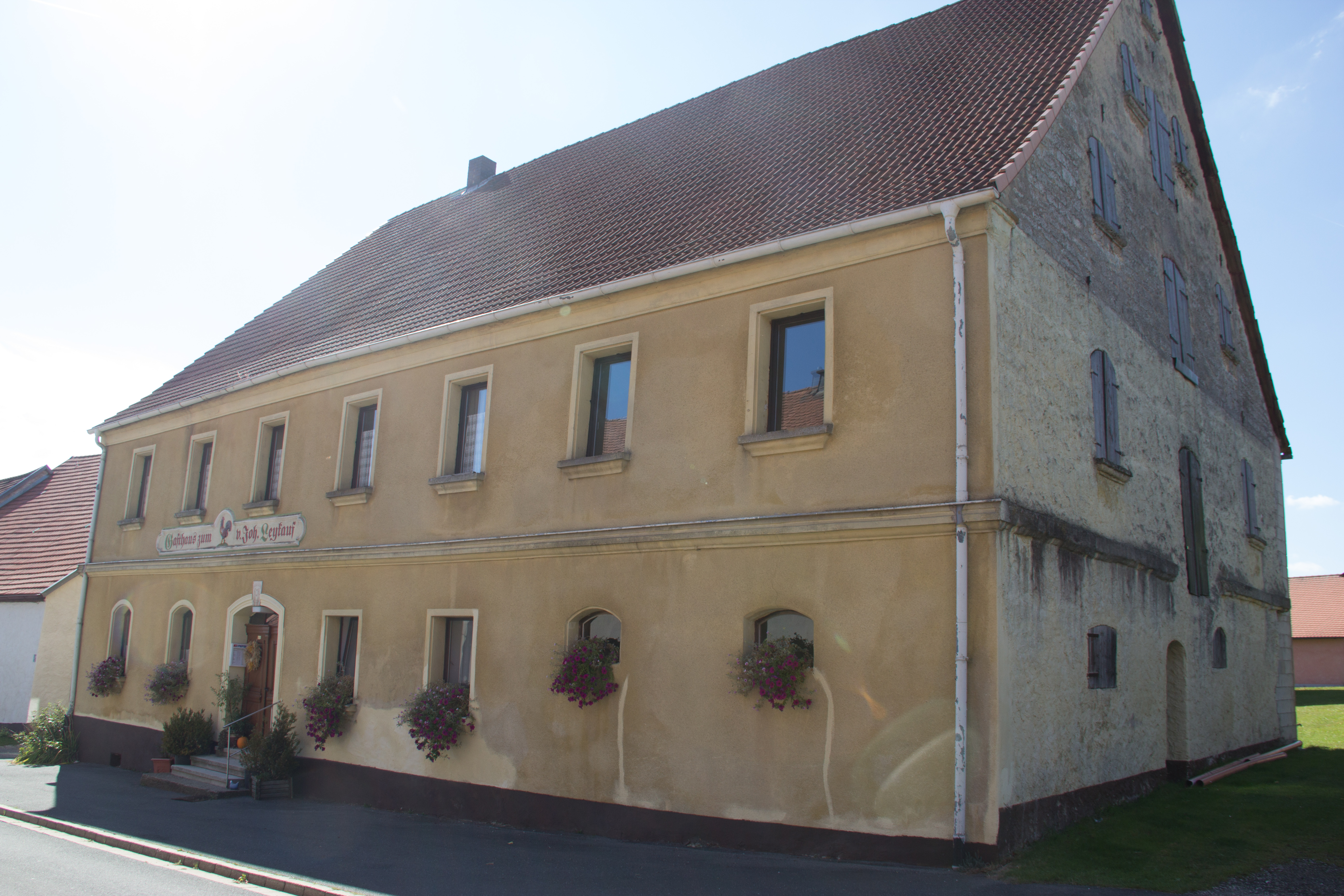
Gasthof Roter Hahn

Roter Hahn is one of the oldest inns in Germany founded in 1380 and located in Rothenburg ob der Tauber, Bavaria.

In 1905 it was purchased by Johann Scherer and his family runs the hotel also today.

== See also ==
- List of oldest companies
