= Altes Brauhaus (Rothenburg ob der Tauber) =

The Altes Brauhaus is an historic building in the centre of Rothenburg ob der Tauber in Bavaria, southern Germany. It was originally a brewery.

== History ==
The "manorial brewery" (herrschaftliches Bräuhaus) was built in 1698 by the magistrate (Magistrat) and opened in the following year; it was redesignated in 1724 as a "free imperial town brewery" (freies reichsstädtischen Bräuhaus). It is located in the town centre, within the historic town walls of Rothenburg, surrounded by town gardens and timber-framed houses, about 3 minutes from the market place. On 13 August 1804, Johann Georg Roth bought the brewery at auction and so it went into private hands for the first time. Since that time, the Bräuhaus has changed hands several times. In 1905, master brewer Josef Beugler, the great grandfather of the present owner, became the proprietor of the brewery.

In 1920, the brewery operation was moved to the steam brewery built by Hans Hopf in front of the Klingentor gate. The Bräuhaus Rothenburg in Wenggasse became the malthouse as part of the new purchase and from then on became known as the Altes Brauhaus. Both businesses (outside the gate and in the town) were united and run as a single brewery under the name Brauhaus Rothenburg.

Today, the cross barrel vaulting (Kreuztonnengewölbe) in the brewhouse is a witness to the times of the "manorial brewery" in the days of imperial town rule. The beamwork of the roof gives an indication of the craftsmanship of master builders in times gone by.

The house in Wenggasse was converted into a hotel in 1984.
