= Removable roof =

Feature of some early modern European fortresses

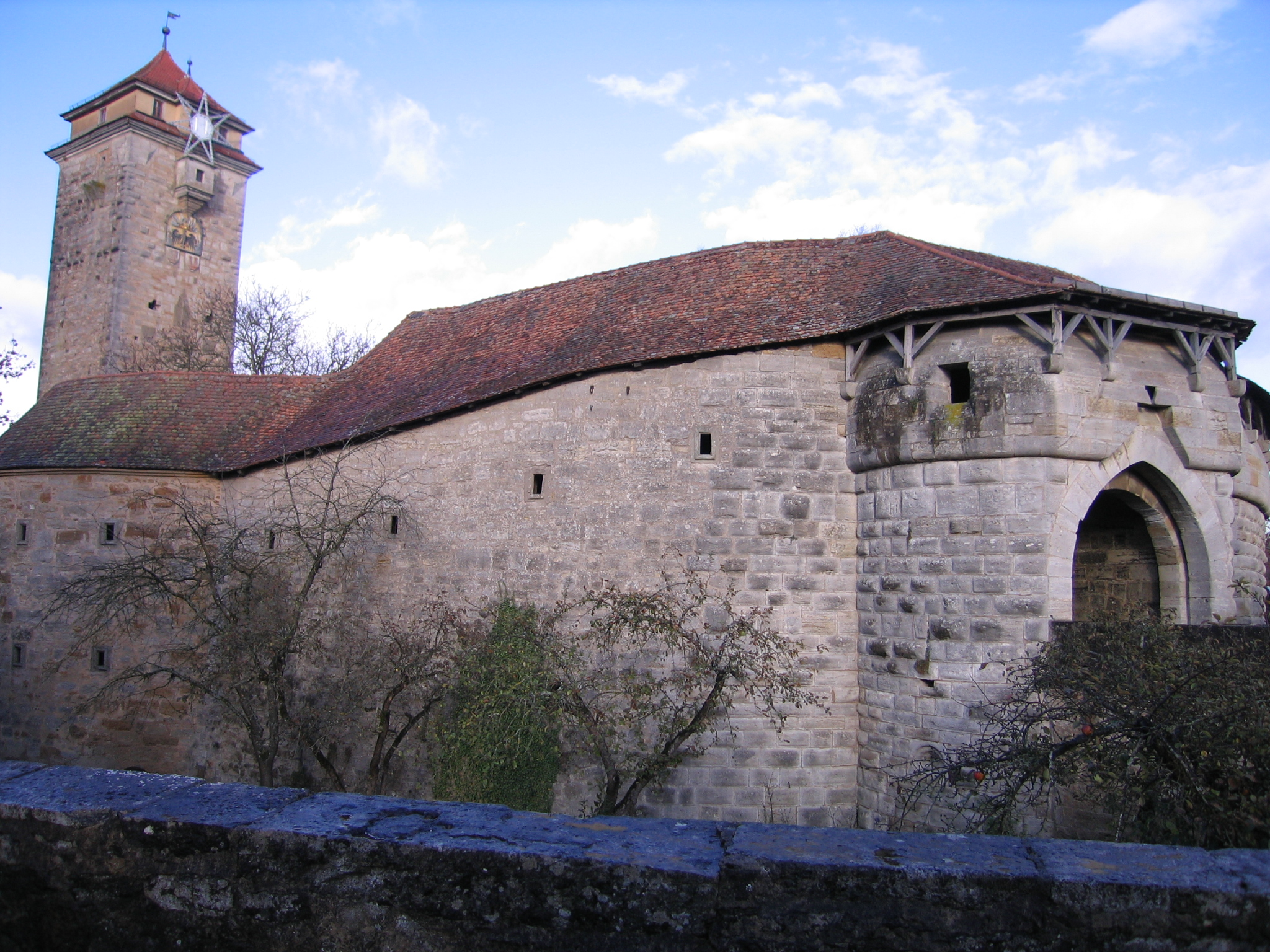
The Spitalbastei in Rothenburg ob der Tauber

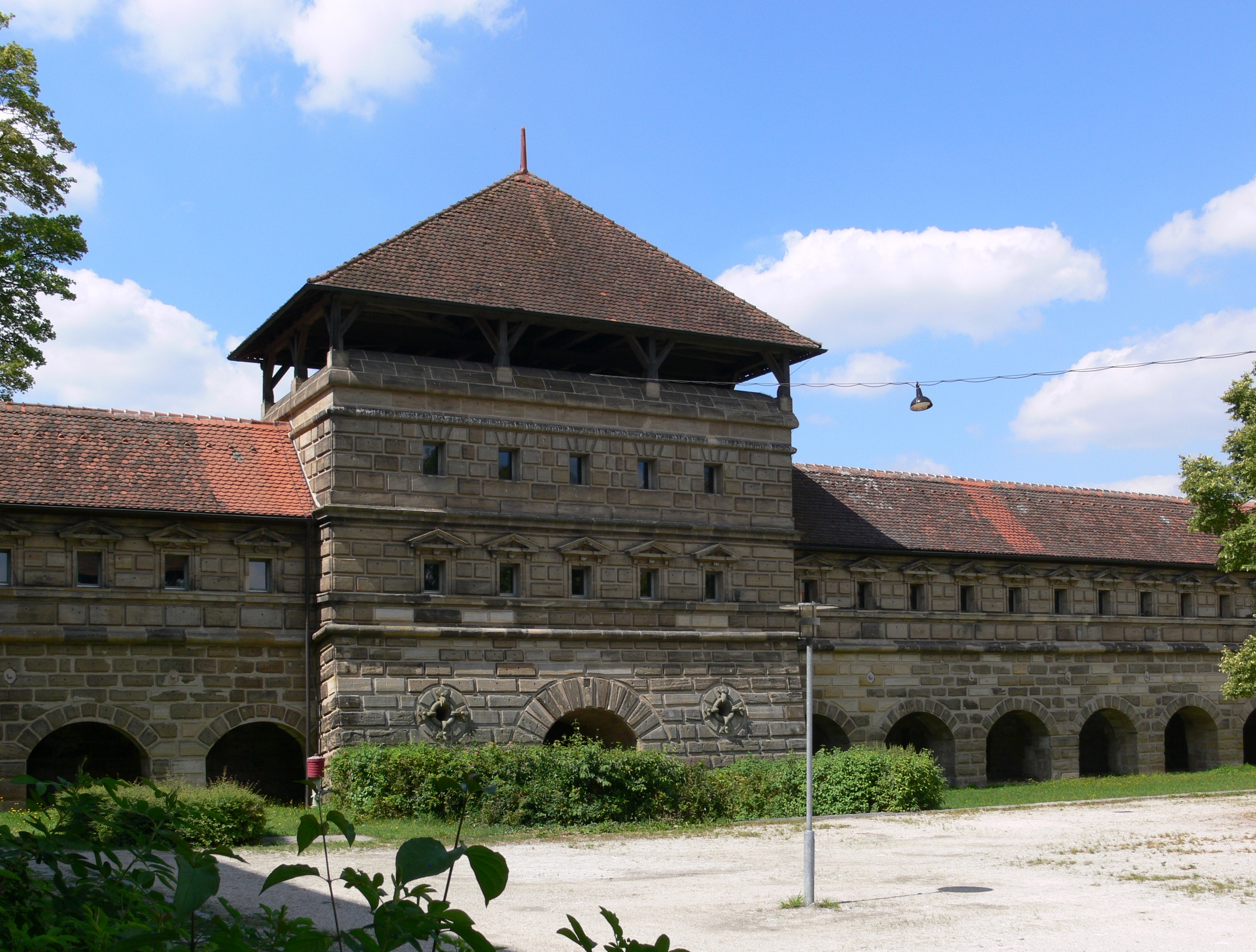
A removable roof on a cavalier of the Middle Franconian fortress of Lichtenau

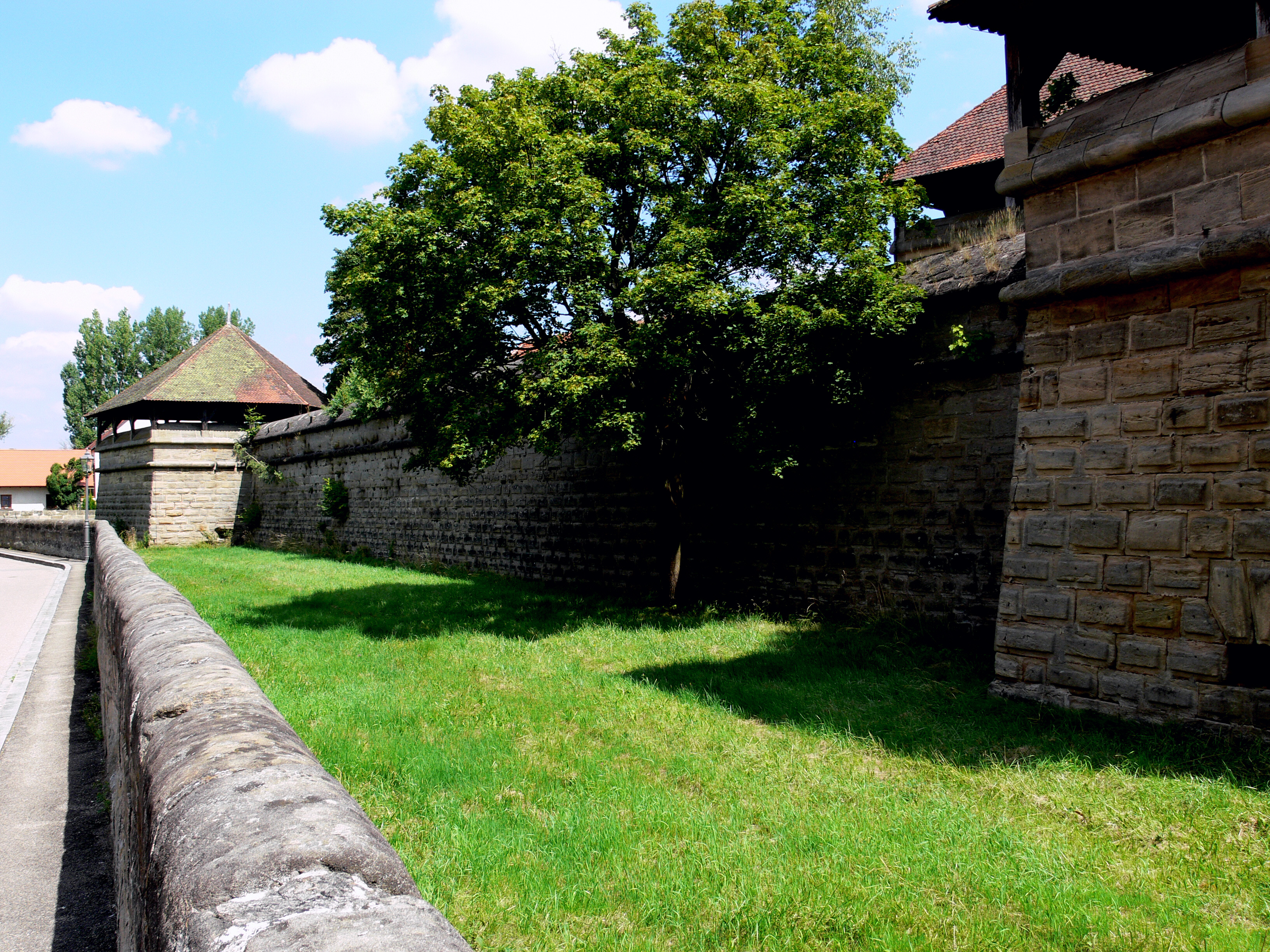
Two bastions with removal roofs. The curtain wall with its roof corbels is dominated by a cavalier (Lichtenau Fortress)

A removable roof (Abwurfdach) was an easily dismantled construction that protected the curtain walls, cavaliers and bastions of several early modern European fortresses. It was once believed that this construction was as old as the 12th century, but most modern historians maintain that the first removable roofs were constructed around 1550.

== Medieval removable roofs ==
In the 19th century architectural historians, such as August Essenwein, developed the idea that, in the 12th century, the main buildings of a castle were universally topped by fighting platforms that were only covered by a "temporary" and easily dismantled protective roof. These temporary structures, known as removable roofs (Abwurfdächer) were supposed to have covered fortifications such as the bergfried as well as residential buildings like the palas and would have been quickly removed in the event of a siege so that catapults could be erected on the fighting terraces in order to defend the castle.

This perspective was already being doubted by castle researcher, Otto Piper, as "something that could be imagined as practical, but which does not always reflect reality." Piper points out, among other things, that there are no medieval sources that speak about removable roofs but several reports of sieges mentioning that enemy shells were destroying the roofs of a castle, accounts which suggest that the castles had more conventional solid roof structures.

More recent castle research also suggests that the majority of the Central European castles were not designed for large-scale sieges, but rather against minor or surprise attacks. Since most castles were not built merely to provide the military function of a fortress, but at the same time were residences of the nobility, provisional roofs are unlikely to have been normal. In addition, hardly anything is known about the roof structures of high medieval castles, since they were generally rebuilt in later times, or have not survived in the case of ruined castles.

== Removable roofs in early modern fortresses ==
From about 1550 onwards, however, there is historical evidence of the actual use of such roof structures in fortifications. In the sphere of influence of the Franconian free imperial city of Nuremberg some removable roofs have survived to the present or been reconstructed. For instance, some cavaliers and bastions at the imperial city fortress of Lichtenau at Ansbach are topped by such constructions. Numerous corbels on the curtain walls indicate the intention to build removable roofs, but contemporary illustrations show that these plans did not come fully to fruition. A bird's eye view at the time of the Thirty Years' War (around 1630, Swedish State Archives) portrays a defensive system with removable roofs on four of the five bastions. The three cavaliers also have correspondingly open superstructures. No roofs can be seen above the curtain walls. This illustration view largely corresponds to the present state of this Renaissance fortress.

In the reconstruction of Nuremberg's city walls, that largely survived until the Second World War, several sections of the wall were re-covered in this way. The posts of the roof trusses also rest on stone columns, which jut out of the wall line (Mauerflucht) or are placed on the cornices.

These Nuremberg forerunners were copied by other Franconian and Swabian imperial cities, for example in the fortifications of Nördlingen and the Spitalbastei bastion of Rothenburg ob der Tauber.

The history of this type of building remains largely unexplored by serious historians. Even in contemporary Italian fortress construction, removable roofs or light roof structures have been documented e.g. at the Fortezza da Basso in Florence. In the sixteenth century, Franconian military engineers leant heavily on Italian innovations.

== Literature ==
- Daniel Burger: Festungen in Bayern. Regensburg, 2008. ISBN 978-37954-1844-1
