= Käthe Wohlfahrt =

German company

Coordinates: 49°22′40″N 10°10′39″E

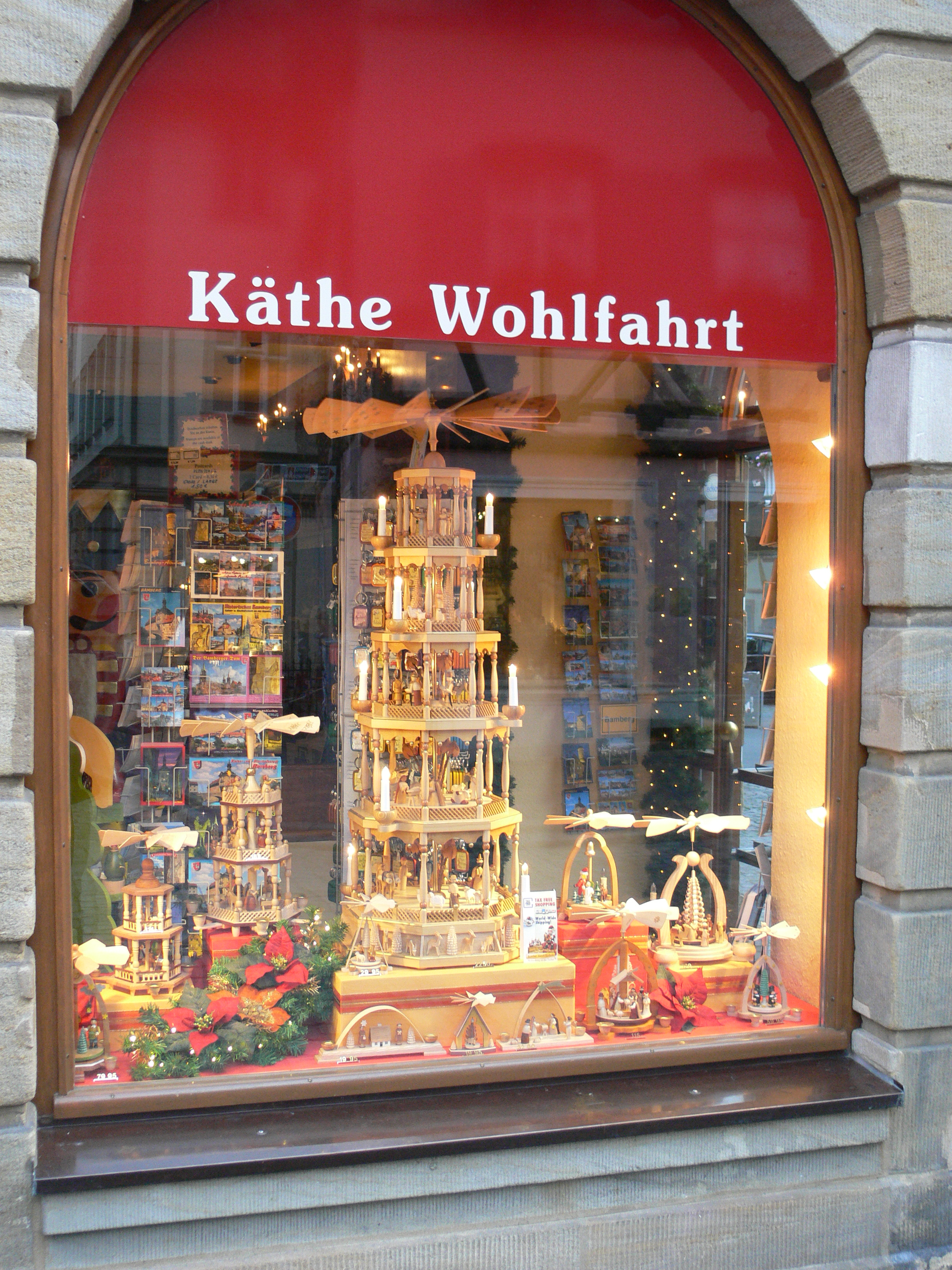
Käthe Wohlfahrt shop in Bamberg, shop window with Christmas items

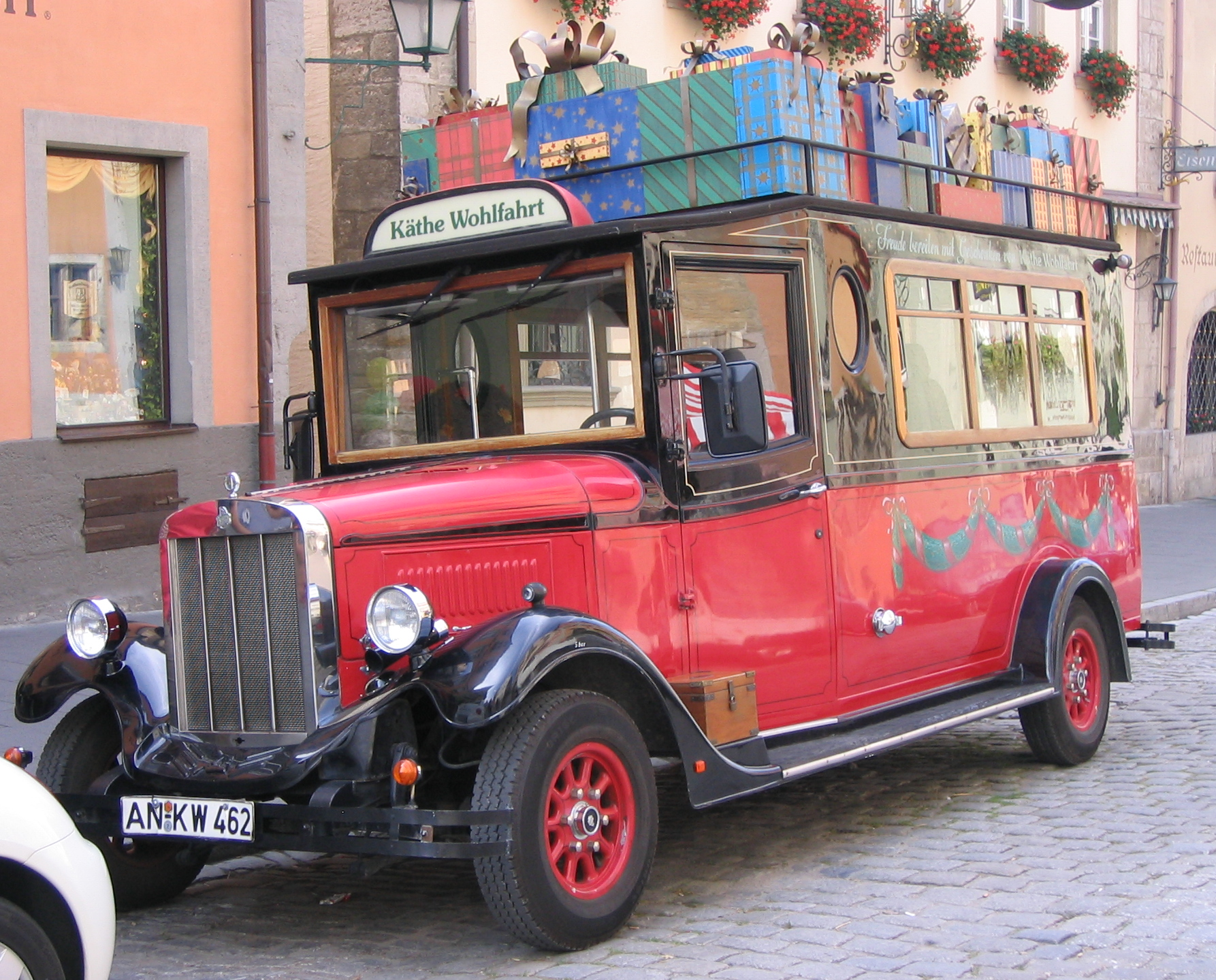
Company vehicle in front of the Christmas Museum in Rothenburg ob der Tauber

Käthe-Wohlfahrt (German pronunciation: [ˌkɛːtə ˈvoːlfaːɐ̯t]) is a German company that sells Christmas decorations and articles. Its head office is in Rothenburg ob der Tauber in Bavaria. According to the tourism site for the state of Bavaria, "the unique Christmas store with more than 30,000 traditional German Christmas decorations ... has attracted millions of tourists from all over the world."

Founded in 1964 in Herrenberg near Stuttgart by the husband and wife couple Wilhelm and Käthe Wohlfahrt, it was taken over by their son, Harald. The firm moved from Herrenberg to the medieval town of Rothenburg ob der Tauber in 1977.

In their main shop in Rothenburg ob der Tauber there is a Christmas Museum and a Christmas exhibition. Amongst its extensive range of products are candles, Christmas tree decorations, nativity scenes and nutcrackers. The shop is open all year long and claims to have the world's largest selection of traditional German Christmas ornaments.

The firm has a chain of shops in Nuremberg, Bamberg, Oberammergau, Berlin, Heidelberg, and Rüdesheim am Rhein. In addition there are branches in Riquewihr in France, in Bruges in Belgium, in Barcelona in Spain, on Stonegate in York in the United Kingdom, and in Stillwater, Minnesota, United States. It also runs stalls at Christmas markets.

In addition to the Stillwater store in the United States, Kathe Wohlfahrt of America also has seasonal stores at Christmas markets in Arlington, Texas; Baltimore, Maryland; Bethlehem, Pennsylvania; Pittsburgh, Pennsylvania; Tyson Corner, Virginia; Chicago, Illinois; Milwaukee, Wisconsin; and Philadelphia, Pennsylvania, as well as a Canadian location in Vancouver.

The company is very well known outside the German-speaking region. Its parent company in Rothenburg ob der Tauber is a destination for many tourists from Japan and the United States and a visit to Käthe-Wohlfahrt is often included as part of their Germany or European tours.
