= Georg Nusch =

Bavarian politician

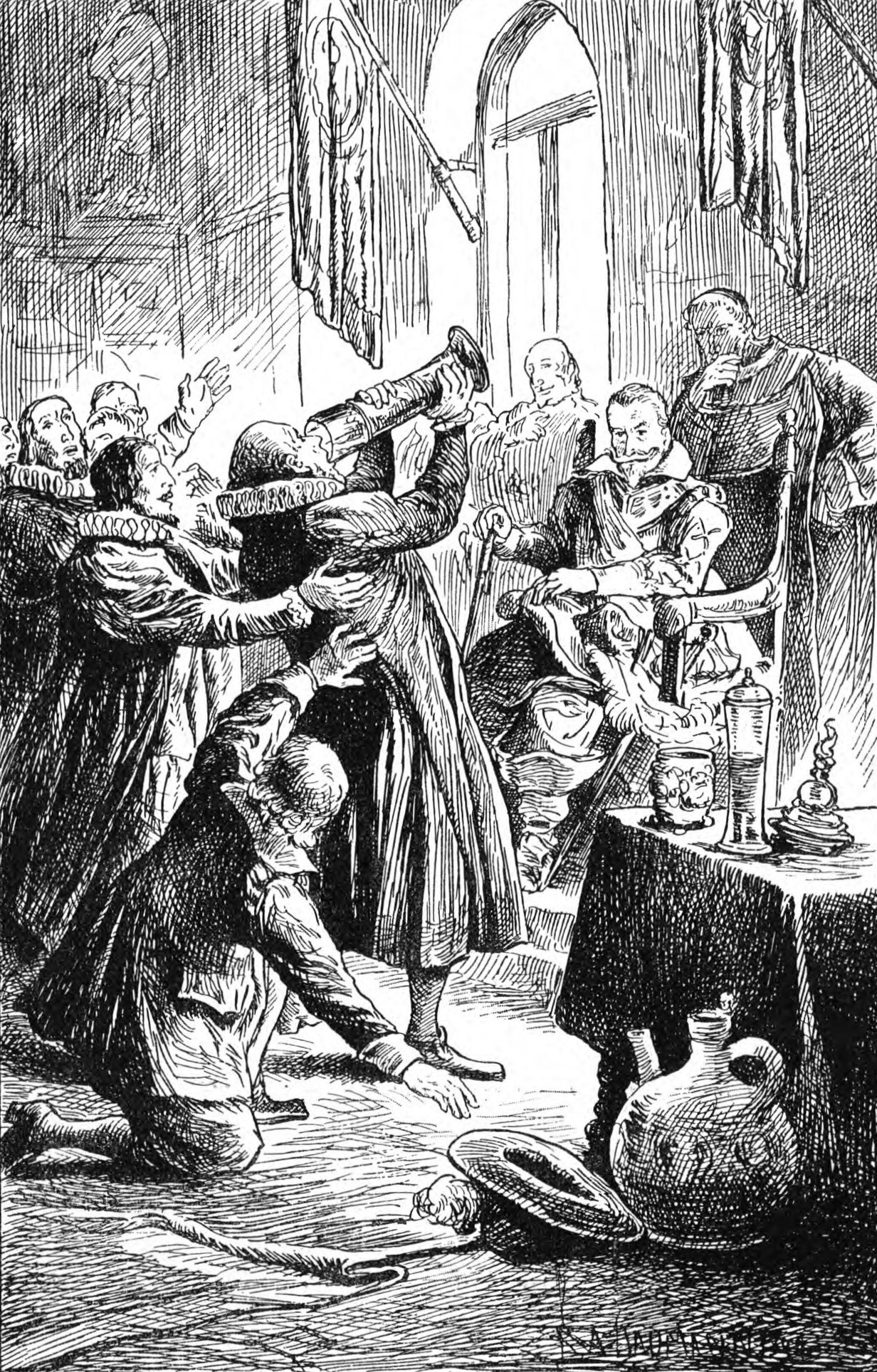

Georg Nusch (8 January 1588 in Rothenburg ob der Tauber - 8 January 1668 Rothenburg ob der Tauber) was a Bavarian politician. He was born to a patrician family of Rothenburg ob der Tauber, in Bavaria's Franconia region. He was the city's mayor in 1631 when Johann Tserclaes, Count of Tilly and the imperial army besieged the city during the 30 Years' War.

Nusch lived in the so-called "Jaxtheimer", opposite the Rothenburg town hall, in today's Marienapotheke. His birthplace was the wine business "Zum Roten Hahn" which is a hotel today.

== Portrayal in fiction ==
In the play Der Meistertrunk, a piece by Adam Hörber which debuted in 1881, the meeting between Mayor Nusch and Tilly supposedly happened as follows: Tilly condemned the city councilmen to death and wanted to burn the city. In their distress, the councilors presented him a welcome drink in a splendid colored glass cup, which held 3 1/4 liters of wine. Tilly was appeased by this and said that if someone could drink this cup full of wine in one go, he would spare the city. Nusch volunteered, and to everyone's astonishment he succeeded in emptying the cup. Tilly was so impressed that he spared the city.
