= Franciscan Friary, Rothenburg ob der Tauber =

Franciscan Friary of Rothenburg ob der Tauber
- Franziskanerkloster Rothenburg ob der Tauber
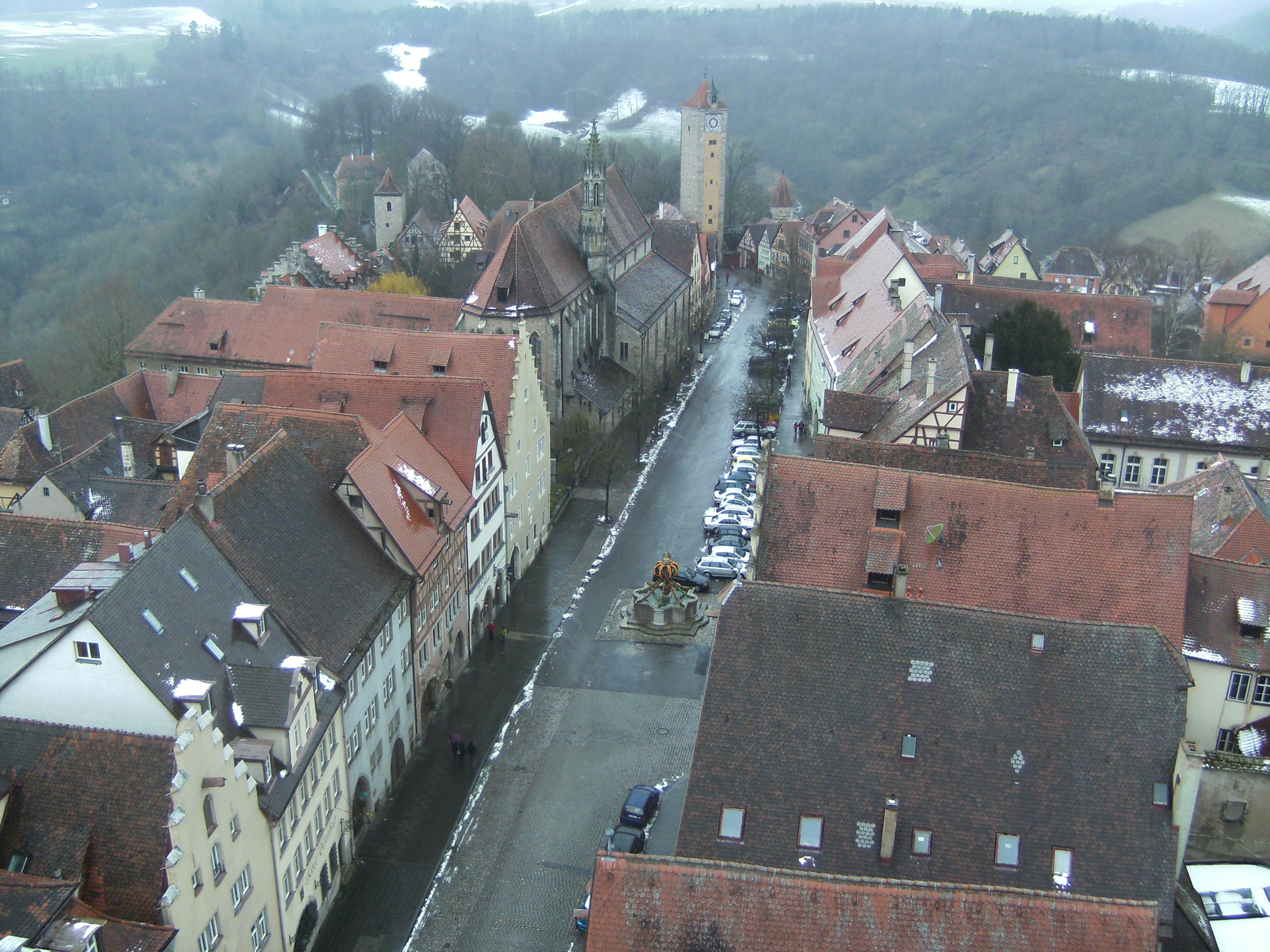
- View of the Franciscan church from the town hall
- Franciscan Friary of Rothenburg ob der Tauber
- 49.376667°N 10.176389°E
- Location: Rothenburg ob der Tauber, Bavaria
- Country: Germany
- Denomination: Lutheran
- Previous denomination: Roman Catholic

Architecture
- Style: Gothic

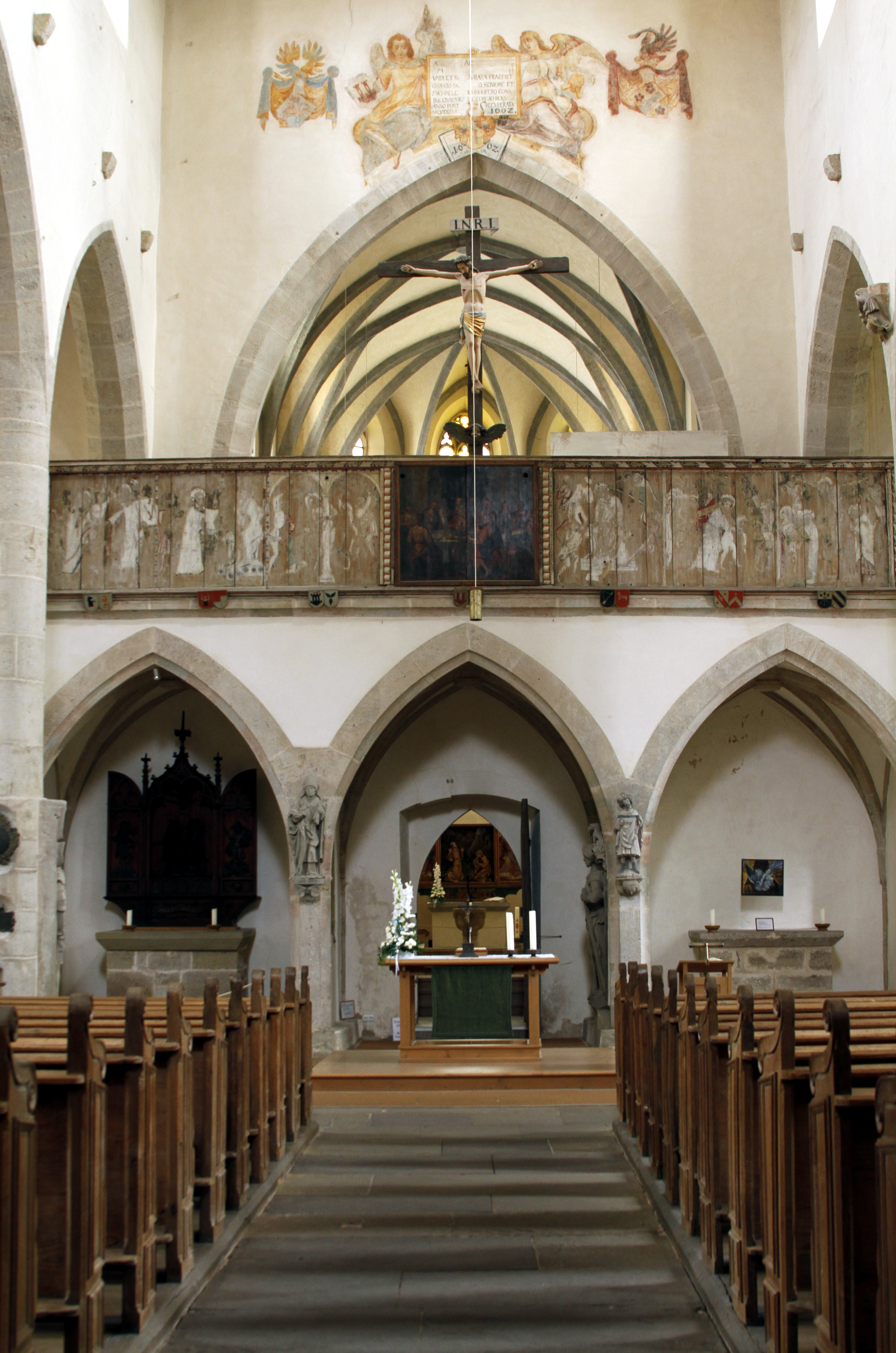
View of the rood screen

The Franciscan Friary of Rothenburg ob der Tauber (German: Franziskanerkloster Rothenburg o.d. Tauber) is a former friary of the Conventual Franciscans in the town of Rothenburg ob der Tauber in Bavaria in the diocese of Bamberg. Nowadays the former Franciscan church is an Evangelical Lutheran parish church.

== History ==
The friary, dedicated to the Virgin Mary, was founded in 1281 by Hermann von Hornburg, Schultheiß of Rothenburg, and others, but was not consecrated until 1309. It was wound up in 1548 in the wake of the Reformation.

The buildings of the friary, vacated voluntarily, were used initially for the establishment of a grammar school, later as a home for the widows of priests. In 1805 the building became, among other things, a salt store. Parts of the premises (cloisters, refectory, etc.) were demolished; many of the contents were destroyed or sold, including the Wiblinger Altar by Tilman Riemenschneider.

In spite of the losses and damages of the past the church today is a significant example of the church of a mendicant order, with a rood screen and important art treasures.

== Graves and Tombs ==
Following the Thirty Years' War, Rothenburg was struck by a plague that killed more than two thousand people in three months. Many of those that died were buried in the friary's graveyard. Many families owned tombs at the friary. Some of these families were the Berlichingens, Beulndorfs, Brettheims, Hornburgs, and Kreglings. The tomb of Swedish officer Perkhöffer is also located here. These names and others can be found on the many epithets on the friary walls.

== Miscellaneous Information ==
- The altarpiece Passion by Riemenschneider was likely originally meant to be the high altar of the friary. Certain sculptural details indicate that Martin Schwartz, the guardian of the friary (1485–1506), helped to create Passion.
- The friary is Rothenburg's oldest church.
- The friary was built in the early Gothic style.
- The Franciscan Friary is also known as the Franciscan Church, Franciscan Monastery, and Franziskanerkirche.
- Late 19th century journalist Katharine S. Macquoid described the friary as beautiful despite its disrepair, while considering the nearby St. Jacob's Church to be bland and uninteresting.
