= Friedrich Hessing =

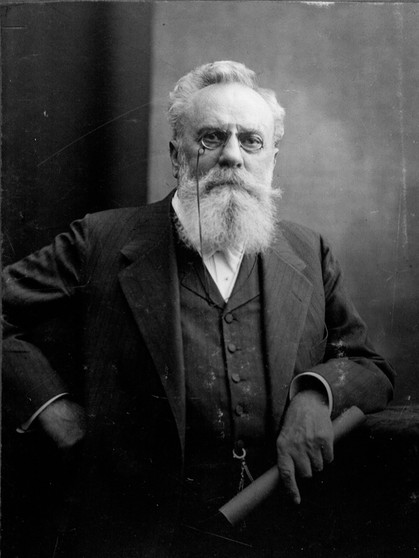
Friedrich Hessing (date unknown)

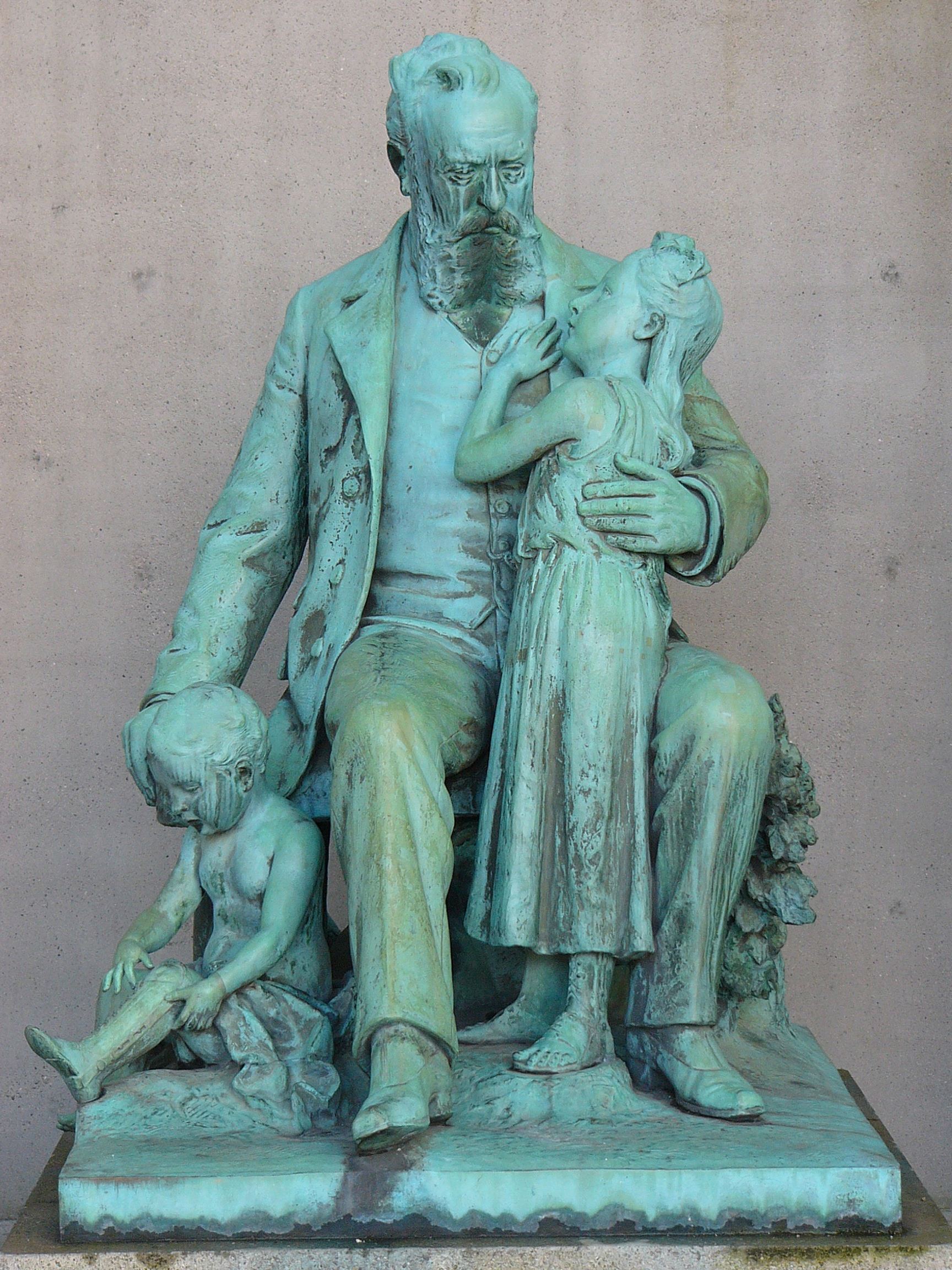
Monument to Hessing; by Eugen Boermel

Friedrich Hessing, after 1913 von Hessing (19 June 1838, Buch am Wald - 16 March 1918, Göggingen) was an organ builder and a pioneer in the field of orthopedic technology.

== Life and work ==
He was the thirteenth and youngest child born to Johann Georg Hessing (1793-1858), a farmer, and his wife Maria Barbara, née Klee (1796-1861), a midwife. An impoverished upbringing may have led to his small stature of only 4' 8".

After completing his primary education in 1852, he began training as a gardener for the Hohenlohe family. After two years, he quit to take an apprenticeship in carpentry; obtaining his journeyman's license in 1857. He then found employment at the organ building firm of G. F. Steinmeyer & Co. in Oettingen, where he learned how to build organs and harmoniums. After some further training in Stuttgart, he moved to Augsburg to work with the piano manufacturer, Max Joseph Schramm (1838-1916).

In 1866, he received a business license to make organs. That same year, he made an artificial foot for an amputee. The following year, he asked the city of Augsburg for financial support, so he could make artificial limbs a regular part of his business. His request was denied. In 1868, his application to open an orthopedic sanatorium was also denied. He was not discouraged and, later that year, received permission from the Regierung von Schwaben. His clinic opened within a few weeks and he took out a newspaper advertisement, assuring everyone that his therapies would not include surgery.

The response was positive and he treated thousands of people there; including the writer Max Brod, who was fitted with what came to be known as a Hessingkorsett, for a spinal curvature. Later, Brod would describe his stay there in his memoirs. In addition to the corset, he was also known for a "schienenhülsenapparat", for treating the effects of polio, the basic design of which is still in use today. Despite this, for many years, the sale of organs and pianos remained his primary source of income and provided most of the funds needed for establishing the sanatorium.

In 1886, he added an entertainment facility, the Kurhaus Göggingen, designed by the architect, Jean Keller. In the 1890s, he opened a spa complex at Rothenburg ob der Tauber. His true breakthrough came in 1899, when he successfully treated Augusta Victoria of Schleswig-Holstein, German Empress and Queen of Prussia, for an ankle fracture. As a result, he became acceptable to the aristocracy and the international public. In 1904, he was appointed a "Royal Bavarian Councilor" and, in 1913, was named a Knight in the Order of Merit of the Bavarian Crown, which gave him the right to use the noble prefix "von".

His legacy was passed to the Hessing Foundation which still exists today and operates, among things, the Hessing-Klinik, a geriatric rehabilitation center. The private Hessingpark Clinic operates a rheumatism center as well as an orthopedic shoe company. A street in Bad Reichenhall is named after him.
