= Rothenburg ob der Tauber =

- Town
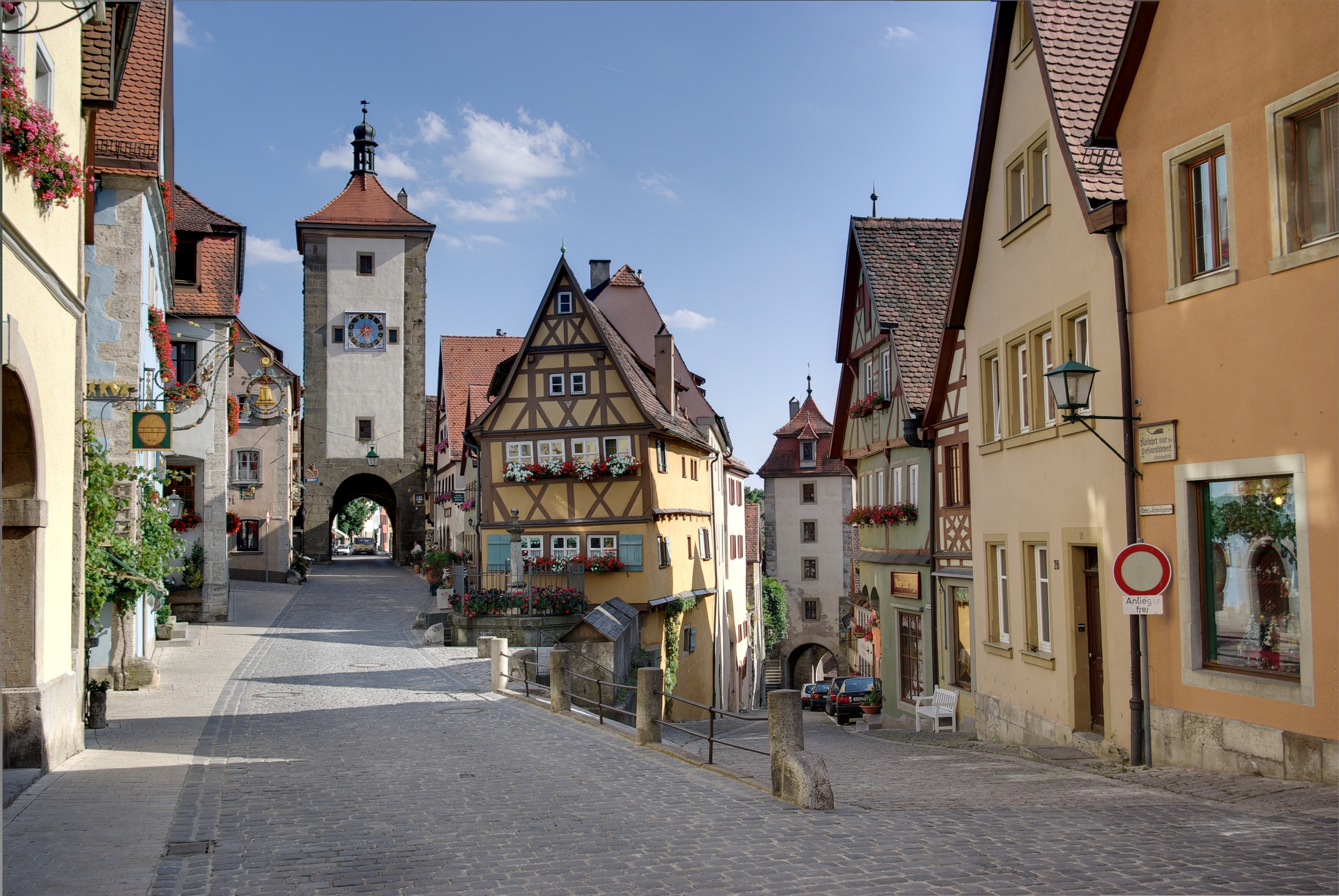
- Plönlein with Kobolzeller Steige and Spitalgasse

- Coat of arms

- Location of Rothenburg ob der Tauber within Ansbach district
- Interactive map of Rothenburg ob der Tauber
- Location within Germany Location within Bavaria
- Coordinates: 49°23′N 10°11′E
- Country: Germany
- State: Bavaria
- Admin. region: Middle Franconia
- District: Ansbach

Government
  - Mayor (2020–26): Markus Naser (Ind.)

Area
  - Total: 41.67 km^{2} (16.09 sq mi)
- Elevation: 430 m (1,410 ft)

Population (2025-12-31)
  - Total: 11,331
  - Density: 271.9/km^{2} (704.3/sq mi)
- Time zone: UTC+01:00 (CET)
  - Summer (DST): UTC+02:00 (CEST)
- Postal codes: 91541
- Dialling codes: 09861
- Vehicle registration: AN, DKB, FEU, ROT
- Website: www.rothenburg.de

Rothenburg ob der Tauber (German pronunciation: [ˈʁoːtn̩bʊʁk ʔɔp deːɐ̯ ˈtaʊbɐ], lit. 'Rothenburg above the Tauber') is a town in the district of Ansbach of Mittelfranken (Middle Franconia), in the Franconia region of Bavaria, Germany. It is best known for its well-preserved medieval old town, a destination for tourists from around the world. It is part of the popular Romantic Road through southern Germany. Today it is one of only four towns in Germany that still have completely intact city walls, the other three being Nördlingen, Dinkelsbühl and Berching, all in Bavaria.

Rothenburg was a free imperial city (German: Freie Reichsstadt) from the late Middle Ages to 1803. Between 1884 and 1903, Johann Friedrich von Hessing built the Wildbad spa in Rothenburg ob der Tauber.

== Name ==
The name "Rothenburg ob der Tauber" is German for "Red castle above the Tauber", describing the town's location on a plateau overlooking the Tauber River. Rothenburg Castle, in close vicinity to the village and also called Alte Burg (old castle), gave the city its name.

== History ==
=== Middle Ages ===
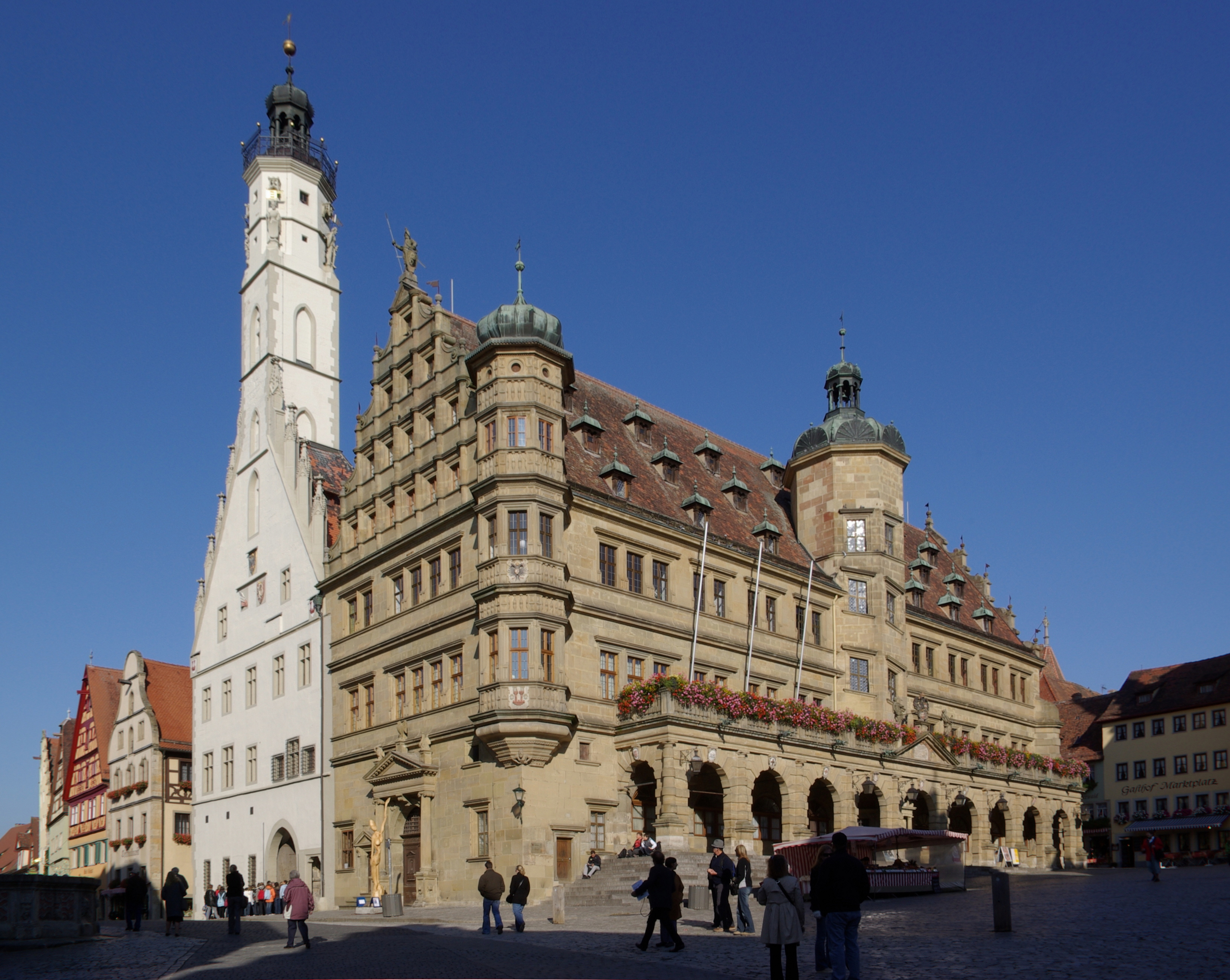
Town Hall of Rothenburg

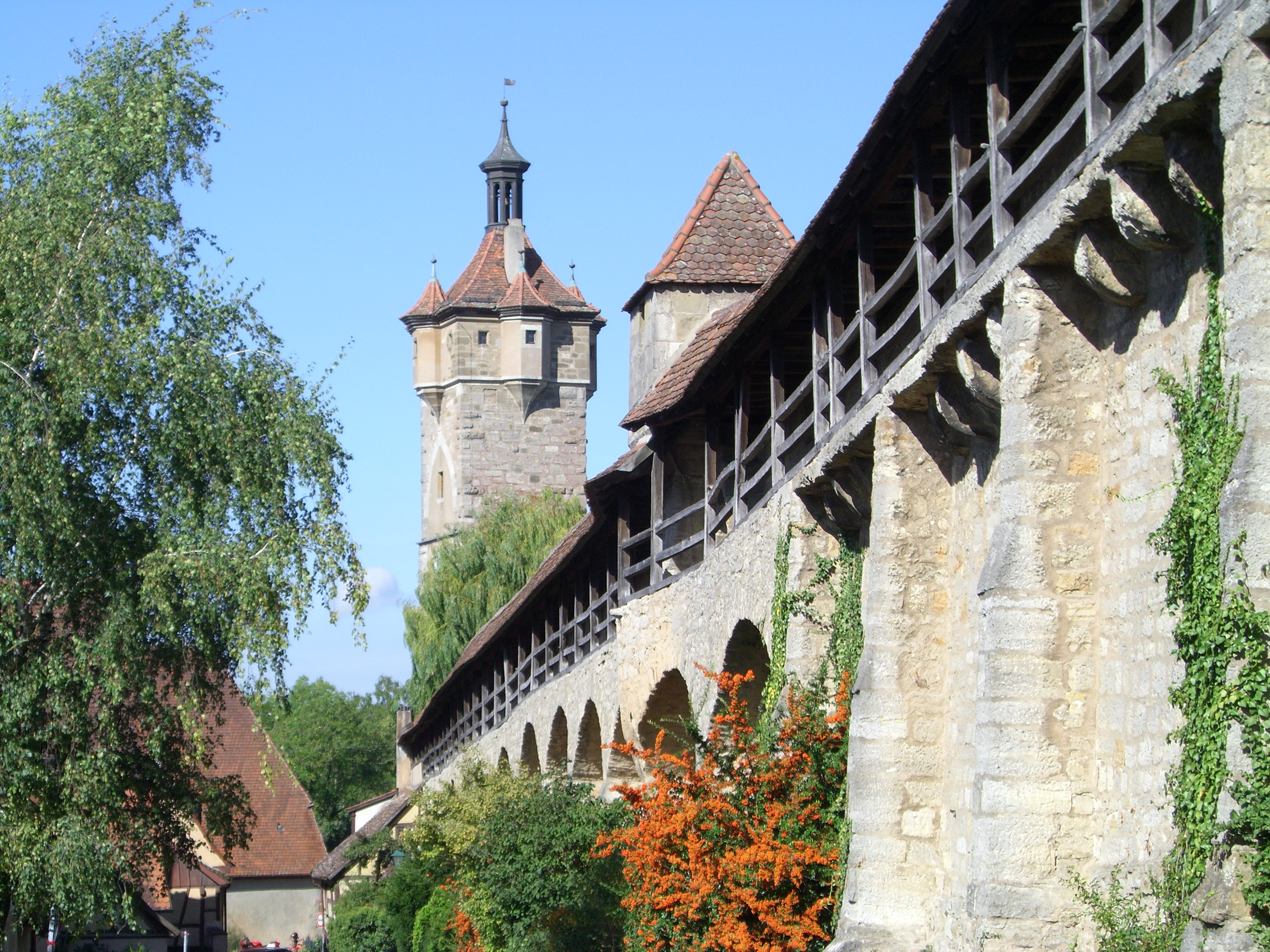
Medieval town wall and Klingentorturm, a defensive tower

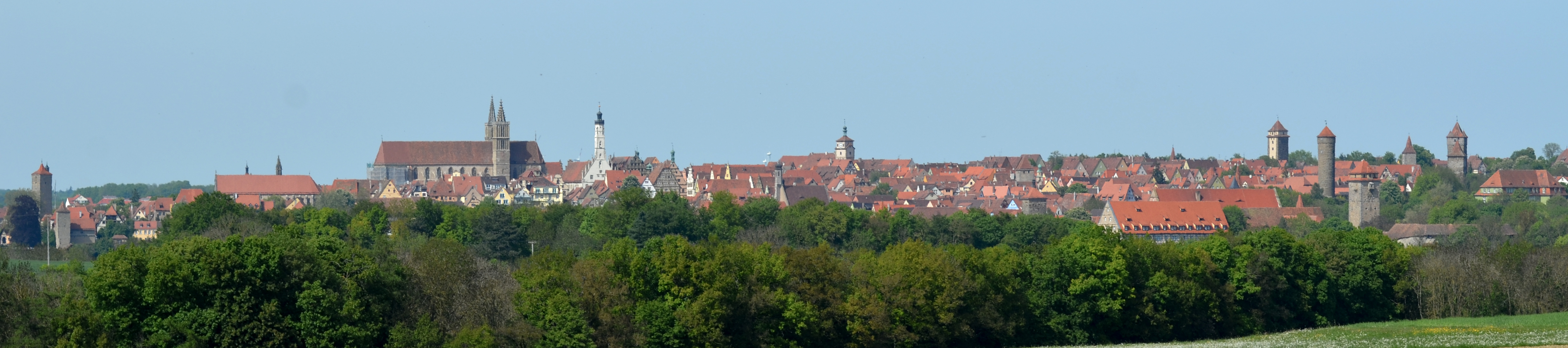
View of Rothenburg south of the Tauber

The location was most likely inhabited by Celts before the first century CE.

In 950, the weir system in today's castle garden was constructed by the Count of Comburg-Rothenburg.

In 1070, the counts of Comburg-Rothenburg, who also owned the village of Gebsattel, built Rothenburg Castle on the mountain top high above the River Tauber. The counts of the Comburg-Rothenburg dynasty died out in 1116 with the death of the last count, Count Heinrich. Emperor Heinrich V instead appointed his nephew Konrad von Hohenstaufen as the successor to the Comburg-Rothenburg properties.

In 1142, Konrad von Hohenstaufen, who became King Konrad III (1138–52), traded part of the monastery of Neumünster in Würzburg above the village of Detwang and built the Stauffer-Castle Rothenburg on this cheaper land. He held court there and appointed officials to act as caretakers.

In 1170, the city of Rothenburg was founded at the time of the building of Staufer Castle. The center was the marketplace and St. James' Church (in German: the St. Jakob). The development of the oldest fortification can be seen, the old cellar/old moat and the milk market. Walls and towers were built in the 13th century. Preserved are the “White Tower” and the Markus Tower with the Röder Arch.

From 1194 to 1254, the representatives of the Staufer dynasty governed the area around Rothenburg. Around this time, the Order of St. John and other orders were founded near St. James' Church and a Dominican nunnery (1258).

From 1241 to 1242, the Staufer Imperial tax statistics recorded the names of the Jews in Rothenburg. Rabbi Meir Ben Baruch of Rothenburg (died 1293, buried 1307 in Worms) had a great reputation as a jurist in Europe.

In 1274, Rothenburg was accorded privileges by King Rudolf of Habsburg as a free imperial city. Three famous fairs were established in the city and in the following centuries, the city expanded. The citizens of the city and the Knights of the Hinterland build the Franziskaner (Franciscan) Monastery and the Holy Ghost Hospital (1376/78 incorporated into the city walls). The German Order began the building of St. James' Church, which the citizens have used since 1336. The Heilig Blut (Holy Blood) pilgrimage attracted many pilgrims to Rothenburg, at the time one of the 20 largest cities of the Holy Roman Empire. The population was around 5,500 people within the city walls and another 14,000 in the 150 square miles (390 km^{2}) of the surrounding territory.

The Staufer Castle was destroyed by an earthquake in 1356; the St. Blaise chapel is the last remnant today.

=== The Thirty Years' War ===
The Meistertrunk scene in the astronomical clock of the Ratstrinkstube

In October 1631, during the Thirty Years' War, the Catholic Johann Tserclaes, Count of Tilly, wanted to quarter his 40,000 troops in Protestant Lutheran Rothenburg. Rather than allow entrance, the town defended itself and intended to withstand a siege. However, Tilly's troops quickly defeated Rothenburg, losing only 300 soldiers. A popular legend called the Meistertrunk states that when General Tilly condemned the councilmen to death and was set to burn the city down, the councilmen tried to sway him with a large drink of 3 1/4 liters wine. Tilly proclaimed that if anyone could drink it all in one drink, he would spare the city. The mayor at the time, Georg Nusch, succeeded, and General Tilly kept his word. However, the story is almost certainly apocryphal. It does not appear in the chronicle of Sebastian Dehner, written about fifteen years after the facts, the earliest account. The Meistertrunk appears for the first time in the chronicle of Georg Heinrich Schaffert, more than a century later.

After the winter, they left the town poor and nearly empty, and in 1634 a bubonic plague outbreak killed many more townsfolk. Without any money or power, Rothenburg stopped growing, thus preserving its 17th-century state.

=== 19th century ===
Since 1803, the town has been a part of Bavaria. The famous German landscape painter Eugen Bracht visited Rothenburg in 1877; although he stayed only two days, he was clearly impressed. Some years later, especially artists of Romanticism, such as Hans Thoma and Carl Spitzweg, visited Rothenburg, too, followed by the first tourists. Laws were created to prevent major changes to the town. In 1884 Friedrich Hessing built up till 1903 the "Hessingsche Wildbad" spa hotel.

=== Nazi Germany and World War II ===
Rothenburg held a special significance for Nazi ideologists. For them, it was the epitome of the German 'Home Town', representing all that was quintessentially German. Throughout the 1930s, the Nazi organization KDF (Kraft durch Freude) "Strength through Joy" organized regular day trips to Rothenburg from all across the Reich. This initiative was staunchly supported by Rothenburg's citizenry – many of whom were sympathetic to National Socialism – both for its perceived economic benefits and because Rothenburg was hailed as "the most German of German towns". In October 1938, Rothenburg expelled its Jewish citizens, much to the approval of Nazis and their supporters across Germany.

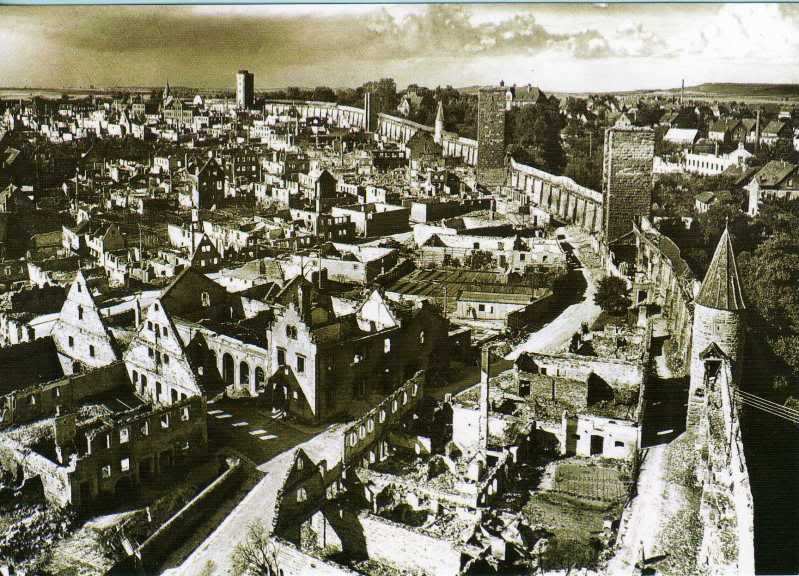
Newer eastern part of Rothenburg following Allied bombing raid with the still standing outer walls of the buildings which were used in the rebuild, 1945

In March 1945, during World War II, German soldiers were stationed in Rothenburg to defend it. On 31 March bombs were dropped over Rothenburg by 16 planes, killing 37 people and destroying around 275 houses (around 32% of all houses), six public buildings and damaging nine watchtowers and over 2,000 feet (610 m) of the wall. Because incendiary bombs were used most outer walls still stood after the attack and were used to rebuild the newer eastern part of the old town. Around 265 houses were rebuilt. The U.S. Assistant Secretary of War, John J. McCloy, knew about the historic importance and beauty of Rothenburg, so he ordered U.S. Army General Jacob L. Devers not to use artillery in taking Rothenburg. Battalion commander Major Frank Burk ordered six soldiers of the 12th Infantry Regiment (United States), 4th Division to march into Rothenburg on a three-hour mission and negotiate the surrender of the town. First Lieutenant Noble V. Borders of Louisville, Kentucky, First Lieutenant Edmund H. Austgen of Hammond, Indiana, Private William M. Dwyer of Trenton, New Jersey, Private Herman Lichey of Glendale, California, Private Robert S. Grimm of Tower City, Pennsylvania, and Private Peter Kick of Lansing, Illinois were sent on the mission. When stopped by a German soldier, Private Lichey, who spoke fluent German and served as the group's translator, held up a white flag and explained, “We are representatives of our division commander. We bring you his offer to spare the city of Rothenburg from shelling and bombing if you agree not to defend it. We have been given three hours to get this message to you. If we haven’t returned to our lines by 1800 hours, the town will be bombed and shelled to the ground.” The local military commander Major Thömmes gave up the town, ignoring the order of Hitler for all towns to fight to the end and thereby saving it from total destruction by artillery. American troops of the 12th Infantry Regiment, 4th Division occupied the town on 17 April 1945, and in November 1948 McCloy was named an honorary citizen (German: Ehrenbürger) of Rothenburg.

=== Post-war reconstruction ===
Around 32% of Rothenburg ob der Tauber, mainly in the eastern half of the town, had to be repaired or rebuilt after being bombed in World War II (with most outer walls still standing and used for the rebuild houses). Many of the rebuilt facades can now be distinguished from the surviving medieval structures as being plainer, reconstruction aiming not to replicate exactly what stood before, only to rebuild in the same style as the surviving buildings so that the new buildings would still fit into the overall aesthetic of the town. Any surviving walls of bombed-out buildings were kept in their reconstructed facades as much as possible. In the case of more significant or iconic structures, such as the town hall, whose roof was destroyed, and parts of the town wall, restoration to their original state was done as accurately as possible, and they now appear exactly as they did before the war. Donations for the rebuilding works in Rothenburg were received from all over the world, and rebuilt parts of the walls feature commemorative bricks with donor names.

The older western section from which the medieval town originated and contains most of the town's historic monuments, did not suffer from the bombing. Thus, most of the buildings in the west and the south of Rothenburg still exist today in their original medieval or prewar state. It is also noteworthy that while the eastern walls and towers received bomb damage, they, unlike the houses in that part of town, remained relatively intact; many parts even survived completely because of their sturdy stone construction. In most cases, only the wooden upper portions or roofs of the eastern towers and walls needed to be rebuilt, and most of their stone structure had been preserved.

== Lord Mayors ==
- 1945–1952: Friedrich Hörner, SPD
- 1952–1964: Dr. Erich Lauterbach (1879–1966), independent
- 1964–1976: Alfred Ledertheil, SPD
- 1976–1988: Oskar Schubert
- 1988–2006: Herbert Hachtel (born 1941), SPD
- 2006–2020: Walter Hartl (born 1956), independent
- since 2020: Markus Naser (born 1981), independent

== Town ==
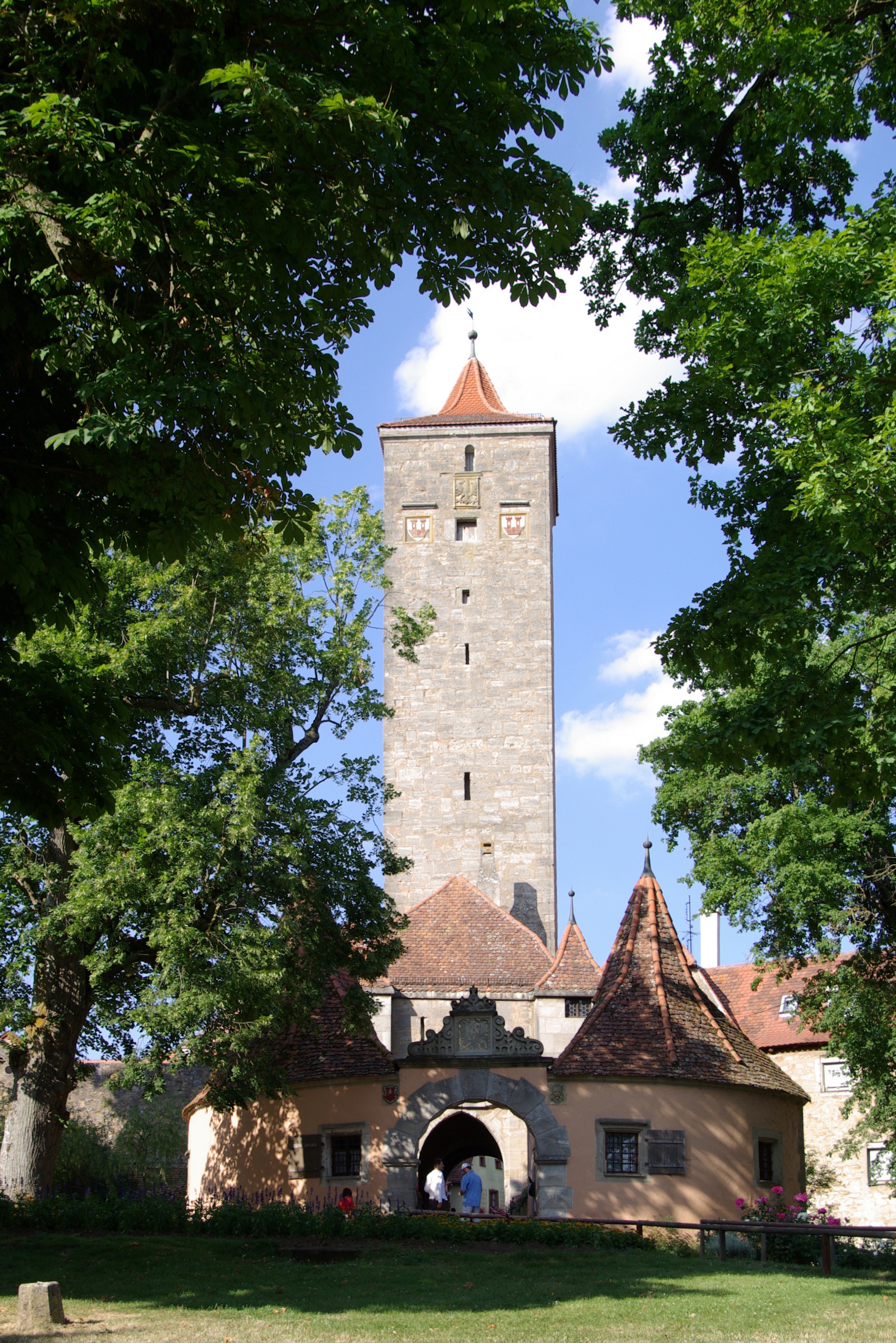
The Burgtor (castle gate) on the western side of Rothenburg

The Rathaus (town hall) is a notable renaissance building. The rear Gothic part of the building dates from 1250, and the attached front Renaissance building was started in 1572. This building served as the seat of government for the city-state during the medieval ages and for the city of Rothenburg since the formation of the federalist government. The town hall tower of Rothenburg ob der Tauber is one of the only accessible towers in the town of Rothenburg. The other is the Roedertor tower at the east end of the city and is open daily for visitors to climb. It is almost 61 meters (200 feet) tall. At the top of the tower, an admission fee of 2 euros is charged to enter the room with a scenic view of almost the entire town. The room also contains manuscripts providing the visitor with historical information about the construction and relevant history of the city wall.

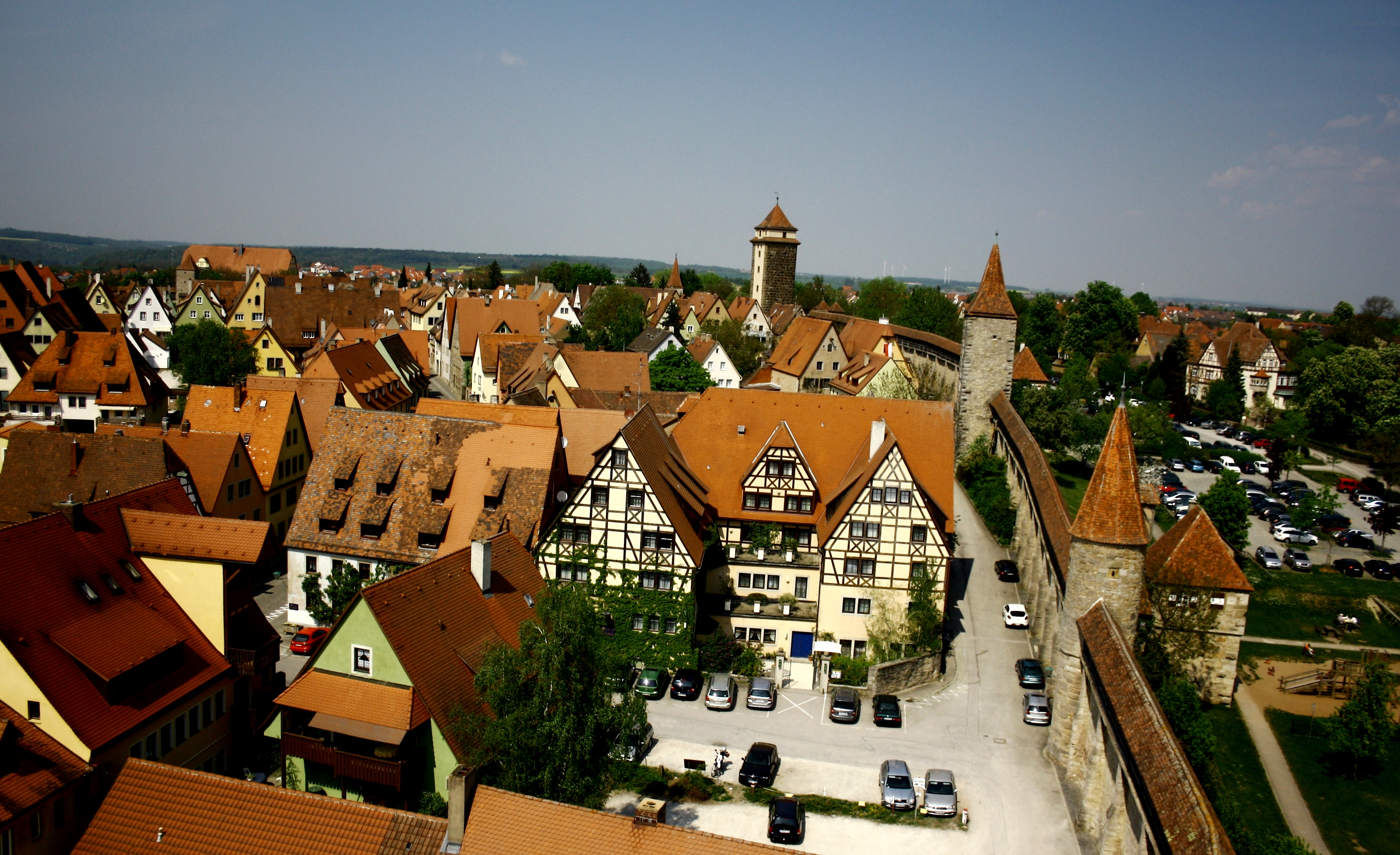
The eastern side of Rothenburg. Houses here were rebuilt after 1945.

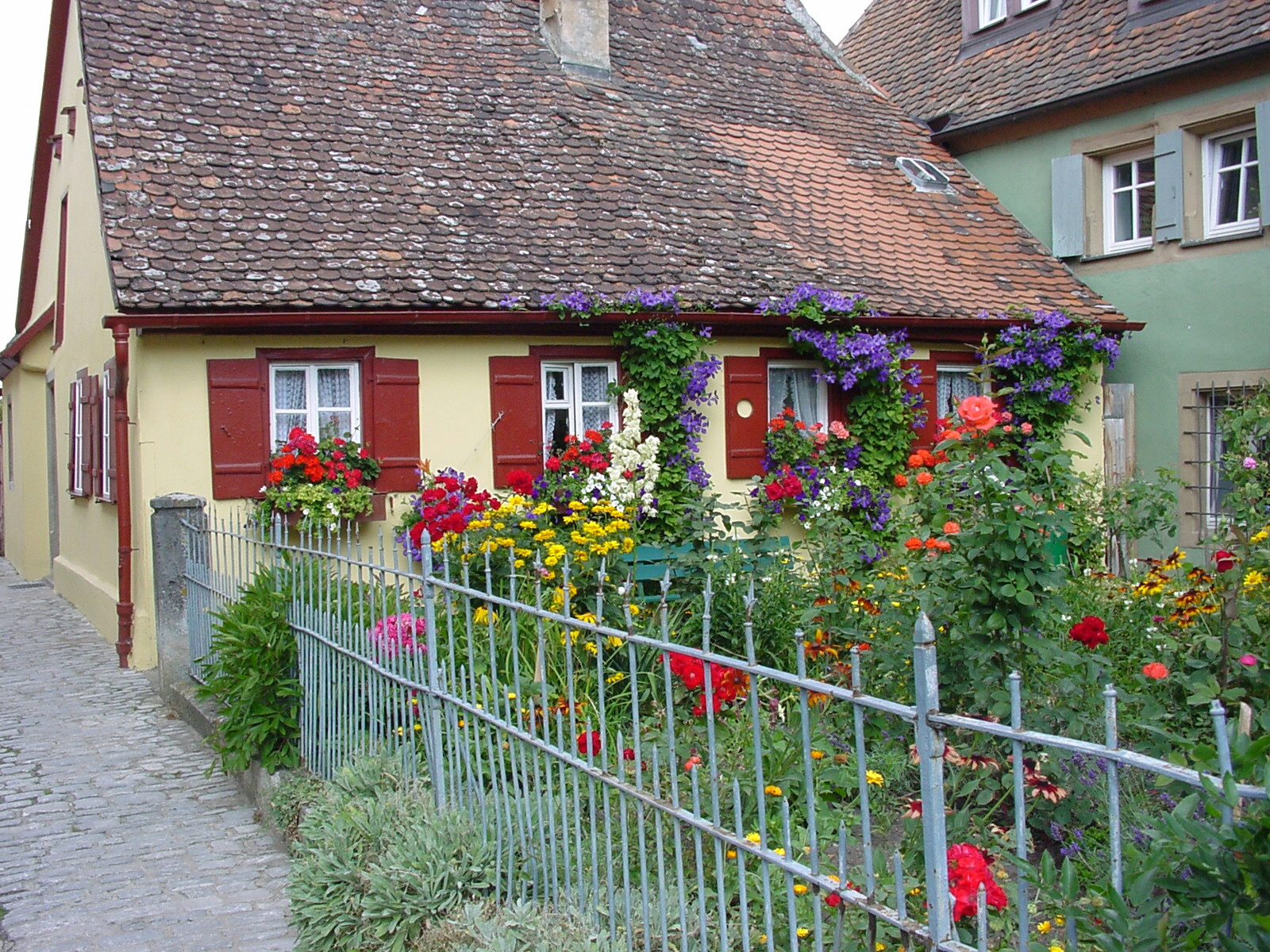
Garden in Rothenburg (2005)

While buildings within the walled city reflect the city's medieval history, this part of the city is in many ways a normal, modern German town with some concession to the tourist trade. Many stores and hotels catering to tourists are clustered around the Town Hall Square and along several major streets (such as Herrngasse, Schmiedgasse). Also in the town is a Criminal Museum, containing various punishment and torture devices used during the Middle Ages. A staple pastry of Rothenburg ob der Tauber is the Schneeball, deep-fried dough shaped like a snowball and covered in either confectioner's sugar or chocolate.

== Main sights ==
=== Museums ===
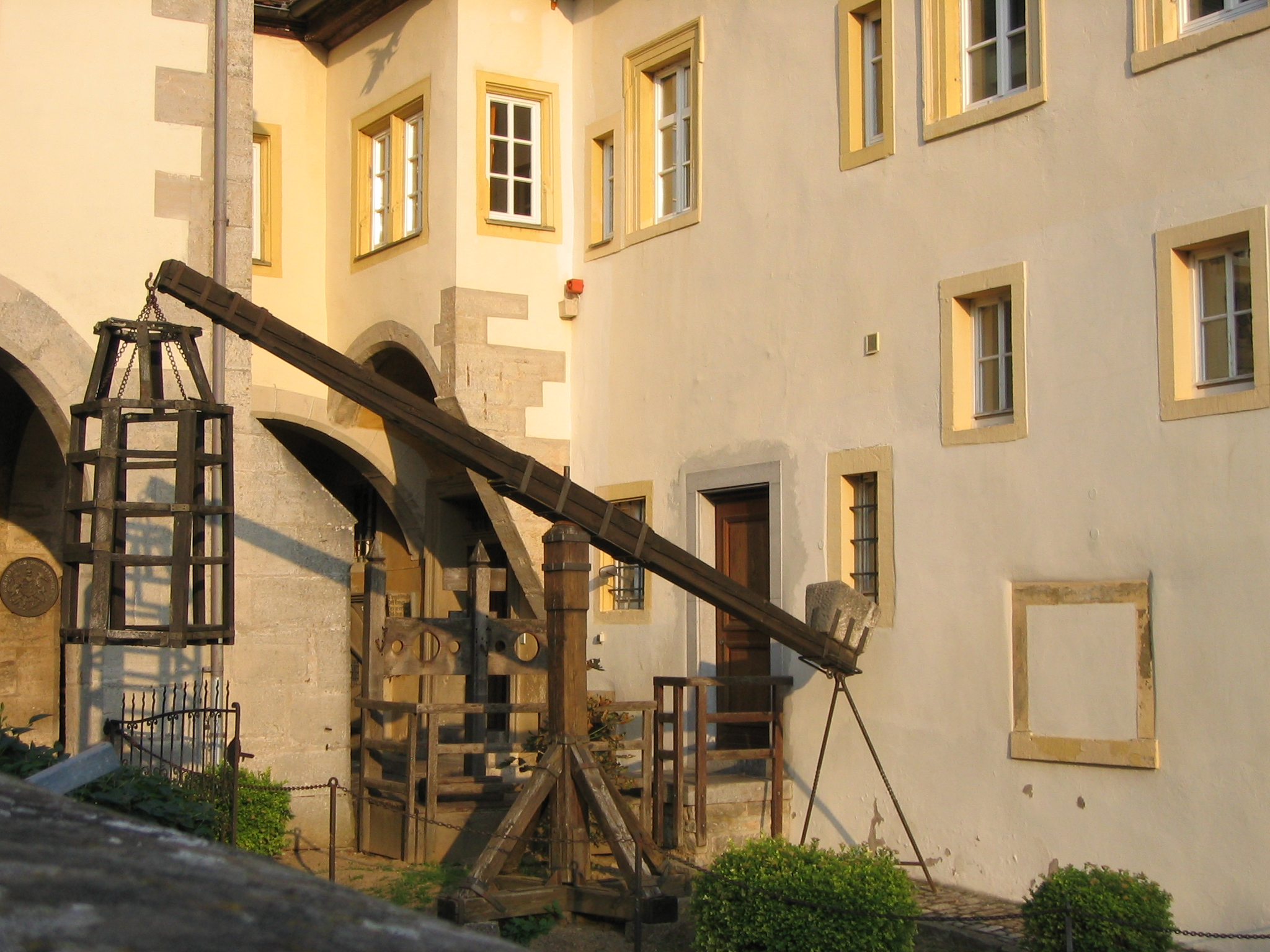
Ducking stool at the medieval Criminal Museum

- The Criminal Museum (Kriminalmuseum) gives an insight into judicial punishment over the last 1,000 years. Exhibits include instruments of torture, shrew's fiddles, scold's bridles, medieval legal texts, and guidance on witch trials.
- Imperial City Museum (Reichsstadtmuseum) with the municipal collections and a weapon collection
- Doll and Toy Museum (Puppen- und Spielzeugmuseum)
- Shepherds' Dance Museum (Schäfertanz Museum)
- Christmas Museum (Weihnachtsmuseum "Käthe Wohlfahrt")
- Craft House (Handwerkerhaus): a listed building dating back to 1270, with 11 rooms showing the everyday life of craftsmen's families in Rothenburg
- Historical vaulting and state dungeon

=== Places of worship ===
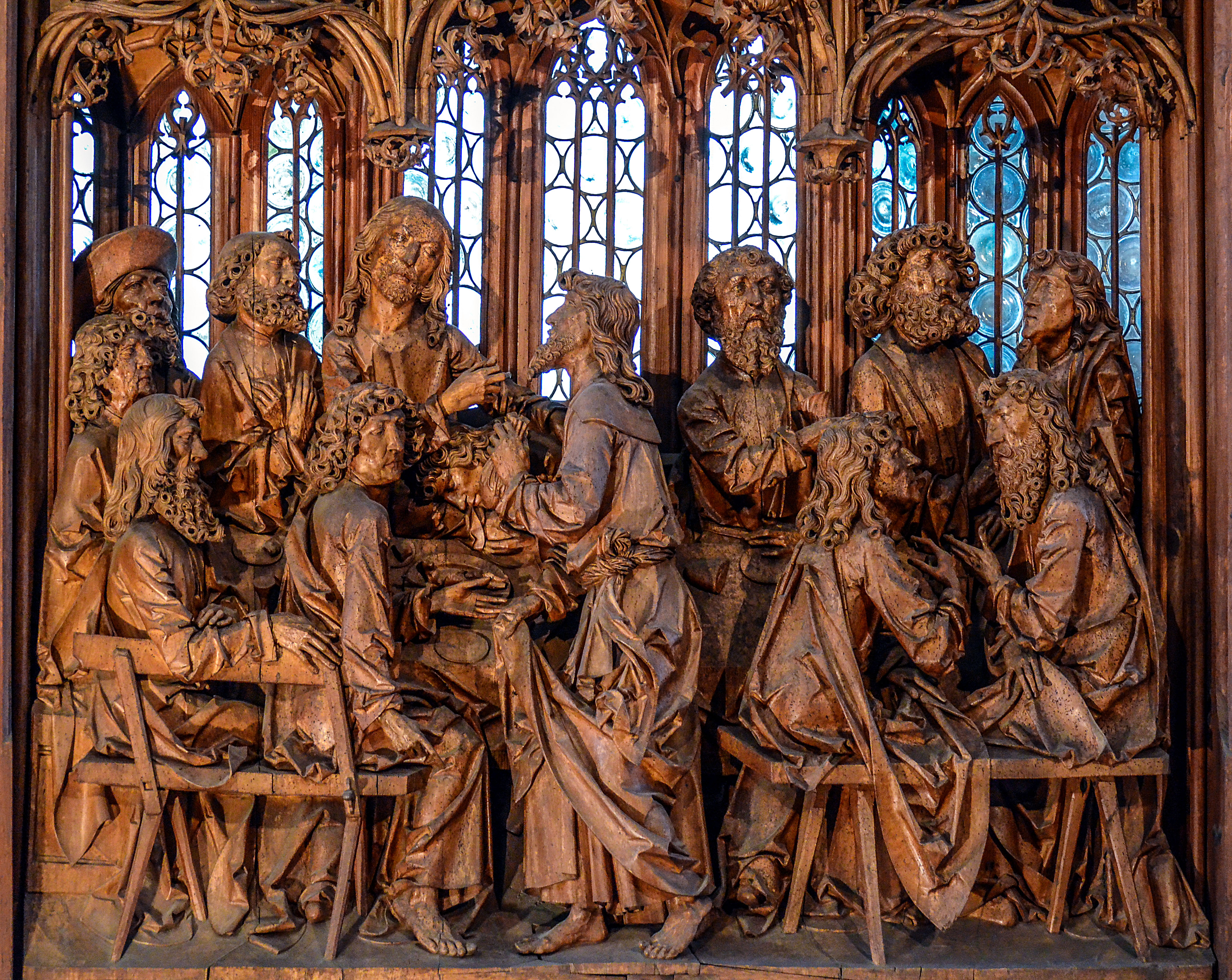
The Holy Blood reredos in the town church of St. James, made from 1500 to 1505

- St. James' Church with its Holy Blood reredos by Tilman Riemenschneider, another Riemenschneider altar (Altar of the Holy Cross) is in the Detwang church.
- Great hall of the castle (St. Blasius' Chapel)
- St. Peter and St. Paul's Church, Detwang
- St. Wolfgang's Church by the Klingentor gate (fortified church)
- Monastery
- Franciscan church

=== Other buildings ===
- Town walls
- Plönlein
- Spital bastion (Spitalbastei), a barbican with an abwurfdach built by Rothenburg architect and stonemason, Leonhard Weidmann
- Toppler Castle in the Tauber valley
- Double bridge over the Tauber
- The Wildbad Rothenburg was built between 1898 and 1903 by Friedrich Hessing as a spa hotel. Since 1982 it has been used as an Evangelical conference centre.
- Historic town hall with clock tower and Meistertrunk clock
- Altes Brauhaus
- Rödertor

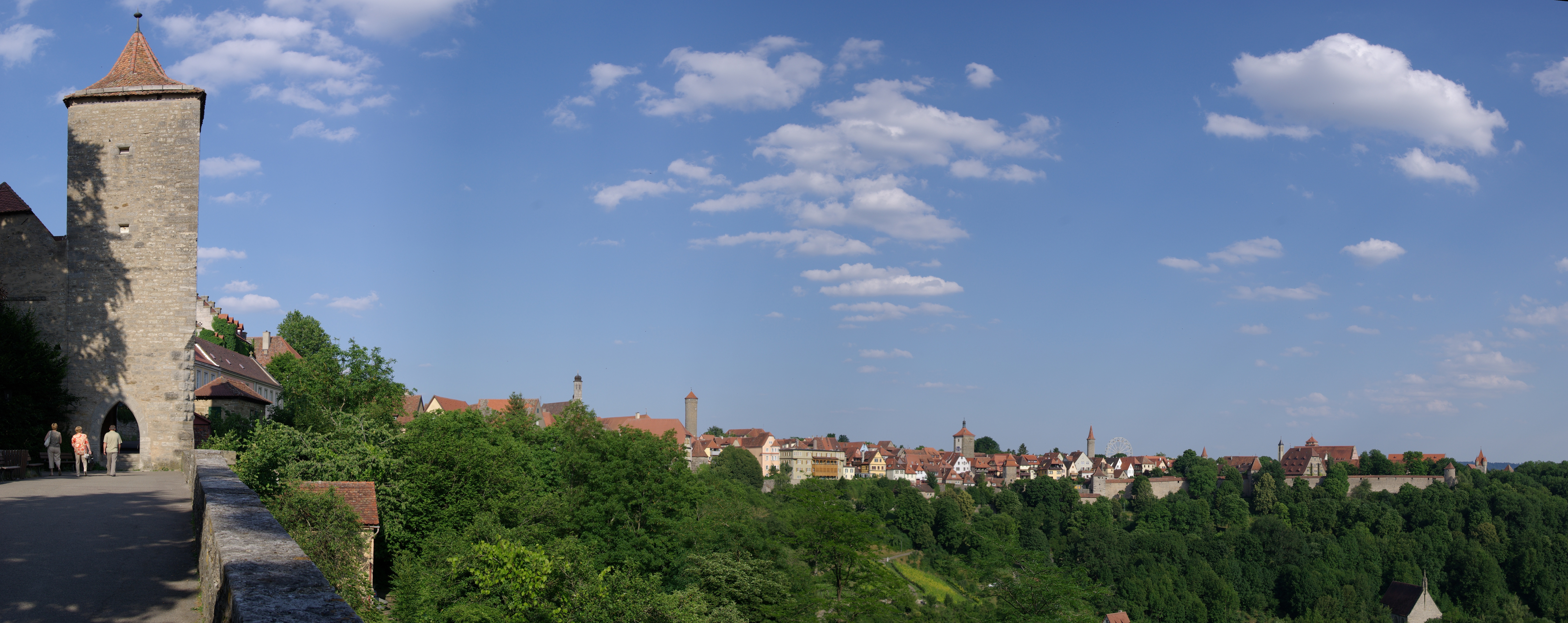
View from the Castle Gate (Burgtor)

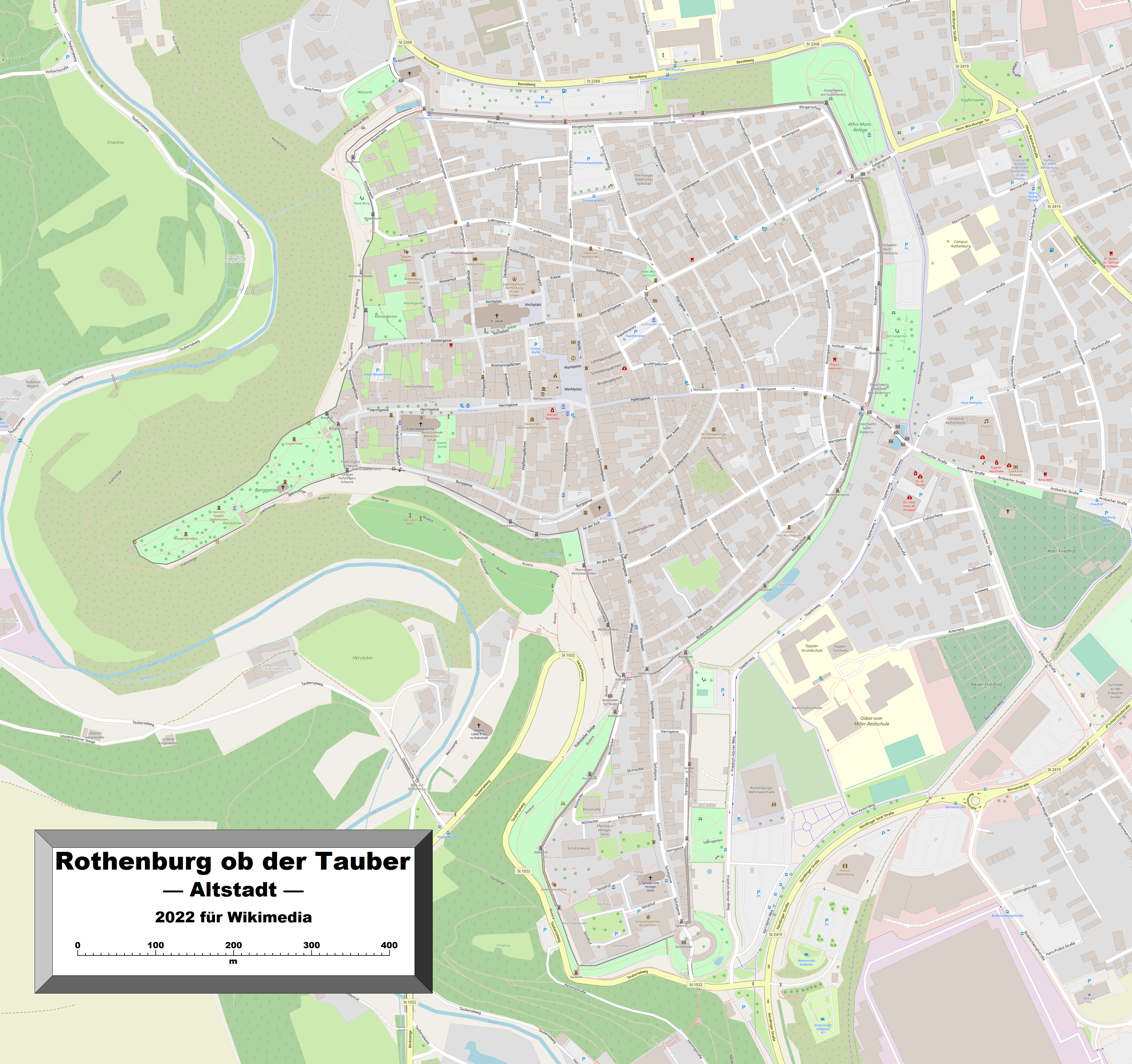
Map of Rothenburg ob der Tauber's old town

- Old Smithy
- Old Town Hall
- Zur Höll, a tavern dating from around 900 AD, whose name literally means "to Hell".

== Cultural references ==
Rothenburg has appeared in several films, notably fantasies. It was the location for the Vulgarian village scenes in the 1968 family movie, Chitty Chitty Bang Bang. It is sometimes mistaken as the town at the end of Willy Wonka & the Chocolate Factory (1971); that town was Nördlingen. The town served as a loose basis for the fictional town of Lebensbaum ("life tree") in the video game Shadow of Memories (Shadow of Destiny in the American market). Shots of the town are shown in some parts of The Wonderful World of the Brothers Grimm and the trailer for the film. The camera flies over the town from the direction of the valley towards the Town Hall. A plaque exists on the rebuilt town wall to commemorate this. Filming was done in Rothenburg for Harry Potter and the Deathly Hallows – Part 1 (2010) and Part 2 (2011), but didn't make it into the final version of the movies.

Robert Shackleton's Unvisited Places of Old Europe contains a chapter, "The Old Red City of Rothenburg", about the city and its history. Rothenburg is the primary location for Elizabeth Peters's mystery novel, Borrower of the Night (1973) about the search for a missing Tilman Riemenschneider sculpture.

The town featured as the location in the Belgian comic book, The Adventures of Yoko Tsuno in the episode of La Frontière de la vie (On the Edge of Life, 1977) and it inspired the look of the town in the Japanese manga and anime series A Little Snow Fairy Sugar (2001) (the main character Saga Bergmann's house was the notable house in the crossroads).

Illustrator and concept artist Gustaf Tenggren based the village in Disney's Pinocchio on photographs and images of the town.

Rothenburg's famous street Kobolzeller Steige and Spitalgasse is depicted on the cover of two Blackmore's Night albums, 1999's Under a Violet Moon and their 2006 album Winter Carols.

It is often thought to have inspired the town center of Mêlée Island in the 1990 point-and-click graphic adventure game The Secret of Monkey Island, but creator Ron Gilbert has claimed the resemblance is a coincidence.

The video game Team Fortress 2 features a map titled "Rottenburg", a play on the original's namesake along with visually similar architecture.

The southern part of the marketplace is prominently featured in the video game Gabriel Knight 2 depicting the fictional town of Rittersberg.

The WWII-era first-person shooter Medal of Honor: Allied Assault, from the Medal of Honor video game series, features a level in which the player must fight their way through a snowy town near the Siegfried Line in Germany that is strikingly similar to Rothenburg, buildings with similar architecture can be seen throughout the town, as well as similar-looking streets, as the player makes their way through.

In September 2004, in the virtual world of Second Life, a group of volunteers (not related to the city of Rothenburg in any way) built a city strongly inspired by Rothenburg and its main landmarks. Called Neufreistadt, it's not only still around and visitable (as of 2026), but it also hosts what is one of the oldest long-running communities in Second Life. The building maintenance and overall hosting fees are supported by 'citizens' who hire parcels (often a single residential building) for a small fee. In return, they are allowed to vote and get democratically elected for the community's government.

== Twin towns ==
- Athis-Mons, France
- Suzdal, Russia
- Telč, Czech Republic
- Montagnana, Italy
- Uchiko, Japan

== Notable people ==
- Meir of Rothenburg (c. 1215–1293), rabbi and poet
- Meir HaKohen (c. 1260–1298), rabbi and author of Hagahot Maimuniot.
- Franz Leydig (1821–1908), German zoologist and comparative anatomist

== See also ==
- Romantic Road
