= Schneeball (pastry) =

Deep-fried German pastry

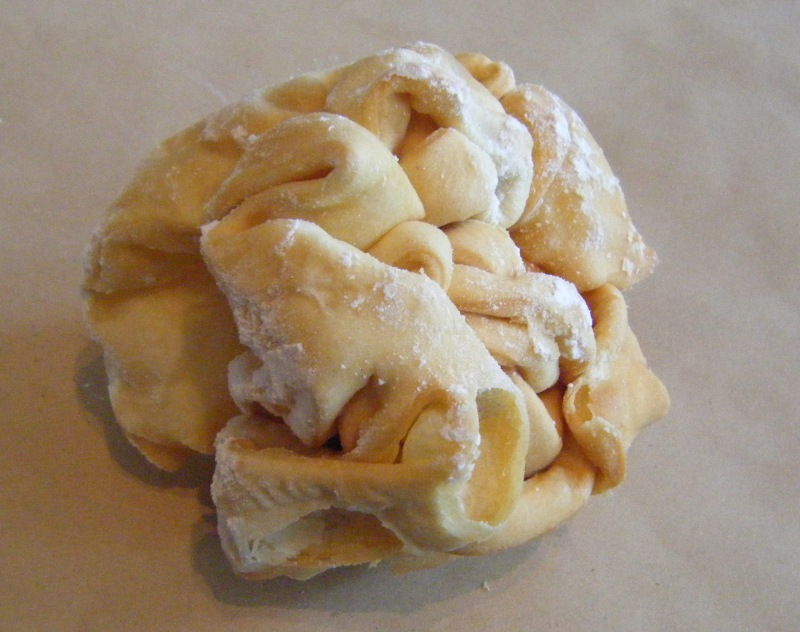
- Alternative names: Schneeballen
- Type: Pastry
- Place of origin: Germany
- Main ingredients: flour, eggs, sugar, butter, cream, plum schnaps

A Schneeball (German: [ˈʃneːˌbal]) or Schneeballen (plural: Schneebälle (German: [ˈʃneːˌbɛlə]) and Schneeballen respectively), snowball in English, is a deep-fried pastry made from shortcrust pastry especially popular in the area of Rothenburg ob der Tauber. Its name derives from its round, ball-like shape, its diameter of about eight to ten centimeters, and its traditional decoration with white confectioner's sugar. It is also known as a Storchennest (pronounced [ˈʃtɔʁçn̩ˌnɛst] stork's nest).

== History ==
This kind of pastry has been known for at least 400 years in the regions of Franconia and Hohenlohe (northeast of Baden-Württemberg) where it is very popular. Served only on special occasions such as weddings in the past; they are nowadays available throughout the year and can be found around Rothenburg ob der Tauber in bakeries, pastry shops, and cafes. In the town itself there are even companies that specialize in the pastry, constantly coming out with new variations. Beside the classical ones dusted with confectioner's sugar, there are recipes glazed with chocolate and nuts or filled with marzipan. As the pastry is considered the signature dish of the town, it is a very common souvenir.

== Preparation ==
The main ingredients are flour, eggs, sugar, butter, cream, and plum schnaps.

To give it the characteristic shape, the dough is rolled out and cut into even strips with a dough cutter. The strips are then arranged alternately over and under a stick, or the handle of a wooden spoon. Eventually the stick is lifted and slowly removed while the dough strips are formed into a loose ball. Using a special round holder called a Schneeballeneisen in order to retain the shape, the ball is deep-fried in boiling fat until golden brown, and finally dusted with confectioner's sugar while warm.

The schneeball is a dry, cookie-like pastry, so it has a long shelf life - about eight weeks without refrigeration.

== Gallery ==
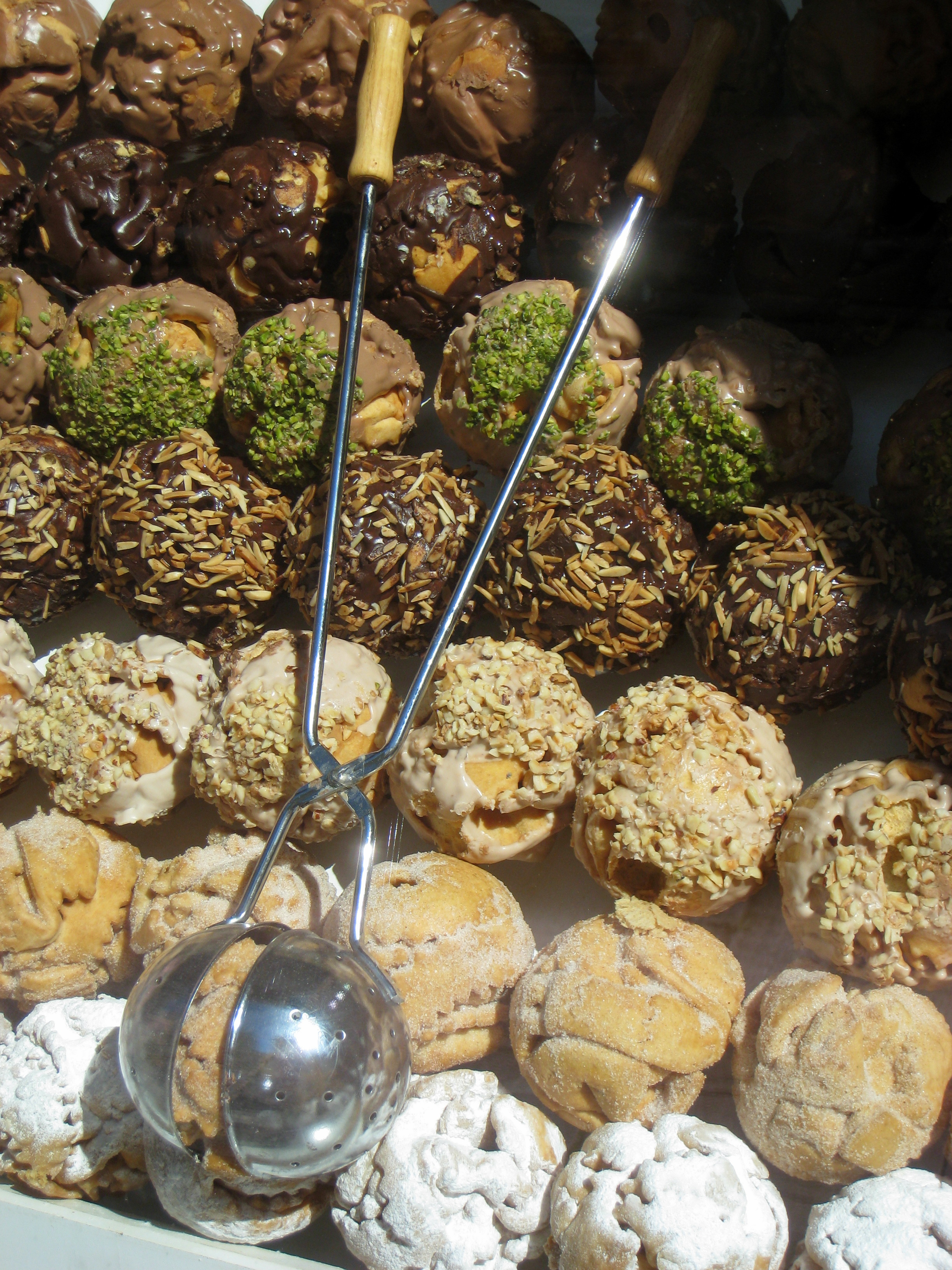
Schneeballen display, with the specialized holder for deep frying

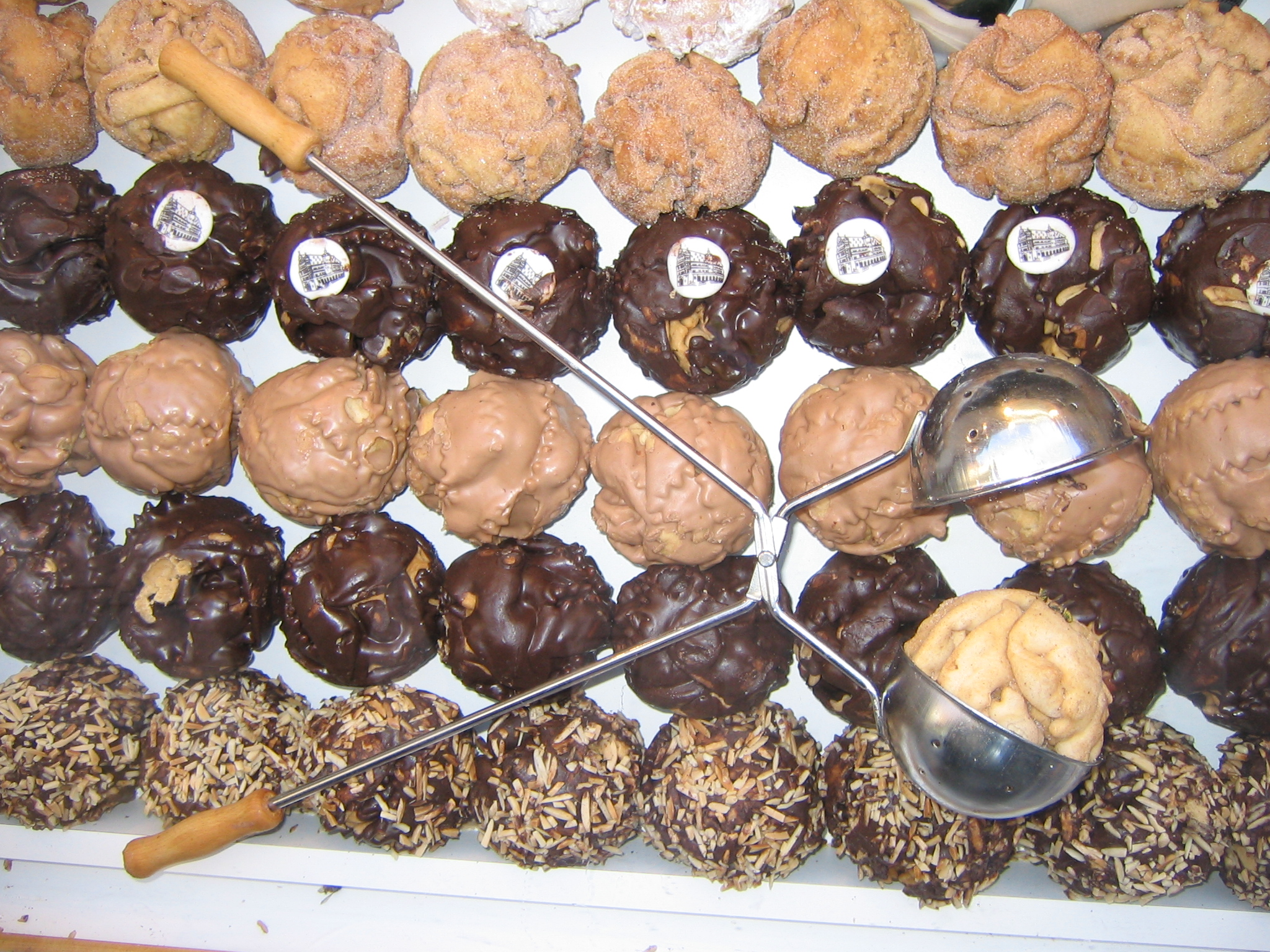
Schneebälle in Rothenburg ob der Tauber

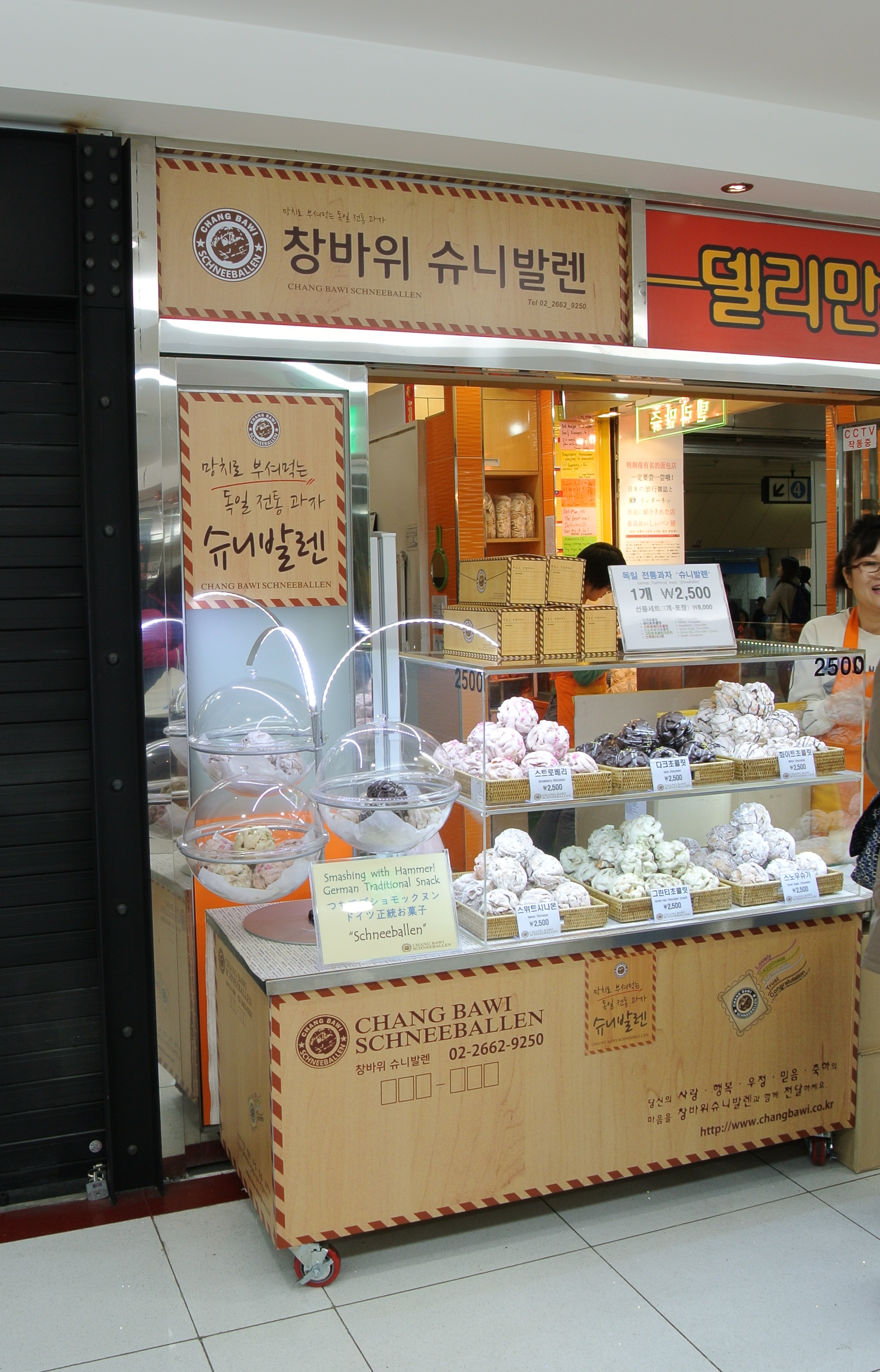
Schneebälle shop in an underground shopping center in Seoul, South Korea

== See also ==
- List of fried dough foods
