= Augsburg-Göggingen =

Coordinates: 48.339°N 10.872°E

Göggingen (German pronunciation: [ˈɡœɡɪŋən]) is one of the 17 Planungsräume (English: Planning district, singular Planungsraum) of Augsburg, Bavaria, Germany. The Planungsraum is made up of three Stadtbezirke (English: wards, singular Stadtbezirk), the 37th, 38th and 40th Stadtbezirke, which are named Göggingen-Nordwest (Northwest), Göggingen-Nordost (Northeast) and Göggingen-Süd (South), respectively. Located in the western part of Augsburg, Göggingen is numbered as the 14th Planungsraum and has an area of 10.79 km^{2} (4.17 mi^{2}). As of January 1, 2006, the population is estimated to be 17,722.

== Location ==
Göggingen is located between the Singold and Wertach rivers, and is bordered to the north by the Planungsräume of Pfersee and Antonsviertel. This area was already growing along with the city center of Augsburg as early as the 19th century. Göggingen is bordered on the east by the Universitätsviertel, where the University of Augsburg is located, and the Hochfeld Planungsraum. It is bordered to the south by Inningen, and to the southwest by Bergheim. The northwestern border is also the city limit of Augsburg, and the district shares a border with the city of Stadtbergen. The geographical center of Augsburg is located in Göggingen at the intersection of Memminger and Eichleitner streets in the north of the district. The outlying areas of the district are considered some of the choicest and most prestigious areas of Augsburg.

== History ==
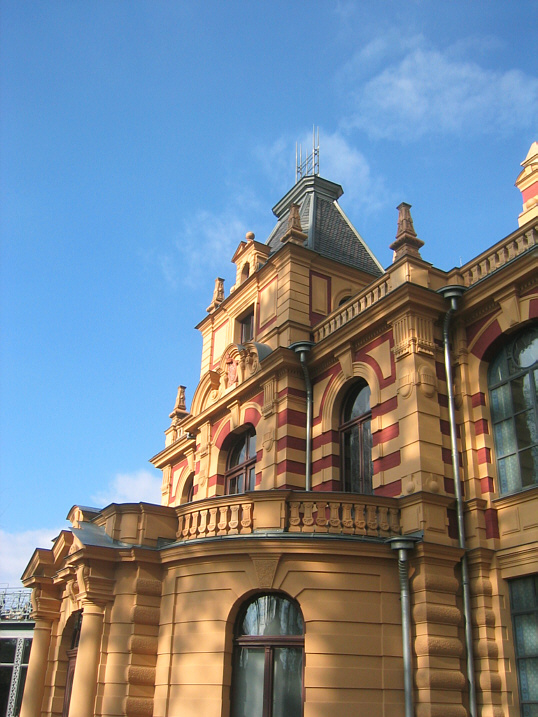
Augsburger Kurhaus, once a wellness center, now a mixed-use municipal building.

The area surrounding the banks of the Wertach is known to have been settled since at least the Bronze Age during the Hallstatt culture, and evidence of settlements and burials in the area date back to between the 1st and 4th centuries AD. It is thought that the aqueduct which supplied Augsburg in Roman time drew its water from the Wertach in this area, and traces of an ancient Roman road have been found in the area. Nearly 4 km (2.4 mi) the Allgäu Road which connected Augsburg with Kempten im Allgäu before crossing the Alps ran through the district, taking the path of the current day streets of Roman Way and Göggingen Street, a milestone can be found just to the south of the district border in Inningen. After the end of the Roman Empire, the area was settled by the Allamanni tribes, and the first historical mention of Göggingen is a reference to "Geginga" in the annals of Ulrich of Augsburg in 969.

Göggingen was the seat of the provincial court and governmental offices from 1804 to 1862. Because of the early orthopedic techniques of Friedrich Hessing, Göggingen's reputation was changed from that of a mere suburb of Augsburg to a regional center of medicine; the medical supplies factory in the district was the biggest employer in the area until the 1970s. In 1954 Göggingen became a major sponsorship center for German citizens of Nejdek, Czechoslovakia, who were expelled by the Beneš decrees issued by the Czech Parliament in exile after World War II. The commercial district of Göggingen was annexed to Augsburg in 1969. The rest of the district, along with the neighboring (and then independent) cities of Haunstetten, Bergheim, and Inningen were annexed to Augsburg during the comprehensive Bavarian civic division reform of 1972.

== Points of interest ==
- Kurhaus Göggingen - One of the oldest buildings in Göggingen, it was once originally built by pioneering doctor Friedrich Hessing as a wellness center, it is now a multi-use civic building.
- Sankt Georg und Michael (English:Saints George and Michael), Catholic church
- Römerturm - A large tower from the turn of the 19th century with a replica of the Augsburger Quadrant
- Hessing-Stiftung (Hessing Foundation), which maintains clinics for children
- Dr.-Maidl-Villa, one of the oldest buildings in Göggingen, Wolfgang Amadeus Mozart was a frequent guest of the upper class owners
- Göggingen is also home to two Grundschulen, a Realschule, and a Hauptschule, as well as two local sport unions.
