= Bargebur =

- Stadtteil of Norden
- Location of Bargebur within the borough of Norden
- Interactive map of Bargebur
- Location within Germany Location within Lower Saxony
- Coordinates: 53°35′45″N 07°13′44″E
- Country: Germany
- State: Lower Saxony
- Town: Norden

Area
  - Total: 0.648 km^{2} (0.250 sq mi)

Population (2016-12-31)
  - Total: 493
  - Density: 761/km^{2} (1,970/sq mi)
- Time zone: UTC+01:00 (CET)
  - Summer (DST): UTC+02:00 (CEST)
- Postal codes: 26506
- Dialling codes: 04931

Bargebur is an urban quarter in the east of the borough of Norden, northwestern Germany, and has a population of around 500 (as at 12/2016), who inhabit an area of just 0.65 km². The houses of Bargebur have been entirely absorbed within the built-up area of Norden. In the south of the quarter, separated by the B72, which acts as a ring road around Norden here, is the Tidofelder Holz, a forest in the neighbouring municipality of Lütetsburg. Along the Fehn Canal runs the so-called Verschönerungsweg. On old maps Bargebur is also called Bergum or Westekelbur.

== Geschichte ==
Nordern's townsfolk refused to allow the reformed Christians to build their church within the then urban area. As a result, the Count of Lütetsburg, Dodo II of Innhausen and Knyphausen, allowed them to do so on his territory, which adjoined the municipal boundary. The town of Nordern made the construction of the church more difficult by making raids, which caused material damage, until the reformed Christian, Grand Elector Frederick William of Brandenburg, who had occupied Greetsiel at this time, sent troops there in 1684, who protected the construction.

On 1 July 1972, Bargebur, which had belonged to the municipality of Lütetsburg until then, was incorporated into the town of Norden.

== Sights ==
- Evangelical-Reformed Bargebur Church
- Historic miller's house (meeting place)
