= Johann Schröder =

Johann Schröder may refer to:

- Johann Schröder (physician) (1600–1664), German physician and pharmacologist, recognised that arsenic was an element
- Johann Heinrich Schröder (1784–1883), banker
- Johann Schröder (mathematician) (1925–2007), German mathematician
