= Albrechts of Rothenburg ob der Tauber =

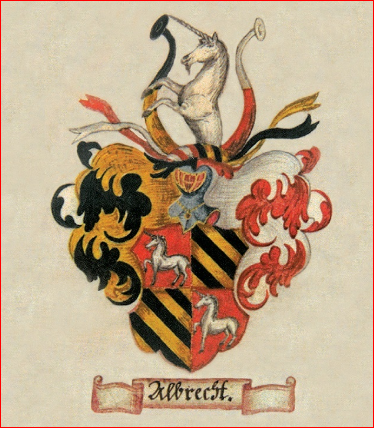
Coat of arms of the Albrecht of Rothenburg ob der Tauber family

The Albrecht of Rothenburg ob der Tauber was a patrician family, many of whose members occupied administrative offices in both the Interior and Exterior Councils that governed the Imperial Free City of Rothenburg ob der Tauber during the second half of the Holy Roman Empire. In addition to performing various judicial, religious and administrative roles in their home city, several Albrechts also wrote University theses that contributed, in the wider context of defining German national identity, to Law and Legal Theory during the years that spanned the Protestant Reformation, the Thirty Years War, the war's aftermath, and the German Enlightenment.

== The Albrechts of Rothenburg 1493-1806 ==
=== Protestant Reformation ===
Georg Albrecht, son of Eucharius Albrecht (born ca. 1461), attended first the University of Leipzig (enrolled ca. 1513) and then Wittenberg University, now the Martin Luther University of Halle-Wittenberg (enrolled 28 September 1517). One of Georg's tutors at Wittenberg was Thomas Müntzer who met with Martin Luther in Spring 1517 and participated in discussions which are considered influential in Luther posting his Ninety-five Theses on 31 October 1517 thereby sparking the Protestant Reformation, one of the effects of which would be to question obedience to clerical authority and thereby facilitate humanist efforts towards what would become the fields of modern science and philosophy.

The Reformation and a new emperor, Charles V (ruled 1519 – 1556), considerably destabilized the religious and economic balance of the Holy Roman Empire. The German Peasants' War (1524-5) saw Eucharius, Georg's father, appointed by the Rothenburg city council to head a committee for negotiating with the rebels in Spring 1525. The Peasants Revolt was eventually put down by Casimir, Margrave of Brandenburg-Bayreuth in a campaign which included a decisive victory at Rothenburg itself, after which, it was said, the city's market squares ran red with the blood of the beheaded rebels. As a consequence, the Rothenburg city elders adopted a low profile, avoiding attracting imperial attention while at the same time remaining on good terms with the staunchly Catholic emperor. Despite this, in 1544, Rothenburg ob der Tauber adopted Lutheranism as its official religion. The Peace of Augsburg (1555) brought a relative calm between Protestants and Catholics in the Holy Roman Empire that would last into the second decade of the following century. .

Kilian Albrecht (ca.1500-1574), grandson of Eucharius Albrecht, was Sheriff and then Bailiff of Gebsattel from April 1555. He was elected to the Interior council of Rothenburg in 1565, the first Albrecht family member to hold an administrative role. In 1596 his son, Leonhard (ca.1550-1613), married Maria Magdalena Forst, daughter of Michael Forst, the wealthy Vogt of Comburg. The close relationship between Leonhard Albrecht and Michael Forst resulted in the granting of an Albrecht coat of arms in 1605, as noted in Johann Siebmacher's Groβes Wappenbuch. Leonhard was also a member of Rothenburg's Exterior Council. In 1603, Leonhard and Maria Magdalena produced a son, Georg Albrecht (1603-1666). Leonhard Albrecht died on 19 January 1613.

=== Thirty Years War ===
The Thirty Years War broke out in 1618 after the incumbent Holy Roman Emperor, the Catholic Ferdinand II, decided to curb the growing Protestant influence within his borders. Georg Albrecht (1603 – 1666) had lost his father, Leonhard, at age 9, but his mother Maria Magdalena's remarriage to Bernhard Betzold, another member of Rothenburg's Interior Council, ensured the boy continued to be well connected and educated. Georg went first to the University at Altdorf and then onto the University of Strasbourg where he studied under the polymath Matthias Bernegger (1582–1640). Georg Albrecht's political-legal thesis, De Judiciorum Cura Politica, was submitted at Strasbourg in 1624. In it can be felt all the tension of the Zeitgeist prevalent just six years after the outbreak of the Thirty Years War, in that it exhibits a strong influence from the French jurist and political philosopher, Jean Bodin (1529–1596) with his preference for strong and centralised state government, yet is tempered by the strong humanitarian tendencies of the staunchly protestant Bernegger.

After moving in influential Lutheran circles in Strasbourg and Tübingen, Georg Albrecht returned to war-torn Rothenburg ob der Tauber. By the end of the war, the Protestant-aligned city had been besieged in 1631 and attacked in 1634 by Catholic forces, and then attacked again in 1645 by French Protestants, and finally occupied by Swedish forces who stayed until 1650, two years after the hostilities had officially ended. Georg became a member of Rothenburg's Exterior Council (1628), the Interior Council (1632), a tax official (1633), the school and church council (1634), and holder of the Würzburg fiefs (1635, 1644, and 1657 onward), the last appointment of which led to a change in the Albrecht family coat of arms. Georg Albrecht also held the mayoralty of Rothenburg three times (1658, 1660, 1663).

Georg and his wife Susanna (wedded in 1627) had eight children together. Georg Albrecht died in the early hours of 6 February 1666. He was survived by three of his daughters and two sons.

=== Aftermath of the Thirty Years War ===
Georg Albrecht's two surviving sons were Andreas Conrad (b. 1635) and Johann Georg (1629–1703). Johann Georg was a poet, musician, and legal scholar, who held the title of Legal Counsel for Rothenburg for 49 years (1654 – 1703). He studied first at the University of Strasbourg (1648) and thereafter at the University of Altdorf where, in 1654, he completed his doctoral thesis under the guidance of Prof. Nicola Rittershus and Dr. Wilhelm Ludwels. The thesis, submitted for inclusion in a Codex Mandati at the University of Altdorf, discusses a single aspect of Law, that of the cessio or on-selling of a legal action to a third party for the purposes of recovering a debt. It is a technical thesis that highlights the way unscrupulous contemporary legal parties were ‘mangling’ the laws of the ancient Roman emperors Anastasius and Justinian that had originally been enacted to protect the debtor. The subject matter of the thesis is relevant to its context in the period immediately following the end of the Thirty Years War, as the hostilities had seriously destabilized the economic infrastructure of the Holy Roman Empire and cash-flow had all but dried up.

The (by then) Dr. Johann Georg Albrecht's 49-year tenure as Legal Counsel to the Imperial Free City of Rothenburg ob der Tauber was virtually contemporaneous with that of the Holy Roman Emperor, Leopold I (reigned 1658–1705). It was a period of relative internal calm for Europe, during which the Ottoman Turk incursions into Europe were finally halted in a decisive battle outside Vienna in 1683. While Leopold brought stability to the Empire as a whole, Dr. Johann Georg Albrecht was sorting out the damaged and neglected City Archives in war ravaged Rothenburg.

Dr. Johann Georg Albrecht had married Anna Magdalena Walther in 1655. Together they had seven children, only three of whom survived their parents: Johann Georg Albrecht (1657–1720), Johann Jeremias Albrecht (1658–1708), and Johann Adam Albrecht (1661–1716). Johann Jeremias became the Hospital Master for the Rothenburg Council, Johann Adam became the Rothenburg parish priest of Schmerbach, and Johann Georg followed in his father's footsteps by studying and practising Law.

=== German Enlightenment ===
Johann Georg Albrecht (1657–1720) studied first at the University of Altdorf and then sought his license to practise Law at the Royal Saxon University of Jena where, amongst other masters, he was taught by Georg Adam Struve (1619-1692), Chair of Law at the university, City Councillor to the City of Braunschweig, and Privy Councillor to the Dukes of Saxony-Weimar. The extant copy of Johann Georg's Dissertatio Civilis et Canonica de Succesione Conjugum, Collegiorum et Fisci or Civil and Canonical Dissertation on the Succession of Spouses, Colleges, and the State Treasury, submitted at Jena in 1677, appears to have transmitted in a truncated (and, possibly, slightly corrupted) state. Distortions aside, this discussion considers the various scenarios under which spouses and relatives may inherit from one another as well as when it is lawful for professional colleges or even the State Treasury to step in and take a slice. The dissertation discusses the problems faced by female beneficiaries and also highlights how inheritance law differed between Germanic states within the Holy Roman Empire at the time. Johann Georg Albrecht's dissertation is representative of the wider groundswell of the German Enlightenment as German lawmakers sought to make sense of antiquated Roman Law in the dawning Age of Reason. Albrecht's supervisor, Georg Adam Struve, was considered amongst the most influential figures in the particularly German movement known as the usus modernus pandectarum or Modern Application of the Pandectae, which was geared to modernising the application of the Roman Law System that had been based on the original Roman Digest. It was Struve's work, the Iurisprudentia Romano-germanica Forensis that was to become the standard reference text for students, teachers, judges, and advocates of German Law and enjoy 31 reprints between 1670 and 1771.

Johann Georg Albrecht was appointed as a Councillor in Rothenburg ob der Tauber in 1681 and then elected Mayor in 1682. In 1686 he was elected Tax Official, a role he performed for the next 11 years. He was later appointed Assessor of the Interior Council (1697), Middle Tax Official (1701), and Governing Mayor (1702). After those appointments he became Highest Tax Official, Curator of the Hospitals and Convents, and Land Vogt. He died peacefully on Thursday, 29 August 1720.

Johann Georg Albrecht had married Margaretha Dorothea Sauber on 2 December 1679. Together they had eleven children only three of whom reached adulthood: Johann Christoph (1680–1751), David Christoph (1690-1740), and Euphrosyna Lucia. The daughter, Euphrosyna Lucia, married Johann Schrag, a member of Rothenburg's Exterior Council, but both sons followed in their father's footsteps by first reading Law at university and then taking on civic responsibility in Rothenburg ob der Tauber.

Johann Christoph Albrecht (1680–1751) initially studied philosophy, physics, and politics under Professor Treuner at the University of Jena but left to study Law at the University of Halle where he came under the supervision of Christian Thomasius (1655 – 1728), a key figure in the German Enlightenment. Thomasius was the first lecturer to teach in German not Latin and was consequently excommunicated by The Pope. He held controversial views on a number of subjects including interdenominational marriage and the persecution of witches, and he championed the view that applying the letter of Roman Law to practices that arose from peculiarly German traditions and behavioural patterns was not only misleading but entirely inaccurate. Johann Christoph Albrecht's Dissertatio Iuris Gentium Privati de Arrhis Em(p)tionum or Dissertation on the Law of Nations (Pertaining to the Individual) Concerning the Guarantee of Purchases was submitted at the University of Halle on 9 September 1702. It discusses the Latin word arrha and how it had been misapplied to a variety of sale and purchase transaction ‘guarantees’ across several German states from the time of the Visigoths through to the early 1700s, and was, therefore, an example of why Latin legal terms as espoused in the Roman Law Pandectae had no place in German States that were striving towards a national self-identity.

Johann Christoph returned to Rothenburg ob der Tauber in 1703. There, he was elected to the Council (1704), became Mayor (1707), Lieutenant-in-Charge of the War Deputation (1711), and was elected to the office of Judge (1713). After his father's death in 1720 he also took over the office of Bank Manager in the Inner Council. He became Head of the War Office (1724), Captain of the Citizens’ Guard (1732), Middle Tax Official (1733), and Governing Consul (1736). At other times he was elected Highest Tax Official, Curator of the Hospital and of the Convent, Highest War Official, Consistor, Scholarcha, and regional Land Vogt.

Johann Christoph Albrecht wed three times. The first marriage, in 1703, was to Dorothea Sophie Hochstätter who died a year later, leaving behind a young daughter, Cordula Barbara Sophia. The second marriage, in 1707, was to Maria Eleonara Kraussenberger with whom he begat 5 children, two of whom survived childhood. The third marriage, in 1736, was to Margaretha Barbara Sinold (née Jos) with whom, in 1739 he had a daughter, Sabina Euphrosina, who died that same year, followed a year later by her mother. Johann Christoph Albrecht himself died on Monday, 8 March 1751. Johann Christoph Albrecht's younger brother, David Christoph Albrecht (1690-1740), attended the University of Halle between 1708–1711 where he read philosophy, natural law, and private and canon law. His thesis De efficientia Metus tum in promissionibus liberarum gentium tum etiam hominum privatorum, auxiliisque contra metum or Concerning the Effect of Fear (in the sense of pressure or force) on Contracts between Free Peoples as well as Private Citizens, and Aids against Fear exists today in the form of a Disputationsschrift in which David Christoph Albrecht defended his work against his Doctoral Supervisor, Professor Nicolaus Gundling. After University, David Christoph followed a patron to Vienna where he worked as a solicitor in the office of the Imperial Privy Councillor, von Praun, before returning to Rothenburg ob der Tauber in 1716 to take up the role of Registrar. He became an actuary in 1722 and was made Consul in 1724.

In 1717, David Christoph Albrecht had married Juliana Cordula with whom he had 6 children, four of whom survived to adulthood. David Christoph died suddenly and unexpectedly in 1740. Johann Christoph Albrecht and David Christoph Albrecht's father, Johann Georg Albrecht (1657–1720), had married again to Maria Christina (née Göttlingk) with whom he begat more sons. Their epitaphs are evidence that they continued the Albrecht family tradition of service to their city, Rothenburg ob der Tauber. Nicolaus Christoph Albrecht (1711-1776) attended the Royal Saxon Academy at Jena where he studied for four and a half years under Reusch, Kőhler, Teichmeyer, and Schmeizel for history and philosophy, under Brunquell and Heimburg for Law, and under Pertsch and Beck for German, Canonical and Feudal Law. After further travels including visits to the three famous Universities of Halle, Wittenberg, and Leipzig, he returned to Rothenburg in 1731, where he held several offices including on the Exterior Council (1733), the Interior Council (1753), Consul in the City Senate (1766), and Land Vogt in the Zwerchmeyer (1773). In 1733, Nicolaus Christoph had married Sophia Maria. The union lasted for almost 24 years until Maria Sophia's death in 1756 and between them they produced seven children, of whom six survived childhood.

Nicolaus Christoph's younger brother, Johann Georg Albrecht (1712-1793), attended the Universities of Jena and Halle between 1732-34 before travelling to Vienna to work with von Praun, the Procurator at the Imperial Court. He returned to Rothenburg ob der Tauber in 1739 where he married Friederike Margaretha (née Walther). Friederike's father, Christoph Augustin Walther, who was a member of Rothenburg's Interior Council encouraged Johann Georg's municipal career as he became first City Archivist, then Actuary (1753), and, later, Assessor to the city's Exterior Council. The only son from the marriage, Georg Daniel Albrecht (1745-1800), went on to become a Senator in Rothenburg's Inner Council.

=== Napoleon Bonaparte ===
Johann Friedrich Gustav Albrecht (1710-1771), the son of Johann Christoph Albrecht (1680-1751), had been granted the title of Hofrat at Rothenburg ob der Tauber by the Margrave of Brandenburg-Ansbach in 1742. One of his sons, Christoph Friedrich Albrecht (1762-1834), studied Law at the University of Erlangen from 1780 before returning to Rothenburg and serving on the city's Exterior Council (1788) but his municipal career was cut short. The declaration of the French Republic in 1792 and execution of that country's king, Louis XVI, in 1793 sent shock waves around Europe. A coalition against France was drawn up and, on 22 March 1793, the Reichstag recognised the need for the Holy Roman Empire to formally declare war on France.

The escalating unrest in Europe, coupled with growing disgruntlement in Rothenburg itself, heralded the end of the status quo. The city's growing bourgeoisie, increasingly encouraged to question by the rapidly spreading German Enlightenment, were asking why the city's top administrative and magisterial positions had remained the exclusive preserve of the same elite patrician families such as the Albrechts for at least the past two centuries, and they tried to force change. But in the end, it didn't matter. The Holy Roman Empire failed to unite against France, with Prussia initially taking a neutral stance, a move which effectively opened the way for French troops under Napoleon to move into Franconia, with Rothenburg itself being occupied in 1796. In 1801, Napoleon and his allies recommended that the Imperial Free Cities of the Holy Roman Empire, Rothenburg amongst them, lose their special status. The final blow to the Albrechts and their patrician allies came on 24 May 1802, when it was decided that Franconia, the province in which Rothenburg was situated, become part of Bavaria. By 2 September of that same year, Bavarian soldiers had occupied the city. Lutheran Rothenburg was now ruled by the Catholic House of Wittelsbach.

Agreements reached on 25 February 1803 saw a massive redistribution of territory within the Holy Roman Empire. The new regime, based in Munich, seeking to address the city of Rothenburg's financial debts, sold off much land owned by its patrician families. Among those who lost out were the Albrechts. Christoph Friedrich Albrecht's career was brought to an end as was that of his relative, Christian Gustav Albrecht (b. 1745), who had held the title of Land Commissioner and who was fired for poor performance. Although some other patrician families attempted to adapt to the new regime and change in political circumstances, the Albrechts never regained their former status in the city.

== The Albrechts of Rothenburg since 1806 ==
The Albrecht family of Rothenburg ob der Tauber's coat of arms can, today, be seen in many places, including a grave memorial in Cape Town, South Africa, the records of the College of Arms, London, and forming the frontispiece of a published history of the family, researched and authored by Nicholas Albrecht, a descendant of the original Albrechts, now domiciled in Auckland, New Zealand.
