= Leybuchtpolder =

- Ortsteil of Norden
- Coat of arms

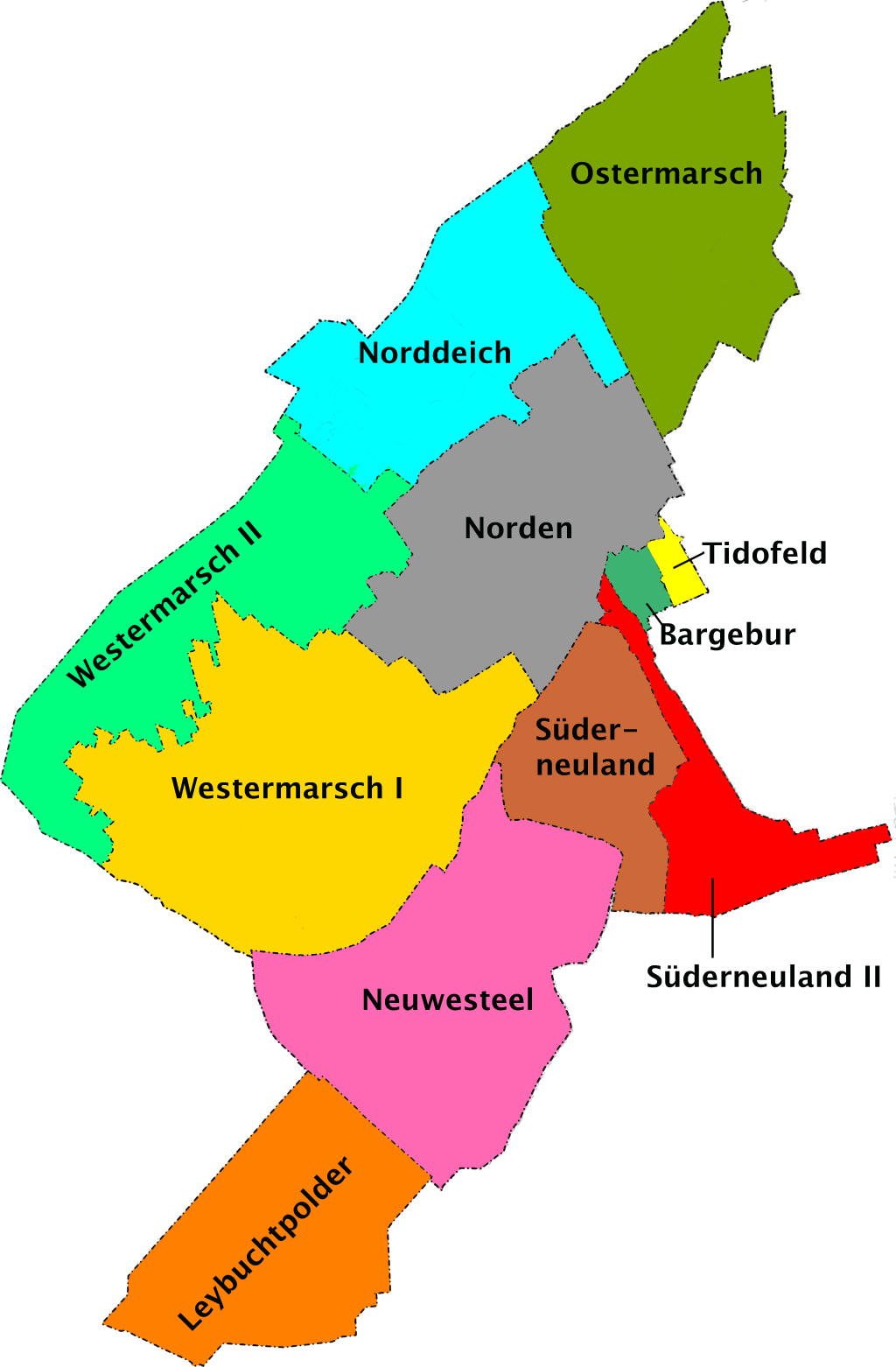
- Location of Leybuchtpolder (orange) in the town of Norden
- Interactive map of Leybuchtpolder
- Location within Germany Location within Lower Saxony
- Coordinates: 53°31′2″N 7°8′37″E
- Country: Germany
- State: Lower Saxony
- District: Aurich
- Town: Norden

Population (2008-12-31)
  - Total: 461
- Time zone: UTC+01:00 (CET)
  - Summer (DST): UTC+02:00 (CEST)
- Postal codes: 26506

Leybuchtpolder is part of the borough of Norden in East Frisia on Germany's North Sea coast and was an independent municipality until 1972. Leybuchtpolder is geologically the most recent of Norden's parishes and has 461 inhabitants. Between 1947 and 1950 the polder was finally reclaimed from the North Sea, when the almost 5 km long Störtebeker Dyke was completed. A monument stands on the spot where the dyke was closed. Administratively Leybuchtpolder is the second most recent parish after Tidofeld, which did not become a separate parish until 1996.
