= Georg Albrecht (mayor) =

Mayor of the Imperial Free City of Rothenburg ob der Tauber (1603–1666)

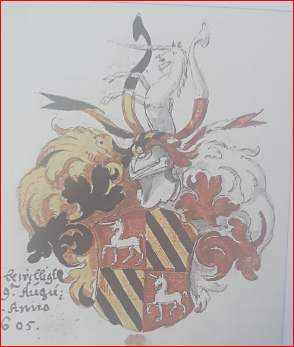
Albrechts of Rothenburg ob der Tauber Family Coat of Arms – 1605

Georg Albrecht (1603–1666) was elected to the office of Mayor of the Imperial Free City of Rothenburg ob der Tauber three times (1658, 1660, 1663). He was a member of the patrician Albrechts of Rothenburg ob der Tauber, many of whose members served in administrative capacities in that city during the second half of the Holy Roman Empire.

== Early life ==
Georg Albrecht was born to Leonhard Albrecht and Maria Magdalena Albrecht (née Forst) on 8 July 1603 in Rothenburg ob der Tauber. Leonhard Albrecht was a member of the Exterior Council of Rothenburg, and Maria Magdalena Albrecht was the daughter of Michael Forst, Vogt of Absberg and bailiff for the Dean of Comburg near Schwäbisch Hall. Leonhard Albrecht died on 19 January 1613 when Georg was only 9 years old, but his mother, Maria Magdalena, remarried to Bernhard Betzold, a member of Rothenburg's Interior Council which ensured that Georg would continue to be well connected.

== Education ==
Georg Albrecht was sent first to the German school in Rothenburg and then, on the advice of his headmaster, to the Latin school, where he completed his secondary education. After commencing his university studies at the University of Altdorf, Georg moved onto the University of Strasbourg, which he entered on 2 June 1621. There, in addition to the political theory of Thucydides and Schönborner, he studied various aspects of law under the polymath Professor Matthias Bernegger (1582–1640). In 1624, Georg submitted a political-legal thesis entitled De Judiciorum Cura Politica which calls for the professionalization and secularization of the legal process within the Holy Roman Empire. Written just six years after the outbreak of the Thirty Years War, Georg Albrecht's thesis conveys the tension of the prevalent Zeitgeist, exhibiting influences from both the French jurist and political philosopher, Jean Bodin (1529–1596), who advocated strong and centralised state government, and the staunchly protestant Bernegger with his humanitarian leanings. Georg's time at Strasbourg (1621–25) and a visit to Tübingen in August 1625 saw him mixing in influential Lutheran circles and making contacts that he would retain after returning to his war-ravaged home of Rothenburg ob der Tauber which was, itself, a Lutheran city.

== Marriage and children ==
A member of Georg Albrecht's step-father's family, Johann Betzold (a former Mayor of Rothenburg), facilitated Georg's own marriage to Susanna Husel, daughter of Conrad Husel, a member of Rothenburg's Interior Council, and Maria Salome Husel who was the step-daughter of another of Rothenburg's former Mayors, Georg Nusch. Johann Betzold also became godfather to Georg and Susanna's eldest son, Johann Georg Albrecht, who was born on 25 February 1629. Georg and Susanna had eight children in total – four sons and four daughters – of which five (Anna Charia b. 5 October 1627, Susanna Margaretha b. 28 January 1642, Maria Magdalena b. 12 August 1643, Andreas Conrad b. 30 November 1635, and Johann Georg b. 25 February 1629) outlived their father.

== Municipal career ==
Upon returning to Rothenburg after completing his university studies, Georg Albrecht was earmarked as a potential future leader, being identified as a 'First-grade Future Dignitary' in 1627, the year of his marriage to Susanna Husel. In 1628 he was appointed to Rothenburg's Exterior Council in which office he performed the function of Assessor of the local peasant court. In 1632 he was appointed to Rothenburg's Interior Council and, a year later, in 1633, Georg was elected to the position of Middle Tax Official, a role he was to hold for the next 25 years. In 1634 he was appointed Consistor and Scolarcha, the office responsible for introducing all pastors and clerics to their communities both in the city of Rothenburg and in its wider regions. He was also responsible for managing communal alms. Georg was granted the Würzburg fiefs for two separate years (1635 and 1644) before being handed both them and the Imperial fiefs on an ongoing basis from 1657, after which year he was officially recognised and received by the government of the incoming Holy Roman Emperor, Leopold I. That recognition was also the catalyst for the upgrade of the Albrecht family coat of Arms to include the Spangenhelm or helmet braces.

In 1658, Georg was elected Mayor of Rothenburg ob der Tauber for the first time. The same year, he also became Hospital Manager, holder of a Wildbann (a royal hunting privilege granted during the Holy Roman Empire), and, again, Manager of the Communal Alms. In 1659 the city council appointed him Vogt and Ober-Steurer, and, in 1660, he was made Manager of Monasteries and elected Mayor for the second time. Georg Albrecht's third election to Mayor came three years later, in 1663.

== Death and burial ==
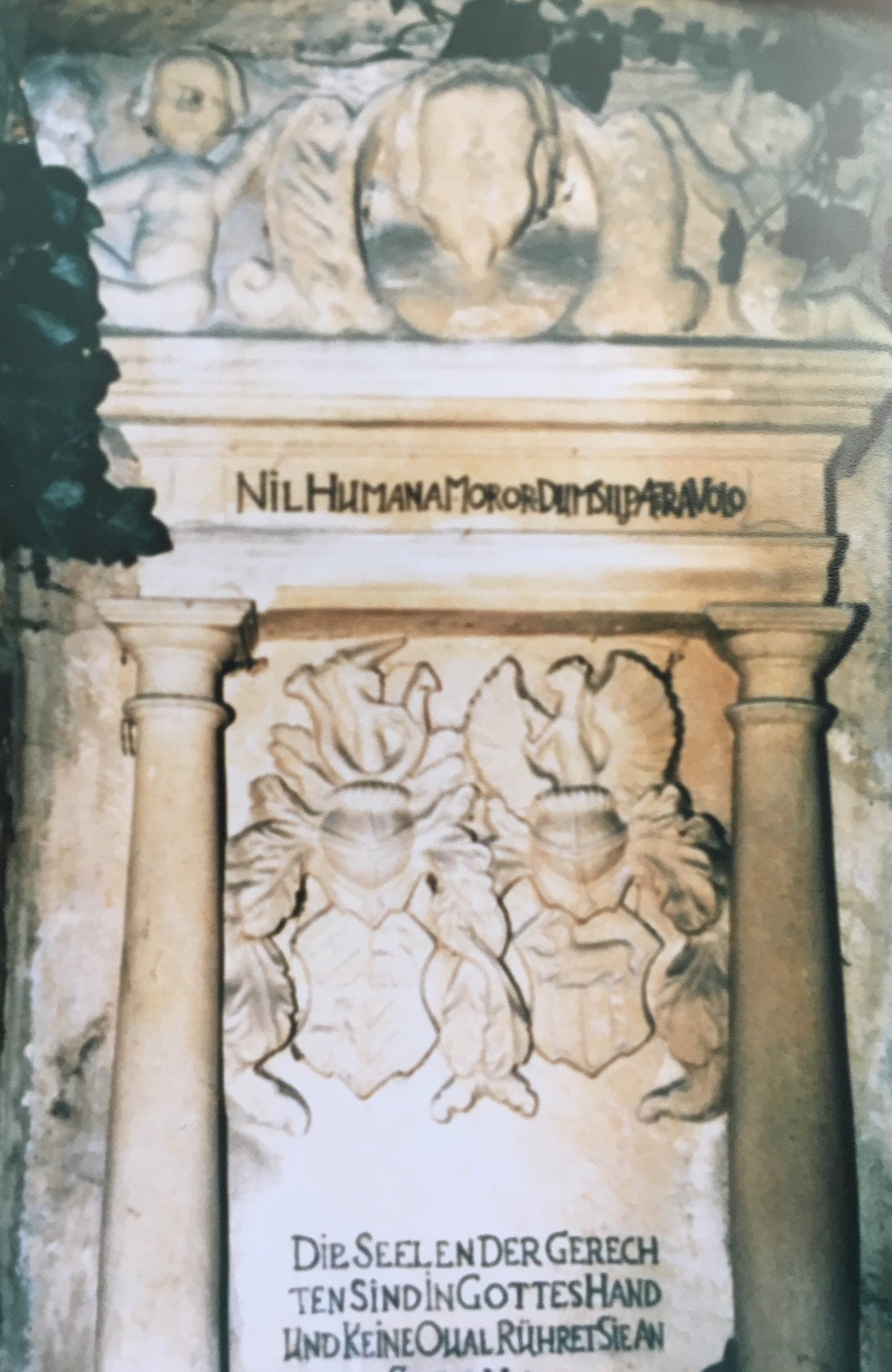
Albrecht-Husel Memorial – Alter Friedhof, Rothenburg ob der Tauber

At lunch on Monday 5 February 1666, Georg Albrecht started to experience indigestion which was followed by difficulty speaking. That first episode passed and, in the afternoon, he carried on with his civic duties as a tax officer. Later on, he was required at the city Registry and there he suffered a serious stroke and was carried home by his son, the – by then – Dr. Johann Albrecht, and the Registry Officer, Johann Nusch. In the early hours of the following morning – before 4 am on Tuesday 6 February 1666 – Georg Albrecht died. He is buried alongside his wife Susanna (d. 1682) in the Alter Friedhof – or Old Cemetery – in Rothenburg ob der Tauber.

Georg Albrecht's legacy to his home town is summed up in the last lines of his epitaph:

And that God may inspire more people like him who can lead us and who can put
God's honour and the edification of church and school first, and look seriously after our
common gain and prosperity so that we can lead a quiet life and
finally may be happy for ever in Christ, Amen.
