= Burkhard Gotthelf Struve =

German librarian and historian

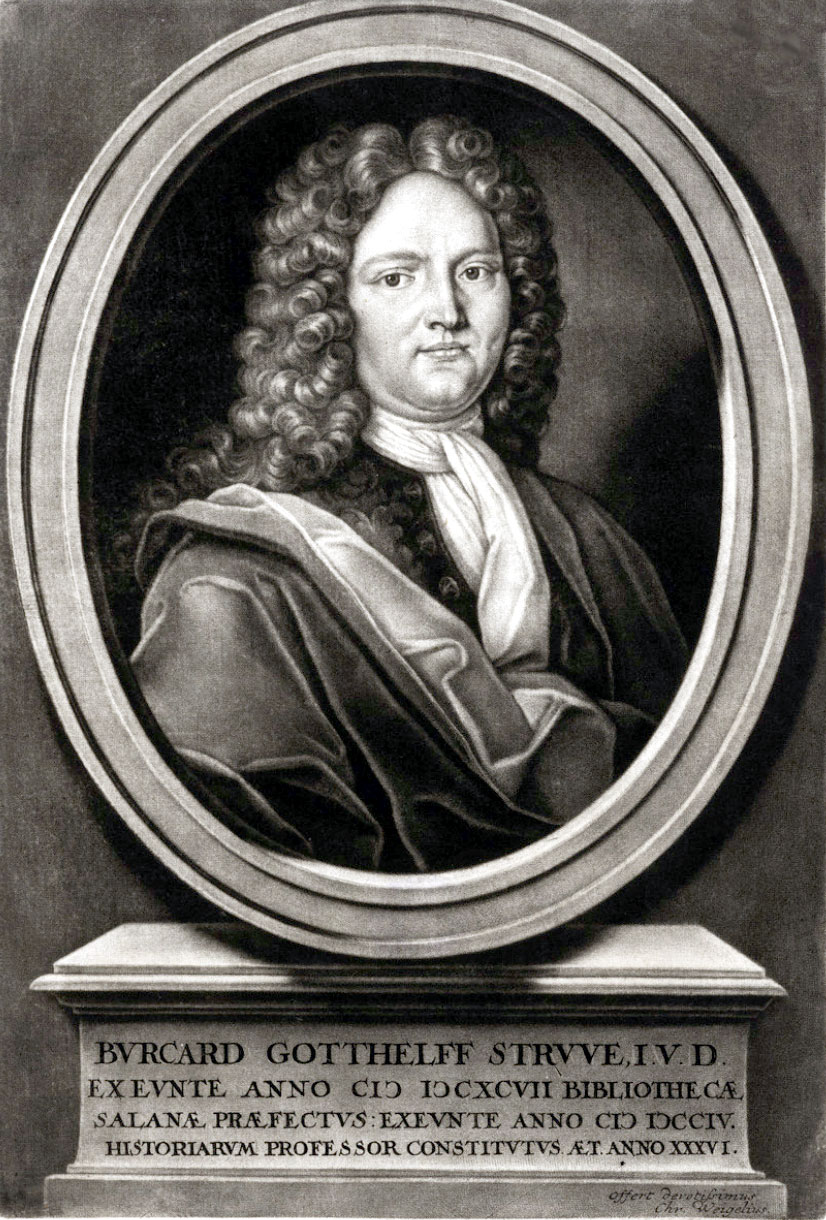
- engraving: Christoph Weigel the Elder, ca. 1704
- Born: 26 May 1671; Weimar
- Died: 25 May 1738 (aged 66); Jena
- Education: University of Jena
- Occupations: Historian; Librarian; University teacher
- Spouse(s): 1. Anna Elisabeth Bertram; 2. Anna Elisabeth Stender; 3. Marie Sophie Kettner; (a widow, born Marie Sophie Hansen)
- Parent(s): Georg Adam Struve (1619-1692); Susanne Berlich

Burkhard Gotthelf Struve (26 May 1671 - 25 May 1738) was a scholarly German librarian who became a polymath-historian based, for most of his academic career, at the University of Jena.

== Life ==
Struve was born in Weimar, his mother's second son. His father, who also had a family from a previous marriage, was a lawyer and at the time of his birth a Privy counciller (Hofrat) at the court in Weimar, Georg Adam Struve. The father had held a teaching professorship at Jena since 1672, and the son received his early schooling privately, some of it at home.

When he was just 16 Burkhard Gotthelf Struve enrolled at the University of Jena where he learned about philosophy, politics, history and jurisprudence. His teachers included J. J. Müller , J. A. Schmidt and G. Schubart, although sources stress that he had been a bibliophile from an early age, and where he did not agree with his teachers he would undertake his own research, so that in many matters he was self-educated even in respect of his time at university. After Jena he spent a period at Helmstedt, learning from the charismatic Heinrich Meibom. Subsequently, he studied briefly at the Viadrina University at Frankfurt, before returning to Jena in 1690.

At home there was further discussion about the direction of his future career. Early in 1691 he moved to Halle where he worked in a law firm, but the work did not suit him and he returned home at Easter. Meanwhile, his elder brother was building a career at The Hague as a Chemist and Alchemist, working for wealthy individuals, and invited Burkhard to join him as an assistant. In The Hague he was able to buy a number of rare books, but then he fell seriously ill and had to leave his brother and return home to Jena. The search for a career resumed, punctuated by bouts of serious illness and, in 1692, the death of his father. His alchemist brother found himself in trouble, accused of dishonesty and imprisoned. Struve was obliged to sell his by-now valuable book collection and sacrifice his paternal inheritance in order to ensure his elder brother's freedom.

In 1697 Struve accepted a post as University Librarian at Jena, for an annual salary of 44 Gulden. He quickly irritated the university teaching staff with his habit of delivering private lectures on German History: these were popular with students. In 1702 he received his doctorate, and the same year the university gave him a teaching certificate. In 1704 he was appointed a professor of history at the University of Jena. Over the next few decades his reputation and eminence grew. In 1712 he was nominated "Sachsen-Weimarischen Rath Historiographus" In 1730 he received the title "Hof-Rath des Hoch-Fürstlichen Sammt-Hauses Sachsen", also adding a professorship in Civil and Contract Law. On three occasions, in 1712 1720 and 1732, he enjoyed the office of University Rector, occupying the office on each occasion for the summer semester.

Burkhard Gotthelf Struve died unexpectedly on 25 May 1738. In Zedler's Great Universal Lexicon in 1744 he was eulogised as one of the greatest polymaths of his time.

== Published output ==
Most of Struve's posthumous reputation rests on his published output. His four volume history first issued in 1712, and subsequently expanded and reissued as "Corpus historiae Germanicae a prima gentis origine ad annum usque 1730" was popular, also appearing in German as the "Erläuterte teutsche Reichs-Historie". Three centuries later, it offers intriguing contemporary insights, without being filtered through the prism of nineteenth century nationalism and Prussian hegemony, into the nature of the German self-identity in the Holy Roman Empire.

The work is ambitious in scope, covering in four volumes the history of the German lands from the pre-Roman period to the eighteenth century. The first volume covers the pre-Roman years "in the free German land" ("das freye Teutsch-Land"). It is relatively generalised and short, comprising just 58 paragraphs, and it leans heavily on Tacitus. The second volume deals with the period under Roman rule, starting with the invasions of Julius Caesar and lamenting the failure of the Germans to hang together, which is a recurring theme throughout the four volumes. The third volume covers the emergence and dominance of the Franks, and the fourth volume covers the imperial centuries, beginning with Otto I.
