= Tidofeld =

- Stadtteil of Norden
- Lage von Tidofeld im Stadtgebiet von Norden
- Interactive map of Tidofeld
- Location within Germany Location within Lower Saxony
- Coordinates: 53°35′44″N 07°14′11″E
- Country: Germany
- State: Lower Saxony
- Town: Norden

Area
  - Total: 0.468 km^{2} (0.181 sq mi)
- Elevation: 1 m (3.3 ft)

Population (2016-12-31)
  - Total: 991
  - Density: 2,120/km^{2} (5,480/sq mi)
- Time zone: UTC+01:00 (CET)
  - Summer (DST): UTC+02:00 (CEST)
- Postal codes: 26506
- Dialling codes: 04931

Tidofeld has been an autonomous part of the East Frisian borough of Norden since 1996 and has around 1,000 inhabitants (as at 12/2016)), spread over an area of just 0.47 km². Its built-up area is completely integrated with the town itself. Until 1952, Tidofeld was part of the municipality of Lütetsburg.

== History ==
The name Tidofeld goes back to a schloss that was built here in the 17th century on this site. It was built by Tido, Freiherr of Innhausen and Knyphausen (1582–1638). Freiherr Tido was a brother of Field Marshal Dodo of Innhausen and Knyphausen.

Tidofeld gained particular importance from the fact that after the Second World War in a former Wehrmacht barracks (a naval transit camp), a displaced persons camp was established which held 6,000 people and was thus one of the largest camps in Germany. In the middle of the camp a barrack hut was turned into a church building. It was the forerunner of the Church of Grance (Gnadenkirche) built in 1961 and - after it was deconsecrated - documentation centre.

== Sights ==
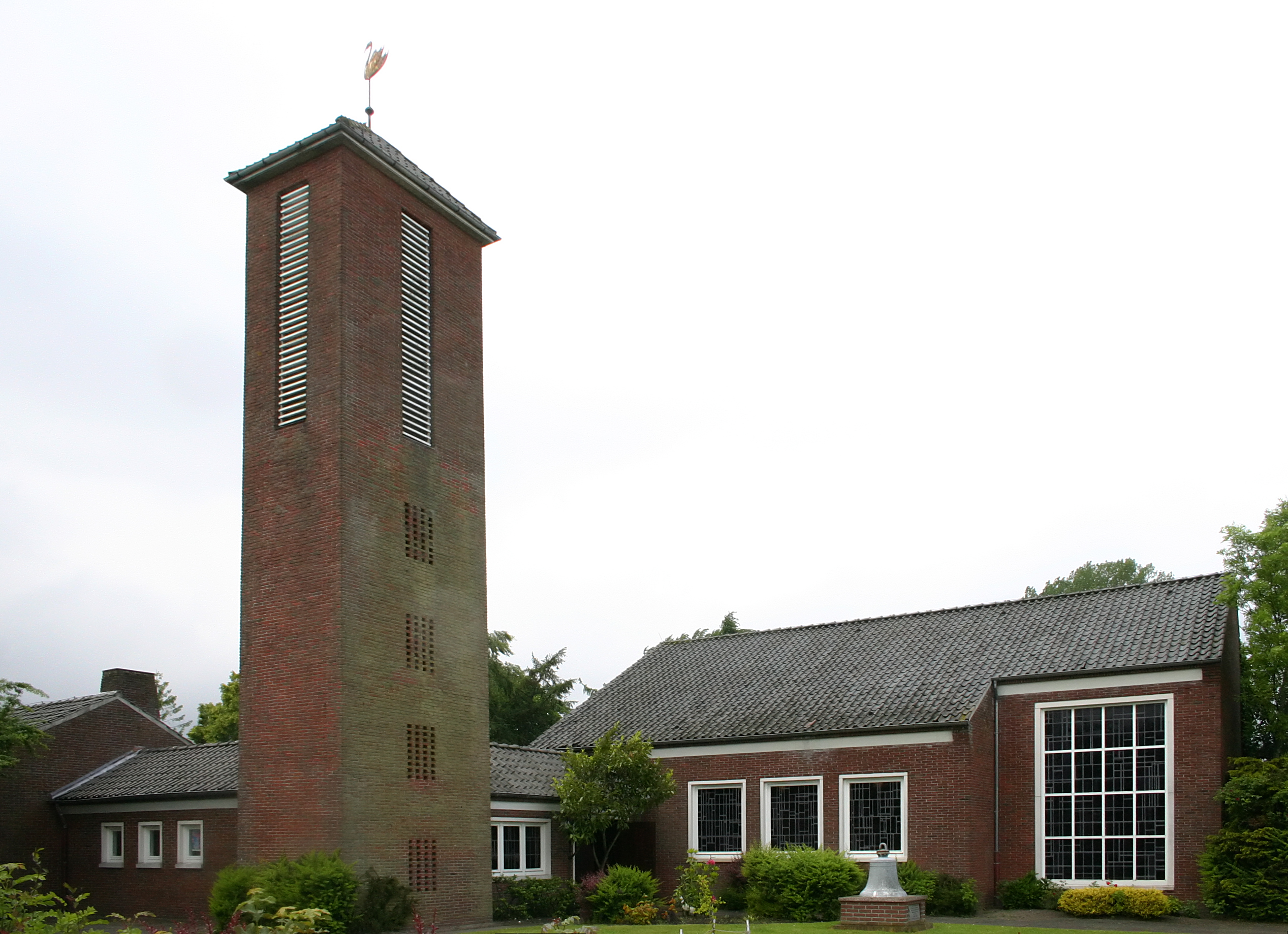
The Church of Mercy, Tidofeld (erbaut 1961), today a documentation centre about the history of the displaced persons

Among the attractions in Tidofeld is a permanent exhibition in the disused Evangelical-Lutheran Church of Mercy, which documents the ethnic cleansing of the former German eastern territories. This project is under the patronage of the former Lower Saxon minister-president, David McAllister. Until she stepped down, Margot Käßmann, former state bishop of the Evangelical-Lutheran State Church of Hanover, was a patroness of the documentation centre.
