= Johann Georg Albrecht =

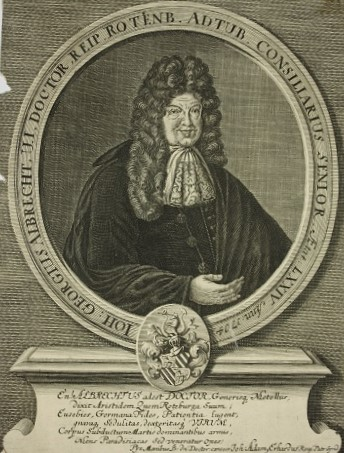
Dr. Johann Georg Albrecht 1629-1703

Johann Georg Albrecht (1629–1703) served in the office of Legal Counsel to the Imperial Free City of Rothenburg ob der Tauber for 49 years (1654–1703). He was a member of the patrician Albrechts of Rothenburg ob der Tauber, many of whose members served in administrative capacities in that city during the second half of the Holy Roman Empire.

== Early life ==
Johann Georg Albrecht was born to Georg Albrecht and Susanna Albrecht (née Husel) on 25 February 1629 in Rothenburg ob der Tauber, eleven years after the outbreak of the Thirty Years War, a period during which much of Europe was plunged into political and religious turmoil. Born into a Lutheran Protestant household, Johann Georg Albrecht was raised with strong Christian values and found comfort for the troubled times in which he spent his childhood by immersing himself in the music of both instrument and voice.

== Education ==
In a period when standard educational practices could be frequently disrupted, Johann Georg Albrecht's parents supplemented his schooling with private tutors. He became an accomplished musician and poet at an early age as evidenced by a work of consolation composed for four voices in honour of the recently deceased Susanna Schnepf (née Ruffer), the godmother of his future wife, Anna Magdalena Walther, and published when Albrecht was just 18 years old:

Do you want to mourn forever / and cry over my death?
Dearest / let yourself not be in sorrow / because I am not distressed any more now.
Pale cheeks / wet eyes / heart and soul full of grief / hurt you / and don’t help me / I feel at ease forever / at ease forever.
Although you might weep over the fact / that I have departed:
However, soothe your yearning / be moderate in it.
To those who have happily run the course of death / Heaven is open / and they can’t return.
What I previously often have desired / and Do you want to mourn forever / and cry over my death?
Wished for every day / I don’t need any more / because I am able to see Christ
Therefore, stop your worrying / grant me my peace now:
Think about the fact / that God can lead you to me again tomorrow.
You should only mourn those / who are snatched away by death quickly / without belief / unawares
And one should never be allowed to complain / if a blessed death saves you in your belief
Snatches and carries you away
And carries you towards heaven

On 12 June 1648, Johann Georg Albrecht enrolled at the University of Strasbourg where, for four years, he studied philosophy and philology under the Rector Melchior Sebizius II (Melchior Sebisch the Younger, 1578-1671) and legal basics under the Professor of Law, Johann Rebhan (1604-1689). During a temporary return to his home town of Rothenburg ob der Tauber, Johann Georg held a private scholarly debate which was supervised by Georg Christoph Walther, a local Counsel and Lawyer, who had both attended the University of Strasbourg with Johann Georg's father, Georg Albrecht, and served with him as a municipal officer on Rothenburg's Inner Council. Johann Georg Albrecht next attended the University of Altdorf. He enrolled on 6 October 1652 in order to continue and complete his law qualifications and studied under Nicolaus Rittershausen (1597-1670) and Wilhelm Ludwels. Albrecht passed his exams, on the strength of which the Rothenburg City Council had already offered him a job as Counsel and Lawyer before he was eventually awarded a doctorate on 26 September 1654.

The thesis itself comprised an explication on Laws XXII and XXIII of a Codex Mandati and is exclusively concerned with the act of cessio - or 'ceding' - in which a legal action to reclaim a debt could be 'ceded' to a third-party (either sold or donated) to pursue on their own behalf. The intent of the thesis appears to be to highlight the malpractice prevalent in its author's contemporary legal environment with respect to the act of cessio and to identify those conditions under which the process might be considered legal versus those under which it might not. In its historical context (six years after the end of the Thirty Years War) the thesis illustrates one of the financial repercussions of that conflict - the shortage of ready money. With respect to the type of cessio in which a creditor would accept as 'payment' (or part-payment) from his own debtor another debt owed to that debtor the author states in Section XXXIII of his thesis, that '. . . few people have the money which they can pay back'. He then goes on to quote Kaspar Manz (also known as Caspar Manzius 1606-1677) as writing 'that we are reduced by the disasters of war to the point where, nowadays, almost more commercial transactions are carried out on paper than with actual money'.

== Marriage and children ==
On 26 June 1655, Johann Georg Albrecht married Anna Magdalena Walther, daughter of Georg Christoph Walther and his wife Margaretha (née Pfisterer). Both the Walther and Pfisterer families, along with the Bezold (Margaretha Pfisterer's mother's surname) family had supplied members to Rothenburg ob der Tauber's Inner Council. The marriage lasted for 48 years, until Johann Georg Albrecht's death, and produced seven children, four sons and three daughters. Four of the children - Georg Christoph, Maria Magdalena, Anna Sophia, and Euphrosina Susanna - predeceased their parents, but the three surviving sons - Johann Georg (1657-1720), Johann Jeremias (1658-1708), and Johann Adam (1661-1716) - lived on. Johann Georg was to follow in his father's footsteps in a legal career, Johann Jeremias became the Hospital Master of the Rothenburg Council and married into the influential von Winterbach family, and Johann Adam became parish priest at Schmerbach, a short distance from Rothenburg itself.

== Municipal career ==
Johann Georg Albrecht was the longest serving Legal Counsel to the Imperial Free City of Rothenburg ob der Tauber, holding the post for 49 years (1654-1703). In wider contemporary terms, the length of his career closely mirrored that of the reigning Holy Roman Emperor, Leopold I (b. 1640 - d. 1708, reigned 1658-1708). What Leopold was attempting to achieve on a broader canvas by bringing order to his religiously divided empire in the aftermath of the internecine Thirty Years War, Johann Georg Albrecht was attempting to emulate on a smaller scale in Rothenburg ob der Tauber. In 1674, using some of the funding generated by dramatically increasing taxation upon the emerging bourgeoisie and tradesperson classes, the Rothenburg City Council voted that Albrecht be made responsible for restoring the extensive city archives which had fallen into a dilapidated state as a result of decades of siege and occupation. His hands on approach to the task is evidenced by the many hand-written addenda to the files in the freshly reorganised Stadtarchiv, an observation that was noted in Albrecht's eventual epitaph. During the early period of the project, Rothenburg, along with the wider region of Franconia was still under the threat of invasion from the Ottoman Turks whose incursions into Europe were only finally halted at a decisive battle outside Vienna in 1683.

== Death and burial ==
A deeply religious man and assiduous churchgoer, Albrecht, now in his seventies, would accompany himself daily on his clavichord as he sang the well-known Lutheran hymn Who Knows How Near To Me My End. On Sunday11 November 1703 he attended mass in the Church of the Franciscans (Franziskanerkirche) on the Herrngasse, Rothenburg ob der Tauber, where he suffered a severe seizure on his right side and became very nauseous. He died later that same day, aged 74 years, eight months and 15 days.

The funeral took place on Wednesday 14 November 1703 at the Cathedral Church of St. Jakob in Rothenburg ob der Tauber. As a prominent citizen, the service for Albrecht was attended by many dignitaries from both the imperial free city itself and the surrounding regions, and, as a patron of the city's music community, a special funeral composition Schwanen-Gesang (Swan Song) was composed and performed in his honour. The entire service, complete with eulogies from eminent contemporary jurisprudents, clergy, and dignitaries has been preserved in published form.
