= Ekel (Norden) =

- Ortsteil of Norden
- Interactive map of Ekel
- Location within Germany Location within Lower Saxony
- Coordinates: 53°36′N 07°13′E
- Country: Germany
- State: Lower Saxony
- District: Aurich
- Town: Norden
- Time zone: UTC+01:00 (CET)
  - Summer (DST): UTC+02:00 (CEST)
- Postal codes: 26506
- Dialling codes: 04931

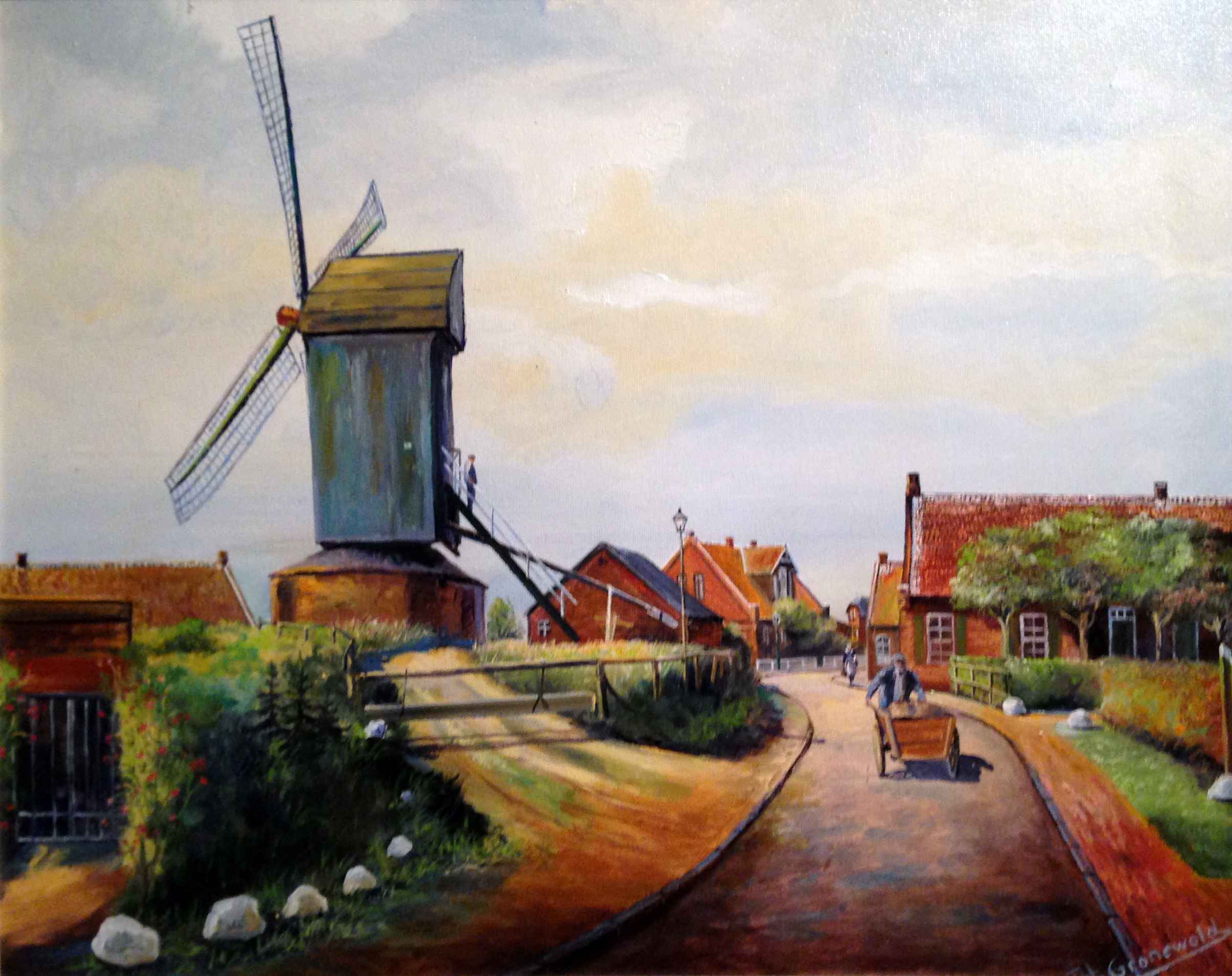
Old oil painting of the Ekel Mill in Norden, East Frisia

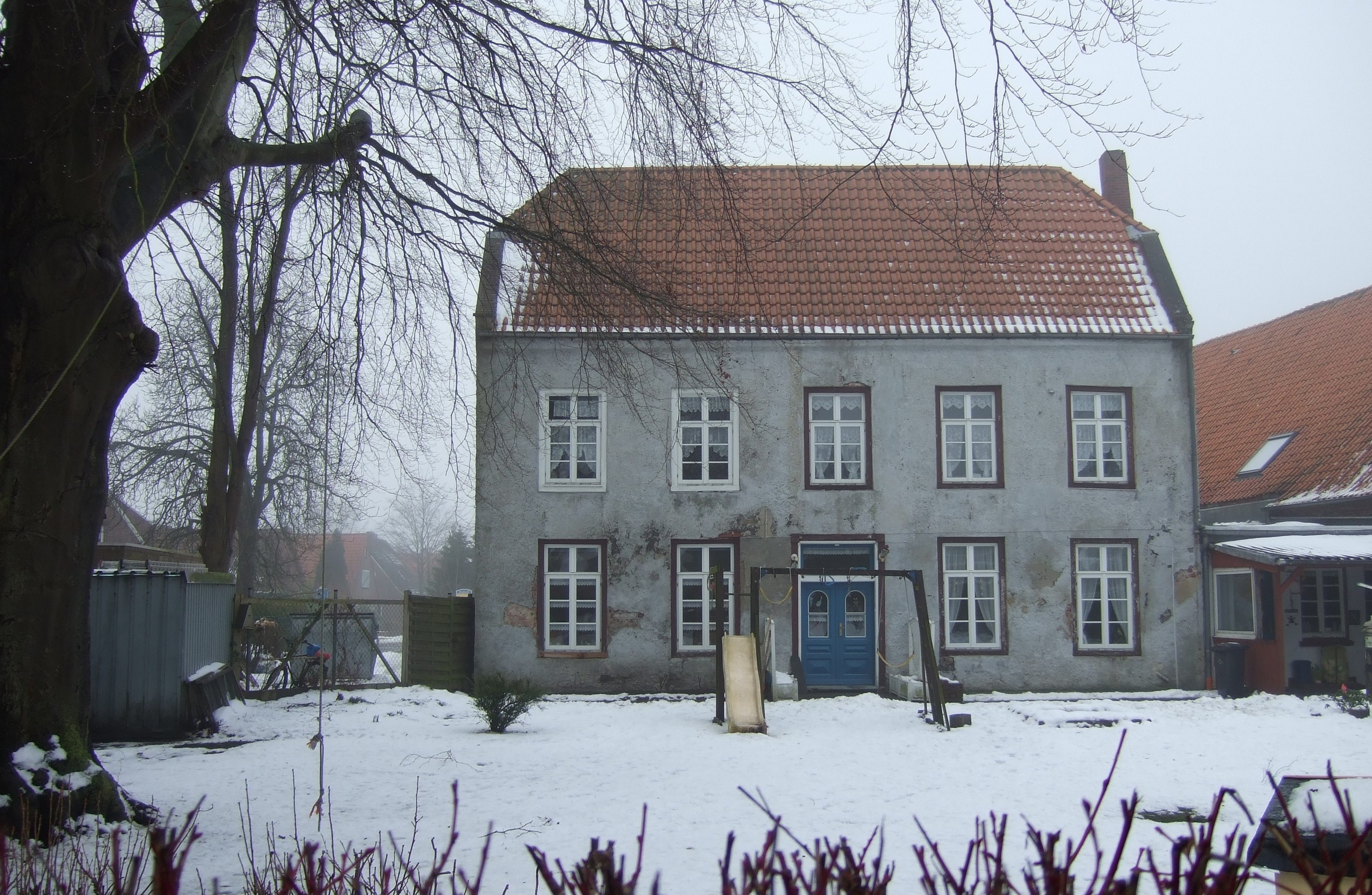
The so-called Ekel Outwork, a 16th-century stone house. Seen from the Langer Pfad.

Ekel is the eastern part of the town centre of Norden. Its name goes back to a Low German description for "acorn" (Eichel) or "oak grove" (Eichengehölz), which gave its name to a medieval fortified house (Wehrhaus) about 800 metres northeast of the big market place. Later a private estate and then part of the agriculturally dominated Norden environs, in the 20th century Ekel quickly merged with Norden as a result of new housing estates and was finally incorporated in 1919.

== Geography ==
Because Ekel was never an independent administrative unit, but was only a placename used in everyday language, it has no defined boundaries. It can be seen that many new estates relate to the name, Ekel, that do not lie on the land once owned by the historical estate (eastern part Ekeler Weg, Ekeler Land). Today's understanding is that the town quarter of Ekel is roughly bounded by the Norder Tief stream in the southeast, the B 72 federal highway in the northeast and the railway line to the southwest that cuts through the town. To the northwest it is more difficult to define a boundary, the nearest of the medieval fortified houses (of which about 15 encircled the town forming a defensive ring) were Haus Barenbusch and Haus Wirde, so that the boundary can be taken as the very old road of Ekeler Gaste which follows the geest ridge.

In the consciousness of the local people, a not unimportant role in the boundary question is the catchment area of the Ekel Primary School, which extends beyond the named area.

== Literature ==
- Ufke Cremer: Norden im Wandel der Zeiten. Im Auftrage der Stadt Norden zur 700-Jahr-Feier herausgegeben, Norden, 1955
- Johann Aeils, Jan Smidt, Martin Stromann: Steinerne Zeugen erzählen Geschichte. Auf Spurensuche nach architektonischen Schätzen der Norder Bauhistorie., Norden, 2001
- Gerhard Canzler: Norden. Handel und Wandel., Norden, 1989
- Gretje Schreiber: Heim und Herd - Beilage Ostfriesischer Kurier. Norden, 8 January 2011
