= Lotharian legend =

Disproven theory concerning the application of Roman law

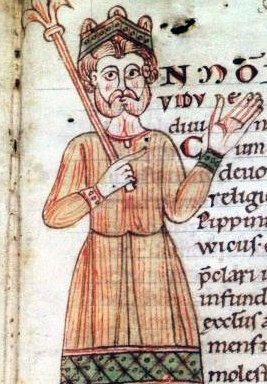
Portrait of Lothair III in the Codex Eberhardi, Princely Abbey of Fulda

The Lotharian legend (Note: "Lotharian legend" is used by Oestmann while "Lothar legend" is used by Jansen.) (German: Lotharische Legende) was a German 16th-century theory which purported to explain why Roman law as outlined in the Byzantine Corpus Iuris Civilis was the law of the Holy Roman Empire (as the ius commune). According to this theory – which was conclusively disproven by Hermann Conring in 1643 – the Holy Roman Emperor Lothair III had commanded in 1137 that Roman law was the law of his empire.

Today, the German Lutheran reformer and theologian Philip Melanchthon is acknowledged as the creator of this legend.

== Lotharian legend ==
=== Background ===
Long after the Western Roman Empire had fallen, the Corpus Iuris Civilis, a 6th-century legal collection of Eastern Roman emperor Justinian I, was the law of the land in vast parts of Europe (as the ius commune). Due to the lack of a tangible explanation why the Corpus Iuris Civilis was the applicable law, different theories were developed during the Late Middle Ages and the beginning of the early modern period to justify its use.

One theory argued with the inherent ratio et aequitas (reason and equity) of Roman law and its inherent spiritual authority. Especially with a view to the Holy Roman Empire, another theory focused on the idea of translatio imperii: According to this concept, the imperial authority of the ancient Roman emperors had been passed on to the Holy Roman emperors. As the purported successors of the Roman emperors, the Holy Roman emperors also carried with them the ancient Roman law.

=== The legend and its authorship ===
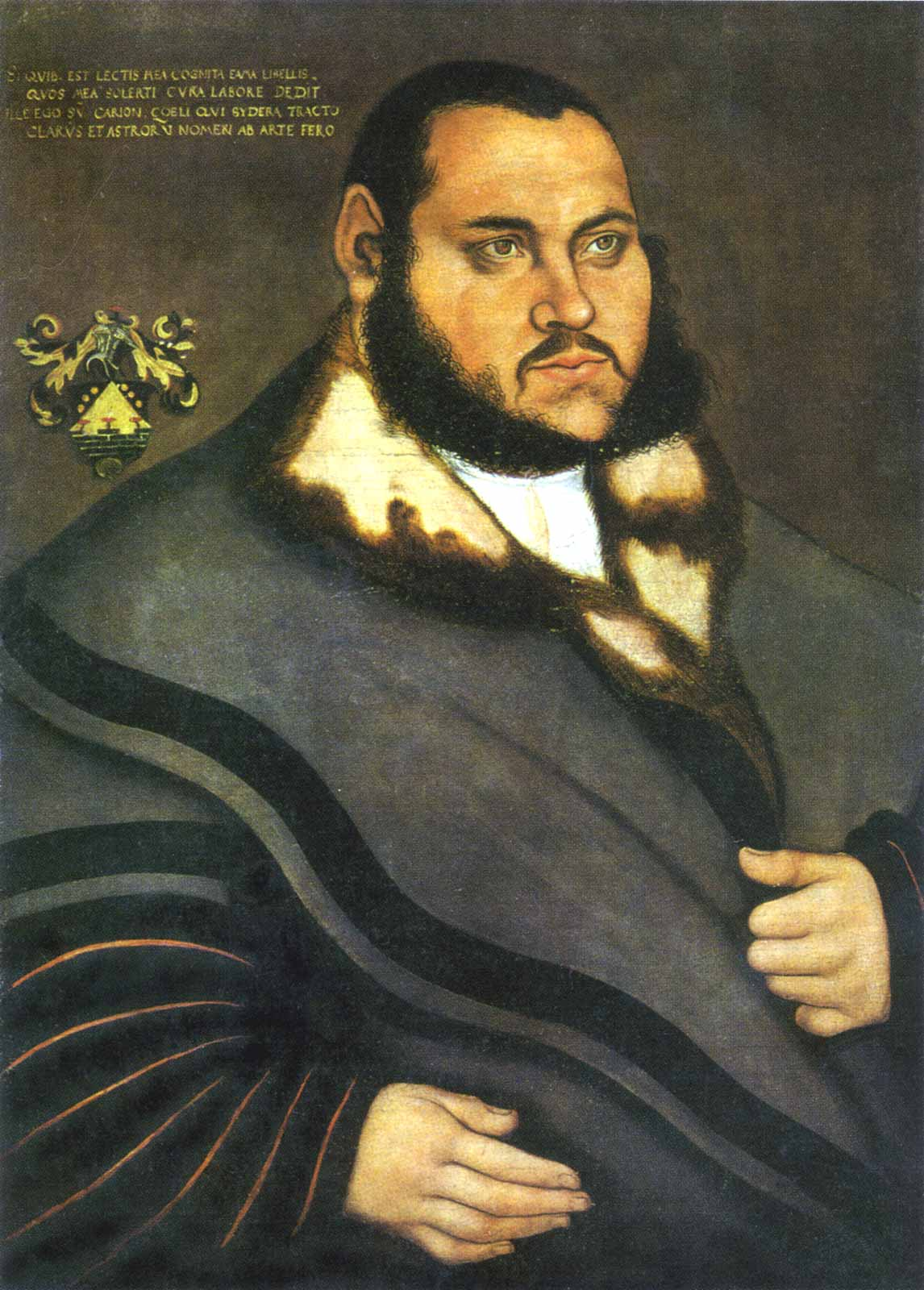
Portrait of Johann Carion by Lucas Cranach the Elder

The Lotharian legend was a further theory to justify the usage of Roman law. Its backdrop formed the second campaign of Lothair III in Italy in 1137. It explained the application of Roman law in the German territories by virtue of a decree by emperor Lothair III.

Johann Carion, the court astrologer to the prince-elector of Brandenburg, Joachim I Nestor, espoused in his 1532 treatise, the Chronica Carionis, the view (Note: 7,25 Wenn die Römischen Recht widder herfur komen sind. Lotharius wird seer gelobet nicht allein von wegen seiner sieg dadurch er Deudsch land vnd Jtalien zu frieden bracht hat sondern auch das er Religion vnd recht seer lieb gehabt hat Zu seiner zeit ist ein gelart man genant Wernherus den Accursius offt nennet Jrnerium jm Reich jnn Jtalia gewesen bey der Fürstin Mechtildis der hat die Römische recht bücher jnn Bibliotheken gefunden vnd widder an das liecht bracht Die hat Lotharius befolen jnn Schulen zu lesen vnd widderumb darnach zu sprechen jnn Keisarlichen gerichten Also ist dieser edel schatz widder herfur komen daraus viel guts geuolget nemlich das man widderumb ein vernünfftig recht jnn gantzem Europa hat Denn es richten sich doch alle land vnd recht nach diesem Römischen recht dieweil man befindet das es der erbarkeit so gantz gemes ist So ist auch sonst viel guts daraus komen) that Emperor Lothair III had commanded the teaching of Roman law in his empire and its application in his courts after Irnerius had rediscovered the Corpus Juris Civilis in the 12th century.

The authorship of the Chronica Carionis is, however, disputed and today the German Lutheran reformer and theologian Philip Melanchthon is considered to be the author of at least parts of it. For the part containing the Lotharian legend, his authorship is clearly established. The textual origin of this idea of Melanchthon remains, nevertheless, unclear. Legal historian Guido Kisch considered the possibility that the Chronicon Urspergensis of Burchard of Ursperg could be its origin because Ursperg's discussion of Irnerius also notes Irnerius' patroness Matilda of Tuscany, but he concedes that this is inconclusive, because the Chronicon does not contain any reference to the alleged imperial decree of Lothair III. Alan Watson simply notes that the legend "was apparently the invention of Phillip Melancthon".

=== Reasons for the formation of the legend ===
Considering the motives of Melanchthon, legal scholar Mathias Schmoeckel argues that theological reflections were decisive for Melanchthon's espousal of the Lotharian legend. For Melanchthon, God wanted laws to govern his people. This law had to be revealed in authoritative texts as it was the case with the Ten Commandments. Customary law as a method of explaining the applicability of the Corpus Juris Civilis did not provide the legal certainty which Melanchthon deemed necessary and could not guarantee that the Corpus Juris Civilis would be applied in total (in complexu).

Legal scholar Nils Jansen remarked that the Lotharian legend was a "political myth" and was not discussed in contemporary legal circles and was thus a project of political legitimization and not a legal argument. He highlights that the legal commentators of the time apparently did not question the applicability of Roman law; for them the applicability of the Corpus Juris Civilis was self-evident and they pragmatically just applied it.

== Refutation by Hermann Conring ==
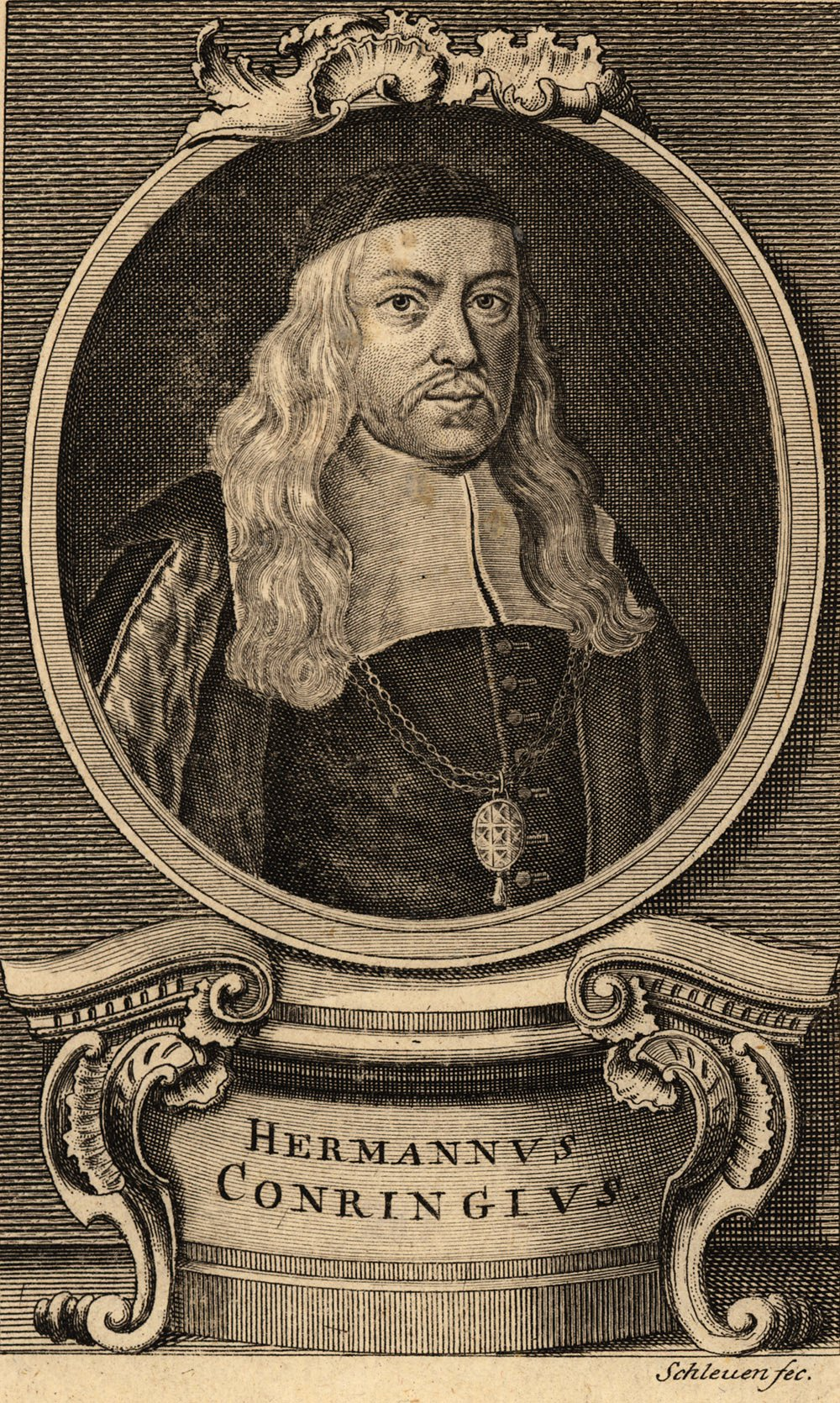
Portrait of Hermann Conring by Johann David Schleuen

Hermann Conring was not the first scholar who attempted to disprove the Lotharian legend. It was refuted earlier by Christoph Lehmann in his chronicle of Speyer (1612). Friedrich Lindenbrog called it a "fantasy" in 1613 and Georg Calixtus criticized it extensively in his 1619 Epitomes Theologiae Moralis.

But the legend was only conclusively disproven by Hermann Conring in chapters 20 and 21 of his 1632 opus magnum De origine iuris Germanici (On the origin of German law). Conring argued that no earlier document existed that contained a trace of the decree of Lothair III. He thus concluded that purported historical events should only be considered to be established as true if they were attested to by credible and near-contemporaneous sources.

But to return to our present task: for those who really consult the old documents, this story of Emperor Lothar obviously not only stands on weak feet, but is completely false. [...] So, because until today no decree, no even slightly older evidence exist, that Lothar rejected the laws in force until then, putting only the Roman ones in their place, it is quite clear how unfounded this commonly spread assertion is.

— Hermann Conring, De origine iuris Germanici

In lieu of an imperial decree Conring's explanation for the applicability of Roman law was that it had been gradually adopted by the courts without a clear commandment to do so. Conring thereby established the modern consensus view of a gradual reception of the ius commune focusing on the fact that in legal education only Roman law was taught and thus trained lawyers had a natural inclination to apply it.

In fact, it can be observed that, partly by a certain tacit habit, partly by decrees of the princes [...], Roman law began to be observed at different times and in different places. Indeed, since the doctors of Roman law were entrusted with the judiciary, it could hardly have happened otherwise that many of them [...] gradually introduced the use of Roman law.

— Hermann Conring, De origine iuris Germanici
