= Norden, Lower Saxony =

Norden
- Town
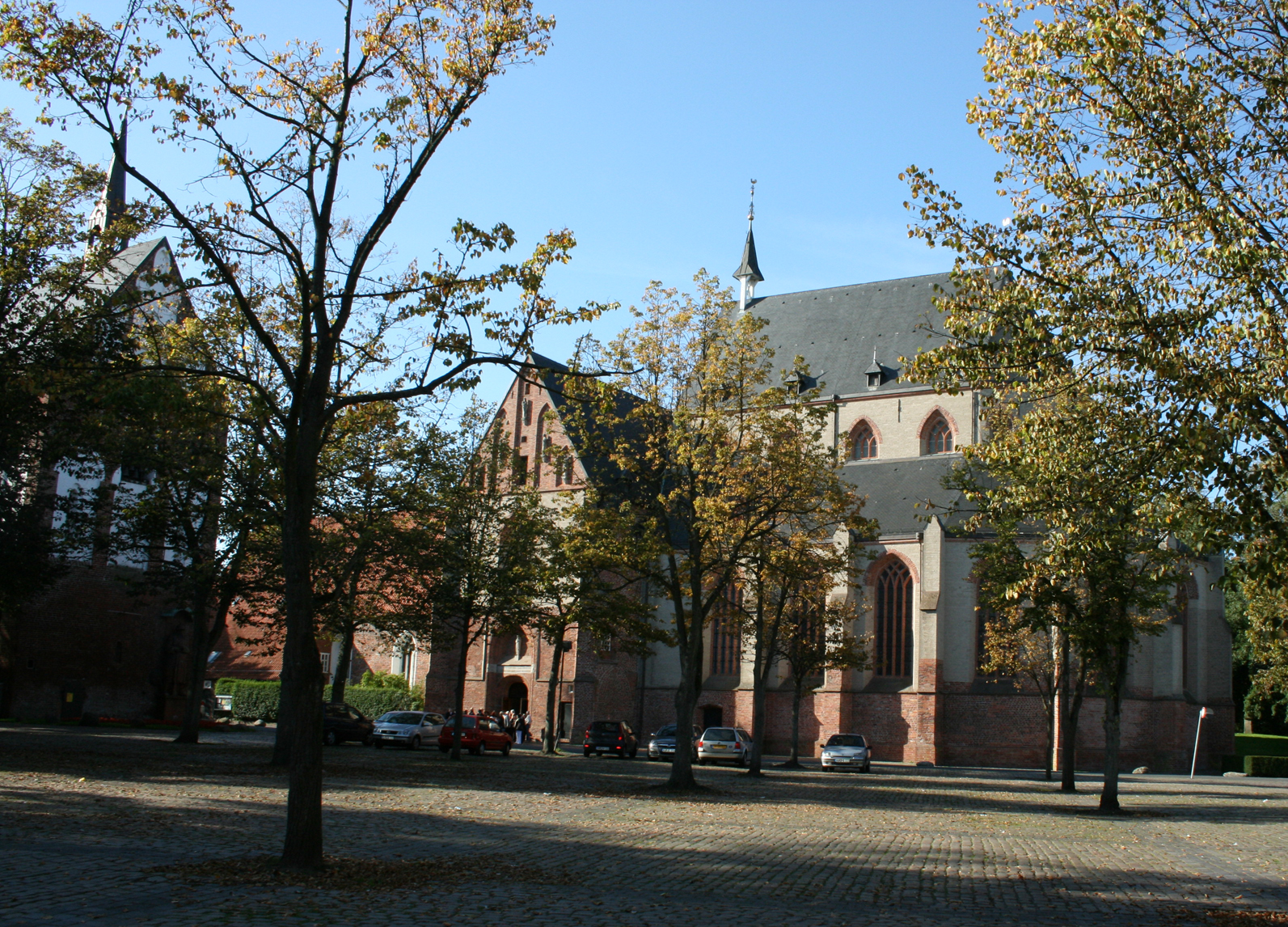
- Ludgeri-Church

- Flag Coat of arms

- Location of Norden within Aurich district
- Interactive map of Norden
- Location within Germany Location within Lower Saxony
- Coordinates: 53°35′48″N 07°12′20″E
- Country: Germany
- State: Lower Saxony
- District: Aurich
- Subdivisions: 10 districts

Government
  - Mayor (2021–26): Florian Eiben (SPD)

Area
  - Total: 106.33 km^{2} (41.05 sq mi)
- Elevation: 7 m (23 ft)

Population (2025-12-31)
  - Total: 24,978
  - Density: 234.91/km^{2} (608.41/sq mi)
- Time zone: UTC+01:00 (CET)
  - Summer (DST): UTC+02:00 (CEST)
- Postal codes: 26506, 26492–26496, 26501, 26519–26520
- Dialling codes: 04931
- Vehicle registration: AUR, NOR
- Website: www.norden.de

Norden (German pronunciation: [ˈnɔʁdn̩]; East Frisian Low Saxon: Nörden) is a town in the district of Aurich, in Lower Saxony, Germany. It is situated near the North Sea shore, in East Frisia.

== Town and land use ==
+ Area in ha by usage As at 30 June 2009
Area	area
Buildings and open spaces	943.54
Business areas	33.38
Fields and sports facilities	71.34
Roads, paths and parking lots	420.76
Agricultural land	8,410.04
Forests	46.64
Waterbodies, ditches, ponds	291.11
Protected areas among others	250.10
Total area	10,466.91

Norden consists of the town itself and ten official subdistricts. In addition to the old town centre, the main town includes the former municipality of Sandbauerschaft and the subdistricts Ekel, Lintel and Westgaste. They are divided into various quarters and residential areas such as Neustadt, Westlintel, Ostlintel, Ekelergaste, In der Wirde, Vierzig Diemat, Martensdorf, or "millionaire quarter". They have in common that they do not have any administrative function, but are places referred to in everyday local language.

The other subdistricts are Bargebur, Leybuchtpolder, Norddeich (which bore the name Lintelermarsch until 1972), Westermarsch I, Westermarsch II, Süderneuland I, Süderneuland II, Tidofeld and Ostermarsch.

The main town and the villages of Bargebur, Norddeich, Süderneneuland I and Süderneuland II, as well as parts of Westermarsch II, have largely grown together, and with the exception of Norddeich and Westermarsch II, form extensive residential and commercial areas in the south and east of the borough. About 92.5% of the total urban population live in this "metropolitan area". The remaining subdistricts continue to be very rural and mostly sparsely populated, but they occupy by far the largest share of the total area of the borough.

== Transport ==
Norden train station

Norden railway station is served by InterCity and Regional-Express trains of Deutsche Bahn.

== Cemeteries ==
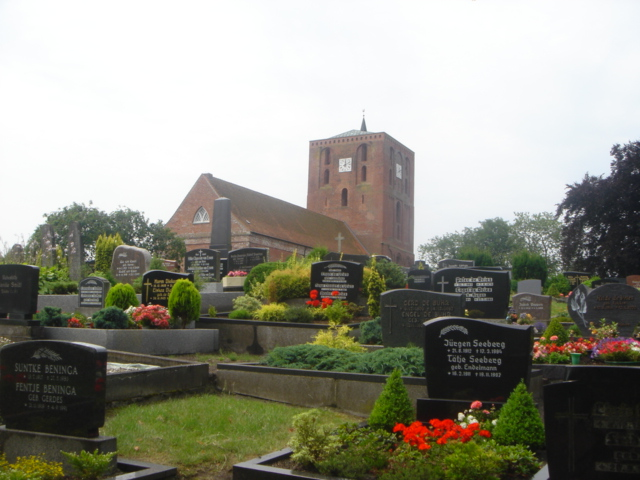
Marienhafe, a neighboring village

== Notable people ==
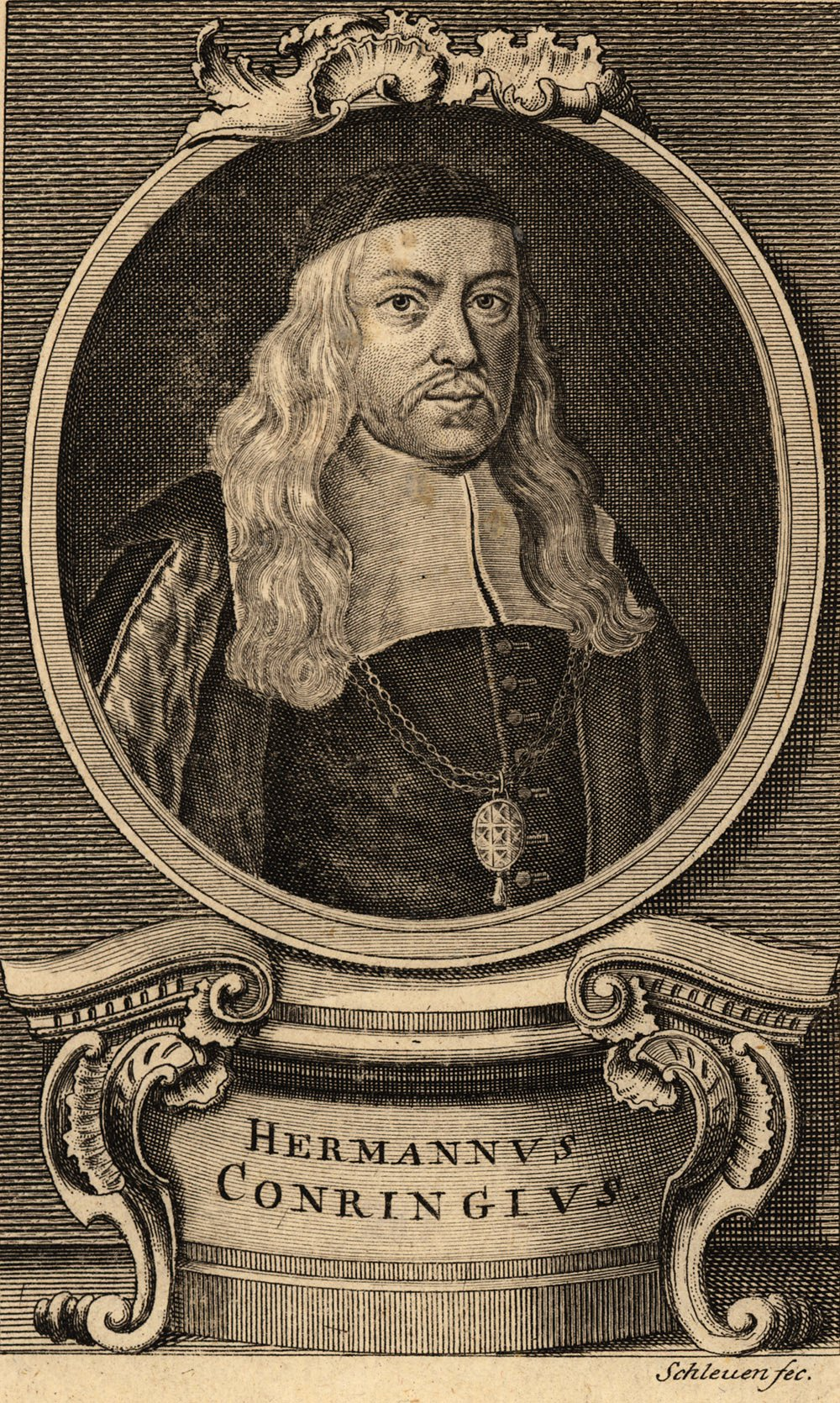
Hermann Conring

- Ulrich I, Count of East Frisia (1408–1466), Count of East Frisia
- Wilhelm Gnapheus (1493–1568), a humanist and Reformed Protestant scholar
- Hermann Conring (1606–1681), German physician and politician
- Pieter Claesen Wyckoff (ca 1620–1694), emigrant to Kings County, (Brooklyn) Long Island, New York.
- Wilhelm von Freeden (1822–1894), German mathematician, scientist and oceanographer and founder of the North German Naval Observatory.
- Gustav Hölscher (1877–1955), an Evangelical-Lutheran theologian and a professor of Old Testament Studies.
- Recha Freier (1892–1984), writer, winner of the Israeli State Prize
- Johann Cramer (1905–1987), German politician (SPD), member of the German Bundestag
- Otto Ites (1918–1982), decorated Rear Admiral of the Federal Navy
- Johann Schröder (1925–2007), German mathematician
- Barbara Schlag (born 1951), teacher, mayor of Norden from 1998 to 2016
- Herbert Müller (born 1953), painter

=== Sport ===
- Heiko Schwartz (1911–1973), water polo player, team silver medallist at the 1932 Summer Olympics
- Marco Kutscher (born 1975), show jumper, bronze medallist at the 2004 Summer Olympics
- Karsten Fischer (born 1984), former footballer, played over 300 games

== See also ==
- Norddeich
- Norden also hosts the launch point of the world's longest submarine cable, SEA-ME-WE 3
- St. Ludgeri church houses the famous organ (1686/92) by organ builder Arp Schnitger
- Norden was the seat of Dornkaat distillers (est. 1806), producer a.o. of the nationwide known brand Doornkaat, a triple distilled korn. The vast production area is protected under monument law, partially serving as a museum, but mostly housing new companies in the old buildings.
