= Süderneuland I =

- District of Norden
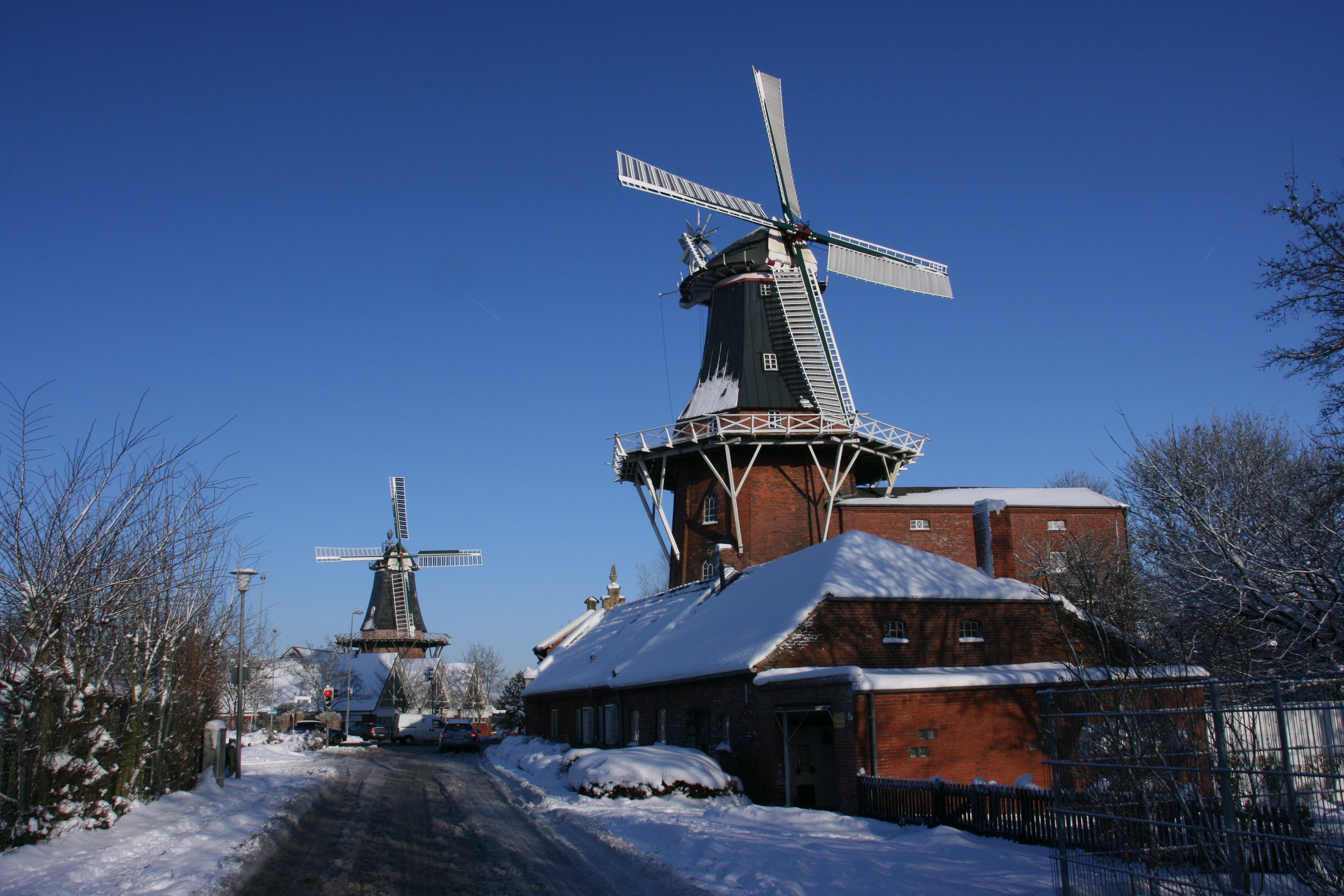
- Windmills in Süderneuland I

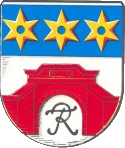
- Coat of arms

- Location of Süderneuland I within Norden
- Interactive map of Süderneuland I
- Location within Germany Location within Lower Saxony
- Coordinates: 53.58358°N 7.21645°E
- Country: Germany
- State: Lower Saxony
- District: Aurich
- City: Norden

Area
  - District of Norden: 6.06 km^{2} (2.34 sq mi)
- Elevation: 2 m (6.6 ft)

Population
  - Metro: 3,021
- Time zone: UTC+01:00 (CET)
  - Summer (DST): UTC+02:00 (CEST)
- Dialling codes: 04931
- Vehicle registration: 26506

Süderneuland I is a district (Stadtteil) of the East Frisian city of Norden, in Lower Saxony. It is located directly to the south of the city, and is the city's most populous and second largest district, after the city center. The area of the current district was incorporated into Norden during the Lower Saxony municipal reform in 1972; until then it was an independent municipality. With the Leegemoor industrial and commercial area, Süderneuland I has by far the largest and most important commercial area in Norden. The Norden train station is also located in the district. Süderneuland II is located to the southeast of Süderneuland I.

== Gallery ==
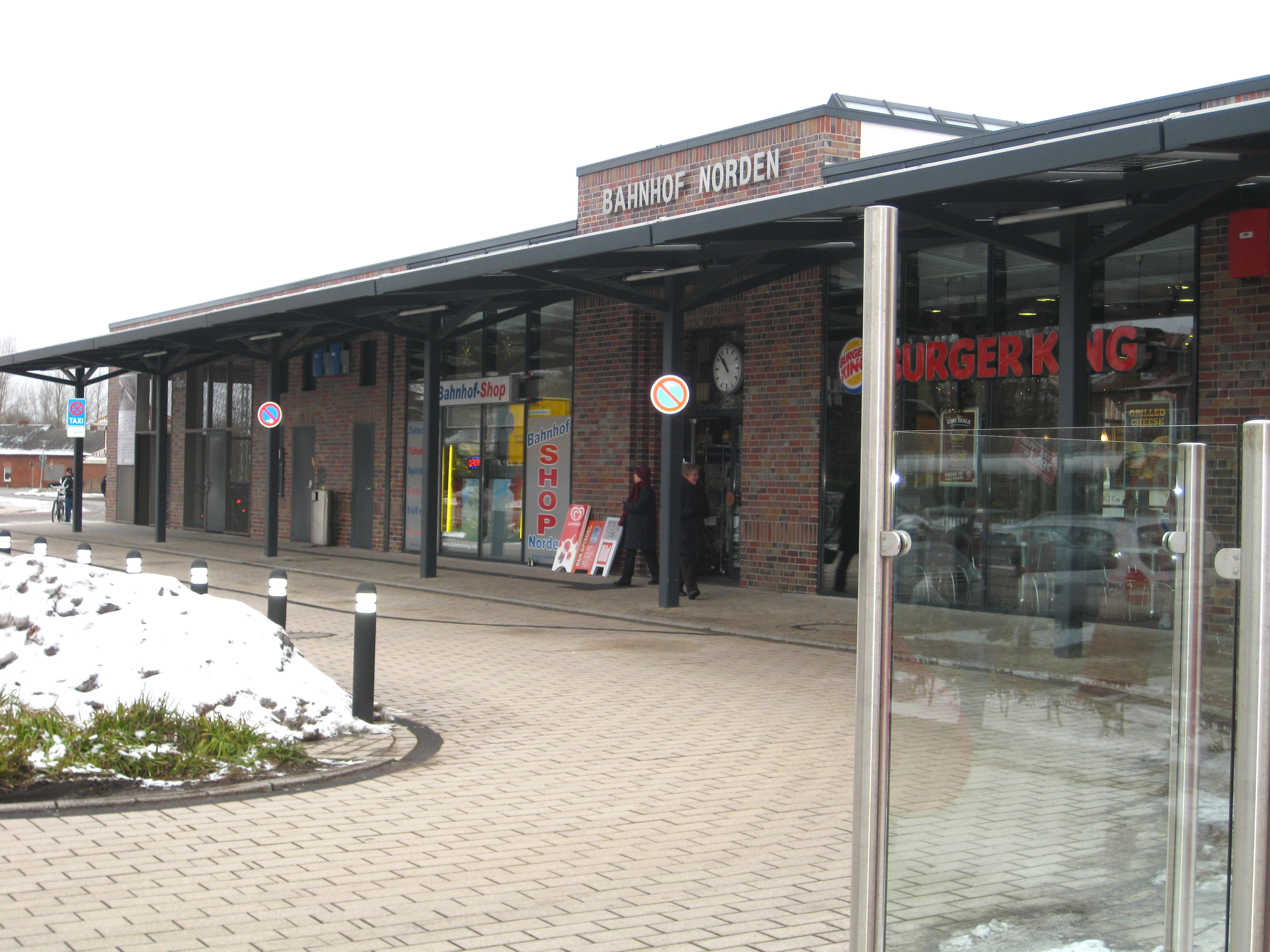
Norden train station

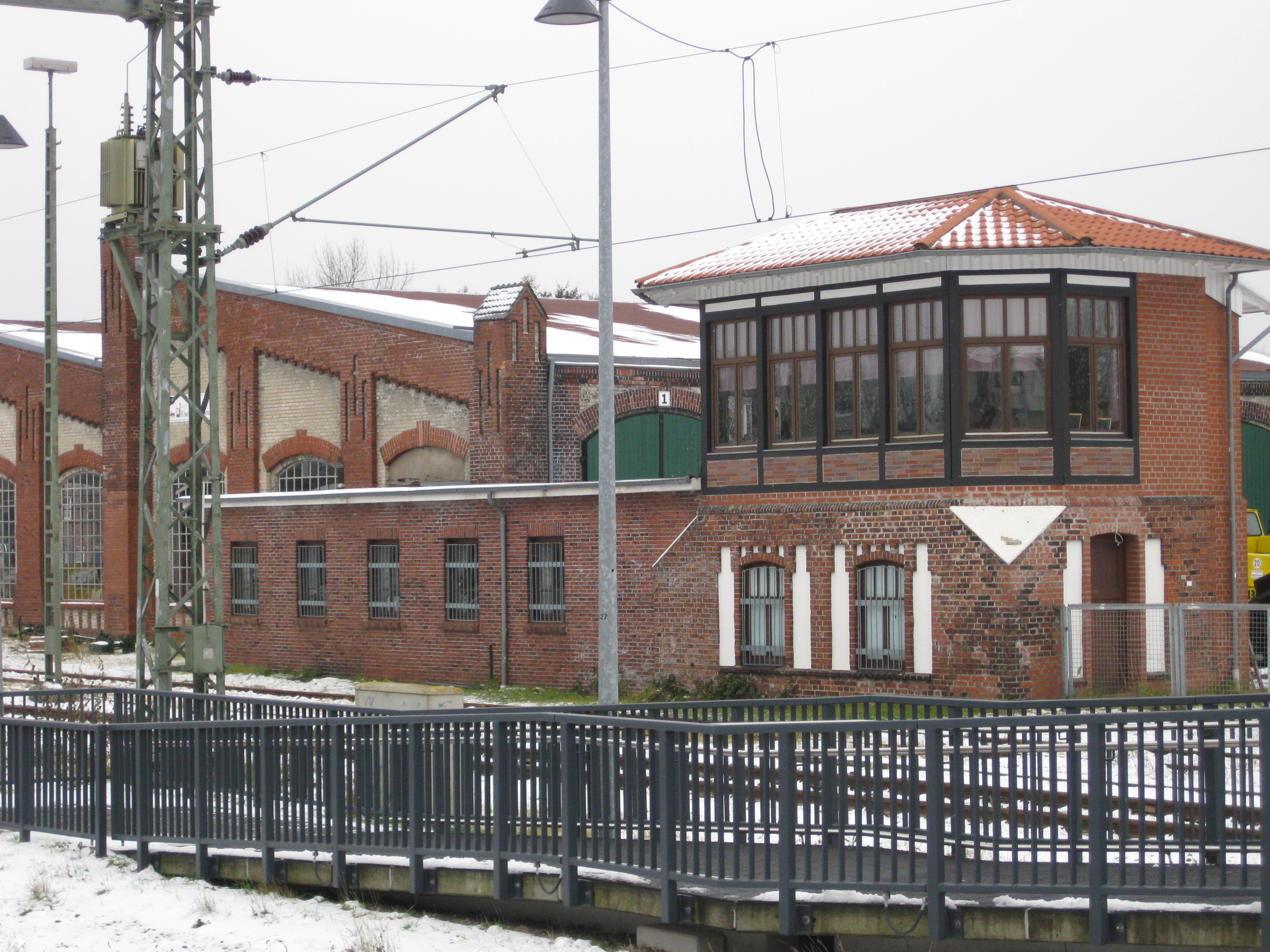
Former signal box

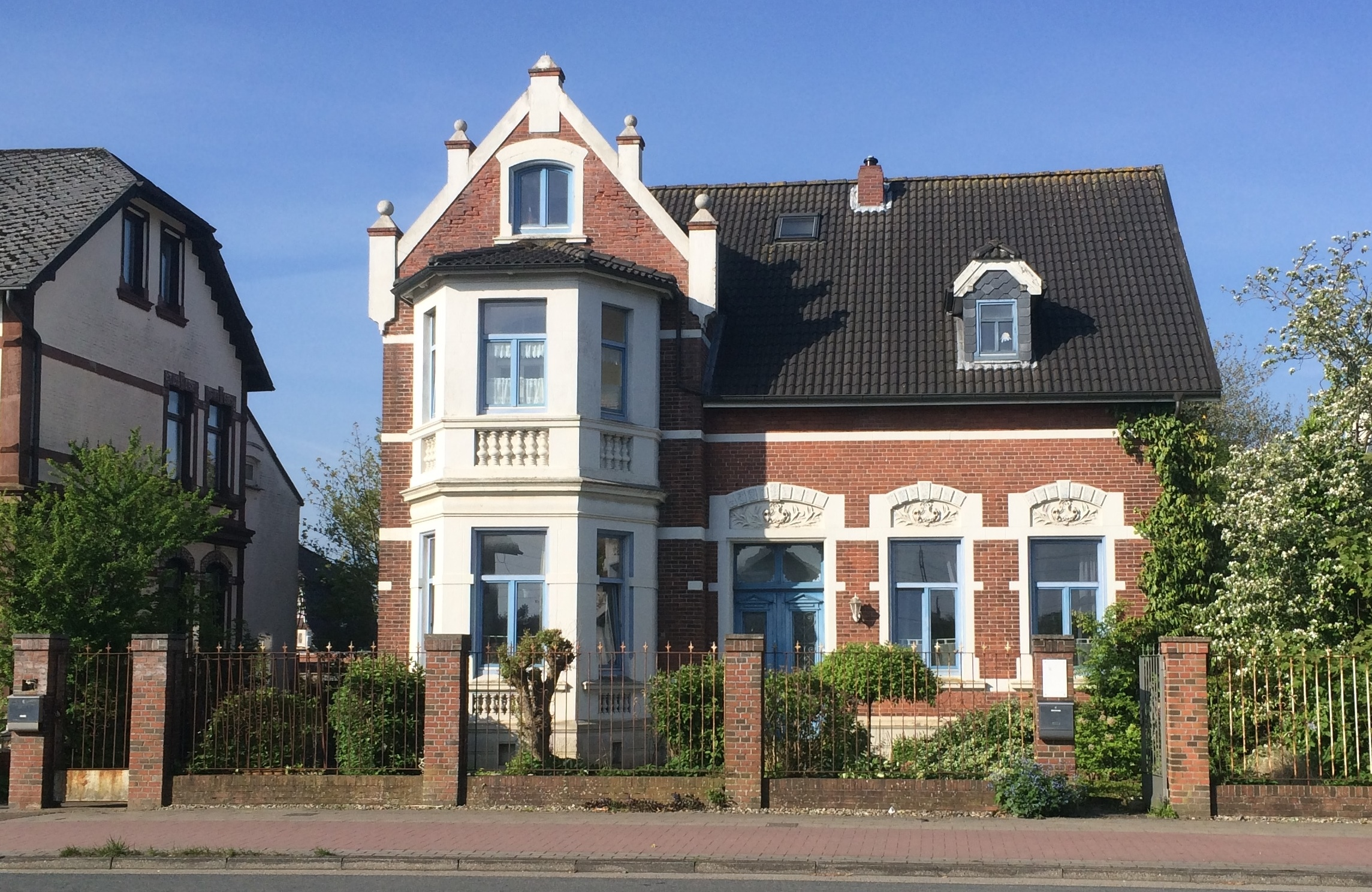
House in Süderneuland I
