= Süderneuland II =

- District of Norden
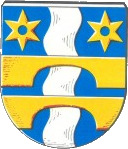
- Coat of arms

- Location of Süderneuland II within Norden
- Interactive map of Süderneuland II
- Location within Germany Location within Lower Saxony
- Coordinates: 53.56914°N 7.24015°E
- Country: Germany
- State: Lower Saxony
- District: Aurich
- City: Norden

Area
  - District of Norden: 4.55 km^{2} (1.76 sq mi)

Population
  - Metro: 919
- Time zone: UTC+01:00 (CET)
  - Summer (DST): UTC+02:00 (CEST)
- Dialling codes: 04931
- Vehicle registration: 26506

Süderneuland II is a district (Stadtteil) of the East Frisian city of Norden, in Lower Saxony. It is located to the southeast of Norden's city center. The area of today's district was incorporated into Norden during the Lower Saxony municipal reform in 1972. Until then, Süderneuland II was an independent municipality. Süderneuland I is located to the northwest of Süderneuland II.
