= Georg Adam Struve =

German legal scholar

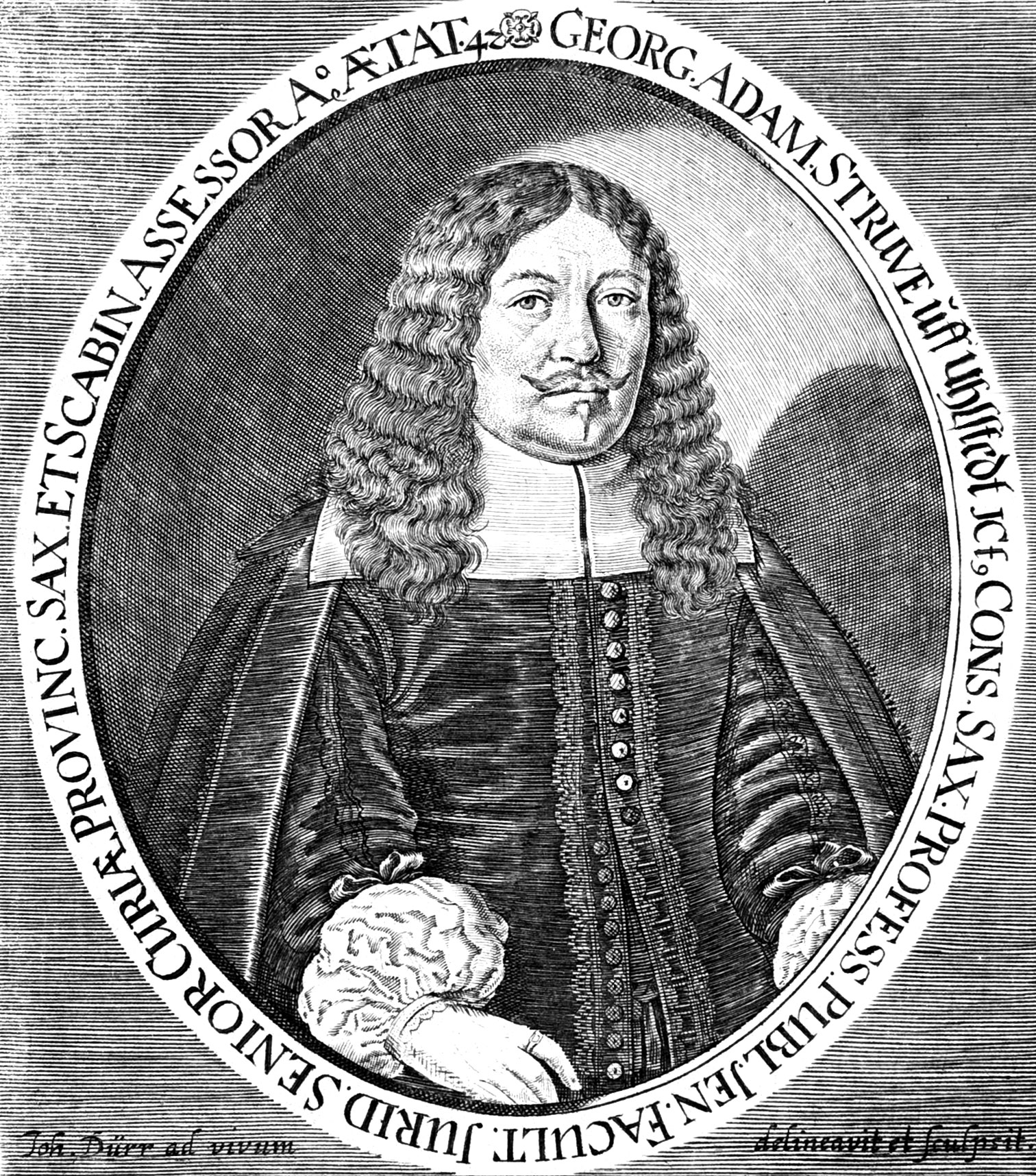
- Born: 27 September 1619; Magdeburg, Germany
- Died: 15 December 1692 (aged 73); Jena, Germany
- Education: Jena; Helmstedt
- Occupations: Jurist; Judge; Law professor Author
- Spouse(s): 1. Anna Maria Richter (1634–62); 2. Susanna Berlich (1647–99)
- Children: 1. at least 7 children by the first marriage 2. at least 17 children, of whom many died young, by the second marriage
- Parent(s): Berthold Struve (1588 - 1650); Anna Margaretha Brunner (1598 - 1669)

Georg Adam Struve (27 September 1619 – 15 December 1692) was a German legal scholar, university professor of Jurisprudence and prolific author of legal texts.

== Life ==
=== Provenance ===
Georg Adam Struve was born in Magdeburg, slightly more than a year after the outbreak of the war which in 1631 would come close to destroying the city. His father, Berthold Struve (1588–1650), was heir to the lands of Wanzleben and Möllenvoigt in the Archbishopric of Magdeburg. His mother, born Anna Margaretha Brunner (1598–1669), came originally from Schleusingen. Both parents came from long established families. His mother's ancestry included a number of prominent lawyers.

=== Early years ===
He received his early schooling at home, later moving on to junior school in Magdeburg. In October 1630, by now aged 11, he switched to the secondary school in nearby Schleusingen: the school was at that time under the direction of the noted education reformer Andreas Reyher. Thanks to wartime disruption, he would not return to his parents' home again till the first part of 1636, by which time – initially – his family did not recognise him. After a brief stay in his father's house in Magdeburg, he moved south to Jena where he enrolled at the university on 11 June 1636. At Jena he was supported by Prof. Fomann, who was a kinsman from his mother's side of the family. Other lecturers and tutors who taught him in the Philosophy faculty, at which he commenced his university studies, included Philipp Horst, Daniel Stahl, Johann Zeisold and Johann Michael Dilherr. By all accounts, he excelled academically, receiving a "cum laude" commendation for his dissertation supervised by Dilherr. He then switched his focus to the Jurisprudence faculty: here he was taught by Dominicus Arumaeus, Peter Theodericus, Erasmus Ungebaur and Ortholph Timann. During this period, war was never far away. As a Protestant from the north he was in constant danger from Catholic forces. News came through that his father's home at Wanzleben had been destroyed by Imperial troops. In December 1640, after more than four years away, he returned home to recuperate. During the first part of 1641 Struve moved on to the University of Helmstedt to pursue his university studies further. At Helmstedt Struve was influenced, in particular, by Hermann Conring, who introduced him to Politics and to the ancient origins of German Law. His other teachers at Helmstedt included the Protestant theologian Konrad Hornejus and the jurist Heinrich Hahn, in whose tutorial sessions he was sometimes permitted to explain and expand on Hahn's presentations and provide supplementary notes, in cases where fellow audience members had been left in need of further elucidation. Having completed his legal studies he concluded his student career with a dissertation entitled "de vindicta privata" (loosely, "on private retribution") and was awarded his "Academic Licence" by a committee chaired by his tutor, Heinrich Hahn.

=== Post-graduation ===
In April 1645, still aged only 25, he accepted a judicial chair (Schöffengerichte) in Halle from Prince August of Saxony (in his capacity as Prince-archbishop of Magdeburg). In February 1646 he received his doctorate in law, again from the University of Helmstedt. Six months later, on the recommendation of the faculty, he was offered and accepted the professorship of jurisprudence at Jena which had become vacant following the recent death of the respected jurist, Gottfried Fibig.

For the next forty-five years Struve pursued a twin track career, comprising both academic work at the university and his judicial duties, albeit in proportions that varied over time. A third parallel strand, involving government service, emerged only later. On 12 December 1646 he presented his dissertation "de privatis aedificiis" (loosely, "On private buildings"), which may have been a precondition for confirmation of his professorship. In his lectures it is reported that he attempted to replace the traditional "mind-numbing dictation of lecture notes" with a more lively presentational style. He also introduced references to contemporary judicial practice in real-life courts. He quickly attracted large numbers of students to his lectures, generating a certain amount of envy on the part of less gifted colleagues. Meanwhile, in June 1648, he was appointed to a higher judicial position, as an Assessor, at the District Court in Jena.

=== Anna Maria Richter ===
Later that year, on 6 November 1648, Georg Adam Struve married Anna Maria Richter (1634–62), the only daughter who survived to adulthood of Christoph Philipp Richter, long-standing dean of the Law Faculty at Jena. The marriage produced at least seven children: six sons and one daughter.

=== "Syntagma Juris Feudalis" ===
Several years later, in 1653, he produced "Syntagmate Juris Feudalis" (Syntagma of feudal law), a sixteen chapter book, and the first of his several major published works. It became a popular handbook of feudal law. A second, expanded, version appeared in 1659. By 1703 it had reached its eighth edition, now enhanced by numerous subsequently introduced "consilia" and "Responsae".

=== Public service ===
On 23 March 1661, with the agreement of the necessary princes and civic luminaries, Struve took a part-time position as municipal councillor for Braunschweig, still at that stage a relatively autonomous city. The appointment lasted for a term of three years and came with an annual remuneration amount of 300 Joachimsthalers. It also carried the obligation to travel to Braunschweig four times each year, subject to it being necessary. The city fathers were at the time in serious dispute with the powerful Duke of Braunschweig-Lüneburg. Sources commend Struve's effectiveness in defending the city's ancient freedoms in this context. Meanwhile, at the university he combined his teaching duties with his fair share of organisational and administrative responsibilities. He serve four separate terms as a respected dean of the law faculty, and also two terms, in 1650 and again in 1656, as university rector.

=== Weimar years ===
In 1667, after more than twenty years of teaching at the university, Struve moved with his large and still growing family to Weimar, where he entered into the service of the Duke of Saxe-Weimar. They arrived on 11 December 1667 and he was sworn into his new office on 13 December. He would be away from his alma mater for seven years. He took the position of Hofrat (literally, "court counsellor") which involved responsibility for court administration.

In April 1672 the early death, from small pox, of the young Duke of Saxe-Altenburg brought the Altenburg branch of the ducal family to an end. The Altenburg lands now had to be divided between the Gotha and Weimar branches of the family. In the negotiations that followed, Struve was entrusted with the task of representing the Weimar branch. In a matter of a few weeks he negotiated a settlement that satisfied both parties, which was signed off on 17 May 1672. On 25 June 1672, apparently as a reward, Struve became a "Geheimrat" (loosely, "privy councillor") to the Duke of Saxe-Weimar.

=== Return to Jena ===
Struve's first wife, born Anna Maria Richter, had died in 1672, and on 31 December 1673, Christoph Philipp Richter, his first father-on-law, also died. That left a vacancy at Jena for a senior Professorship in of Jurisprudence. There were two applicants. (The other was Johann Strauch who also had close connections with the university, but had been installed at the University of Giessen only two years earlier as law professor and university pro-chancellor.) The position went to Struve who moved from Weimar with his family at the end of July 1674 and was solemnly introduced to his new post in August 1674. His professorship at Jena was now in canon law. For historical reasons this professorship came with the presidency of the (secular) district court in the city of Jena, a post he retained till 1680.

=== Guardianship and a return to public service ===
Duke Bernhard of Jena died in May 1678. By the time he died he had been predeceased by three of his five legitimate children and was living with his mistress of long-standing while engaged in a fruitless campaign to try and divorce his wife, from whom he had been increasingly distanced for some years. After he died his three-year-old son, Johann Wilhelm, was placed under the guardianship of his uncle Johann Ernst of Saxe-Weimar, in accordance with the instructions included in the late Duke Bernhard's will. It was determined that the infant needed more of a full-time guardian: at the end of August 1680 Struve was appointed to take over the management of the child's guardianship needs. He attended to Johann Wilhelm's schooling needs himself, and seems to have become something of a surrogate parent. It was observed that the young prince generally addressed his guardian as "Father".

Struve's guardianship duties already necessitated spending a large amount of time at court. Possibly to ensure the avoidance of divided loyalties, he was at the same time appointed President of the Government and Consistory, also taking a position as Director of Taxation. Although sources differ as to his precise job titles, it is clear that his various administrative responsibilities kept him extremely busy, often to be found at his desk till late into the night. He was obliged to suspend his university teaching activities throughout the 1680s.

=== Final years ===
On 4 November 1690 young Johann Wilhelm of Saxe-Jena died of Smallpox. Struve's guardianship role therefore came to an early conclusion. Struve himself, by now aged slightly more than 70, was by now in failing health and no longer had the energy necessary to embark on a new full-time career. He had never formally foregone his professorship at the university to which he now returned. He had formally retired from his court appointments by June 1691. As a result of his advancing years and changed personal circumstances he was formally excused from the teaching obligations that went with his professorship, although a supportive biographer observed that his "desire to help the young students with his learned discourse and argument remained undimmed".

In 1691 or 1692 Struve accepted an appointment as a "Geheimrat" (loosely, "privy councillor") to the Landgraf of Hesse-Kassel.

From 1686 Struve suffered from painful lithiasis (internal stones). On 16 December 1692, a four in the morning, he died from a Pulmonary embolism.

Despite his fecundity, he had grown rich from his various jobs. In addition to the estate at Wanzleben which he had inherited from his father, he was able to leave to his surviving heirs two further estates, one at Uhlstatt and the other by the university, at Wenigen-Jena. During his later years he used to give "Wenigen-Jena" as his name on the title pages of his books. His heirs also benefitted financially from his continuing and posthumous success as an author of law books. "Iurisprudentia Romano-Germanica forensis", first published in 1670, had appeared in successive new editions 30 times by 1771. For more than a century it was a standard work, indispensable for law students and their professors as it was for lawyers and judges.

== Family ==
Georg Adam Struve married Anna Maria Richter in Jena on 6 November 1648. In highlighting the bride's extreme youth, one commentator points out that after thirty years of destructive warfare, people lived with the heightened probability of early death, whether from unruly armies or – more commonly – from the many contagious illnesses that accompanied them. The marriage was followed by the births of the couple's seven children, six of whom were boys. Anna Maria died, aged not quite 28, in Jena on 12 February 1662: her body was buried on 21 February 1662.

Georg Adam Struve married secondly, in Dresden on 31 August 1663, Susanna Berlich (1647–1699), thereby confirming his predilection for young wives. At the time of their marriage the bride's father, Burchard Berlich (1605–1690), was employed in Dresden as a court official and law professor. In view of the bride's relative use, sources suggest that the marriage was arranged without much involvement on the part of the bride. The marriage was nevertheless followed by the recorded births of a further seventeen children, though many of these died young or very young. Two who survived to adulthood and achieved a measure of notability on their own account were the polymath-historian Burkhard Gotthelf Struve (1671–1738) and the law professor Friedrich Gottlieb Struve.
