= Johann Schröder (mathematician) =

German mathematician (1925–2007)

Johann Wiards Albert Schröder (4 April 1925, Norden, Lower Saxony – 3 January 2007) was a German mathematician.

Schröder studied mathematics and physics at Leibniz University Hannover and the University of Göttingen. In 1952 at Leibniz University Hannover he received his Promotion (Ph.D.) under Lothar Collatz for his thesis Fehlerabschätzungen zur Störungsrechnung bei linearen Eigenwertproblemen.

In 1955 Schröder received his Habilitation. From 1955 to 1957 he taught at the Braunschweig University of Technology and from 1957 to 1963 at the University of Hamburg, where from 1961 to 1963 he was an adjunct professor.

In 1963 Schröder was appointed professor at the University of Cologne, where he retired in 1986 as professor emeritus. He was a visiting professor at the University of Wisconsin–Madison for the academic year 1960–1961 and at the University of Washington, Seattle for the academic years 1964–1965 and 1969–1970.

In 1966 at the International Congress of Mathematicians in Moscow he was a Plenary Speaker with his talk Ungleichungen und Fehlerabschätzungen (Inequalities and error estimates).

He died as a result of an accident and was buried in the Bensberg cemetery.

== Selected publications ==
- Operator Inequalities. Academic Press, New York 1980.
- Linear partial differential equations, self-adjoint partial differential operators, spectral theory. American Mathematical Society, November 2004.

== Sources ==
- Walter Habel: Wer ist wer? Lübeck 1993.
- Obituary in the Frankfurter Allgemeine Zeitung, 13 January 2007
