= Hermann Conring =

German intellectual (1606–1681)

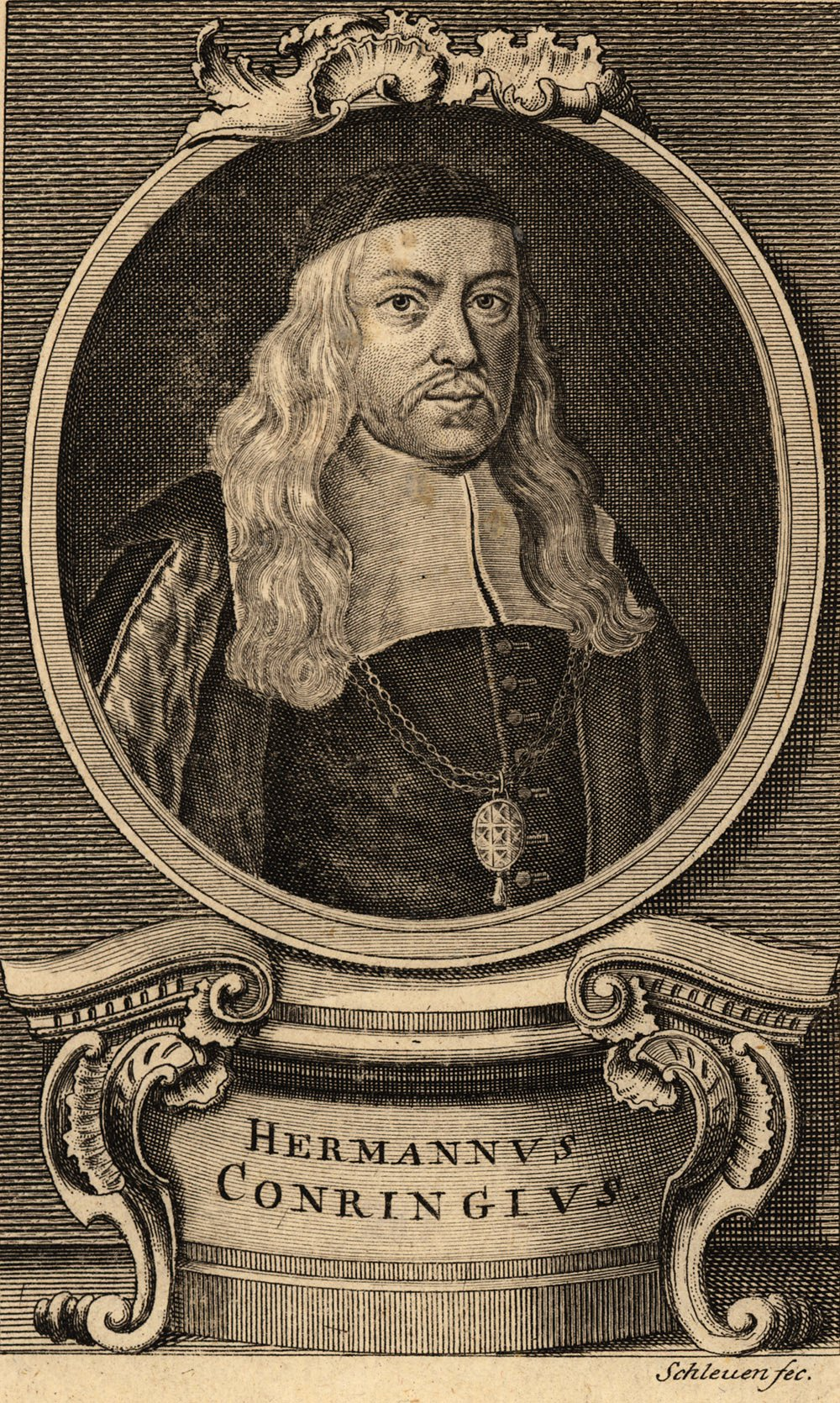
- Born: 9 November 1606; Norden, County of East Frisia
- Died: 12 December 1681 (aged 75); Helmstedt
- Occupations: Jurist, economist, physician

Academic background
- Education: University of Helmstedt
- Influences: Aristotle; Ammirato; Baronius

Academic work
- School or tradition: Aristotelianism
- Main interests: Law; economics; medicine
- Notable works: De origine iuris germanici, 1643; Exercitationes de republica germanica, 1675

Hermann Conring (9 November 1606 – 12 December 1681) was a German intellectual. He made significant contributions to the study of medicine, politics and law.

Descended from Lutheran clergy on both sides of his family, second-youngest of ten children, Conring showed early promise as a student. During his life as a professor in North Germany, Conring addressed himself first to medicine, producing significant studies on blood circulation, and later in his career addressed himself to politics.

== Early life ==
Conring was born in Norden, a coastal town in the County of East Frisia, a territory ruled at that time by the counts of Cirksena. Like many areas of what would later become Germany, Conring's homeland exhibited considerable religious variety and strife. Lutheran in the countryside (and in the piety of its counts), East Frisia nonetheless sheltered a bastion of Calvinism in its chief city, Emden. Conring and his family were no strangers to confessional altercations. Many of Conring's forebears were ministers, and his father and paternal grandfather, in particular, were apparently compelled to change their circumstances on several occasions in response to Protestant religious conflict.

Conring was one of ten siblings, two of whom died in infancy, six more of whom died of the plague in 1611.

== Schooling ==
Conring began his schooling early, as befit a descendant of literate clerical forebears, entering school in Norden at the age of six, and beginning his studies in Latin a year later. About ninety years earlier, Luther had bestowed a powerful legitimacy upon the German language with his translation of the Bible into German, but, as in other European countries, Latin remained the official language of learning for centuries. By the age of 14, Conring had developed into a skilled Latinist, broadly familiar with ancient classical writings and with the leading Latin writers of his own day and region.

In 1620, at the age of 14, Conring began to take courses in the philosophy curriculum at the University of Helmstedt, one of the leading northern European universities of its day, where he would study for the next five years.

== Teaching ==
Lindenfeld calls Conring a Neo-Aristotelian. The term philosophy meant something rather different in his time. It referred to a branch of inquiry that sought chiefly to explicate law, religion and politics in terms laid down by ancient thinkers, particularly Aristotle, who in Conring's circles would often have been known simply as "the philosopher". Lindenfeld says that in 1660 Conring was the first to lecture on Statistik, the forerunner of modern government statistics; but the topic was political science.

In his 1632 opus magnum De origine iuris Germanici (On the origin of German law) he conclusively disproved the Lotharian legend. The legend had purported to explain why Roman law (as expound in the Byzantine Corpus Iuris Civilis) was the law of the Holy Roman Empire.

== Sources ==
- Lindenfeld, David F. (1997). The Practical Imagination: The German Sciences of State in the Nineteenth Century. University of Chicago Press. doi:10.7208/9780226482446 (inactive 12 July 2025).
- Oestmann, Peter (2015). "Lotharian Legend". Encyclopedia of Early Modern History Online. doi:10.1163/2352-0272_emho_SIM_023487.
