= Lütetsburg =

- Municipality
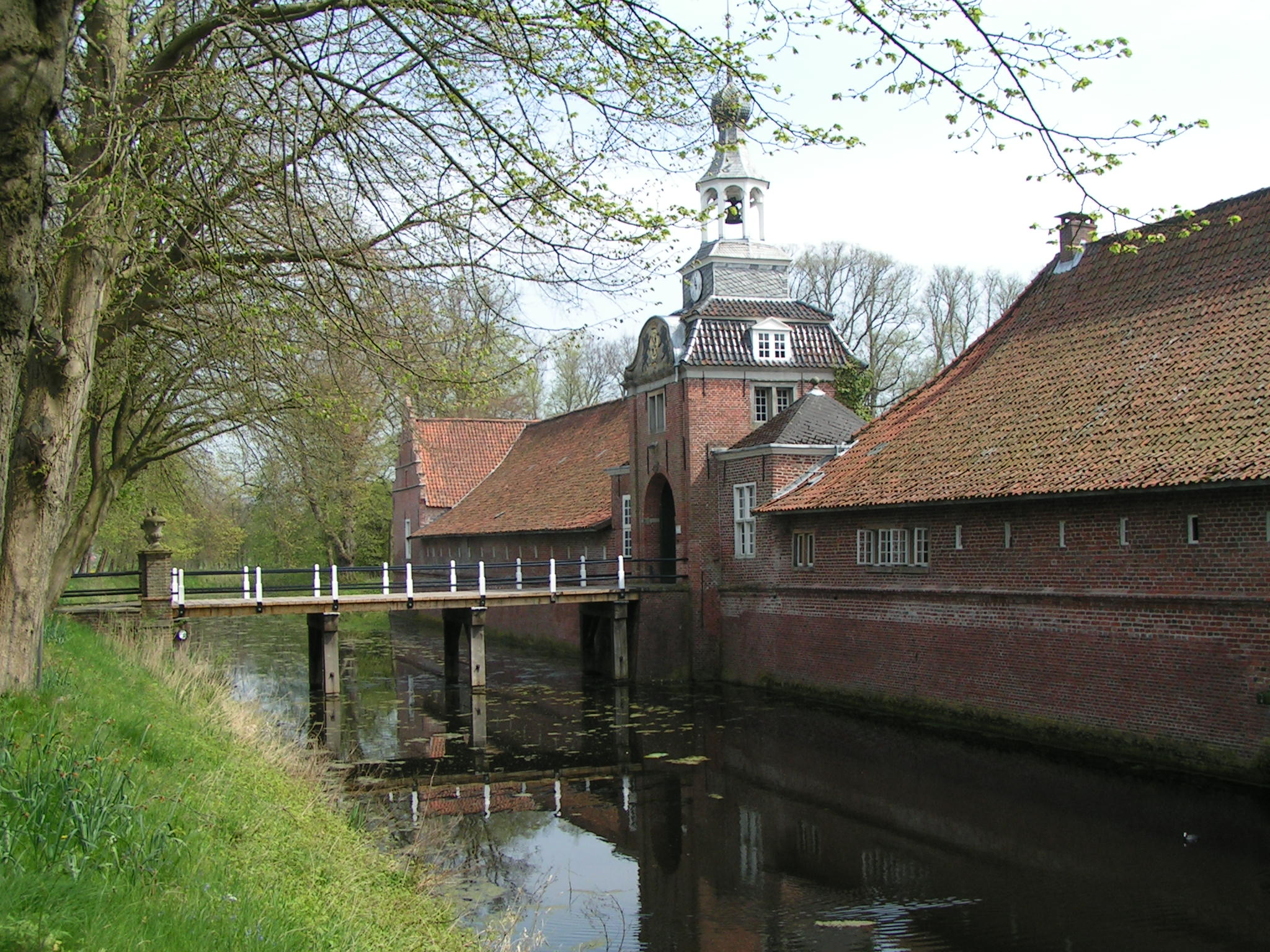
- Lütetsburg Castle

- Flag Coat of arms

- Location of Lütetsburg within Aurich district
- Interactive map of Lütetsburg
- Location within Germany Location within Lower Saxony
- Coordinates: 53°36′N 07°15′E
- Country: Germany
- State: Lower Saxony
- District: Aurich
- Municipal assoc.: Hage

Government
  - Mayor: Gerd Mammen

Area
  - Total: 16.73 km^{2} (6.46 sq mi)
- Elevation: 0 m (0 ft)

Population (2025-12-31)
  - Total: 720
  - Density: 43/km^{2} (110/sq mi)
- Time zone: UTC+01:00 (CET)
  - Summer (DST): UTC+02:00 (CEST)
- Postal codes: 26524
- Dialling codes: 04931
- Vehicle registration: AUR

Lütetsburg (East Frisian Low Saxon: Lütsbörg) is a municipality in the district of Aurich, in Lower Saxony, Germany.
