= Tom Brok family =

Ruling family of East Frisia

House of tom Brok
- Noble family
- Coat of Arms
- Country: Germany
- Founded: 14th century
- Founder: Keno I tom Brok
- Final ruler: Ocko II tom Brok
- Titles: Landeshovetling of Brokmerland; Landeshovetling of Auricherland
- Estates: Oldeborg Castle; Aurich Castle
- Dissolution: 1435

The tom Brok family (Saterland Frisian: [ˈtəm brɔk], also: tom Broke, tom Brook, tom Broek, ten Brok, ten Broke; equivalent to Dutch ten broek, "at the marsh") were a powerful East Frisian line of chieftains, originally from the Norderland on the North Sea coast of Germany. From the second half of the 14th century, the tom Broks tried to gain control of East Frisia over the other chieftain families. The line of tom Brok died out in 1435.

== Rise and fall ==
The earliest historically documented representative of the family is Keno Kenesna, who in 1309 was one of the three consules et advocati terrae Nordensis. Originally, the family's property in Brokmerland was probably not very large. Descendants had already ruled the parishes of Uttum and Visquard around 1347 and the family was one of the most influential in the Emsigerland and the Norderland. In Brokmerland the tom Broks maintained a Redgerhof in Engerhafe, which gave the owner the right to exercise the office of judge. Keno Hilmerisna was elected chief by the Brookmerlanders. He was the first to call himself tom Brok. In 1361, he led the state militia against Edo Wiemken and in 1371 was the first chief of Brokmerland. Furthermore, he was one of the four 'consules' elected annually for the Norderland.

Keno's son Ocko I (around 1345–1391) was knighted at the court of Naples and expanded his territory to include the Norderland. In 1379, the Emsigerland north of Emden was acquired, as well as the Harlingerland and Auricherland. In the following years, the Auricherland with its castle in Aurich becomes the centre of the lordship of tom Brok. In 1381, Ocko I offered his domain as a fief to Duke Albert of Bavaria (as Count of Holland). The East Frisians saw this as a violation of Frisian freedom and Ocko I was murdered in front of his castle at Aurich.

Ocko's widow, Foelke the Cruel, initially took over the reins of power as regent and the guardian of their son, Widzeld. After he had become ruler, he took in the Victual Brothers under Klaus Störtebeker and offered them a place of retreat in East Frisia. Widzeld died in 1399 in the church at Detern from a fire caused by a blaze started by warriors of the Archbishop of Bremen, the Count of Oldenburg and other allies. This prompted the Hanseatic League to intervene against the Vital Brothers around 1400.

Widzeld's successor was Keno II, who defeated the Emden chieftain, Hisko Abdena, in 1413. In 1415, he extended his rule to the western part of Frisia. In 1400, the Hanseatic League forced him to give up his alliance with the pirates.

Keno's son Ocko II inherited such large territories that he was able call himself the chief of East Frisia. He consolidated his rule in West Frisia and Emden in 1421/22 with a victory by the chieftain, Focko Ukena, who was allied with him. In the following period, however, there were disputes between Focko Ukena and Ocko tom Brok, which turned into open acts of war. After the first victory of the East Frisian chief Focko Ukena over Ocko II at Detern in 1426, Focko allied himself with the Bishop of Münster and numerous East Frisian chiefs against Ocko, who was limited to Brokmerland and defeated him on 28 October at the Wild Fields between Oldeborg and Marienhafe for good. He was brought to Leer and was imprisoned for four years. In 1435, he died powerless as the last of his family in Norden.

== Genealogy ==
1. Keno I tom Brok (c. 1310 - 1376), chieftain of Brokmerland and Auricherland, married Ocka of Nesse
  1. Hilmer I tom Brok (c. 1329 - before 1376)
  2. Ocko I tom Brok (c. 1337 - 1389), chieftain of Brokmerland and Auricherland, married Foelke Kampana
    1. Widzeld I tom Brok (1361 - 25 April 1399), illegitimate son of Ocko I
    2. Keno II tom Brok (after 1365 - before 16 August 1417), landeshovetling of East Frisia, married Adda Idzinga
      1. Itze tom Brok (c. 1398 - after 1464), illegitimate son of Keno II
      2. Ocko II tom Brok (c. 1400 - c. 1435), landeshovetling of East Frisia, married Ingeborg of Oldenburg
      3. Tetta tom Brok (c. 1402 - before 1423), married Sibet Lubben
      4. Geseke tom Brok (c. 1403 - after 1434), married Tetto Engena
    3. Hebe tom Brok (c. 1370 - unknown), married Focko Ukena
    4. Tetta tom Brok (c. 1379 - before 1400), married Sibrand Brungersna
    5. Ailt tom Brok (c. 1380 - before 1444)
    6. Ocka tom Brok (c. 1381 - c. 1410), married Lütet Attena
  3. Imel I tom Brok (c. 1339 - 24 June 1372), married Heba Abdena
  4. Elborg tom Brok (c. 1340 - after 1376), married Haro Aildisna
  5. Doda tom Brok (c. 1340 - after 1376), married Edzard Ennosna

== See also ==
- Ocko I tom Brok
- Ocko II tom Brok

== Literature ==
- Coldewey, Dettmar, Heimatkundliche Daten. Wilhelmshaven 1960
- Houtrouw, Ostfriesland. Eine geschichtlich-ortskundige Wanderung gegen Ende der Fürstenzeit. Aurich 1889
- Wiarda, Ostfriesische Geschichte, 11 Bde., Aurich 1791–1819
