= Keno I tom Brok =

Landeshovetling of Brokmerland
- Reign: 1371 - 1376
- Successor: Ocko I
- Born: c. 1310
- Died: 1376; Oldeborg
- Spouse: Ocka of Nesse
- Issue: Hilmer tom Brok; Ocko I tom Brok; Imel tom Brok; Elborg tom Brok; Doda tom Brok
- House: tom Brok
- Father: Hilmer Kenesna

Keno I tom Brok, known before his elevation as Keno Hilmerisna (c. 1310 – 1376), was the first chieftain of the Brokmerland in East Frisia.

== Life ==
Keno I tom Brok came from a distinguished family that ranked among the potentes (leading noble families) of the Norderland. A certain Keno Kenesna, probably his grandfather, was already one of the three consuls there in 1309. In 1347, the consul's grandson, Keno Hilmerisna, became chieftain and lord of Broke, Marienhafe, and Aurich.

In a papal letter of grace issued in 1371, Keno I tom Brok is mentioned for the first time as capitaneus Brocmanie ("Chieftain of the Brokmerland"). At some point between 1347, when he first appears in documentary sources as the nobilis vir ("noble man") Keno Hilmerisna, helping to settle a legal dispute in the Emsigerland and exercising judicial authority over the parishes of Uttum and Visquard, and 1371, he had risen to the central position of territorial chieftain (Landeshovetlinge).

His eldest son, Ocko I, who was knighted as a condottiere by Joanna I of Naples, married the chieftain's daughter of Strackholt and Hinte, who became known as Quade Foelke (Low German for "the Wicked Foelke") because of her alleged cruelty. Upon Keno's death in 1376, Ocko I succeeded to his father's inheritance and expanded the family's dominion over almost all of East Frisia. After Ocko's own death, his widow Foelke governed as regent until their sons, Widzeld and Keno II tom Brok, reached adulthood.

== Marriage and children ==
Around 1335, he married Ocka of Nesse. Together they had the following children:

- Hilmer tom Brok (c. 1329 - before 1376)
- Ocko I tom Brok (before 1337 - 1389), married Foelke Kampana
- Imel tom Brok (c. 1339 - 1372), married Heba Abdena
- Elborg tom Brok (c. 1340 - after 1376), married Haro Aildisna
- Doda tom Brok (c. 1340 - after 1376), married Edzard Ennosna

== See also ==
- Frisians
- House of Attena
- County of East Frisia
- List of counts of East Frisia
