= Brokmerland =

Historical region of East Frisia

- Medieval sealand of Frisia
- 12th century–1464
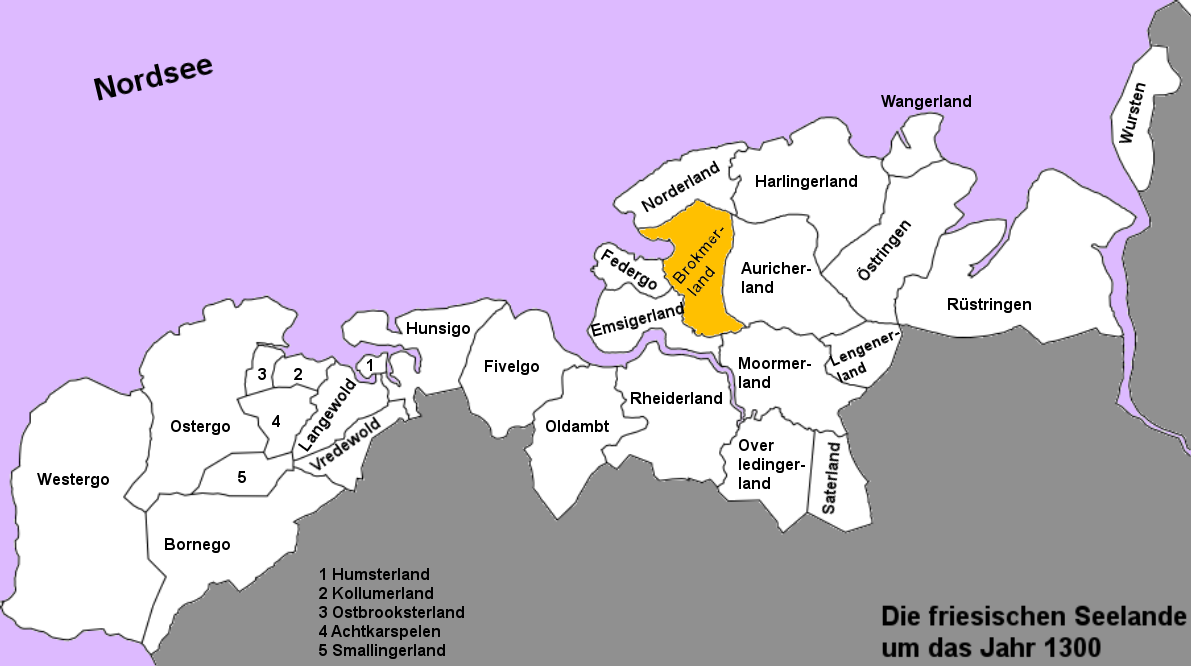
- Brokmerland (yellow), within the Seven Sealands (white) around 1300
- Capital: Marienhafe
- History
  - Established: 12th century
  - Disestablished: 1464
Preceded by	Succeeded by
Federgo	County of East Frisia
- Today part of: Germany

The Brokmerland is a landscape and historic territory located in western East Frisia in Germany, comprising the area in and around the present-day communities of Brookmerland and Südbrookmerland. The Brokmerland borders the Harlingerland to its east and the Norderland to its north. The historic Brokmerland is usually written with only one "o". Occasionally it is also spelt "Broekmerland" ("oe" pronounced as a long "o"), while today's communities spell the name with a double "o".

== Etymology ==
The name comes from the Old Frisian and Old Low German word brōk, which meant a moor-like carr landscape that had been very sparsely settled. It stretched from the western edge of the East Frisian geest ridge, from the Ley (Norder Tief) to the Flumm (Fehntjer Tief), and was characterised by numerous shallow lakes from the Großes Meer to the Sandwater. The suffix mer is derived from mann (English 'man') with the possessive suffix -er.

== History ==
Until the early Middle Ages, the Brokmerland was largely uninhabited and provided a natural boundary between the Federgau and the Emsgau on one side and the provinces of Norderland and Östringen on the other. This boundary also played a role in church history because it was the dividing line between the Diocese of Münster (Federgau and Emsgau) and the Archdiocese of Bremen (Norderland and Östringen).

Archaeological finds suggest a sparse population in the period up to 800 AD. The population grew from about 1100, because the construction of dykes in the region was completed and the Julian Flood of 1164 forced many people to flee inland from the coast. The population increased further during the High Middle Ages, resulting in the sparsely populated or unsettled areas of East Frisia opening up to land development, in a process known as internal colonisation. As a result, the Brokmerland was reclaimed for agriculture by settlers from the Krummhörn marsh as well as the Norder and Auricher geests. In the 11th and 12th centuries, new settlements and the first churches were built on the borders of the geest. The result was the ribbon villages (Reihendörfer), which had a right (called Upstrecken) to claim land into the moor up to someone else's land.

The Brokmers are mentioned for the first time in the Östringen (Rastede) chronicles of 1148, which may indicate that by this time they had attained a certain importance. From 1251 the Brokmänner appeared as inhabitants of an independent territory, the Brokmerland, which was initially divided into three intermediate districts, each with two mother churches: Marienhafe and Engerhafe, Wiegsboldsbur and Burhafe (now isolated farms in the Victorbur marsh), Bedekaspel and Südwolde (Blaukirchen). The parishes belonged to the Diocese of Münster. The main place of assembly of the Brokmann was probably the Wiegboldsbur Church.

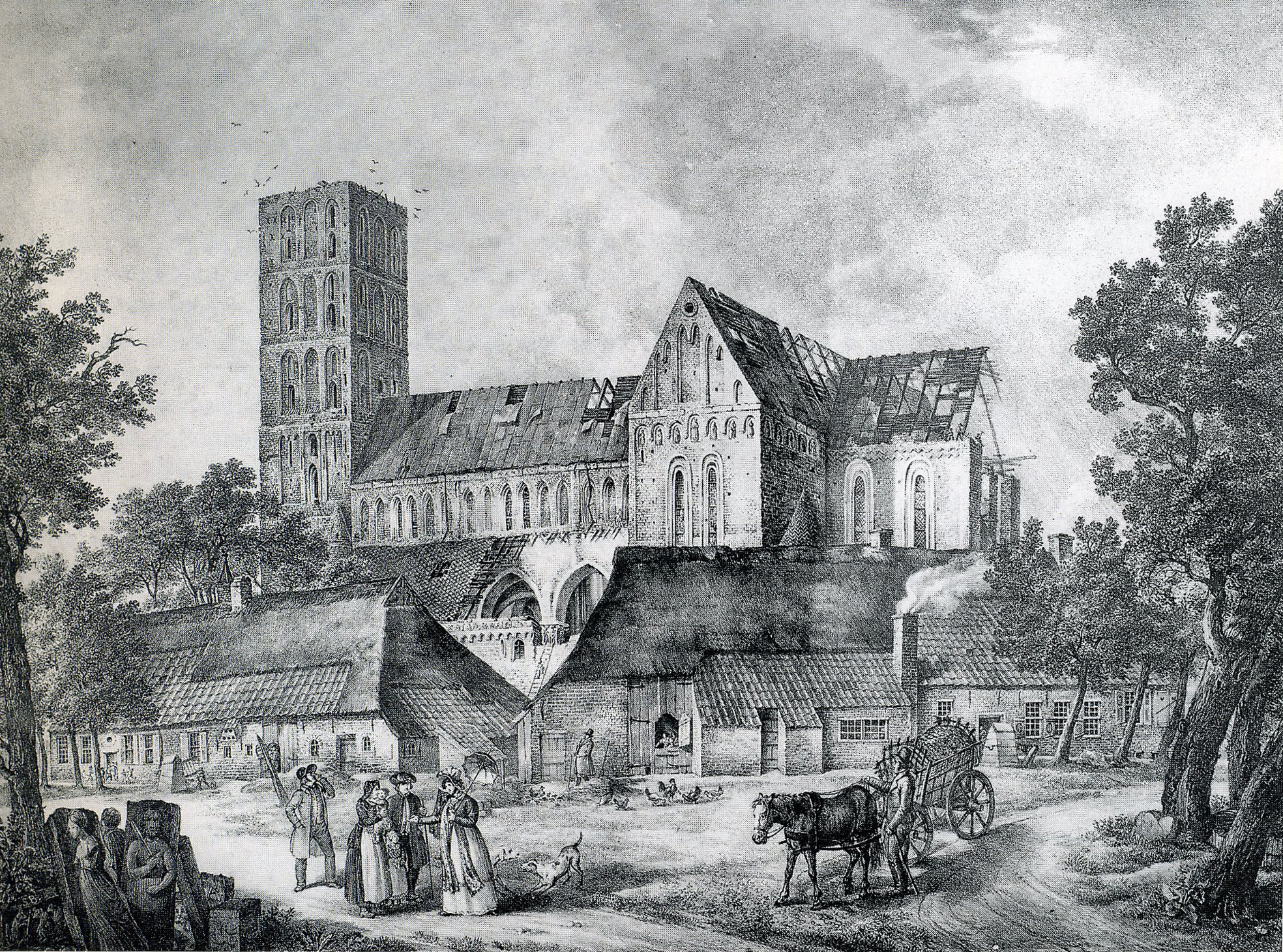
The church of Marienhafe during its dismantlement in 1829

In the 13th century, the Brokmerland experienced its heyday. The construction of great churches was carried out during this time, of which the formerly three-aisled Marienhafe Church is the largest. At the time, it was the largest church in northwest Germany. In 1462 Pope Pius II paid an indulgence for visiting the church, for donations towards furniture, and monetary donations for the preservation of the Church "curia beate Marie". The Bishop of Münster acknowledged the growing importance of the area in the middle of the 13th century by granting the church its own diocese. Previously, it had been assigned to the dean's office of Uttum and Hinte. The bishop also built a castle in Fehnhusen in the parish of Engerhafe, later forming the nucleus of modern Oldeborg.

The Frisian territories had a consulate constitution under which consuls and judges were elected by the people for one year. Political leadership and the judiciary were directly in the hands of the population. Every year, meetings were held by representatives from the Frisian Seven Sealands. The Upstalsboom from that period is still a popular meeting place today. The Brokmerland had its own jurisdiction and a constitution, the Brokmerbrief. This document acts as the most detailed source of Frisian law from the territorial and judicial constitution in Brokmerland, whose law was based on the collective will of the people.

At the end of the 13th century, the Auricherland joined the Brokmerland and formed the fourth region in the territory. After the end of the reign of the tom Brok chieftains in 1450, the Auricherland separated again from Brokmerland.

=== Chieftain rule ===
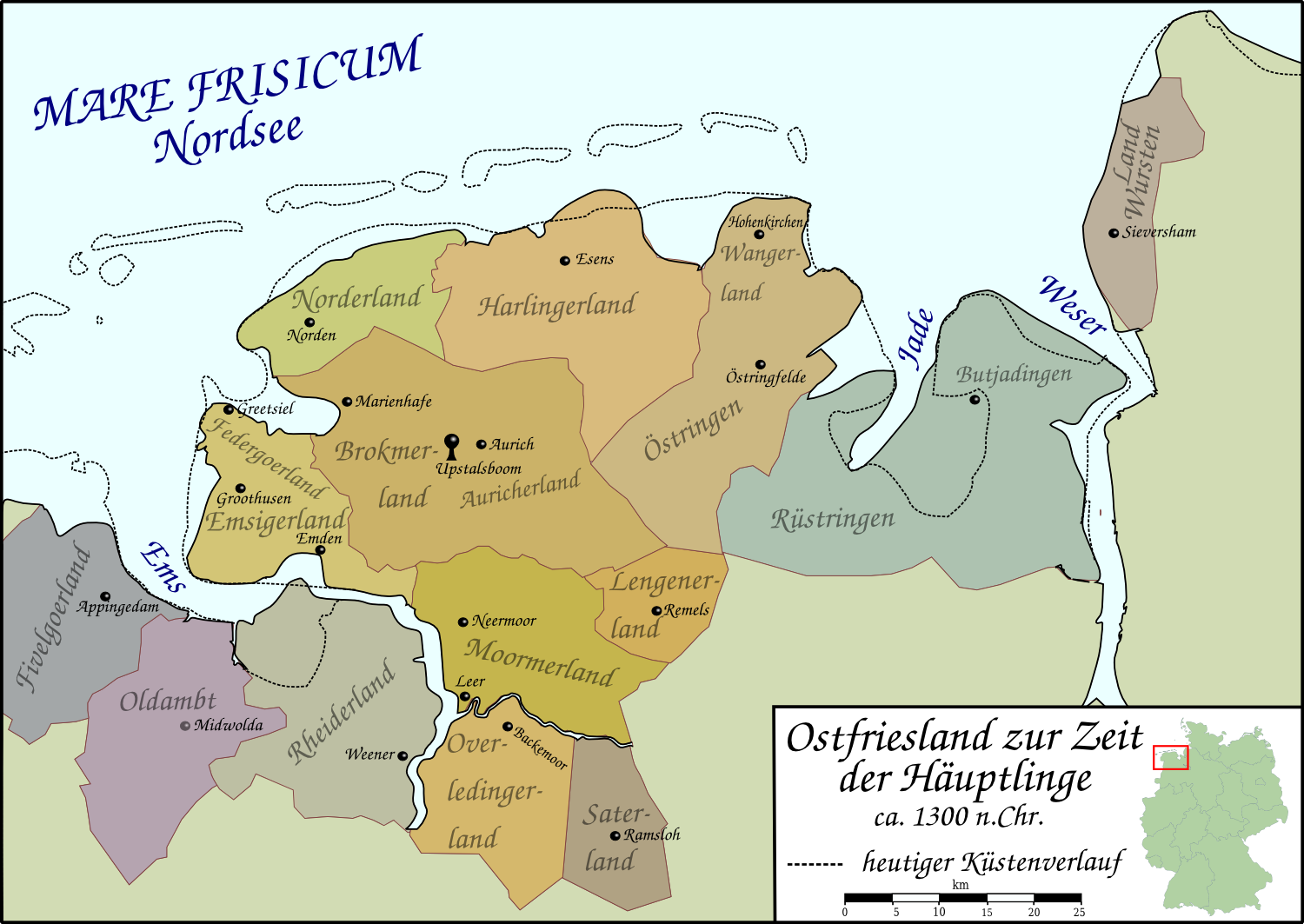
The Brokmerland in East Frisia in the 14th century

The consulate constitution lasted until the middle of the 14th century. It then disintegrated and was gradually replaced, as powerful families took over the chieftainship. In the Brokmerland this was the Kenesma family, who in the second half of the 14th century were awarded the chieftainship of the Brokmerland. Later, they renamed themselves the tom Broks and built the castle Brooke next to the existing episcopal castle in Oldeborg. Later, the tom Broks built a second castle in Aurich.

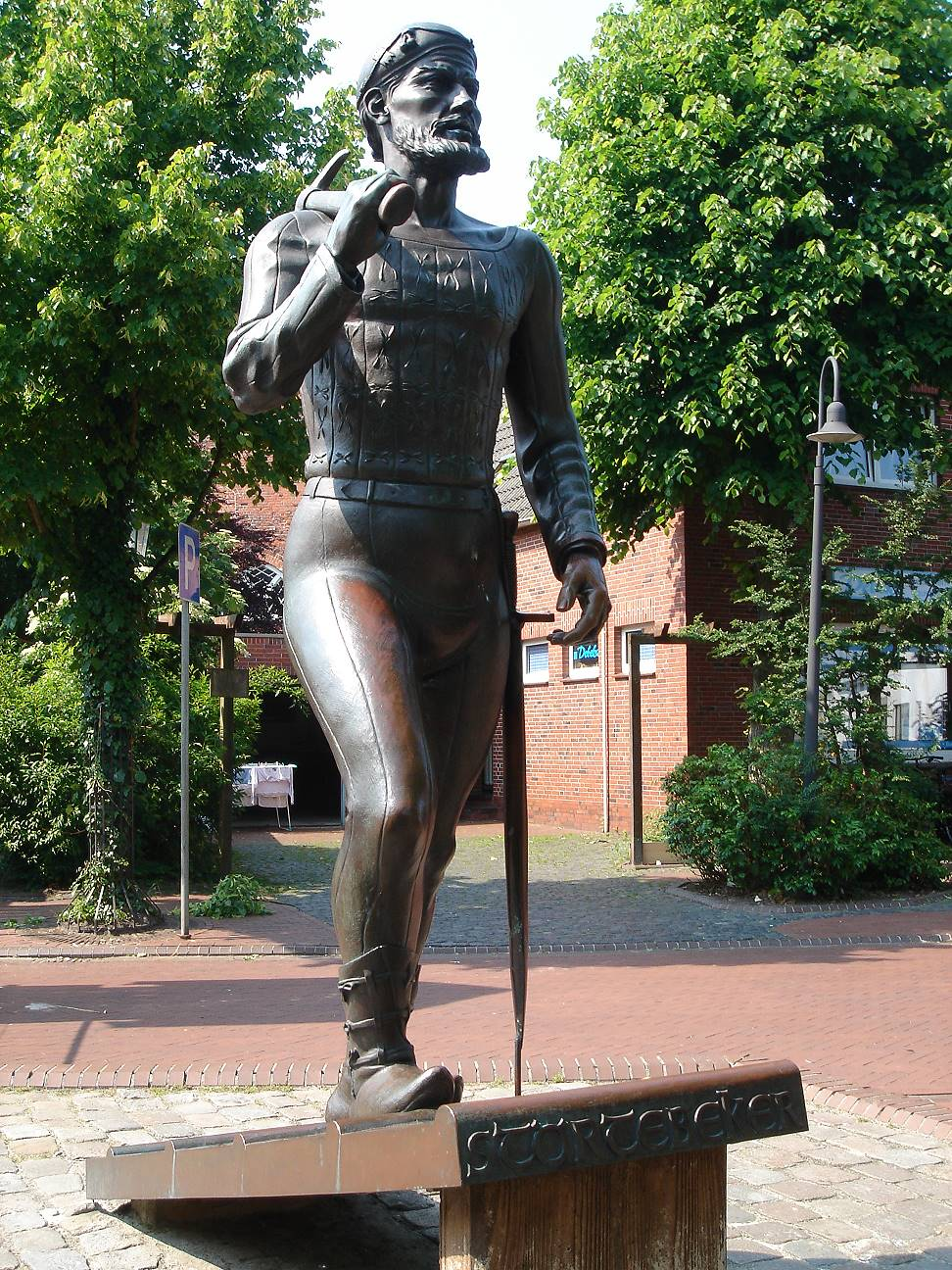
Klaus Störtebeker Monument

The capital, Marienhafe, developed at this time into an important trading centre. After severe floods in 1374 and 1377 it became a seaport, enabling goods from the Brookmerland to be transported by water to the Münster. The mudflats of Leybucht and Kuipersand near Marienhafe take their names from the Marienhafe mother church. Its roof was covered on its north side with copper (kuiper meaining 'copper' in Frisian and Dutch) and on the south side with slate (Ley meaning 'slate' in Old German); from the sea, the changing view of the church with its copper and slate sides acted as a seamark to guide the sailors along the permanently navigable tidal inlet and other stretches of waterway, even at low tide. Without this local knowledge, the tide-dependent harbour was virtually unapproachable from the sea.

In the late 14th century, pirates under Klaus Störtebeker were sheltered in Marienhafe. He returned the favour in the battle for East Frisia by the chieftains of Brookmerland. Widzel tom Brok had opened the relatively new port to the Likedeelers under Störtebeker. They used the place as a safe haven for stashing and selling booty. This was finally stopped by several punitive expeditions by Hamburg against the pirates and those chieftains who sympathised with them. Marienhafe was saved from destruction because of its safe harbour. Faldern and Larrelt near Emden were however destroyed, along with other East Frisian buildings.

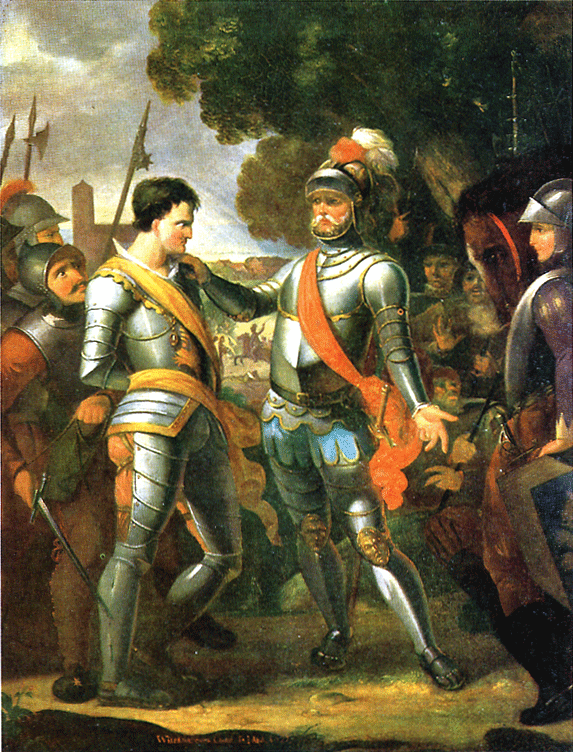
After his capture at the Battle of the Wild Fields, Ocko tom Brok is brought before Focko Ukena. Romanticised history painting by Tjarko Meyer Cramer, 1803

The tom Broks initially had success establishing a territory across Frisia on both sides of the river Ems. Ocko II inherited such a large domain that he could be titled the Chieftain of East Frisia. In the following period, disputes between Focko Ukena and Ocko II spilled over into open conflict. After Ukena's initial victory over Ocko II at Detern in 1426, Ukena allied with the Bishop of Münster and numerous East Frisian chieftains against Ocko – who was now confined to the Brokmerland – and defeated him on 28 October at the Wild Fields. He was taken to Leer and imprisoned there for four years. In 1435 he died powerless as the last of his line in Norden.

The following reign of Focko Ukena in the Brokmerland was a short interlude. Having just escaped from the yoke of tom Brok, many felt betrayed by the new rulers, because like the tom Broks, they appeared not to honour Frisian freedom. A revolt broke out around 1430 in the Brokmerland, which spread into a general uprising by the East Frisian people after an unsuccessful attack by Ukena on Bremen.

On 14 November 1430, after the conquest of Oldersum and Aurich, the East Frisian territorial alliances (Landesverbände) and lesser chieftains, led by Chieftain Edzard Cirksena from Greetsiel, formed the Freedom League of the Seven East Frisian States. In 1440, the Cirksena, then judges and "guardians", became the chieftains of the Brookmerland and Auricherland, succeeding the tom Broks after Ukena's brief reign. However, they had to take into consideration municipal freedom and provincial law. The country's municipalities reconstituted themselves. For example, there was once again a Brokmerland, an Auricherland, and even the separate territories of Bangsted, Ochtelbur, Riepe, and Simonswolde.

In 1464, when the Cirksena were elevated to imperial counts, they turned the areas controlled by their castles into districts (Ämter). From then on the Brokmerland, along with the Auricherland, belonged to the Amt of Aurich and were divided into the Vogtei of Nordbrookmer (with Osteel, Marienhafe and Siegelsum) and the Vogtei of Südbrookmer (with the parishes of Engerhafe, Victorbur, Wiegboldsbur, Bedekaspel, and Forlitz-Blaukirchen).
