= Foelke Kampana =

Frisan noble

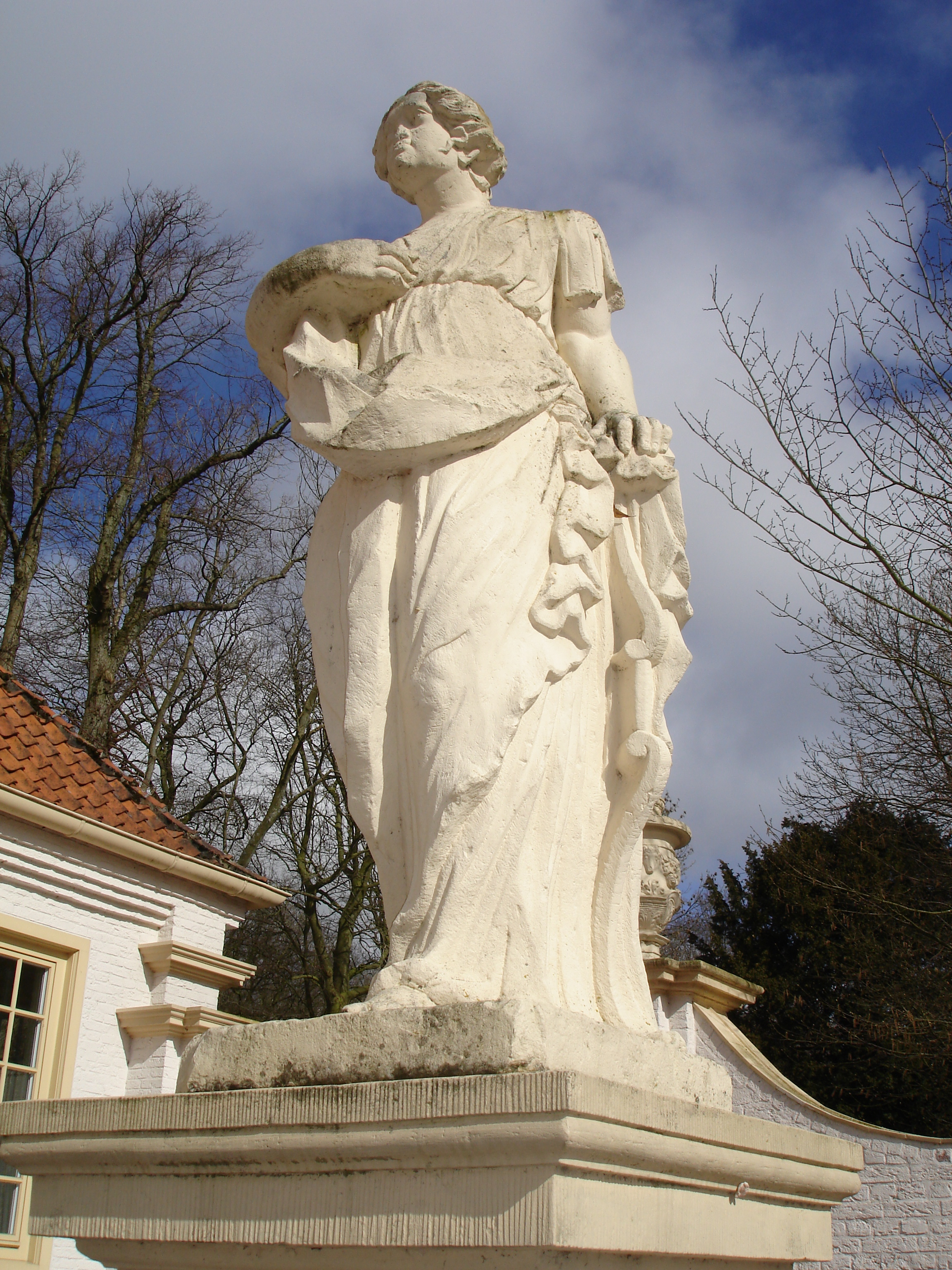
Foelke Kampana monument in Dornum.

Foelke Kampana (1355 – c. 1418), also known as Foelke the Cruel, Fokelt tom Broke, Quade Folk, Fokeldis Kampana Fokelt tom Broke, or Quade Folk, was a Frisian noble. She served as regent for the Frisian territories Oldeborg, Brokmerland, Auricherland and Emsigerland in East Frisia in 1400 during the absence of her son Keno II and in 1417 during the minority of her grandson Ocko II.

Born in Hinte, Foelke was the daughter of Frisian Kempo von Hinte, chief of Westerburg van Hinte, and married in 1377 to Frisian knight Ocko I tom Brok (d. 1389), lord of Oldeborg, and chief of Brockmerland, Auricherland and Emsigerland in East Frisia. In 1389, her spouse fell in battle fighting on the side of the count of Holland. Foelke had tried to assist them, and raised her own army to aid him, but when she arrived, he was already dead. During her absence, Aurich was captured by an enemy, who barricaded himself in the church. Foelke retook Aurich with her army and executed two hundred prisoners. Because her son Keno was still a minor, Widzel tom Brok, an older illegitimate son of her late spouse, succeeded his father as chieftain. During his ten-year rule, he aligned himself with Folkmar Allena, a traditional enemy of his father. Widmer died in a feud in April 1399. Her son, Keno II, was by then of legal majority. Foelke acted as his political adviser, until Keno's death in 1417. She then briefly became regent until her grandson Ocko came of age that same year. Foelke died soon after in Aurich and was buried there.

The court historian Eggerik Beninga (1490–1562), who was related to the Allena family, who competed for power with the Tom Brok family, introduced a number of legends about her in his Chronica der Fresen which led to her becoming an icon of cruelty. Some of the stories appear to be based on real atrocities committed by Keno II, which were transferred to his strong-willed mother.
