= Ocko II tom Brok =

Brokmerland chieftain

- Landeshovetling of East Frisia
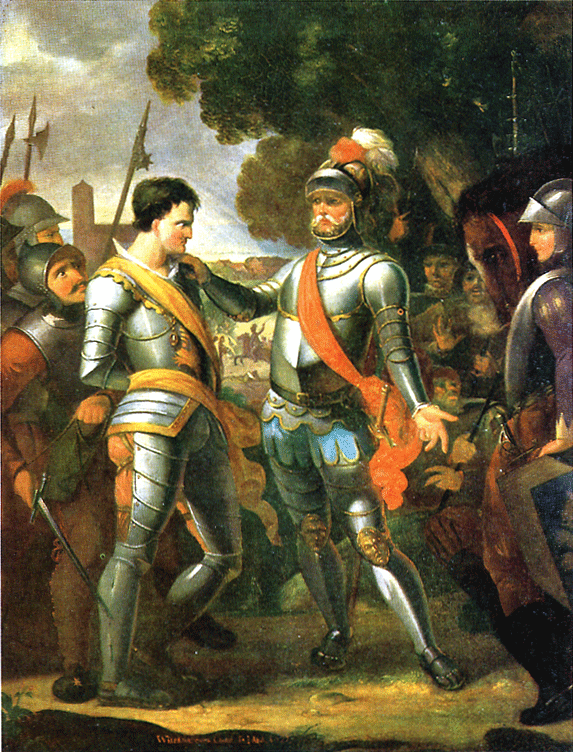
- Following his capture in the Battle of the Wild Fields Ocko tom Brok is brought before Focko Ukena. Romanticised history painting by Tjarko Meyer Cramer, 1803

Landeshovetling of East Frisia
- Reign: 16 August 1417 - 28 October 1427
- Predecessor: Keno II tom Brok
- Successor: Focko Ukena
- Born: 1407
- Died: 1435 (aged 27–28); Norden
- House: Tom Brok
- Father: Keno II tom Brok
- Mother: Adda Idzinga

Ocko II tom Brok (1407–1435) was Chieftain of the Brokmerland and the Auricherland in East Frisia (initially under the guardianship of his grandmother, Foelke).

Ocko was born in 1407 to Keno II tom Brok, son of Ocko I tom Brok. He was the last East Frisian chieftain from the tom Brok line. Under his reign there was a revolt by the other Frisian chieftains against tom Brok. A conflict with his ally Focko Ukena in 1424 led to open conflict in 1426. Ocko married Ingeborg of Oldenburg, and therefore, supported by the counts, asked them for assistance. They sent an army of knights, which was defeated by Focko Ukena and his peasant army on 27 September 1426 in the Battle of Detern. On 28 October 1427, Ocko II was defeated at the Battle of the Wild Fields and fell into captivity. He was taken to Leer and imprisoned for four years. In 1435 he died, powerless, as the last of his line in Norden.

Preceded by Keno II tom Brok	Chieftain of the Brokmerland; 1417–1427	Succeeded by Focko Ukena
