= Ocko I tom Brok =

Landeshovetling of Brokmerland
- Reign: 1376 - 1389
- Predecessor: Keno I
- Successor: Widzeld I
- Born: 1345
- Died: 1389 (aged 43–44); Aurich
- Spouse: Foelke Kampana
- Issue: Widzeld tom Brok; Keno II tom Brok; Hebe tom Brok; Tetta tom Brok; Ailt tom Brok; Ocka tom Brok
- House: tom Brok
- Father: Keno I tom Brok
- Mother: Ocka of Nesse

Ocko I tom Brok (de Broke) (about 1345–1389) followed his father Keno I tom Brok as chieftain of the Brokmerland and the Auricherland in East Frisia, a former territory on Germany's North Sea coast.

== Life ==
According to tradition, he lived in the 1370s in Italy and was knighted by Queen Joanna I of Naples for his military and court services. After the death of his father in 1376 Ocko returned to his homeland in 1378. After heavy fighting against Folkmar Allena, he initially united almost all of East Frisia under his rule. In 1389 he was murdered near the district of Aurich Castle.

== Marriage and children ==
Ocko I had one illegitimate son with an unknown mistress:

- Widzeld tom Brok (1361 - 25 April 1399)

Ocko I tom Brok married Foelke Kampana of Hinte (known locally as Quade Foelke) in 1377. They had the following issue:

- Keno II tom Brok (married Adda Idzinga of Norden) (after 1365 - 16 August 1417), married with Adda Idzinga
- Hebe tom Brok (c. 1370 - unknown), married Focko Ukena
- Tetta tom Brok (c. 1379 - 1426), married Sibrand Brungersna of Loquard
- Ailt tom Brok (c. 1380 - before 1444)
- Ocka tom Brok (c. 1381 - between 1397 - 1410), married Lütet Attena of Dornum and Nesse

Preceded by Keno I tom Brok	Chieftain of the Brokmerland; 1376–1389	Succeeded by Widzeld tom Brok
