= Kleines Meer =

Lake in Germany

- Hieve
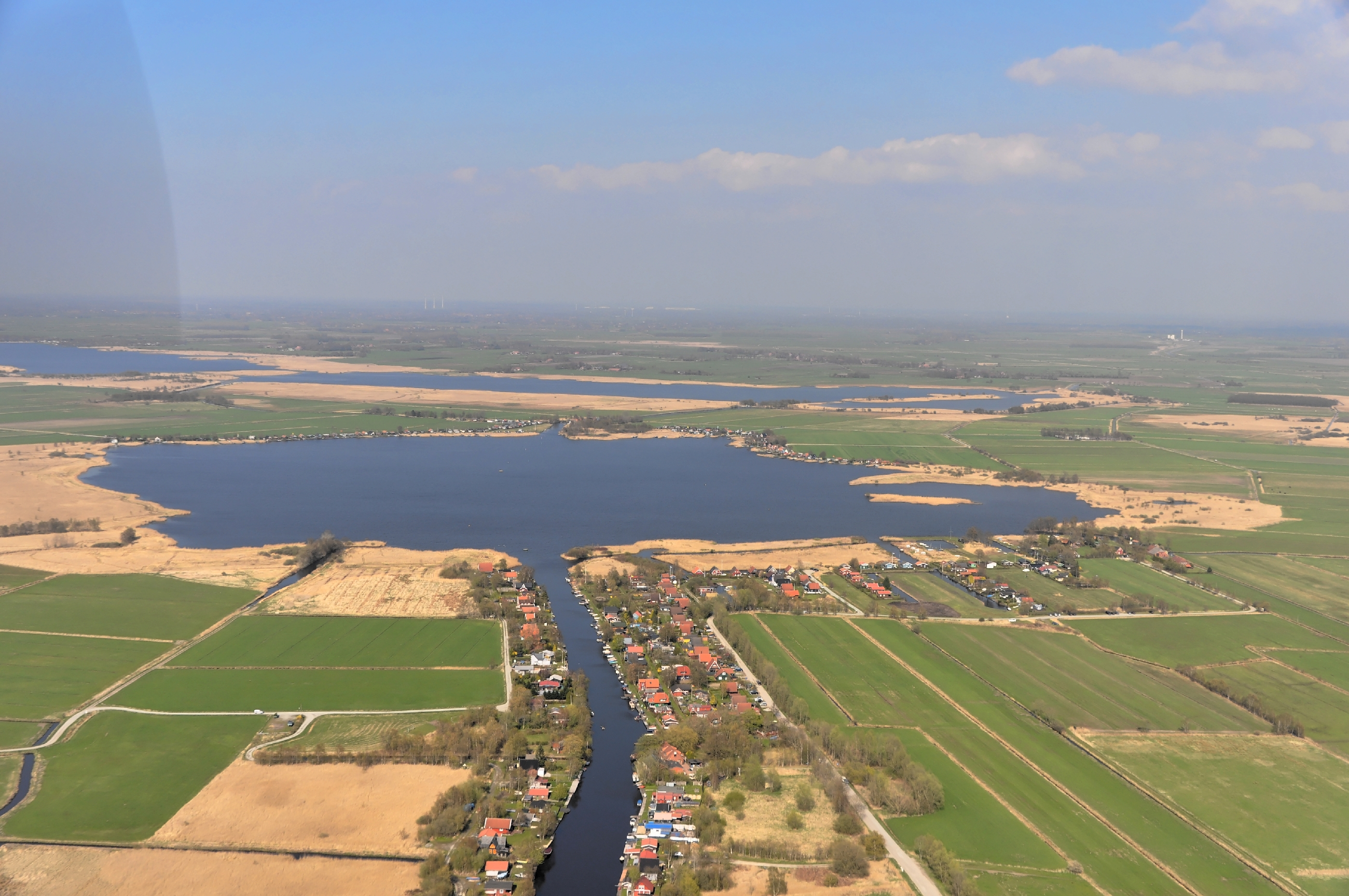
- The Kleines Meer (centre) and the Großes Meer (left rear) from the air

- Location within Germany
- Location: Hinte, East Frisia
- Coordinates: 53°24′44″N 7°16′35″E
- Primary inflows: Heikeschloot from the Großes Meer, Alte Maar from the Ems-Jade Canal
- Primary outflows: Kurzes Tief → Treckfahrtstief → Falderndelft → Dollart
- Surface area: 93 ha (230 acres)
- Max. depth: 19 m (62 ft)

The Kleines Meer ("Little Lake"), also called the Hieve, is a lake in East Frisia. It lies northeast of Emden on the territory of the municipality of Hinte; its southwestern shore borders on the Uphusen-Marienwehr borough of Emden, its southeastern and eastern shores on the municipality of Südbrookmerland.

The Kleines Meer has an area of 93 hectares (230 acres) and is thus significantly smaller than the neighbouring Großes Meer ("Great Lake"), which lies within the municipality of Südbrookmerland. After sand was removed in the late 1970s, the formerly shallow lake had a maximum depth of 24 metres (79 ft). In July 2006 it was still up to 19 metres (62 ft) deep, albeit in the middle of the dredged basin.

The Kleines Meer is popular as a leisure and recreation spot, especially with dinghy sailors, surfers, anglers and weekenders. Little holiday chalets, the so-called Meerbuden, have been built along the Emden, Hinte and Südbrookmerland shores. Unlike the Großes Meer, motor boats are allowed on the shortest route on the Hieve, but may not exceed 5 km/h (3.1 mph) in order to protect the natural habitat and the banks of the lake shore.

There is a link to the rest of the East Frisian waterways network along its only outlet, the Kurze Tief; this flows into the Treckfahrtstief, which, in turn, links to the canal network of the town of Emden and eventually to the River Ems.

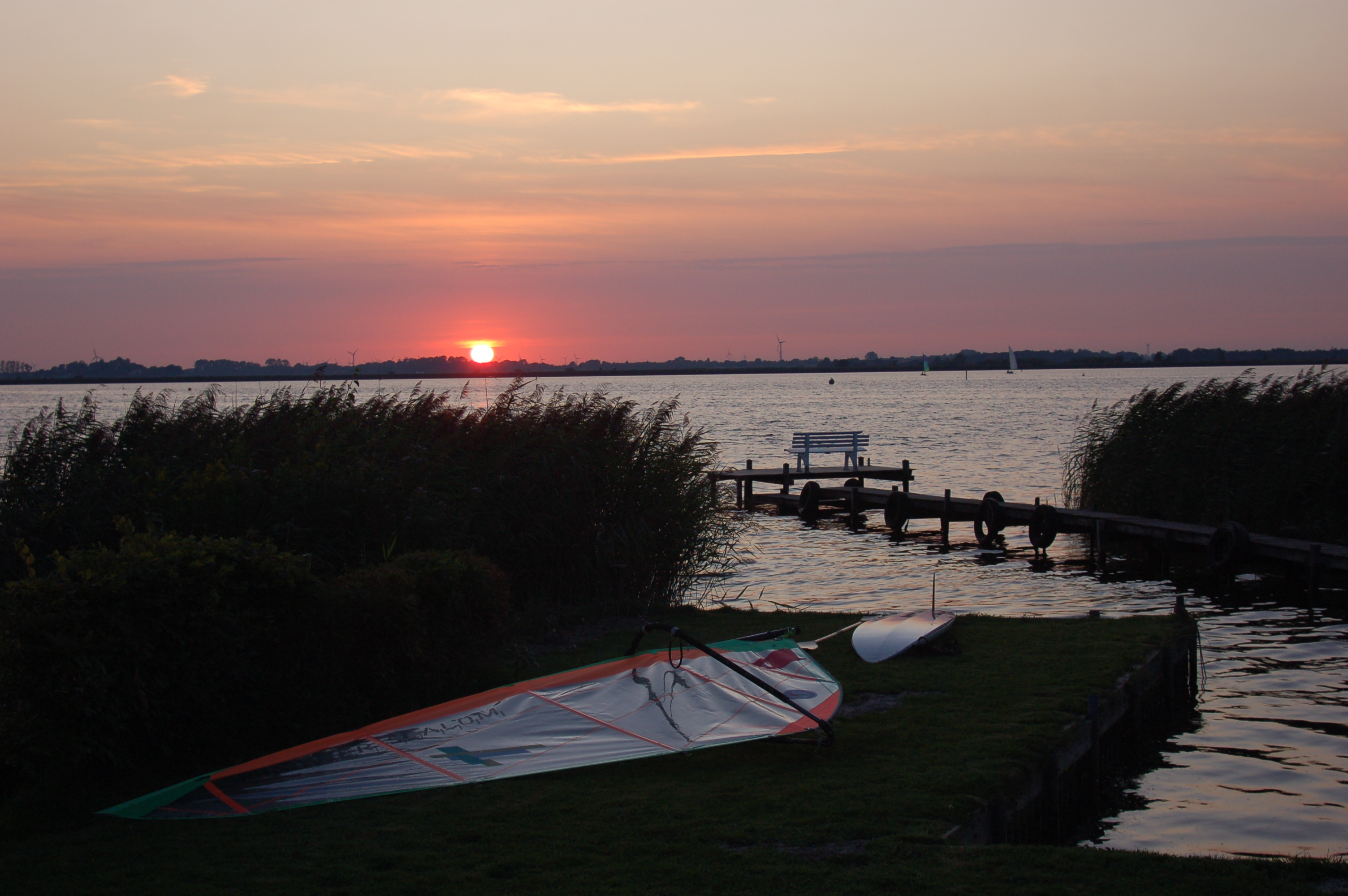
Dusk on the Kleines Meer

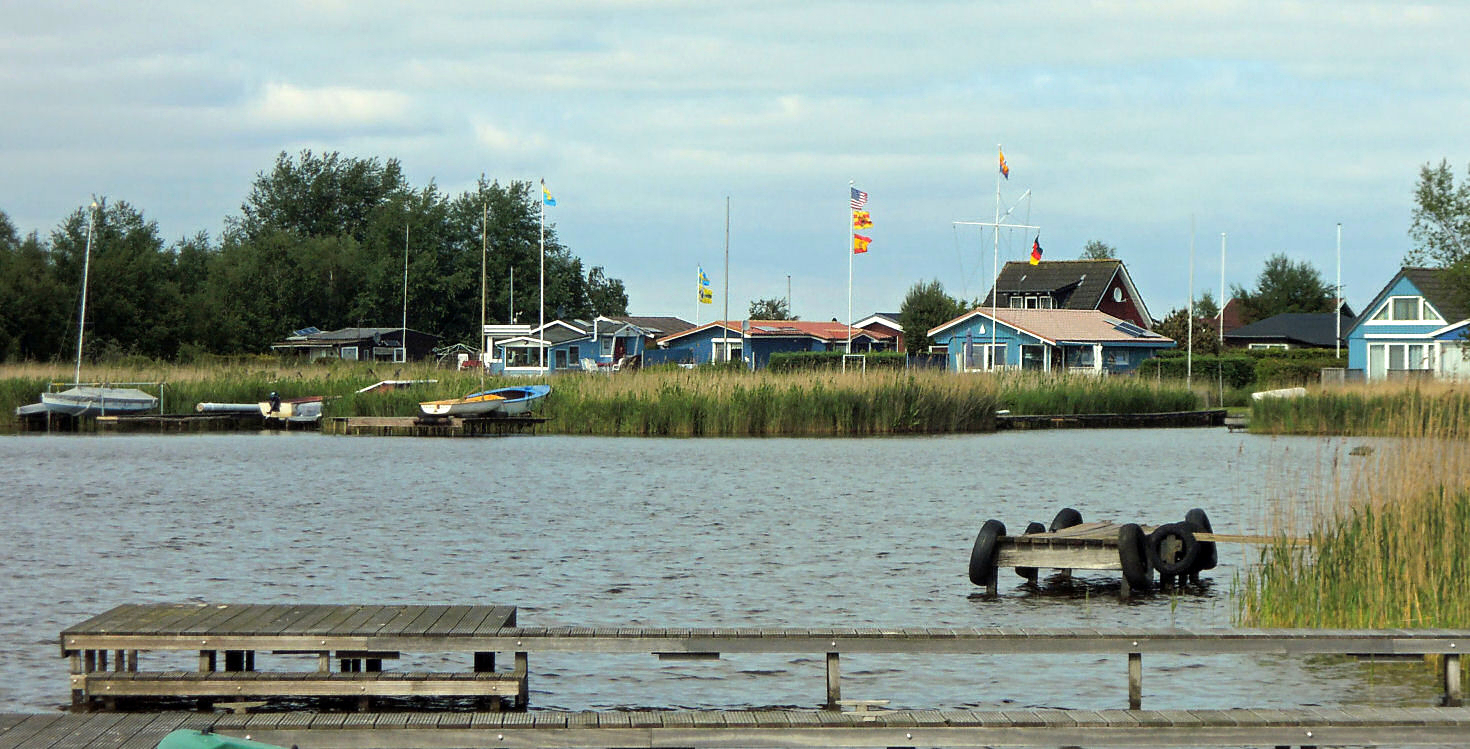
Meerbuden on the northeastern shore, with jetties, June 2013

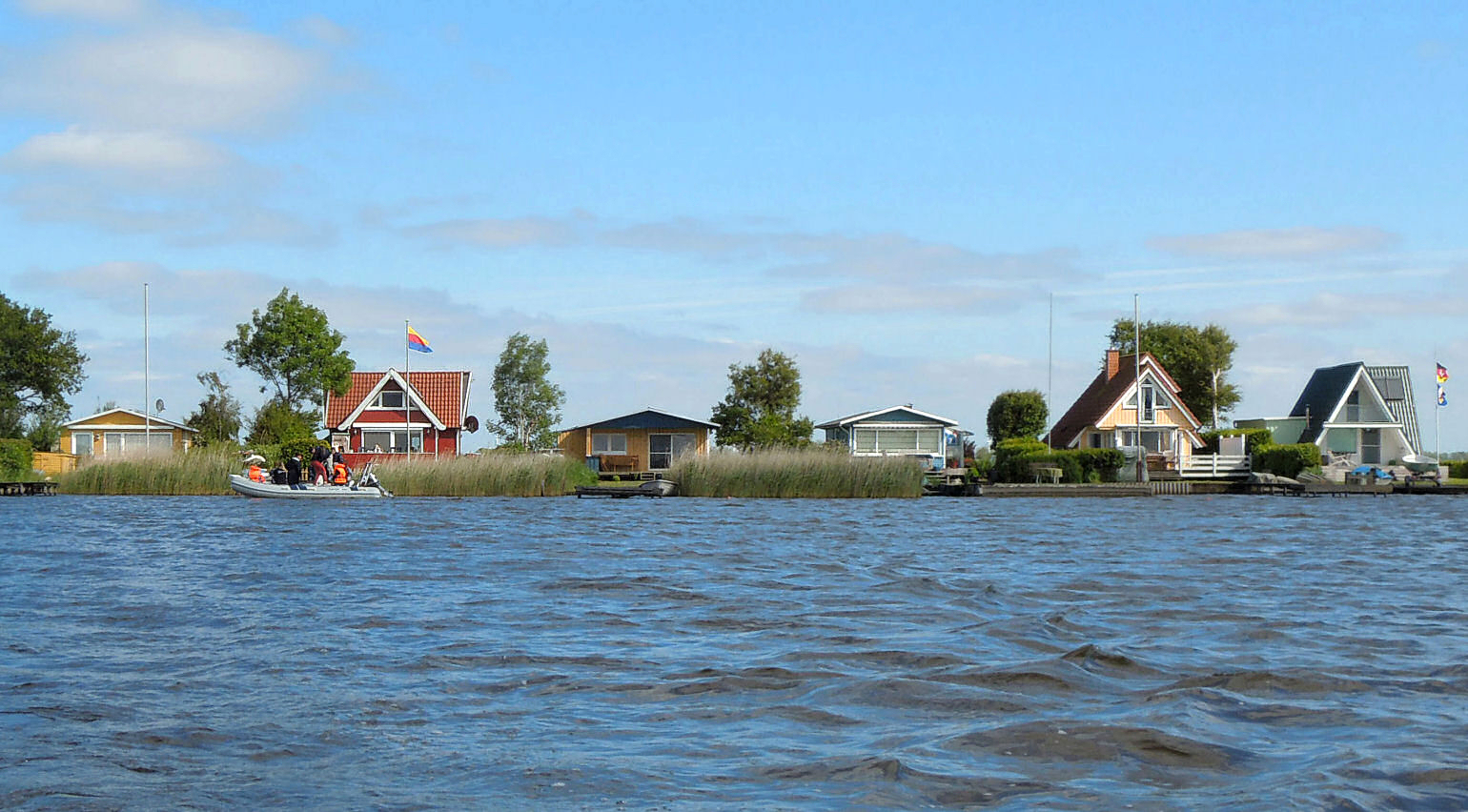
Meerbuden on the northeastern shore, June 2013

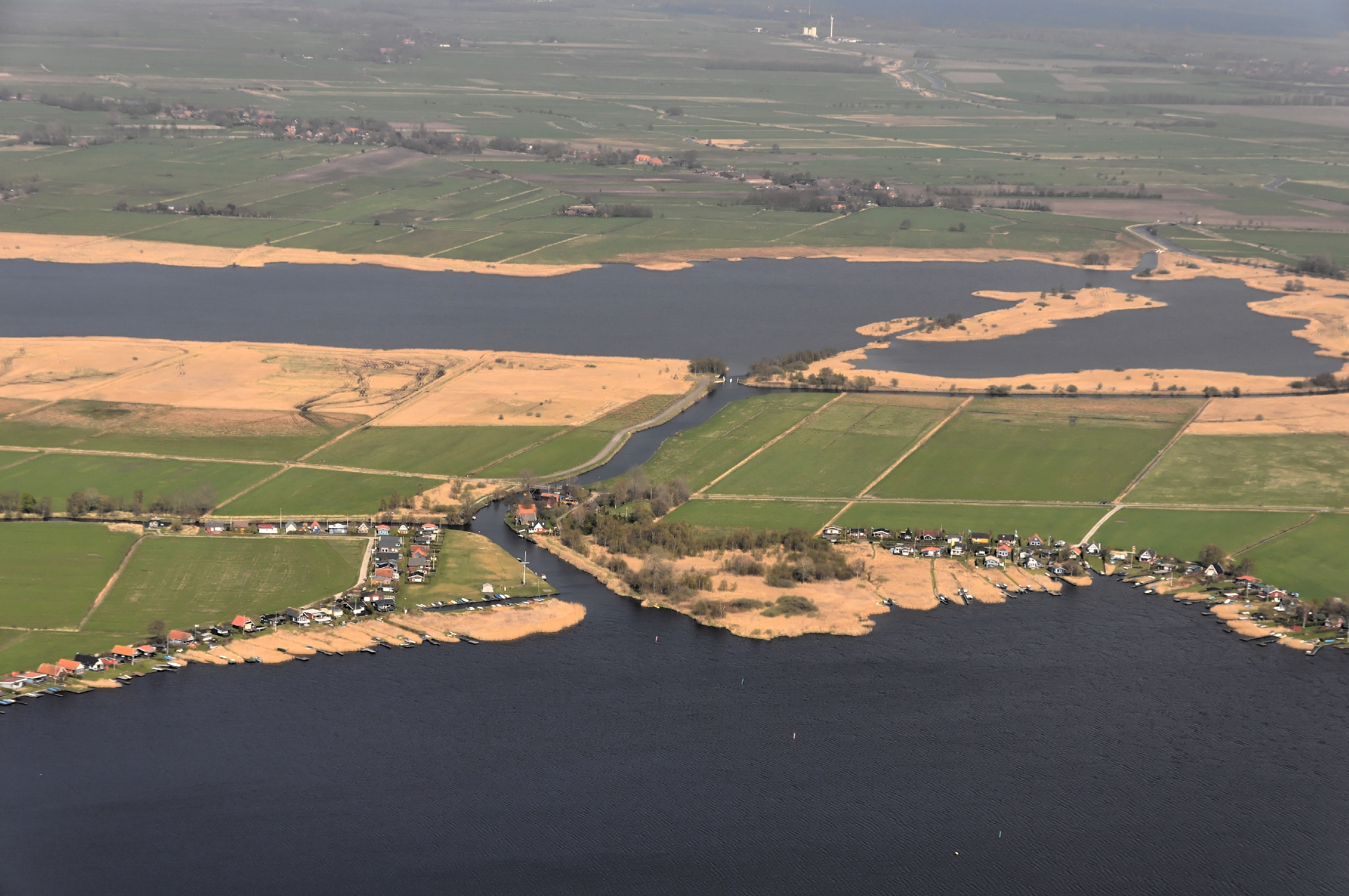
Inlet from the Großes Meer (background) into the Kleines Meer (foreground), May 2013

== See also ==
- List of lakes of Germany
