= Marienwehr =

- District of Emden
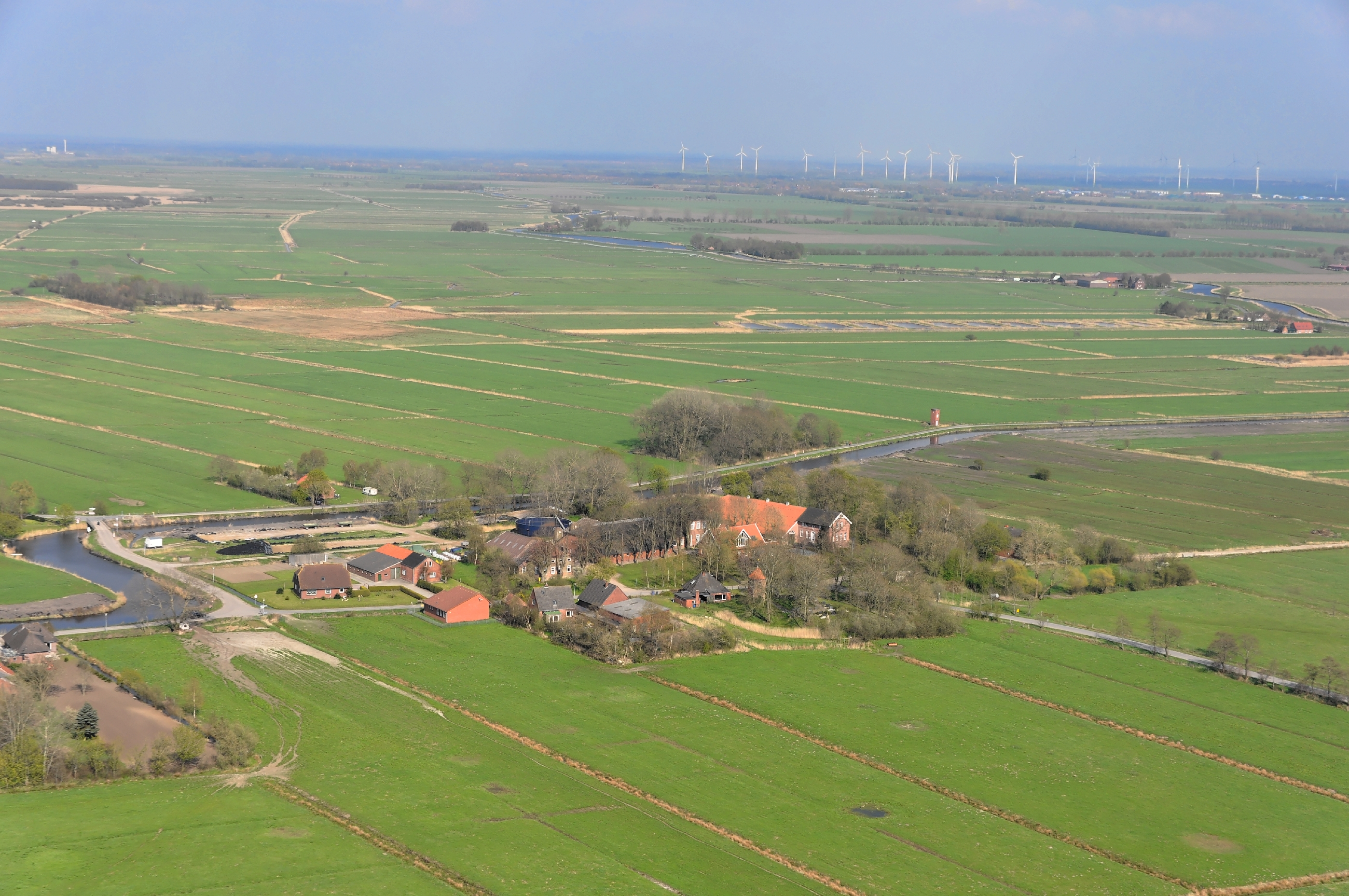
- Aerial view of Marienwehr

- Location of Uphusen-Marienwehr within Emden
- Interactive map of Marienwehr
- Location within Germany Location within Lower Saxony
- Coordinates: 53.39594°N 7.25474°E
- Country: Germany
- State: Lower Saxony
- City: Emden

Population
  - Metro: 40
- Time zone: UTC+01:00 (CET)
  - Summer (DST): UTC+02:00 (CEST)
- Dialling codes: 04921
- Vehicle registration: 26725

Marienwehr is a small village in Lower Saxony, Germany. The East Frisian village is currently a borough (Stadtteil) of the city of Emden together with Uphusen. The village is located on a warft

Shortly before the start of the Second World War and especially in the years immediately afterwards, new settlement houses were built northeast of the village center, on the shore of the lake called Kleines Meer ('Little Lake').
