= Battle of Detern =

1426 battle

- Part of East Frisian Wars of Independence
Date	27 September 1426
Location	near Detern
Result	Victory for the rebelling East Frisians

Belligerents
Rebelling East Frisians	Brokmerland and Auricherland

Commanders and leaders
Focko Ukena; Sibet von Rüstringen	Ocko II tom Brok

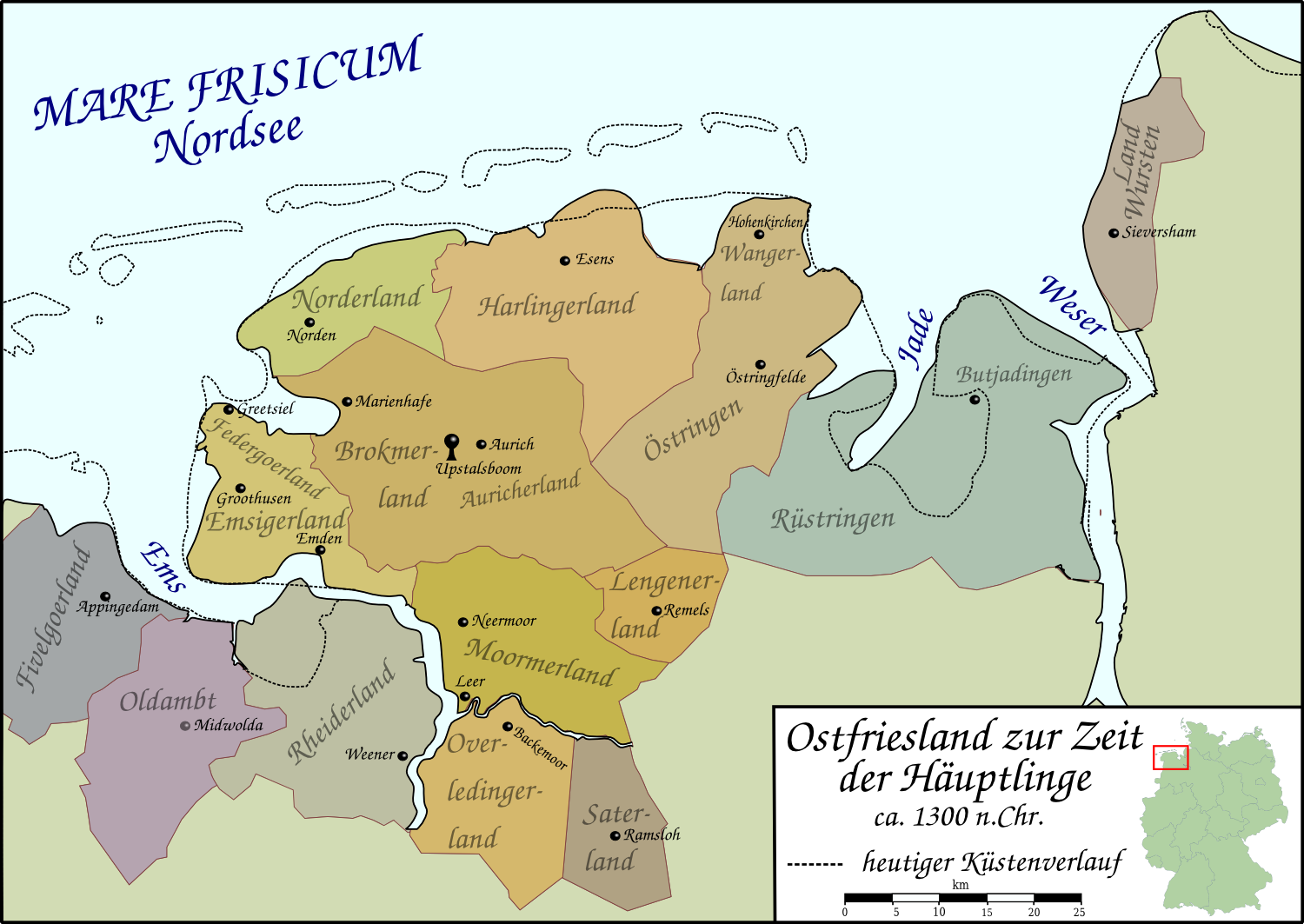
Map in 1300

The Battle of Detern (German: Schlacht von Detern) on 27 September 1426 marked the prelude to the East Frisian rebellion against the rule of the tom Brok family over East Frisia.

During the course of the battle, an East Frisian peasant army under Focko Ukena and Sibet of Rüstringen defeated the Oldenburg troops called by Chieftain Ocko II tom Brok to assist him, the Archbishop of Bremen and the counts of Hoya, Diepholz and Tecklenburg, who had besieged Detern. Focko Ukena – a former henchman of Ocko – thrashed the combined Bremen–Oldenburg cavalry force, after Count Dietrich of Oldenburg deserted his allies during the battle. Count Johann von Rietberg, the second son of Otto II of Rietberg and Conrad X of Diepholz fell in battle. and Archbishop Nicholas of Oldenburg-Delmenhorst was captured, but released after negotiations with the Bremen town council.
