= Forlitz-Blaukirchen =

- Village of Südbrookmerland
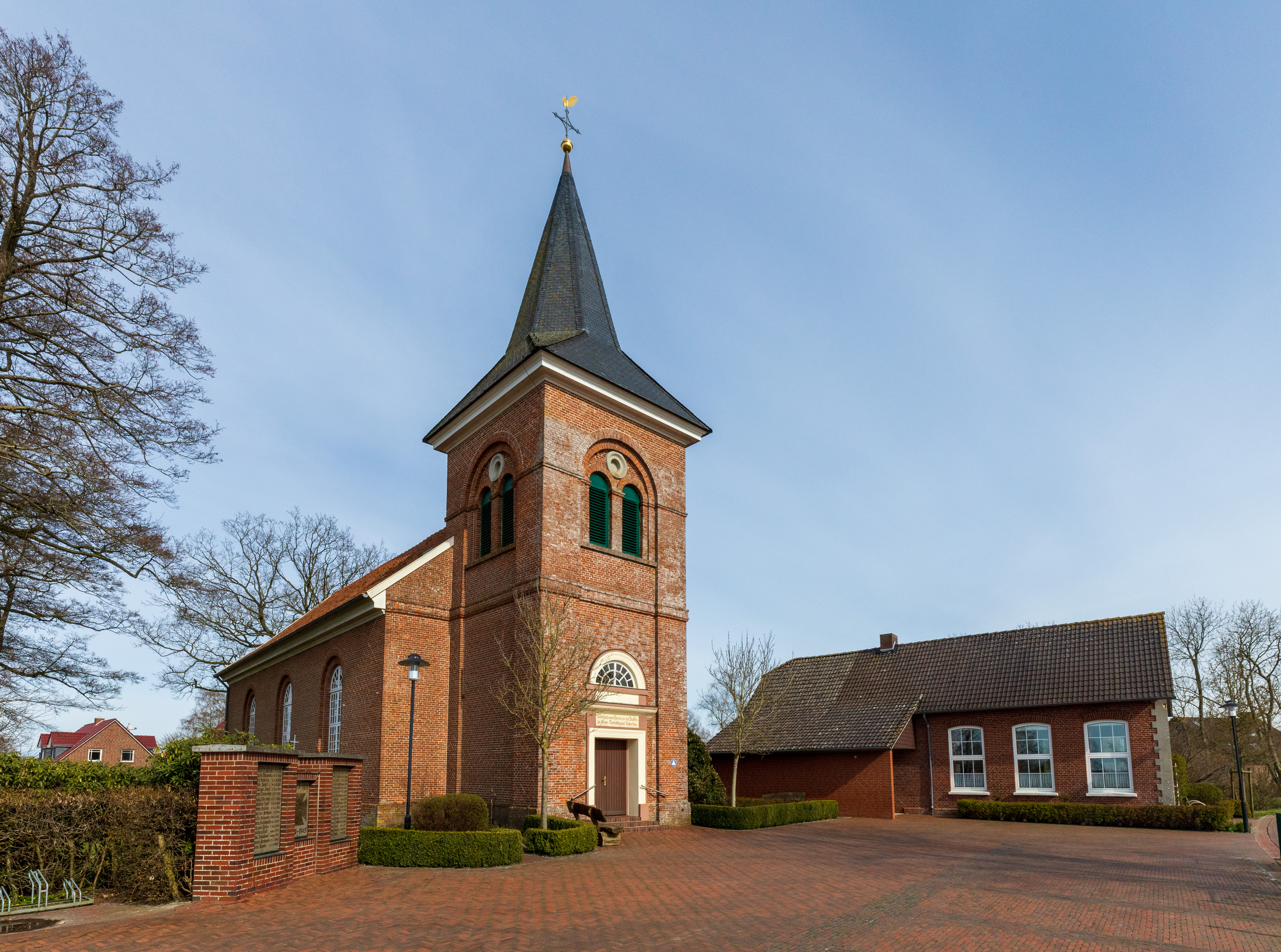
- Lutheran Church

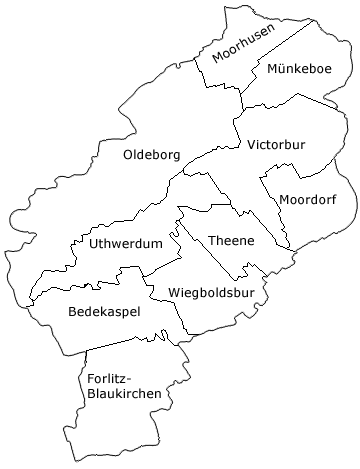
- Ortsteile of Südbrookmerland
- Interactive map of Forlitz-Blaukirchen
- Location within Germany Location within Lower Saxony
- Coordinates: 53.42188°N 7.32214°E
- Country: Germany
- State: Lower Saxony
- District: Aurich
- Municipality: Südbrookmerland

Population
  - Metro: 220
- Time zone: UTC+01:00 (CET)
  - Summer (DST): UTC+02:00 (CEST)
- Dialling codes: 04942
- Vehicle registration: 26624

Forlitz-Blaukirchen is an East Frisian village in Lower Saxony, Germany. It is an Ortsteil of the municipality of Südbrookmerland. It is located to the east of the Großes Meer.

Forlitz-Blaukirchen was an independent municipality until it was incorporated into the municipality of Südbrookmerland on 1 July 1972.
