= Bedekaspel =

- Village of Südbrookmerland
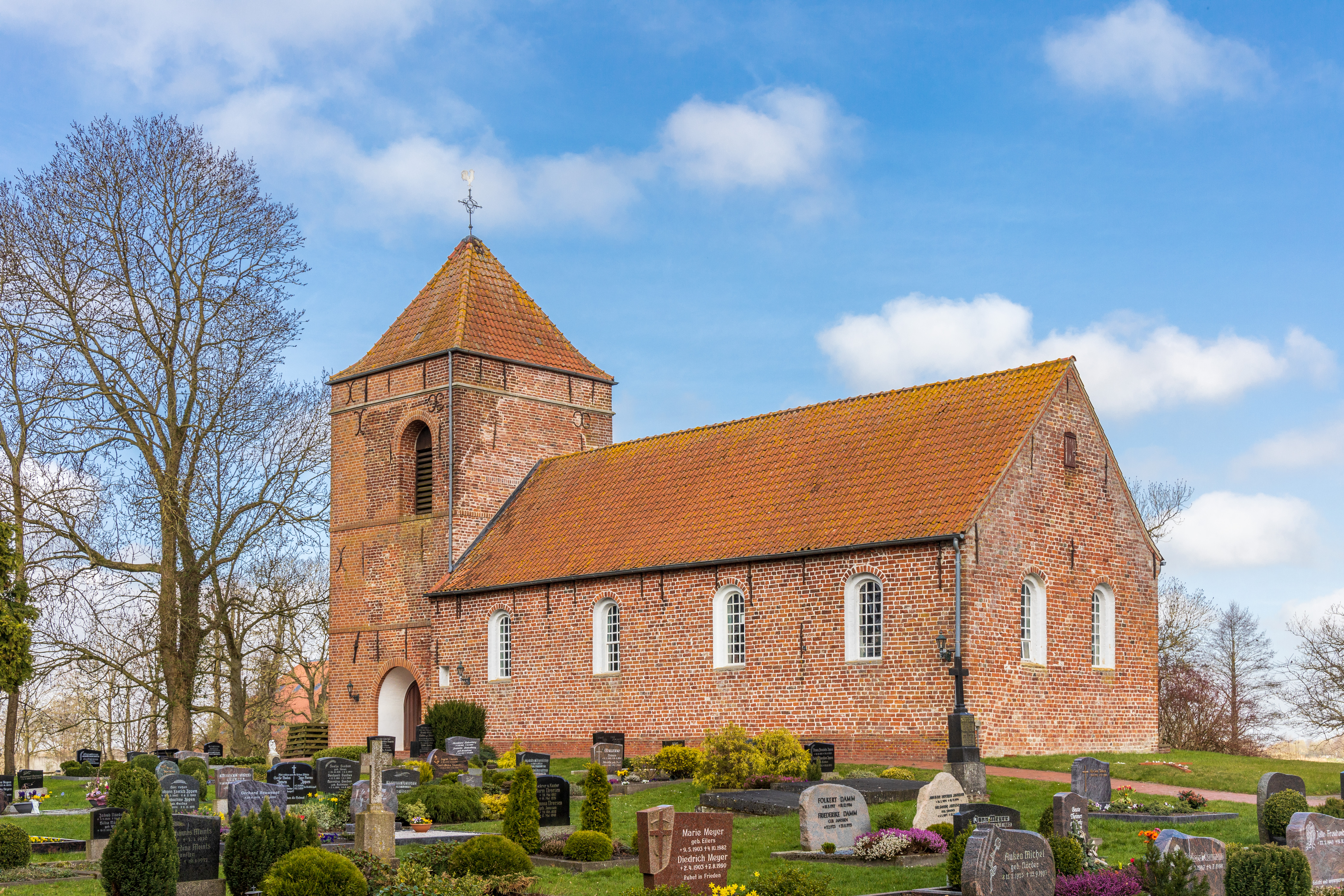
- Bedekaspel Church

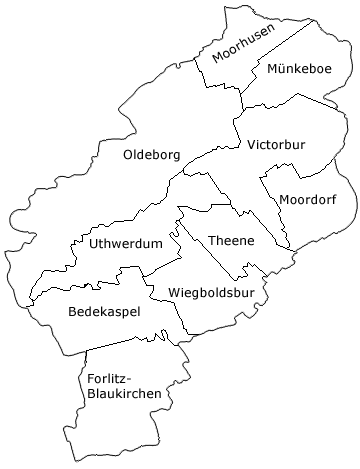
- Ortsteile of Südbrookmerland
- Interactive map of Bedekaspel
- Location within Germany Location within Lower Saxony
- Coordinates: 53.43749°N 7.31156°E
- Country: Germany
- State: Lower Saxony
- District: Aurich
- Municipality: Südbrookmerland
- Elevation: 0 m (0 ft)

Population
  - Metro: 354
- Time zone: UTC+01:00 (CET)
  - Summer (DST): UTC+02:00 (CEST)
- Dialling codes: 04942
- Vehicle registration: 26624

Bedekaspel is an East Frisian village in Lower Saxony, Germany. It is an Ortsteil of the municipality of Südbrookmerland. It is located near the Großes Meer. A Haufendorf, the village of Bedekaspel includes Wochenendsiedlung ("Weekend Settlement"), a recreational area on the northern shore of the Großes Meer, and Bedekaspeler Marsch.

Bedekaspel was an independent municipality until it was incorporated into the municipality of Südbrookmerland on 1 July 1972.

== History ==
The settlement was first officially mentioned in 1475 as Betekerke and recorded around 1500 as Bedekerspell. Lopessumwalde may have been an earlier name for the village. The current name has been documented since 1595. The name Beede-Kirchspiel also appeared in the Emden city archives in 1645. The name was probably derived from Old Frisian bēte, "penitence", and kerke, "church", which can be assumed due to the growth of the settlement to parish (Middle Low German: kaspel, karkspel, kerk-spel). The original meaning is therefore "penitence church". The element –spiel or -spel goes back to a Germanic noun *spella, which means "report", "message", or "speech". The parish or kaspel is therefore the district in which a pastor preaches.

During the Christmas flood of 1717, the Bedekaspel church, which dates back to the 13th century, was so badly damaged that it had to be demolished and rebuilt – except for the tower.

== Gallery ==
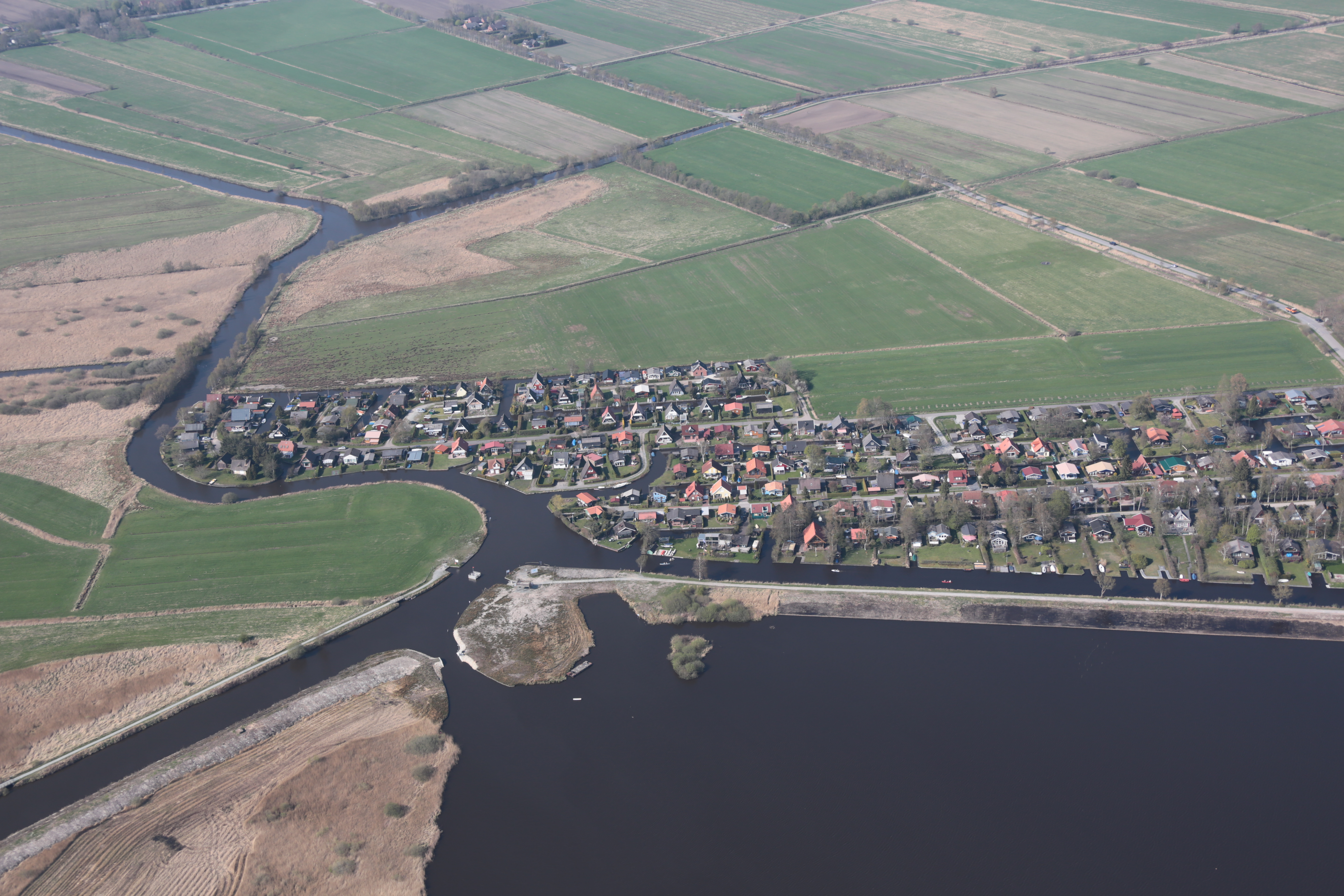
Aerial view of Wochenendsiedlung

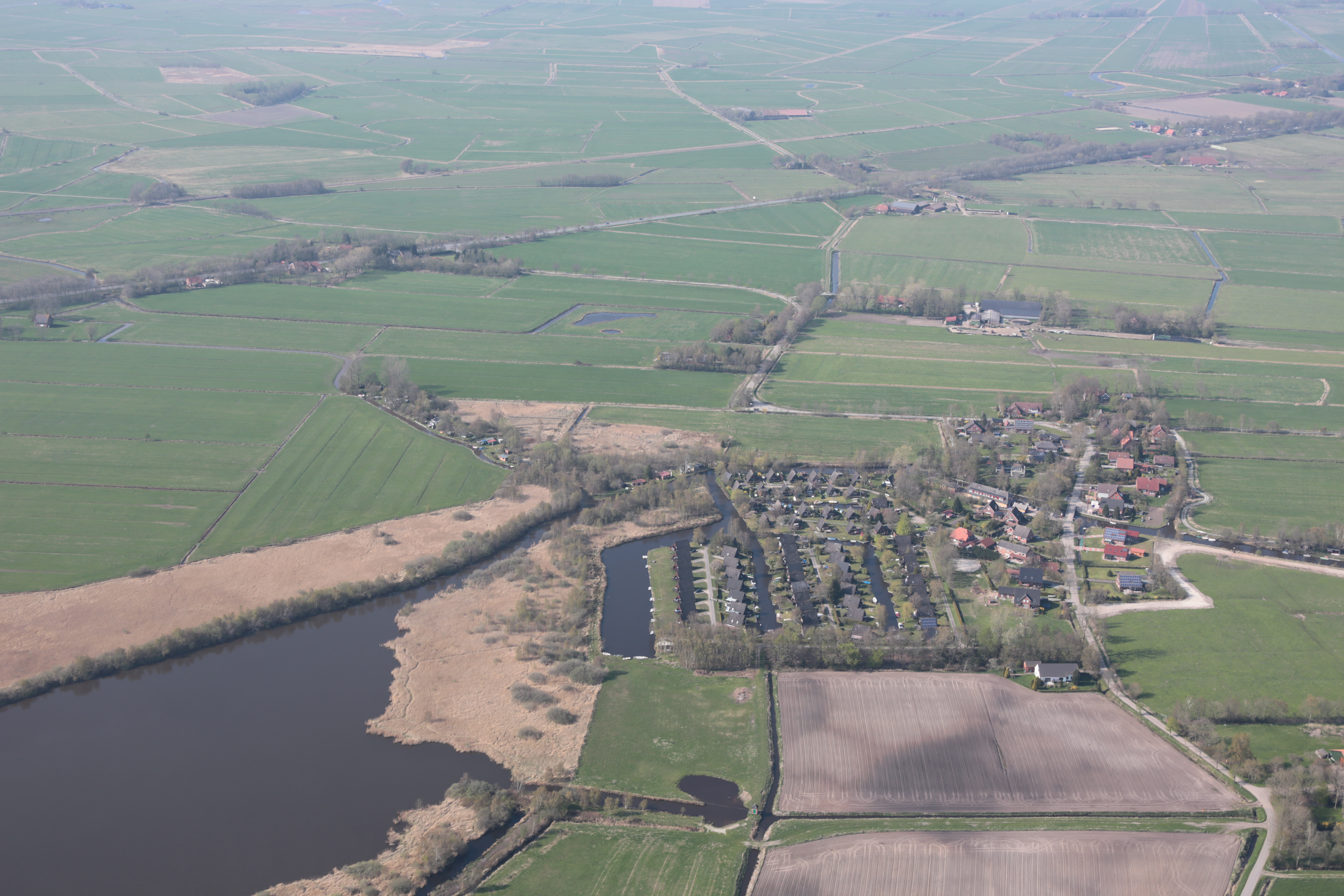
Aerial view of Bedekaspeler Marsch

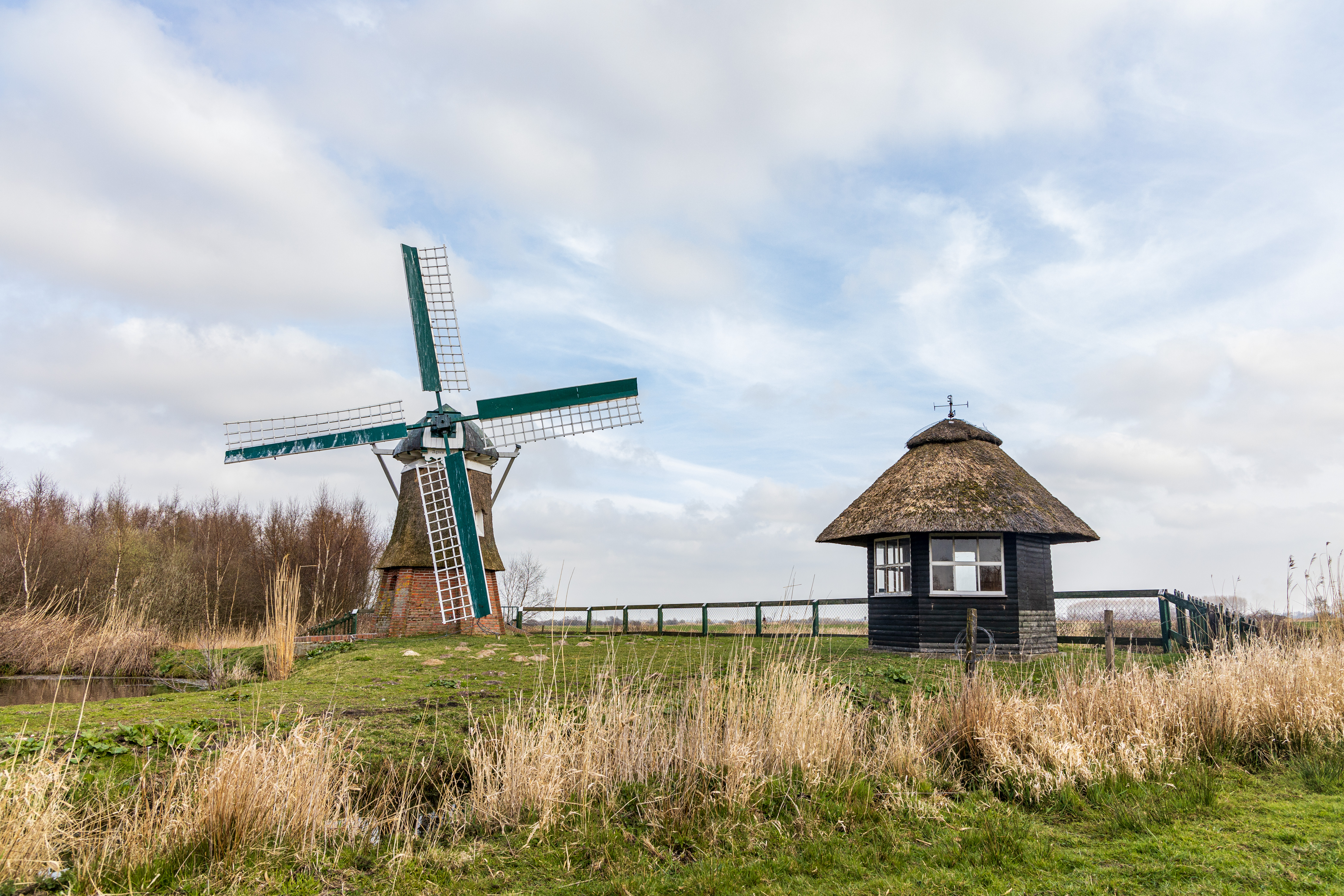
Windmill Agnes

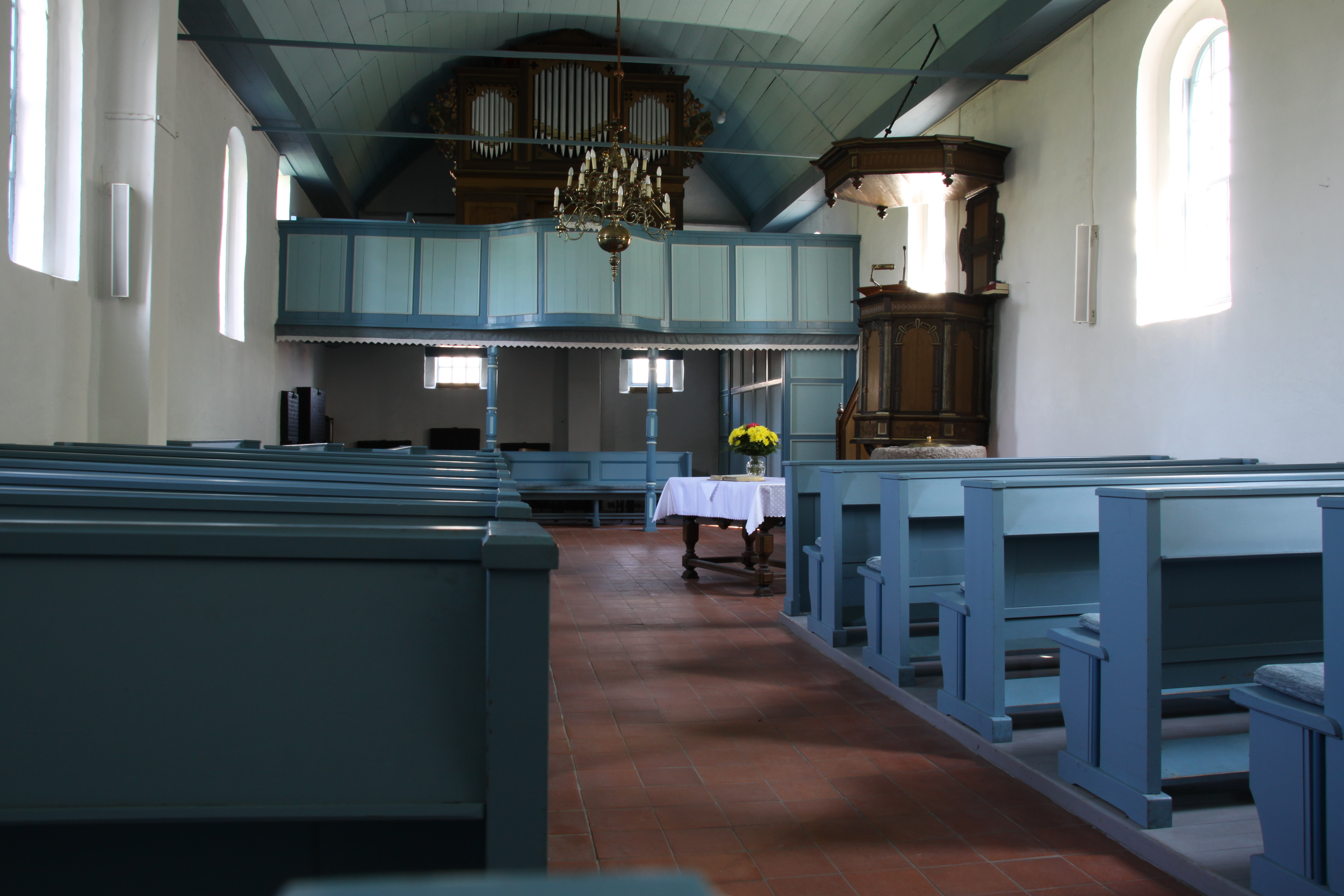
Interior of the church
