= Uphusen =

- District of Emden
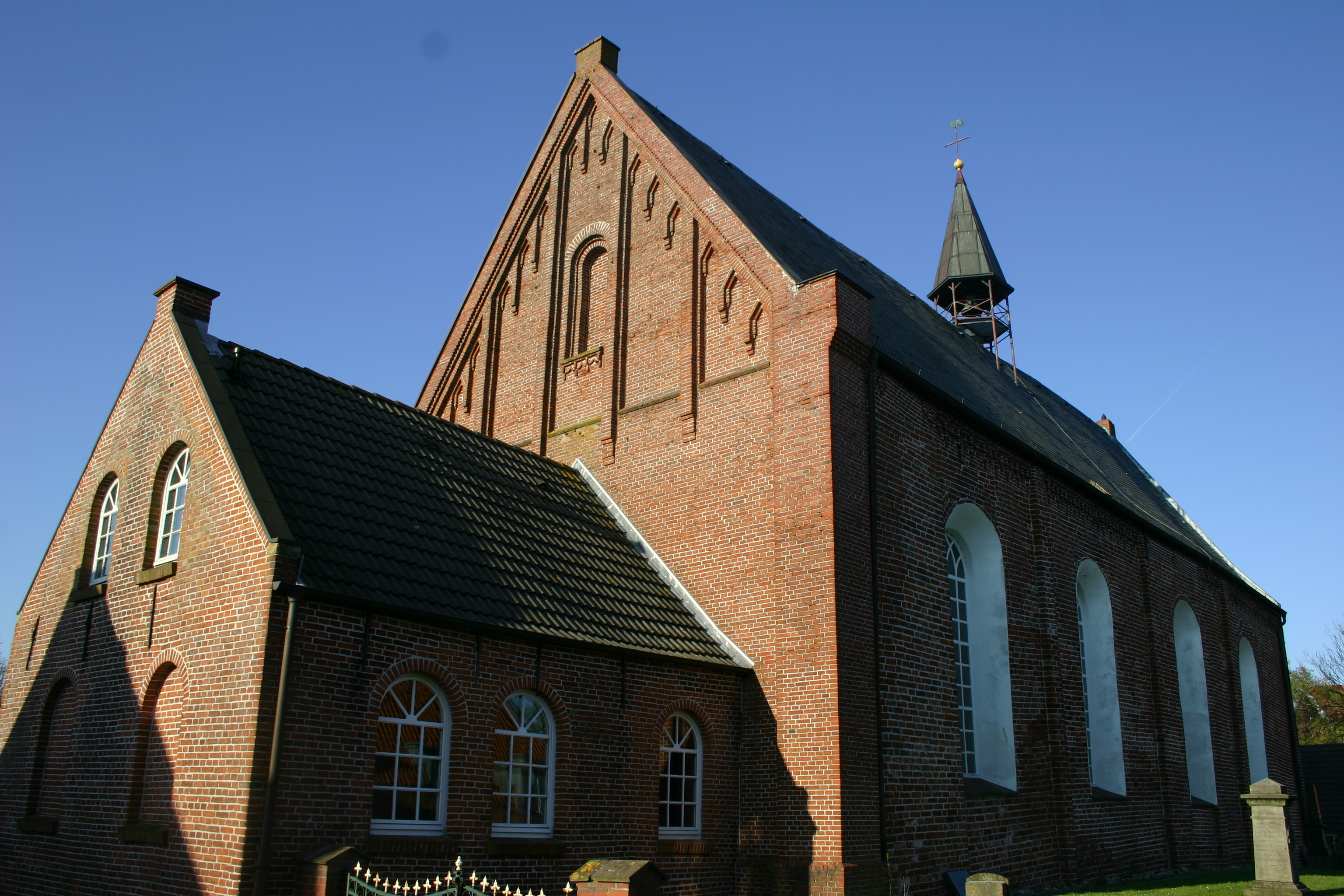
- Church of Uphusen

- Location of Uphusen-Marienwehr within Emden
- Interactive map of Uphusen
- Location within Germany Location within Lower Saxony
- Coordinates: 53.37682°N 7.25083°E
- Country: Germany
- State: Lower Saxony
- City: Emden

Population
  - Metro: 817
- Time zone: UTC+01:00 (CET)
  - Summer (DST): UTC+02:00 (CEST)
- Dialling codes: 04921
- Vehicle registration: 26725

Uphusen is a village in Lower Saxony, Germany. The East Frisian village is currently a borough (Stadtteil) of the city of Emden together with Marienwehr.

Uphusen was originally a village built on a warft. The current warft, with the church on it, was created from three smaller mounds. The current church dates from the fifteenth century. This replaced an earlier church from the thirteenth century that was said to have been demolished and rebuilt in Veenhusen.

The name of the place is a combination of up ('higher') and husen ('houses'), therefore meaning “higher located houses”.

== Gallery ==
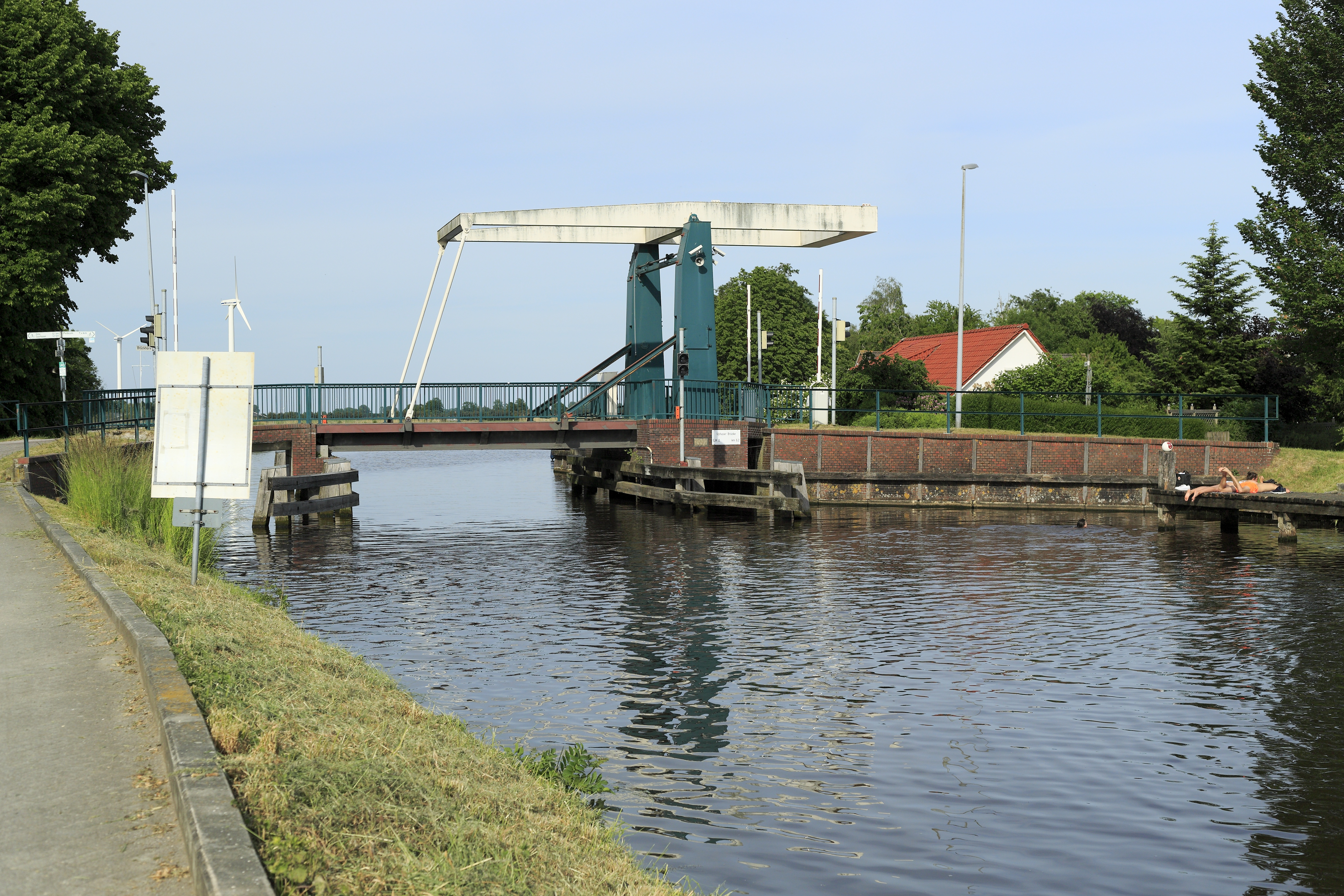
Bridge near Uphusen

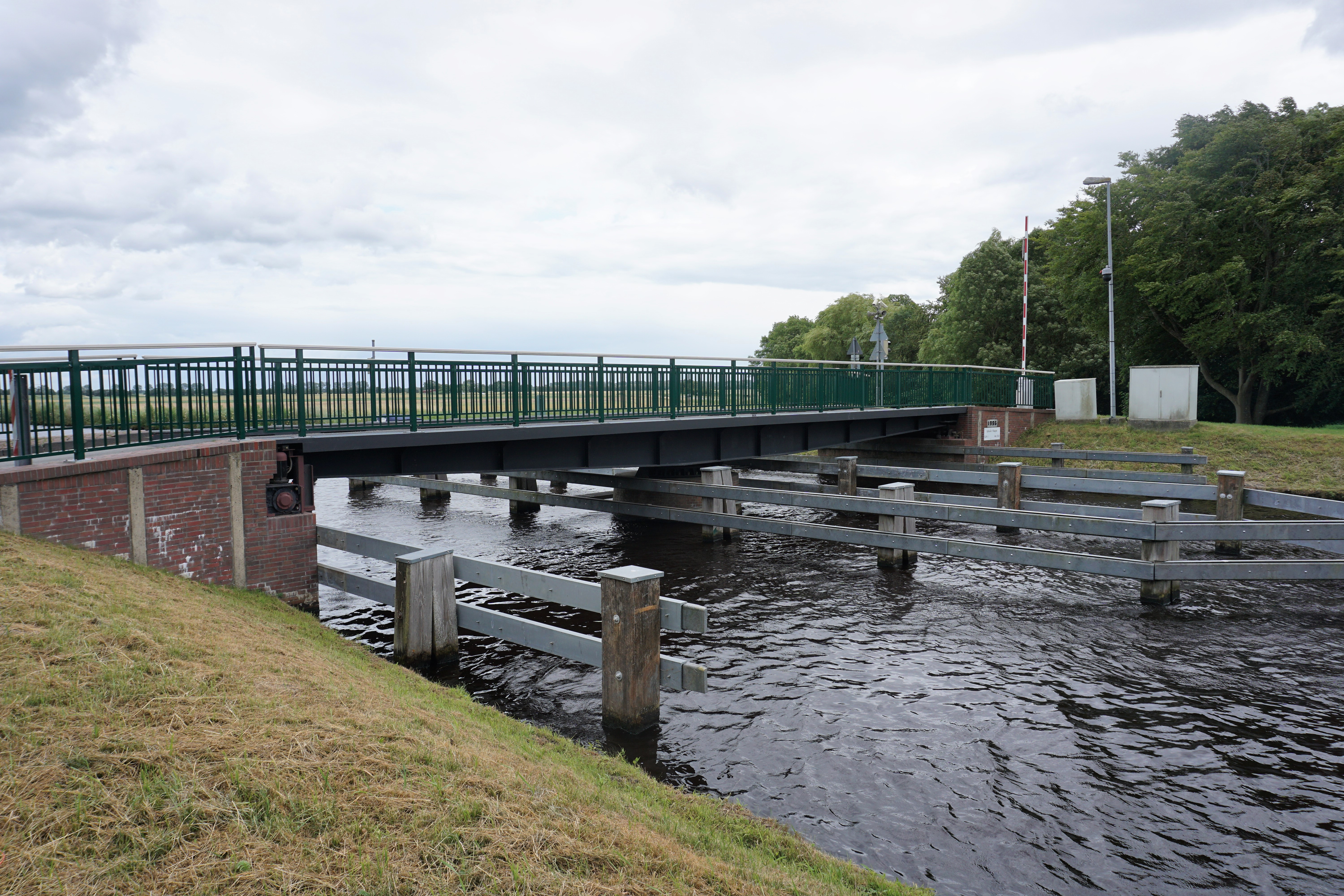
Bridge near Uphusen

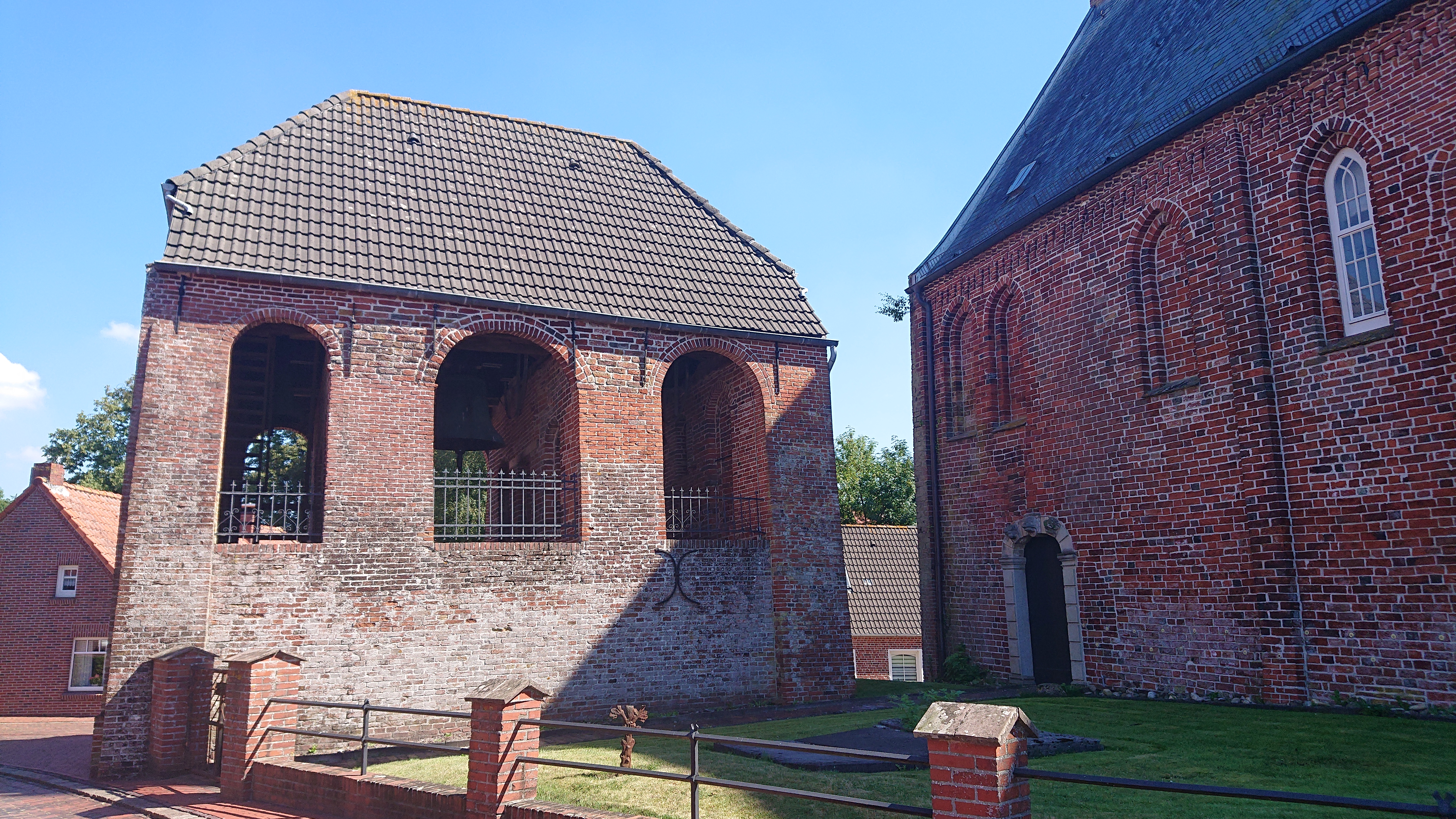
Church of Uphusen
