= Sandwater =

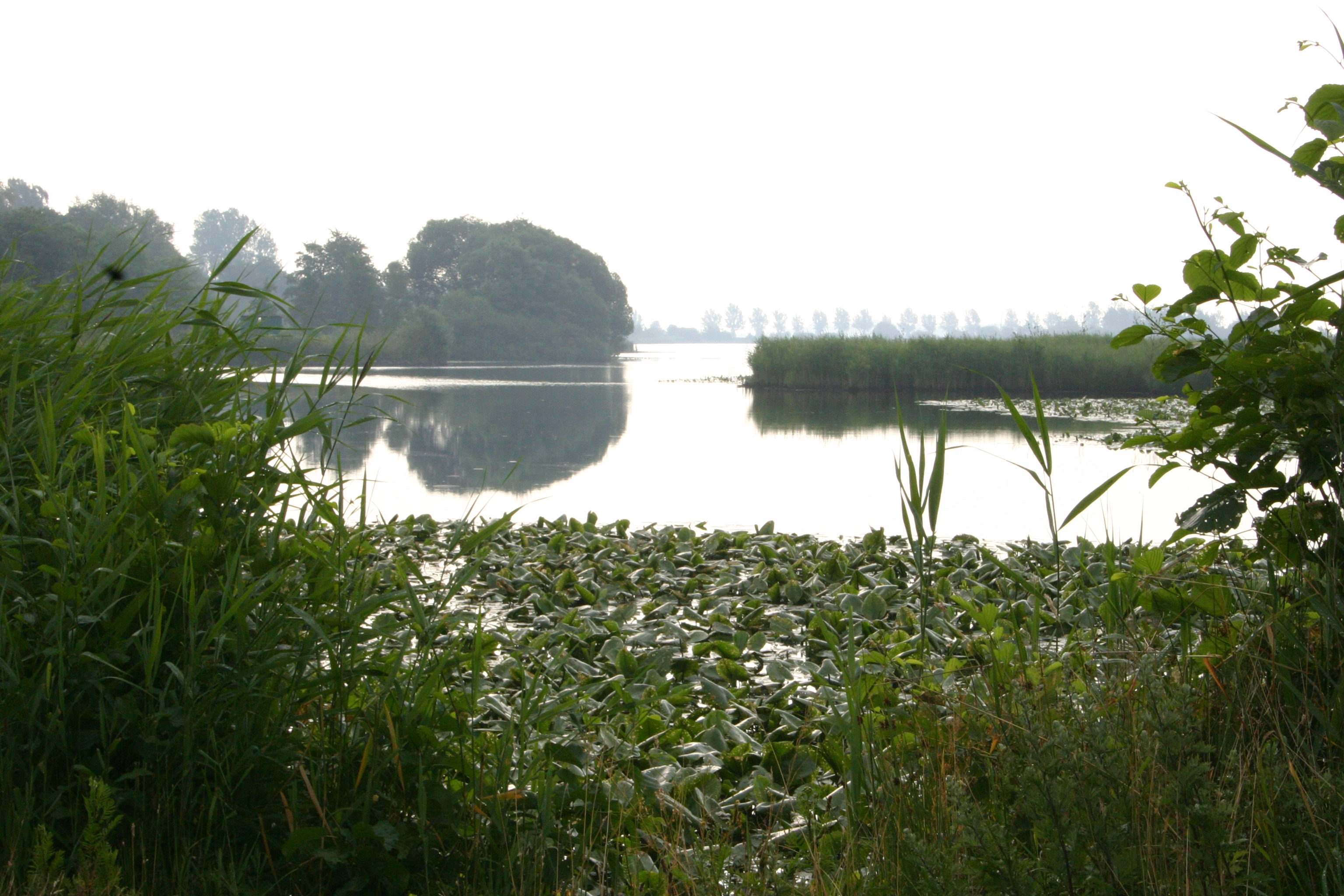
- The Sandwater seen from the west

- Location within Germany
- Location: Aurich District, Germany
- Coordinates: 53°22′6″N 7°25′1″E
- Type: lake

The Sandwater near Simonswolde (in the municipality of Ihlow) in the north German district of Aurich is a shallow fen lake on the edge of the geest and is one of the few remaining, preserved, natural "inland seas" in East Frisia. The lake was formed probably during the warm climatic period of the Atlantic (period) about 5000 years ago, then disappeared temporarily after land uplifting and climate changes, only to reappear about 2000 years ago.

Since 1973 the Sandwater and several surrounding wetland areas with a total area of 59 hectares (150 acres) have been designated as a nature reserve. The extensive reed beds have an important function in providing nesting and feeding grounds for reed breeders and waterfowl. The expanding beds of common reed, however, are causing the lake to gradually silt up and reduce the area of open water - currently still about 0.223 square kilometres (22.3 ha; 55 acres). Here large carpets of floating plants - the White and Yellow Water Lilies - dominate the scene, and also accelerate the accumulation of mud and silt. Since the lake was dyked at the beginning of the 1960s and the surrounding area drained, the original hydrology and eutrophication of the lake has changed considerably. Previously the Sandwater had a particularly rich variety of underwater flora which produced relatively nutrient-rich, clean water (c.f. its name!), for example it contained many rare species of pondweed as well as von Floating Water-plantain (Luronium natans) and Lesser Water-plantain (Baldellia ranunculoides). Today plants such as Frogbit, Water Violet, Flowering Rush and Arrowhead may be seen.

== Sources ==
van Dieken, Jan (1970). Beiträge zur Flora Nordwestdeutschlands unter besonderer Berücksichtigung Ostfrieslands. Verlag C. L. Mettcker & Söhne, Jever. [ISBN unspecified] (possibly out of print)
