= Großes Meer =

Lake in Südbrookmerland, Lower Saxony, Germany

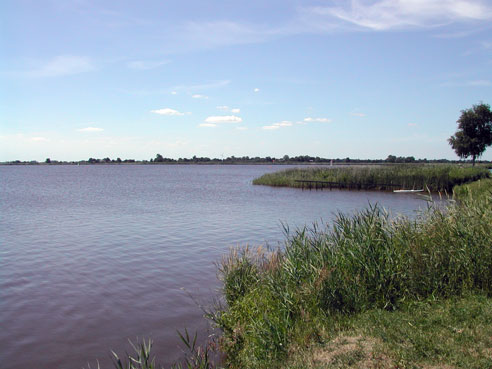

- Location within Lower Saxony
- Location: Südbrookmerland, Ostfriesland
- Coordinates: 53°25′51″N 7°17′40″E
- Primary inflows: various
- Primary outflows: Heikeschloot → Kleines Meer; Knockster Tief
- Surface area: 2.89 km^{2} (1.12 sq mi)
- Average depth: 1 m (3 ft 3 in)
- Surface elevation: −1.4 m (−4.6 ft)
- Settlements: Bedekaspel, Emden, Aurich

The Großes Meer is a naturally formed fen lake (Niedermoorsee) in north Germany that lies between Aurich and Emden near Bedekaspel in the Südbrookmerland region, on the edge of the East Frisian Geest where it transitions to the Ems marshes. The lake is the fourth largest in the state of Lower Saxony with an area of open water of about 289 hectares (710 acres) (and reed bed covering about 400 hectares (990 acres)). The Großes Meer is – apart from a few deeper spots – only 0.5 to 1.0 metre deep. It is divided into two, almost separate, bodies of water (northern and southern sections). One feature is that the average water level lies 1.4 metres below sea level due to artificial drainage.

The nature reserve of South Großes Meer (Südteil Großes Meer) was established in 1974 and is surrounded by a 2,500 hectares (6,200 acres) large protected landscape. The northern part, by contrast, is used as a leisure and recreation area and has facilities for angling and water sports. It may not be used by motor boats, however.

With its extensive belt of reed-beds and the adjacent wetlands the Großes Meer and its surrounds are a breeding area and habitat of regional importance. Black-tailed godwit, snipe, lapwing, short-eared owl, marsh harrier, hen harrier, bittern, sedge warbler, bluethroat and reed bunting are a few of the species of breeding bird that are important from a conservation perspective. In winter huge flocks of greylag geese and greater white-fronted geese shelter here.

Southwest of the Großes Meer lies the Kleines Meer, also called the Hieve. West of the northern section of the Großes Meer is the Loppersumer Meer. The former Siersmeer and Heerenmeeder Meer in the southern part of the nature reserve have completely silted up and now form a large expanse of sedge with transitions to grey willow bushes.
