= Engerhafe =

- Village of Südbrookmerland
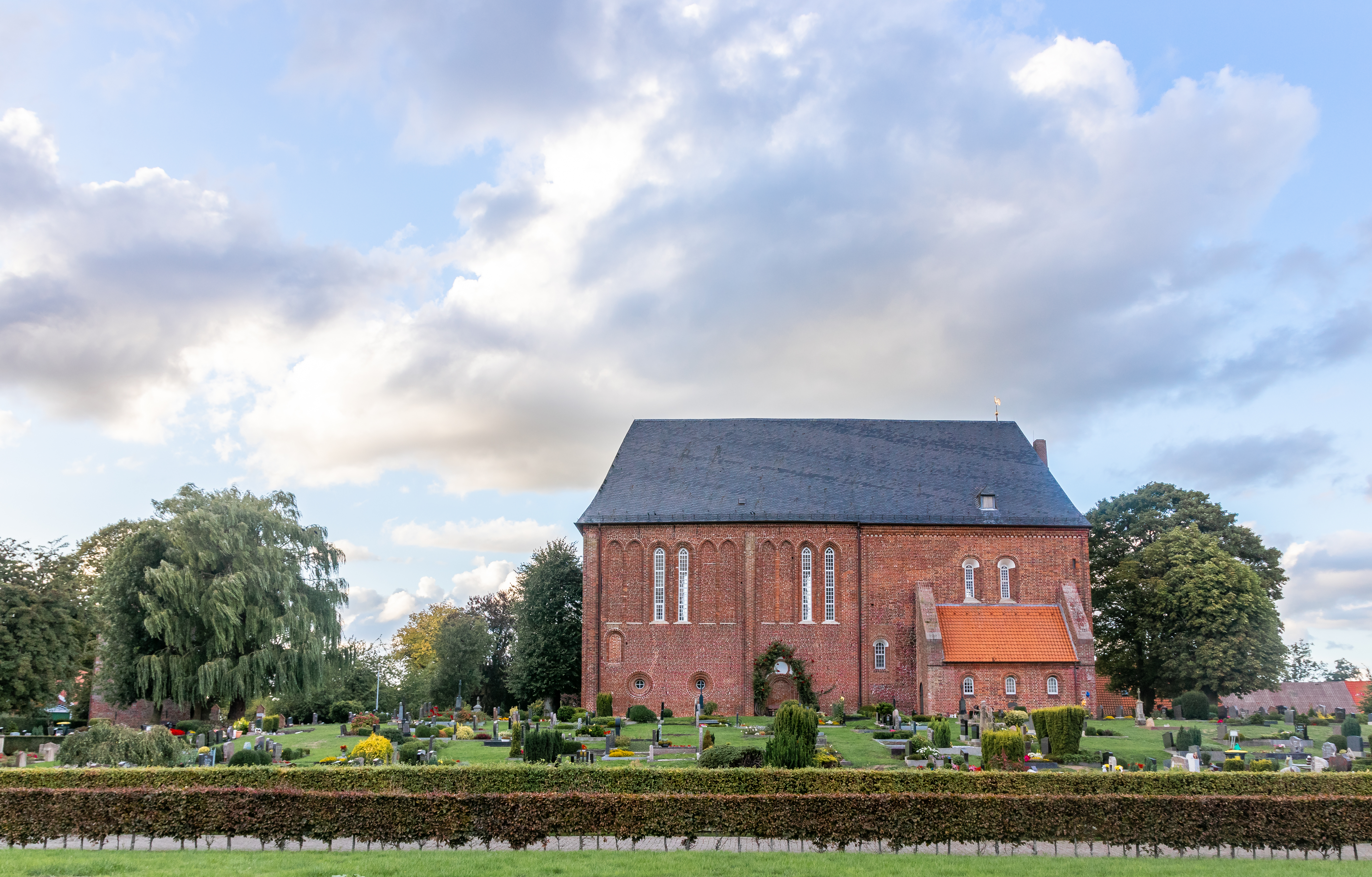
- John the Baptist Church
- Interactive map of Engerhafe
- Location within Germany Location within Lower Saxony
- Coordinates: 53.48542°N 7.29820°E
- Country: Germany
- State: Lower Saxony
- District: Aurich
- Municipality: Südbrookmerland
- Elevation: 1.3 m (4.3 ft)

Population
  - Metro: c. 600
- Time zone: UTC+01:00 (CET)
  - Summer (DST): UTC+02:00 (CEST)
- Dialling codes: 04942
- Vehicle registration: 26624

Engerhafe is an East Frisian village in Lower Saxony, Germany. It is part of the municipality of Südbrookmerland, administratively belonging to the Ortsteil of Oldeborg. The village is located on a spur of a Geest that runs through the middle of East Frisia.

== History ==
The village appears under the names Buta-Ee ("outside the Ee") and Uthengrahove ("hove" indicates a court location) in documents from the period between 1250 and 1276. The construction of the church of Engerhafe, dedicated to John the Baptist, also dates from that period. The church has a detached bell tower and a borg from the fifteenth century that serves as a rectory.

Since 1938, it has been part of the municipality of Oldeborg, together with the villages of Fehnhusen, Oldeborg, and Upende, which in turn has been an Ortsteil of the municipality of Südbrookmerland since 1972.

== Concentration camp ==
A concentration camp was built near the village in October 1944 as a branch of the Neuengamme camp. Around 2,000 people were interned in the camp under inhumane conditions, mainly resistance fighters, forced laborers, and hostages from the Netherlands. The camp inmates were put to work between October and December 1944 in the construction of the so-called Friesenwall, a defense line part of the Atlantic Wall that the Nazis built from the Dutch border to Denmark. When the camp was closed again in December, around 200 prisoners had not survived. The survivors were sent back to Neuengamme.

== Gallery ==
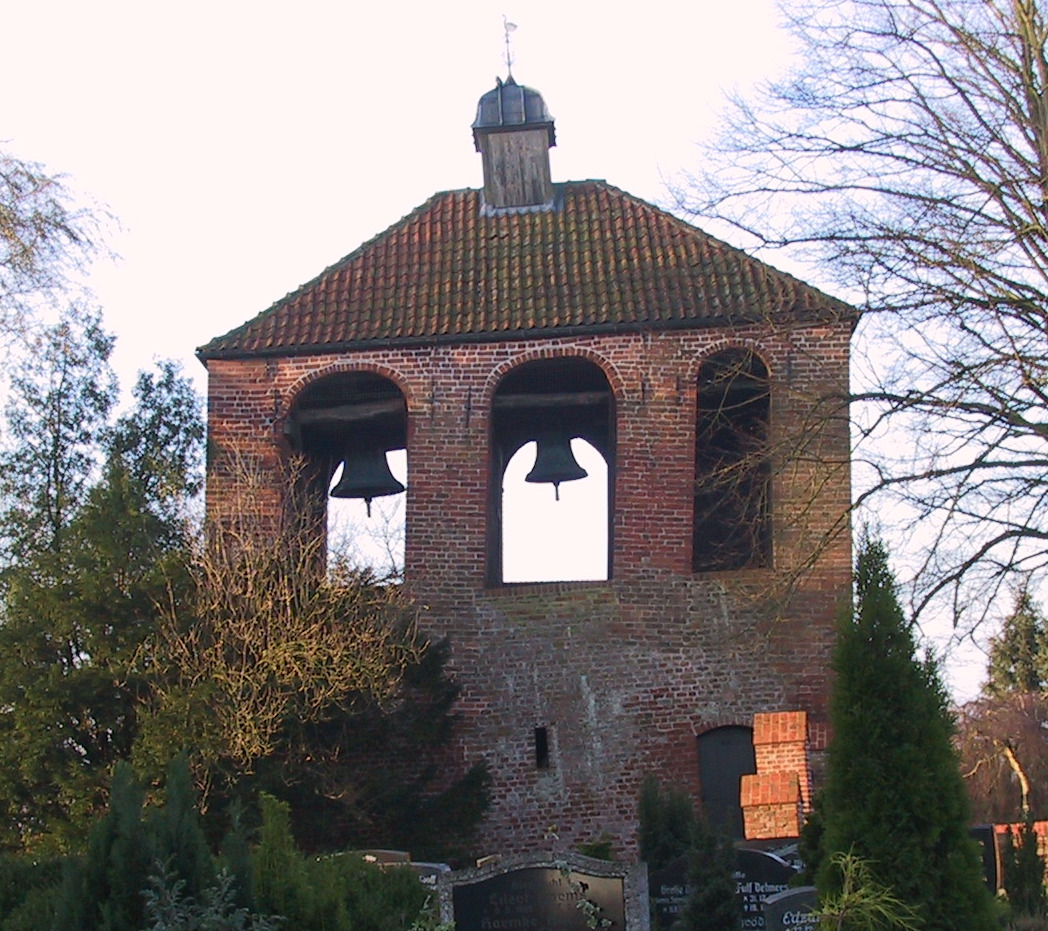
Church tower

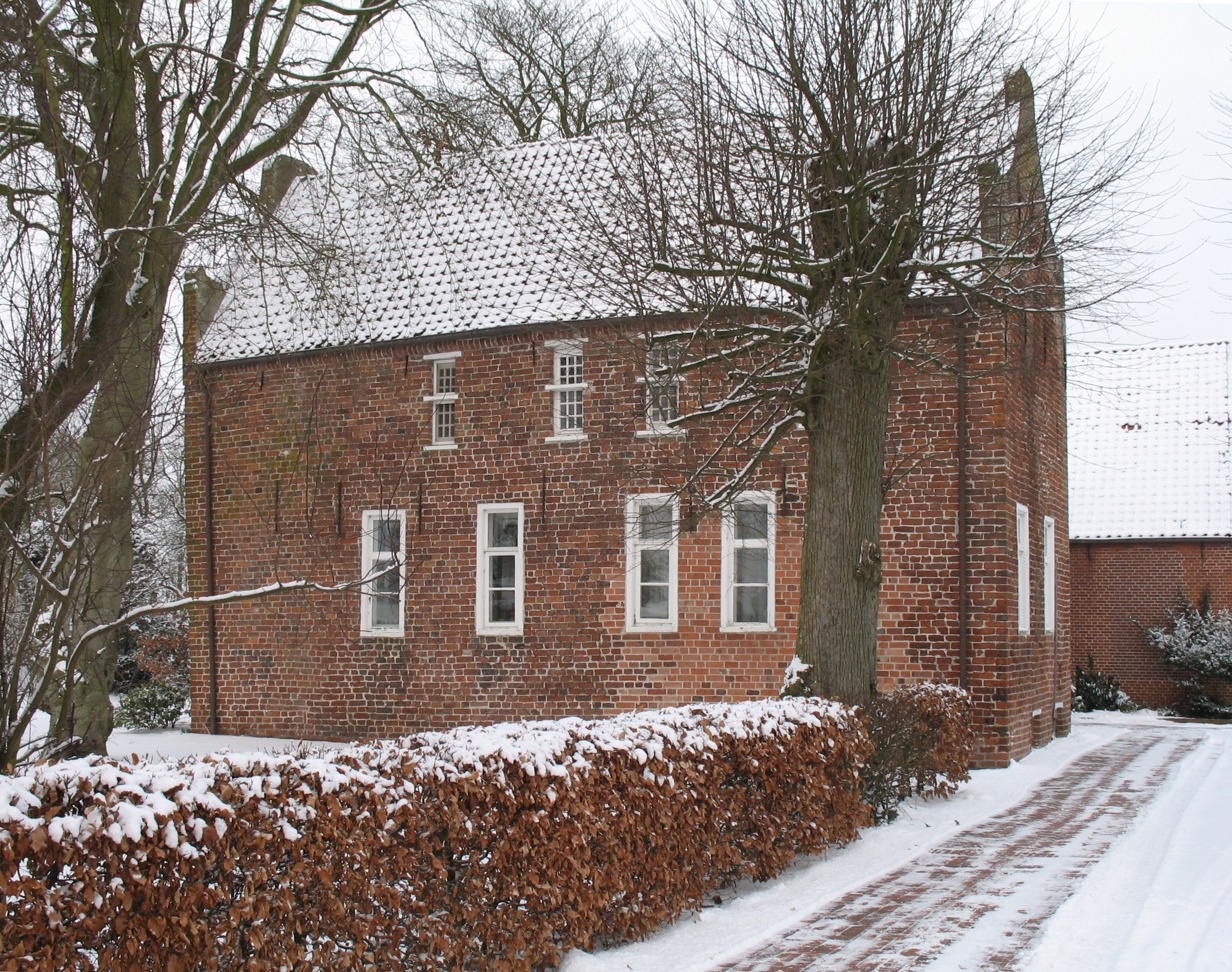
Rectory

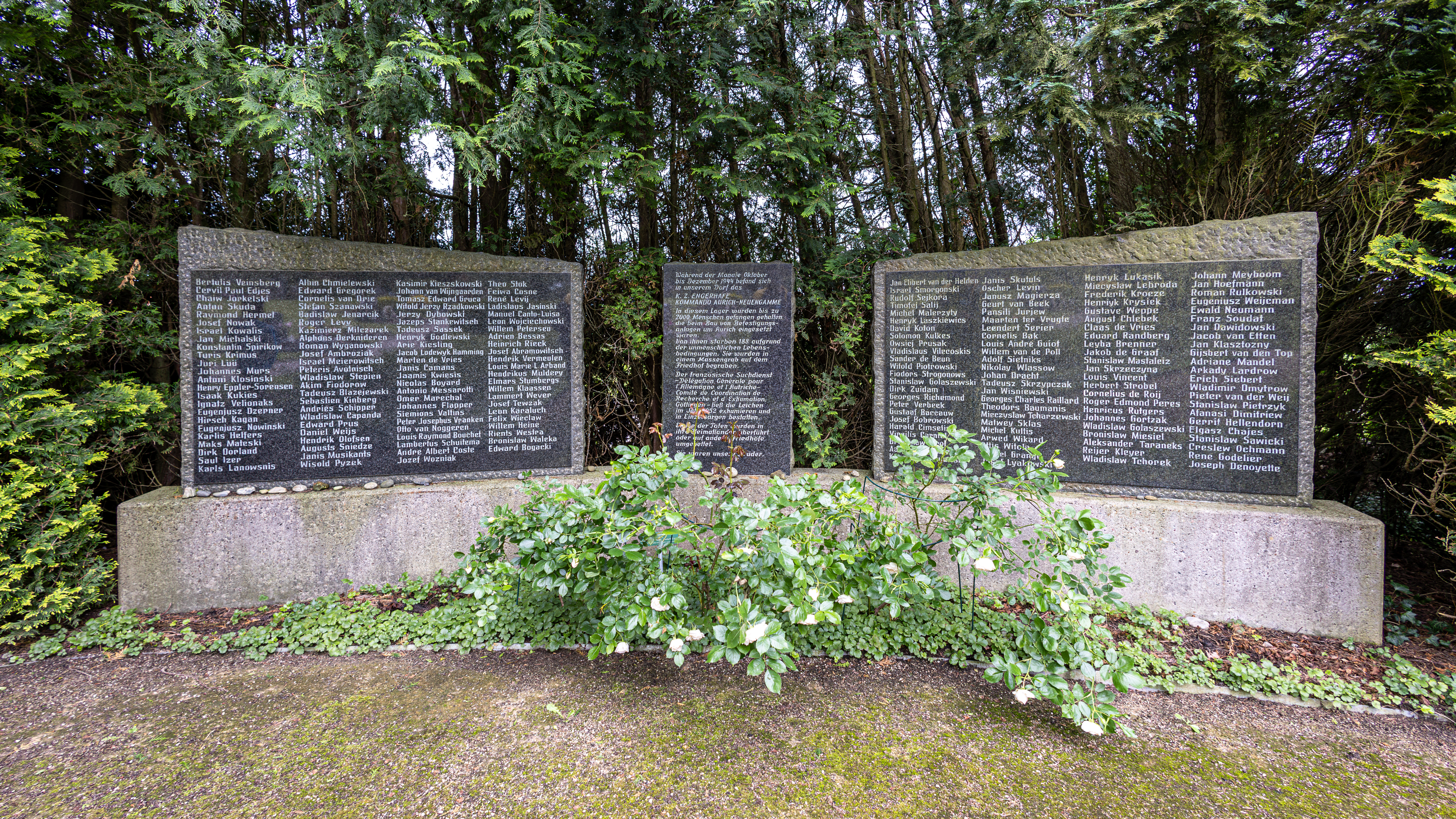
Memorial site Engerhafe concentration camp
