= Auricherland =

- Historic region

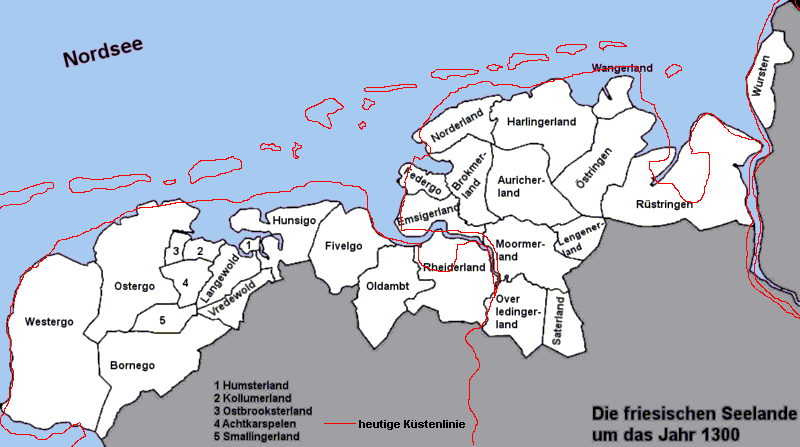
The Frisian coastal lands around 1300

The Auricherland was an historic region, in central East Frisia, which covered a large area around the town of Aurich in north Germany.

The Auricherland bordered in the west on the Brokmerland, in the north on the Norderland and the Harlingerland, in the east on Östringen and in the south on the Lengenerland and the Moormerland.
