= Oldeborg =

- Village of Südbrookmerland
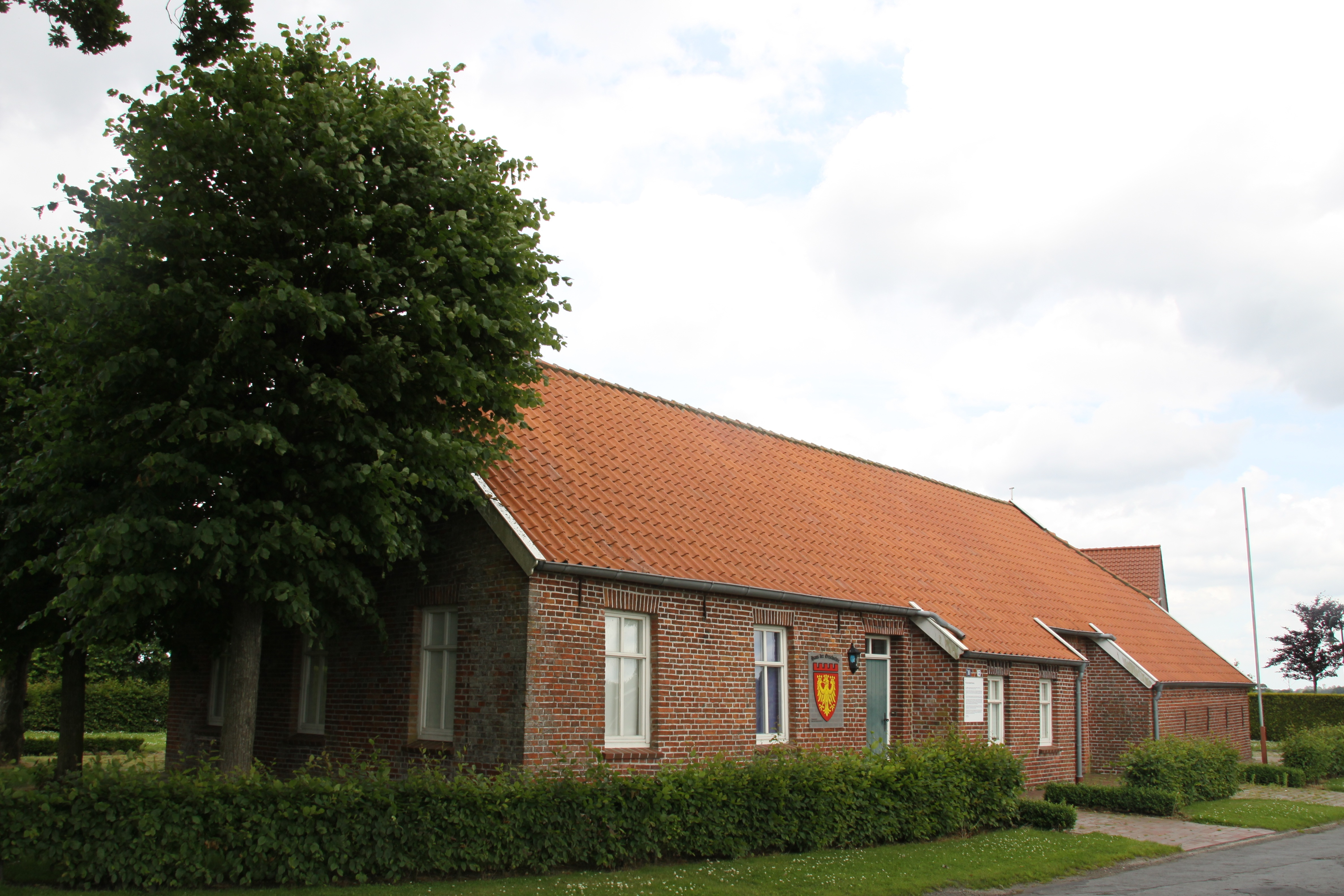
- House in Oldeborg

- Coat of arms

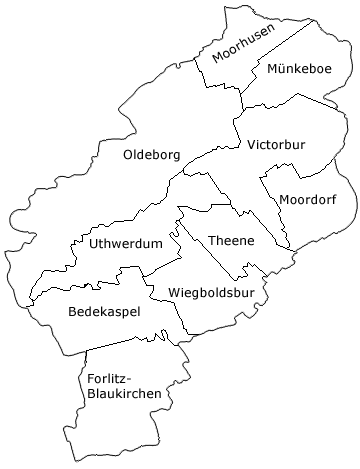
- Ortsteile of Südbrookmerland
- Interactive map of Oldeborg
- Location within Germany Location within Lower Saxony
- Coordinates: 53.49994°N 7.33113°E
- Country: Germany
- State: Lower Saxony
- District: Aurich
- Municipality: Südbrookmerland
- Elevation: 1 m (3.3 ft)

Population
  - Metro: 1,654
- Time zone: UTC+01:00 (CET)
  - Summer (DST): UTC+02:00 (CEST)
- Dialling codes: 04942
- Vehicle registration: 26624

Oldeborg is an East Frisian village in Lower Saxony, Germany. It is the largest Ortsteil by area of the municipality of Südbrookmerland, in the district of Aurich. A dispersed settlement, the Ortsteil includes four village cores: Engerhafe, Fehnhusen, Oldeborg, and Upende.

== History ==
Oldeborg is a former site of a castle belonging to the Tom Brok family of chiefs and was first mentioned in 1415 as Oldenborch. The current spelling has been in use since 1719. The name is composed of the Middle Low German olt or olde, "old", and borg, "castle".

As early as 1938, the formerly independent rural communities of Engerhafe, Fehnhusen, Oldeborg, and Upende were united to form the larger municipality of Oldeborg, which together covered roughly the area of the medieval parish of Engerhafe. As of 1 July 1972, this municipality merged with surrounding municipalities to form Südbrookmerland.
