= Norderland =

Coordinates: 53°35′48″N 07°12′20″E

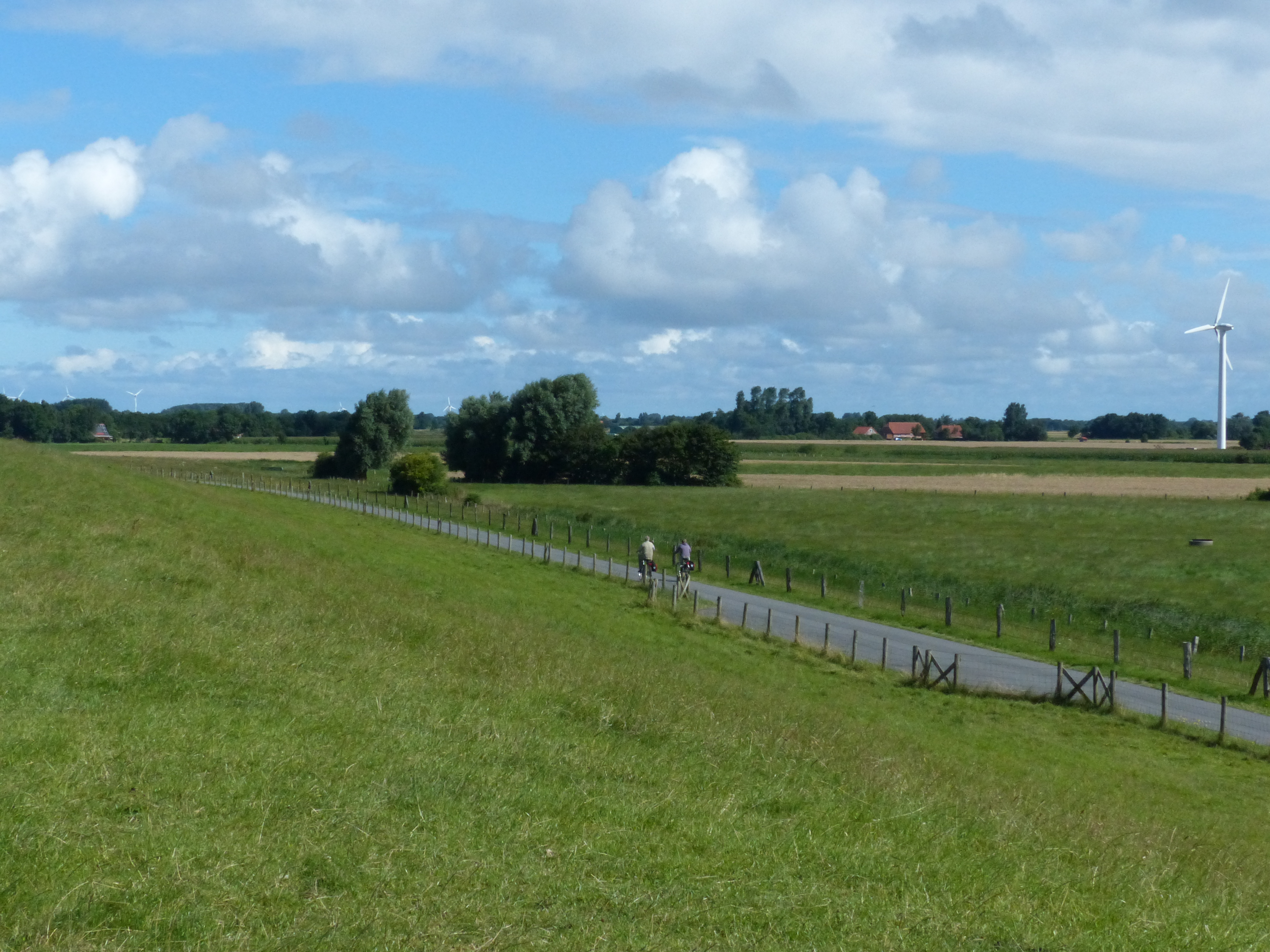
View from the dyke of the Leybucht looking east into Norderland

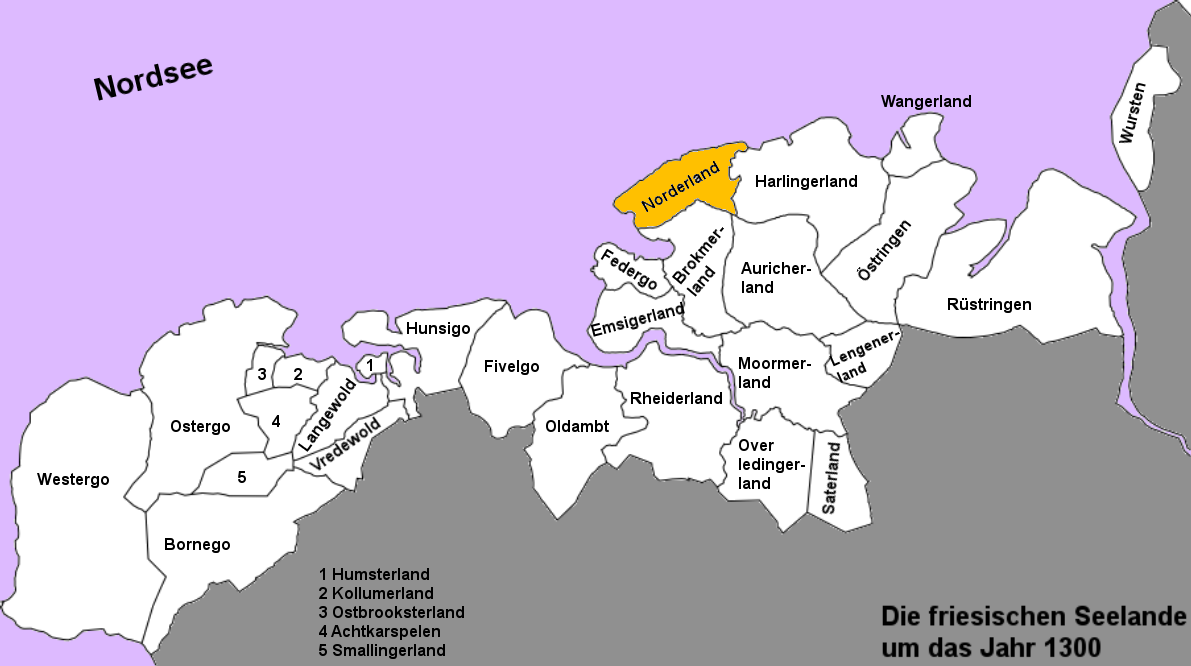
The Norderland around 1300

The Norderland was a historic territory located on the northwestern edge of East Frisia in North Germany, immediately adjacent to the Wadden Sea. It encompassed a wide area around the town of Norden. The Norderland was bordered in the east by the Harlingerland and in the south by the Brokmerland.

Today, Norderland refers to the area containing the borough of Norden, the collective municipality of Hage, Großheide and Dornum. Occasionally the term Norderland is also used to refer to the territory of the former district of Norden. Historically, however, this also included parts of Bro(o)kmerland and Emsigerland.
