= Uko Fockena =

- Born: c. 1408 possibly Oldersum
- Died: 13 June 1432 near Suurhusen
- Buried: Emden
- Spouse: Heba Attena
- Father: Focko Ukena
- Mother: Theda of Rheide

Uko Fockena (also known as: "Uko of Oldersum"; c. 1408 – 13 June 1432) was an East Frisian chieftain of Moormerland and Emsigerland.

== Life ==
Uko was one of the sons of the East Frisian chieftain Focko Ukena (born: around 1370; died: 29 August 1436) and his wife Theda of Rheide (born c. 1365; died: before 1411).

In 1424 Uko acquired together with Udo Poppinga the farm tor Brake (also spelled to Brahe / Brae) in the Emsland region from the Squire Ecerd von der Bele. His brother-in-law Ocko II tom Brok (Ocko to Broke), chief of the Brokmerland asked the abbot of Werden, in a letter dated 17 September 1424, to enfeoff Uko with this farm and confirmed that Uko was by birth a free man, honest and genuine, with four free-born grandparents.

Between 1425 and 1427 Uko married Heba Attena (1396-1449), a daughter of Lütet Attena of Dornum and Nesse and Ocka tom Brok, a daughter of Ocko I tom Brok. Documentary evidence exists that the heiress of this marriage was Theda Ukena (born: before 1432; died 17 September 1494), who married in 1455 Ulrich I Cirksena who was stadtholder of East Frisia and became the first Count of East Frisia in 1464.

In 1424 Uko and his father opposed the tom Brok family of East Frisian chieftains, who had transferred the village and castle of Oldersum to them in 1413. Ocko II tom Brok demanded from Focko the return of the castle and won a court case to that effect in the city of Groningen dated 6 June 1426. Focko rejected this decision and defeated Ocko in the Battle of Detern on 27 September 1426 and in the Battle of the Wild Fields on 28 October 1427. Thus, Focko Ukena became a pioneer of the principle of Frisian freedom.

From the spoils of war Uko Fockena kept the Lordship of Oldersum, including the parishes of Gandersum, Rorichum, Tergast and Simonswolde. In 1428, Uko Fockena styled himself Häuptling zu Oldersum (chieftain at Oldersum). The Oldersumer Chronik reports that he strengthened the castle at Oldersum using 80000stones obtained by demolishing Focken Castle in Borssum.

In 1430, Uko was besieged in his Oldersum castle by a group of Frisian chieftains who had joined forces under the leadership of the Cirksena family and who opposed Ukena's Lordship. On 2 November 1430, Uko gave up his claim, in a treaty with the besiegers. He was able, however, to retain the right to live in the castle, based on a legal claim his wife held as granddaughter of Ocko I tom Brok. Uko lived in the castle until his death in 1432.

His father had fled to Münster after his castle at Leer had fallen. Father Focko had not given up the power struggle and he invited his son Uko to Groothusen to meet his ally Imel Allena. On the way to there, Uko was attacked and slain in a reed land between Marienwehr und Suurhusen. He was buried in the church of the Franciscan monastery in Emden. His daughter Theda Ukena ordered an effigy tomb stone to be put on his grave. The church and the monastery were destroyed by a fire on 21 July 1938.

== References and sources ==
- Ernst Friedländer: Ostfriesisches Urkundenbuch, vol. 1, Emden, 1878: Nr.320, 324–326, 335, 338, 339, 349, 362, 365, 371, 376, 384, 389, 499, 774, 804.
- Hajo van Lengen: Bauernfreiheit und Häuptlingsherrschaft, in: Karl-Ernst Behre, Hajo van Lengen: Ostfriesland. Geschichte und Gestalt einer Kulturlandschaft, Aurich, 1995. p. 113–134.
