= Terborg, Germany =

Terborg
- Village of Moormerland
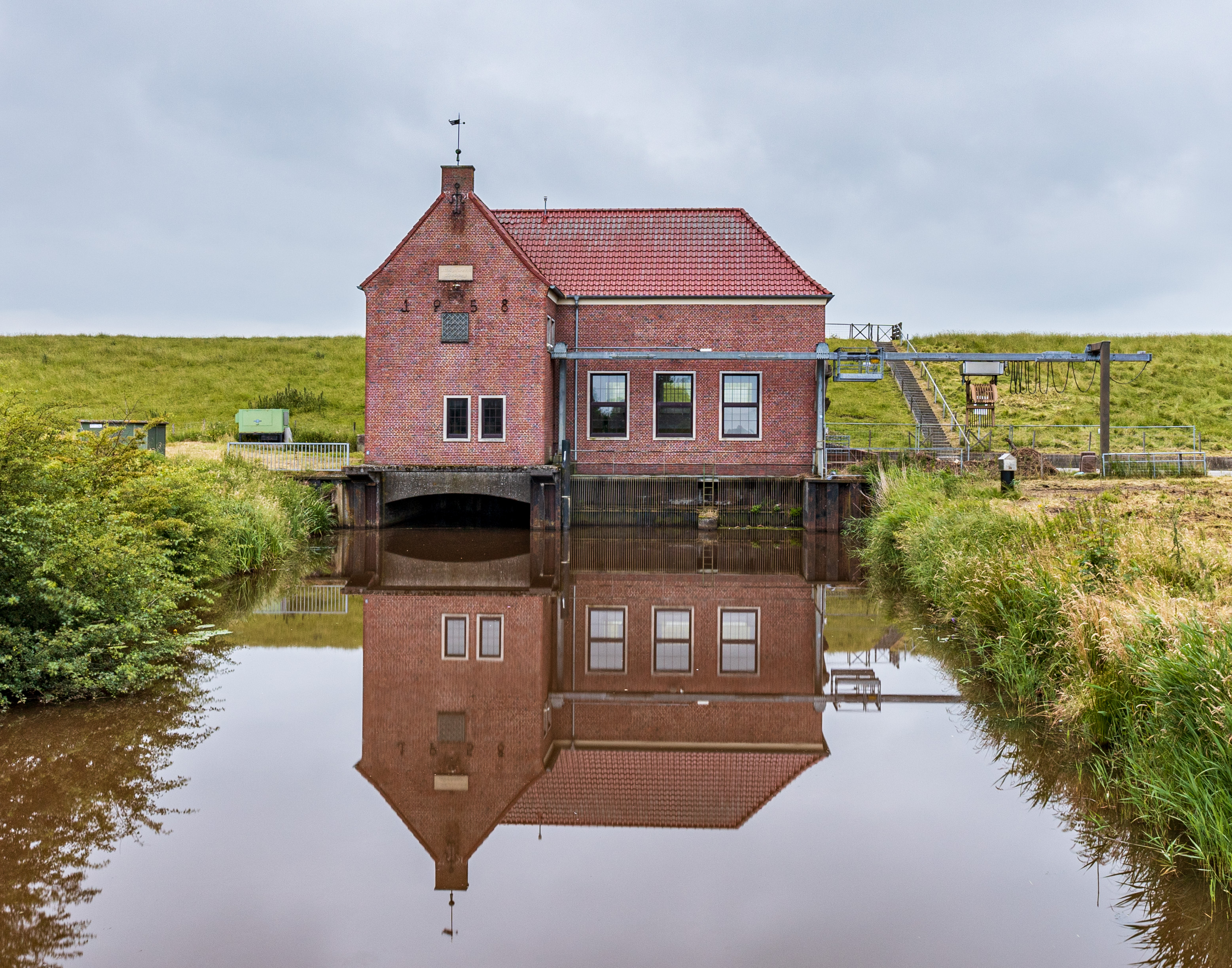
- Pumping station near Terborg
- Interactive map of Terborg
- Location within Germany Location within Lower Saxony
- Country: Germany
- State: Lower Saxony
- District: Leer
- Municipality: Moormerland

Area
  - Village of Moormerland: 5.45 km^{2} (2.10 sq mi)
- Elevation: 1 m (3.3 ft)

Population
  - Metro: 105
- Time zone: UTC+01:00 (CET)
  - Summer (DST): UTC+02:00 (CEST)
- Postal codes: 26802
- Dialling codes: 04954

Terborg is a small village in the region of East Frisia, in Lower Saxony, Germany. Administratively, it is an Ortsteil of the municipality of Moormerland. Located on the north bank of the river Ems, Terborg is approximately 8 kilometers to the northwest of Leer. It has a population of 105.

== Etymology ==
Terborg was first mentioned as Burchum in 1357. In 1564 it was mentioned as Neyeborg on a topographic map. Other early names are Torborch (1684), Ter-Borg (1735) and Terborg and Ferstenborg (1787). Three explanations are possible for the interpretation of the place name. For example, with the prefix ter-, the preposition and the article to der (East Frisian Low Saxon: zu der) could have merged to form ter-. According to Petra Spekker, the syllable -borg could mean not only "castle" but also "place of refuge" on the Ems. Ubbo Emmius, however, interpreted the name as "tri borgi", as "three castles", because in the Middle Ages the castles Terborg, Mittelsterborg, and Woltersterborg were lined up in Terborg on the Kleiweg from Oldersum to Neermoor. Petra Spekker does not consider this explanation to be unlikely, as Terborg was also referred to as Ferstenborg, which means "foremost castle".

== History ==
Terborg probably arose around 1000 AD as a farming and fishing village on a warft on the Ems. In contrast to its neighboring villages Oldersum and Neermoor, Terborg never developed into an important place. In the Middle Ages, the place initially belonged to the Emsgau, later to the Moormerland under the rule of the Cirksena to the Leerort district, after its dissolution in 1817 to the Leer district, from which the Leer district emerged in 1885.

== Gallery ==
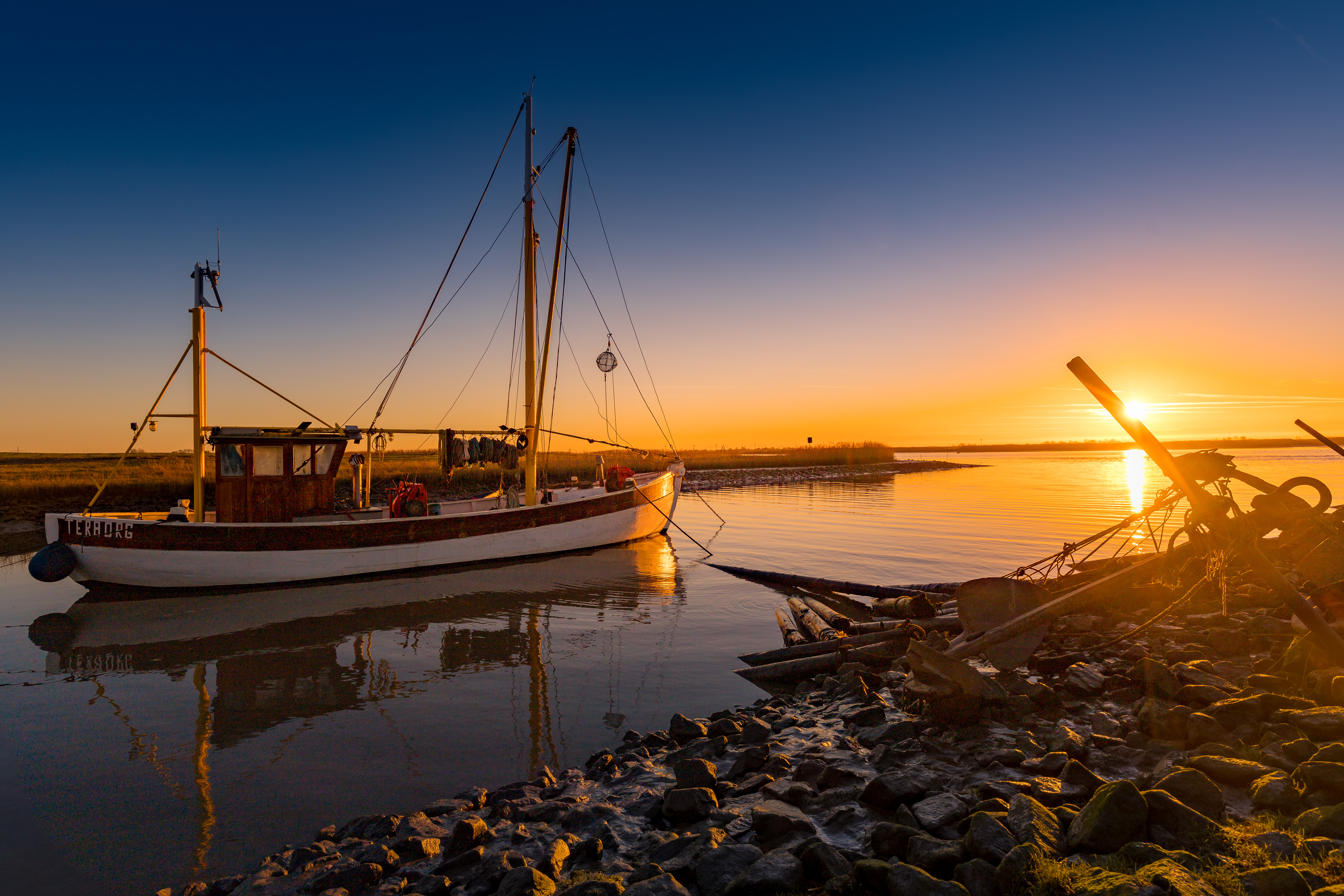
Diana Terborg

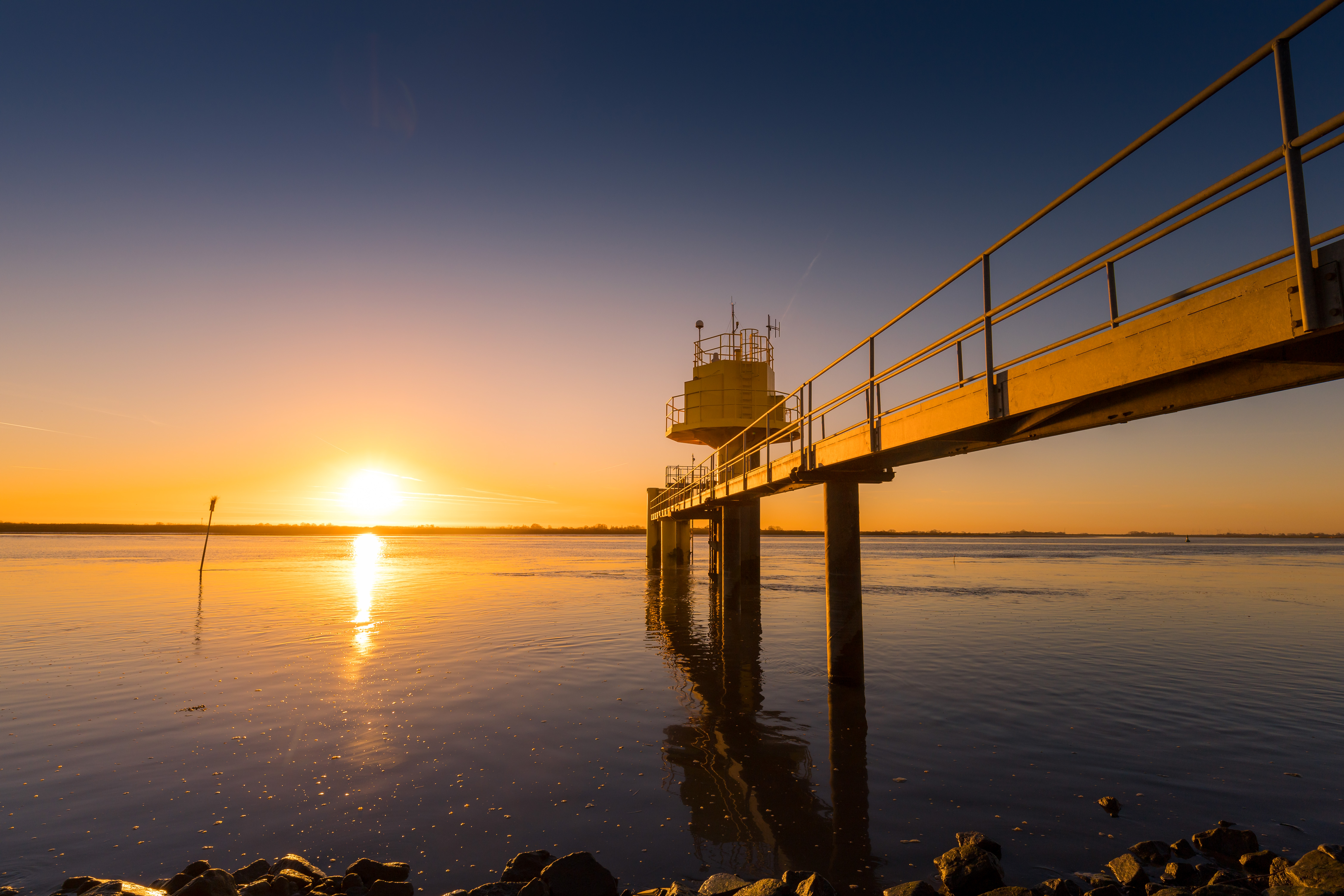
Stream gauge

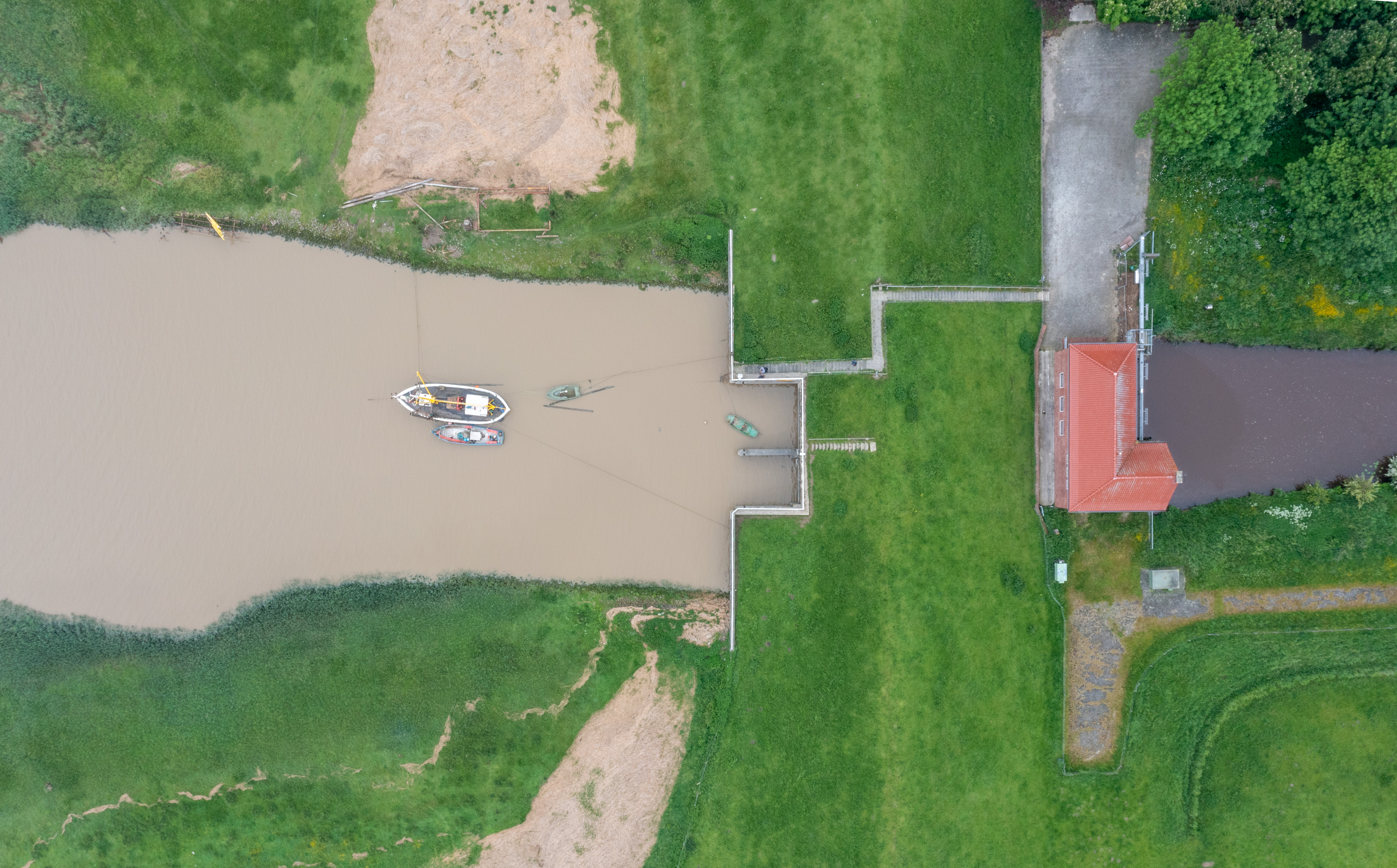
Aerial view of the pumping station
