= Jheringsfehn =

- Village of Moormerland
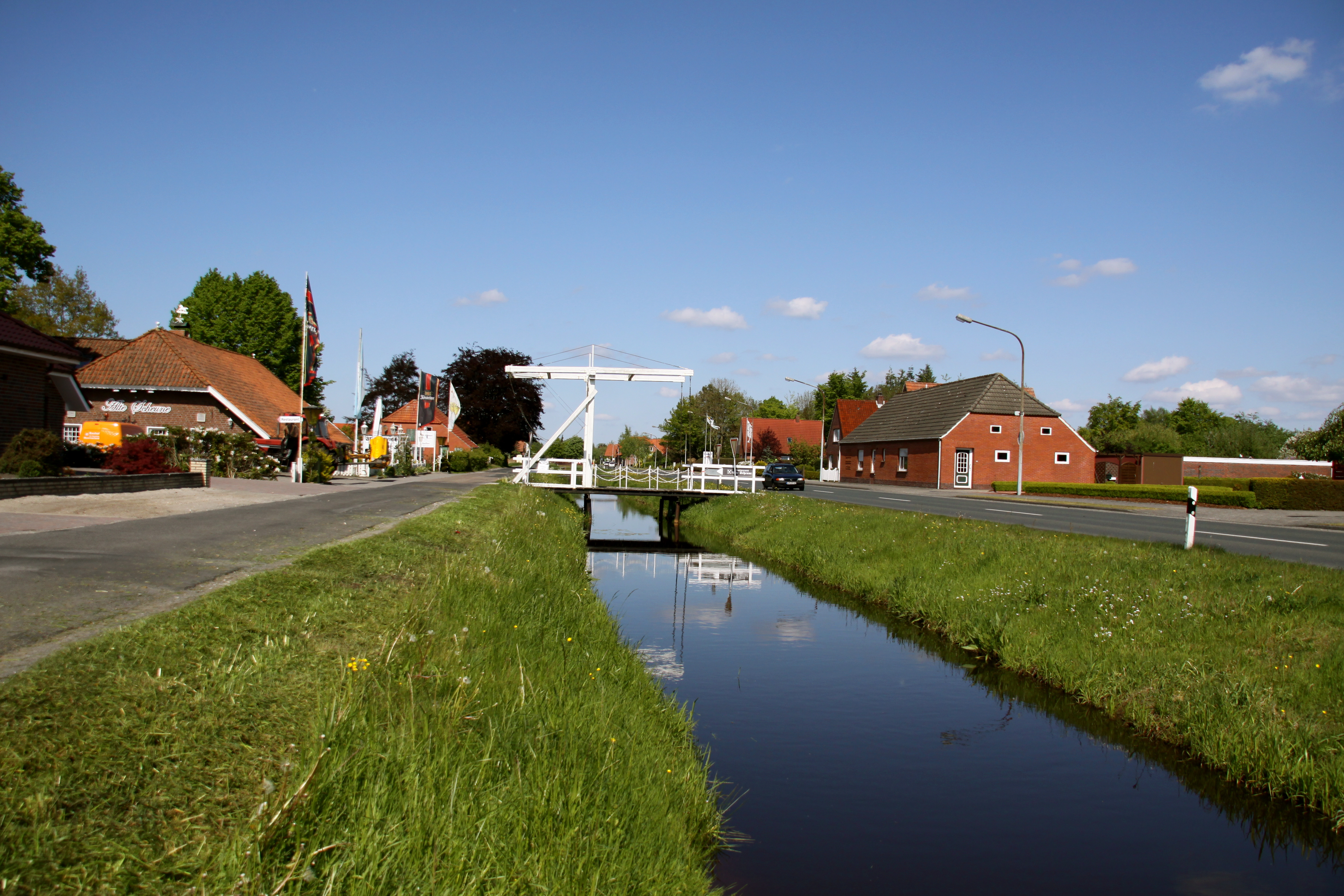
- Double-beam drawbridge in Jheringsfehn
- Interactive map of Jheringsfehn
- Location within Germany Location within Lower Saxony
- Country: Germany
- State: Lower Saxony
- District: Leer
- Municipality: Moormerland

Area
  - Village of Moormerland: 10.55 km^{2} (4.07 sq mi)
- Elevation: 2 m (6.6 ft)

Population
  - Metro: 2,440
- Time zone: UTC+01:00 (CET)
  - Summer (DST): UTC+02:00 (CEST)
- Postal codes: 26802
- Dialling codes: 04954

Jheringsfehn (frequently misspelt Iheringsfehn) is a peat village in the region of East Frisia, in Lower Saxony, Germany. Administratively, it is an Ortsteil of the municipality of Moormerland. Warsingsfehn is located just to the east of Warsingsfehn and is approximately 10 kilometers to the northeast of Leer. It has a population of 2,440.

The village was named in 1754 after Sebastian Eberhard Jhering, great-grandfather of Rudolf von Jhering. The village still has its classic peat canals. Important elements of village life are the local sports club and the Lutheran church, which also covers the neighbouring village of Boekzetelerfehn. The village church stands on the boundary between the two villages.
