= Hatshausen =

- Village of Moormerland
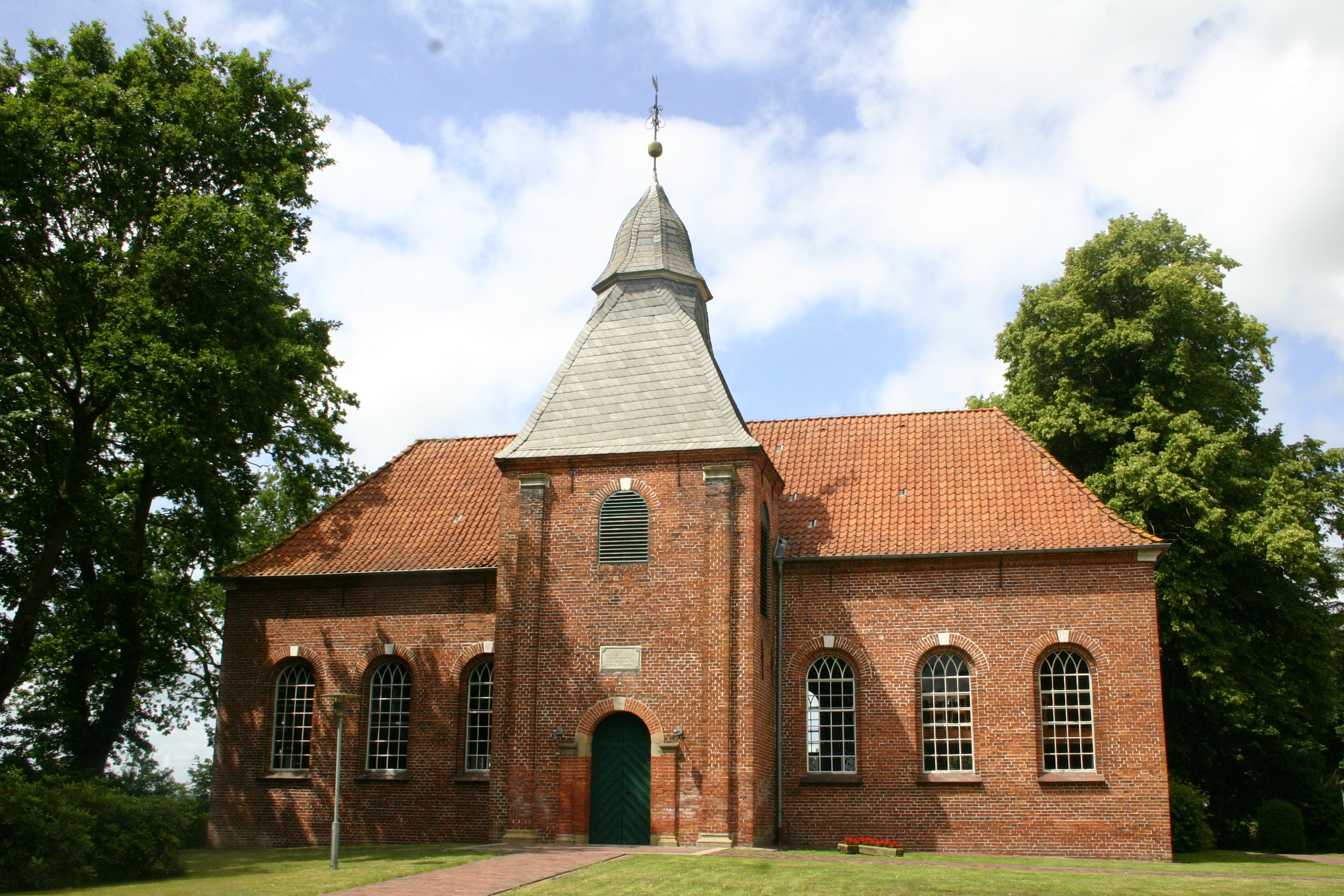
- Mary Magdalene Church
- Interactive map of Hatshausen
- Location within Germany Location within Lower Saxony
- Country: Germany
- State: Lower Saxony
- District: Leer
- Municipality: Moormerland

Area
  - Village of Moormerland: 18.82 km^{2} (7.27 sq mi)
- Elevation: 0 m (0 ft)

Population
  - Metro: 602
- Time zone: UTC+01:00 (CET)
  - Summer (DST): UTC+02:00 (CEST)
- Postal codes: 26802
- Dialling codes: 04954

Hatshausen is a village in the region of East Frisia, in Lower Saxony, Germany. Administratively, it is an Ortsteil of the municipality of Moormerland. Hatshausen is located to the northeast of Warsingsfehn and Boekzetelerfehn, and is approximately 13 kilometers to the northeast of Leer. It has a population of 602.

The nearby settlements of Ayenwolde, Büschersfehn, and Königshoek are administratively part of the village. The village's parish church, the Mary Magdalene Church, dates from 1783 and was built axially on the border with Ayenwolde.

== History ==
Hatshausen is first mentioned in the Münster parish register of the 15th century as Harstahusum.

Around 1613, the preacher Johannes Fabricius worked as a pastor in the community. He is considered the discoverer of sunspots and wrote a Latin work about them, De macullis in sole observatis, which he had printed in Wittenberg in 1611. A monument was erected to him and his father David Fabricius in Osteel in 1892.

The preacher Anton Christian Bolenius worked in the community from 1707 to 1716. He introduced moor burning and thus buckwheat cultivation to East Frisia.

The formerly independent municipality has formed the municipality of Moormerland together with ten other villages since the municipal reform that came into force on January 1, 1973.
