= Habbo (disambiguation) =

Habbo is a social networking hotel game site.

Habbo may also refer to:

- Habbo, Morocco, a settlement
- Habbo Gerhard Lolling (1848–1894), German classical archaeologist
