= Oldersumer Sieltief =

Coordinates: 53°19′17″N 7°20′23″E

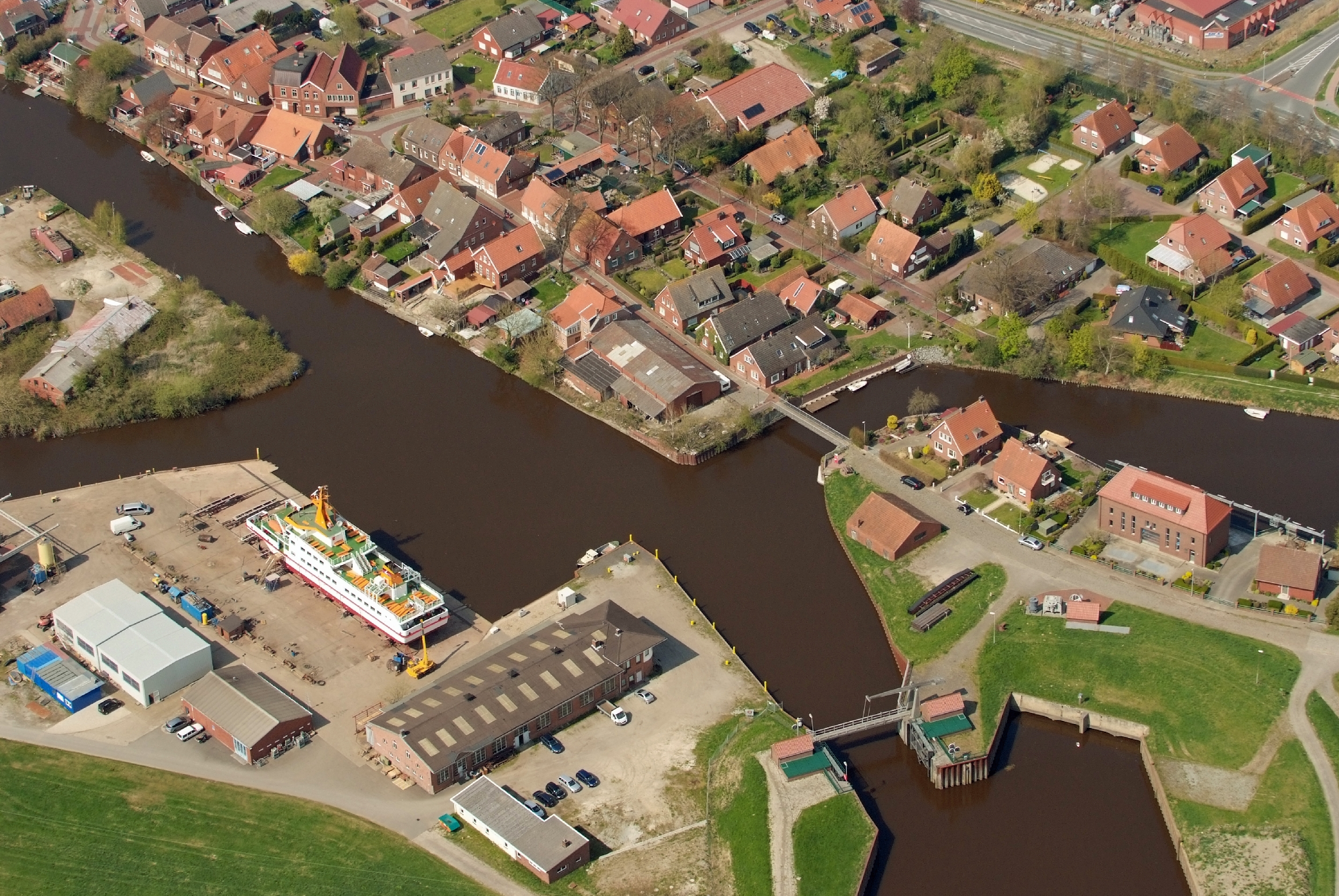
- Aerial view of Oldersum harbor with the Diedrich shipyard (not Bültjer) (Luftbild des Oldersumer Hafens mit der Schiffswerft Diedrich (nicht Bültjer))

Details
- Location: Leer district of East Frisia
- Length: 26.6 km

Oldersumer Sieltief (also known as Oldersumer Tief or Großes Tief) is a slow-moving waterway in the municipality of Moormerland in the Leer district of East Frisia, in the German state of Lower Saxony. It takes its name from the village of Oldersum, where it flows into the Ems via a sluice and pumping station.

== Course and tributaries ==
The Oldersumer Sieltief branches off from the Fehntjer Tief north of Oldersum, near the Groß Mönnikeborgum farmstead, and flows south towards Oldersum. North of the village, the canal makes a wide bend, almost reversing its general north-south flow direction for a short stretch. As it flows through the center of Oldersum, it receives a branch canal from the west, connecting to the Ems-Seitenkanal (Ems Lateral Canal) , and from the east, the Rorichumer Tief, which drains large parts of the Moormerland region via the Oldersumer Sieltief.

== History ==
Originally, the Oldersumer Sieltief was the natural lower course of a watercourse located in the moor and geest region on the border between the (present-day) city of Aurich and the municipality of Großefehn. From there, the Geestbach Flumm flowed southwest and emptied into the Ems River near Oldersum. However, in 1633, during the development of Westgroßefehn by Emden citizens, the drainage and traffic situation in the area was altered by the construction of the Fehntjer Tief between the city and the Groß Mönnikeborgum farm. Since then, the watercourse between Westgroßefehn and Emden has been called the Fehntjer Tief. Flumm remained the name for the natural course of the Geestbach northeast of Westgroßefehn, and the branch from the Groß Mönnikeborgum farm to Oldersum has since been called the Oldersumer Sieltief.

For centuries, the natural waterways and drainage canals that crisscross the area around Emden in a dense network were the most important means of transport. Ditches and canals connected not only the villages but also many farmsteads to the city of Emden and the port town of Oldersum. The latter was also often the home port for those ships owned by peatland proprietors that were too large for the narrow peatland canals and instead operated in coastal shipping. Boat traffic with Emden was particularly important. Village boatmen supplied the villages with goods from the city and delivered agricultural products in the opposite direction: "From the sluice port, smaller ships, so-called 'Loog ships,' transported the transshipped cargo inland and supplied the marsh villages ('loog' = village). Until the 20th century, the Loog ships from the Krummhörn region enlivened the canals of the city of Emden."

== Drainage ==
The Oldersumer Sieltief, along with the Petkumer Sieltief and the Sauteler Canal, is one of the main drainage channels for large parts of central East Frisia, except for the Aurich Geest. Together with its tributaries, it drains parts of the municipalities of Aurich, Ihlow, Großefehn, and Moormerland. The Oldersum Drainage Association, headquartered in Oldersum, is responsible for the maintenance of the Sieltief and its tributaries and also operates a sluice and pumping station there. Parts of the association's area lie below mean sea level, so without adequate drainage, these areas would be flooded during prolonged periods of heavy rainfall.
