= Robin E. Haak =

Tech Entrepreneur and Investor

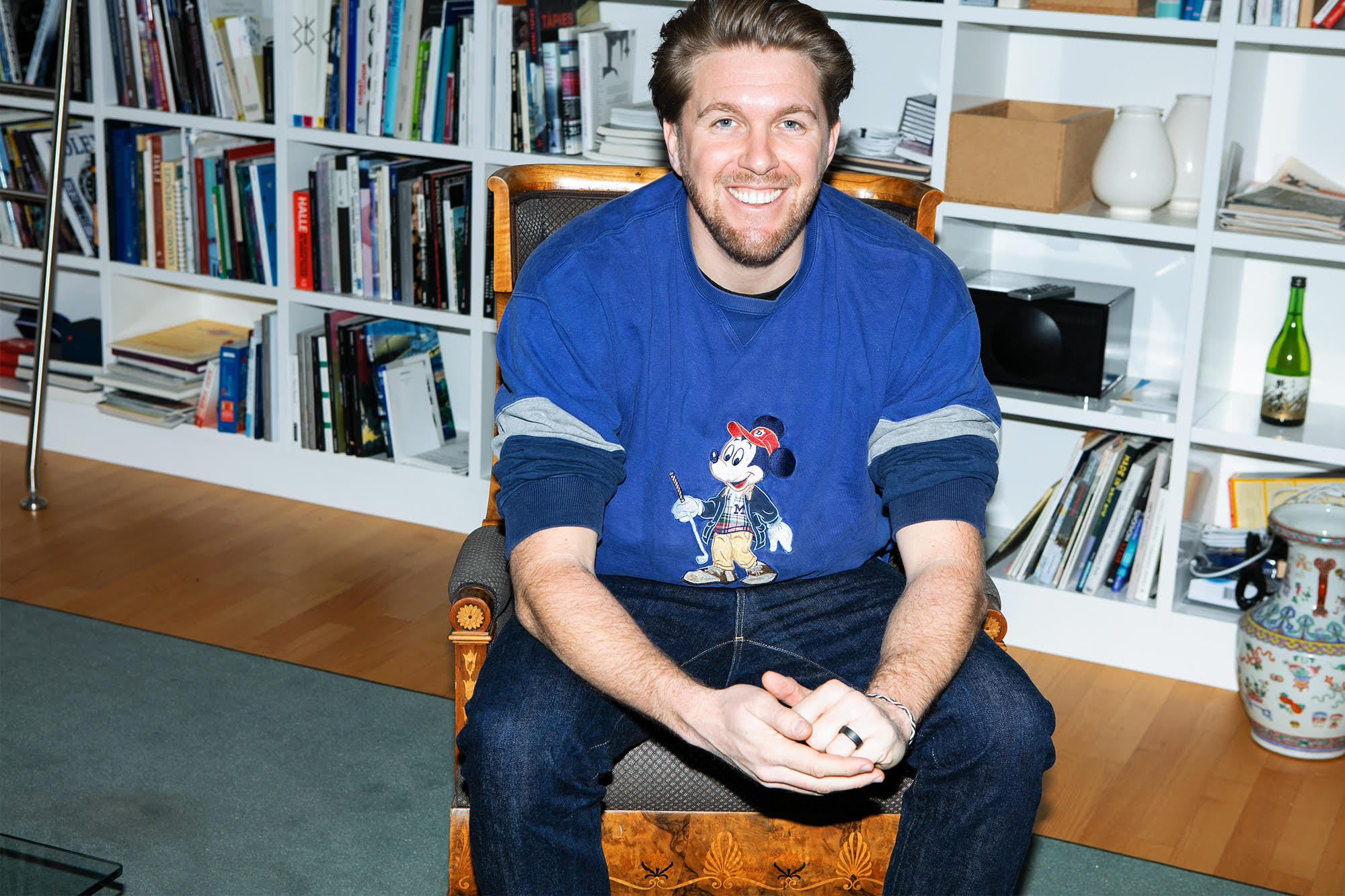
- Born: Robin Eric Haak; 1986 (age 39–40); Hannover, West Germany
- Education: University of Hamburg
- Occupation: Political scientist
- Known for: COO of SmartRecruiters
- Parent: Friedhelm Haak

Robin E. Haak (born. 1986) is a German political scientist, tech entrepreneur and investor from Hanover, Germany.

== Early life and career ==
Robin Eric Haak was born in Hanover, West Germany and was graduated from Gymnasium in Hanover. Haak studied political science, law and economics at the University of Salzburg. He later studied media management at Hamburg Media School, as well as University of Hamburg and graduated with an MBA degree. Haak started his career at Versace in New York. Later, he was employed by Axel Springer SE in Berlin. where he worked for the Axel Springer Digital Ventures, and co-founded the Axel Springer Plug and Play Accelerator. With this company, he acted as the first investor in the Fintech company N26.

After leaving Springer, Haak worked as a co-founder and managing director at Jobspotting GmbH; the company merged with Smartrecruiters Inc., where he became a shareholder as well as managing director; the company later reached unicorn status and was successfully acquired by the software company SAP for a total of US$850 million.

Haak holds a stake in the company Woman Inc. UG and founded the company as Chief Marketing Officer.

He is also shareholder and board member of other companies. He co-created and built up Revaia, a German and France based Growth Equity Fund, with an Environment Social Governance focus, and a crossover investment strategy (public and private investing), with a first fund size of 250 million €. As of today, Revaia manages approximately €600 million in assets under management (AuM) (as of July 2025).

January 2021, he joined the advisory board of Stepstone. Since 2021, he has worked as a harvester for Aubert de Villaine at his vineyard, Domaine de la Romanée-Conti. In 2023, he founded a Solo GP venture capital fund, Robin Capital, managing €15 million in committed capital.

== See also ==
- Axel Springer SE
- Mathias Döpfner
