= Colloquy of Oldersum =

1526 public debate in Lower Saxony, Germany

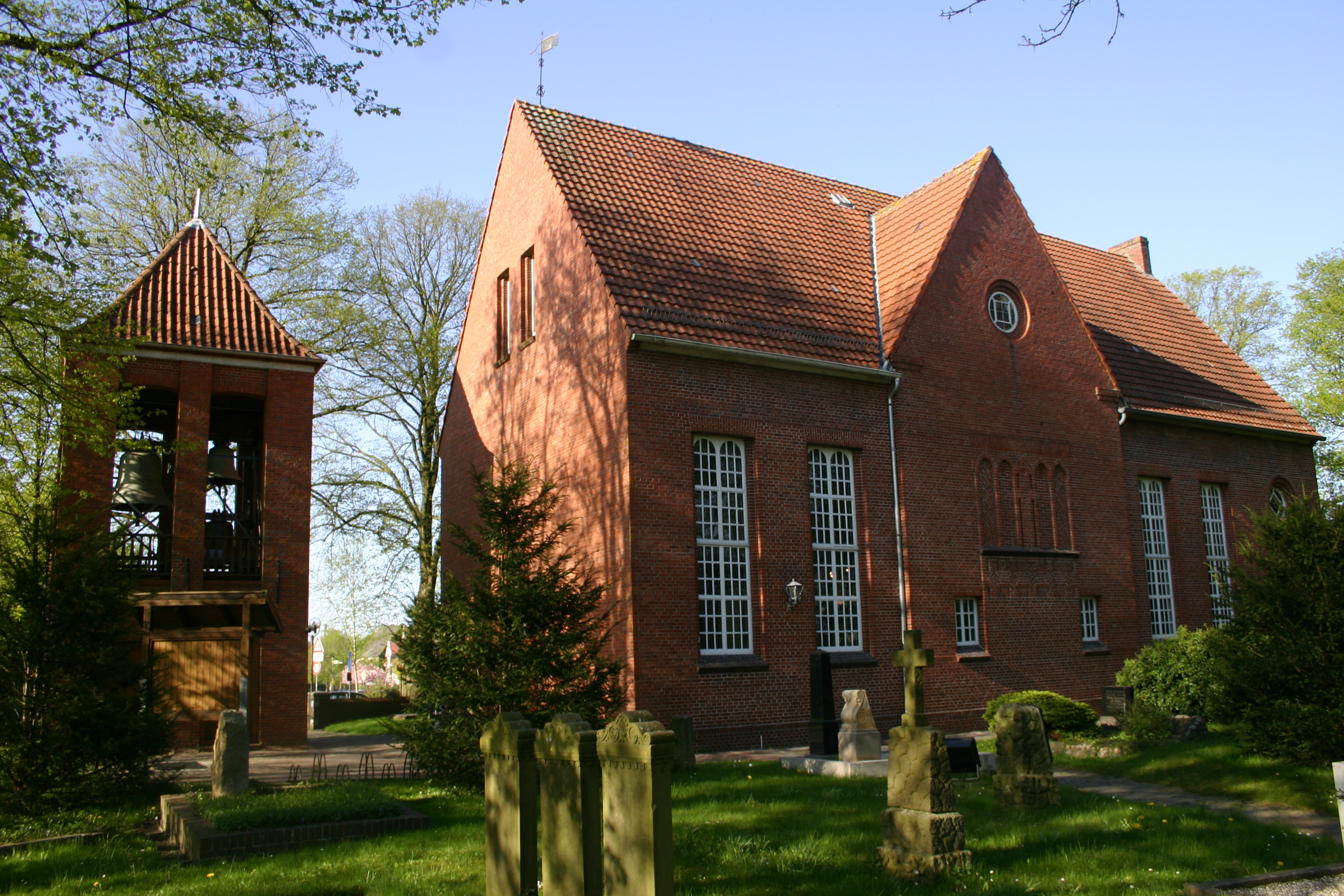
The Church of Oldersum; the location of the colloquy

The Colloquy of Oldersum was a public debate initiated by Ulrich von Dornum in June 1526 in Oldersum between the Emden preacher Georg Aportanus (Protestant-Lutheran) and the Catholic Dominican prior Laurens Laurensen. The document Ulrich subsequently wrote about the debate was widely distributed and thus contributed to the rapid establishment of Protestantism in East Frisia.

Only shortly after the reformer Martin Luther published his 95 theses in Wittenberg on October 31, 1517 in response to Johann Tetzel's indulgence sermon, the Protestant doctrine was accepted in East Frisia. As early as 1519, the Oldersum pastor Hinrich Arnoldi is said to have held services according to the Protestant confession, like Heinrich Brun in Aurich. Ulrich von Dornum was an ardent supporter of the Reformation. Ulrich, who had come into possession of half of the castle and lordship of Oldersum through marriage in 1494, initiated and organized the public debate between the preacher Georg Aportanus from Emden and the Catholic Dominican prior Laurens Laurensen from Groningen in June 1526. Ulrich wrote a paper about the debate, which was printed in Wittenberg.

Due to the influence of the Calvinists, especially John Calvin and Huldrych Zwingli, the vast majority of western East Frisia has since become Protestant-Reformed.

Oldersum was, alongside Emden, a center of the “East Frisian church reformers”. In 1529, Ulrich von Dornum hosted Andreas Karlstadt; after that, Menno Simons and other “Anabaptists” (Mennonites) were most likely guests there as well.
