= Tergast =

- Village of Moormerland
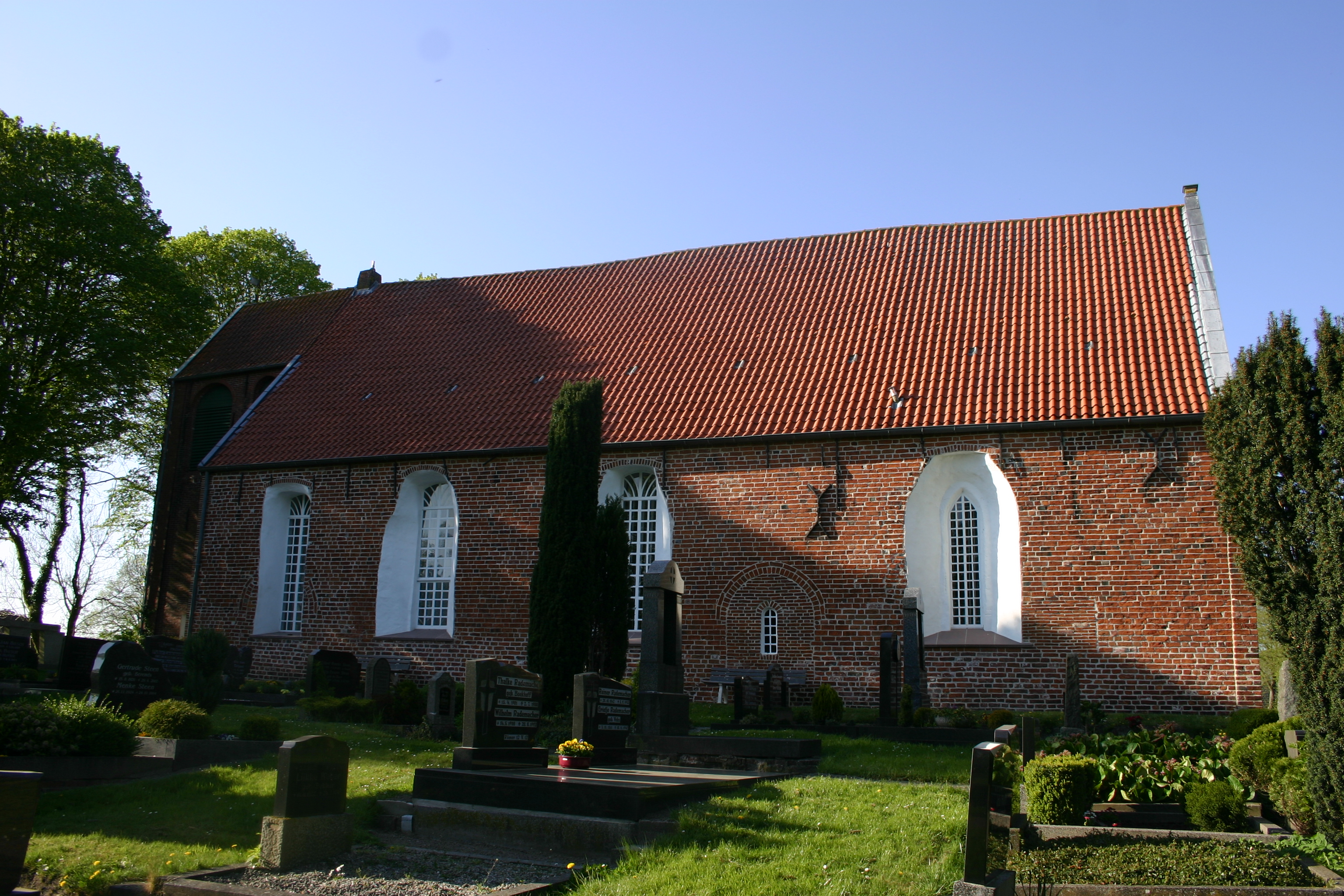
- Church of Tergast
- Interactive map of Tergast
- Location within Germany Location within Lower Saxony
- Country: Germany
- State: Lower Saxony
- District: Leer
- Municipality: Moormerland

Area
  - Village of Moormerland: 9.95 km^{2} (3.84 sq mi)
- Elevation: 4 m (13 ft)

Population
  - Metro: 457
- Time zone: UTC+01:00 (CET)
  - Summer (DST): UTC+02:00 (CEST)
- Postal codes: 26802
- Dialling codes: 04924

Tergast is a village in the region of East Frisia, in Lower Saxony, Germany. Administratively, it is an Ortsteil of the municipality of Moormerland. Tergast is 1.5 kilometers to the northeast of Oldersum and has a population of 457.

The first known mention of the village is as Gast in a deed of gift from the Langen monastery in 1401. Its current name could refer to the fact that the village is built on a high sand ridge, known as a geest. The Church of Tergast was built on the highest point of this ridge somewhere in the second half of the 13th century.

The Emden municipal waterworks with several reservoirs is located in Tergast.

== Notable people ==
- Habbo Gerhard Lolling (1848–1894), archaeologist
