= Fehntjer Tief =

River in Germany

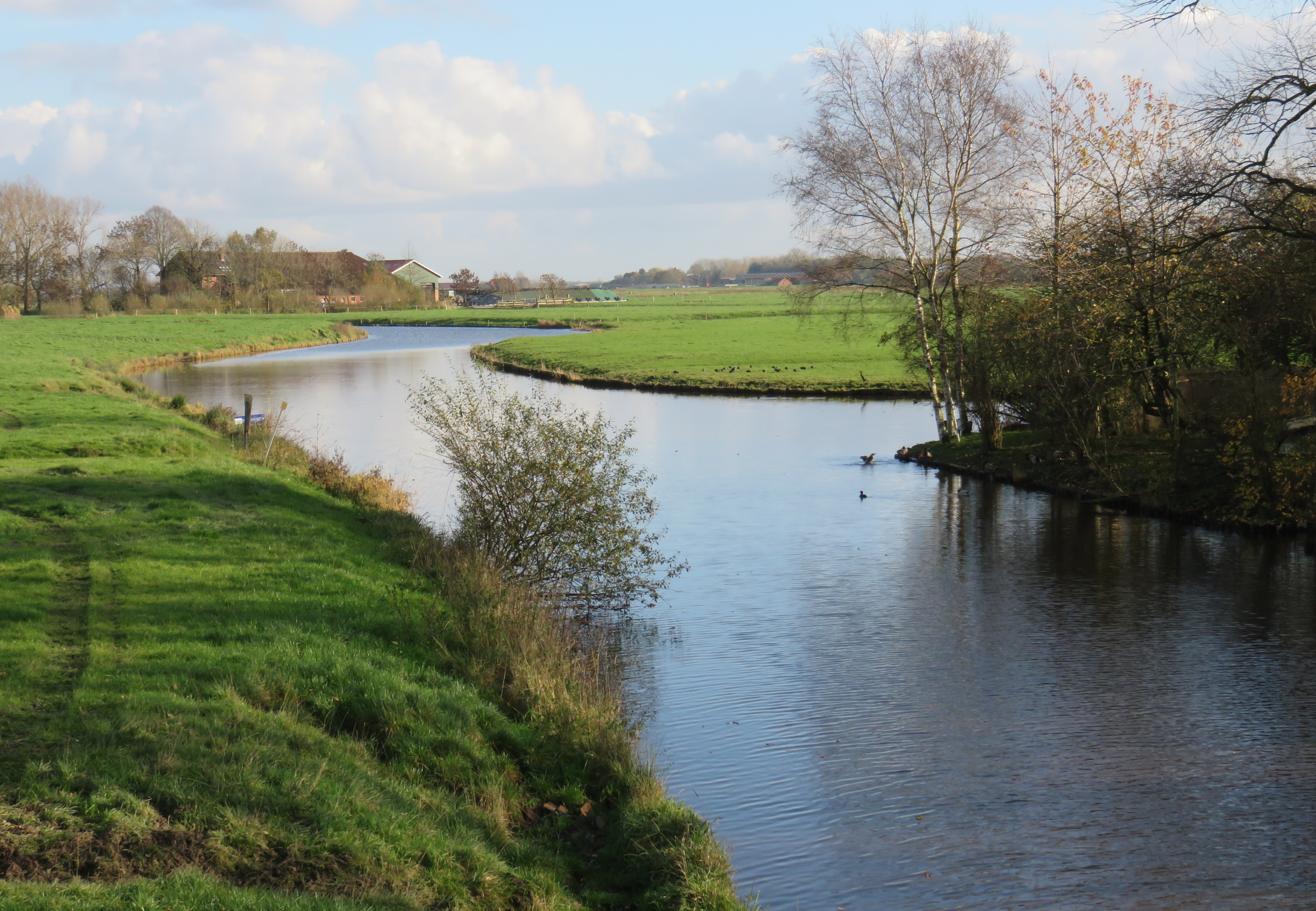
- Fehntjer Tief in East Frisia

Location
- Country: Germany
- State: Lower Saxony

Physical characteristics
- Mouth
  - location: Oldersumer Sieltief
  - coordinates: 53.3470°N 7.3442°E

Basin features
- Progression: Oldersumer Sieltief→ Ems→ North Sea

Fehntjer Tief is a river in East Frisia, Lower Saxony, Germany. It discharges into the Ems through the Oldersumer Sieltief near Emden.

== See also ==
- List of rivers of Lower Saxony
