= Veenhusen =

- Village of Moormerland
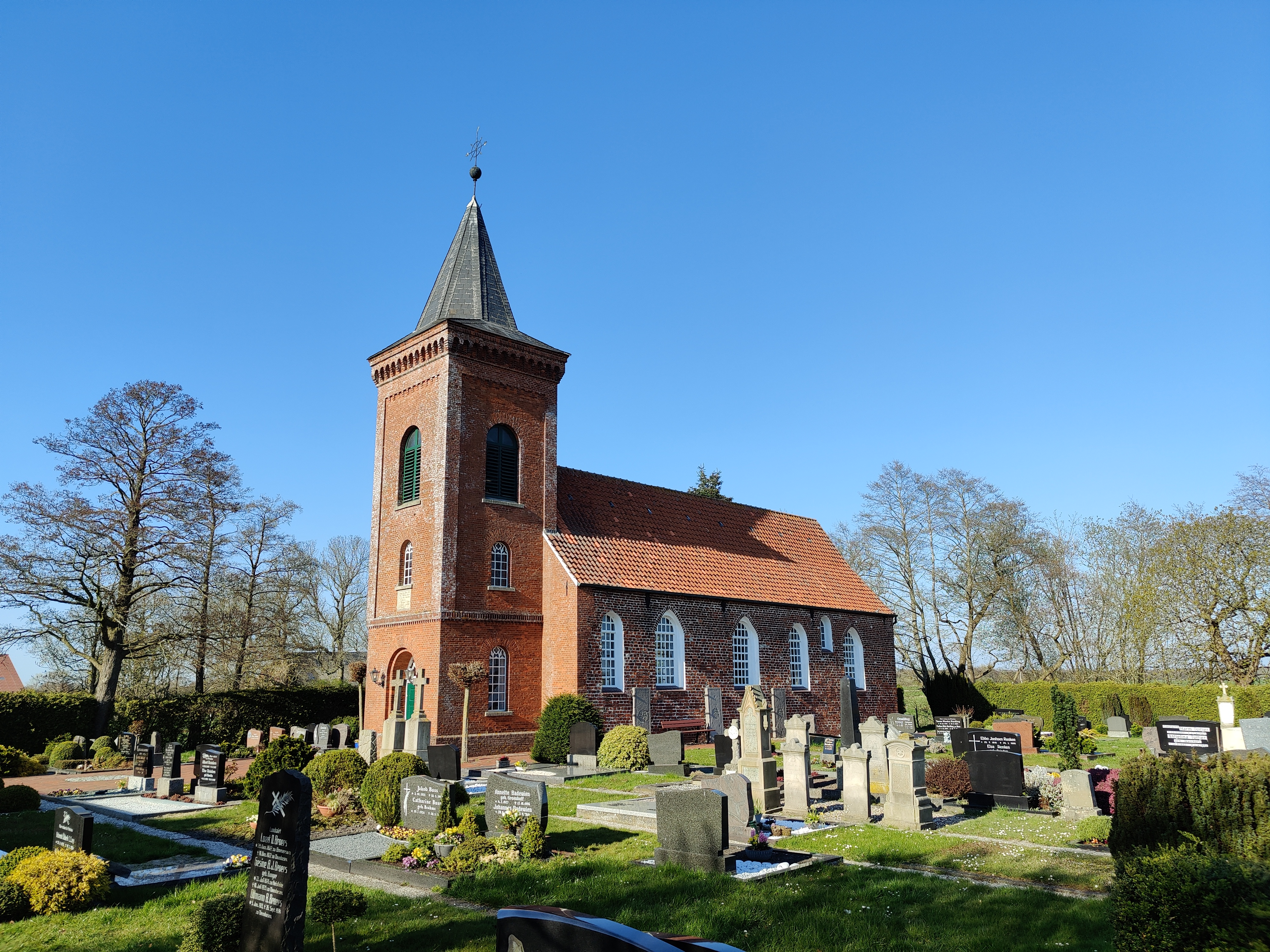
- Church of Veenhusen
- Interactive map of Veenhusen
- Location within Germany Location within Lower Saxony
- Country: Germany
- State: Lower Saxony
- District: Leer
- Municipality: Moormerland

Area
  - Village of Moormerland: 15.62 km^{2} (6.03 sq mi)

Population
  - Metro: 4,157
- Time zone: UTC+01:00 (CET)
  - Summer (DST): UTC+02:00 (CEST)
- Postal codes: 26802
- Dialling codes: 04954

Veenhusen is a village in the region of East Frisia, in Lower Saxony, Germany. Administratively, it is an Ortsteil of the municipality of Moormerland. Veenhusen is located just to the south of Warsingsfehn and is approximately 8 kilometers to the northeast of Leer. It has a population of 4,157.

The Church of Veenhusen dates from around 1400 and contains a church organ built by Johann Gottfried Rohlfs between 1801 and 1802. The church is said to have previously stood in Uphusen near Emden but was demolished there due to imminent danger from the changed course of the Ems. After the demolition, the church in Veenhusen would have been rebuilt.

The village flows seamlessly on the north side into the adjacent Warsingsfehn, the main town of Moormerland. Both of these villages were greatly expanded after the Second World War with residential areas for commuters who work in Emden or Leer.

Formerly an independent municipality, Veenhusen was fused with ten other villages during the municipal reform of 1 January 1973 to form Moormerland.
