= Rorichum =

- Village of Moormerland
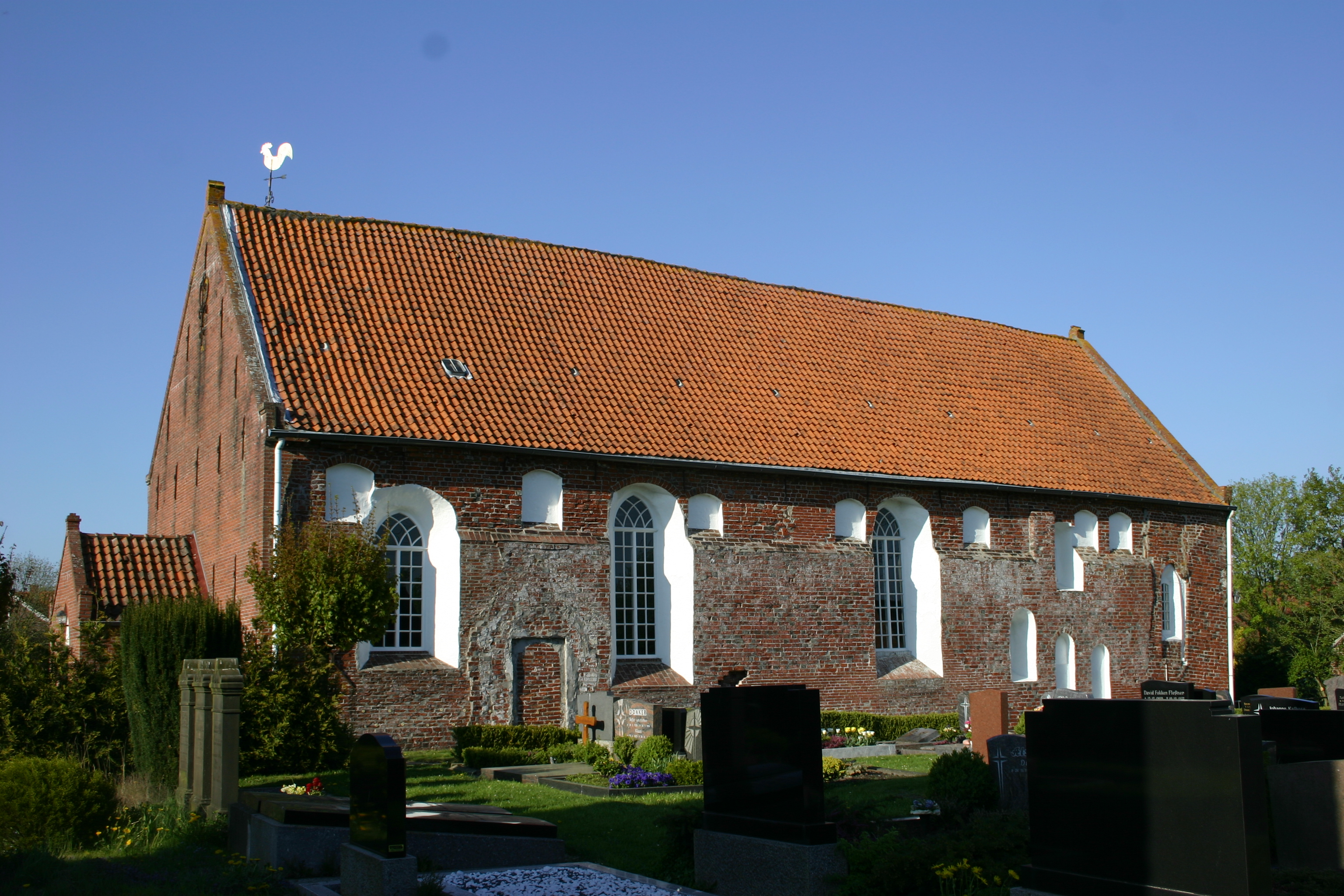
- Church of Rorichum
- Interactive map of Rorichum
- Location within Germany Location within Lower Saxony
- Country: Germany
- State: Lower Saxony
- District: Leer
- Municipality: Moormerland

Area
  - Village of Moormerland: 8.72 km^{2} (3.37 sq mi)
- Elevation: 1 m (3.3 ft)

Population
  - Metro: 444
- Time zone: UTC+01:00 (CET)
  - Summer (DST): UTC+02:00 (CEST)
- Postal codes: 26802
- Dialling codes: 04924

Rorichum is a village in the region of East Frisia, in Lower Saxony, Germany. Administratively, it is an Ortsteil of the municipality of Moormerland. Located on the north bank of the Ems estuary, Rorichum is just to the southeast of Oldersum. It has a population of 444.

Rorichum, perhaps a derivation of "Roderik's home", already appears as Rarughem in registers of the Werden Abbey from the beginning of the eleventh century. The center of the small warft village is the St. Nicholas Church with a free-standing bell tower from the fourteenth century.
