= Gandersum =

- Village of Moormerland
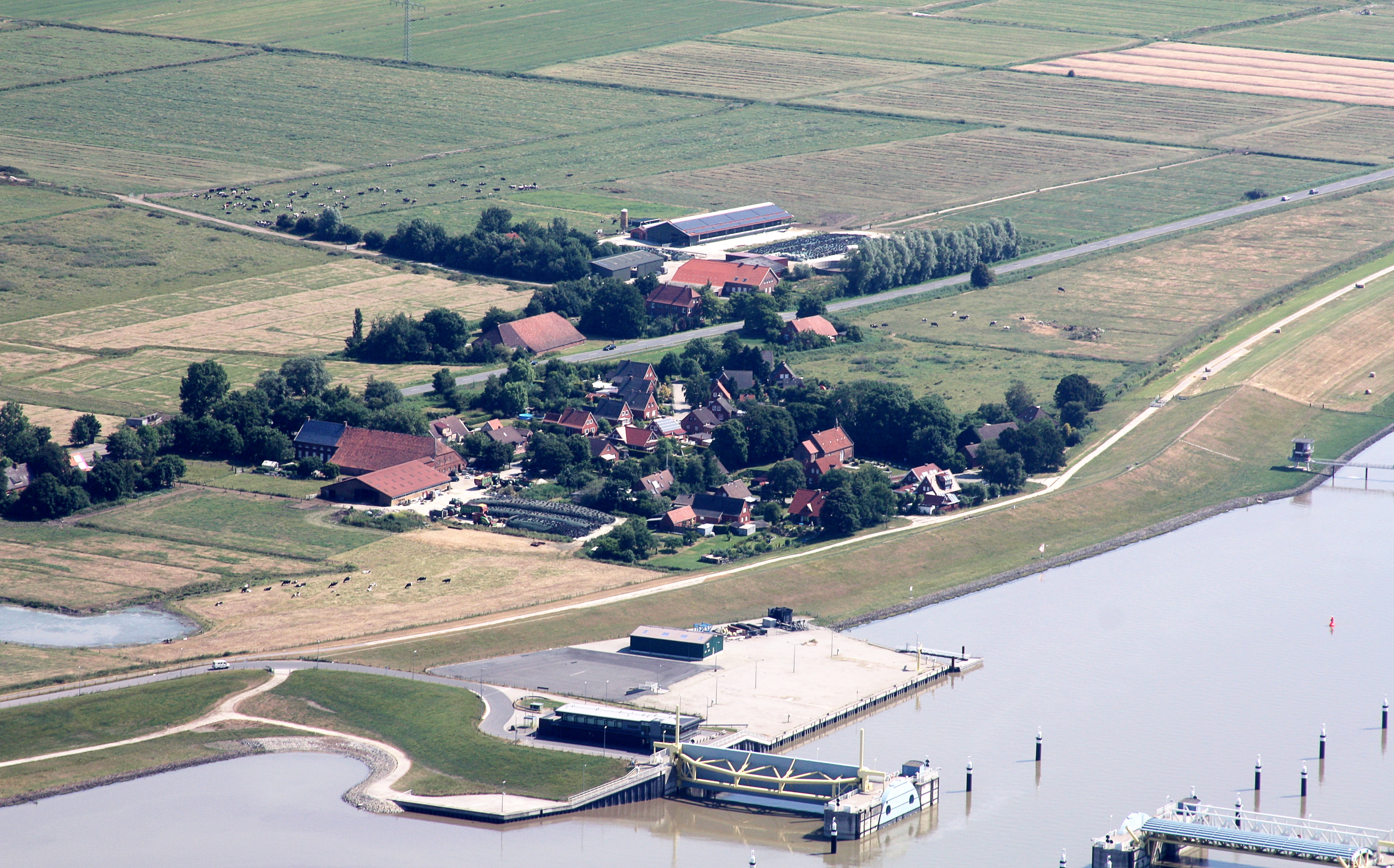
- Aerial view of Gandersum
- Interactive map of Gandersum
- Location within Germany Location within Lower Saxony
- Country: Germany
- State: Lower Saxony
- District: Leer
- Municipality: Moormerland

Area
  - Metro: 3.2 km^{2} (1.2 sq mi)
- Elevation: 1 m (3.3 ft)

Population
  - Metro: 85
- Time zone: UTC+01:00 (CET)
  - Summer (DST): UTC+02:00 (CEST)
- Postal codes: 26802
- Dialling codes: 04924

Gandersum is a small village in the region of East Frisia, in Lower Saxony, Germany. Administratively, it is an Ortsteil of the municipality of Moormerland. Located on the north bank of the Ems estuary, Gandersum is to the southeast of Emden and the west of Oldersum. It has a population of 85.

Gandersum was already mentioned in a list of possessions of the Werden Abbey from 930. Here, the village is mentioned as Gondrikeshem. The Church of Gandersum dates from the fourteenth century.
