= Habbo Gerhard Lolling =

German archaeologist (1848–1894)

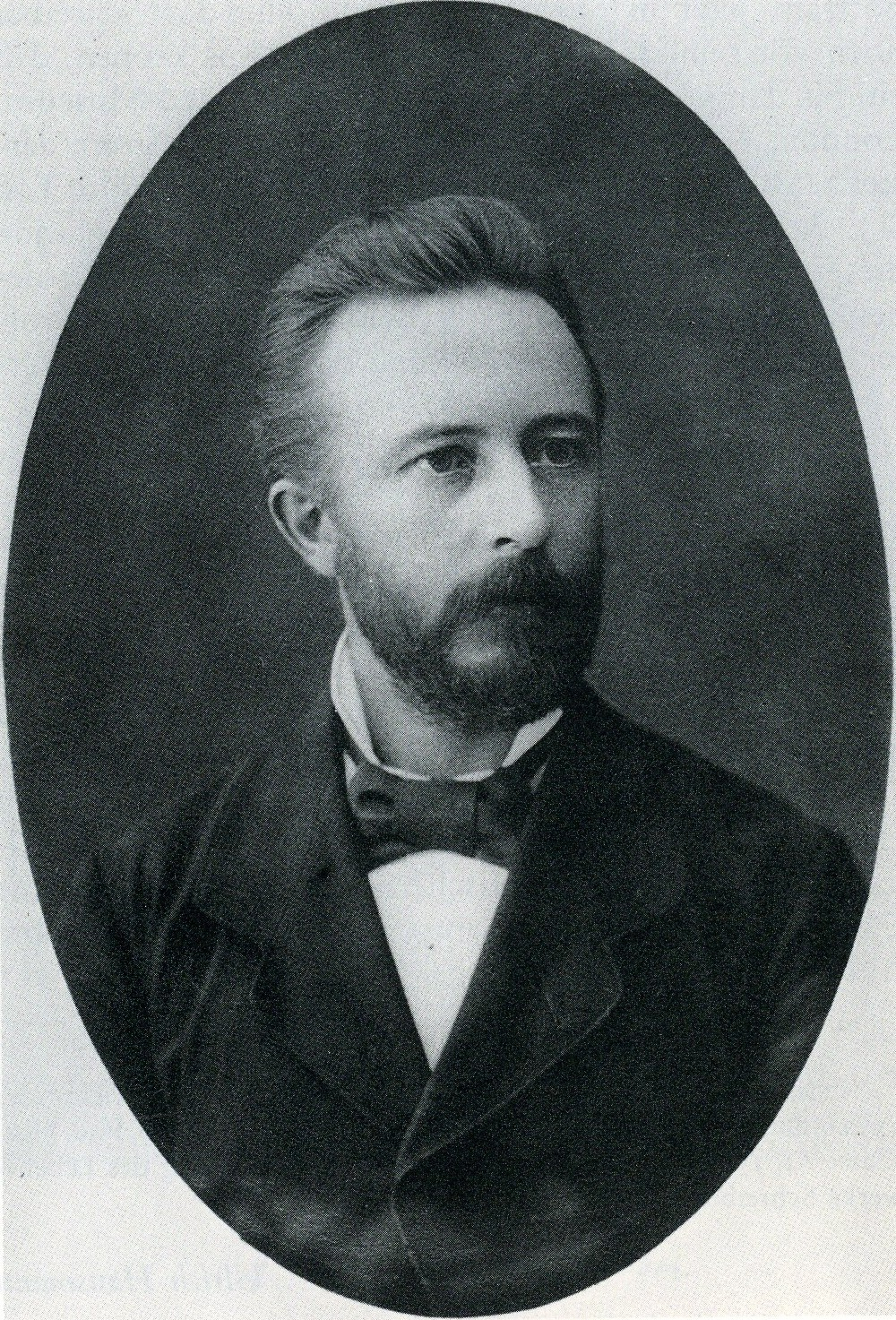
Habbo Gerhard Lolling

Habbo Gerhard Lolling (23 November 1848, Tergast near Emden – 22 February 1894, Athens) was a German classical archaeologist.

He studied classical philology and archaeology at the University of Göttingen, receiving his doctorate in 1871 with a dissertation on Medusa. Following graduation, he relocated to Athens as a tutor. He would live and work in Greece, mainly Athens, for the rest of his life. In 1876 he began work as an editor for the Verlag Karl Baedeker in Athens, and in 1879 was hired as a librarian by the German Archaeological Institute, where he served on the editorial board of the journal, Mitteilungen des Deutschen Archäologischen Instituts, Athenische Abteilung. From 1888 up until his death, he worked as a curator at the National Archaeological Museum of Athens.

In 1878 he assisted Carl Humann with excavatory work at Pergamon in Asia Minor. In 1879 he uncovered a Mycenaean tholos tomb near the village of Menidi, which is now the suburb of Acharnes to the north of Athens.

== Selected works ==
- 1880: Das Kuppelgrab bei Menidi – The domed grave near Menidi.
- 1883: Griechenland. Handbuch für Reisende; (as editor) later published in English as: "Greece. Handbook for travelers". London 1889.
- 1889: Hellenische Landeskunde und Topographie. In: Handbuch der klassischen Altertums-Wissenschaft in systematischer Darstellung – Hellenic cultural studies and topography.
