= Boekzetelerfehn =

- Village of Moormerland
- Interactive map of Boekzetelerfehn
- Location within Germany Location within Lower Saxony
- Country: Germany
- State: Lower Saxony
- District: Leer
- Municipality: Moormerland

Area
  - Village of Moormerland: 6.75 km^{2} (2.61 sq mi)
- Elevation: 1 m (3.3 ft)

Population
  - Metro: 748
- Time zone: UTC+01:00 (CET)
  - Summer (DST): UTC+02:00 (CEST)
- Postal codes: 26802
- Dialling codes: 04954

Boekzetelerfehn is a village in the region of East Frisia, in Lower Saxony, Germany. Administratively, it is an Ortsteil of the municipality of Moormerland. Boekzetelerfehn is located just to the northeast of Warsingsfehn and is approximately 11 kilometers to the north of Leer. It has a population of 748.

Formerly, Boekzetelerfehn was an independent municipality that, together with ten other villages, has formed the municipality of Moormerland since the municipal reform in 1973. To the village of Boekzetelerfehn belongs also the more northern settlement of Boekzeteler Hoek.
