= Neermoor =

- Village of Moormerland
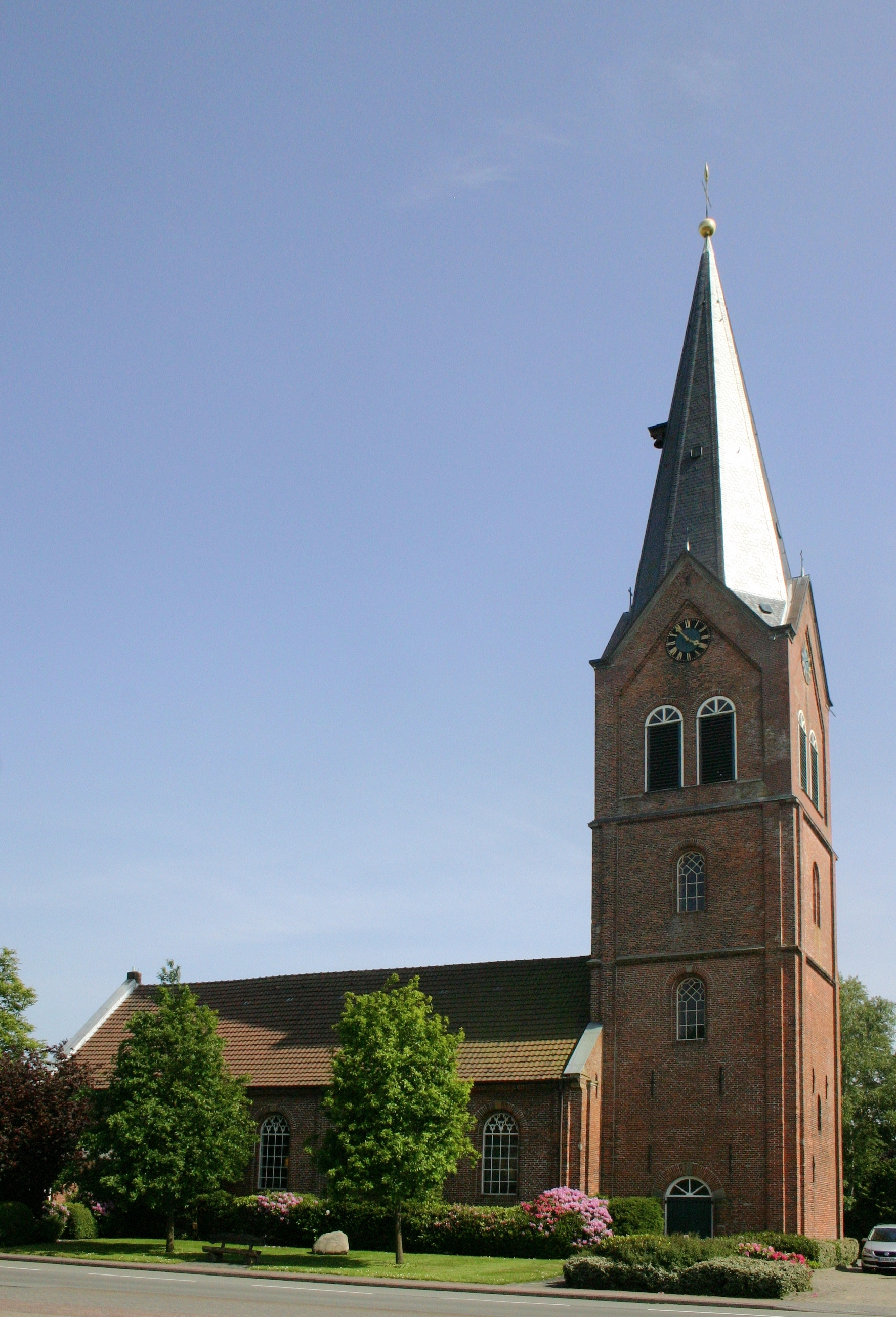
- Reformed Church

- Coat of arms
- Interactive map of Neermoor
- Location within Germany Location within Lower Saxony
- Country: Germany
- State: Lower Saxony
- District: Leer
- Municipality: Moormerland

Area
  - Village of Moormerland: 19.21 km^{2} (7.42 sq mi)
- Elevation: 1 m (3.3 ft)

Population
  - Metro: 4,748
- Time zone: UTC+01:00 (CET)
  - Summer (DST): UTC+02:00 (CEST)
- Postal codes: 26802
- Dialling codes: 04954

Neermoor is a village in the region of East Frisia, in Lower Saxony, Germany. Administratively, it is an Ortsteil of the municipality of Moormerland. Located to the west of the river Ems, Neermoor is approximately 8 kilometers to the north of Leer. It has a population of 4,748.

== History ==
Neermoor is a subsidiary settlement of Edana and was probably founded further east on the edge of the moor before its demise in the 11th century. The oldest documented mention dates back to the year 1400. In one document Neermoor is listed as Edenramora. Later name variants were Nymramore (1409), Eramoere (1428), Edramora (1436), Eddermore (1439), Neydermoer (1481), Neddermoer (1494) and Neermohr (1577). The place name is probably derived from the desolate parent settlement of Edana.

During the Middle Ages there were two castles owned by the East Frisian chieftains Focko Ukena and his son Uko Fockena in Neermoor. A castle stood on today's Vossbergweg at the corner of the Burgstrasse. The second stood between today's Osterstrasse and Süderstrasse.

In 1422, a small church was built away from the village center on a hill near the old cemetery, which was replaced by the Reformed Church from 1797. The Old Reformed Church dates from 1865.

== Gallery ==
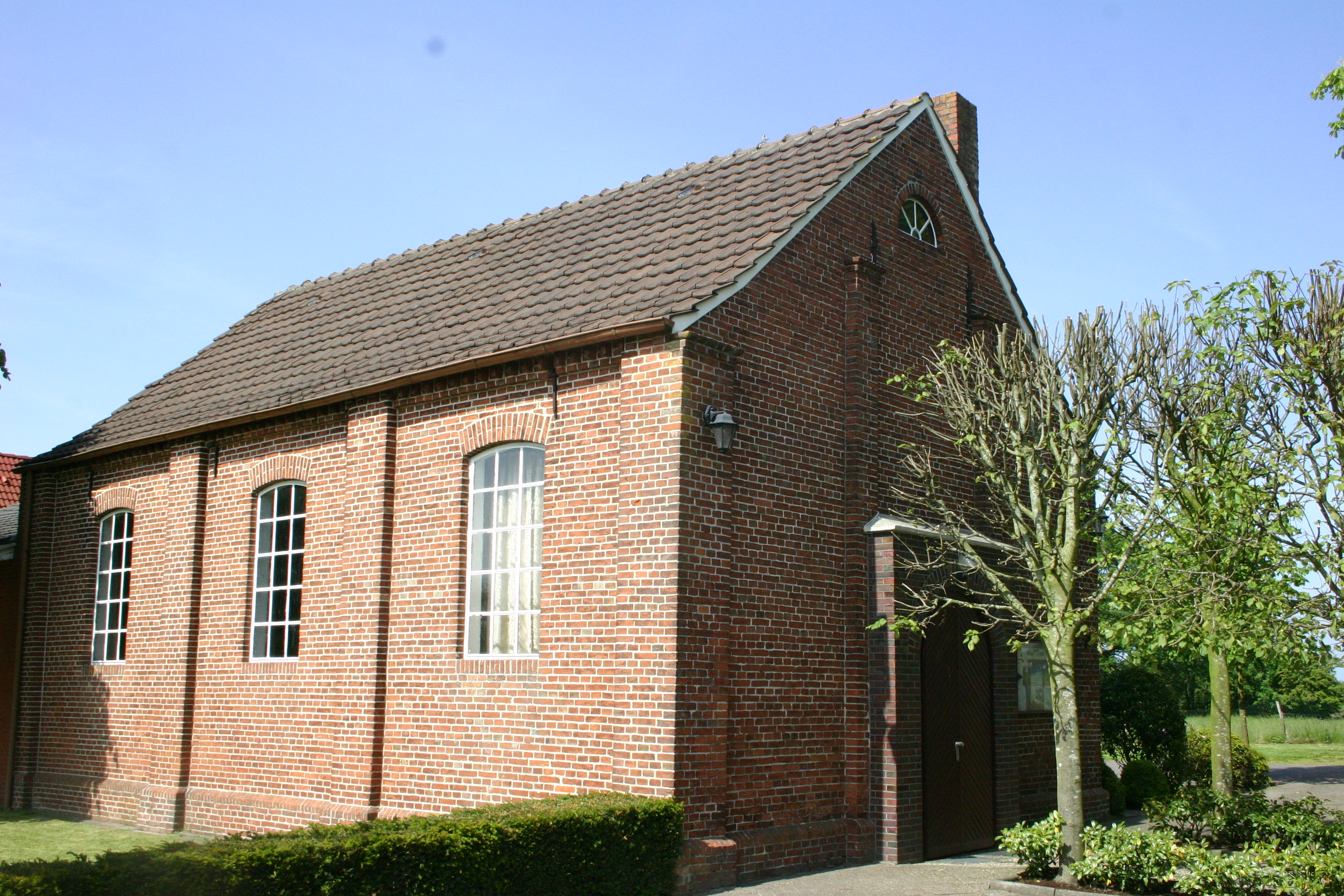
Old Reformed Church

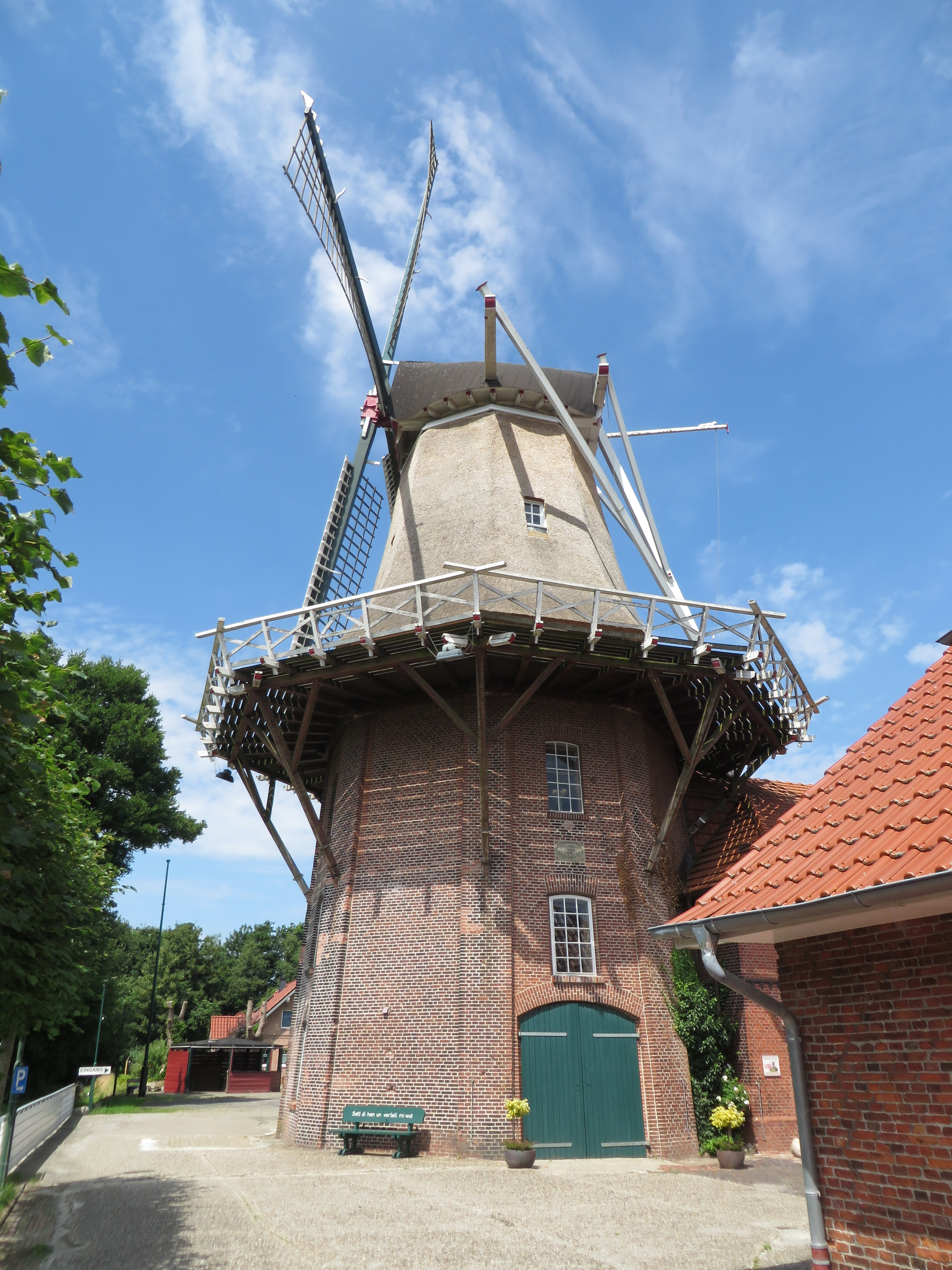
Historic windmill

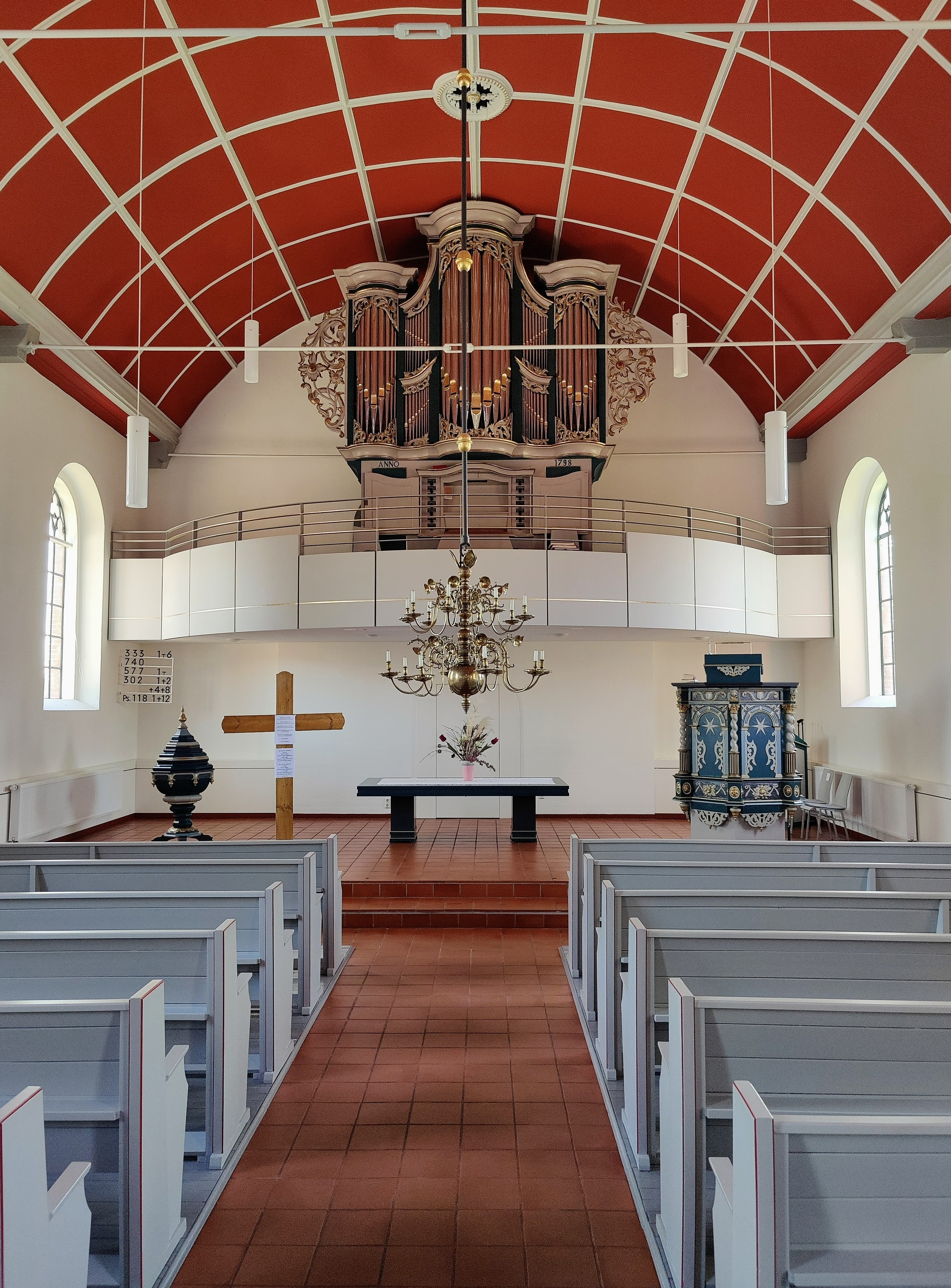
Interior of the Reformed Church

== Notable people ==
- Focko Ukena (1360/1370–1435), East Frisian chieftain
