= Friedhelm Erich Haak =

- Born: 1945 (age 80–81); Moormerland
- Occupation: Publisher
- Known for: Madsack Publishing

Friedhelm Erich Haak (born 11 November 1945 in Moormerland/Boekzetelerfehn) is a German newspaper publisher, media entrepreneur and consultant. He was Chairman of the Supervisory Board of Verlagsgesellschaft Madsack from 2006 to 2013.

In October 1983, Haak became managing director for finance and audiovisual markets at Verlagsgesellschaft Madsack. One year later he founded the TV production company TVN Group Holding as founding managing director for Madsack, which realised the broadcasting of several regional programmes. In 1995, Haak took over the chairmanship of the Madsack Group Board of Directors. The same year he initiated the art prize of the Leipziger Volkszeitung together with Bernd Radestock, which subsequently gained international importance. After eleven years as CEO, Haak moved to the chairmanship of the Supervisory Board in 2006 and was succeeded by Herbert Flecken. Haak then became self-employed as a media consultant and worked mainly in the field of strategic management consulting.

Haak is an art collector and is also involved in the renovation of the Anzeiger-Hochhaus in Hanover, among other things. On his behalf, the Mendini brothers of architects designed the Mendini-House, a corner property in the city centre for media use. Friedhelm Haak is a member of the Board of Trustees of the MHHplus Foundation of Hannover Medical School and of the Senate of the International Foundation for Neurobionics. Haak was also a member of the Board of Trustees of the Humboldt University Foundation in Berlin from 2013 to 2019 and a member of the Association of Northwest German Publishers (VNZV) as well as a member of the supervisory board of the Deutsche Presse-Agentur from 2005 to 2006.

== Scientific publications ==
- Friedhelm Haak: Computergestützte Informationssysteme in Regierung und Verwaltung: Strukturen, Konzepte und ihre gesellschaftspolitischen Implikationen, Zentrum Berlin für Zukunftsforschung e.V., 1973

== Literature ==
- Simone Benne, Henning Queren, Thomas Düffert, Sven Fischer: Friedhelm Haak – eine Karriere bei Madsack, Mediengruppe Madsack, 2013.

== See also ==
- Leipziger Volkszeitung
- Dresdner Neueste Nachrichten
