= Borssum, Emden =

Borssum
- District of Emden
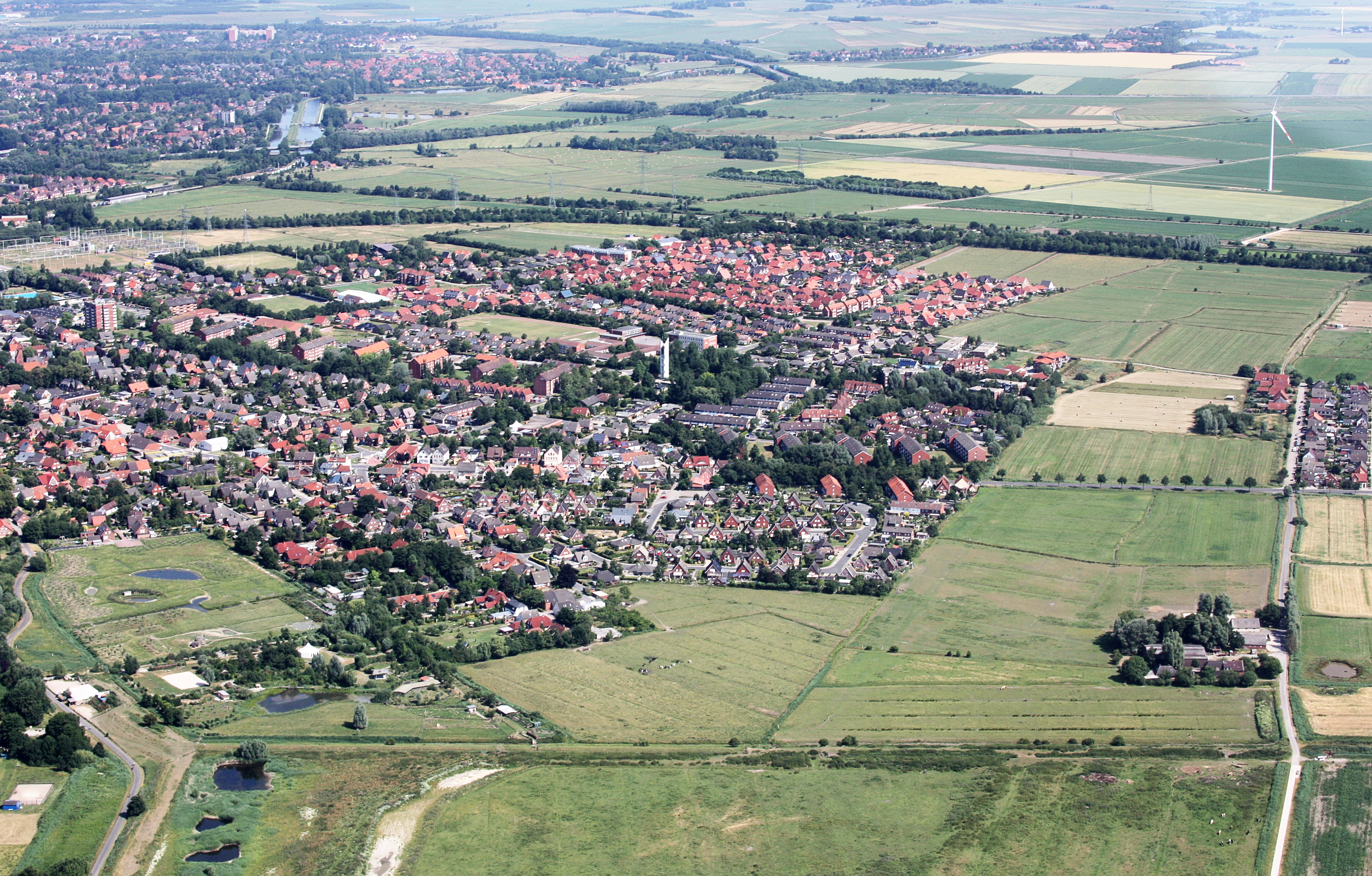
- Aerial view of Borssum

- Location of Borssum-Hilmarsum within Emden
- Interactive map of Borssum
- Location within Germany Location within Lower Saxony
- Coordinates: 53.34534°N 7.22356°E
- Country: Germany
- State: Lower Saxony
- City: Emden

Population
  - Metro: 6,052
- Time zone: UTC+01:00 (CET)
  - Summer (DST): UTC+02:00 (CEST)
- Dialling codes: 04921
- Vehicle registration: 26725

Borssum or Borßum is a village in Lower Saxony, Germany. Together with the village of Hilmarsum it forms a district (Stadtteil) of Emden. The East Frisian village on the Eems is located southeast of the city.

The history of Borssum dates back to the seventh century. It originated from two centres, Groß-Borssum and Klein-Borssum, both of which had a borg. Today, the Westerburg School and the Osterburg School are located on the location of both buildings.

The historic village with a church from the thirteenth century, has grown into one of the larger districts of Emden, especially after the Second World War.

== Gallery ==
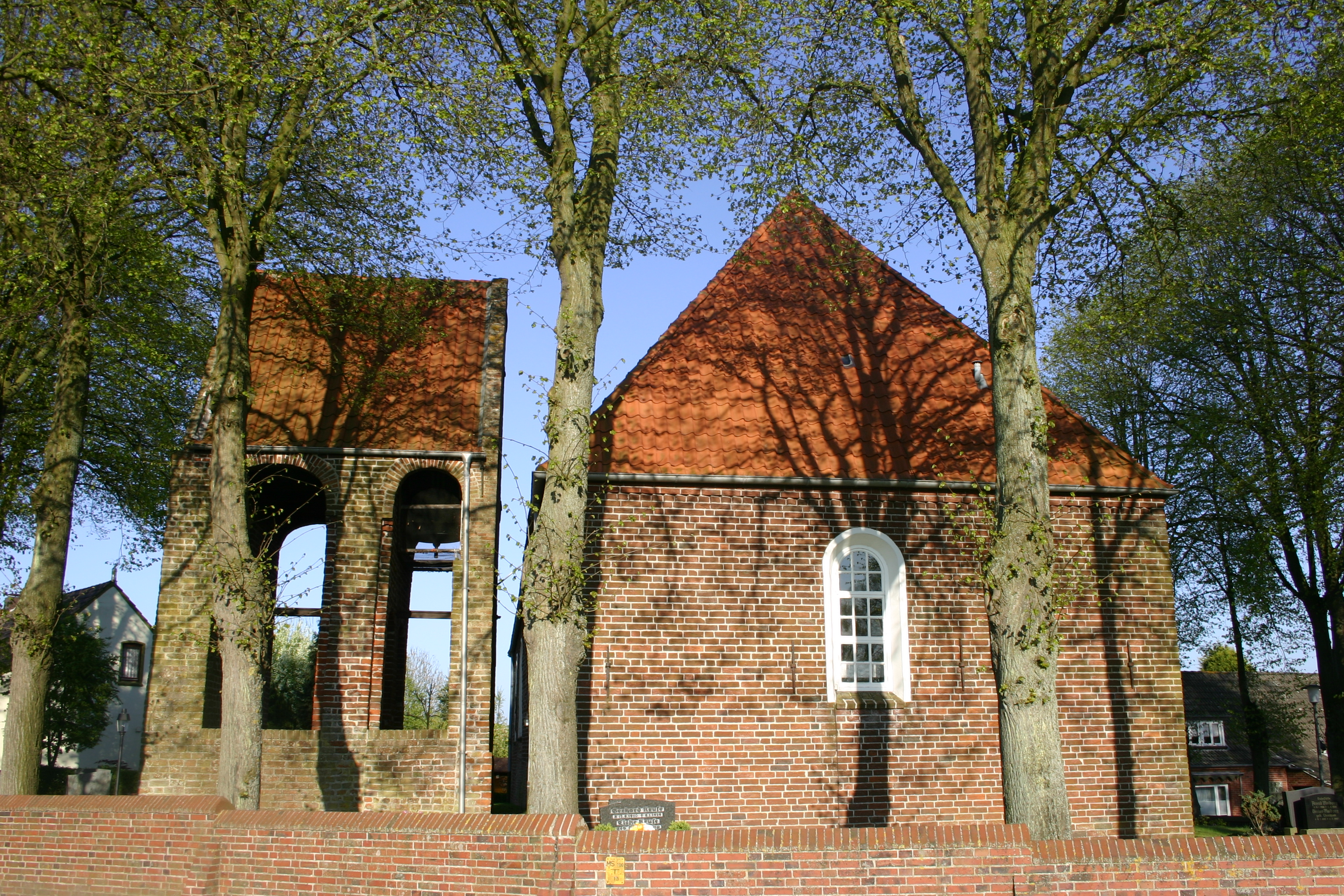
Alte Kirche ('Old Church')

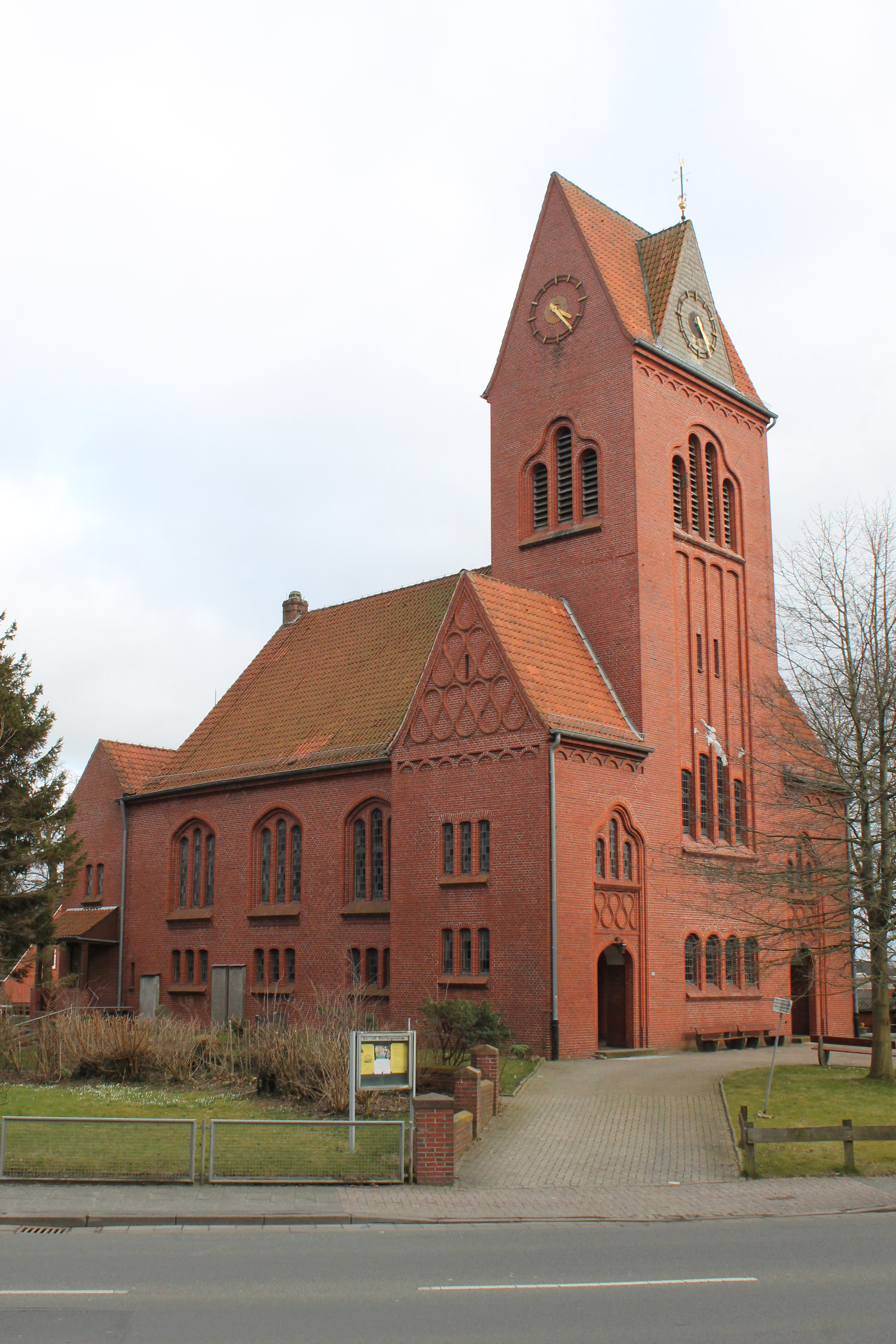
Jugendstil Reformed Church

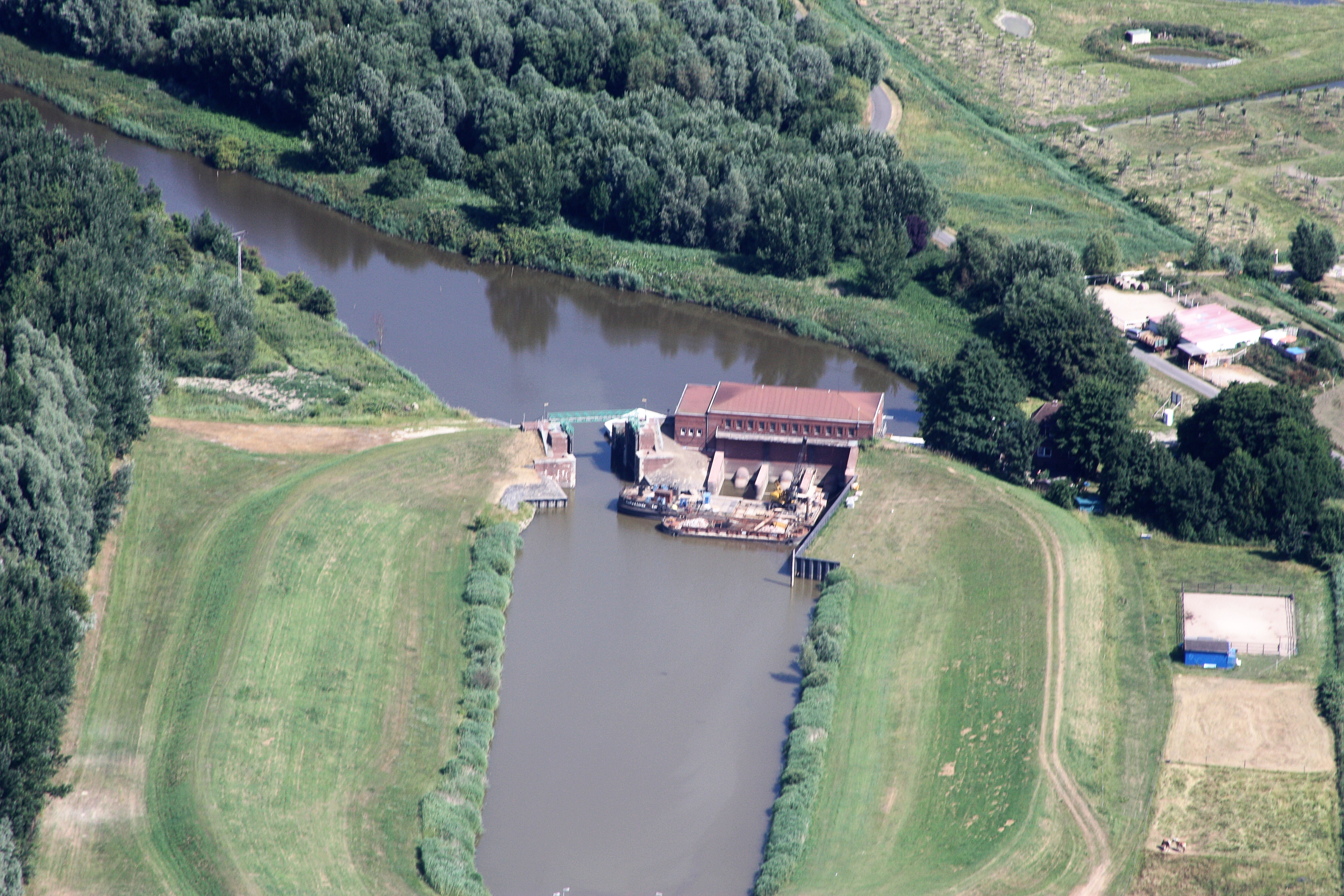
Lock near Borssum
