= Habbo, Morocco =

Settlement in Chichaoua Province, Marrakesh-Safi, Morocco

Coordinates: 31°10′40″N 8°59′33″W

Habbo is a settlement in Chichaoua Province, Marrakesh-Safi, Morocco.
