= Moormerland =

- Municipality
- Coat of arms

- Location of Moormerland within Leer district
- Interactive map of Moormerland
- Location within Germany Location within Lower Saxony
- Coordinates: 53°19′11″N 7°25′22″E
- Country: Germany
- State: Lower Saxony
- District: Leer

Government
  - Mayor (2021–26): Hendrik Schulz (SPD)

Area
  - Total: 122 km^{2} (47 sq mi)
- Elevation: 1 m (3.3 ft)

Population (2025-12-31)
  - Total: 23,357
  - Density: 191/km^{2} (496/sq mi)
- Time zone: UTC+01:00 (CET)
  - Summer (DST): UTC+02:00 (CEST)
- Postal codes: 26802
- Dialling codes: 04954, 04945, 04924
- Vehicle registration: LER
- Website: moormerland.conne.net

Moormerland is a municipality in the Leer District, in Lower Saxony, northwestern Germany.

== History ==
Moormerland was created on January 1, 1973 by uniting eleven independent municipalities. The eleven constituent Ortschafte are:

| Village | Population (2016) |
|---|---|
| Boekzetelerfehn | 748 |
| Gandersum | 85 |
| Hatshausen | 602 |
| Jheringsfehn | 2,440 |
| Neermoor | 4,748 |
| Oldersum | 1,533 |
| Rorichum | 444 |
| Terborg | 105 |
| Tergast | 457 |
| Veenhusen | 4,157 |
| Warsingsfehn | 7,951 |
| Total | 23,270 |

== Notable people ==
- Friedhelm Erich Haak (born 1945) - newspaper publisher
