= Warsingsfehn =

- Village of Moormerland
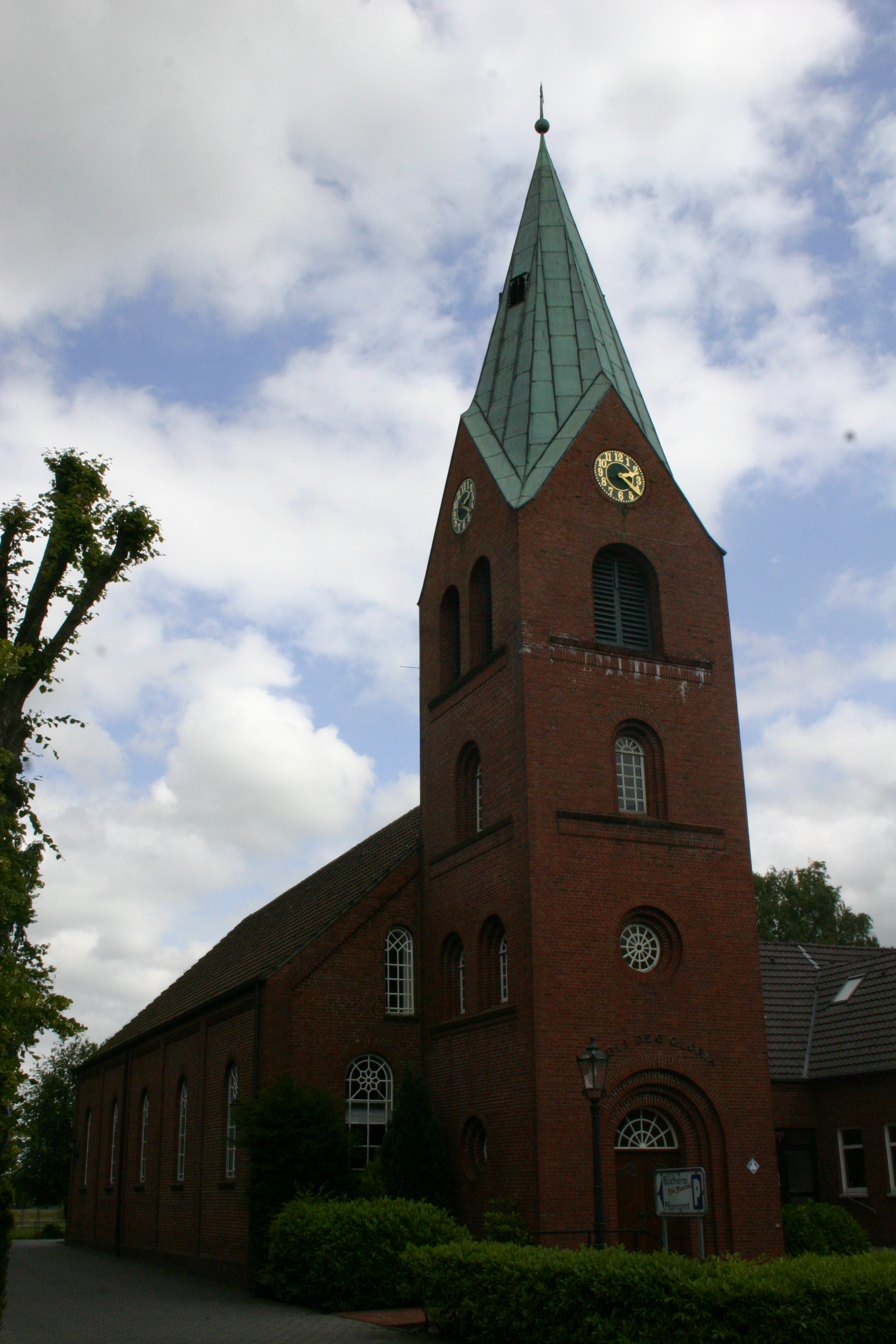
- St. James' Church

- Coat of arms
- Interactive map of Warsingsfehn
- Location within Germany Location within Lower Saxony
- Country: Germany
- State: Lower Saxony
- District: Leer
- Municipality: Moormerland

Area
  - Village of Moormerland: 12.6 km^{2} (4.9 sq mi)
- Elevation: 1 m (3.3 ft)

Population
  - Metro: 7,951
- Time zone: UTC+01:00 (CET)
  - Summer (DST): UTC+02:00 (CEST)
- Postal codes: 26802
- Dialling codes: 04954

Warsingsfehn is a village in the region of East Frisia, in Lower Saxony, Germany. It is the capital of the municipality of Moormerland. Warsingsfehn is located just to the north of Veenhusen and is approximately 9 kilometers to the north of Leer. With a population of 7,951, it is the most populated village of the municipality.

== History ==
The village of Warsingsfehn was created as a moor colony in the 18th century. The village was flooded during the Christmas Flood of 1717 and was then moved to its current, higher location. The birth of the peat colony of Warsingsfehn is considered to be 16 November 1736. On this date, landowner Gerhard Warsing received a leasehold of a raised moor area of 225 hectares. Under his son Hermann Warsing, the lease area was expanded again: in 1769 by 50 hectares, in 1776 by 62 hectares, and in 1779 by ten hectares.

The Warsings gave out the properties on the canal and side canals that branched off at right angles to subleaseholders. They cultivated the moor by first removing the upper layer of white peat and then digging out the black peat underneath to serve as fuel. The peat was then transported by barge to the surrounding cities, especially Emden and Leer, as heating material. After the black peat layer was excavated, the white peat layer was placed back on the moor soil. Since it has little yield, it was mixed with animal dung from the marshes of East Frisia and fertilized in this way. However, the moor settlers were usually only able to make a modest living.

Many people from Warsingsfehn therefore switched to shipping early on. While in 1751 there were five smaller peat ships and four other inland waterway ships on the Warsingsfehn canals, the number had already risen to 31 peat ships by 1816. However, to generate additional sources of income, the captains also sailed in small sea transport between ports on the North Sea coast. In 1816, Warsingsfehn was also home to twelve seagoing ships in addition to the peat ships. By the end of the 19th century, their number had risen to a total of 82, before the advent of steam shipping gave the small sailors competition, against which they could not compete. In addition to the captains and owners, many sailors from Warsingsfehn also went to sea.

Agriculture, which was mostly part-time anyway, could not feed the residents less and less. Between 1816 and 1831 alone, the cultivated area increased from 90 to 205 hectares. At the end of the 19th century, however, there was hardly any moorland left that could be cultivated. There was therefore a wave of emigration to the United States, especially in the last three decades of the 19th century, with more than 100 inhabitants leaving their village.

Due to the social structure (moor colonists, sailors), there was clear support for the SPD in Warsingsfehn since the emergence of the workers' movement, and then also for the Communist Party in the Weimar Republic. However, especially since the May 1924 German federal election, this was always offset by a significant share of votes from right-wing parties. In the July 1932 German federal election, the NSDAP was 50 percent ahead of the SPD (25.2 percent) and the KPD (17 percent) combined. In the second place, however, was the strictly evangelical Christian Social People's Service.

During the National Socialist era, officials from the SPD and KPD were exposed to political persecution. Nine people whose place of birth or residence was Warsingsfehn were killed in the concentration camps Auschwitz, Sobibor, and Kauen.

On the occasion of the Lower Saxony municipal reform, Warsingsfehn was united with the surrounding communities on 1 January 1973 to form the new large municipality of Moormerland. When it came to the question of the location of the municipal administration, Warsingsfehn prevailed over the neighboring town of Neermoor: although Warsingsfehn is one of the youngest towns in the municipality of Moormerland, it had already grown into by far the largest in the early 1970s.

== Gallery ==
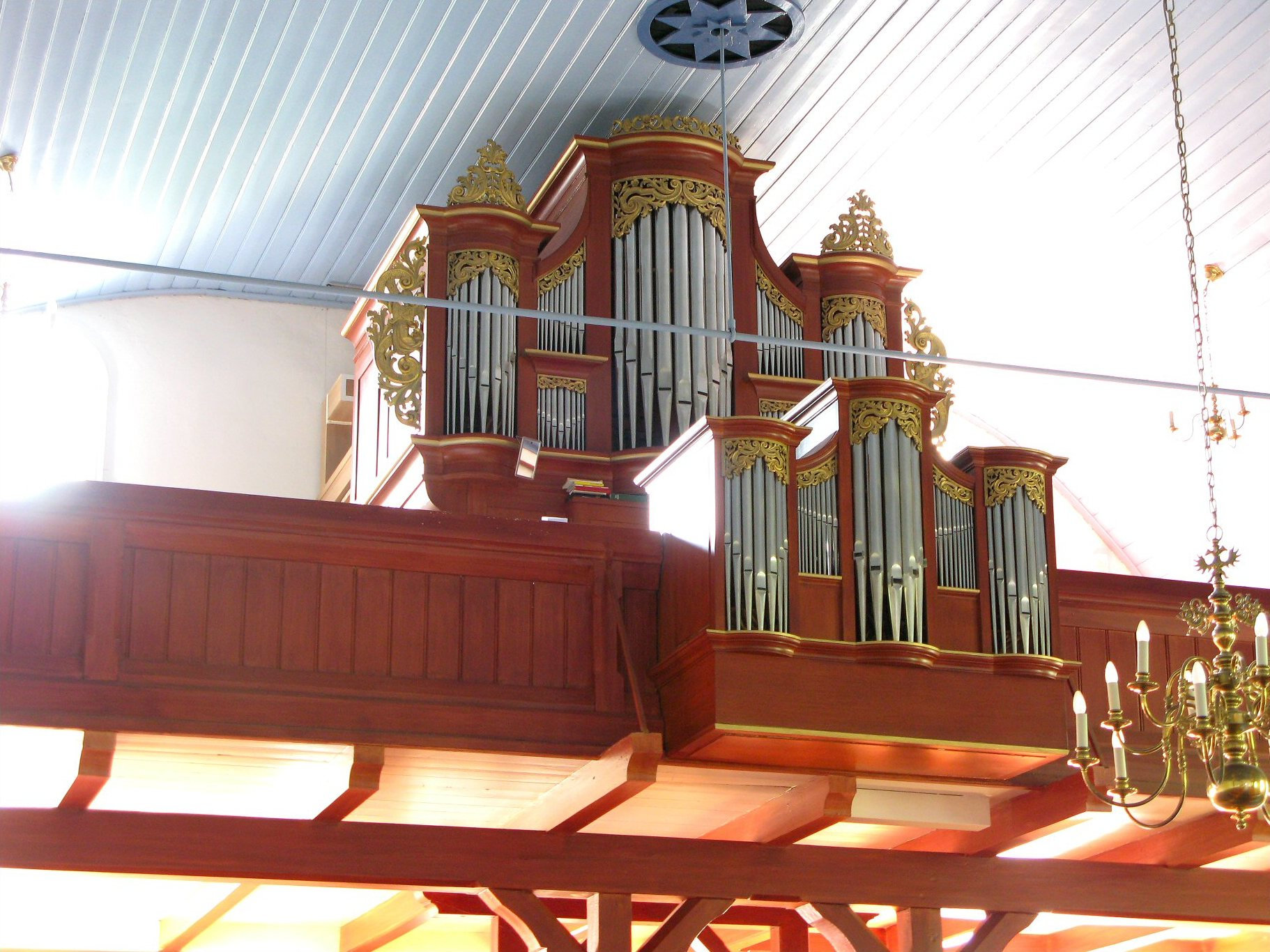
Organ in the St. James' Church

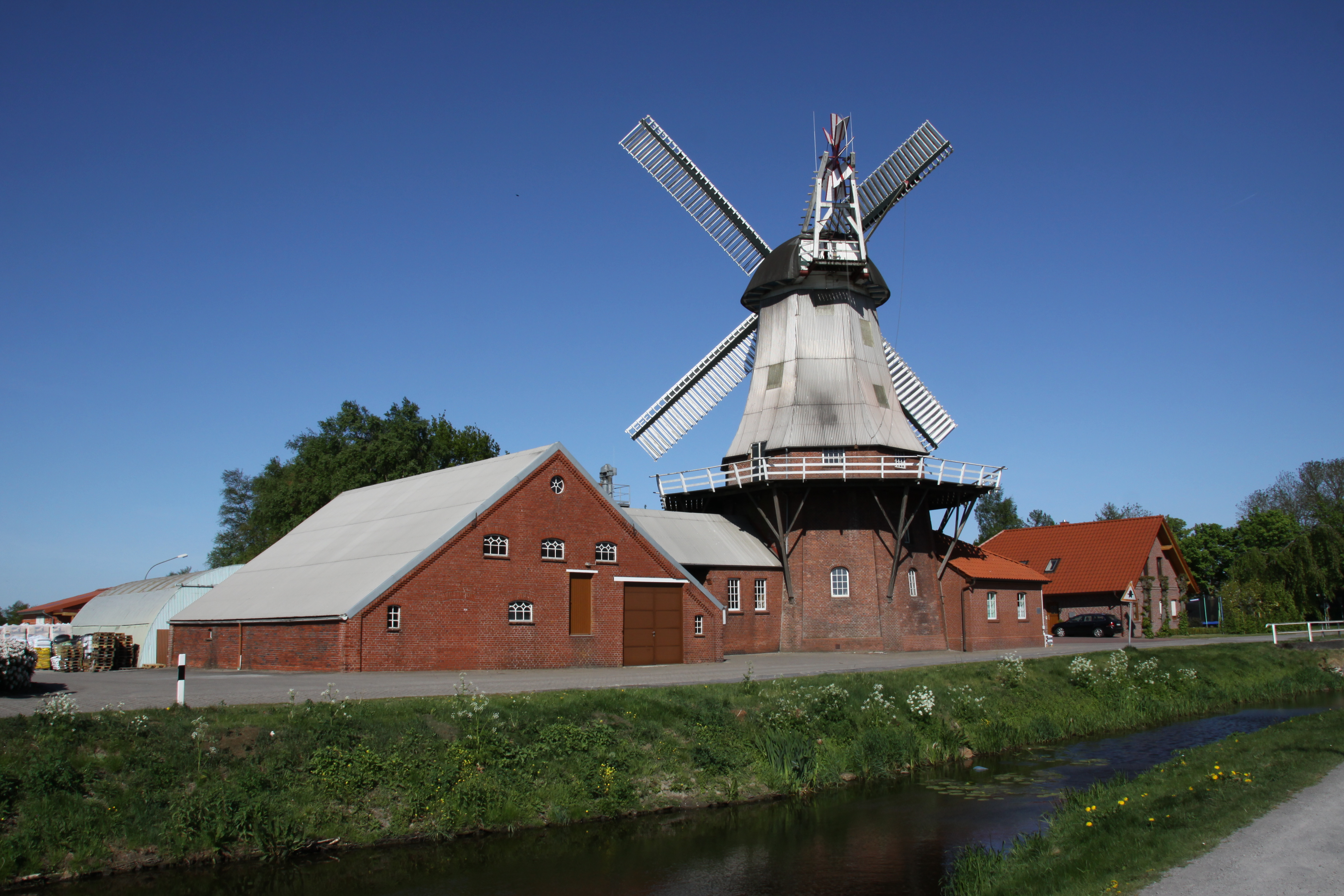
Wind mill

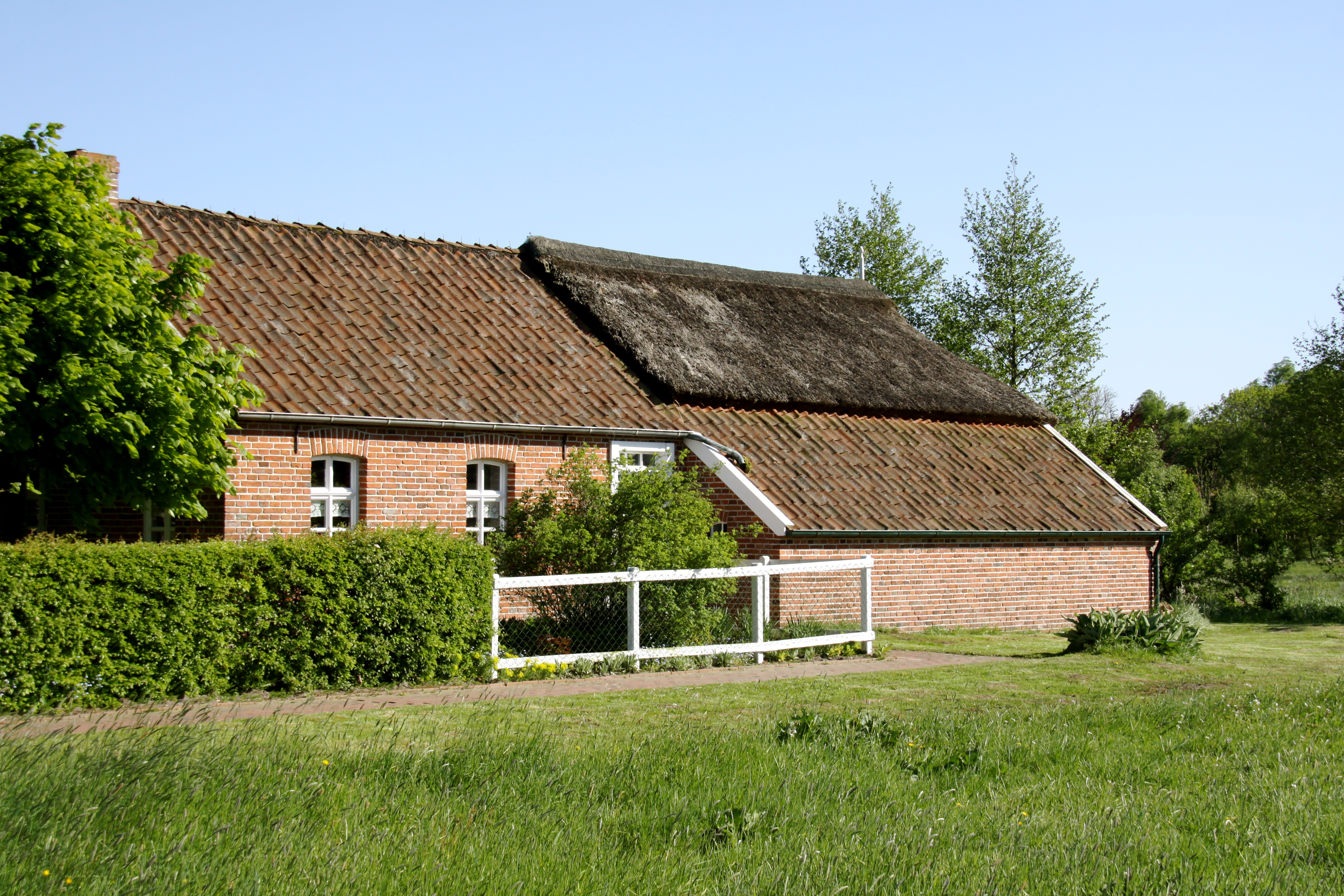
Farmhouse
