= Oldersum =

- Village of Moormerland
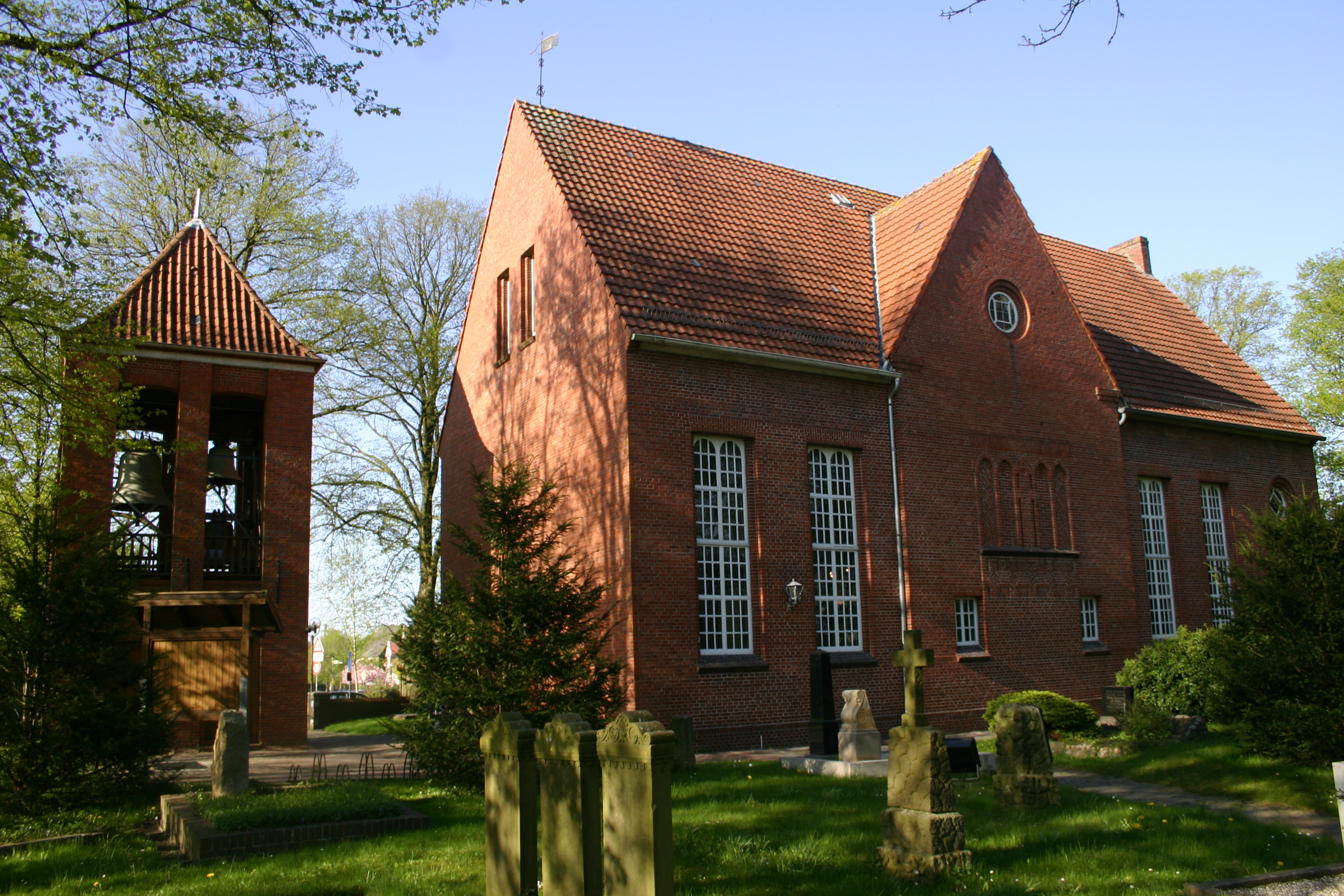
- Church of Oldersum

- Coat of arms
- Interactive map of Oldersum
- Location within Germany Location within Lower Saxony
- Country: Germany
- State: Lower Saxony
- District: Leer
- Municipality: Moormerland

Area
  - Village of Moormerland: 11.15 km^{2} (4.31 sq mi)
- Elevation: 3 m (9.8 ft)

Population
  - Metro: 1,533
- Time zone: UTC+01:00 (CET)
  - Summer (DST): UTC+02:00 (CEST)
- Postal codes: 26802
- Dialling codes: 04924

Oldersum is a village in the region of East Frisia, in Lower Saxony, Germany. Administratively, it is an Ortsteil of the municipality of Moormerland. Located on the north bank of the Ems estuary, Oldersum is to the southeast of Emden and the northwest of Leer. It has a population of 1,533.

== History ==
Oldersum and the surrounding area formed its own lordship that was controlled by the chief family who named themselves von Oldersum, after the village. Within the lordship, the village had the status of a Flecken. The lordship was sold in 1631 to the city of Emden, which then took control.

In June 1526, the so-called Colloquy of Oldersum (Oldersumer Religionsgespräch) took place in the church of Oldersum, between a Roman Catholic and a Lutheran theologian. The report drawn up was printed and distributed in large numbers and contributed significantly to the Reformation in Northern Germany and the Dutch province of Groningen.

The old church of Oldersum was destroyed by fire in 1916 and later replaced by a new building.

== Gallery ==
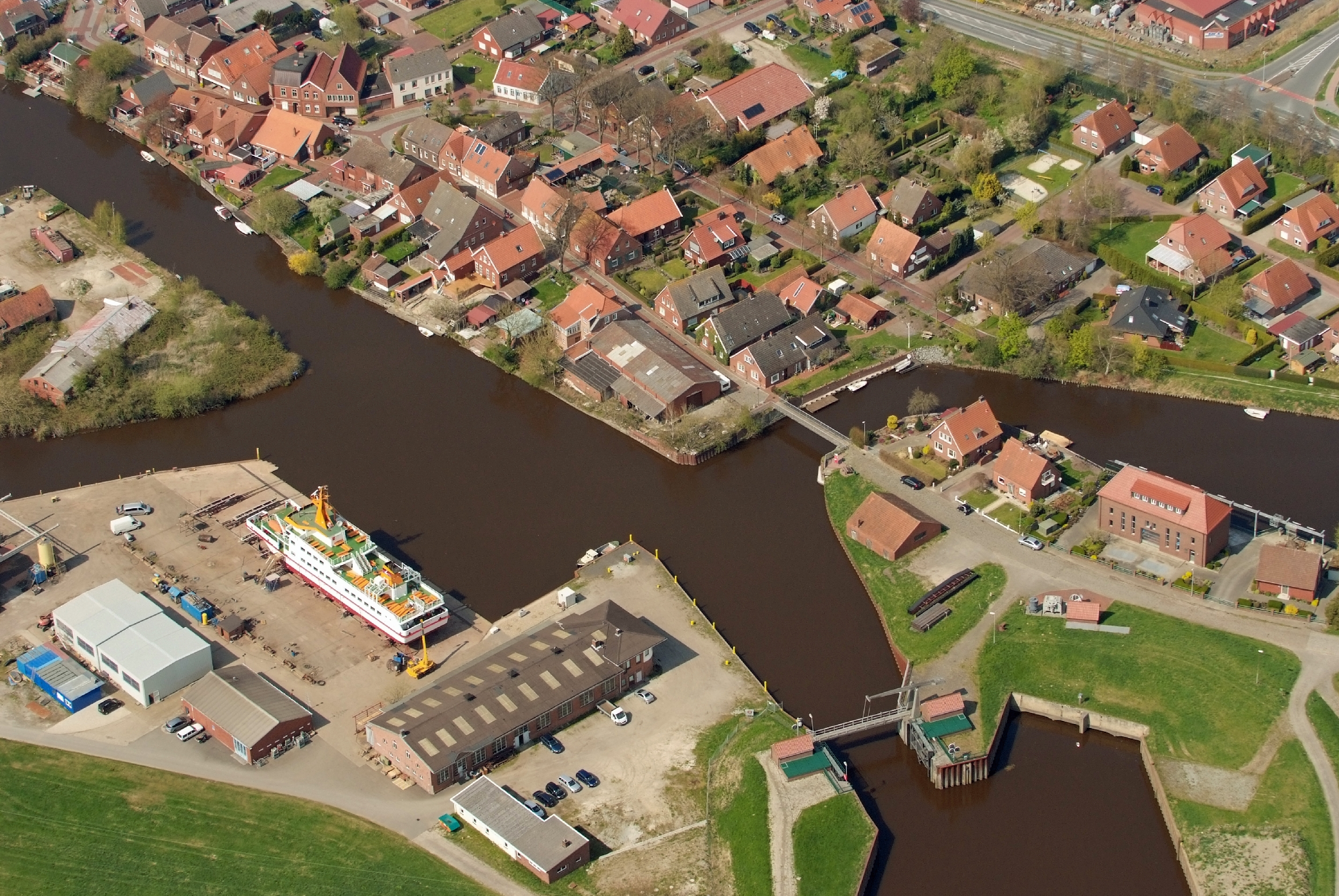
Aerial view of the harbor

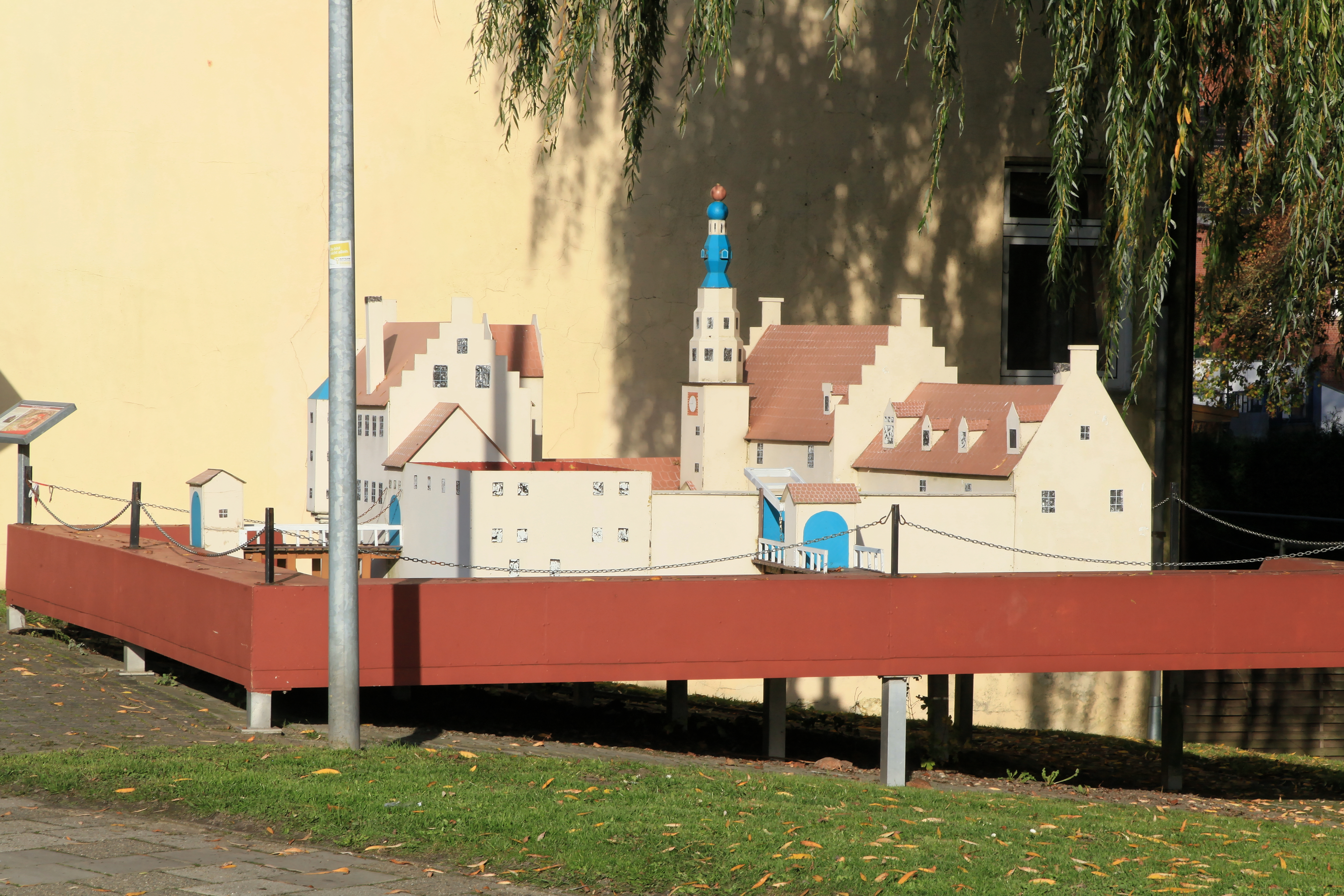
Model of Oldersum Castle

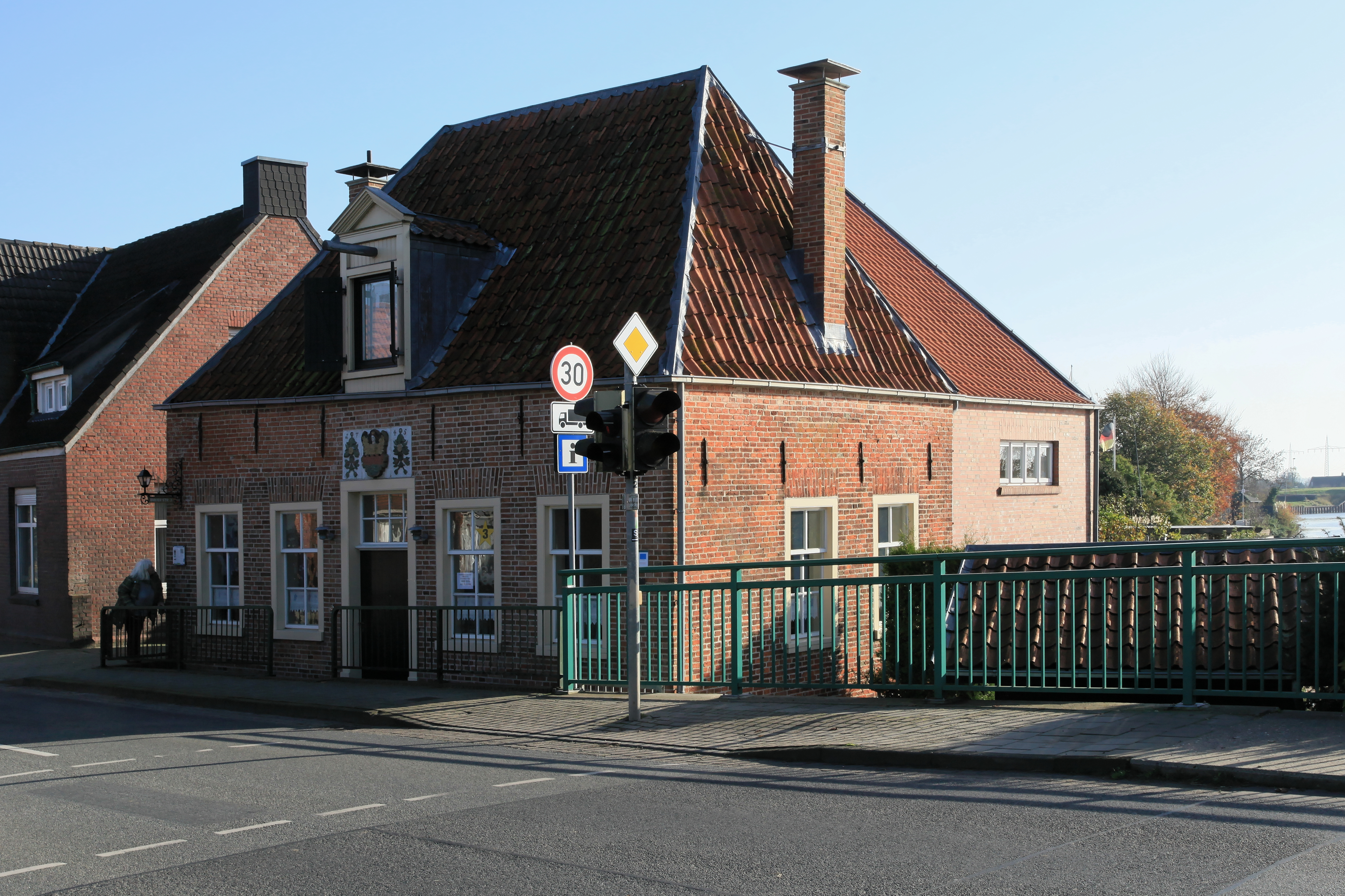
Alte Waage

== Notable people ==
- Uko Fockena (c. 1408–1432), East Frisian chieftain
- Theda Ukena (1432–1494), Countess and regent of East Frisia
