= Uko of East Frisia =

Count of East Frisia

Uko
- Count of East Frisia
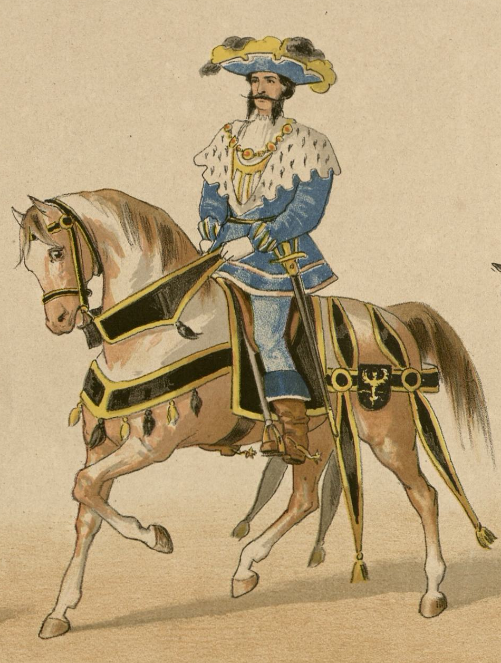
- Uko Cirksena during the joyful entry of his brother, Count Edzard I of East Frisia as 'lord of Groningen' in 1506.
- Born: 1 April 1464
- Died: 10 July 1507 (aged 43)
- House: Cirksena
- Father: Ulrich I
- Mother: Theda Ukena

Uko of East Frisia (1 April 1464 – 10 July 1507) was the third and youngest son of Count Ulrich I of East Frisia and his wife Theda Ukena.

== Biography ==
Uko of East Frisia was enrolled at the University of Cologne as a student in 1481. Like his older brothers Enno I and Edzard I, Uko had a share in the government of the County of East Frisia. Together with his brother Edzard I, he requested confirmation in 1495 of their rule over East Frisia, which the Cirksena counts had had since 1464. However, Edzard and Uko used a forged document in which it was clearly stated that their county extended far to the east and also included areas such as Butjadingen, Stadland, Jeverland and Harlingerland; areas that were in fact not within the sphere of influence of the counts of East Frisia. The political agenda of Edzard and Uko was therefore clear: East Frisia should take over these areas in order to unite all Frisian areas between the rivers Ems and the Weser. Uko also played an important role west of the Ems, together with his brother. He played a role during the Saxon feud that ravaged Frisia between 1498 and 1517. Together with his brother Edzard I, he swore allegiance to the Duke of Saxony who had been appointed as hereditary governor of the entire Frisian area on the North Sea coast. Later he turned against the Saxon duke and, together with Edzard I, took the city of Groningen, formally on behalf of the Empire but in fact for the benefit of the Cirksena dynasty.

== Children ==
According to Tileman Dothias Wiarda, Uko of East Frisia had one illegitimate son, Rudolph Cirksena, with an unknown mistress. However, more recent scholarship identifies Rudolf as an illegitimate son of Enno I of East Frisia.:

- Rudolph Cirksena (c. 1490 - 15 March 1533), married with Gebbeke Hinrichs.

== Ancestors ==
Ancestors of Uko of East Frisia

16. Enno II Edzardisna
8. Edzard II Ennosna
17. Adda Beninga
4. Enno III Edzardisna
18. Keno I tom Brok
9. Doda tom Brok
19. Ocka of Nesse
2. Ulrich I, Count of East Frisia
20. Folkard Beninga
10. Affo Beninga
21. Frouwa of Manslagt
5. Gela Beninga
22. Merten Sydzena
11. Tiadeke Mertens Sydzena
1. Uko of East Frisia
24. Uko Benen
12. Focko Ukena
25. Amke of Lengen
6. Uko Fockena
26. Ewo Tammena
13. Theda of Rheide
27. Bouwa Onsta
3. Theda Ukena
28. Hero Attena
14. Lütet Attena
29. Etta Ennosna
7. Heba Attena
30. Ocko I tom Brok
15. Ocka tom Brok
31. Foelke Kampana

== See also ==
- House of Cirksena
- County of East Frisia
- List of counts of East Frisia
