= Heba of East Frisia =

East Frisian noblewoman (1456/57–after 1492)

- Born: 18 November 1456 or 1457
- Died: after 1492
- Noble family: Cirksena
- Father: Ulrich I
- Mother: Theda Ukena

Heba of East Frisia (* 18 November 1456 or 1457 - after 1492) was, as the wife of Count Erich, Countess of Holstein-Pinneberg.

== Life ==
Heba was the eldest daughter of the chieftain and later the first Count of East Frisia, Ulrich I, Count of East Frisia, and Theda Ukena. She had five siblings.

On 13 September 1475, Count Erich of Holstein-Pinneberg concluded an agreement with her mother, Countess Theda of East Frisia, concerning his marriage to Heba. In this contract, he granted Heba, as her dower, Pinneberg Castle as well as estates and toll revenues in Hamburg. As her dowry, Heba's mother paid the comparatively high sum of 8,000 Rhenish guilders.

The couple married in 1476. The marriage remained childless. After being widowed, Heba returned to East Frisia, where she died sometime after 1492. The year of death is frequently given in the literature as 1476. however, this cannot be correct, since she must have died after Erich of Schaumburg (1492). Furthermore, on 15 November 1478, he declared that his wife Heba could choose the estate at Stadthagen instead of the castle at Pinneberg that had originally been promised to her as her dower.

She was initially buried in the Cirksena family burial vault at Marienthal Monastery in Norden. Before 1558, Countess Anna had the princely burial vault of the Counts of East Frisia established in the Great Church of Emden, and in 1558 Heba's remains were transferred there.

== Ancestors ==
Ancestors of Heba of East Frisia

16. Enno II Edzardisna
8. Edzard II Ennosna
17. Adda Beninga
4. Enno III Edzardisna
18. Keno I tom Brok
9. Doda tom Brok
19. Ocka of Nesse
2. Ulrich I, Count of East Frisia
20. Folkard Beninga
10. Affo Beninga
21. Frouwa of Manslagt
5. Gela Beninga
22. Merten Sydzena
11. Tiadeke Mertens Sydzena
1. Heba of East Frisia
24. Uko Benen
12. Focko Ukena
25. Amke of Lengen
6. Uko Fockena
26. Ewo Tammena
13. Theda of Rheide
27. Bouwa Onsta
3. Theda Ukena
28. Hero Attena
14. Lütet Attena
29. Etta Ennosna
7. Heba Attena
30. Ocko I tom Brok
15. Ocka tom Brok
31. Foelke Kampana

== See also ==
- House of Cirksena
- County of East Frisia
- List of counts of East Frisia
