= Almuth of East Frisia =

East Frisian noblewoman (1465–1522)

- Born: 1465; Emden
- Died: 1522 (aged 56–57); Greetsiel
- Noble family: Cirksena
- Father: Ulrich I
- Mother: Theda Ukena

Almuth of East Frisia (1465 in Emden - 1522 in Greetsiel) was the youngest daughter of Count Ulrich I and his wife Theda Ukena. She became known primarily for her affair with the Westphalian nobleman Engelmann von Hörstel and for her alleged abduction by him. During an attempt to rescue her, the then Count of East Frisia, Enno I, drowned. Almuth's mother, Theda, subsequently had her taken to Burg Greetsiel, where, apart from one unsuccessful escape attempt, she spent the remainder of her life.

Streets in Aurich and Leer are named after Almuth. Her fate has received considerable attention in the historiography of the region.

== Biography ==
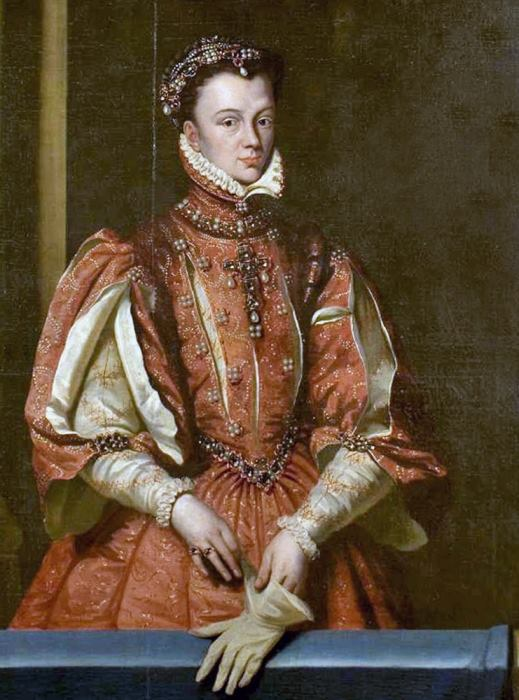
Theda Ukena

Almuth was born in 1465 in Emden as the youngest child of Ulrich I and Theda Ukena. Her father died one year after her birth. Nothing else is known about her childhood and youth.

During her lifetime, the House of Cirksena rose into the ranks of the high non-princely nobility. On 1 October 1464, her father had been elevated to the hereditary rank of Imperial Count by Emperor Frederick III. Thereafter, Theda in particular became very conscious of the family's newly acquired status. She succeeded in marrying her eldest daughter to Count Eric of Holstein and Schauenburg. As a result, the Cirksena family became part of the marriage network of the counts and noble lords of north-western Germany. The other East Frisian chieftain families were henceforth regarded as belonging only to the lower nobility and were no longer considered socially equal. Probably in order to strengthen his standing, Almuth's eldest brother, Count Enno I, set out on a pilgrimage to the Holy Land in 1489, accompanied by Viktor Frese and Folef of Innhausen and Knyphausen. In Jerusalem, he was knighted at the Church of the Holy Sepulchre.

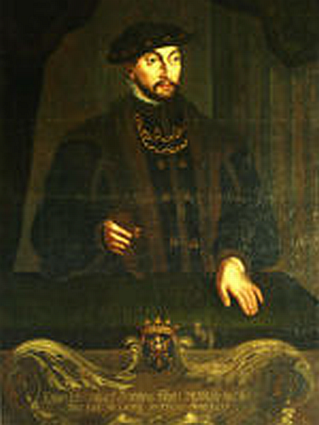
Enno I, Count of East Frisia

During his absence, Theda entrusted the Cirksena castles to loyal supporters. At the court in Emden, the Westphalian nobleman Engelmann von Hörstel was highly regarded. According to surviving documents, he was considered "honourable and capable". While still at court, he began a secret love affair with her daughter Almuth. After Theda appointed him drost of Friedeburg, Almuth allowed herself to be "abducted" by him. According to the surviving accounts, on 15 November 1490 she travelled with one of her chambermaids to Egels, outside the gates of Aurich, where she waited for her lover. He arrived on horseback accompanied by one of his servants, pulled Almuth onto his horse, while his companion took charge of the chambermaid. Eggerik Beninga's Cronica der Fresen describes the event as follows: (he) nam se achter sick up syn perdt unde siner knechte ener de junffer. Together they rode to Burg Friedeburg, where the castle chaplain, Eggo of Oldersum, performed their marriage ceremony later that same day. When Theda learned of what had happened, she immediately travelled to Friedeburg and demanded that her daughter be surrendered. She refused to recognise the marriage because of Engelmann's inferior social rank, but without success. Engelmann claimed that Enno had approved of the marriage, which was untrue. Theda then had the castle besieged by East Frisian mercenaries under the command of Hero Mauritz Kankena of Dornum. Engelmann, however, had prepared for such an eventuality: the castle contained ample supplies of food and firewood.

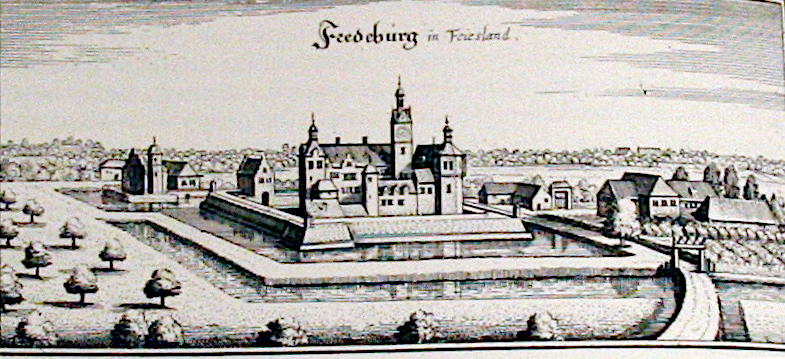
Friedeburg Fortress. Reversed engraving by Merian dating from the second half of the 17th century

In the following February, Enno returned to Europe from his pilgrimage. While in Groningen, he learned of the events at Friedeburg. Enno was beside himself with rage and travelled across the frozen Dollart, via Rheide, Petkum, and Aurich to Friedeburg. There he demanded a meeting with Engelmann. Engelmann agreed and came out before the castle, where the two engaged in a heated argument. He continued to refuse to surrender Almuth. Enno became increasingly enraged. Eventually, the unarmed Engelmann fled across the frozen moat into the castle. Enno, clad in heavy armour and accompanied by two equally armoured servants, pursued him. However, the ice gave way, and on 19 February 1491 Enno and his two servants drowned in the moat of Burg Friedeburg.

A truce was agreed upon to recover the bodies. Afterwards, however, Theda continued the siege. Realising that his situation was hopeless, Engelmann fled under cover of darkness to West Frisia. The castle garrison subsequently surrendered the fortress to the besieging forces. Almuth was seized and taken, together with her two chambermaids, to Aurich. There, Theda and Almuth's siblings bitterly reproached her. Finally, Theda ordered soldiers to take her daughter to Burg Greetsiel, where she was to spend the remainder of her life. Engelmann then sent an elderly woman disguised as a beggar to Greetsiel. With her assistance, Almuth succeeded in escaping across the Ems to Groningen, where she intended to reunite with Engelmann. However, Viktor Frese, who had accompanied Enno on his pilgrimage to the Holy Land, recognised her at an inn and had her arrested. The senate of the city subsequently refused Almuth permission to remain there. Frese immediately returned her to Greetsiel, where her confinement became even more restrictive.

Engelmann appealed to Pope Alexander VI, who confirmed the validity of his marriage to Almuth. Theda, however, refused to recognise the decision or to release her daughter. Almuth remained confined at Greetsiel, where she spent the first three years of her imprisonment together with her mother, who had retired to the castle. Nothing is known about the relationship between the two during this period. In her will, Theda stipulated that Almuth was to continue living at the castle. She further ordered that Almuth should receive an annual allowance of forty Rhenish guilders, sufficient to pay a chambermaid, a maidservant, and a manservant, as well as to cover her living expenses. Almuth died in captivity at Burg Greetsiel in 1522. She was buried at Marienthal Abbey and was later reinterred in the mausoleum of the House of Cirksena in Aurich.

== Ancestors ==
Ancestors of Almuth of East Frisia

16. Enno II Edzardisna
8. Edzard II Ennosna
17. Adda Beninga
4. Enno III Edzardisna
18. Keno I tom Brok
9. Doda tom Brok
19. Ocka of Nesse
2. Ulrich I, Count of East Frisia
20. Folkard Beninga
10. Affo Beninga
21. Frouwa of Manslagt
5. Gela Beninga
22. Merten Sydzena
11. Tiadeke Mertens Sydzena
1. Almuth of East Frisia
24. Uko Benen
12. Focko Ukena
25. Amke of Lengen
6. Uko Fockena
26. Ewo Tammena
13. Theda of Rheide
27. Bouwa Onsta
3. Theda Ukena
28. Hero Attena
14. Lütet Attena
29. Etta Ennosna
7. Heba Attena
30. Ocko I tom Brok
15. Ocka tom Brok
31. Foelke Kampana

== See also ==
- House of Cirksena
- County of East Frisia
- List of counts of East Frisia

== Sources ==
- Karl-Heinz de Wall: In voller Rüstung ging Enno aufs Eis. Ein standeswidriges Verhältnis und die Folgen. In: Ostfriesland Magazin. Ausgabe 02/1991, S. 37.
