= Enno I of East Frisia =

Enno I
- Count of East Frisia
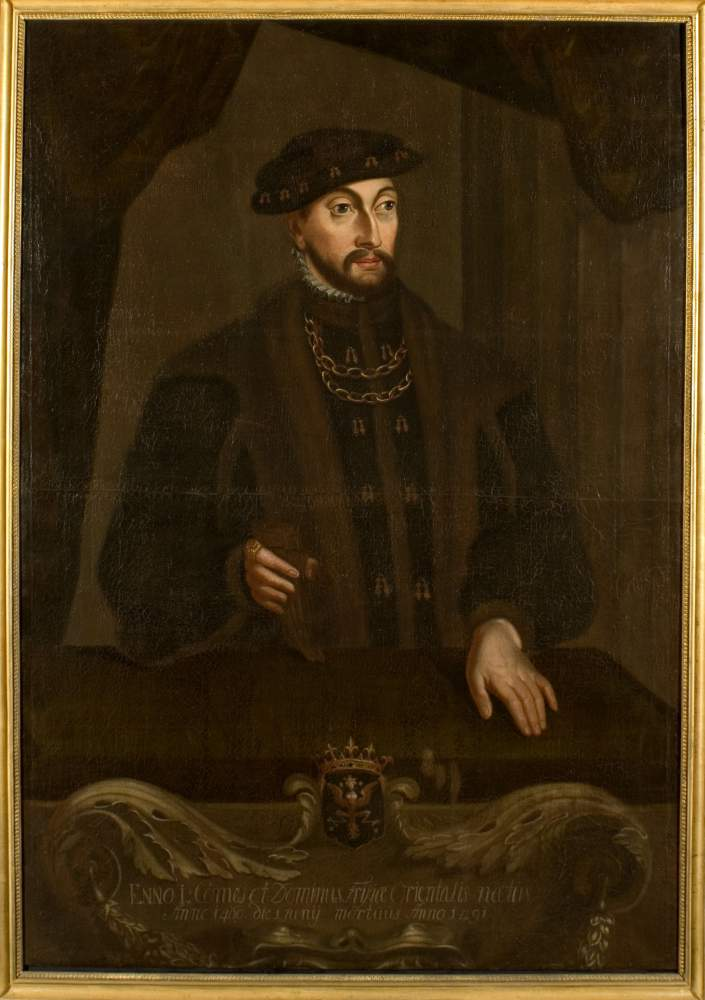
- Enno I, Count of East Frisia

Count of East Frisia
- Reign: 1480 - 19 February 1491
- Predecessor: Theda Ukena (as regent)
- Successor: Edzard I
- Born: 1 June 1460
- Died: 19 February 1491 (aged 30); Friedeburg
- Burial: Kloster Marienthal
- House: Cirksena
- Father: Ulrich I
- Mother: Theda Ukena

Enno I of East Frisia, count of East Frisia (1 June 1460 – Friedeburg, 19 February 1491) was the eldest son of Ulrich I of East Frisia and Theda Ukena, of a chiefly East Frisian family.

== Life ==
Enno I was not particularly interested in succeeding his father as count, so his mother Theda stayed in power. Enno took part in a pilgrimage to the Holy Land, and in Jerusalem he was dubbed Knight of the Holy Sepulchre. During his absence from the county, his sister Almuth fell in love with the noble Engelmann von Horstell, drost of Friedeburg. They made plans to marry, but they were prevented from marrying by Almut's mother Theda. Undeterred, Almut moved with her betrothed to Friedeburg and took the family jewels with her. When Enno returned to East Frisia, he thought his sister had been kidnapped, and he pursued the drost to his castle. As it was winter, the moat around the castle was frozen over and Enno believed he could cross it. His armour was too heavy, and Enno sank through the ice and drowned.

Enno I was 30 years old when he died. His mother Theda had a memorial shield made in his honor, which is still on display in the Great Church, today the Johannes-a-Lasco Library in Emden, on a wall close to the crypt of the Lords of East Frisia.

== Children ==
Enno I of East Frisia had one illegitimate son, Rudolph Cirksena, with an unknown mistress:

- Rudolph Cirksena (c. 1490 - 15 March 1533), married with Gebbeke Hinrichs.

== Ancestors ==
Ancestors of Enno I of East Frisia

16. Enno II Edzardisna
8. Edzard II Ennosna
17. Adda Beninga
4. Enno III Edzardisna
18. Keno I tom Brok
9. Doda tom Brok
19. Ocka of Nesse
2. Ulrich I of East Frisia
20. Folkard Beninga
10. Affo Beninga
21. Frouwa of Manslagt
5. Gela Beninga
22. Merten Sydzena
11. Tiadeke Mertens Sydzena
1. Enno I, Count of East Frisia
24. Uko Benen
12. Focko Ukena
25. Amke of Lengen
6. Uko Fockena
26. Ewo Tammena
13. Theda of Rheide
27. Bouwa Onsta
3. Theda Ukena
28. Hero Attena
14. Lütet Attena
29. Etta Ennosna
7. Heba Attena
30. Ocko I tom Brok
15. Ocka tom Brok
31. Foelke Kampana

== See also ==
- House of Cirksena
- County of East Frisia
- List of counts of East Frisia

Enno I of East Frisia Cirksena Born: 1 June 1460 Died: 19 February 1491
Preceded by Theda (regent)	Count of East Frisia; 1480–1491	Succeeded by Edzard I
