= Attena =

Former ruling family of East Frisia

House of Attena
- Noble family
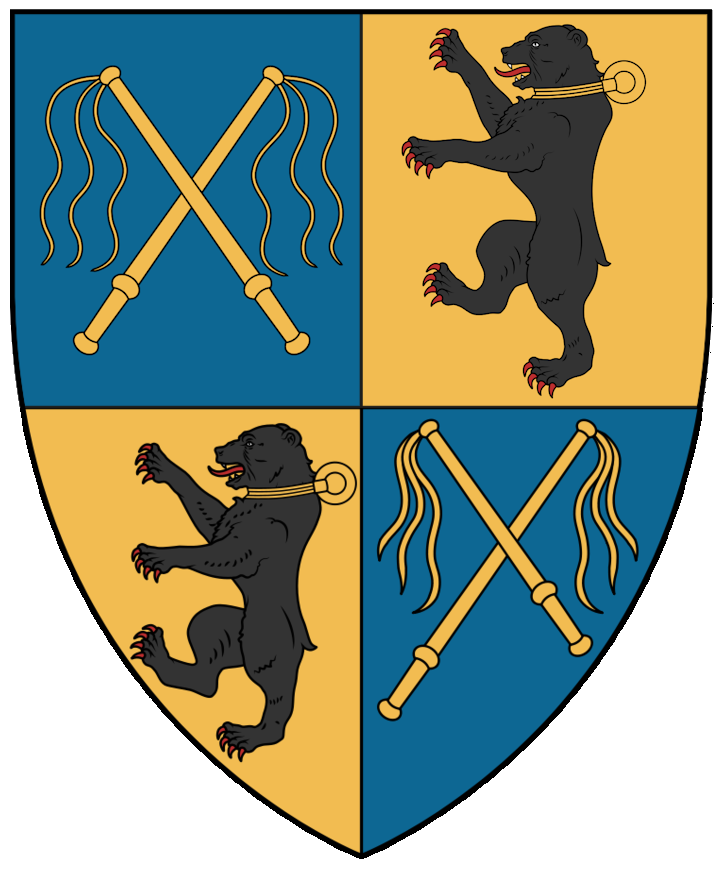
- Coat of Arms
- Country: Germany
- Founded: 15th century
- Founder: Hero of Dornum
- Final ruler: Onna of Esens
- Titles: Lord of Esens, Stedesdorf and Wittmund; Lord of Dornum
- Estates: Esens Castle; Wittmund Castle; Dornum-Norderburg; Dornum-Westerburg; Dornum-Osterburg
- Dissolution: c.1560

The Attena family is a former ruling family of East Frisian chieftains. They reigned over Lordships of Dornum and Nesse, located in Lower Saxony, in what is today Germany.

== History ==
It is unclear whether the origins of the Attena family lay in Norden or Dornum. However, the two branches must already have diverged during the thirteenth century.

The Attena family may have come to Norden through the marriage of one of its members to a daughter of the Idzinga family. Hylo Attena was the first member of the family known to have held public office in the Norderland during the period of the Frisian Freedom. Together with Martin Syertza (Cirksena) of Berum, he occupied and fortified the Dominican church at Norden. In 1367, he was mentioned, together with Evenardus Ytzengha and Martin Syertza, as one of the advocati terrae Nordensis ("advocates" or administrators of the land of Norden).

Toward the end of the fourteenth century, the consular constitution of the Frisian Freedom increasingly fell into decline. Taking advantage of this situation, several influential chieftain families established a new system of rule in which they exercised power as hovetlinge (also referred to in Latin as capitales) over territories of varying size. In the Norderland, it was the Cirksena and Attena families that competed for political dominance. Martin Syertza and Hylo Attena brought an end to the consular system in the region, and in 1367 they appeared for the first time in the documentary record with the title of capitales. Hylo was probably also responsible for constructing a stone house on what is now Osterstraße in Norden, which became the nucleus of the later Ennenburg.

Because of the family's connections with the Victual Brothers, the citizens of Hamburg, together with their ally Keno II tom Brok, destroyed the castle in 1408 and expelled the Attena family from Norden. They did not return until they emerged as leaders in the struggle against Focko Ukena, who had succeeded the tom Brok family and was striving to establish his supremacy over East Frisia.

In Dornum, the Attena family was traditionally regarded as descending from Hero Eylwerdessen (Olde Hero). It was the East Frisian chronicler Ubbo Emmius who, in the seventeenth century, was the first to refer to him as Hero Attena. The chieftains of Dornum themselves, however, never used the name Attena.

Their possessions in Dornum included the Westerburg, ownership of which was closely associated with the chieftainship of the village. The Norderburg probably originally belonged to another noble family and most likely came into the possession of the Attena through marriage. The castle at Nesse may likewise have entered the family's holdings in this way. It was probably owned by the tom Brok family and was transferred as part of the dowry of Ocka tom Brok, who married Lütet Attena. Their daughter Hebe inherited the castle at Nesse and married Uko, a son of Focko Ukena. They were the parents of the later Countess Theda. Another daughter, Etta, married Maurits Kankena of the Kankena family of Wittmund, through whom the Norderburg passed into the possession of the Kankena family.

Through a skilful marriage policy, the Attena remained one of the most influential noble families in East Frisia. Sibet of Dornum (Olde Sibet) (d. 1433), for example, married Frouwa of Manslagt, a daughter of Enno Edzardisna. Their son, Sibet Attena, became chieftain of Esens, Stedesdorf, and Wittmund in 1455, thereby establishing the Harlingerland as a unified lordship. He was the father of Hero Omken, who succeeded him as chieftain of the Harlingerland, and of Ulrich of Dornum, whose initiative in organizing the Oldersum Religious Colloquy played a decisive role in the rapid spread and establishment of the Protestant Reformation in East Frisia.

Balthasar of Esens, the son of Hero Omken, was the last chieftain of the Attena family. After his death, the Harlingerland passed to the County of Rietberg.

== Genealogy ==
Dornum-Westerburg:

1. Hero I (c. 1340 - c. 1410), chieftain of Dornum-Westerburg and Nesse
  1. Lütet I (c. 1365 - c. 1410), chieftain of Dornum-Norderburg and Nesse
    1. Heba Attena (c.1396 - 20 January 1449), married in 1425 with Uko Fockena, son of Focko Ukena. They had one daughter: Theda Ukena.
    2. Etta Attena (c. 1397 - 1485), married before 1435 with Mauritz Kankena
  2. Eger I (c. 1367 - 1467), chieftain of Dornum-Westerbug
    1. Hero I (c. 1375 - after 1400), chieftain of Dornum-Westerurg
    2. Hicko I (c. 1390 - unknown), chieftain of Dornum-Westerburg
  3. Enno I (after 1375 - unknown), chieftain of Dornum-Osterburg

Dornum-Osterburg:

1. Sybold Reynaldesna (c.1340 - unknown)
  1. Reynt Syboldisna (c. 1360 - after 1438)
  2. Sywart Syboldisna (c. 1360 - after 1438)
  3. Ennet Syboldisna (c. 1370 - after 1434), chieftain of Dornum-Osterburg
    1. Sibold I (c. 1400 - 1433), chieftain of Dornum-Osterburg
      1. Sibet I (c. 1425 - 1473), lord of Esens, Stedesdorf and Wittmund
        1. Hero I (c. 1455 - 1522), lord of Esens, Stedesdorf and Wittmund
          1. Balthasar I (after 1495 - 1540), lord of Esens, Stedesdorf and Wittmund
          2. Onna of Esens (c. 1498 - 1560), lady of Esens, Stedesdorf and Wittmund
        2. Ulrich I (c. 1466 - 1536), chieftain of Dornum-Westerburg

== Sources ==
- Almuth Salomon: Die Attena. In: Emder Jahrbuch für historische Landeskunde Ostfrieslands (Hrsg. Ostfriesische Landschaft Aurich). Band 83/2003. S. 7–25.

== See also ==
- List of counts of East Frisia
- County of East Frisia
- Lordships of Esens, Stedesdorf and Wittmund
