= Theda Ukena =

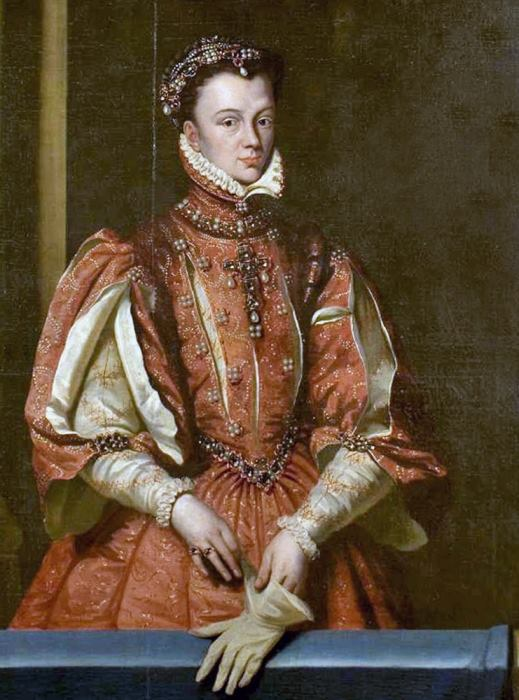
- Theda, Countess of East Frisia

Countess consort of East Frisia
- Reign: 1 October 1464 – 25/26 September 1466
- Predecessor: new creation
- Successor: Elisabeth of Rietberg

Countess of East Frisia (as regent)
- Reign: 25/26 September 1466 - 1480
- Predecessor: Ulrich I
- Successor: Enno I
- Born: 1432; Oldersum
- Died: 16 November 1494 (aged 61–62); Greetsiel
- Burial: Kloster Marienthal
- Spouse: Ulrich I, Count of East Frisia (m. 1455)
- Issue Detail: Heba of East Frisia; Gela of East Frisia; Enno I of East Frisia; Edzard I of East Frisia; Uko of East Frisia; Almuth of East Frisia
- House: Ukena
- Father: Uko Fockena
- Mother: Heba Attena

Theda Ukena (1432 in Oldersum – 16 November 1494 in Greetsiel) was from 1466 to about 1480 regent of the County of East Frisia.

== Biography ==
Born into House of Ukena, ruling family of Neermoor and Leer, Theda was the granddaughter and heiress of the chief Focko Ukena (died 1436) and was born in 1432 in Oldersum as the daughter of Uko Fockena, Governor of Oldersum, and his wife, Hebe Attena von Dornum (1396-1449) She was probably named after her grandmother Theda of Reide, the first wife of Focko Ukena. Her father was assassinated in June 1432.

In 1455 she was second wife of Ulrich I Cirksena, who had been Count of East Frisia since 1454. Between 1457 and 1465, they had six children: Heba, Gela, Enno I, Edzard I the Great, Uko and Almuth. Theda brought, among other claims, Oldersum into the marriage, which considerably weakened the ruling chief Wiard of Oldersum.

After Ulrich's death in 1466 she took over the official business of the house Cirksena. She was assisted by the chief Sibet Attena. She ruled until about 1480, when her sons Enno I and Edzard I came of age. Theda died on 16 November 1494, at the age of 62 in Greetsiel.

== Marriage and children ==
Ulrich I and Theda were married in 1455. They had seven children:

- Heba of East Frisia (1457-1476), married count Eric I of Schaumburg-Pinneberg,
- Gela of East Frisia (1458-1497)
- Enno I of East Frisia (1460-1491)
- Edzard I of East Frisia (1462-1528)
- Uko of East Frisia (1464-1507)
- Almuth of East Frisia (1465-1522/23)

== Ancestors ==
Ancestors of Theda Ukena

8. Uko Benen
4. Focko Ukena
9. Amke of Lengen
2. Uko Fockena
10. Ewo Tammena
5. Theda of Rheide
11. Bouwa Onsta
1. Theda Ukena
12. Hero Attena
6. Lütet Attena
13. Etta Ennosna
3. Heba Attena
14. Ocko I tom Brok
7. Ocka tom Brok
15. Foelke Kampana

== References and sources ==
- Walter Deeter Theda, in: Biographisches Lexikon für Ostfriesland
- Günther Möhlmann (1957). "Cirksena". Neue Deutsche Biographie (in German). Vol. 3. Berlin: Duncker & Humblot. pp. 255–256. (Family Cirksena Article)
- Günther Möhlmann (1959). "Edzard I the Great". Neue Deutsche Biographie (in German). Vol. 4. Berlin: Duncker & Humblot. pp. 317–318. (mention)
- Paul Wagner (1894). "Theda" . Allgemeine Deutsche Biographie (in German). Vol. 37. Leipzig: Duncker & Humblot. pp. 666–668.

Specific

Theda Ukena Cirksena Born: 1432 Died: 16 November 1494
Preceded by Ulrich I	Regent of East Frisia; 1466–1480	Succeeded by Enno I
