= Heba Attena =

East Frisian noblewoman (c. 1396–1449)

- Born: c. 1396; Dornum
- Died: 20 January 1449; Hinte
- Noble family: Attena-Westerburg
- Spouses: Uko Fockena; Haiko of Wynham
- Issue Detail: Theda Ukena; Ocko of Wynham; Keno of Wynham
- Father: Lütet Attena
- Mother: Ocka tom Brok

Heba Attena (c. 1396 in Dornum – 20 January 1449 in Hinte) was an East Frisian noblewoman and the daughter of East Frisian chieftain Lütet Attena. She was the mother of Theda Ukena, who later became the first Countess of East Frisia through her marriage to Ulrich I, Count of East Frisia.

== Life ==
Heba Attena was born around 1396 in Dornum as the daughter of the chieftain Lütet Attena of Dornum and his wife Ocka tom Brok. Through her mother, she was a granddaughter of the knight Ocko I tom Brok and a cousin of Ocko II tom Brok, the last chieftain of the tom Brok dynasty. Little is known about her childhood and early life. Her mother died when Heba was still an infant. Whether Ocka died of natural causes is unknown. According to later tradition, her early and unexpected death was attributed by some to her husband, who was alleged to have killed her. Lütet Attena was executed in 1410 or 1411, probably on the orders of Keno II tom Brok.

Between 1425 and 1427, Heba married Uko Fockena, the son of the chieftain Focko Ukena. At the time, Focko Ukena was still an ally of the tom Brok family, although he later became their principal rival. The couple's only documented child and heiress was Theda Ukena, who married Ulrich I of East Frisia in 1455. Ulrich served as Landeshovetling of East Frisia before becoming the first Count of East Frisia in 1464.

Following the Battle of the Wild Fields in 1427, Heba's cousin Ocko II tom Brok was imprisoned. After his release, probably in 1431 or 1432, he is believed to have lived with Heba.

On 13 June 1432, Heba's husband Uko Fockena was ambushed and killed in the marshes between Marienwehr and Suurhusen during the conflict between the Cirksena and their allies and the Ukena faction. He was buried in the nearby church at Hinte. Heba was unable to retain possession of Oldersum Castle. She subsequently married Haiko von Wynham of Rheiderland.

After Ocko II tom Brok died without political power in 1435, Heba asserted claims to the inheritance of the tom Brok family. She was eventually granted Hinte, the inheritance of her ancestress Foelke Kampana, in settlement of these claims. Her second husband thereafter styled himself chieftain of Hinte. In 1438, Haiko built a stone house on the site of Hinte Castle, which had been destroyed in 1435 during a Hanseatic punitive expedition against pirates. The present western wing of the castle incorporates part of this building.

Heba Attena died in Hinte on 20 January 1449. She was buried in the village church, where her tomb slab, commissioned by her daughter Countess Theda of East Frisia in the late 15th century, remains beneath the pulpit. It depicts the Apostles Peter and Paul.

== Marriage and children ==
She married in 1425 with Uko Fockena, son of Focko Ukena and had one daughter:

- Theda Ukena (1432–1494), married with Ulrich I of East Frisia

After the death of her first husband, she married with Haiko of Wynham and had two sons:

- Ocko of Wynham
- Keno of Wynham

== Ancestors ==
Ancestors of Heba Attena

4. Hero Attena
2. Lütet Attena
5. Etta Ennosna
1. Heba Attena
6. Ocko I tom Brok
3. Ocka tom Brok
7. Foelke Kampana

== Bibliography ==
- Hajo van Lengen: Die spätgotischen Bildnisgrabmäler der Heba Attena und des Uko Ukena und ihre politische Bedeutung. In: Emder Jahrbuch für historische Landeskunde Ostfrieslands, Bnd 80 (2001), 2000. S. 59–77
