= Loppersum (disambiguation) =

There are two places named Loppersum:

- Loppersum, Netherlands, a place and municipality in the province of Groningen, Netherlands
- Loppersum, Hinte, a place in the municipality of Hinte, East Frisia, Germany
