= Ulrich I of East Frisia =

Count of East Frisia

Ulrich I
- Count of East Frisia
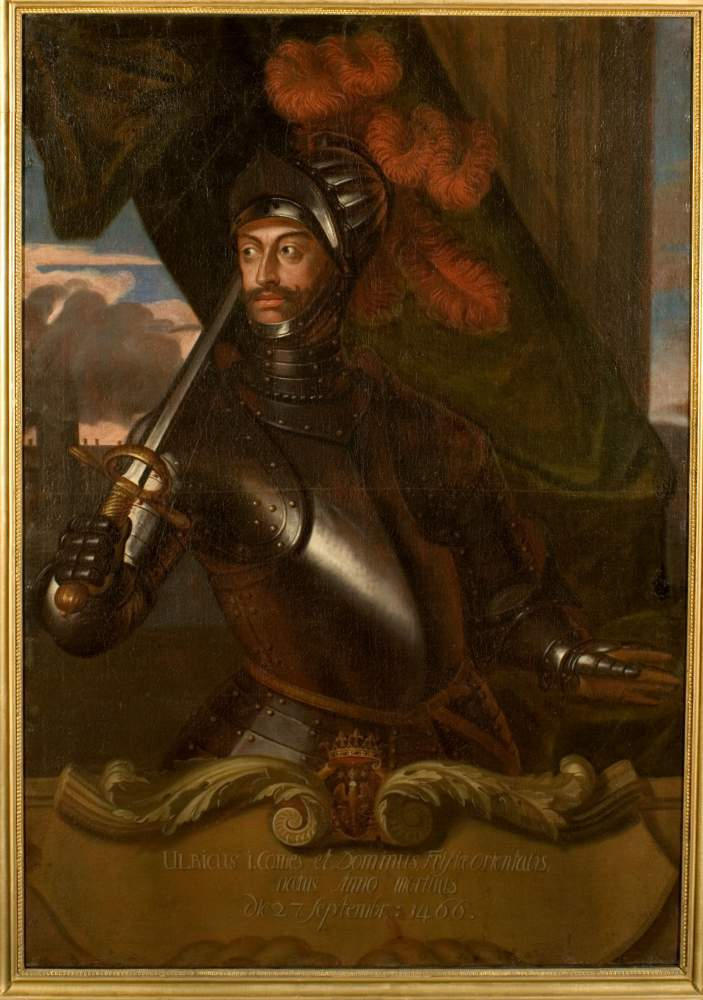
- Ulrich I, Count of East Frisia

Landeshovetling of East Frisia
- Reign: 1431 - 1 October 1464
- Predecessor: Focko Ukena
- Successor: Elevation to Imperial Count
- Alongside: Enno Edzardisna (1431–c.1450); Edzard Ennosna (1431-1441)

Count of Norden
- Reign: 14 June 1463 – 1 October 1464
- Successor: Norden incorporated into the county of East Frisia

Count of East Frisia
- Reign: 1 October 1464 – 25/26 September 1466
- Successor: Theda Ukena (as regent)
- Born: 1408; Norden, Lower Saxony, Germany
- Died: 25 or 26 September, 1466; Emden
- Burial: Kloster Marienthal
- Spouse: Foelke of Esens Theda Ukena (m. 1455)
- Issue Detail: Heba of East Frisia; Gela of East Frisia; Enno I of East Frisia; Edzard I of East Frisia; Uko of East Frisia; Almuth of East Frisia
- House: Cirksena
- Father: Enno Edzardisna
- Mother: Gela of Manslagt
- Religion: Catholicism

Ulrich I of East Frisia (c. 1408 in Norden – 25 or 26 September 1466 in Emden), also known as Ulrich Cirksena and Ulrich Ennosna, was an East Frisian chieftain who became the first Count of East Frisia in 1464 and the founder of the House of Cirksena. Through a combination of dynastic inheritance, legal claims, diplomacy, and political pragmatism, he united most of the East Frisian territories under his authority and transformed a fragmented network of autonomous chieftaincies into a territorially organised county within the Holy Roman Empire. Born into the Cirksena family of Greetsiel, Ulrich inherited extensive claims through both his paternal and maternal ancestry. Following the death of his half-brother Edzard in 1441, he became head of the family and gradually established himself as the dominant political figure in East Frisia. Rather than relying primarily on military conquest, he based his expansion on negotiated settlements, inheritance rights, judicial authority, and recognition by local communities, while carefully respecting traditional Frisian legal customs and liberties. As custodian of Hamburg's possessions in East Frisia and later as its principal ruler, Ulrich consolidated his position by restructuring local administration, strengthening judicial institutions, and acquiring hereditary claims from rival chieftain families. His marriage to Theda Ukena further reinforced his dynastic position by connecting the Cirksena to the influential Ukena family. On 1 October 1464, Frederick III, elevated Ulrich to the rank of Imperial Count and transformed his territories into the County of East Frisia, thereby granting imperial legitimacy to his rule while explicitly confirming the traditional liberties of the East Frisian lands. Historians generally regard this act as the constitutional foundation of the East Frisian county and the beginning of nearly three centuries of Cirksena rule. Ulrich died in 1466 and was succeeded by his underage son Enno I, with his widow Theda serving as regent. He is widely regarded as the founder of the East Frisian state and one of the most important political figures in the history of medieval Frisia.

== Biography ==
=== Early life ===
Ulrich descended from the chieftain family of Greetsiel. His father Enno Edzardisna had received the inheritance of the Attena of Norden that had fallen to him and thereby had become chieftain at Norden. His mother Gela was the daughter of Affo Beninga, chieftain at Pilsum and Manslagt, and of Tiadeka of Berum from the even more highly esteemed family of the "Tzyerza", that is, the original Cirksena dynasty. She was Enno's second wife, just as Enno was her second husband. After her only son from her first marriage, the chieftain Liudward Cirksena ("Syrtza") of Berum, had died childless in the middle of the 1430s, she and her niece Frauwa Cirksena ("Sydzena") remained the sole heirs of the Cirksena of Berum. Enno thereupon married his son from his first marriage, Ulrich's half-brother Edzard Ennosna, to Frauwa, and both adopted the family name of their wives. Whereas Gela had already brought her husband Enno the chieftainship of Pilsum and Manslagt through her paternal Beninga inheritance between 1404 and 1408, Edzard now received Berum through his wife Frauwa. Only when Edzard and Frauwa died in 1441 without leaving children did Ulrich become the principal heir of the Cirksena of Berum as well; and he likewise retained this family name. In view of the great importance that this family evidently possessed, the so-called Manslagt coat of arms, which the East Frisian counts incorporated into their territorial coat of arms alongside those of the tom Brok and the Ukena, is therefore likely to have been that of the Cirksena of Berum. For Gela was referred to in tradition (probably after her dowry) as "of Manslagt".

Ulrich first appeared in a political capacity in 1430 (together with his father and his older half-brother Edzard). Ulrich was probably brought up first in Norden and Manslagt (or Larrelt), and later in Greetsiel, for after his uncle Haro, chieftain at Greetsiel, had died without children, his father inherited this ancestral castle. He then witnessed the growing opposition among the East Frisians against Ocko II tom Brok, led by Focko Ukena and his sons, a movement which Ulrich's father Enno also joined. It led in 1427 to the overthrow of the rule of the tom Brok, but, to their disappointment, the East Frisians did not regain the traditional liberties for which they had taken the field against the modern exercise of lordly authority. Instead, the chieftainships of the Ukena and their allies arose anew. The peasants, who had taken up arms less for the restoration of the sovereignty of the chieftains than for the freedom of the common people, felt betrayed and, now led by the Cirksena, turned their anger against the new old rulers. A complete victory over the Ukena and their allies, however, still required additional forces: the city of Hamburg. In 1433, by capturing Emden and winning the battle near Norden (Bargebur), it finally secured victory for the East Frisian League of Freedom, but at the same time this marked the beginning of the end of the Frisian dream of freedom. The price of this security was the occupation of Emden and southern East Frisia by the Hamburgers. It taught the East Frisians that without feudalism, and without power the law, freedom could not endure. This experience, which soon came to be generally accepted, greatly strengthened the position of the Cirksena, who for their part had learned from the past that the establishment and exercise of power and rule in violation of the East Frisians' sense of justice and love of freedom were ultimately doomed to failure. Thus the territorial communities once again entrusted the Cirksena and their closest allies with rule over themselves—in the confidence that through them a regime of arbitrary rule in the old style would not return, and probably also out of fear that otherwise they might fall under foreign rule. They found that possibility even more objectionable.

=== Consolidation of power ===
In 1439, Hamburg entrusted its rule in East Frisia to the two Cirksena brothers for safekeeping. For the Hanseatic city, as for the East Frisian territories, it was only advantageous that there should be no sole ruler here, although from 1440 onwards Edzard concentrated on Emden and the Norderland, while Ulrich concentrated on Esens and the Auricherland; moreover, in their dealings with Hamburg they had no hesitation in calling themselves (unlawfully) chieftains at Emden.

But an unforeseen event upset this arrangement of divided authority: Edzard and his wife, still childless, were carried off by an epidemic in 1441, so that the entire responsibility suddenly fell upon Ulrich alone. Only then could it become apparent what he was capable of, and whether the expectations that his father-in-law Wibet had placed in him as heir to the Harlingerland could also be fulfilled by him for the rest of East Frisia. Ulrich, who from 1444 onwards also called himself Chieftain in East Frisia, left no doubt that he intended to secure his rule in East Frisia. He avoided violence and arbitrariness and observed law and custom. This prudent consideration for the pronounced sense of justice of the East Frisians, and his convincing conduct in showing that he was serious about it, greatly strengthened their confidence in him and thereby his authority.

But Ulrich also became increasingly active on his own initiative as custodian of Hamburg's ru.e in East Frisia. Not only did it attract attention that in 1442 he helped the community of Emden to obtain a municipal council constitution and began the expansion of the castle after its last hereditary chieftain, Imel Abdena, had died while imprisoned in Hamburg, but also, and especially, that Ulrich had the frontier fortress of Detern rebuilt with the support of at least the territorial community of Lengen, which was a clear indication of his own independent will. Unlike the East Frisians, with whom he could assume himself to be in agreement, the Hamburgers could neither accept nor tolerate this, for they were bound to interpret his conduct as estrangement from them. They therefore returned to Emden in 1447 and once again took their East Frisian rule into their own hands. Ulrich raised no objections to this, but submitted himself to the legal right that Hamburg indeed possessed to do so.

Although Ulrich had returned to the Hamburgers the rule that he had held in safekeeping for them, he was by no means willing to confine himself solely to the expansion of his rule over the other part of East Frisia. He now made use of the pressure exerted by the exiled chieftains for their return, acting as their advocate, as well as of the deeply rooted antipathy of the East Frisians towards foreign rule, while avoiding any open breach of law or unjustified use of force against the Hamburgers. Only when they refused to reimburse his expenses, especially those incurred in rebuilding Detern Castle, did Ulrich obtain the welcome pretext for yielding to the demands of the East Frisians and driving the Hamburgers out of East Frisia. At the end of this conflict, Hamburg was forced to admit defeat and in 1453 restored rule to Ulrich. Although victorious, Ulrich had to pay dearly for this. The city pledged its rule to Ulrich for 10,000 marks, received homage from him and from his closest relatives—his nephew Sibet Attena and his brother-in-law Lutet Manninga—and furthermore reserved to itself important political rights and economic liberties, particularly with regard to the construction and expansion of castles (which Ulrich continued at Emden in 1458) and especially the importation of beer. However, it was only after sixteen years that the city was able to redeem this pledge, so that Ulrich at least gained sufficient time gradually and noticeably to strengthen his position. In a realistic assessment of the balance of power, he preferred to employ diplomatic rather than military means to achieve this.

=== Establishing a legal basis for rule ===
The establishment of the legal basis of his rule was particularly complicated, since the territorial community here did not constitute a single unit, but rather consisted entirely of parish communities with their own chieftains, most of whom had moreover been driven into exile. They were united only by the prevailing Emsiger Land Law; and in this Ulrich saw a great opportunity. He established, in agreement with his relatives and allies, a new institution in the Emsigerland that was binding upon everyone (including himself): that of the two Land Judges. By means of this institution, and by gradually turning them into his own officials, Ulrich subsequently took possession of judicial authority in the Emsigerland and thereby deprived the other chieftains and lords of their power, since the former judicial office, as an essential component of his rule, had henceforth become superfluous for the chieftains. By law, they could now claim only their hereditary property as a legitimate right; and Ulrich could neither nor wished any longer to dispute this. In return for acknowledging his supremacy (as, for example, Redert Beninga of Groothusen did in 1442), he promised to support them against Hamburg in this respect, while, on the other hand, as administrator of Hamburg's rule, he also carefully respected Hamburg's claims against the exiled chieftains.

The security of Ulrich's ru.e over the other East Frisian territories was likewise threatened by the law of inheritance, since descendants of the chieftains who had formerly ruled there could assert an equal or even better right, or an exclusive right, on that basis. In return for appropriate compensation and indemnification, Ulrich therefore obtained legally binding transfers of their hereditary claims from the descendants of the Idzinga of Norden (such as the Kankena in 1442), of the tom Brok (such as the Allena in 1449 and the Addinga in 1453), and of the Abdena of Emden (the chieftains Abeko of Loppersum and Gerd of Petkum in 1460, as well as Eggo Addinga in 1466), as well as from relatives of his cousin of Eilsum in 1445. In the case of the chieftains of Loquard, who, as the nearest descendants and rightful heirs, also called themselves "tom Brok", Ulrich therefore had to accept a compromise whereby they were at least permitted to exercise certain rights of rule themselves in Loquard, Campen, and Rysum. With regard to the hereditary right to Esens and the lordship over the Harlingerland deriving from it, Ulrich, in accordance with a testamentary disposition, renounced this claim in the spring of 1454 in favour of Onna, Foelke Wibet's daughter from her first marriage, and of his nephew Sibet Attena, who was married to her. In return, Sibet renounced his maternal inheritance in favour of Ulrich and furthermore promised him that his heirs (as he himself) would be "faithful and loyal" to Ulrich and his heirs.

=== Marriage, dynastic policy, and the comital title ===
After the death of his first wife, Ulrich married again, this time a woman considerably younger than himself; and the choice he made was entirely in keeping with his dynastic policy aimed at establishing territorial rule. She was Theda, twenty-one years of age, the granddaughter of Focko Ukena, who had once ruled the whole of southern East Frisia. On 1 June 1455, the Sunday after Pentecost, this marriage was concluded and the wedding celebrated at Berum Castle. Theda brought with her the hereditary right to Oldersum, whose chieftain had been her father Uko, and which was now counted by Wiard of Uphusen as part of his rule of the Oberemsigerland. This placed in Ulrich's hands a legal instrument by which he was able to weaken Wiard, who occupied a position independent of Ulrich and therefore legally equal to him. Wiard was now obliged, in order to retain Oldersum, to cede Faldern, with which he intended to compete with Emden, to Ulrich and Theda; but this was not all. By granting a local right of rule, Ulrich enabled the chieftain Gerd, at Wiard's expense, to enforce his claim to Petkum; in return, Gerd renounced his claim to Emden in favour of Ulrich. Ulrich then granted Wiard possession of the castles of Jarssum and Widdelswehr, which had been bequeathed to him by their last chieftain.

Ulrich was by no means satisfied with the contractual arrangements governing the relationship of rule between Hamburg and himself in East Frisia, but made every effort to weaken and abolish them in order to be able to rule there unrestrictedly and permanently. The acquisition of legal titles securing the succession to the Abdena of Emden and the Ukena of Leer was an important instrument of this policy—even in relation to the East Frisians. So that no one might accuse him of violating either law or treaty, he successfully sought in 1461 to obtain from the Holy See a release for himself and his two relatives from the oath that they had formerly sworn to Hamburg. What he naturally preferred was an explicit renunciation by Hamburg itself, concerning which he had already begun negotiations. The Hamburgers, however, apparently rejected the idea at once, so that their rule with regard to Emden, Leer, and their surrounding districts continued to hang over him. Ultimately, Ulrich required, in many respects, a higher and more comprehensive legal title in order to establish an unassailable territorial rule of his own. He therefore sought for himself and his house elevation to comital rank, and for his rule conversion into a county held as a fief of the Empire.

The desired elevation was achieved at the first attempt only for his own principal rule of Norden, but at the second attempt, in 1464, also for the other territories that he by then ruled and possessed, including expressly Emden and "Emesgonien". He was also able to obtain formal confirmation of a claim to rule over East Frisia "as far as the Weser", thereby clearly revealing his more far-reaching political ambitions and dynastic aspirations. Since the feudal charter listed only the castles possessed by Ulrich and, apart from "Emesgonien", mentioned no territorial names, the Emperor and the Empire evidently regarded the hereditary rights that Ulrich could demonstrably assert as the decisive legal basis for protection and rule. Thus, all the "liberties and rights" that had been granted to the "common lands of East Frisia" by Charlemagne and subsequent emperors and kings, most recently by Frederick III himself, expressly remained untouched. Just as Ulrich, as an Imperial Count, was obliged to preserve these privileges, so the East Frisians were obliged to render him homage in that capacity.

=== Imperial recognition and Ulrich's final years ===
The Emperor sought to regulate the relationship of his new vassal to the other East Frisian chieftains who had remained independent by issuing mandates to them, requiring that they, for their part, receive their "jurisdiction and rights" as fiefs from Ulrich and his heirs. This the descendants and heirs of Wiard of Uphusen indeed did, but not the chieftain of Jever, nor the chieftain of Friedeburg. The remaining chieftains, who had already submitted themselves to him as territorial chieftain, now likewise rendered him formal homage as Imperial Count. No written record has survived either of an enfeoffment or of homage by his nephew Sibet Attena of Esens and Stedesdorf or by the Manninga of Pewsum and Lütetsburg, nor was such a formal act probably considered appropriate in their case. They nevertheless rendered him homage in every respect, as Sibet himself expressly stated, and he was regarded at the imperial court as a "holder of a fief". However, the absence of a written definition of their relationship to the Count—neither required nor demanded because of their particularly close personal ties—remained a weakness for the future.

The creation of the Imperial County of East Frisia represented the elevation and thereby the safeguarding of the territorial rule as Ulrich rightfully and in fact possessed it, as well as the legitimisation under imperial law of an overlordship over the other chieftains in the remaining East Frisian coastal region. It protected Ulrich against territorial encroachment by the Bishop of Münster by surpassing his claim: Ulrich's new county prevented the old county of the Bishop of Münster from taking effect. But Ulrich also wished to rid himself of Hamburg's claims to overlordship and to bring his dynastic policy to complete success. To achieve this, he first had to obtain something with which he could strike the Hamburgers where it would truly hurt. He succeeded in doing so by obtaining from the Emperor the right to levy customs duties on foreign beer imported into his territory. And indeed, this immediately brought the Hamburgers into action and set negotiations in motion. Ulrich did not live to see their conclusion, but by the end of the fifteenth century his son Edzard I succeeded in bringing both the city of Hamburg and the Bishop of Münster to abandon the renewal of their claims to rule, not least because they were persuaded by financial compensation.

The imperial charter of enfeoffment issued at Wiener Neustadt is dated 1 October 1464. Four days later, a further imperial charter was issued there by which Ulrich and twenty-one other Frisians were raised to the rank of knight. These acts were carried out on Sunday, 23 December 1464, in the Franciscan church at Emden before an assembly of East Frisians. Ulrich took the oath of fealty there; at the same time he and his nephew Sibet Attena were dubbed knights. The charters relating to these acts were then issued at Emden Castle on the same day. The assembled East Frisians probably rendered general homage on this occasion. Ulrich deliberately chose the Franciscan church as the place where these events took place, for it had been there that the Westphalian counts had had their seat during the High Middle Ages. It could scarcely have been demonstrated more clearly that this was also intended as a renewal of the old county of the Empire, that an established tradition was being taken up rather than something new being created. Thus, this too ultimately represented the restoration of good old law.

=== Death ===
When Ulrich died at almost sixty years of age, he left behind a widow of thirty-two with six young children, the youngest, his daughter Almuth, only one year old. The two eldest children were also daughters: Heba, born on 18 November 1456 (or 1457), and Gela, born on 9 February 1458 (or 1459). They were followed by the three sons: Enno, born on 1 July 1460, Edzard, born on 15 January 1462, and Uko, born on 1 April 1464. With the assistance of Sibet Attena, who also received the imperial enfeoffment on behalf of Ulrich's three underage sons, and of the Manninga as guardians, Countess Theda succeeded to Ulrich's inheritance as regent.

== Marriage and children ==
Ulrich and his second wife, Theda, had the following children:

- Heba of East Frisia (1457-1476), married count Eric I of Schaumburg-Pinneberg,
- Gela of East Frisia (1458-1497),
- Enno I of East Frisia (1460-1491),
- Edzard I of East Frisia (1462-1528),
- Uko of East Frisia (1464-1507),
- Almuth of East Frisia (1465-1522).

== Ancestors ==
Ancestors of Ulrich I of East Frisia

8. Enno II Edzardisna
4. Edzard II Ennosna
9. Adda Beninga
2. Enno III Edzardisna
10. Keno I tom Brok
5. Doda tom Brok
11. Ocka of Nesse
1. Ulrich I, Count of East Frisia
12. Folkard Beninga
6. Affo Beninga
13. Frouwa of Manslagt
3. Gela Beninga
14. Merten Sydzena
7. Tiadeke Mertens Sydzena

== See also ==
- House of Cirksena
- County of East Frisia
- List of counts of East Frisia

Ulrich I of East Frisia Cirksena Born: circa 1408 Died: c. 26 September 1466
Preceded by new creation	Count of East Frisia; 1464–1466	Succeeded by Enno I
