= Edzard Cirksena =

German nobleman

Edzard Ennosna

Landeshovetling of East Frisia
- Reign: 1431 - 1441
- Predecessor: Focko Ukena
- Successor: Enno Edzardisna; Ulrich Ennosna
- Alongside: Enno Edzardisna (1431–1441); Ulrich Ennosna (1431-1441)
- Died: 1441
- Spouse: Frauwa Cirksena
- House: Cirksena
- Father: Enno Edzardisna

Edzard Cirksena (born: Edzard Ennosna; died: 1441) was an East Frisian chieftain at Greetsiel, Norden, Emden and Brokmerland.

He and his father Enno Edzardisna had married the last two heiresses of the great family of Syardsna from Berum; Edzard married Frauwa Cirksena; his father married her aunt Gela Cirksena. Enno and Edzard adopted their wives' family name, which was also spelled Sirtzena, Syrtza, or Zyertza. Edzard was probably the first to spell the name as Cirksena; this spelling was retained by all later members of the family.

From his father he inherited the reign over almost all of East Frisia, albeit without the Harlingerland.

He died at an advanced age, of the plague, in 1441, one day after his stepmother Gela died.
