= Leaning Tower of Suurhusen =

Leaning tower in East Frisia, Germany

Suurhusen Church
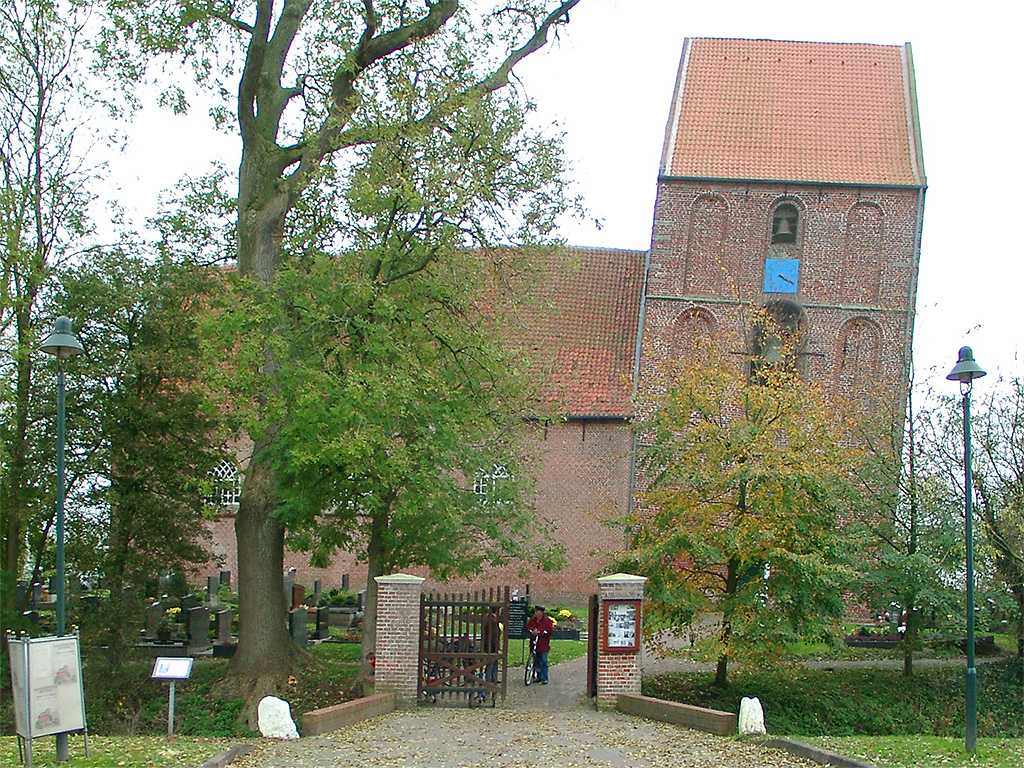
- Side view of the Suurhusen Church

Religion
- Affiliation: Evangelical Reformed Church
- District: Aurich
- Year consecrated: 14th century

Location
- Location: Suurhusen, Germany
- Interactive map of Suurhusen Church
- Coordinates: 53°24′48″N 7°13′24″E

Architecture
- Type: Church
- Style: Gothic (Brick Gothic)
- Completed: 1450 (tower)

Specifications
- Height (max): 27.37 metres (89.8 ft)
- Materials: Brick

Website
- www.kirche-suurhusen.de

The Leaning Tower of Suurhusen (German: Schiefer Turm von Suurhusen) is a late medieval steeple in Suurhusen, a village in the East Frisian region of northwestern Germany. According to the Guinness World Records it was at one time the most tilted tower in the world, although intentionally inclined towers such as the Montreal Tower far surpass it. The Suurhusen steeple as of 2007 claimed to be the unintentionally tilted tower with the greatest angle of lean in the world, 1.22° more than the Leaning Tower of Pisa.

== History ==
The Brick Gothic church in Suurhusen is reminiscent of the old fortress churches. Originally, it was 32 m (105 ft) long and 9.35 m (30.7 ft) wide. In 1450 the church was shortened by about a quarter and the tower was built in the space. The tower leans at an angle of 5.19° (5° 11′), compared with 3.97° (3° 58′) for the Pisa tower after its stabilisation.

According to local historian Tjabbo van Lessen, the church was built in the Middle Ages in marshy land on foundations of oak tree trunks which were preserved by groundwater. When the land was drained in the 19th century, the wood rotted, causing the tower to tilt. The steeple was closed to the public in 1975 for safety reasons, and re-opened 10 years later after it was stabilised.

== Data ==
- Area: 121 square metres (1,300 sq ft), 11 m × 11 m (36 ft × 36 ft)
- Height: 27.37 metres (89.8 ft)
- Overhang: 2.47 metres (8.1 ft)
- Foundation: 2-metre-thick (6.6 ft) masonry, resting on oak piles
- Total weight: 2,116 t (2,332 short tons)

== Gallery ==
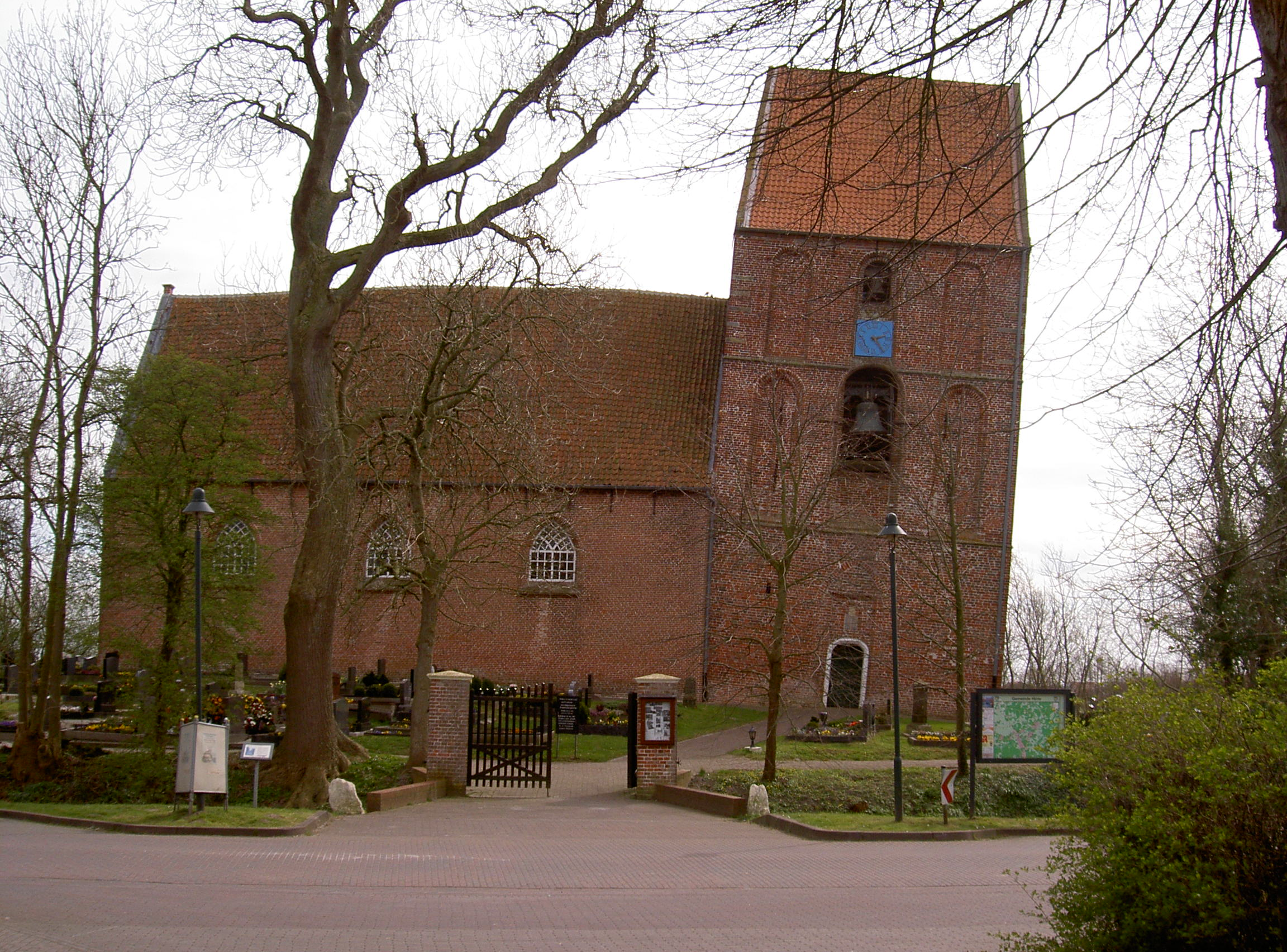
Side view

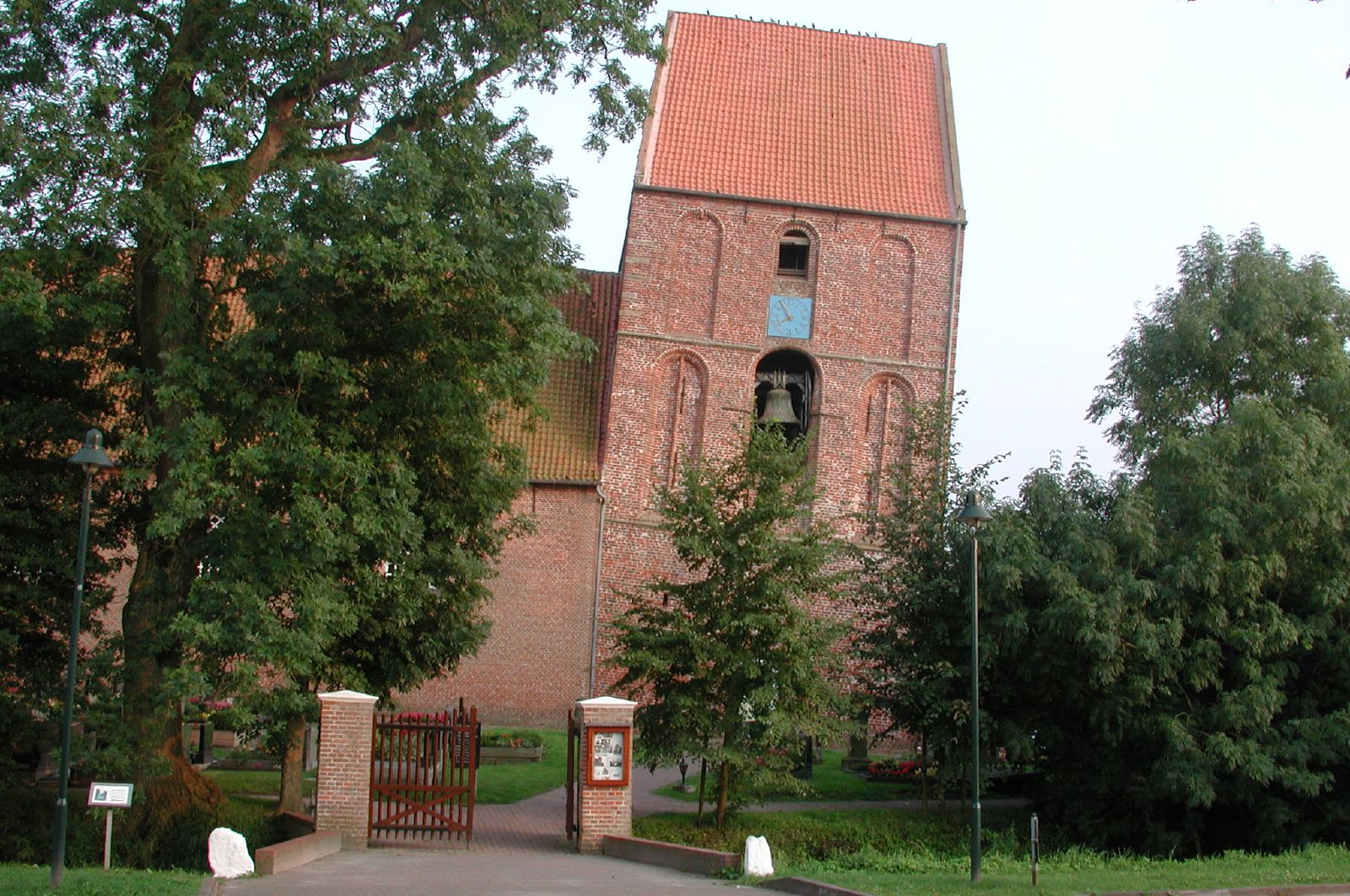
Side view

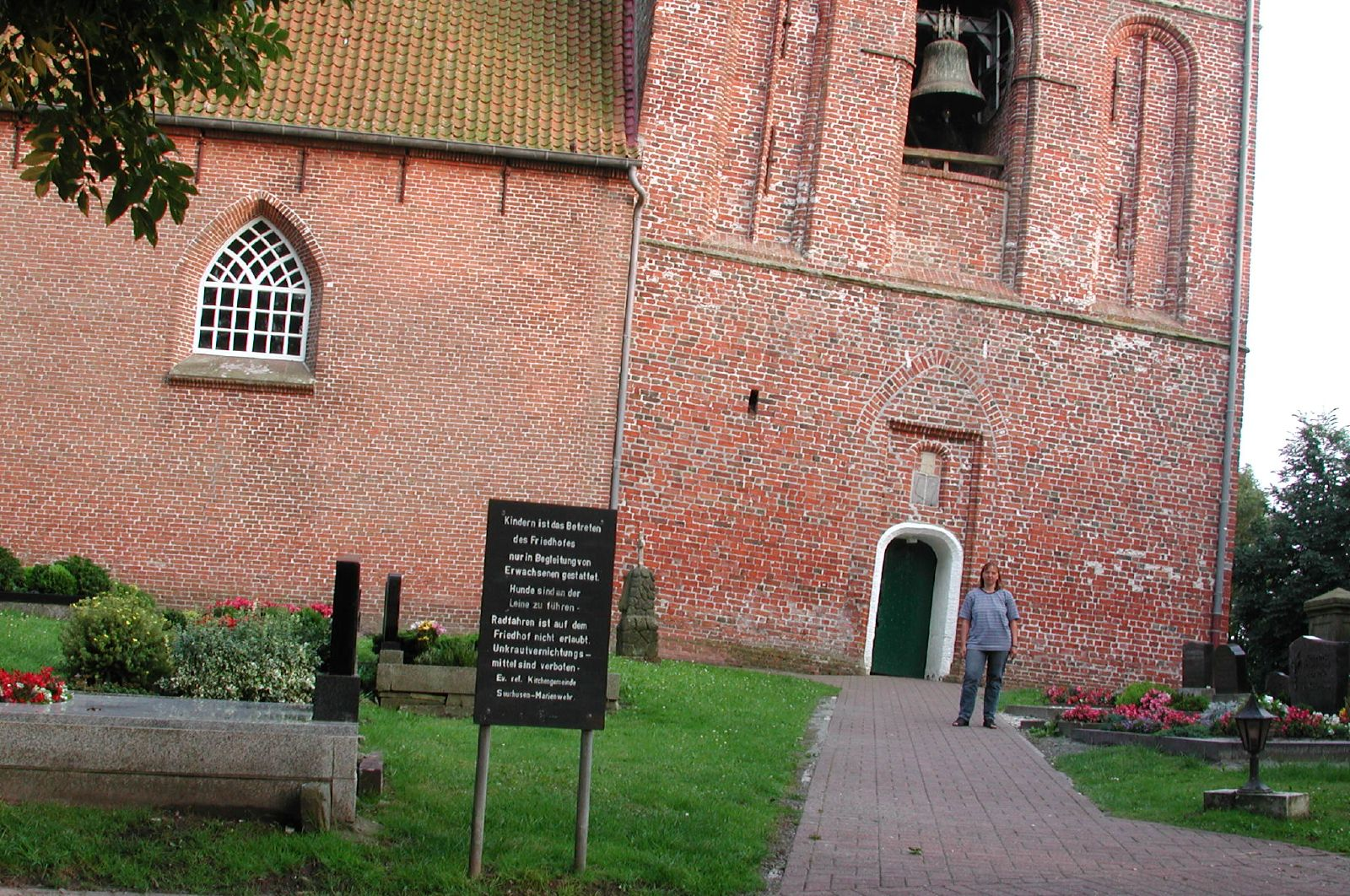
Entrance to tower

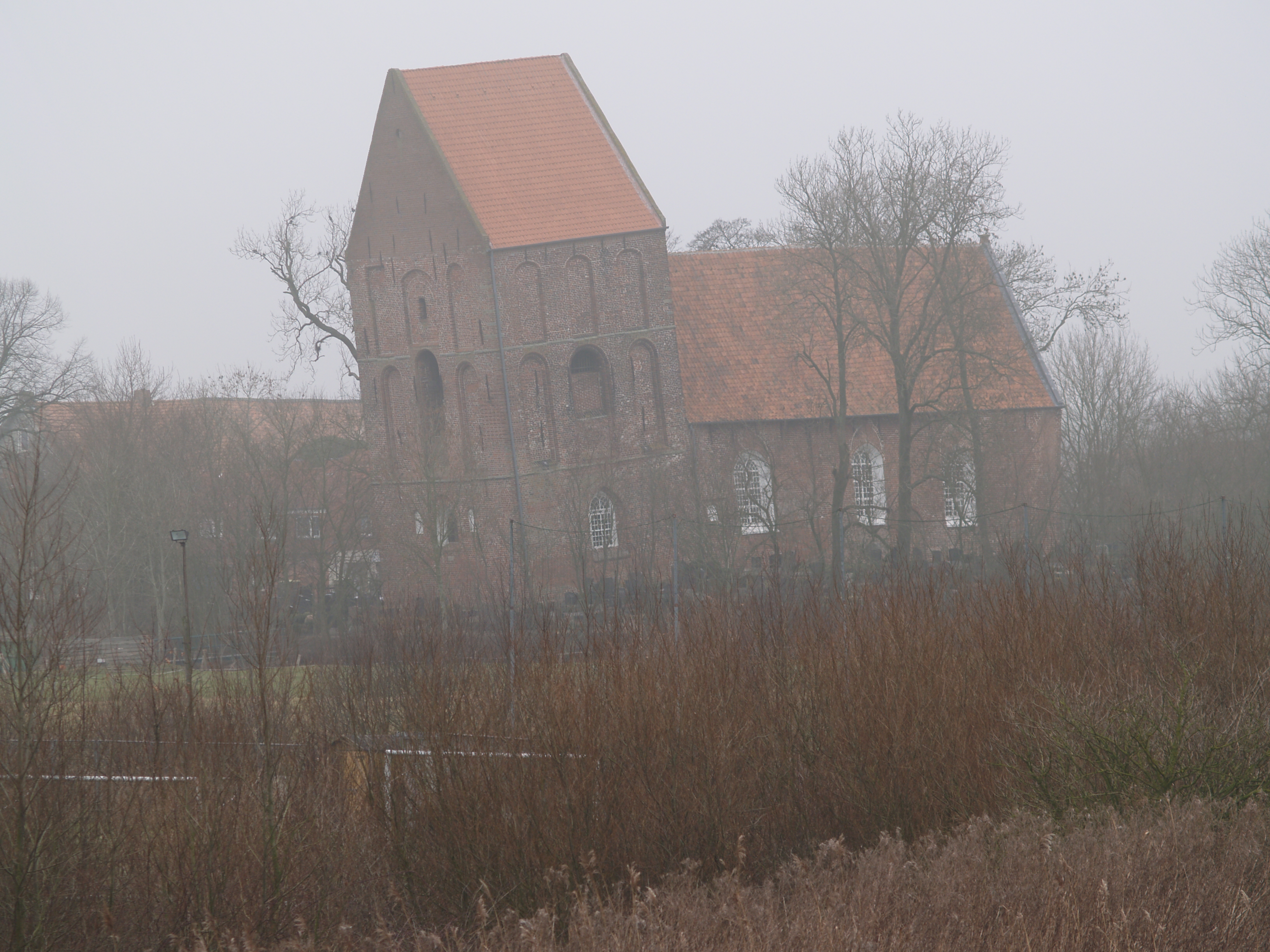
View from the east

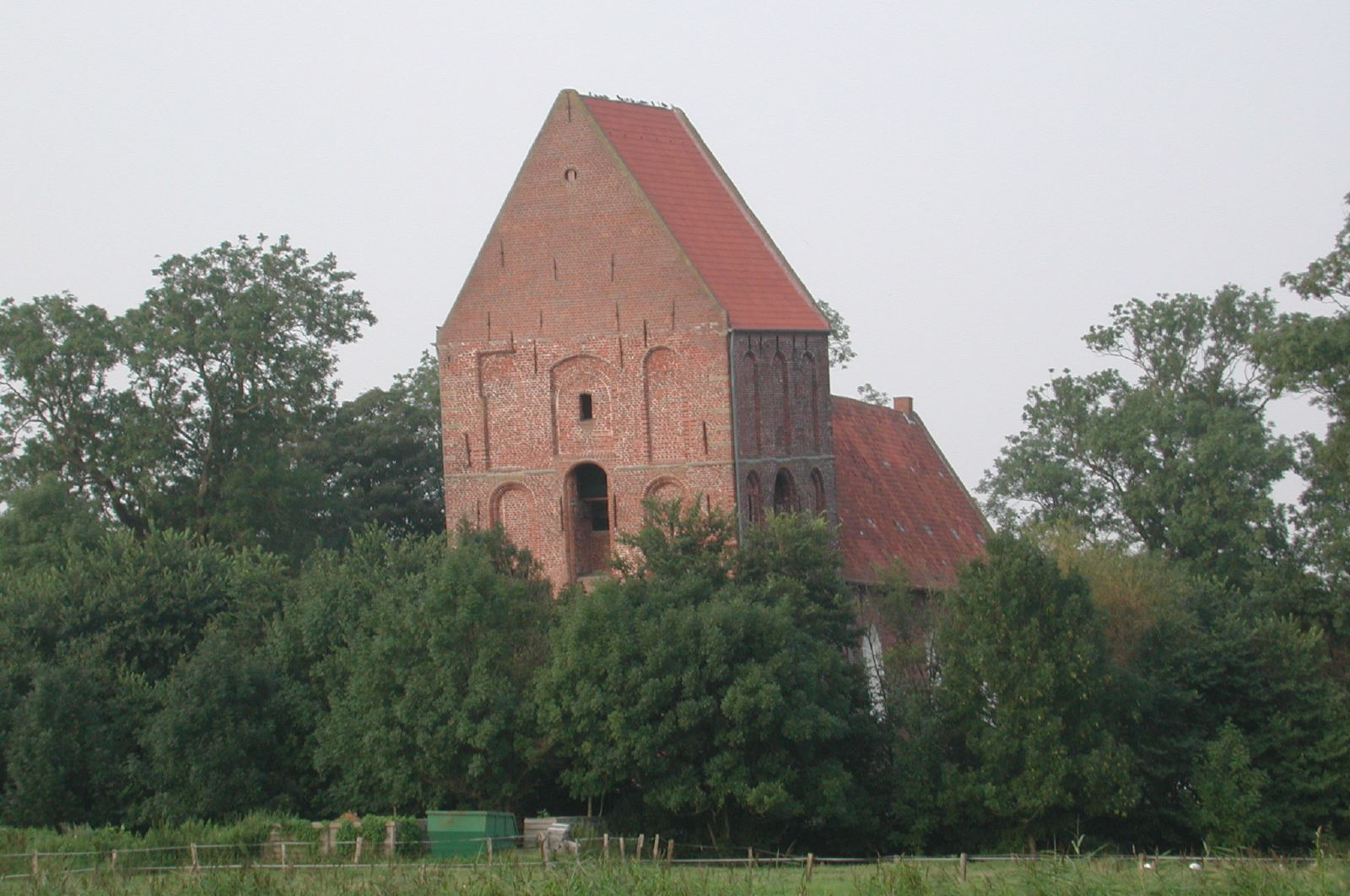

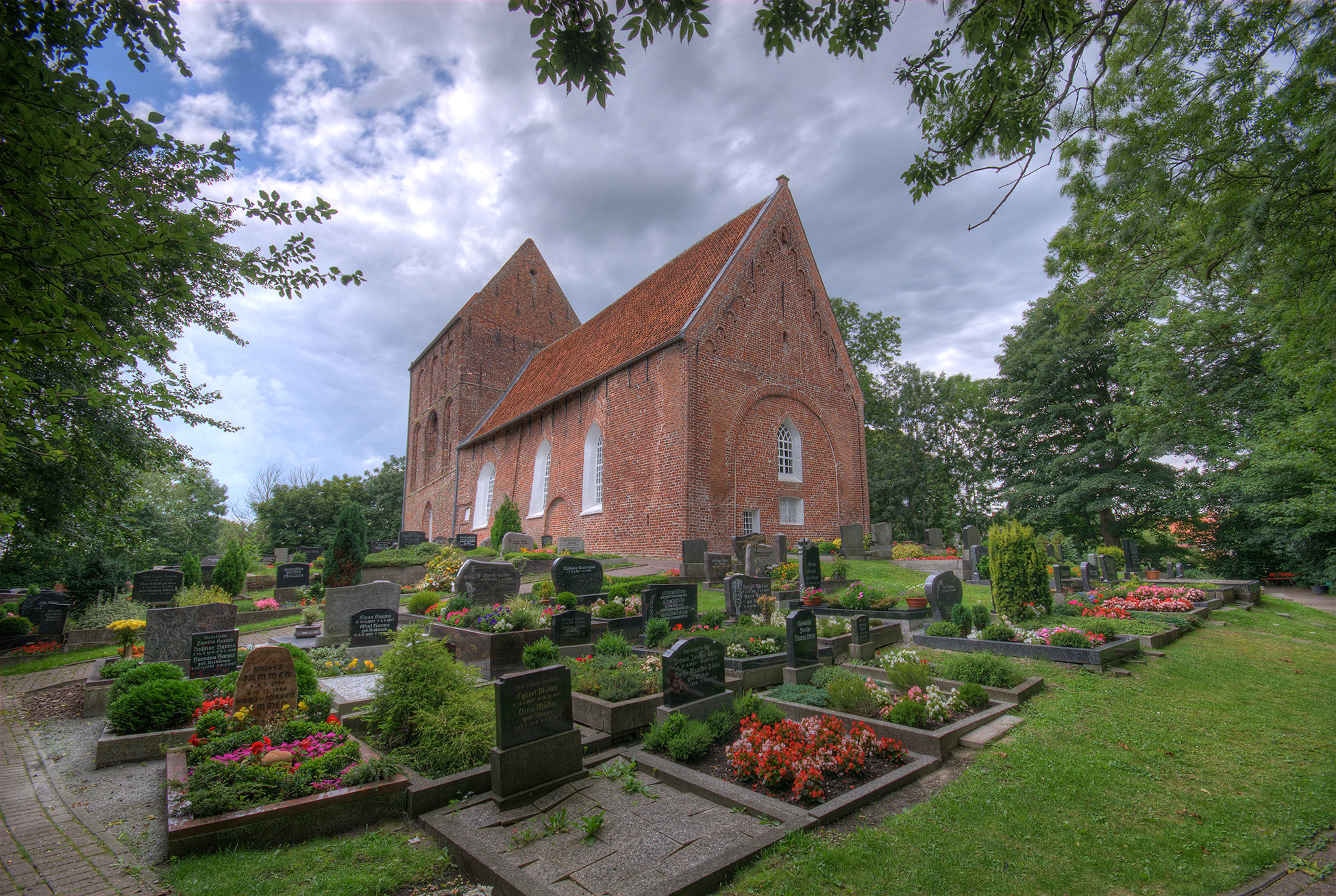
Rear view with cemetery

== See also ==
- List of leaning towers
- Oberkirche of Bad Frankenhausen
