= Suurhusen =

- Ortsteil of Hinte
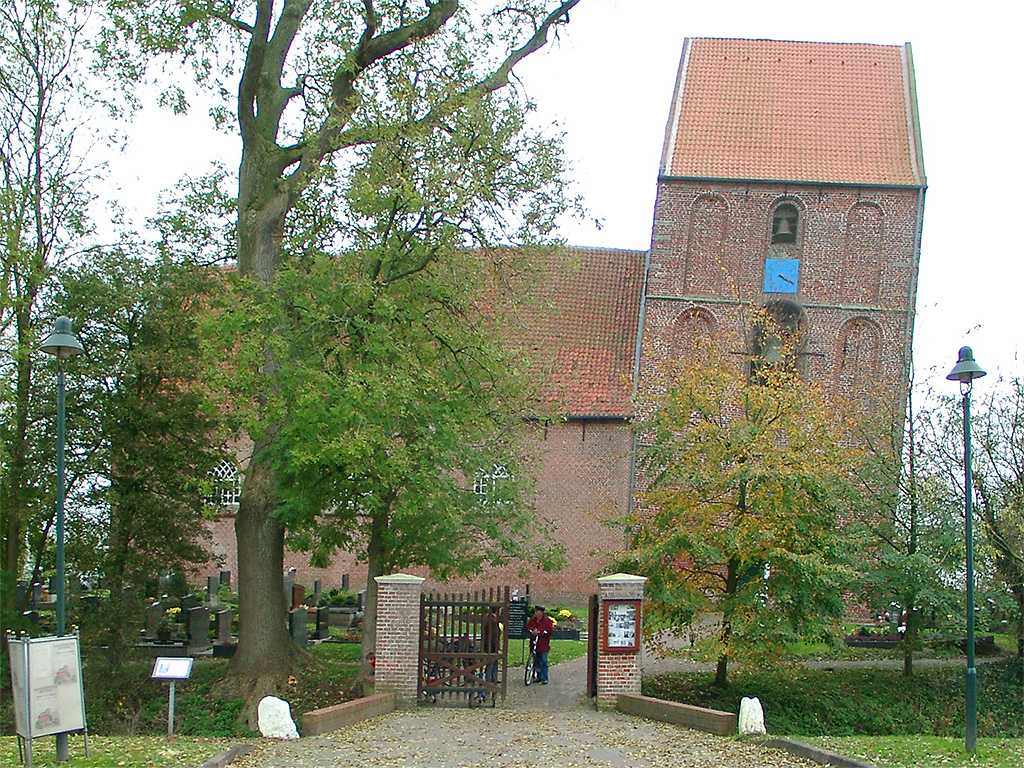
- The Leaning Tower of Suurhusen

- Coat of arms
- Interactive map of Suurhusen
- Location within Germany Location within Lower Saxony
- Coordinates: 53°24′N 7°13′E
- Country: Germany
- State: Lower Saxony
- District: Aurich
- Municipality: Hinte

Population (2020)
  - Total: 1,113
- Time zone: UTC+01:00 (CET)
  - Summer (DST): UTC+02:00 (CEST)

Suurhusen is a village north of Emden in the German region of East Frisia. It has about 1,100 inhabitants and is administered by the municipality of Hinte. The steeple of the Suurhusen church, inclined at an angle of 5.19 degrees, is the most leaning tower of the world, beating the Leaning Tower of Pisa by 1.22 degrees.

The settlement was first mentioned in documents from 1255 and in former times was also called Zuiderhusen ("Southern Husen"), most likely due to close proximity of Osterhusen and Westerhusen. However, a stone with the year 1004 and ceramic objects found in the old church tower point to the fact that the village is much older.

In the village centre is a small museum in which the life of an agricultural worker's family is illustrated.
