= Westerhusen =

- Village of Hinte
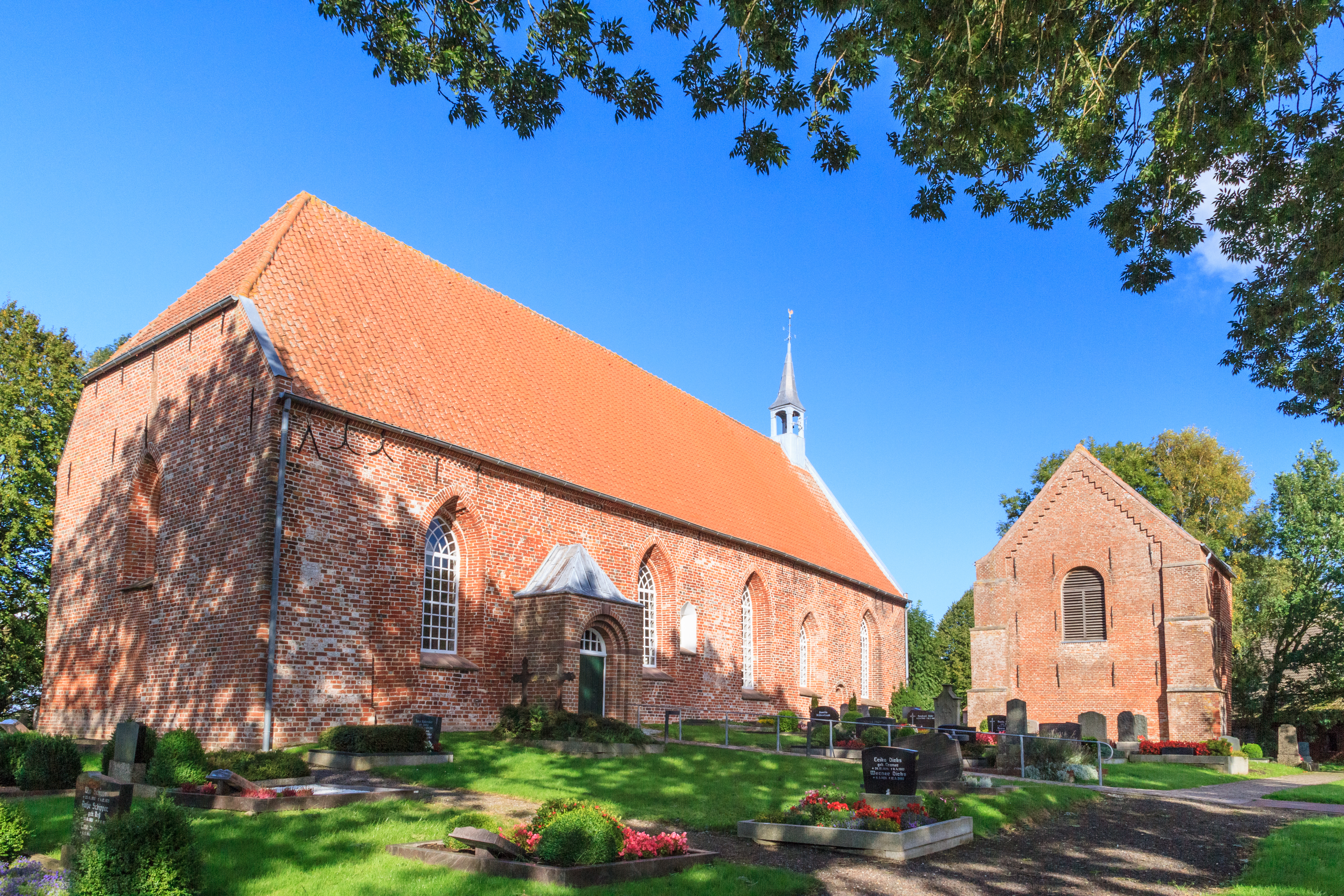
- Church of Westerhusen

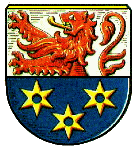
- Coat of arms
- Interactive map of Westerhusen
- Location within Germany Location within Lower Saxony
- Country: Germany
- State: Lower Saxony
- District: Aurich
- Municipality: Hinte
- Elevation: 5.2 m (17 ft)

Population
  - Metro: 320
- Time zone: UTC+01:00 (CET)
  - Summer (DST): UTC+02:00 (CEST)
- Postal codes: 26759
- Dialling codes: 04925

Westerhusen is a village in the region of East Frisia, in Lower Saxony, Germany. Administratively, it is an Ortsteil of the municipality of Hinte, of which it is located to the southwest. Westerhusen is about 5 kilometers to the north of Emden.

The Church of Westerhusen from the 15th century is located in the middle of the warft on which the village is built. The church had a Romanesque predecessor from the 13th century. The church organ in this building dates from 1643.
