= Rudolph Cirksena =

Illegitimate son of Count Enno I of East Frisia

- Born: c. 1490
- Died: 15 March 1533
- Noble family: Cirksena (illegitimate)
- Spouse: Gebke Vlaßkooper
- Father: Enno I of East Frisia

Rudolph Cirksena (c. 1490 – 15 March 1533) was an illegitimate member of the House of Cirksena who served as a senior official in the County of East Frisia. According to the East Frisian historian Tileman Dothias Wiarda, he was a natural son of Uko of East Frisia. However, more recent scholarship identifies Rudolf as an illegitimate son of Enno I of East Frisia.

== Biography ==
Rudolph was born around 1490 as the natural son of Enno I of East Frisia.

In 1513, he enrolled at the University of Leipzig under the name Rudolphus Enno de Emeden. He subsequently entered the service of the counts of East Frisia and became one of their senior officials. From 1524 until his death in 1533, he served as Drost of Emden, while also serving as burgomaster of the city between 1526 and 1528. Rudolph also assisted Enno II of East Frisia during the secularisation of the monasteries in East Frisia in 1529.

Although Rudolph occupied prominent offices within the county administration, both he and his descendants continued to be regarded as illegitimate members of the House of Cirksena and were therefore excluded from the line of succession.

== Marriage and issue ==
Rudolph married Gebke Vlaßkooper in Emden. She was the daughter of Hinrick Munthemeister, the mint master of Emden, and Teelke Vlaßkooper. Their known children included:

- Moetke Cirksena, who married Joest von Diepholt. His father, Otto von Diepholt, served as commander under Edzard I of East Frisia during the Saxon feud.
- Enno Cirksena (c. 1522 – 18 July 1545), who died at the age of twenty-three while studying in Paris. A lengthy Latin epitaph erected in the Church of Saint-Severin records details of his life.

== Death ==
Rudolph drowned on 15 March 1533 in an accident at the Knock, west of Emden.

== See also ==
- House of Cirksena
- County of East Frisia
- List of counts of East Frisia
