= Loppersum, Germany =

Loppersum
- Village of Hinte
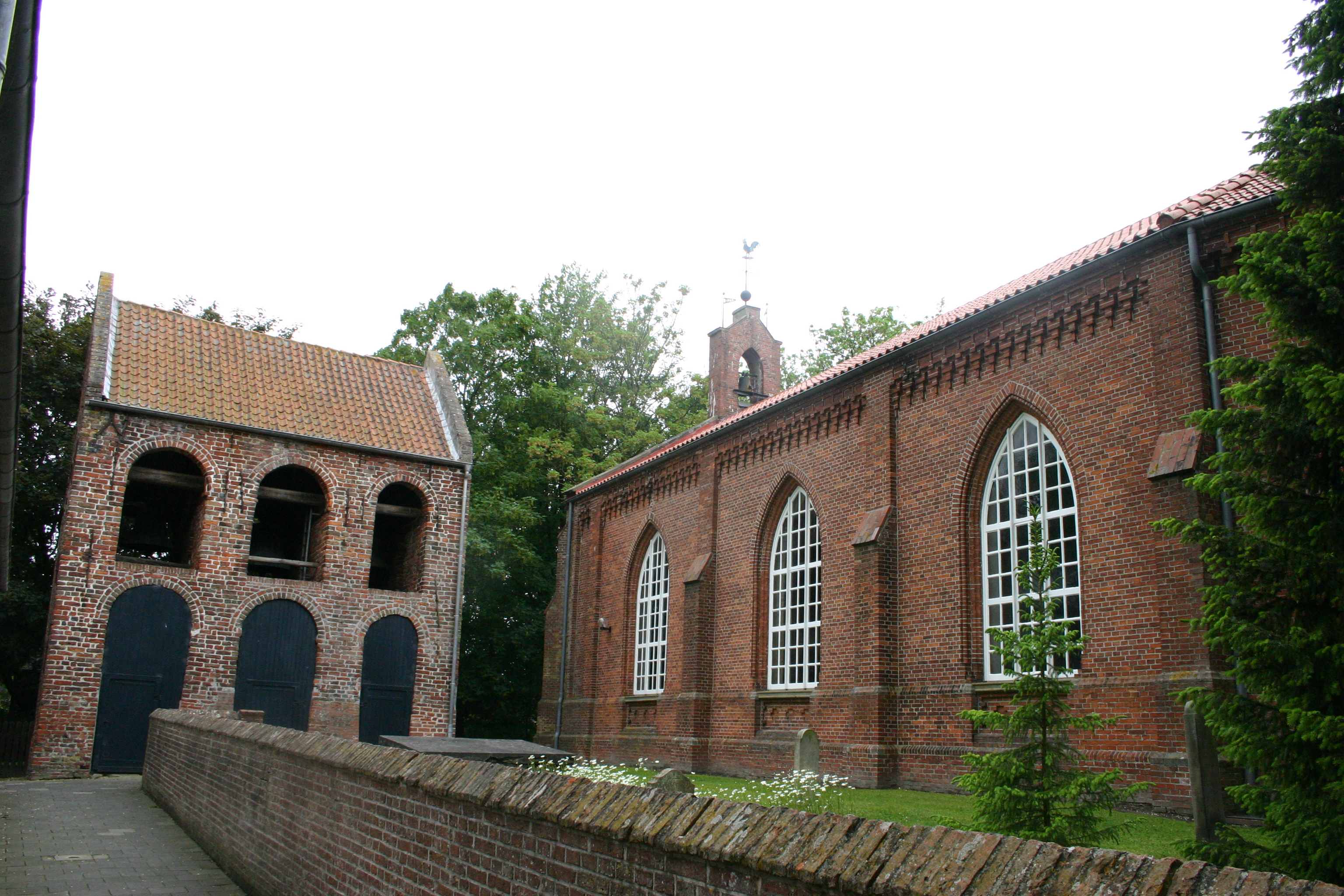
- Church of Loppersum

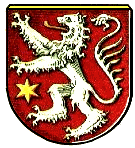
- Coat of arms
- Interactive map of Loppersum
- Location within Germany Location within Lower Saxony
- Country: Germany
- State: Lower Saxony
- District: Aurich
- Municipality: Hinte
- Elevation: 0 m (0 ft)

Population
  - Metro: 1,400
- Time zone: UTC+01:00 (CET)
  - Summer (DST): UTC+02:00 (CEST)
- Postal codes: 26759
- Dialling codes: 04925

Loppersum is a village of almost 1,500 inhabitants in the municipality of Hinte, East Frisia, Germany. Most of the working people have a job in the neighbouring city of Emden.

== Other external links ==
- Loppersum (History of Loppersum, in German, PDF, 826 kB)
