= Dijkhuizen =

Dijkhuizen is a Dutch toponymic surname meaning "houses on the dike". Among variant forms are Dijkhuijsen, Dijkhuis (singular) and Dykhuizen. People with this name include:

- Donald Hugo Dijkhuijsen (1821–1897), Dutch organist and composer (published as D.H. Dijkhuyzen)
- Henk Dijkhuizen (born 1992), Dutch football defender
- Marinus Dijkhuizen (born 1972), Dutch football forward and manager
- Stefanie Dijkhuizen (born 1983), Dutch football midfielder

Dijkhuis / Dykhuis

- Jenske Dijkhuis (born 1980), Dutch designer
- Karl Dykhuis (born 1972), Canadian ice hockey defenceman
- Reinder Dijkhuis (born 1971), Dutch comics artist
