= Friedeburg =

- Municipality
- Flag Coat of arms

- Location of Friedeburg within Wittmund district
- Interactive map of Friedeburg
- Location within Germany Location within Lower Saxony
- Coordinates: 53°27′N 7°50′E
- Country: Germany
- State: Lower Saxony
- District: Wittmund
- Subdivisions: 12 districts

Government
  - Mayor (2021–26): Helfried Goetz (Ind.)

Area
  - Total: 164 km^{2} (63 sq mi)
- Elevation: 3 m (9.8 ft)

Population (2025-12-31)
  - Total: 10,203
  - Density: 62.2/km^{2} (161/sq mi)
- Time zone: UTC+01:00 (CET)
  - Summer (DST): UTC+02:00 (CEST)
- Postal codes: 26446
- Dialling codes: 0 44 65
- Vehicle registration: WTM
- Website: www.friedeburg.de

Friedeburg is a municipality in the district of Wittmund, in Lower Saxony, Germany. It is situated approximately 14 km southeast of Wittmund, and 20 km west of Wilhelmshaven.

About 4 kilometers east of the main village of Friedeburg, near the small village named Etzel, one of Europe's largest salt domes is located. This geological feature is part of the 240 million years old Zechstein Group formations. The salt dome, with a volume of 46 million cubic metres, houses important natural gas storages and crude oil storages. In February, 2022, the government of Lower Saxony decided to subsidize the realization of underground hydrogen storages there as well.
