= Ukena =

Ukena may refer to:

- Focko Ukena (1360 or 1370–1435) East Frisian chieftain
- Paul Ukena (1921–1991), American operatic baritone
- Theda Ukena (1432– 1494), regent of the County of East Frisia.

== Other uses ==
- Ukena District, Iyo, district in Japan
