= Nesse, Dornum =

Nesse
- Village of Dornum
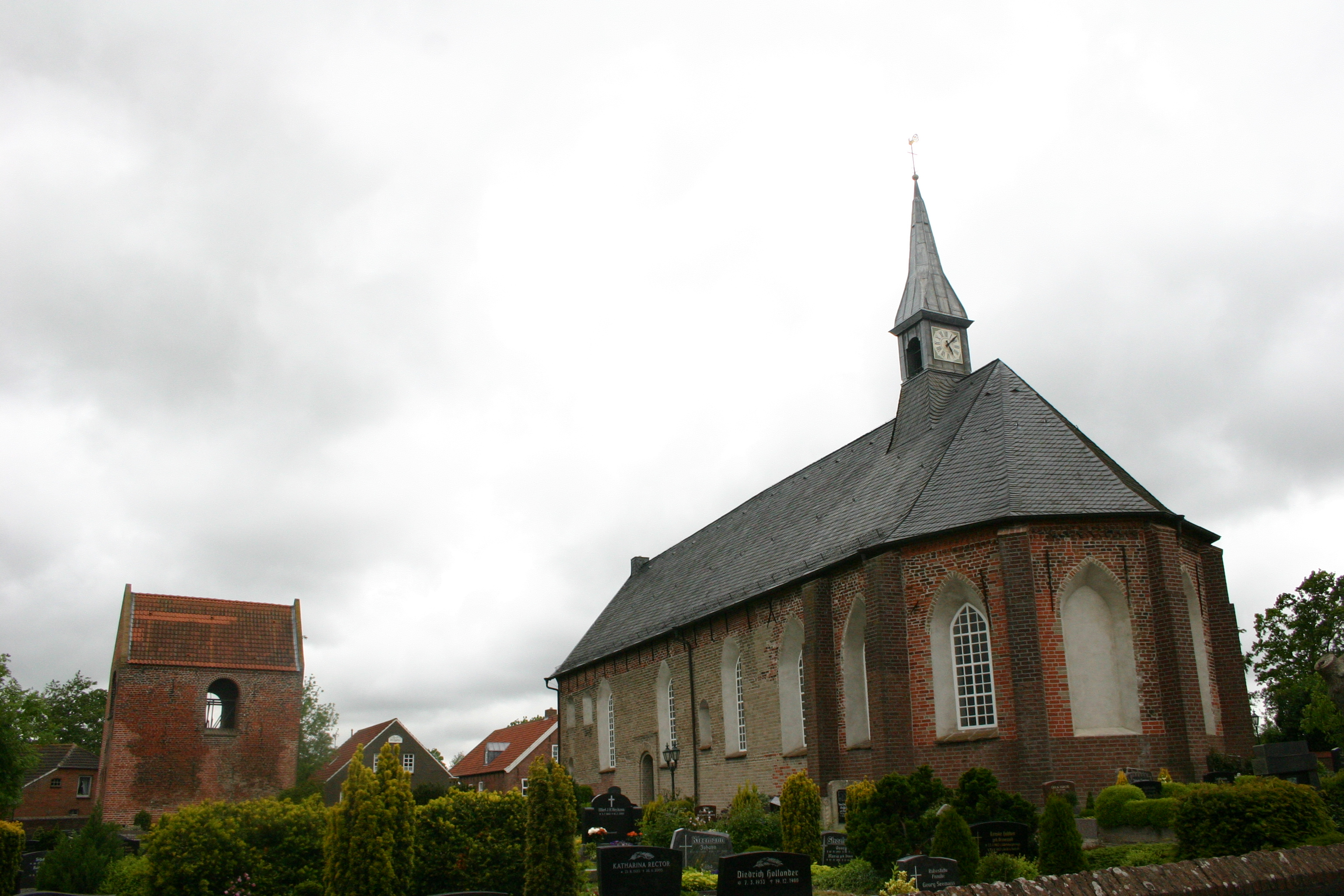
- St. Mary's Church

- Coat of arms
- Interactive map of Nesse
- Location within Germany Location within Lower Saxony
- Coordinates: 53.65366°N 7.37769°E
- Country: Germany
- State: Lower Saxony
- District: Aurich
- Municipality: Dornum
- Elevation: 2 m (6.6 ft)

Population
  - Metro: 677
- Time zone: UTC+01:00 (CET)
  - Summer (DST): UTC+02:00 (CEST)
- Dialling codes: 04933
- Vehicle registration: 26553

Nesse is an East Frisian village in Lower Saxony, Germany. It is an Ortsteil of the municipality of Dornum, in the district of Aurich. It is situated near the Wadden Sea coast, approximately 2.5 km west of the village of Dornum, and 20 km north of the town of Aurich. As of 2021, the village and surrounding farms had a population of 639.

== History ==
Before 2 August 1972, Nesse was the administrative seat of its own eponymously named municipality. From 2 August 1972 to 31 October 2001 it was part of a municipal association (Samtgemeinde), consisting of the municipalities of Dornum, Dornumersiel and Nesse. In 2001, that municipality was renamed Dornum municipality.

== Notable people ==
- Lütet Attena, chieftain (died c. 1410)
