= Hero of Dornum =

- Born: c. 1330
- Died: c. 1410; Dornum
- Noble family: Attena-Westerburg
- Spouse: Etta Ennosna

Hero of Dornum, known as Hero Attena and Hero Eylwerdessen (c. 1330 - c. 1410 in Dornum), was a 14th-century East Frisian chieftain of Dornum and Nesse in the Norderland and Harlingerland.

== Life ==
Hero of Dornum was long regarded in historiography as the progenitor of the Dornum chieftains of the Attena family. According to the historian Almuth Salomon, however, this view is untenable, as the sources of the 14th and 15th centuries contain no evidence that the chieftains of Dornum ever referred to themselves as Attena. Hero owned the Westerburg at Dornum, to which the chief jurisdiction over Dornum was attached. The Norderburg was also in his possession, although it probably had different owners originally. It is unclear whether Hero or one of his ancestors acquired it through marriage. The same applies to the castle at Nesse, which may already have belonged to Hero. It is also possible that it had belonged to the tom Brok family and came into the family's possession through the marriage of Ocka tom Brok and Hero's son Lütet.

In 1358, Hero signed, as the representative of his district in the Harlingerland, a treaty concluded between his regional community and the Hanseatic city of Bremen. He was also among the signatories of a treaty concluded on May 25, 1400, between numerous East Frisian chieftains and the Hanseatic cities. Around 1400, Hero and another Hero (probably his grandson) fought on the side of the tom Brok family in the conflicts among the East Frisian chieftains and in their struggles against the city of Hamburg.

Hero's son Lütet repeatedly complained to Foelke Kampana about the unfaithfulness of his wife, Ocka. Foelke is said to have advised him to kill her. After catching Ocka committing adultery on several occasions, Lütet eventually slew her. This, however, enraged Foelke, who sought to have Lütet arrested. He fled to his father Hero's Norderburg, which Foelke had besieged and eventually captured. On her orders, both Lütet and his father Hero were executed in the castle courtyard.

== Marriage and children ==
The name of Hero's wife is unknown. She may have been Etta Ennosna of the Cirksena family. The couple had at least three sons:

- Enno I (c.1360 - unknown)
- Eger I (c. 1360 - 1467), probably married Idze Idzinga and inherited the Westerburg
- Lütet I (c. 1365 - c. 1410), married Ocka tom Brok and inherited the Norderburg

== See also ==
- Frisians
- House of Attena
- County of East Frisia
- Lordships of Esens, Stedesdorf and Wittmund
- List of counts of East Frisia
