= Enno Edzardisna =

Landeshovetling of East Frisia
- Reign: 1431 - c.1450
- Predecessor: Focko Ukena
- Successor: Ulrich Ennosna (as sole ruler)
- Alongside: Edzard Ennosna (1431–1441); Ulrich Ennosna (1431-c.1450)
- Born: c. 1380
- Died: c. 1450
- Spouse: Unknown; Gela Syardsna of Manslagt
- House: Cirksena
- Father: Edzard II of Appingen-Greetsiel
- Mother: Doda tom Brok

Enno Edzardisna (also known as Enno Cirksena, Enno Attena and rarely Enno Syardsna; c. 1380 – c. 1450) was a chieftain of Norden, Greetsiel, Berum and Pilsum in East Frisia. He was the son of the chieftain Edzard II of Appingen-Greetsiel and his wife Doda tom Brok. Enno was a pioneer of the claim of the house Cirksena to the rule over all of East Frisia, which his son finally Ulrich I formally achieved when he was made an Imperial Count in 1464.

Enno's first wife is not documented. He married his second wife Gela Syardsna of Manslagt (d. 1455), a daughter of the chieftain Affo Beninga of Pilsum. After Gela's only son from her first marriage, the chief Liudward Cirksena ("Syrtza") of Berum, had died without an heir in the middle 1430s, Gela and her niece Frauwa Cirksena ("Sirtzena") were the only heirs of the Cirksena family in Berum. Enno seized the opportunity. His son Edzard from his first marriage, married Frauwa Cirksena and Enno and Edzard adopted the Cirksena family name and coat of arms, to emphasize the succession.

== Children ==
From his first marriage, Enno had the following children:

- Edzard Ennosna (c. 1407 - c. 1441), married Frouwa Sydzena of Berum
- Doda Ennosna (c. 1408 - 1478), married Redward of Westerhusen

From his second marriage, Enno had the following children:

- Ulrich Ennosna (c. 1408 - 27 September 1466), married firstly with Foelke Wibets of Esens and secondly Theda Ukena
- Tiadeke Ennosna (c. 1420 - before 1470), married Haitet Harena of Visquard
- Adda Ennosna (after 1399 - c. 1472), married Lütet II Manninga
- Frouwa Ennosna (c. 1395 - unknown), married firstly Sibold of Dornum and secondly Eppo Gockinga of Zuidbroek
- Ocka Ennosna (c. 1390 - unknown), married firstly Hayo Sinots of Uiterstewehr and secondly Haro Beninga
