= Hinte =

- Municipality
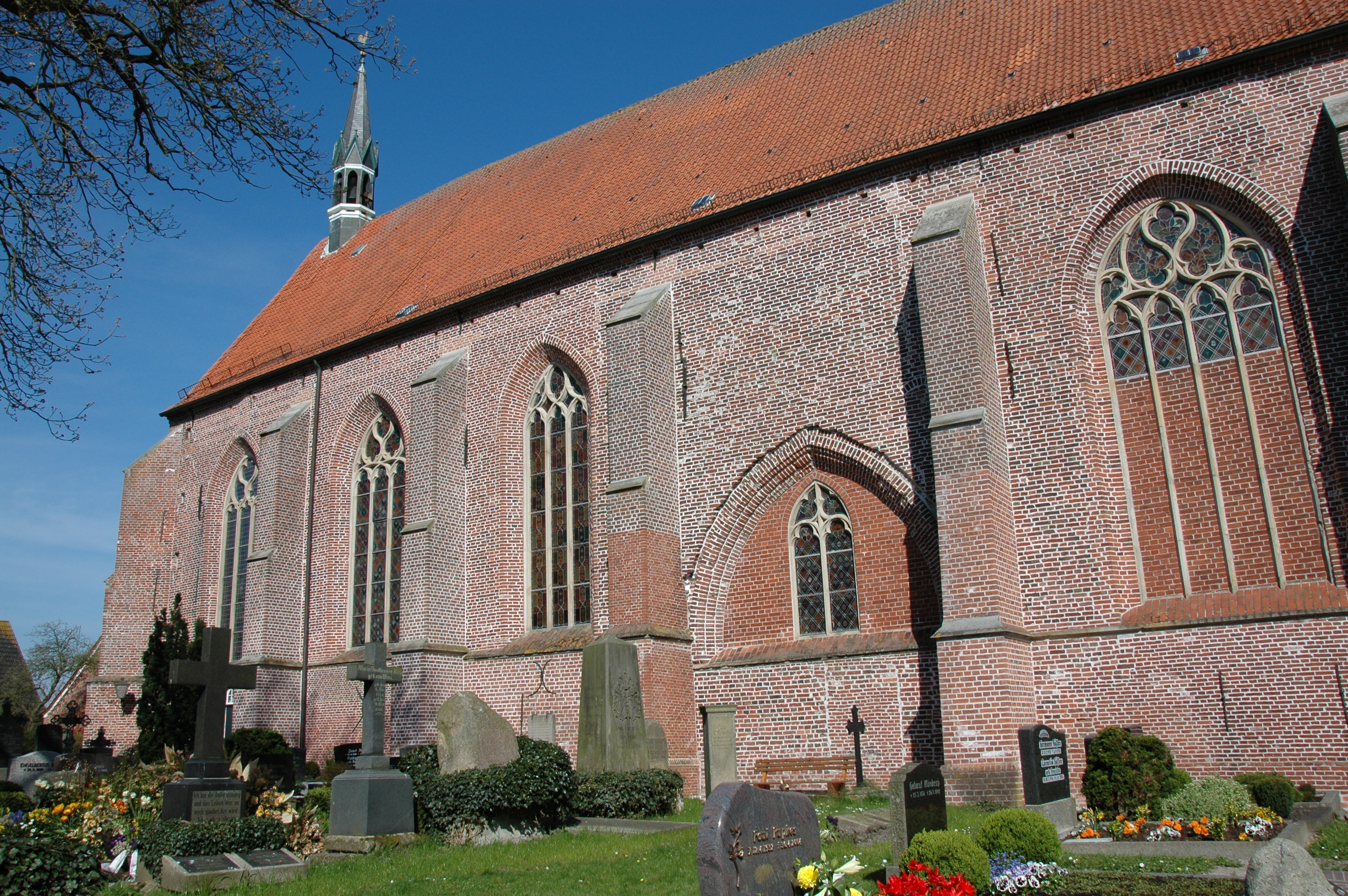
- Protestant church

- Flag Coat of arms

- Location of Hinte within Aurich district
- Interactive map of Hinte
- Location within Germany Location within Lower Saxony
- Coordinates: 53°25′N 7°12′E
- Country: Germany
- State: Lower Saxony
- District: Aurich
- Subdivisions: 8 districts

Government
  - Mayor (2020–25): Uwe Redenius (Ind.)

Area
  - Total: 48.05 km^{2} (18.55 sq mi)
- Elevation: 0 m (0 ft)

Population (2025-12-31)
  - Total: 7,196
  - Density: 149.8/km^{2} (387.9/sq mi)
- Time zone: UTC+01:00 (CET)
  - Summer (DST): UTC+02:00 (CEST)
- Postal codes: 26759
- Dialling codes: 0 49 25
- Vehicle registration: AUR
- Website: www.hinte.de

Hinte (German pronunciation: [ˈhɪntə]) is a village and a municipality in the district of Aurich, in Lower Saxony, Germany. It is situated approximately 20 km south of Norden, and 6 km north of Emden.
