= East Frisian chieftains =

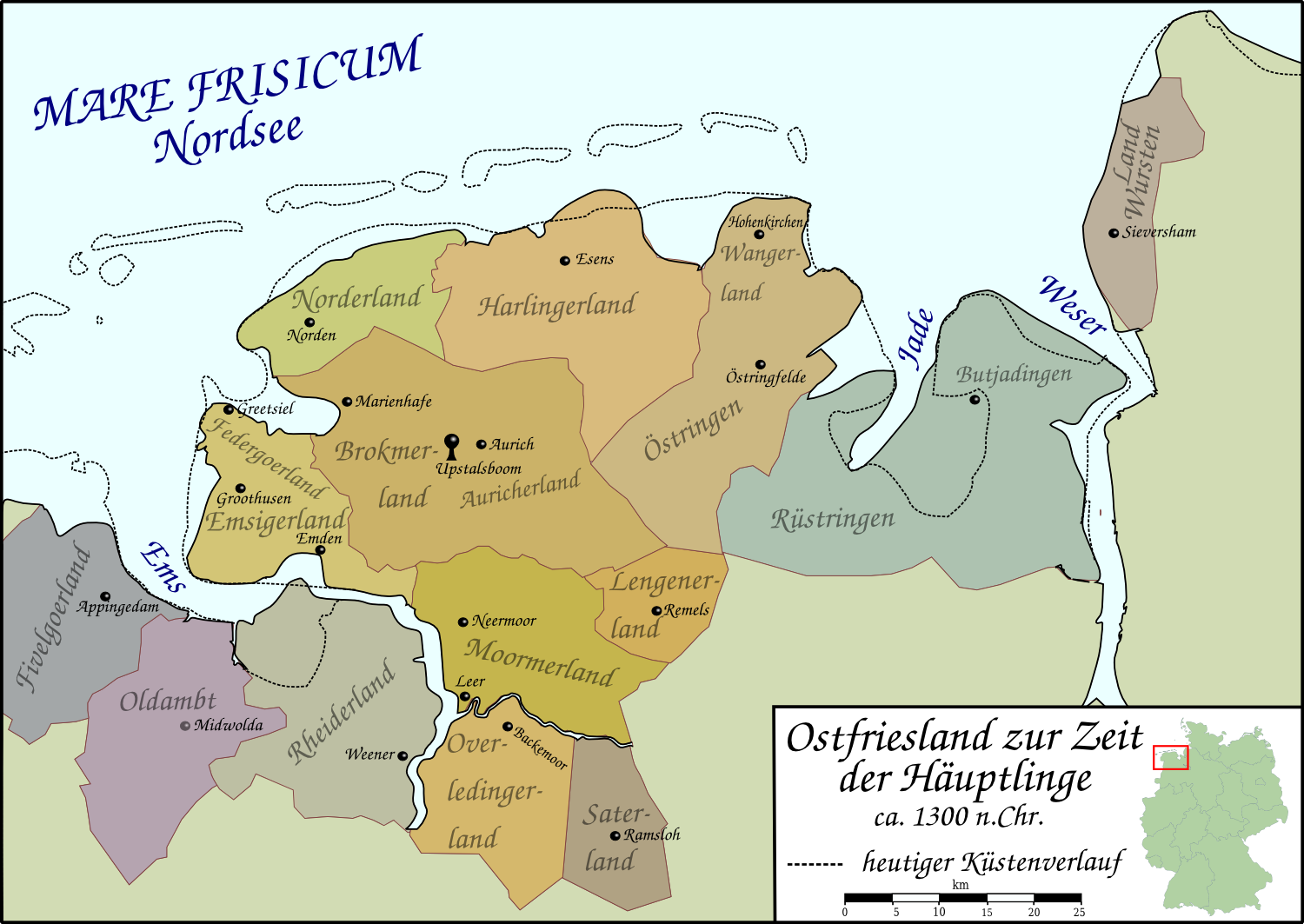
East Frisia at the time of the chieftains.

The East Frisian chieftains (German: Häuptlinge, Low German: hovetlinge / hovedlinge) assumed positions of power in East Frisia during the course of the 14th century, after the force of the old, egalitarian constitution from the time of Frisian Freedom had markedly waned.

== Early history ==
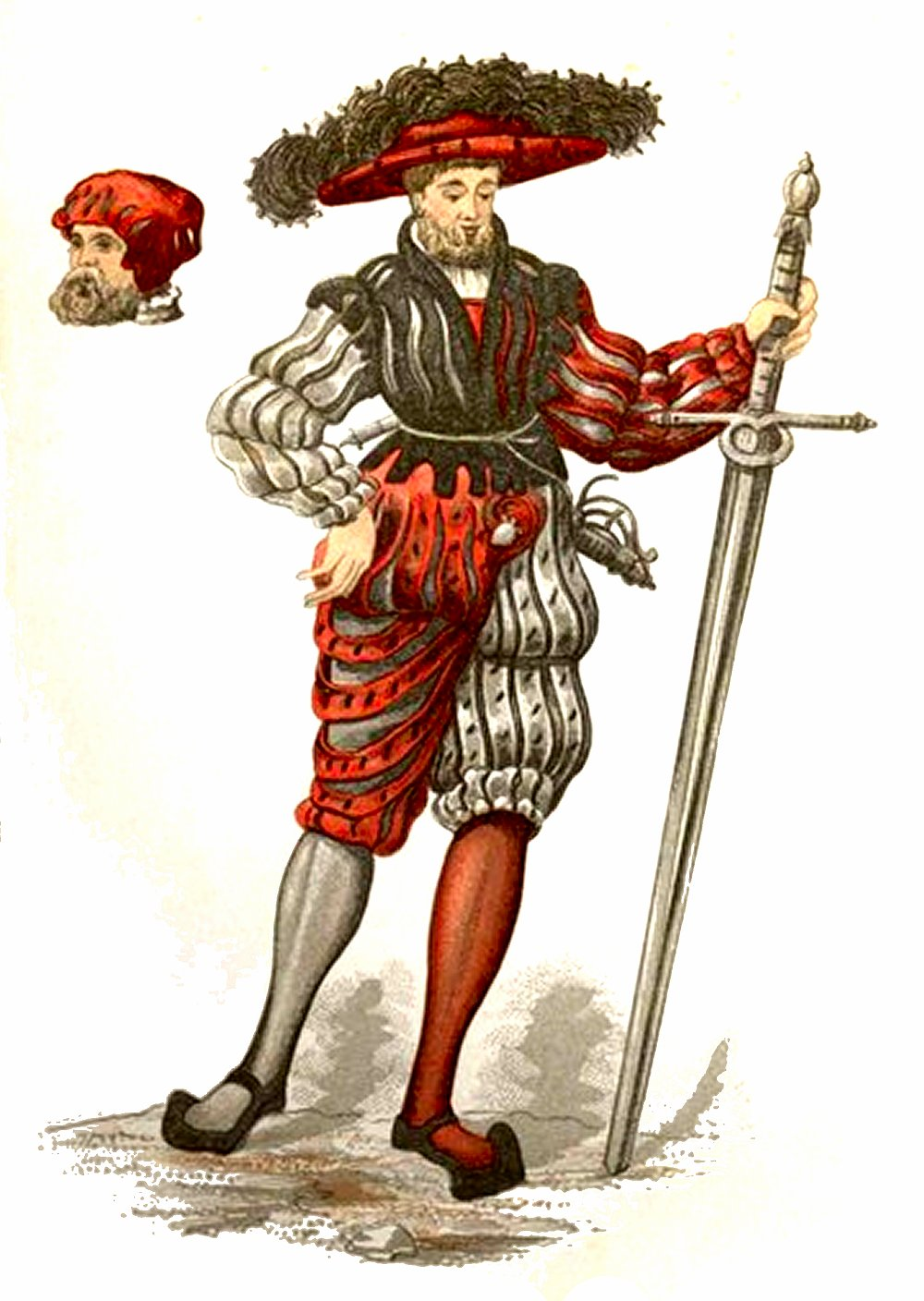
Chieftain in courtly dress, from the house book of Unico Manning, started in 1561.

East Frisia was not under any centralised rule, as was common elsewhere at the time of feudalism during the Middle Ages. By the 12th and 13th centuries the "free Frisians" as they called themselves had organised themselves into quasi-cooperative parishes (Landesgemeinden), in which every member had equal rights, at least in principle. This fundamental equality applied to all owners of farmsteads and their attached estates in their respective villages and church parishes. The public offices of the judges or Redjeven (Latin: consules) were appointed by annual elections. In practice, several nobiles stood out amongst these universitas: the public offices were frequently occupied by members of large and wealthy families. From the 13th century, the status symbols of these nobiles were stone houses (stins, the precursors of the later chieftains' castles) as well as small armies of mercenaries (Söldnerheere).

== Chieftain families ==
The most important East Frisian chieftain families around 1400
Main seat	Family
Broke / Marienhafe	tom Brok
Emden	Abdena
Faldern	Aildesna
Dornum and Nesse	Attena
Greetsiel / Norden	Cirksena
Innhausen / Östringen	Tjarksena / Tiardesna
Langwarden / Innhausen / Knyphausen	Onneken, later named of Innhausen and Knyphausen
Lütetsburg / Pewsum	Manninga
Neermoor / Leer	Ukena
Osterhusen	Allena
Rüstringen / Bant	Wiemken (Papinga)
Wirdum	Beninga

== Literature ==
=== Sources ===
- Hanserecesse. Die Recesse und andere Akten der Hansetage 1256 – 1430, Abt. I, Bd. 4, hrsg. v. Hansischer Geschichtsverein, Leipzig 1872–77.
- Urkundenbuch der Stadt Lübeck, Abt. I, Bd. 4, hrsg. v. Verein für Lübeckische Geschichte und Altertumskunde, Lübeck 1873.
- Ostfriesisches Urkundenbuch, hrsg. von Ernst Friedländer, Bd. 1 und 2, Emden 1878 und 1881.

=== Secondary sources ===
- Dieter Zimmerling: Störtebeker & Co. : die Blütezeit der Seeräuber in Nord- und Ostsee. Verlag Die Hanse, Hamburg, 2000, ISBN 3-434-52573-4
- Hartmut Roder: Klaus Störtebeker – Häuptling der Vitalienbrüder, in: his (ed.): Piraten – Herren der Sieben Meere, Bremen, 2000.
- Heinrich Schmidt: Das östliche Friesland um 1400. Territorialpolitische Strukturen und Bewegungen, in: Wilfried Ehbrecht: Störtebeker: 600 Jahre nach seinem Tod. Porta-Alba-Verlag, Trier, 2005, ISBN 3-933701-14-7, pp. 85–110.
- Heinrich Schmidt: Mittelalterliche Kirchengeschichte, in: Rolf Schäfer (ed.): Oldenburgische Kirchengeschichte. Isensee, Oldenburg, 1999, ISBN 3-89598-624-0
- Heinrich Schmidt: Piraten gern gesehen, in: DAMALS, Das Magazin für Geschichte und Kultur, 38th year, April (4) 2006, pp. 30–36.
- Heinrich Schmidt: Politische Geschichte Ostfrieslands, Leer, 1975.
- Matthias Puhle: Die Vitalienbruder: Klaus Störtebeker und die Seeräuber der Hansezeit, 2nd edn., Campus Verlag, Frankfurt, 1994, ISBN 3-593-34525-0.
