= Focko Ukena =

East Frisian chieftain (died 1435)

- Landeshovetling of East Frisia
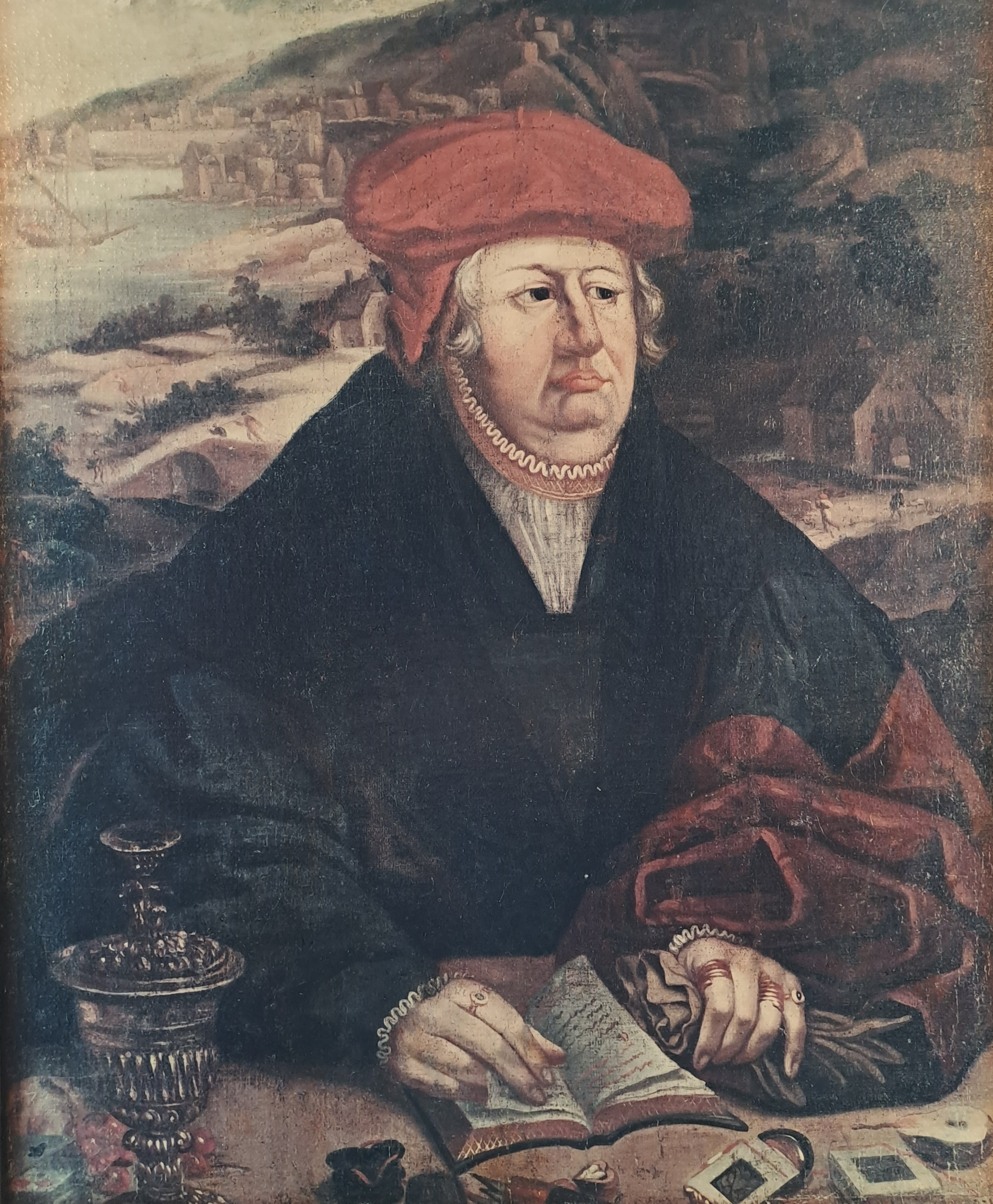
- Focko Ukena, Landeshovetling of East Frisia

Landeshovetling of East Frisia
- Reign: 28 October 1427 – 1431
- Predecessor: Ocko II tom Brok
- Successor: Enno Edzardisna; Edzard Ennosna; Ulrich Ennosna
- Born: c. 1370; Neermoor
- Died: 6 October 1436; Appingedam
- Spouse: Theda of Reide; Hiddeke Ripperda; Hebe tom Brok; Eneke
- Issue: Uko Fockena; Udo Fokkena; Amke Fokkena; Bawe Fokkena; Ulske Fokkena
- House: Ukena
- Father: Uko of Neermoor
- Mother: Amke of Lengen

Focko Ukena (c. 1370 in Neermoor – 6 October 1436 in Appingedam) was an East Frisian chieftain (hovetling) who played an important part in the struggle between the Vetkopers and Schieringers in the provinces of Groningen and Friesland. Aside from this he was one of the leading figures in the resistance against the forts of stately authority in East-Frisia of the tom Brok family.

== Frisian freedom ==
Medieval and early modern Frisia (roughly the modern Dutch provinces of Groningen and Friesland, and the German coastal region of East Frisia) enjoyed what was known as the Frisian freedom, where virtually no state authority was exerted on the populace. This freedom was threatened from several sides.

In what is now East Frisia, the family of tom Brok was attempting to establish a dynasty. In what is now the province of Friesland, the counts of Holland were expanding their influence. The city of Groningen was also trying to expand its power. Through all of this the rivalry of the Vetkopers and Schieringers played out.

== Role of Ukena ==
Ukena was originally a military commander under Keno II tom Brok. As such he defeated Sicko Sjaerda at Noordhorn in 1417, and conquered Dokkum in 1418. After the reconquest of Dokkum by the Schieringers, he disembarked at Hindeloopen and defeated the Schieringers at the Palesloot.

Ukena took Stavoren and besieged Sloten, but was forced to withdraw by the troops of John III, Duke of Bavaria, Count of Holland. Ukena was the first to sign the Peace of Groningen on 1 February 1422, which was aimed against all foreign lords. Next he battled with the Hansa against the Likedelers, and expelled them from Ezumazijl and Dokkum. Afterwards he turned against tom Brok and was primarily active in East Frisia.

Ukena was unable to sustain his resistance to tom Brok, and eventually retreated to the castle of Dijkhuizen at Appingedam, which was the property of his second wife, Hiddeke Ripperda. He died there in 1435. His resistance eventually prevented tom Brok from taking the much-wanted County of East Frisia.
