= Lütet Attena =

- Died: c. 1410; Dornum
- Noble family: Attena-Westerburg
- Spouse: Ocka tom Brok
- Father: Hero Attena
- Mother: Etta Ennosna

Lütet Attena (died: c. 1410, in Dornum) was a 14th-century East Frisian chieftain of Dornum and Nesse in the Norderland area.

== Life ==
Lütet Attena was a son of Hero Attena. His brothers were Eger and Enno Attena. In 1395 Lütet married Ocka tom Brok, the daughter of the chieftain Ocko I tom Brok and Foelke Kampana from the adjacent Brokmerland. They had two daughters named Etta and Hebe.

== Legend ==
Legend has it that when Lütet complained to Foelke, his mother-in-law about the infidelity of his wife Ocka, Foelke advised him to kill Ocka. When Lütet again caught Ocka in an act of adultery, he did just that. Foelke then sought revenge and tried to utilize the situation to expand the influence of her family on the Attena's territory. Lütet fled to his father's castle in Dornum, Norderburg Castle. Foelke besieged the castle and conquered it. In 1397, Hero was executed in the courtyard of Norderburg Castle on her orders. This earned her the nickname Quade Foelke ("evil Foelke").

Modern research suggests that, although there may be a grain of truth in some parts of the legend, the story about the execution is definitely incorrect: Hero and Lüten were executed much later, in 1410 or 1411, on the orders of Foelke's son Keno II. For that matter, there is no historic evidence that she deserved her nickname as "evil Foelke".

== See also ==
- East Frisian chieftains
- tom Brok

== Footnotes ==
Lütet Attena Dornum Died: circa 1410
| Preceded by Hero Attena | Chieftain of Norderland ?-1396 | Succeeded by Maurice Kankena |
