= List of Brick Romanesque buildings =

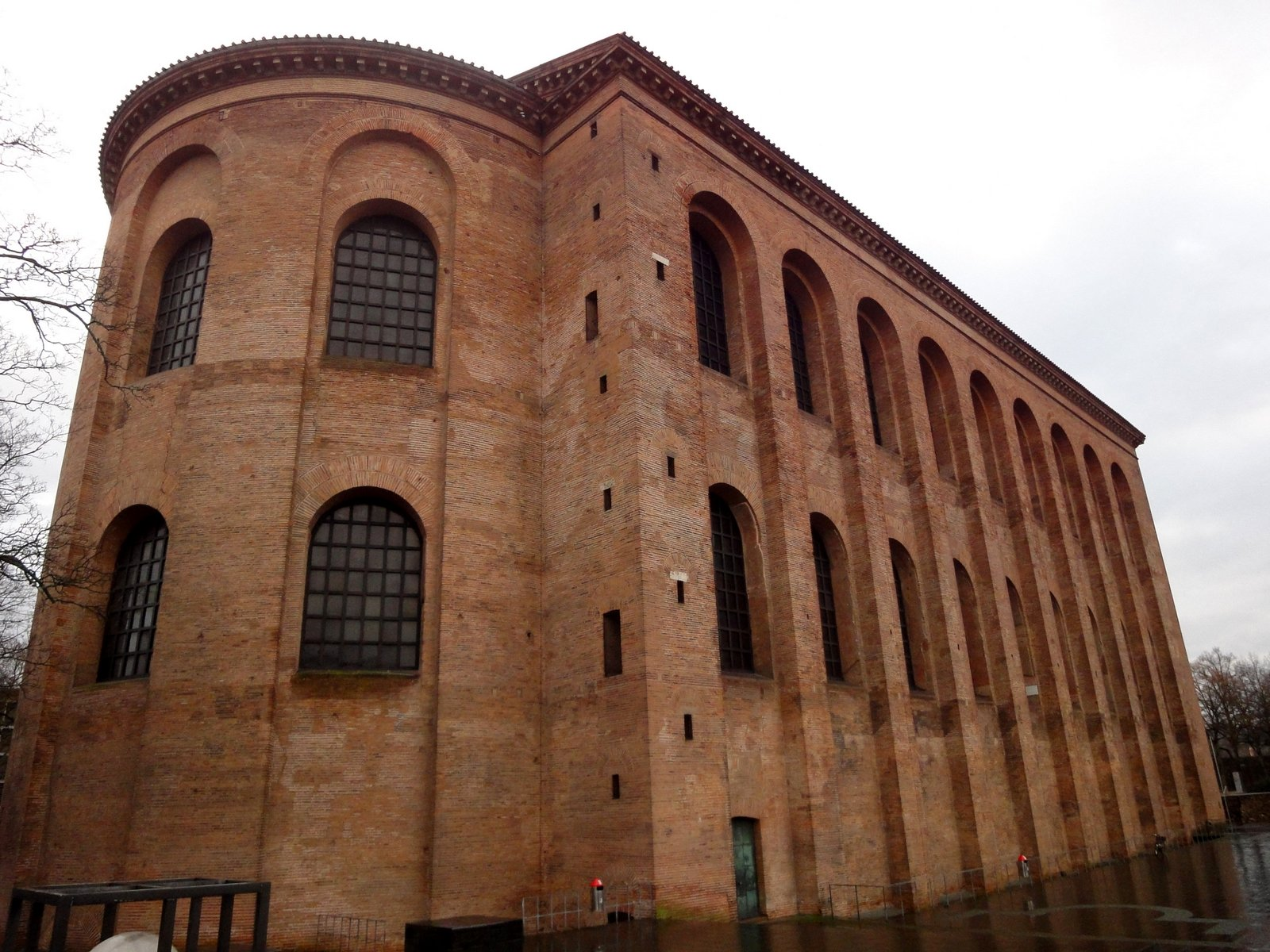
Aula Palatina in Trier, built about 310

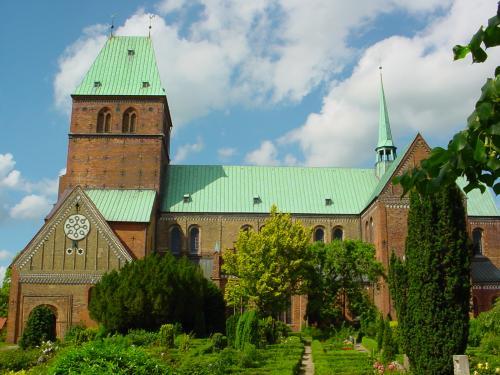
Ratzeburg Cathedral, since 1154–1160

Brick Romanesque is an architectural style and chronological phase of architectural history. The term described Romanesque buildings built of brick; like the subsequent Brick Gothic, it is geographically limited to Central Europe. Structures in other regions are not described as Brick Romanesque but as "Romanesque brick-built church" or similar terms.

In comparison to Brick Gothic, Brick Romanesque is a less established and less frequently used term. On the one hand, this is caused by the fact that the Baltic region was only beginning to develop its own stylistic identity during the Romanesque period, on the other by the relatively low number of surviving buildings. Many of the major Brick Gothic edifices had Brick Romanesque predecessors, remains of which are often still visible. Nearly all preserved buildings are churches. The buildings contrast with earlier stone-built churches (fieldstone churches), which were constructed of glacial erratics and rubble. Such rounded stones limit the potential size of a building; the material and technique do not permit the construction of structures larger than a village church for static reasons. Monumental constructions only became possible through the growing use and perfection of brick building.

== Import of technique and style ==
Already in the antique Roman Empire huge brick buildings had been erected north of the Alps, but present-day Denmark and present-day northern Germany east of Elbe River never had been part of that empire, and west of the Elbe its rule had been too short to build more than some military camps. Even in the northern Roman provinces, the techniques of building in brick were forgotten with the decay of the empire.

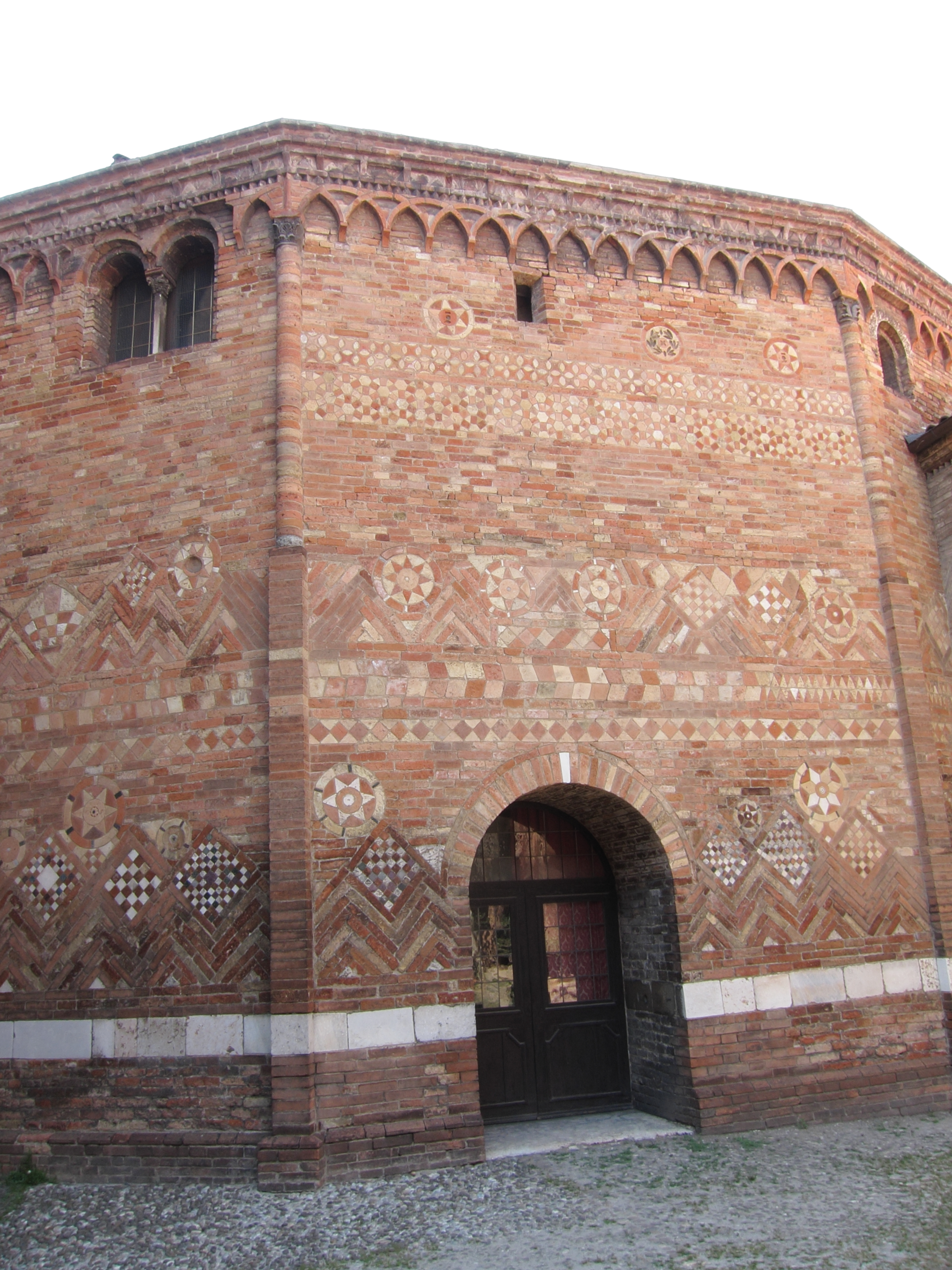
Elaborated technique in the 10th c. – Church of the Holy Sepulchre of Santo Stefano compound in Bologna

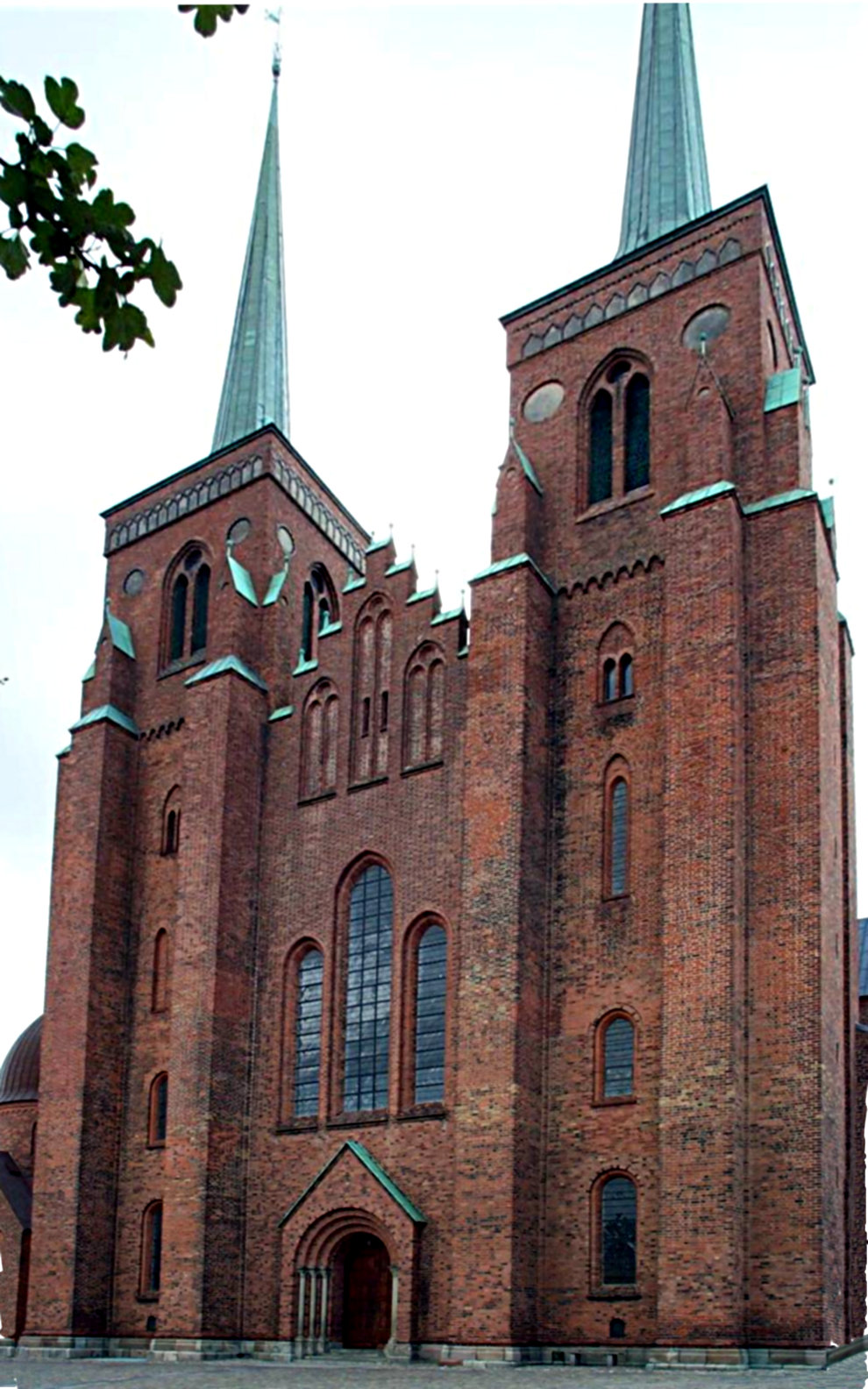
Roskilde Cathedral,
since 1170

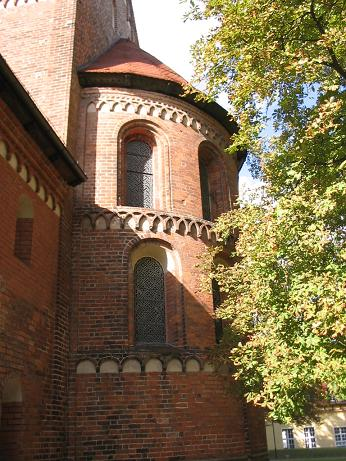
Apse of Lehnin Abbey,
since 1180

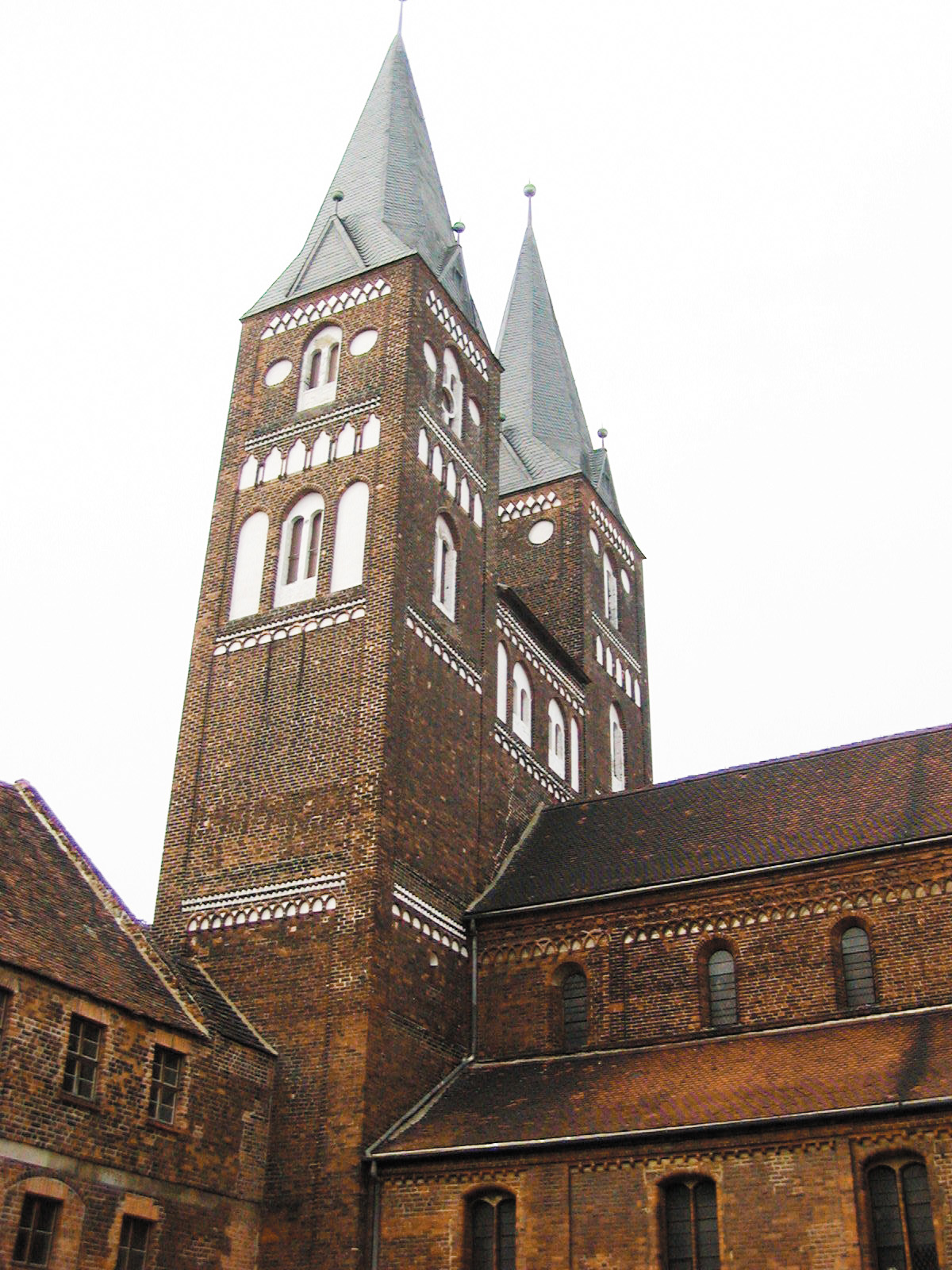
Jerichow Monastery,
since 1149

But in Langobardia Major, northern Italy, there was a continuity of building in bricks from late Antiquity to early Middle Ages. In Early Lombard Romanesque style, technique and shapes, later on, typical for the Baltic Sea were already completely developed. During the 12th century, Northern Germany and Denmark, at that time the major power of North Sea and Baltic Sea, imported the techniques and many elements of style from the Padan Region.

St. John's Church (Sankt-Johannis-Kirche) in Oldenburg (Holstein) is considered to be the oldest brick church in Northern Europe. The first monumental churches were Ratzeburg Cathedral and Lübeck Cathedral, both begun shortly after 1160 under Henry the Lion. Lübeck Cathedral was later converted into a Gothic hall church (1266 to 1335). Jerichow Monastery with its convent church of which construction started in 1148 played an influential role for the brick architecture in the Margraviate of Brandenburg. For Scandinavia, the stylistically independent Roskilde Cathedral, started in the 1170s and used as the burial church for Danish monarchs, is of special importance. The last flourish and the transition to the Gothic style is marked by the Cistercian Lehnin Abbey in the Margraviate of Brandenburg.

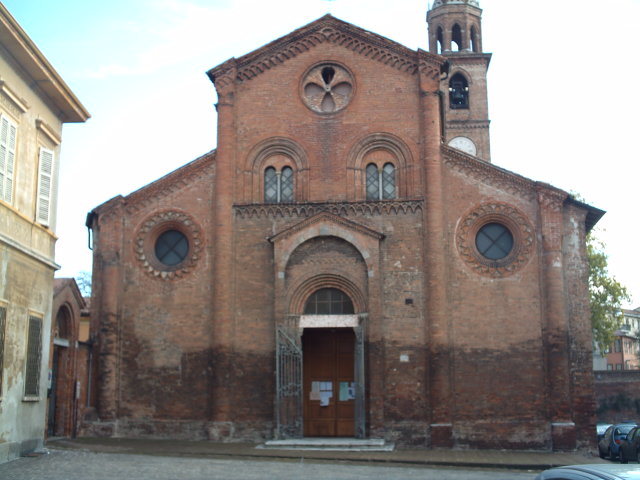
San Michele in Cremona, Lombardy

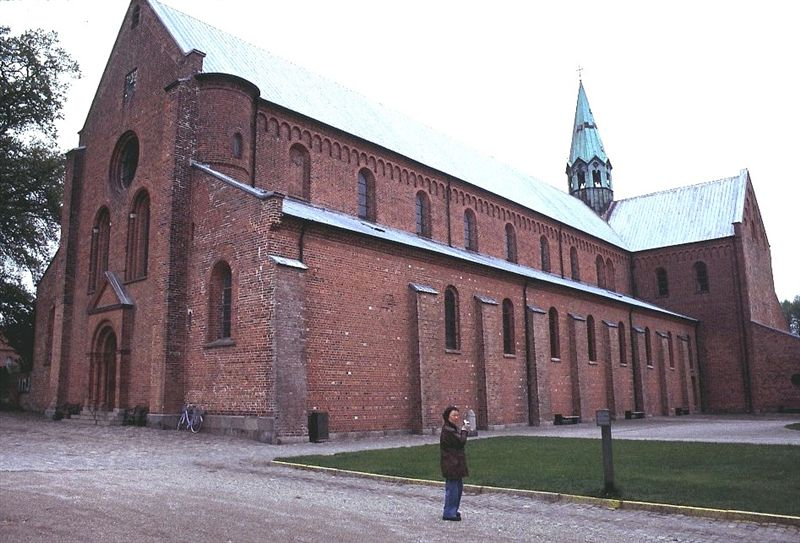
Sorø Abbey on Zealand, since 1161

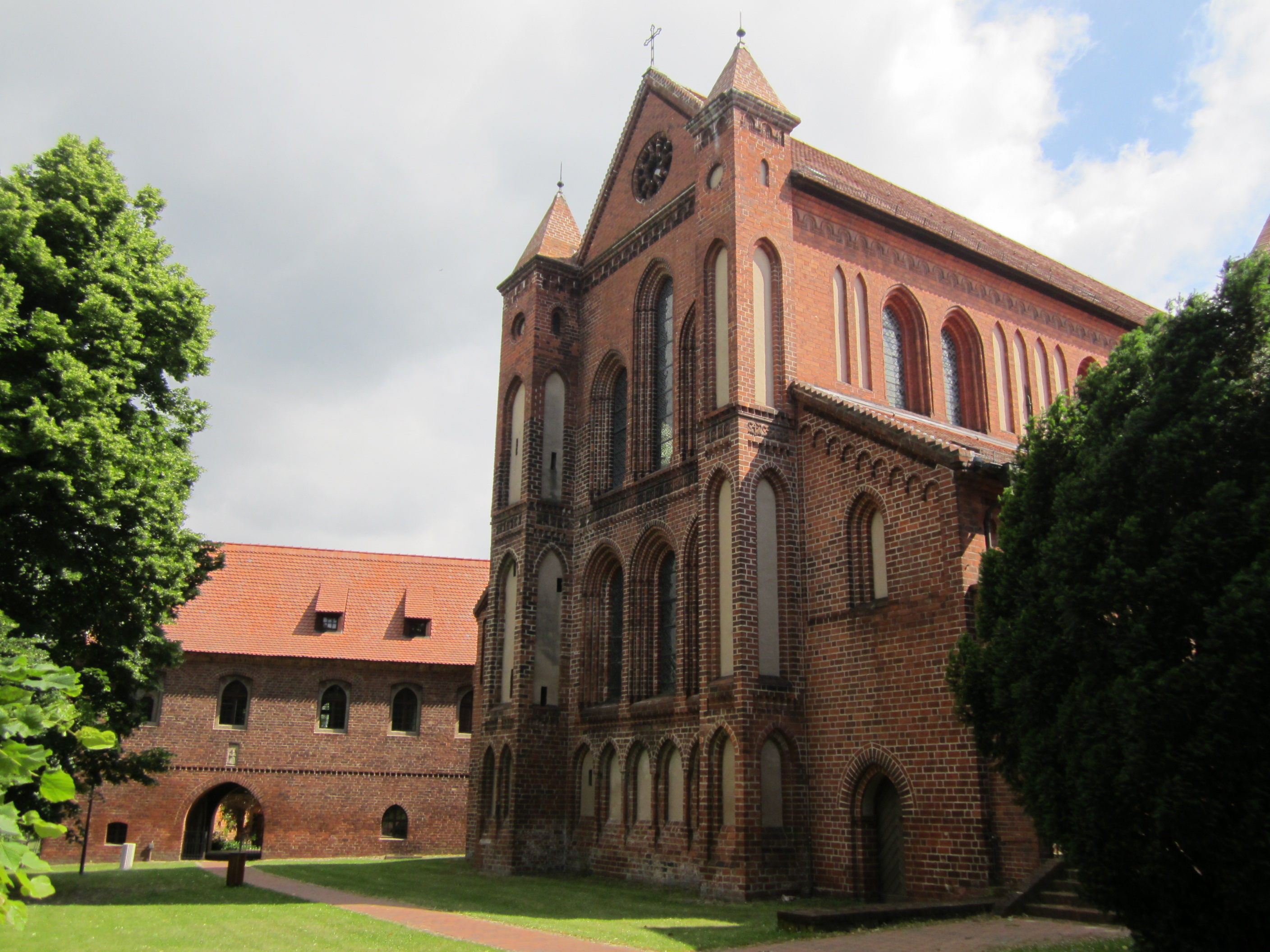
Lehnin Abbey in Brandenburg

== Denmark ==
Place	Building	Main period of construction	Special features	Image
Kalundborg	Church of Our Lady	circa 1170–1200	central structure on Greek cross plan; central tower and 4 side towers of nearly the same height	
Ledøje	Residential Church	circa 1225		
Nyborg	Nyborg Castle	about 1170	mid 13th century to 1416 main residence of the Kings of Denmark	
Ringsted	St. Benedict	built 1163–1170	one of the earliest brick churches in Northern Europe, basilica	
Roskilde	Cathedral	mainly 1170–1280	UNESCO World Heritage Site, burial church of Danish monarchs	
Sorø	Abbey	after 1161	former Cistercian basilica	

== Germany ==
=== West of Weser River ===
Place	Building	Main period of construction	Special features	Image
Bagband (Großefehn, East Frisia)	Village Church			
Bassum	Collegiate Church		begun in Romanesque, completed in Gothic style, hall church	
Bingum (incorporated to Leer, East Frisia)	St. Matthew's	1st quarter of 13th century		
Blexen (Weser estuary)	St. Hippolyte	choir in the 11./12th century begun in cubes of granite and completed in brick, nave and tower (13th century) completely of brick		
Bücken (Weser)	Collegiate Church	stone building of the 11th century enlarged in brick in the 13th century		
Bunde (East Frisia)	Reformed Church	about 1200	begun in Romanesque style	
Canum (Krummhörn)	Village Church	2nd half of the 13th century		
Ditzum (Rheiderland)	Village Church	early or mid 13th century		
Dunum (Esens, East Frisia)	Village Church	1200–1220		
Emden	Große Kirche (Large Church)	about 1200	Romanesque, later enlarged in Gothic style, 1943 completely destroyed by bombs, new building in 1948/49	
Fedderwarden (Wilhelmshaven)	St.-Stephanus-Kirche	about 1250	Romano-Gothic, tower added in 1875	
Freepsum (Krummhörn)	Village Church	about 1260		
Golzwarden (Stadland)	St.-Bartholomäus-Kirche	1263	Northern wall mixed with fieldstone, choir newer	
Hage (East Frisia)	St.-Ansgari-Kirche	1220		
Heiligenfelde (Syke)	Michaeliskirche	early 13th century		
Hinte (East Frisia)	Bell house of the Village Church	13th century	Romanesque bell house, late Gothic nave	
Holtgaste (Rheiderland)	Liudgeri-Kirche	1st half of 13th century		
Holtrop (Großefehn, East Frisia)	Village Church			
Kirchweyhe (a parish of Weyhe)	Felicianuskirche	tower about 1250	nave in 1906 replaced by a Gothic Revival one	
Midlum (Rheiderland)	Village Church	early or middle 13th century	nave about 1840 very much altered	
Norden (East Frisia)	Ludgeri-Kirche	1200–1220 or 1230–1250	Western part of the nave Romanesque, Gothic enlargement (transept and choir)	
Pilsum (Krummhörn)	Village Church	13th century		
Sengwarden (Wilhelmshaven)	St.-Georgs-Kirche	about 1250	gothified in the 15th century	
Strackholt (Großefehn, East Frisia)	Village Church			
Suurhusen (Hinte, East Frisia)	Village Church	nave mid 13th century, later a bit altered, (leaning) tower built about 1450, but in Romanesque style		
Victorbur (Südbrookmerland, East Frisia)	Village Church	1st half of 13th century	aisleless church	
Wiegboldsbur (Südbrookmerland, East Frisia)	Village Church	about 1250		
Bad Zwischenahn	St.-John's-Church	in the 12th century begun in fieldstone, afterwards cubes of granite, then Romanesqueer brick building, then Brick Gothic; has an adjacent western tower and an isolated belfry		

=== Between Weser and Elbe ===
Place	Building	Main period of construction	Special features	Image
Anhalt Castle (near Harzgerode)		1123 and 1147	Ascan hill castle, only little relics	
Arendsee	Arendsee Monastery	1184–1240, consecrated already in 1208		
Beuster	Collegiate church (Stiftskirche) St. Nikolaus	12th c. (choir completed in 1172)		
Blockland, Bremen	Wasserhorst Parish Church	tower 13th century	Romano-Gothic, nave remodeled in 1743 to very moderate Baroque	
Diesdorf	Diesdorf Monastery	1161–1220	late Romanesque	
Giesenslage near Behrendorf	Village Church	probably late 12th century		
Königsmark	Village Church	probably 12th century	originally a basilica	
Königsmark	Wolterslage Village Church		tower Romanesque, nave altered to Gothic	
Mandelsloh (incorporated to Neustadt am Rübenberge)	St. Osdag Church	1180	basilica of brick with a tower of boulers	
Mildensee (incorporated to Dessau-Roßlau)	Pötnitz Church	consecrated 1198	originally triple-aisled basilica. Side aisles demolished in the 17th century. Southernmost Brick Romanesque in Central Germany.	
Osterholz-Scharmbeck	Monastic Church of St Mary	1185–1197	later converted to a Gothic hall church, large alterations in 18th c.	
Salzwedel	St Laurence Church	13th c.	basilica	
Verden	tower of Verden Cathedral	since c. 1160	Gothic nave of sandstone, else Brick Gothic	
Verden	St. John's	onset in the mid 12th century	tower and chancel Romanesque, nave Gothic	
Wittingen	St. Steven's Church	about 1250	nave romanesque, tower & choir Gothic	

=== East of Elbe River ===
Place	Building	Main period of construction	Special features	Image
Altenkirchen	Parish Church	begun probably about 1185	near previous Slavic cult place of the god Svantevit on Cape Arkona	
Altenkrempe	Basilica	1190 to 1240		
Bad Segeberg	St. Mary's			
Bergen auf Rügen	St. Mary's			
Eutin	St. Michael's	1180s to early 13th century		
Gadebusch	Town Church St. Jacob and St. Dionysius	Late Romanesque, begun about 1220		
Jerichow	Jerichow Monastery	1148–1172	former Premonstratensian collegiate church, oldest brick structure East of the Elbe River	
Lehnin	Lehnin Abbey	circa 1185–1235, altered up to 1260		
Lübeck	Cathedral	1163–1230	Romanesque nave, Gothic choir	
Lübow	Village Church	1st half 13th century	possibly residential church of nearby Mecklenburg Castle	
Melkow (Wust-Fischbeck)	Village Church	circa 1200		
Mölln	St. Nicholas	early 13th century	basilica	
Neubukow	Parish Church		double-naved hall church	
Neukloster	St. Mary's, church of Monastery Sonnenkamp	before 1227		
Oldenburg (Holstein)	St. John's	mainly built 1156–1160	oldest brick church in Northern Europe	
Ratzeburg	Cathedral	mainly 1160–1220	oldest fully preserved brick church east of Elbe	
Rehna	Rehna Monastery	Late Romanesque	single-naved monastery church	
Rieseby	Village Church	circa 1220/1230		
Sagard	St. Michael's Church	1210	choir replaced at about 1400 and tower added at about 1500 in Gothic style	
Schaprode	Village Church	1st half 13th century		
Schlagsdorf	Village Church	1st half 13th century		
Schleswig	Schleswig Cathedral	1134 – c. 1200	built of granite, tufa and brick; Gothic additions 1275-1300; tower 20th century	
Schönhausen	Village Church	consecrated 1212		
Bad Segeberg	St. Mary's Church			
Vietlübbe (near Dragun)	Village Church	early 13th century	Latin cross plan	
Wust	Village Church	circa 1200	tower added in the 18th century	

== Poland ==
Place	Building	Main period of construction	Special features	Image
Inowrocław	St. Mary's Church	12th and 13th century	brick towers	
Kamień Pomorski	Cathedral St. John	after 1175 to 1250		
Kołbacz	Abbey	begun shortly after 1200	former Cistercian basilica	
Lublin	Lublin Castle Donjon	12th century	upper parts in brick, lower in limestone	
Oliwa	Abbey	after 1178	former Cistercian Monastery	
Płock	Płock Cathedral	1130–1144	rebuilt several times	
Poznań	Church of Saint John of Jerusalem outside the walls	c. 1187	one of the first brick-built churches in Poland	
Sandomierz	Church of St. Jacob	13th century		
Strzelno	Holy Trinity Church	12th century – 1216		
Strzelno	Rotunda of St. Prokop	brick parts 15th or 16th century	Romanesque and brick, but no Romanesque brick: the Romanesque original parts, erected since before 1133, are of red granite	
Święta Katarzyna	St. Catherine's Church			
Wąchock	Wąchock Abbey	after 1179	brick and sandstone	
Wrocław	St. Giles's (św. Idziego) Church	about 1220–1230	probably before the Battle of Legnica	

== Sweden ==
Place	Building	Main period of construction	Special features	Image
Vinslöv	Gumlösa Parish Church	consecrated 1192	oldest brick building in present-day South Sweden (then Danish)	
Linköping	Cathedral	1230 onwards	took 250 years to build, so most visible parts Gothic	

== Bibliography ==
- Wolf Karge: Romanische Kirchen im Ostseeraum. Rostock, Hinstorff 1996 (in German). ISBN 3-356-00689-4
