= Moordorf =

Moordorf is the name of two places in Germany:

- Moordorf (Westermoor), a former municipality in Schleswig-Holstein
- Moordorf, Lower Saxony, a village in Lower Saxony
