= Theene =

- Village of Südbrookmerland
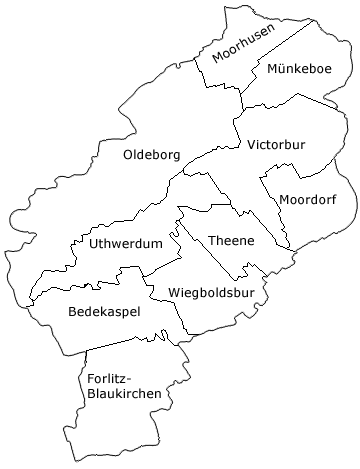
- Ortsteile of Südbrookmerland
- Interactive map of Theene
- Location within Germany Location within Lower Saxony
- Coordinates: 53.46140°N 7.34833°E
- Country: Germany
- State: Lower Saxony
- District: Aurich
- Municipality: Südbrookmerland

Population
  - Metro: 1,301
- Time zone: UTC+01:00 (CET)
  - Summer (DST): UTC+02:00 (CEST)
- Dialling codes: 04942
- Vehicle registration: 26624

Theene is an East Frisian village in Lower Saxony, Germany. A linear settlement, it is an Ortsteil of the municipality of Südbrookmerland, located directly to the north of Wiegboldsbur.

Theene was an independent municipality until it was incorporated into the municipality of Südbrookmerland on 1 July 1972.
