= Uthwerdum =

- Village of Südbrookmerland
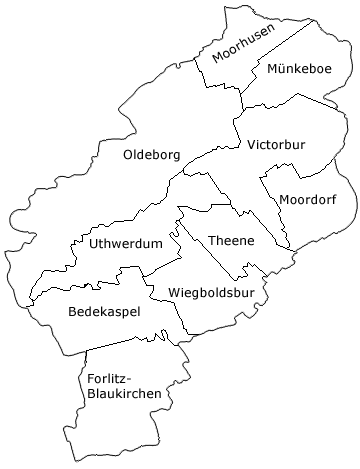
- Ortsteile of Südbrookmerland
- Interactive map of Uthwerdum
- Location within Germany Location within Lower Saxony
- Coordinates: 53.48138°N 7.33708°E
- Country: Germany
- State: Lower Saxony
- District: Aurich
- Municipality: Südbrookmerland

Area
  - Metro: 9.89 km^{2} (3.82 sq mi)
- Elevation: 3 m (9.8 ft)

Population
  - Metro: 1,255
- Time zone: UTC+01:00 (CET)
  - Summer (DST): UTC+02:00 (CEST)
- Dialling codes: 04942
- Vehicle registration: 26624

Uthwerdum is an East Frisian village in Lower Saxony, Germany. It is an Ortsteil of the municipality of Südbrookmerland, located east of Moordorf. Administratively, the Ortsteil of Uthwerdum includes the settlements of Abelitz, Georgsheil, Uthwerdum, and Victorburer Marsch.

Uthwerdum was an independent municipality until it was incorporated into the municipality of Südbrookmerland on 1 July 1972.

== Etymology ==
Uthwerdum was first mentioned in 1476 as to Uthwerdum. Later, it was recorded as Uthwehrum (end of the 17th century) and Uthwerdum (1871). The name is to be interpreted as the Old Frisian dative plural form ut-werum, i.e. "(at the) outermost (distant) weirs". Other sources believe that the name is to be interpreted as the Old Frisian dative plural form of werf, "elevation" or "dwelling", with the loss of the f (or v), although this sound development is atypical for the area.
