= West Hartlepool Lifeboat Station =

Former lifeboat station in County Durham, England

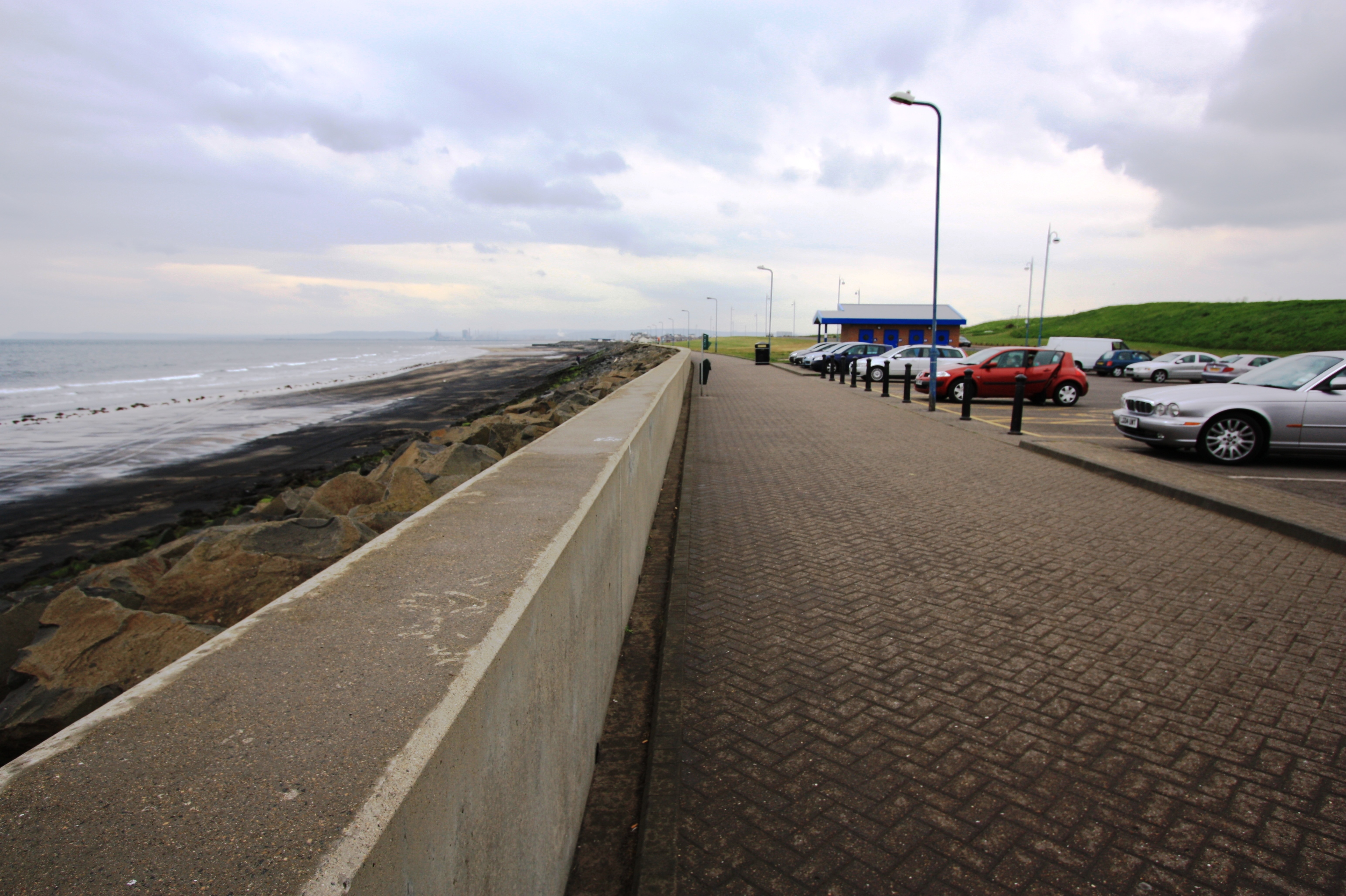
- Hartlepool Bay Promenade

- West Hartlepool, Co. Durham

General information
- Status: Closed
- Type: RNLI Lifeboat Station
- Location: West Hartlepool, County Durham,, England
- Coordinates: 54°40′38.3″N 1°11′52.9″W
- Opened: 1847
- Closed: 1906

West Hartlepool Lifeboat Station consisted of two lifeboat stations, located near to the harbour town of Hartlepool, in County Durham.

A lifeboat was first stationed to the south of the town in 1847 by the Hartlepool Dock and Railway Company at Stranton Beach, In 1854, a second lifeboat was placed near the Harbour Masters Office at Hartlepool Docks.

Both stations were transferred to the management of the Royal National Lifeboat Institution (RNLI) in 1869.

The No.1 station was closed in 1894, leaving the No.2 station as the primary station, until it too was closed in 1906.

== History ==
Under the Harbours, Docks and Piers Clauses Act 1847, companies operating Dock facilities were required by Act of parliament to provide a lifeboat, as directed:

Unless it be provided by the Special Act that the Undertakers need not provide Life-boats, the Undertakers, before they shall be entitled to take any Rates in respect of the Harbour, Dock, or Pier, shall provide and always thereafter maintain in good Repair an efficient and well-appointed Life-boat, a Manby Mortar, and a sufficient Supply of Carte's Rockets, or such other Mortar, and Rockets as the Lords of the Admiralty, by Writing under the Hand of the Secretary of the Admiralty, shall approve of, with all necessary Tackle, and a competent Crew and proper Persons for the effectual Working thereof for the Assistance and Succour of Vessels in distress; and the Undertakers shall cause such Life-boat, Mortar, and Rockets to be stationed at or upon the most advanced Works of the Harbour, Dock, or Pier, or such other Place as the Lords of the Admiralty shall approve of as aforesaid, and to be used on all necessary Occasions.

Thus it was in 1847, that West Hartlepool Lifeboat Station (No.1) was established at Stranton Beach, near to the West Hartlepool Iron Works overlooking Hartlepool Bay, by the Hartlepool Dock and Railway Company (later to become the West Hartlepool Harbour and Railway Company in 1853). A boathouse was constructed, and a 30-foot 12-oared lifeboat was built by John Cambridge of Hartlepool. In 1854, the boathouse at Stranton Beach was reconstructed, and a second lifeboat station (No.2) was established on the south side of the Hartlepool Dock lock gates, near the Harbour Masters Office, with an iron-rail slipway launching into the West Harbour. John Cambridge once again constructed the lifeboat, which was a 40-foot (18-oared) non-self-righting lifeboat, weighing 12 tons.

In 1857, the North Eastern Railway (NER) took over the operation of the West Hartlepool Harbour and Railway Company, and by 1869, they were looking to dispose of assets unrelated to their core operations. Both West Hartlepool lifeboats and stations were transferred to the management of the RNLI. The No. 2 boathouse at the docks was considered to be in a poor position on the beach, and was relocated inside the dock. The 40-foot lifeboat placed at the same station had never found favour with the crew. Weighing in at 12 tons, it was too heavy, and was replaced in 1869 with a 33-foot (10-oared) self-righting 'Pulling and Sailing' (P&S) lifeboat, one with oars and sails, built by Forrestt of Limehouse. Funded by the Ancient Order of Foresters, the boat was named Foresters Pride.

The RNLI received £400 in 1866, a bequest from the late James Davidson Shaw of Newcastle-upon-Tyne. In 1870, the monies were appropriated to the West Hartlepool No.1 station, and the previously unnamed 1847 lifeboat was duly named James Davidson Shaw. In 1874, the lifeboat Foresters Pride, previously at West Hartlepool No.2 station at the docks, was transferred to the No. 1 station to replace the 1847 lifeboat, and was renamed James Davidson Shaw. A new 34-foot 10-oared self-righting (P&S) lifeboat, built by Forrestt of Limehouse, costing £345, was placed at the No.2 Station, and again given the name Foresters Pride.

The West Hartlepool No.1 lifeboat James Davidson Shaw was launched at 23:15 on 5 February 1876 to the barque Emily of North Shields, showing signals of distress off the South Gare, at the entrance to the River Tees, whilst on passage to Carthagena, Spain. The lifeboat was towed to the vessel by the North Eastern Railway steam-tug Freedom. 13 of the 17 crew were rescued, and landed at Coatham. The four remaining crew, including the Master, were rescued by the Redcar lifeboat Burton-on-Trent at 06:00.

By 1879, it would appear that the funds provided by James Davidson Shaw had been used. New monies provided to the RNLI by the Rochdale Lifeboat Fund were appropriated to West Hartlepool, and the lifeboat was renamed for a second time, this time being the Rochdale.

October 28, 1880 was a disastrous day for shipping around the coast of the United Kingdom. According to the List of shipwrecks in October 1880, over 270 vessels were lost on one day. Many lifeboats were called out that day, and West Hartlepool would be no exception. Rochdale was launched to the aid of the schooner Royal Albert, driven ashore at West Hartlepool, whilst on passage from Southend-on-Sea. The crew of five were rescued by the lifeboat, before the vessel was wrecked against the pier.

West Hartlepool would see both lifeboats replaced in 1887. The No.1 station would receive a 34-foot (10-oared) self-righting (P&S) lifeboat, built by Forrestt, which again would be named Rochdale (ON 126). The No.2 station would receive a 34-foot 3in (10-oared) self-righting (P&S) lifeboat, built by Woolfe, and again would be named Foresters Pride (ON 162), the third lifeboat to carry the name.

Rochdale (ON 126) would serve for just seven years. The No.1 Station was closed in 1894, with the No.2 station becoming the primary West Hartlepool station. Rochdale (ON 126) would serve another eight years at other stations, before being used for demonstration purposes for the Lifeboat Saturday Fund.

On 25 March 1898, the lifeboat Forester's Pride (ON 162) launched to the aid of the schooner Johannes, of Großefehn, in difficulties in a strong E.N.E. wind in Hartlepool Bay. Five men were rescued, before the vessel stranded near the battery.

West Hartlepool (No.2) lifeboat station closed in 1906. The lifeboat on station, Forester's Pride (ON 162), was sold out of service.

== Station honours ==
The following are awards made at West Hartlepool.

- RNLI Silver Medal

Thomas Pounder, Pilot - 1890
James Metcalf, Assistant Pilot - 1890

== West Hartlepool lifeboats ==
=== No.1 Station (Beach) ===
54°40′38.3″N 1°11′52.9″W

ON (Note: ON is the RNLI's Official Number of the boat.)	Name	Built	On station	Class	Comments
Pre-219	Unnamed	1847	1847–1870	30-foot North Country	(Note: 30-foot x 10-foot 5in (12-oared) North Country non-self-righting lifeboat, built by John Cambridge of Hartlepool, costing £160.); Named James Davidson Shaw in 1870.
Pre-219	James Davidson Shaw	1847	1870–1874	30-foot North Country	
Pre-523	James Davidson Shaw	1869	1874–1879	33-foot Peake Self-righting (P&S)	(Note: Previously Foresters Pride at West Hartlepool No.2. Appropriated legacy of Mr J. D. Shaw of Newcastle upon Tyne in 1874.); Renamed Rochdale in 1879.
Pre-523	Rochdale	1869	1879–1887	33-foot Peake Self-righting (P&S)	(Note: Appropriated gift of the Rochdale LB fund, 1879.)
126	Rochdale	1887	1887–1894	34-foot Self-righting (P&S)	(Note: 34-foot x 8-foot (10-oared) self-righting (P&S) lifeboat, gift of the Rochdale LB fund, built by Forrestt of Limehouse, London, costing £480.)

No.1 Station closed 1894
Pre ON numbers are unofficial numbers used by the Lifeboat Enthusiast Society,
to reference early lifeboats not included on the official RNLI list.

=== No.2 Station (Dock) ===
54°41′24.4″N 1°11′54.2″W

ON	Name	Built	On station	Class	Comments
–	Unnamed	1854	1854–1869	40-foot North Country	(Note: 40-foot x 11-foot 3in (18-oared) North Country non-self-righting lifeboat, built by John Cambridge of Hartlepool.)
Pre-523	Foresters Pride	1869	1869–1874	33-foot Peake Self-righting (P&S)	(Note: 33-foot x 8-foot 6in (10-oared) self-righting (P&S) lifeboat, gift of Ancient Order of Foresters, built by Forrestt of Limehouse, London, costing £276.); Moved to West Hartlepool No.1 in 1874, and renamed James Davidson Shaw.
Pre-588	Foresters Pride	1874	1874–1887	34-foot Self-righting (P&S)	(Note: 34-foot x 8-foot 9in (10-oared) self-righting (P&S) lifeboat, gift of Ancient Order of Foresters, built by Forrestt of Limehouse, London, costing £345.)
162	Forester's Pride	1887	1887–1906	34-foot Self-righting (P&S)	(Note: 34-foot x 8-foot (10-oared) self-righting (P&S) lifeboat, gift of Ancient Order of Foresters, built by Woolfe of Shadwell, London, costing £385.)

No.2 Station Closed 1906

=== No.3 Station ===
ON	Name	Built	On station	Class	Comments
127	Speedwell	1887	1902–1903	34-foot Self-Righting (P&S)	(Note: 34-foot x 8-foot (10-oared) self-righting (P&S) lifeboat, gift of Miss J. Houghton of Roehampton, built by Forrestt of Limehouse, London, costing £480.); Previously at Porthcawl.

== See also ==
- List of RNLI stations
- List of former RNLI stations
- Royal National Lifeboat Institution lifeboats
