= Westermoor =

- Municipality
- Coat of arms

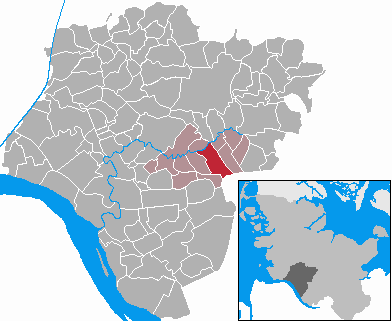
- Location of Westermoor within Steinburg district
- Interactive map of Westermoor
- Location within Germany Location within Schleswig-Holstein
- Coordinates: 53°55′N 9°37′E
- Country: Germany
- State: Schleswig-Holstein
- District: Steinburg
- Municipal assoc.: Breitenburg

Government
  - Mayor: Peter Pfahl

Area
  - Total: 9.44 km^{2} (3.64 sq mi)
- Elevation: 1 m (3.3 ft)

Population (2025-12-31)
  - Total: 391
  - Density: 41.4/km^{2} (107/sq mi)
- Time zone: UTC+01:00 (CET)
  - Summer (DST): UTC+02:00 (CEST)
- Postal codes: 25597
- Dialling codes: 04828
- Vehicle registration: IZ
- Website: www.amt-breitenburg.de

Westermoor is a municipality in the district of Steinburg, in Schleswig-Holstein, Germany.

== See also ==
- Moordorf
