= Porthcawl Lifeboat Station =

RNLI lifeboat station in Bridgend County Borough, Wales

- Gorsaf Bad Achub Porthcawl

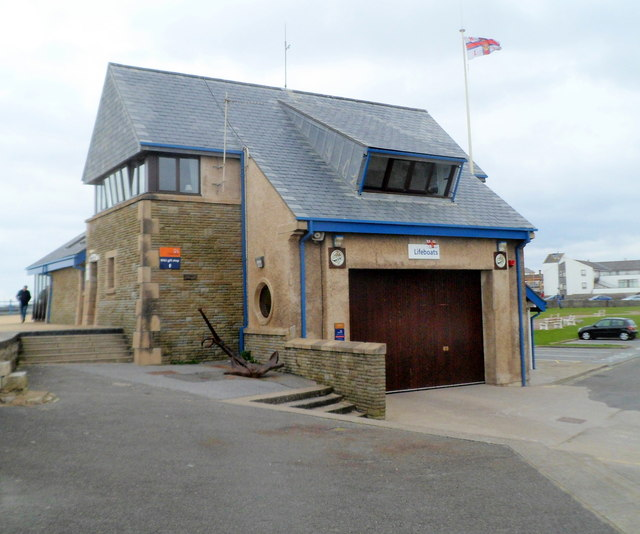
- Porthcawl Lifeboat Station

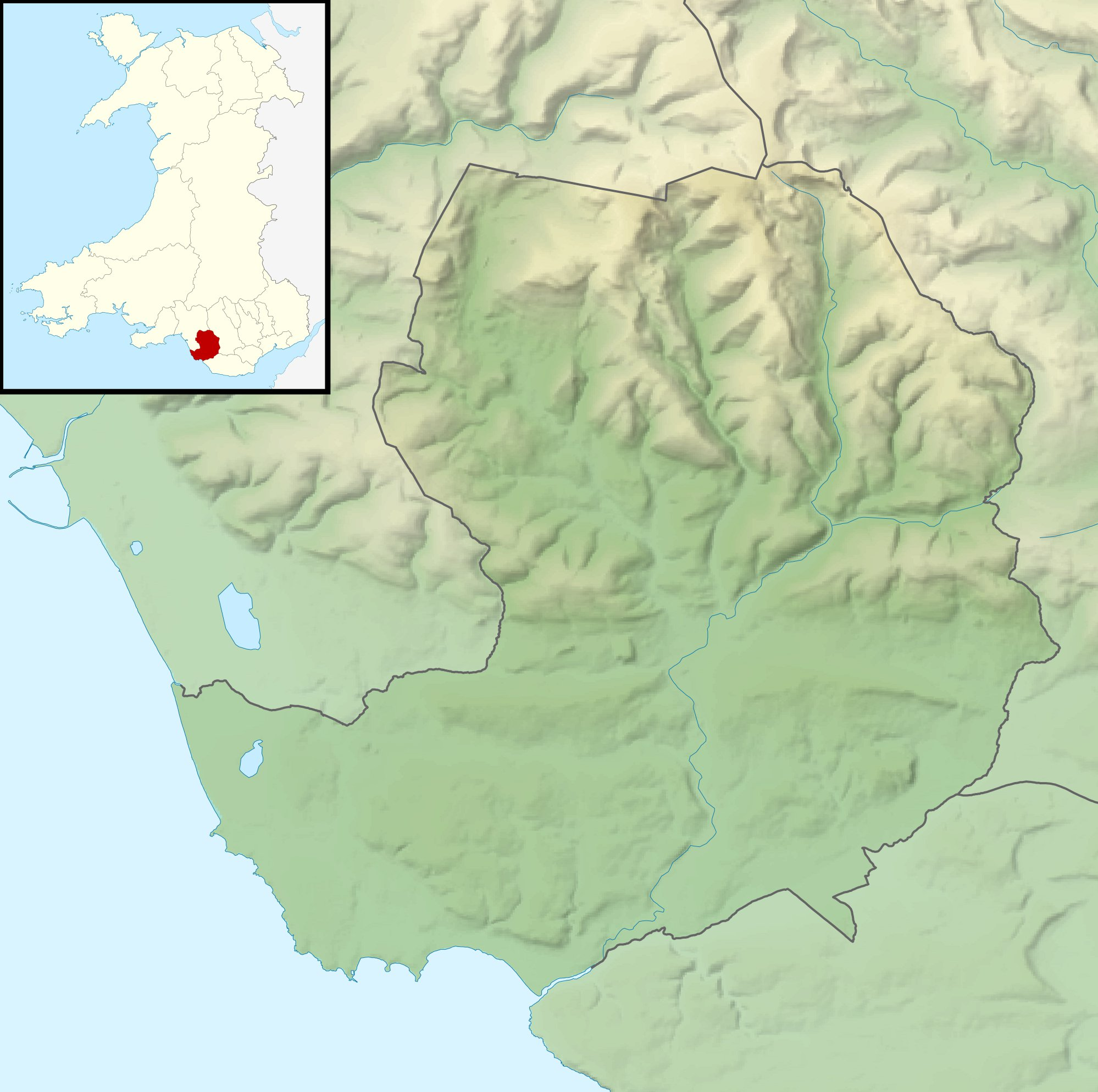
- Location within Bridgend

General information
- Type: RNLI Lifeboat Station
- Location: The Esplanade, Porthcawl, Bridgend, Wales, CF36 3YR, United Kingdom
- Coordinates: 51°28′26″N 3°42′06″W
- Opened: 1860–1902; 1965–present
- Owner: Royal National Lifeboat Institution

Website
- Porthcawl RNLI Lifeboat Station

Porthcawl Lifeboat Station (Welsh: Gorsaf Bad Achub Porthcawl) is located at The Esplanade, in the town of Porthcawl, on the South Wales coast, in Bridgend, Wales.

A lifeboat station was established at Porthcawl in 1860, by the Royal National Lifeboat Institution (RNLI), but closed in 1902, when Porthcawl Dock closed. The station was reopened in 1965 as an Inshore Lifeboat Station.

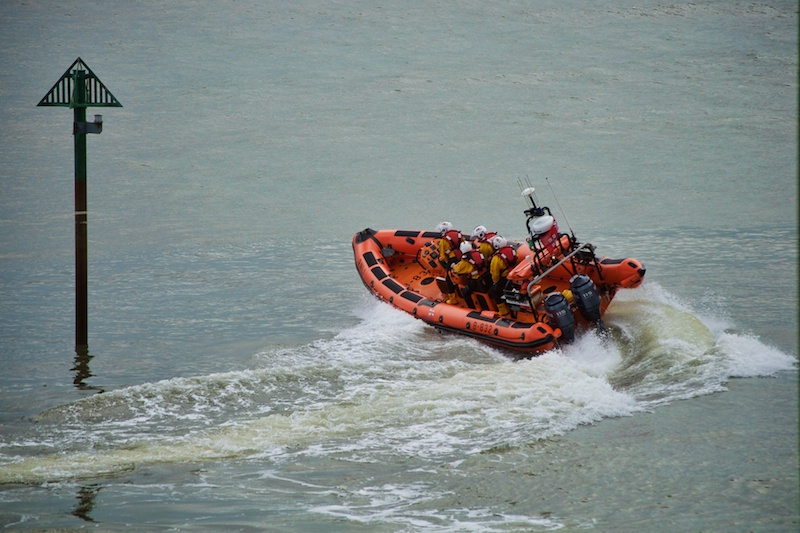
Porthcawl B-class (Atlantic 85) Rose of the Shires (B-832)

The station currently operates a B-class (Atlantic 85) Inshore lifeboat, Rose of the Shires (B-832), on station since 2009, and the smaller D-class (IB1) lifeboat, Hugo Missen (D-861), on station since 2022.

== History ==
Ever since its founding in 1824, the Royal National Institution for the Preservation of Life from Shipwreck (RNIPLS), later to become the RNLI in 1854, would award medals for deeds of gallantry at sea, even if no lifeboats were involved. In just a four-year period between 1856 and 1860, no fewer than nine RNLI Silver Medals were awarded for rescues in the Porthcawl area.

At a meeting of the RNLI committee of management on Thursday 6 October 1859, following a visit and recommendation by the RNLI District Inspector, and in receipt of a letter from Capt. Crewe Read and Rev. E. P. Nicholl, highlighting the need for a lifeboat on the Glamorganshire coast, it was decided that a station be established at Porthcawl.

The station opened in April 1860, when the 30-foot self-righting 'pulling and sailing' (P&S) lifeboat, one with (6) oars and sails, The Good Deliverance, was placed here. A boathouse costing £120 was constructed on the promenade, at the entrance to Knights Arms Square.

On 5 December 1869, the Porthcawl lifeboat rescued 11 crew, the Master's wife, and the Pilot, from the schooner Loretta of Bilbao.

After 12 years service, the 6-oared lifeboat was replaced in 1872. The lifeboat had been launched 17 times, saving 26 lives.

A larger 32-foot 10-oared lifeboat, costing £248, along with a new launch carriage, at a further cost of £100, was provided to the station. The expenses were covered by the donation of £680 from Miss J. E. Chafyn Grove of Wiltshire, in memory of her brother, a benefactor of the Institution. The lifeboat arrived in March 1872, and after a procession to Newton Sands, avoiding heavy snowstorms on the day, the lifeboat was named Chafyn Grove by the donor.

The existing boathouse was enlarged, and a harness room was also included, to store equipment, for the six horses needed to launch and recover the lifeboat. The Chafyn Grove would serve until 1887, launching eight times, and saving the lives of 28 people.

In 1887 the station received another new lifeboat, Speedwell (ON 127). The lifeboat was funded by an anonymous gift of £700 from a 'Lady'. The lifeboat was used very little in the following 15 years, with only nine launches, and two lives saved.

Porthcawl Lifeboat Station was closed in 1902, due to the cessation of commercial traffic to the Docks. Since the majority of the lifeboat launches were for commercial traffic, it was deemed unnecessary to have a lifeboat station, and the boathouse was sold. The lifeboat on station at the time of closure, Speedwell (ON 127), was transferred to West Hartlepool, but served just one year, before being broken up in 1904.

In 1965, the RNLI re-established a station at Porthcawl, and placed a D-class (RFD PB16) Inshore lifeboat on service. This lifeboat was one of the first D-class lifeboats, designed to give a rapid response to recreational water users around the coast. Due to the RNLI selling the old boathouse, the new lifeboat was housed in a lean-to, next to Jennings building, and the crew were recruited using adverts in the local press.

On 30 December 1994, the station was alerted to a windsurfer in difficulty, caught in a riptide. Even thought the conditions were well beyond the operational limits of the D-class (EA16), Tiger D (D-390) was launched with experience helm Stuart Roberts, along with Carl Evans and Wayne Evans. When the surfer was finally pulled aboard, he was still attached to his board by an elastic cord, which shot into the lifeboat, hitting Roberts on his 'bump cap', which was dented. Helm Stuart Ian Roberts was awarded the RNLI Silver Medal.

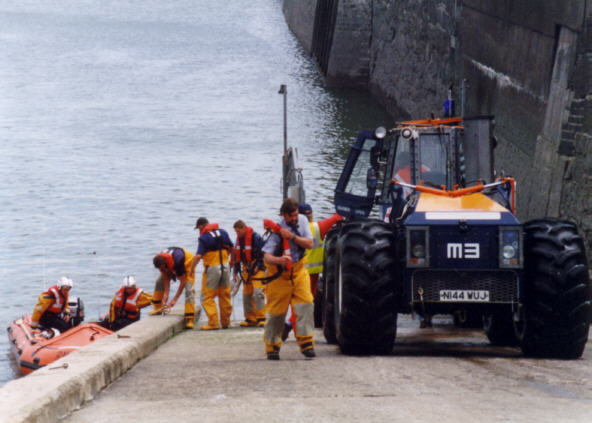
Porthcawl Tractor in use on the RNLI Slipway in Porthcawl

In 1996, it was decided that Porthcawl needed a larger lifeboat and a new, purpose built boathouse was constructed to house a brand new B-class (Atlantic 75) lifeboat, along with a new Talus MB-4H Hydrostatic launch tractor and Talus Atlantic Drive Off / Drive On launch carriage.

In 2022, D-class (IB1) lifeboat (D-861) Hugo Missen replaced relief lifeboat (D-776) Super G II, based at Porthcawl since 2020. The lifeboat was named in memory of Hugo Joseph Missen, son of Helm Joseph Missen and his fiancé Jessica Entwistle, who died of cancer in December 2016 aged 15 months. Hugo was also the grandson of Porthcawl RNLI’s Lifeboat Operations Manager, Philip Missen MBE.

== Station honours ==
The following are awards made at Porthcawl:

- RNLI Silver Medal
  Capt. Charles Taw, of the schooner Devonport – 1856
  John Jones, Pilot – 1857
  James Pearse, Pilot – 1857
  Thomas Pearse, Pilot – 1857
  George Clark, Pilot – 1857
  James Collopy, Boatman, H.M. Coastguard, Porthcawl – 1858
  Daniel Shea, Chief Officer, H.M. Coastguard, Porthcawl – 1858
  Christopher Rice Mansel Talbot, MP - 1860
  John Williams, Farmer - 1860
  Daniel P. Davies, Pilot's Apprentice – 1914
  Stuart Roberts, Helm – 1995
- RNLI Bronze Medal
  William H. B. Cotton – 1929
  Nick Beale, Helm – 2002
  Aileen Jones, Helm – 2004

(Aileen was the first female lifeboat crew member to be awarded an RNLI medal.)

- The Maud Smith Award 1994
  (for the bravest act of lifesaving during the year by a member of a lifeboat crew)
  Stuart Roberts, Helm – 1995
- Lady Swaythling Trophy
  presented by The Shipwrecked Fishermen and Mariners' Royal Benevolent Society, for outstanding seamanship
  Nick Beale, Helm – 2002
- Emile Robins Award
  presented by The Shipwrecked Fishermen and Mariners' Royal Benevolent Society
  Aileen Jones, Helm – 2004 (first female recipient of the award)
- The Walter and Elizabeth Groombridge Award
  for the outstanding inshore lifeboat rescue of the year
  Nick Beale, Helm – 2002
- The Thanks of the Institution inscribed on Vellum
  Carl Evans, crew member – 1995
  Wayne Evans, crew member – 1995
  Timothy Morgan, Helm – 2002
  Riccardo Rava, crew member – 2002
  Stephen Knipe, crew member – 2002
  Simon Emms, crew member – 2004
- A Framed Letter of Thanks signed by the Chairman of the Institution
  L. S. Knipe – 1968
  J. Lock – 1968
  R. A. Comley – 1968
  John Williams, Honorary Secretary – 1995
  Philip Missen, Helm – 1997
  Steve Jones, crew member – 1997
  Philip Missen, Helm – 1998
  Ross Martin, crew member – 1998
  Riccardo Rava, crew member – 2002
  Carl Evans, crew member – 2002
  Stephen Jones, Helm – 2002
  Christopher Missen, Helm – 2020
- Commendation by the Lifesaving Operations Director of the Institution
  Christopher Kitney, crew member – 2020
  Angharad Masson, crew member – 2020
  Ryan Lecraw, crew member – 2020
- Member, Order of the British Empire (MBE)
  Philip Leonard Missen, Inshore Lifeboat Crew – 1998QBH
  Christine Aileen Jones – 2016QBH
- British Empire Medal
  Ian Stroud, Chair, Porthcawl Lifeboat Management Group – 2026KBH

== Porthcawl lifeboats ==
=== Pulling and Sailing (P&S) lifeboats ===
ON (Note: ON is the RNLI's Official Number of the boat.)	Name	Built	On station	Class	Comments
Pre-361	The Good Deliverance	1860	1860–1871	30-foot Peake Self-Righting (P&S)	(Note: 30-foot x 7-foot (6-oared) Peake-class self-righting (P&S) lifeboat, gift of Lady Cotton Sheppard, built by Forrest of Limehouse, London, costing £148.); Capsized 1866. Renamed Brave Robert Shedden in 1871.
Pre-361	Brave Robert Shedden	1860	1871–1872	30-foot Peake Self-Righting (P&S)	(Note: Legacy of Mrs W. Sheddon of Newcastle upon Tyne.); Sold in 1872.
Pre-567	Chafyn Grove	1872	1872–1887	32-foot Prowse Self-Righting (P&S)	(Note: 32-foot x 7-foot 10in (10-oared) Prowse-class self-righting (P&S) lifeboat, legacy of Miss J. E. C. Grove of Zeals, Wiltshire, built by Forrest of Limehouse, London, costing £248.); Broken up in 1887.
127	Speedwell	1887	1887–1902	34-foot Self-Righting (P&S)	(Note: 34-foot x 8-foot (10-oared) self-righting (P&S) lifeboat, gift of Miss J. Houghton of Roehampton, built by Forrest of Limehouse, London, costing £480.); Transferred to West Hartlepool.

Station closed in 1902
Pre ON numbers are unofficial numbers used by the Lifeboat Enthusiasts' Society to reference early lifeboats not included on the official RNLI list.

=== Inshore lifeboats ===
==== D-class ====
Op. No. (Note: Op. No. is the RNLI's Operational Number of the boat carried on the hull.)	Name	On station	Class	Comments
D-52	Unnamed	1965–1970	D-class (RFD PB16)	
D-174	Unnamed	1970–1983	D-class (RFD PB16)	
D-291	Donald Rigby Middleton	1983–1989	D-class (RFD PB16)	
D-390	Tiger D	1989–1996	D-class (EA16)	
D-class lifeboat withdrawn 1996, reinstated 2012
D-714	Jean Ryall	2012–2020	D-class (IB1)	
D-776	Super G II	2020–2022	D-class (IB1)	
D-861	Hugo Missen	2022–	D-class (IB1)	Our Buoy Hugo's Fund

==== B-class ====
Op. No.	Name	On station	Class	Comments
B-549	Blenwatch	1996	B-class (Atlantic 21)	
B-726	Giles	1996–2009	B-class (Atlantic 75)	
B-832	Rose of the Shires	2009–	B-class (Atlantic 85)	

=== Launch and recovery tractors ===
Op. No.	Reg. No.	Type	On station	Comments
TW29Hc	N144 WUJ	Talus MB-4H Hydrostatic (Mk2)	1996–2008	
TW27Hc	M741 RUX	Talus MB-4H Hydrostatic (Mk2)	2008–2015	
TW29Hc	N144 WUJ	Talus MB-4H Hydrostatic (Mk2)	2015–	

== See also ==
- List of RNLI stations
- List of former RNLI stations
- Royal National Lifeboat Institution lifeboats
- Talus Atlantic 85 DO-DO launch carriage
