= Victorbur =

- Village of Südbrookmerland
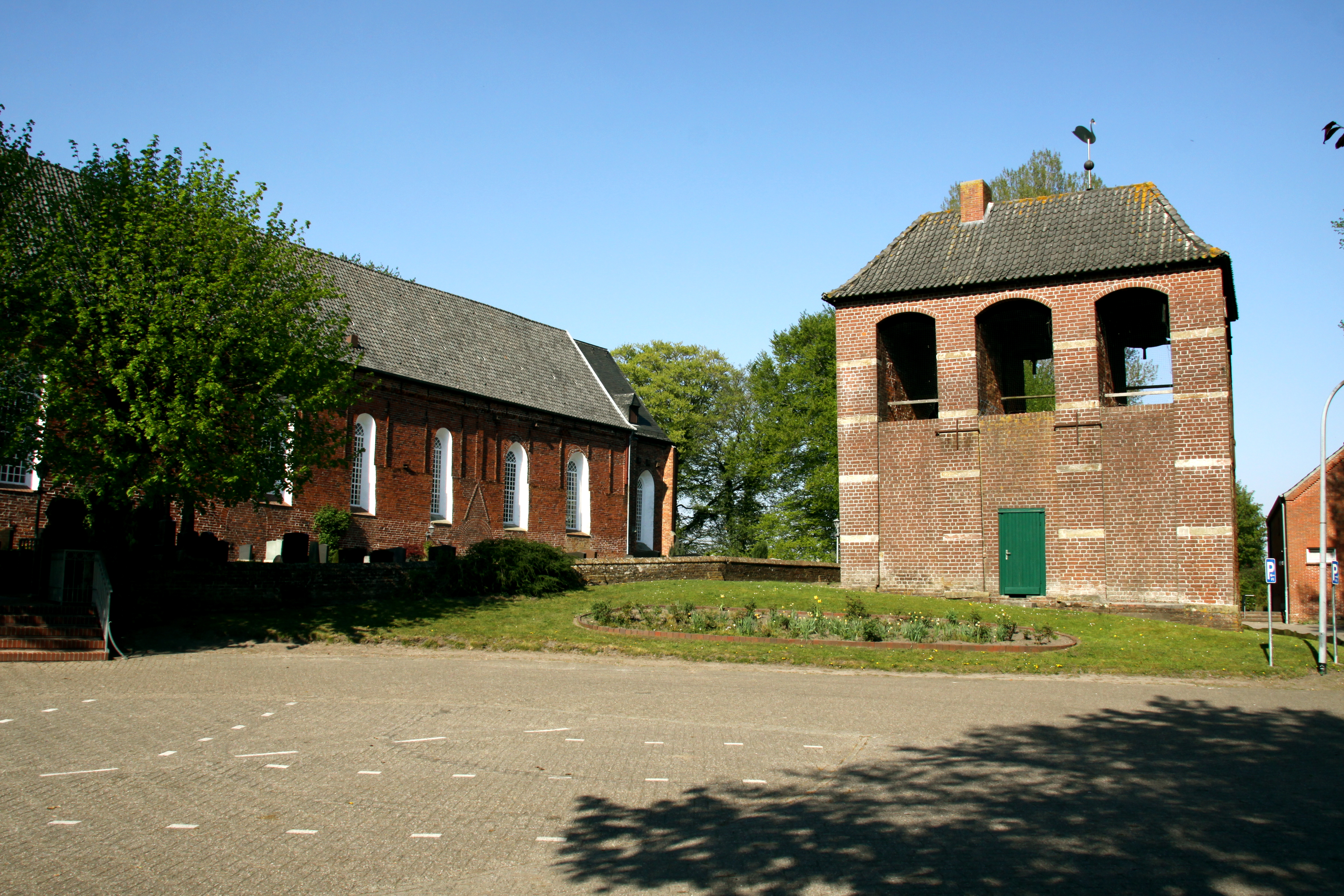
- St. Victor Church

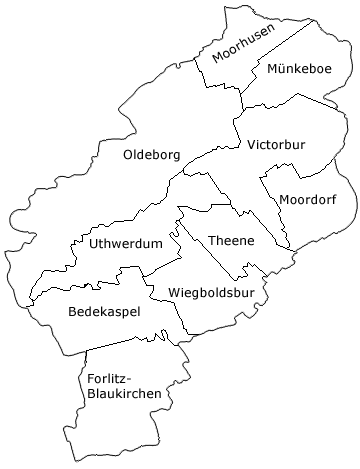
- Ortsteile of Südbrookmerland
- Interactive map of Victorbur
- Location within Germany Location within Lower Saxony
- Coordinates: 53.49264°N 7.35835°E
- Country: Germany
- State: Lower Saxony
- District: Aurich
- Municipality: Südbrookmerland

Area
  - Metro: 12.11 km^{2} (4.68 sq mi)
- Elevation: 2 m (6.6 ft)

Population
  - Metro: 4,140
- Time zone: UTC+01:00 (CET)
  - Summer (DST): UTC+02:00 (CEST)
- Dialling codes: 04942
- Vehicle registration: 26624

Victorbur (Low German: Vitterbur) is an East Frisian village in Lower Saxony, Germany. It is an Ortsteil and the seat of the municipality of Südbrookmerland, located directly to the north of Moordorf.

Victorbur was an independent municipality until it was incorporated into the municipality of Südbrookmerland on 1 July 1972.

== Etymology ==
The place name is derived from Viktor of Xanten, who is venerated in the local church. This saint was one of the soldiers of the legendary Theban Legion and was often venerated together with the soldiers Gereon and Mauritius. An early place name is St. Victoris-Hofe (1251, 1276), "the district dedicated to Saint Victor". Victor-Bur can be translated as "the farming community that is dedicated to the veneration of Saint Victor". The Low German version Vitterbur is still widely used today.
