= Moorhusen, Südbrookmerland =

Moorhusen
- Village of Südbrookmerland
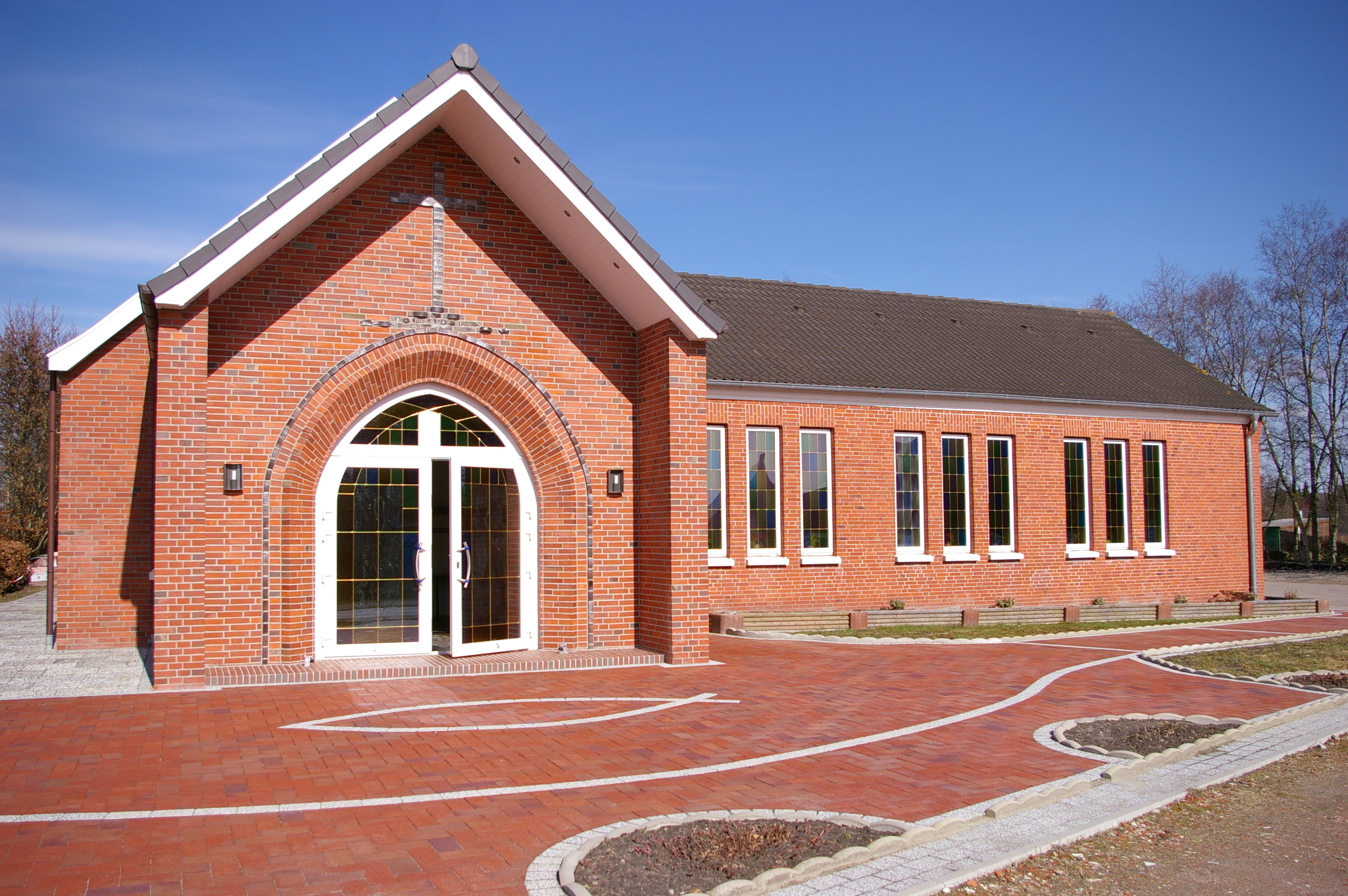
- Baptist Chapel

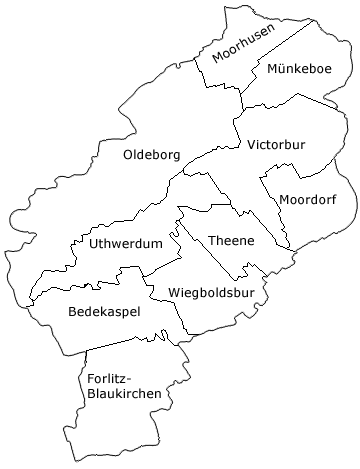
- Ortsteile of Südbrookmerland
- Interactive map of Moorhusen
- Location within Germany Location within Lower Saxony
- Coordinates: 53.52298°N 7.35909°E
- Country: Germany
- State: Lower Saxony
- District: Aurich
- Municipality: Südbrookmerland
- Elevation: 2 m (6.6 ft)

Population
  - Metro: 1,349
- Time zone: UTC+01:00 (CET)
  - Summer (DST): UTC+02:00 (CEST)
- Dialling codes: 04942, 04934
- Vehicle registration: 26624

Moorhusen is an East Frisian village in Lower Saxony, Germany. It is an Ortsteil of the municipality of Südbrookmerland. It is located approximately two kilometers southeast of the village of Rechtsupweg.

Moorhusen was an independent municipality until it was incorporated into the municipality of Südbrookmerland on 1 July 1972.

== Etymology ==
Moorhusen was first mentioned in 1787 as Moorhuesen and has been recorded in its current spelling since 1823. The name corresponds to the Low German form of Moorhausen, which means "houses in the moor".
