= Südbrookmerland =

- Municipality
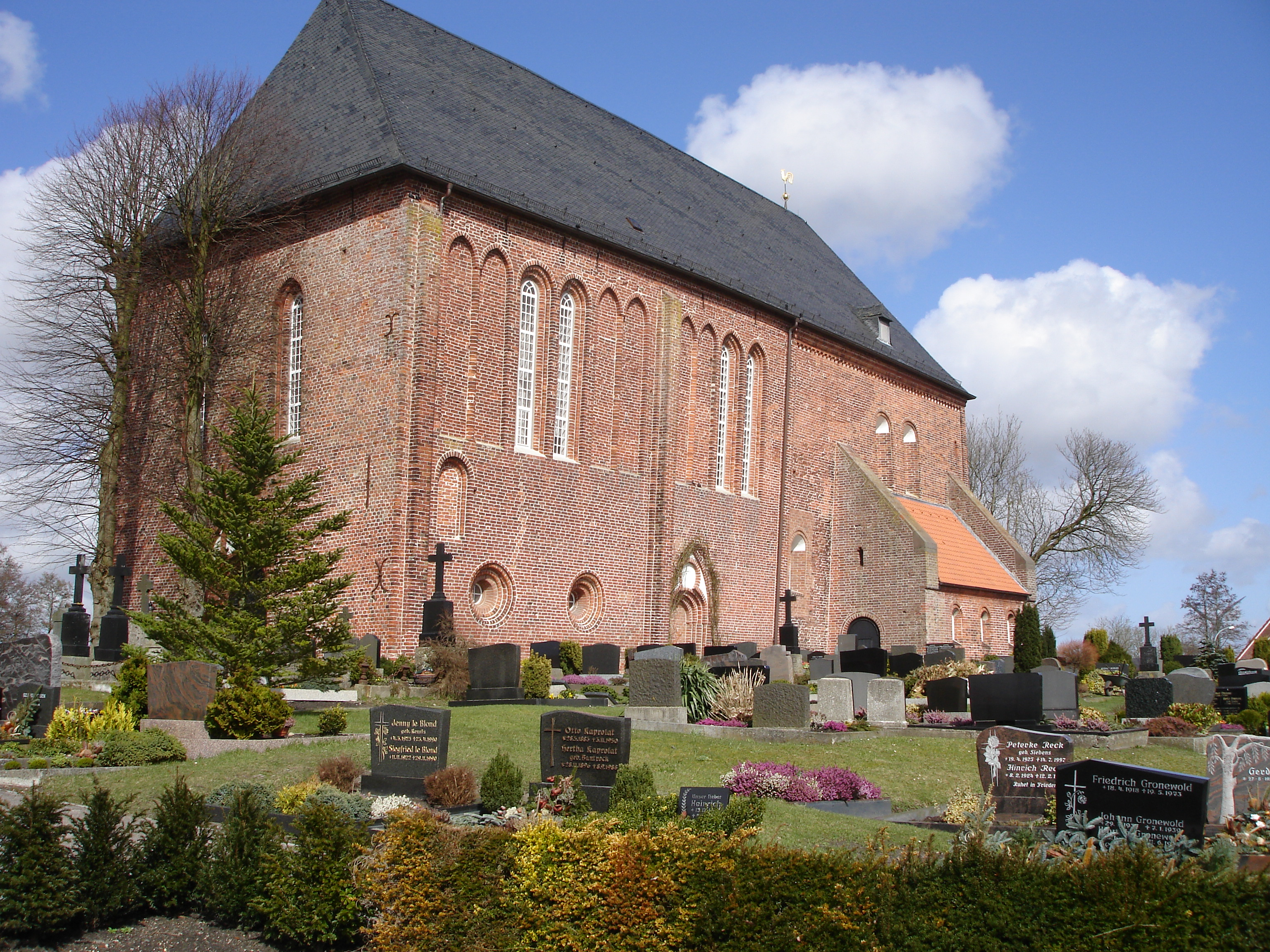
- St. John the Baptist Church (Engerhafe)

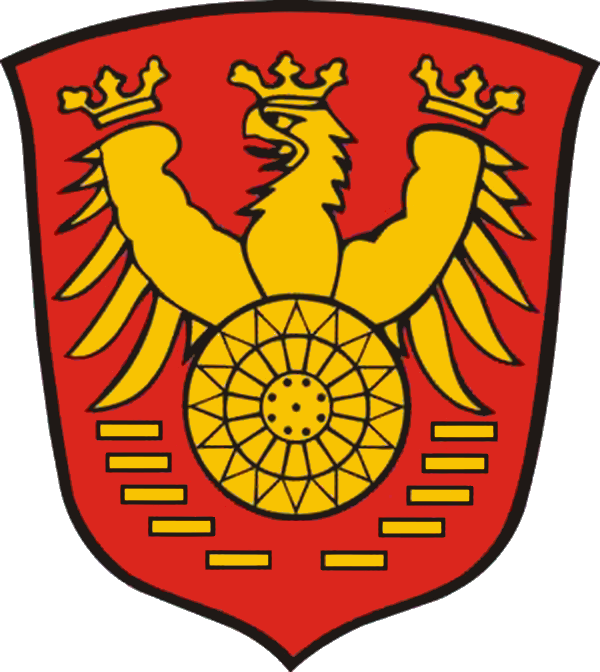
- Flag Coat of arms

- Location of Südbrookmerland within Aurich district
- Interactive map of Südbrookmerland
- Location within Germany Location within Lower Saxony
- Coordinates: 53°28′31″N 7°23′58″E
- Country: Germany
- State: Lower Saxony
- District: Aurich
- Subdivisions: 10 districts

Government
  - Mayor (2021–26): Thomas Erdwiens (Ind.)

Area
  - Total: 96.82 km^{2} (37.38 sq mi)
- Elevation: 3 m (9.8 ft)

Population (2025-12-31)
  - Total: 18,373
  - Density: 189.8/km^{2} (491.5/sq mi)
- Time zone: UTC+01:00 (CET)
  - Summer (DST): UTC+02:00 (CEST)
- Postal codes: 26624
- Dialling codes: 04942
- Vehicle registration: AUR
- Website: www.suedbrookmerland.de

Südbrookmerland (German pronunciation: [ˈzyːtˌbʁoːkmɐlant], lit. 'South Brookmerland') is a municipality in the district of Aurich, in Lower Saxony, Germany. It is situated approximately 7 km west of Aurich. Its seat is in the village Victorbur.

== Subdivisions ==
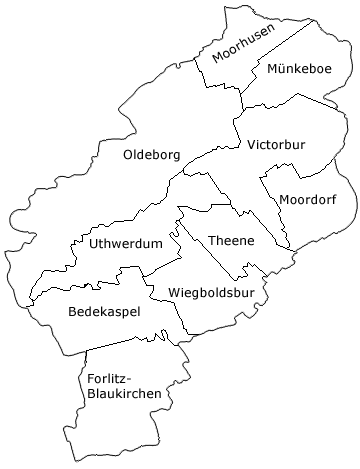
Subdivisions of Südbrookmerland

Südbrookmerland is divided into ten districts (Ortsteile), namely:

- Bedekaspel
- Forlitz-Blaukirchen
- Moordorf
- Moorhusen
- Münkeboe
- Oldeborg
- Theene
- Uthwerdum
- Victorbur
- Wiegboldsbur
