= Moordorf (Westermoor) =

- Village of Westermoor
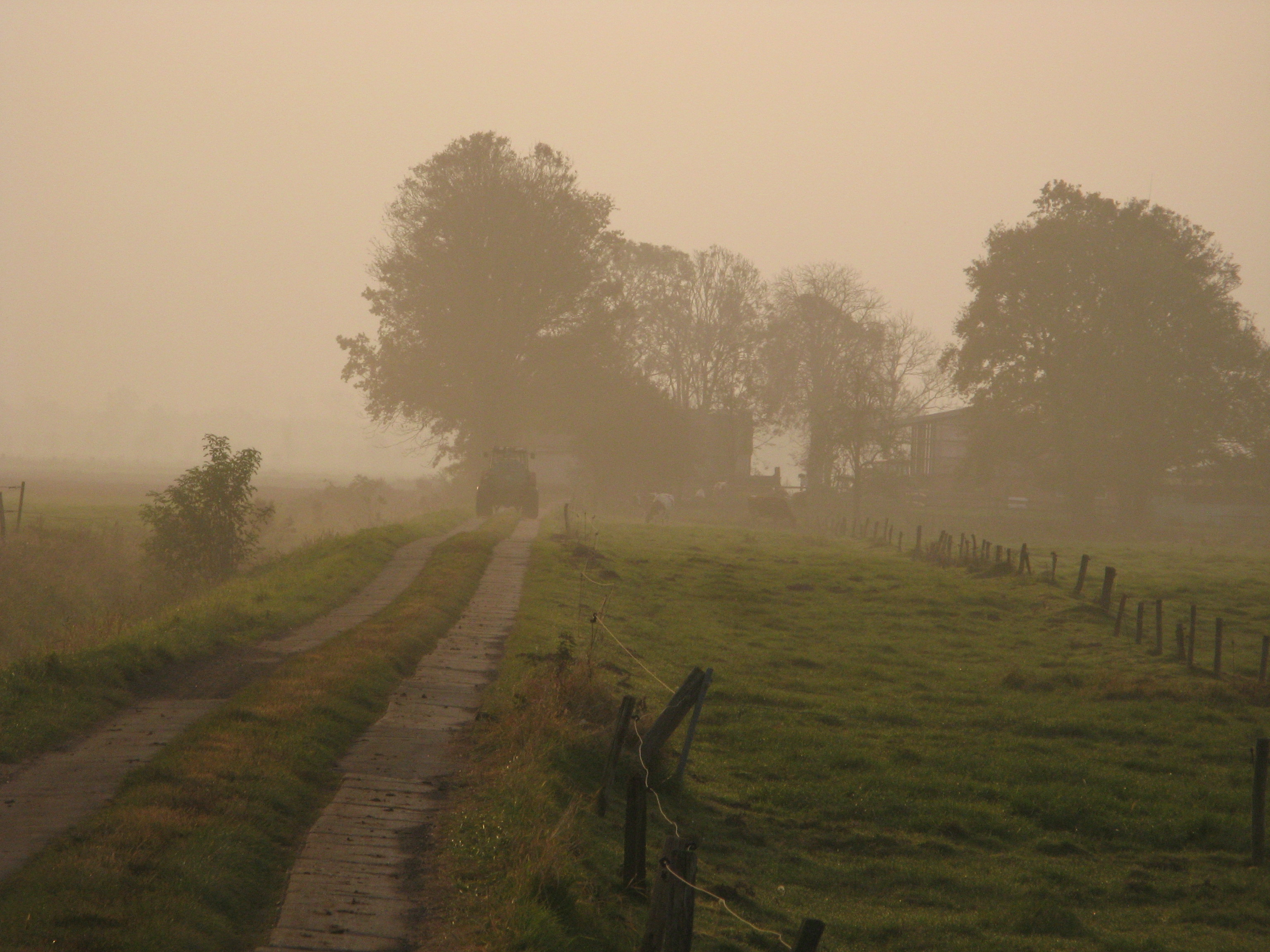
- The fields around Moordorf
- Coat of arms
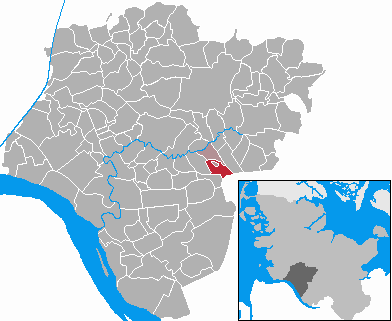
- Location of Moordorf within Westermoor municipality and Steinburg district
- Interactive map of Moordorf
- Location within Germany Location within Schleswig-Holstein
- Coordinates: 53°54′00″N 09°37′00″E
- Country: Germany
- State: Schleswig-Holstein
- District: Steinburg
- Town: Westermoor
- Elevation: 3 m (9.8 ft)

Population (2007)
  - Total: 24
- Time zone: UTC+01:00 (CET)
  - Summer (DST): UTC+02:00 (CEST)
- Postal codes: 25597
- Dialling codes: 04828
- Vehicle registration: IZ

Moordorf is a former municipality in the district of Steinburg, in Schleswig-Holstein, Germany. On March 1, 2008, Moordorf was incorporated into Westermoor.
