= Wiegboldsbur =

- Village of Südbrookmerland
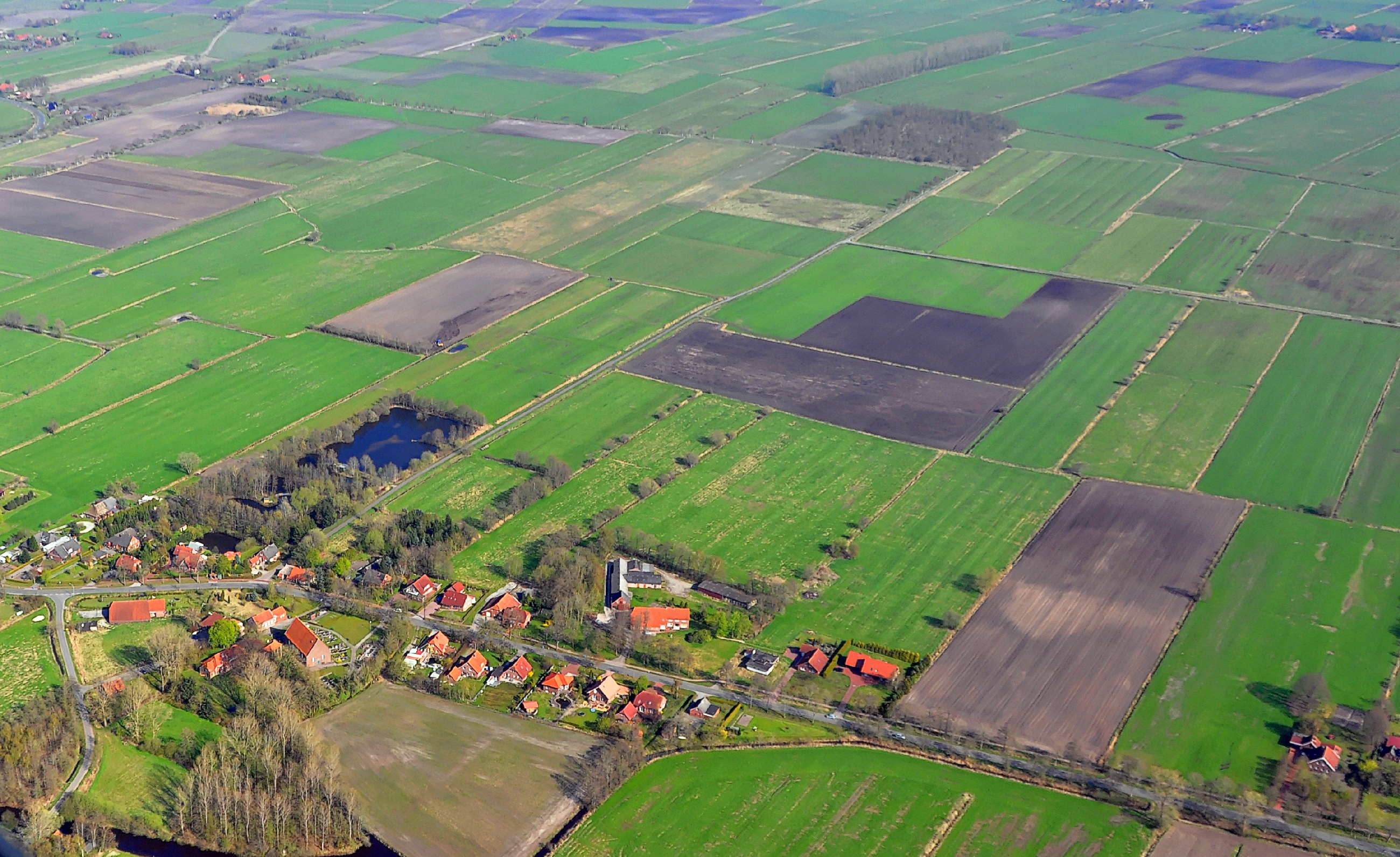
- Aerial view of Wiegboldsbur

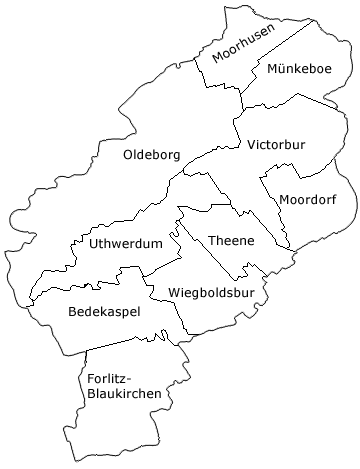
- Ortsteile of Südbrookmerland
- Interactive map of Wiegboldsbur
- Location within Germany Location within Lower Saxony
- Coordinates: 53.45631°N 7.34510°E
- Country: Germany
- State: Lower Saxony
- District: Aurich
- Municipality: Südbrookmerland

Population
  - Metro: 508
- Time zone: UTC+01:00 (CET)
  - Summer (DST): UTC+02:00 (CEST)
- Dialling codes: 04942
- Vehicle registration: 26624

The formerly independent village of Wiegboldsbur (East Frisian Low Saxon: Wiebelsbur) in East Frisia in North Germany has been part of the municipality of Südbrookmerland since the regional reform of 1972. Wiegboldsbur is a ribbon development (Reihensiedlung) and lies on the Großes Meer about 10 km northwest of the seaport of Emden. The parish chair is Bernhard Behrends (SPD).

== History ==
Wiegboldsbur is one of the oldest settlements in East Frisia. The name Wiboldesholte was mentioned in the abbey registers of Werden Abbey. Other old documents refer to the settlement as: Wilboldeswolde, Wibolduskeriken, Wibbodeshoff, Wiboldeshoff and Wibaldinga. The name Wibelsburen is also found on a church baptismal vessel dating to the year 1496.

In the Brokmerbrief, a 13th-century law book for the Brocmanni tribe, i.e. the inhabitants of the area west of Aurich cultivated until the end of the 12th century, it says in the 218th section (Küre): "The Brok people pass this law: that there be no hired retinue within the parish of Wigboldsbur under penalty of 8 marks and forfeiture of the house." The ban on a hired retinue (gedungenes Gefolge = mercenaries) implied that the parish of Wigboldsbur was a place under special protection. It can be presumed therefore that the court of Brokmerland was located here. Because such courts were almost always located near churches, justice was probably dispensed for the inhabitants of the Brokmerland near the church. Today there is still a neck iron for the pranger on the church wall.

== Places of interest ==
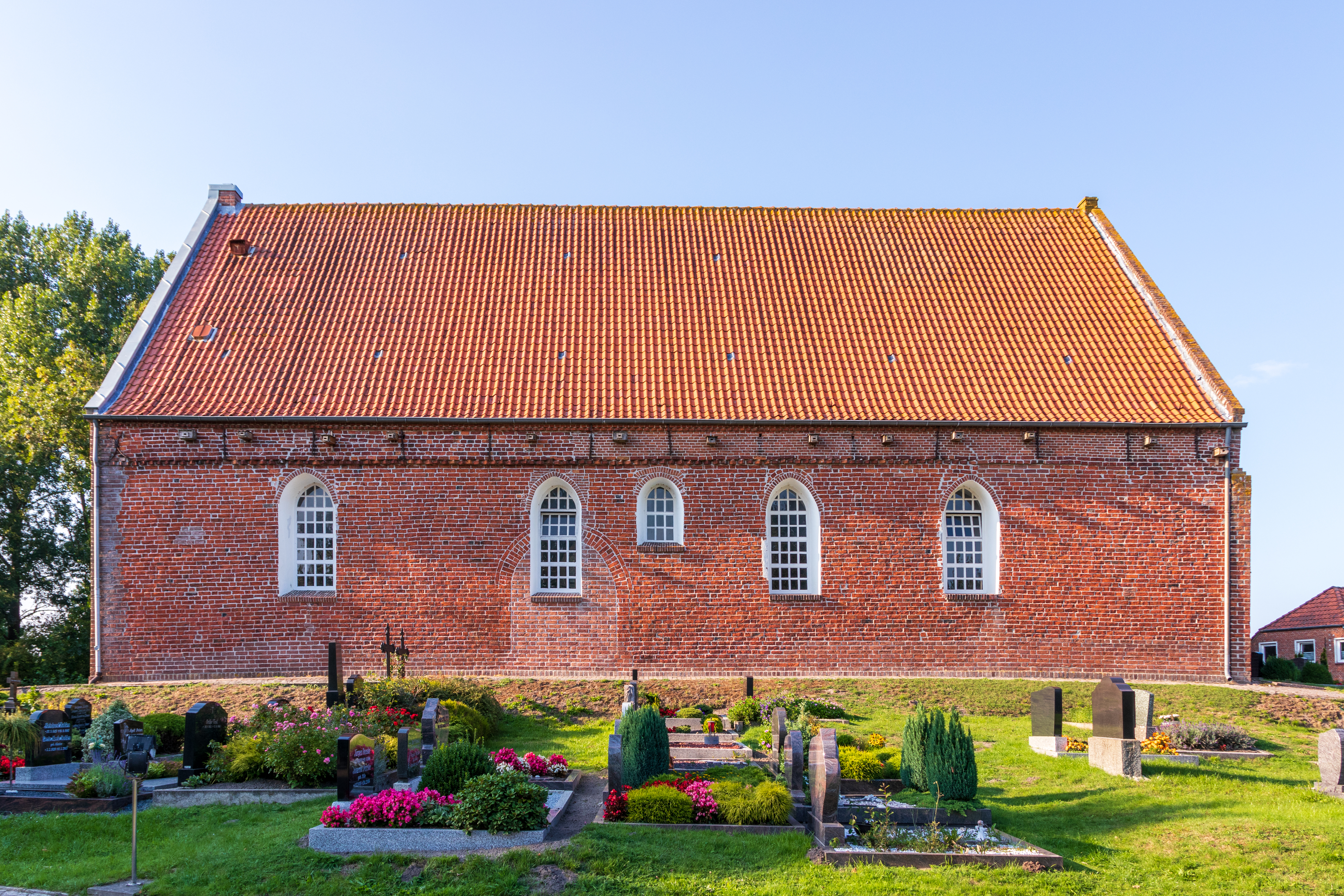
Wibadi Church

The Wibadi Church was built around 1250 on a warf, an artificial dwelling hill, on foundations 1.15 m deep. A wooden church had previously stood on the same spot but had burned down. The brick church belongs to the 7 "sending churches" (Sendkirchen) and therefore to the oldest churches in the Brokmerland. The organ was built in 1818/19 by Wilhelm Eilert Schmid and has 8 stops; it has been preserved almost in its original state. Since 1985 the old clock tower has once again had two church bells, after one had been melted down during the First World War. It is not known when the church was given its name or who Wibadus was.

"Experience nature - understand nature" ("Natur erleben - Natur verstehen") is the motto of NABU's educational farm at Woldenhof where, since 2002 school classes and youth groups have had the opportunity to experience for themselves, near-natural agriculture on the East Frisian Gulf farmhouse, a listed building from the year 1858. In the immediate neighbourhood of Woldenhof (Wolde - East Frisian Frisio-Saxon for woel = "marsh") stands the Wiegboldsbur windmill, which is maintained by volunteers and may be seen every Friday afternoon free of charge. It is a three-storey tower mill (Galerieholländer) from 1812 with a fantail and spring sails (Jalousieklappen).

== Gallery ==
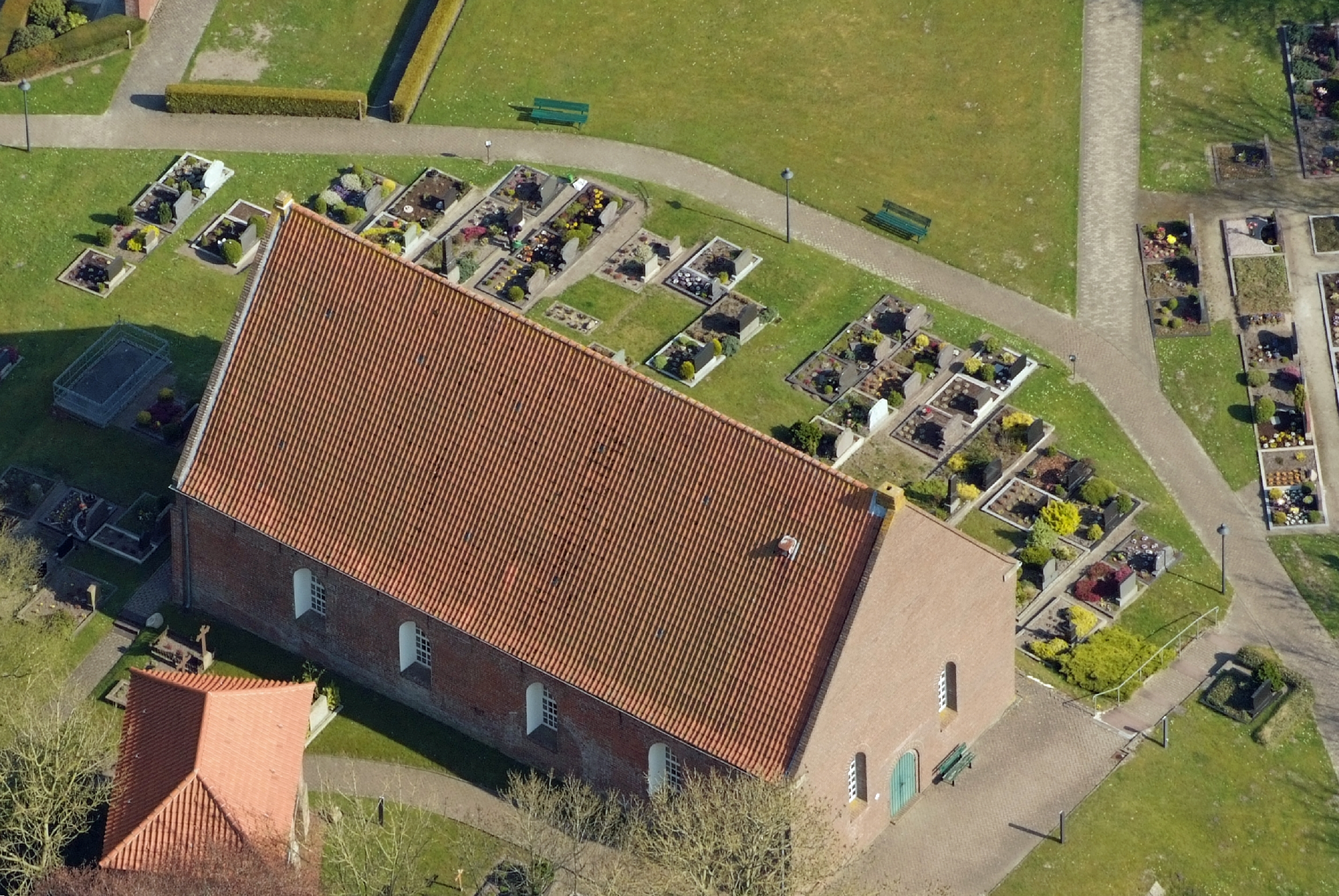
Aerial view of the church

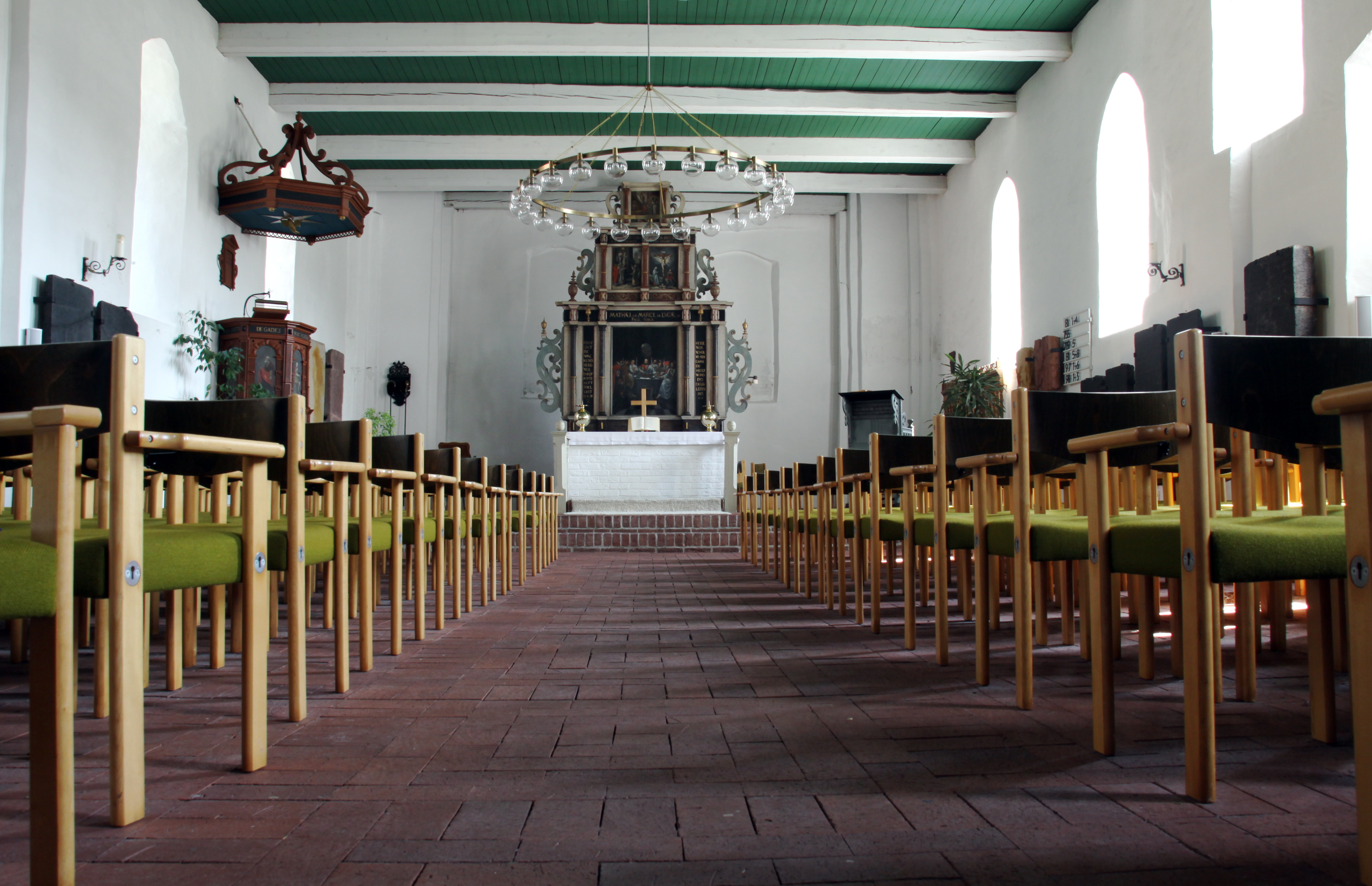
Interior of the church

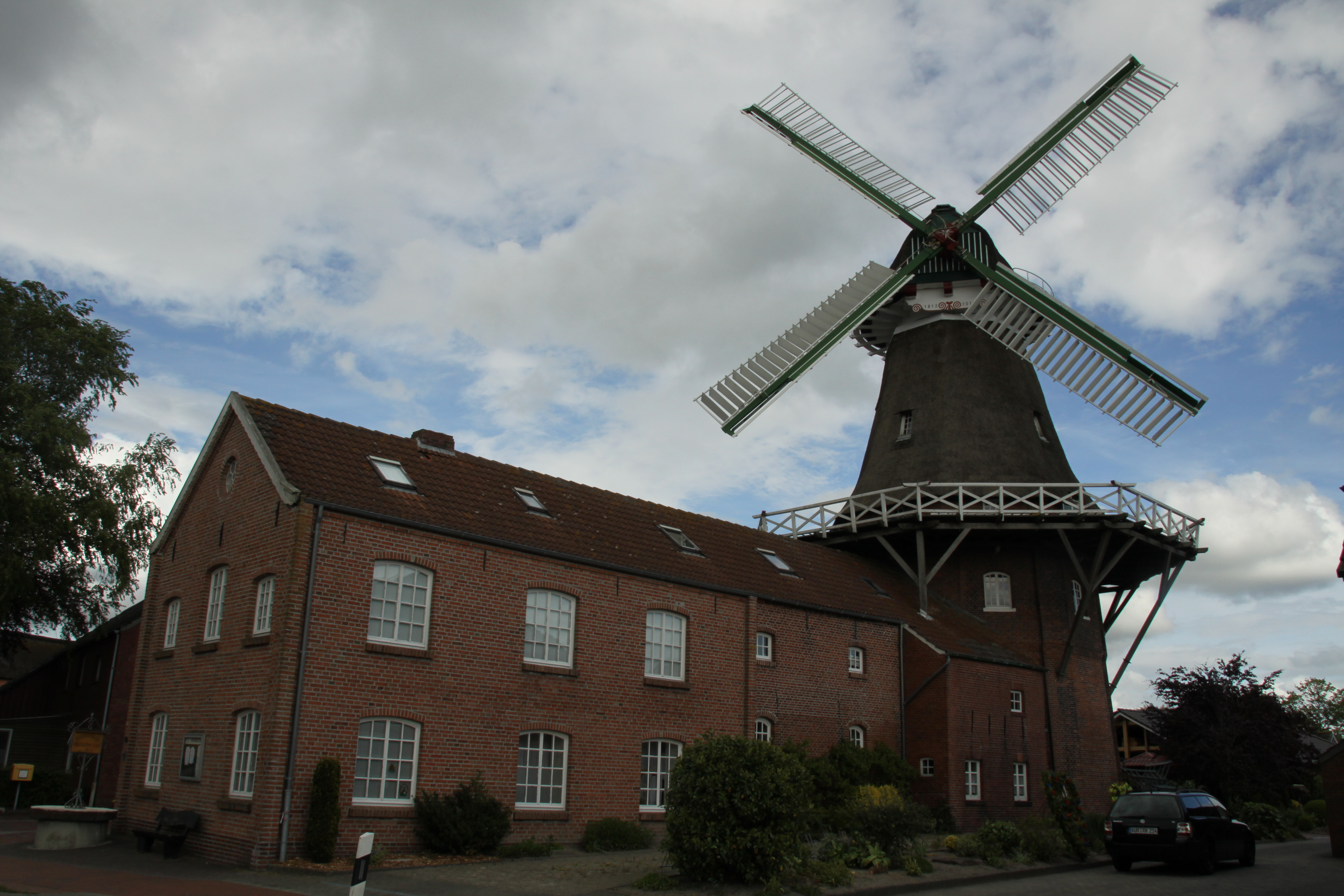
Windmill
