= Großefehn =

- Municipality
- Flag Coat of arms

- Location of Großefehn within Aurich district
- Interactive map of Großefehn
- Location within Germany Location within Lower Saxony
- Coordinates: 53°23′N 7°35′E
- Country: Germany
- State: Lower Saxony
- District: Aurich

Government
  - Mayor (2019–24): Erwin Adams (Ind.)

Area
  - Total: 127.25 km^{2} (49.13 sq mi)
- Elevation: 5 m (16 ft)

Population (2025-12-31)
  - Total: 13,955
  - Density: 109.67/km^{2} (284.03/sq mi)
- Time zone: UTC+01:00 (CET)
  - Summer (DST): UTC+02:00 (CEST)
- Postal codes: 26629
- Dialling codes: 04943-04946- 04945
- Vehicle registration: AUR
- Website: www.grossefehn.de

Großefehn (East Frisian Low Saxon: Groo'feen) is a municipality consisting of 14 villages in the district of Aurich, in Lower Saxony, Germany. It is situated approximately 10 km southeast of Aurich.
