= Moordorf, Lower Saxony =

Moordorf
- Village of Südbrookmerland
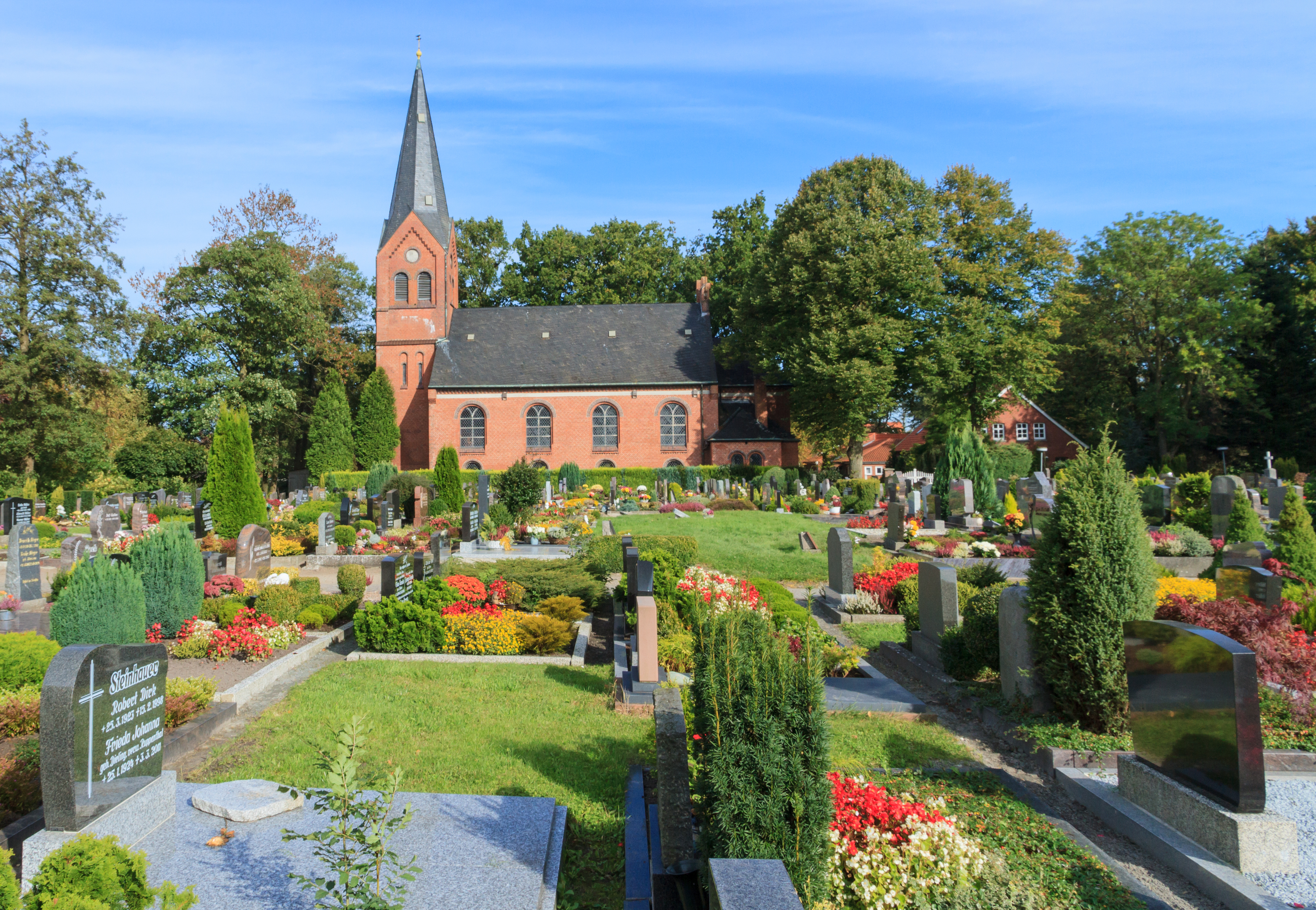
- Martin Luther Church

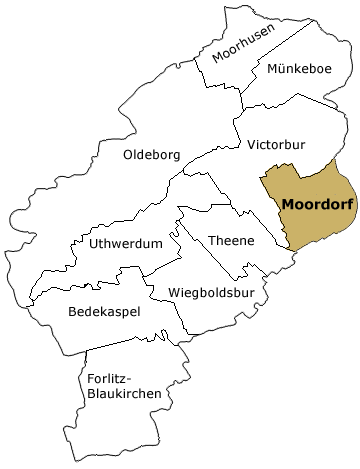
- Location of Moordorf in Südbrookmerland
- Interactive map of Moordorf
- Location within Germany Location within Lower Saxony
- Coordinates: 53.47720°N 7.39643°E
- Country: Germany
- State: Lower Saxony
- District: Aurich
- Municipality: Südbrookmerland

Area
  - Metro: 6.15 km^{2} (2.37 sq mi)
- Elevation: 3 m (9.8 ft)

Population
  - Metro: 6,366
- Time zone: UTC+01:00 (CET)
  - Summer (DST): UTC+02:00 (CEST)
- Dialling codes: 04941, 04942
- Vehicle registration: 26624

Moordorf is an East Frisian village in Lower Saxony, Germany. It is both the highest and most densely populated Ortsteil of the municipality of Südbrookmerland, in the district of Aurich. Originally, Moordorf was a linear village but developed into a dispersed settlement due to the designation of new building areas.

Moordorf was an independent municipality until it was incorporated into the municipality of Südbrookmerland on 1 July 1972.

Moordorf's most notable feature is Moormuseum Moordorf, a museum depicting what life was like in the small huts on the East Frisian moors.

== Etymology ==
Initially, the place was called Kolonie am Schwarzen Weg. From 1771 onwards, the name Mohrdorff, later Moordorf, prevailed. The origin of the name (which translates to English as "moor village") is sufficiently explained by its location in the moorland.

== Politics ==
After World War II, Moordorf was a stronghold of the SPD. In the first elections of 1949, the SPD received 30% of the votes. By 1990, the SPD received 70% of the vote. Currently, the mayor of Moordorf (Ortsvorsteher) is Stefan Kleinert (SPD).

== Notable people ==
- Herbert Schnoor, politician and lawyer (1927–2021)

== Gallery ==
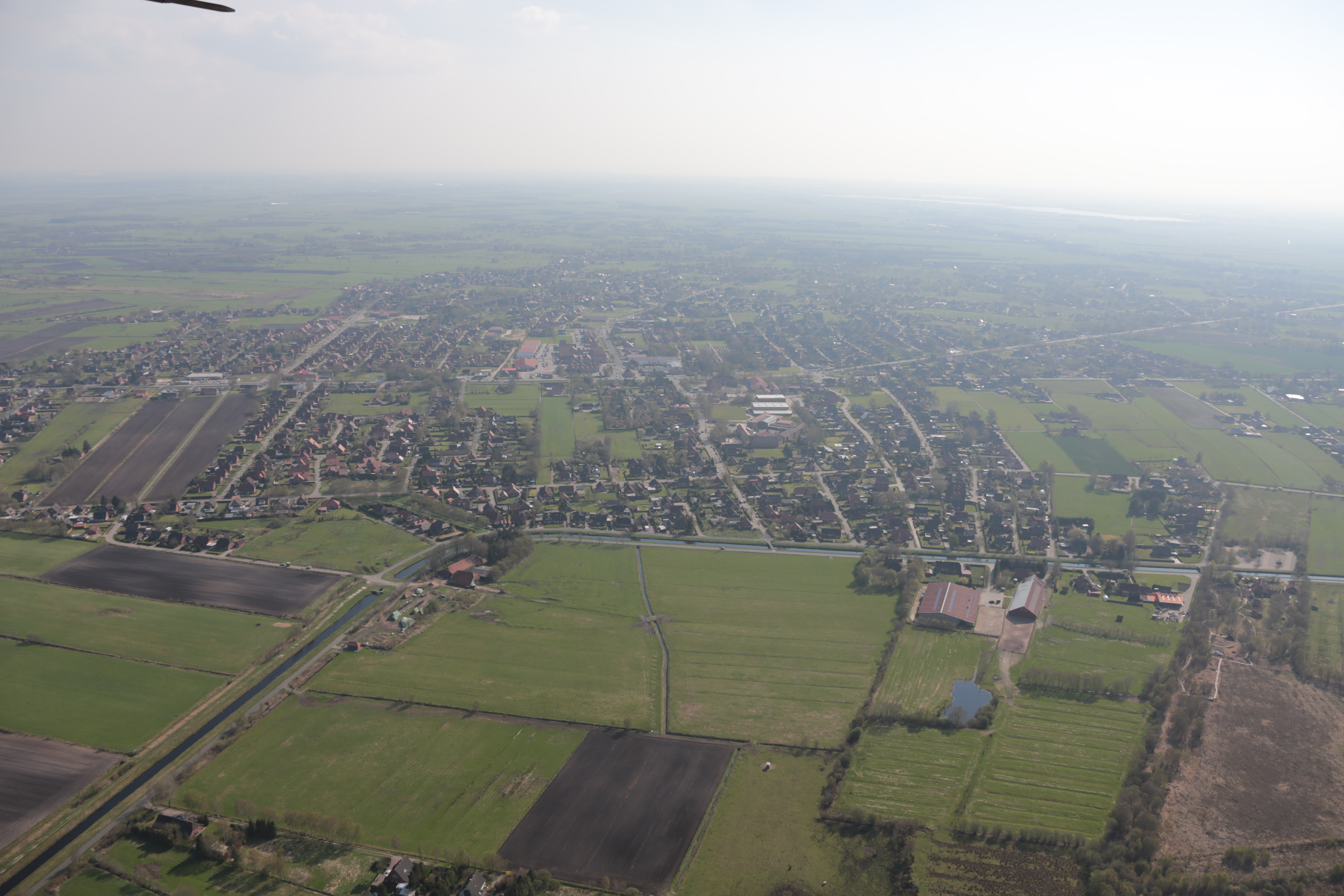
Aerial view of Moordorf

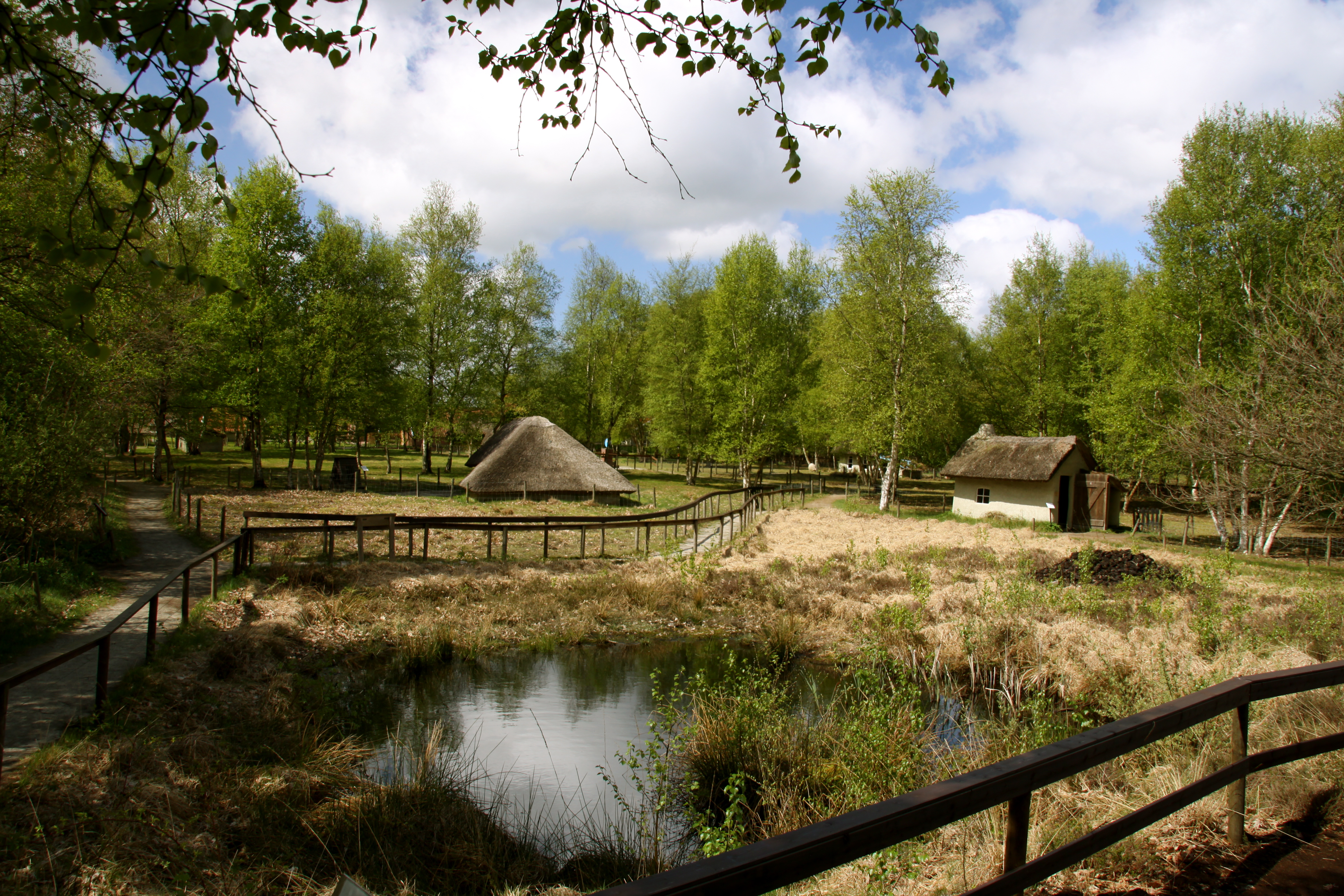
Moormuseum Moordorf

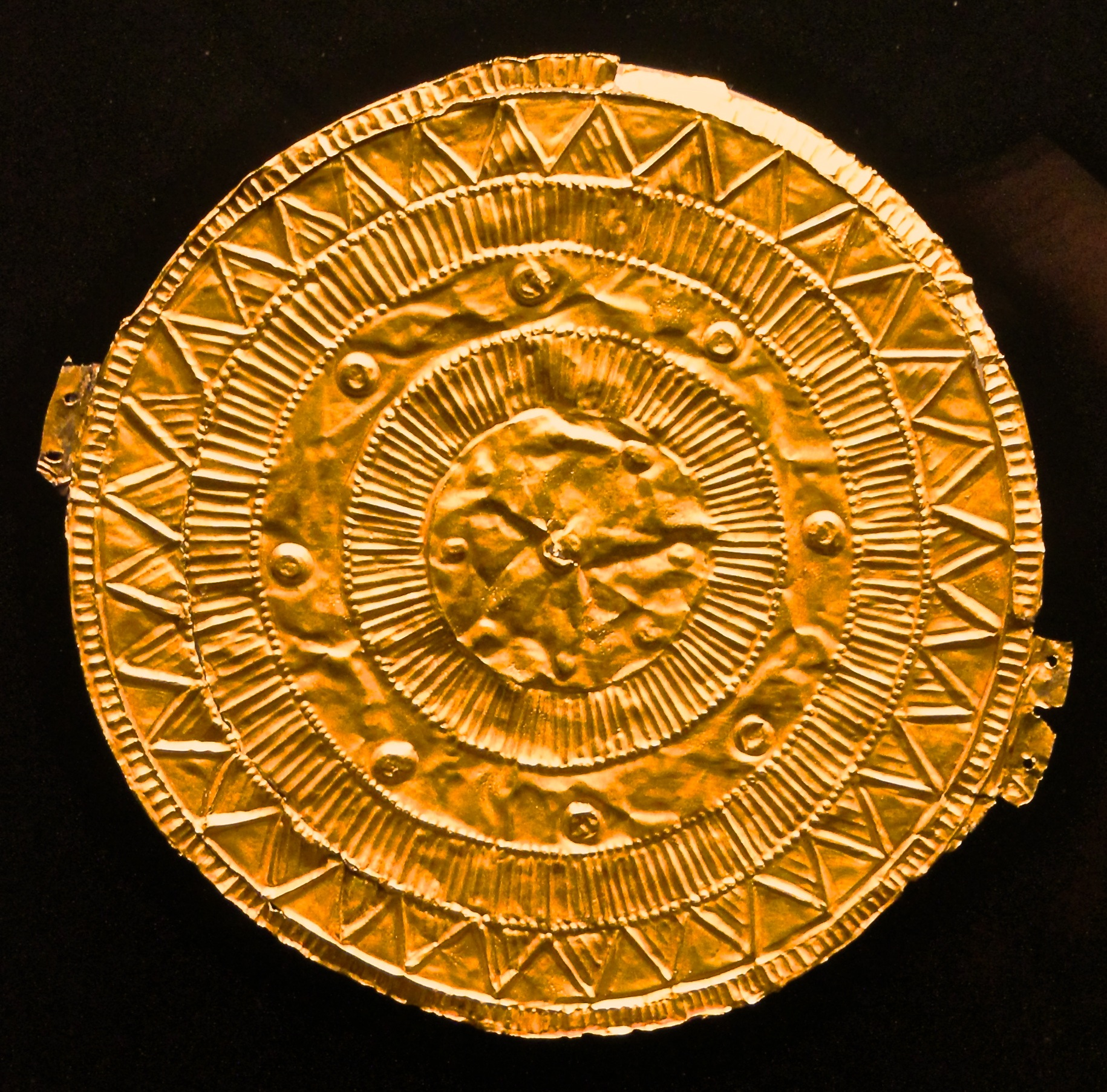
The golden disk of Moordorf
