= List of windmills in Lower Saxony =

A list of windmills in the German state of Lower Saxony.

== A ==
Location	Name of mill	Type	Built	Notes	Photograph
Abbenrode am Elm		Bockwindmühle	1880	Moved from Magdeburg. Worked until 1980. Restored 1994–95.	
Abbensen	Obermühle	Erdholländer		Worked until 1925. Derelict.	
Accum	Accumer Mühle	Galerieholländer	1746	Worked commercially until 1962. Restored 1995.	
Achim		Galerieholländer	1761	Replaced an earlier mill. Worked until 1965. Museum since 1969.	
Algermissen	Algermissener Mühle	Bockwindmühle	1766	Moved to Molfsee, Schleswig-Holsein in 1965.	
Almhorst	Almhorster Mühle	Turmholländer	1882	Worked by wind until 1930, then by engine until 1942. Machinery removed in mid1950s. House converted in 1987, new cap in 2000.	
Altfunnixsiel		Erdholländer		Converted to holiday cottage.	
Apen	Hengstforde Windmühle	Galerieholländer	1742	Worked until the Second World War, Demolished in 1952, leaving the base standing.	
Apen	Hengstforde Windmühle	Galerieholländer	1998	Part of a hotel and restaurant complex.	
Apen		Galerieholländer		Ruined base remains.	
Artlenburg			1833	Burnt down 1889.	
Artlenburg		Galerieholländer	1889	Incorporated parts from a mill at Laßbrönne. Worked until 1954. Restored 1972-84 and 1996–99. Twin fantails.	
Aschen	Fohrings Mühle	Galerieholländer	1878	Worked by wind until 1947, then by electric motor into 1950s. Standing, derelict.	
Aschwarden		Bockwindmühle	1800	Demolished 1850.	
Aschwarden		Galerieholländer	1850	struck by lightning and burnt down in 1896.	
Aschwarden		Galerieholländer	1896	Restored 1982 and 2004.	
Asel	Aseler Mühle	Paltrockwindmühle	1894	Built in 1850 at Schöppenstedt as a bockwindmühle. Converted to Paltrockmühle when moved to Asel. Worked by wind until 1950 then by diesel engine until 1969. Restored 1993.	
Aurich	Stiftsmühle	Galerieholländer	1858	Restored 1977 and 2000–02.	
Aurich	Vosberg Mühle	Bockwindmühle	1578	Blew down in October 1883.	
Aurich	Vosberg Mühle	Galerieholländer	1884	Working commercially by engine power.	
Aurich	Haxtum Mühle	Galerieholländer	1853	Struck by lightning and burnt down in 1885.	
Aurich	Haxtum Mühle	Galerieholländer	1886	Working commercially by engine power.	

== B ==
Location	Name of mill	Type	Built	Notes	Photograph
Bad Bentheim	Lukas Mühle	Turmholländer		Converted to art gallery housing works by Friedrich Hartmann.	
Bad Bentheim	Ostmühle	Bockwindmühle	1720	Collapsed in a storm in 1747.	
Bad Bentheim	Ostmühle	Erdholländer	1750	Worked by wind until 1939. Restored 1986. In working order.	
Bad Bentheim		Turmholländer		Converted to Youth Hostel	
Bad Bederkesa			C16th	Struck by lightning and burnt down in 1881.	
Bad Bederkesa		Holländerwindmühle	1881	Worked by wind until 1950. Restored in 1996.	
Bad Rothenfelde		Kokermühle	2008	Reconstruction of a pumping mill. Three of which operated in the area between 1822 and 1920.	
Bad Zwischenahn	Kurpark	Galerieholländer	1960	Moved from Hüllstede.	
Bad Zwischenahn	Rotte Mühle; Rügenwalder Mühle	Türmhollander			
Bad Zwischenahn	Roßtrup Mühle	Spinnkopfmühle		Restored.	
Bad Zwischenahn	Grimmsche Mühle	Galerieholländer	1851	Demolished in 1934. Site marked by brick representation of part of base walls.	
Bad Zwischenahn	Mill on site of Ekerner Mühle	Erdhollander	1865	Burnt down 1910.	
Bad Zwischenahn	Ekerner Mühle	Galerieholländer	1910	Worked by wind until 1945, then by suction gas engine until 1963. Restored 1997.	
Bad Zwischenahn	Mill on site of Elmendorf Mühle		1584		
Bad Zwischenahn	Elmendorf Mühle	Galerieholländer	1851	House converted base remains.	
Bad Zwischenahn	First mill on site of Querenstede Mühle		1802	Burnt down.	
Bad Zwischenahn	Second mill on site of Querenstede Mühle			Burnt down.	
Bad Zwischenahn	Third mill on site of Querenstede Mühle			Burnt down.	
Bad Zwischenahn	Querenstede Mühle	Galerieholländer		Restored 1997–2001.	
Bagband	Bagbander Müehle	Galerieholländer	1812		
Bardowick	Meyer's Mühle	Galerieholländer	1812	Worked by wind until 1952, then by engine until 1967. Restored in 1994.	
Barßel	Kirchenmühle	Bockhollander	1720	Burnt down 1852.	
Barßel	Ebkensche Mühle	Galerieholländer	1854	On site of Kirchenmühle. Worked commercially until 1965. Restored in 1995.	
Barver	Läer	Galerieholländer	1865	Oil and flour mill. Worked until 1930s. Under restoration.	
Bassum		Galerieholländer		Derelict.	
Bassum		Galerieholländer		House conversion.	
Bedekaspel	Fluttermühle Bedekaspel	Fluttermühle			
Bedeskapel	Agnes (de)	Erdhöllander	1986	Used for pumping water into the Wiegboldspolder.	
Bensen	Behlmer Mühle; Eitzen Mühle	Sockelgeschoßholländer	1872	Worked by wind until 1962, then by engine. Demolished in 2011.	
Benthe		Galerieholländer		House conversion	
Berdum	Mill on site of Berdumer Mühle	Erdholländer	1782	Demolished c.1820.	
Berdum	Berdumer Mühle; Krullsche Mühle	Erdholländer	1820	Worked commercially until 1972. Restored in 1993. Sails removed following storm damage in 2004.	
Berumerfehn	Berumerfehn Mühle	Hockmühle	1867	Raised in 1904. Demolished in 1937.	
Berumerfehn	Berumerfehn Mühle	Galerieholländer	1937	Worked until 1966. Restored in 1985–90.	
Bergen	Wardböhmen Mühle	Sockelgeschoßholländer			
Bilm		Holländerwindmühle		Base only, house converted	
Bissendorf		Bockwindmühle	1602	Moved to Kaltenweide in 1878.	
Blender		Galerieholländer			
Bockhorn		Holländerwindmühle	1639	Dismantled 1959 and moved to Meppen.	
Bokel		Galerieholländer		House converted base remains.	
Bokel		Galerieholländer	1764	Dismantled in 1938, re-erected at Museumsdorf Cloppenburg – Niedersächsisches Freilichtmuseum in 1941.	
Börger	Ostertmühle	Erdholländer	1836	Working until 1958. House conversion.	
Börger	Westertmühle	Galerieholländer	1884	Severely damaged in a storm on 25 October 1941. Subsequently, demolished. Base only remains, converted to residential use.	
Borstel		Sockelgeschoßholländer			
Braunschweig	Victoria Luise	Bockwindmühle	1836		
Brockel	Brockeler Mühle	Galerieholländer	1860	Worked by wind until 1920, then by diesel engine until 1946. Thereafter by electric motor.	
Brökel		Erdholländer		House converted smock remains.	
Bruchmühlen		Turmholländer			
Buchholz in der Nordheide	Dibbersen Mühle	Sockelgeschoßholländer	1871	Worked by wind until 1934. then by electric motor until 1953. Stripped of machinery and house converted in 1959. Restoration began in 1995.	
Bunde	Mill on site of Bunder Mühle		1869	Burnt down May 1911.	
Bunde	Bunder Mühle	Galerieholländer	1911	Worked by wind until early 1960s, then by electric motor until late 1960s. Restored 1974–78.	
Bunde	Charlottenpolder	Sockelgeschoßholländer		Base only, house conversion.	
Bunde	Mill on site of Königs Mühle		1530	Moved to the Netherlands, 1594.	
Bunde	Königs Mühle	Galerieholländer			
Bunde	Wynhamster Kolk Mühle	Erdholländer	1804	Combined drainage and corn mill. Working until the late 1950s. Restored 1989.	
Bunde		Holländerwindmühle		Base only.	
Burgdorf	Sorgenser Mühle	Bockwindmühle	1686		
Burgdorf	Marriser Mühle	Bockwindmühle	C17th	Moved from Sehnde.	
Burgwedel		Bockwindmühle			
Buttforde		Galerieholländer		House conversion.	
Buttforde		Holländerwindmühle		Drainage and flour mill, moved to Tannenhausen in 1923.	

== C ==
Location	Name of mill	Type	Built	Notes	Photograph
Campen		Galerieholländer		Base remains.	
Carolinensiel	Carolinensiel Mühle	Galerieholländer	1742	Converted to holiday cottage.	
Cloppenburg	Museumsdorf Cloppenburg – Niedersächsisches Freilichtmuseum; Kappenwindmüehle	Galerieholländer	1941	Moved from Bokel.	
Cloppenburg	Museumsdorf Cloppenburg – Niedersächsisches Freilichtmuseum; Kokermühle	Kokerwindmühle	1956	Moved from Edewecht.	
Cloppenburg	Museumsdorf Cloppenburg – Niedersächsisches Freilichtmuseum	Bockwindmühle	1967	Moved from Essern	

== D ==
Location	Name of mill	Type	Built	Notes	Photograph
Dangastermoor		Galerieholländer		House conversion.	
Dedesdorf	Mühle Ursel	Galerieholländer	1847	Restored in 1998.	
Depsted		Galerieholländer		Base only.	
Dickel		Galerieholländer		Formerly had six sails. Base remains.	
Diepholz		Turmholländer		Derelict.	
Dingelbe		Sockelgeschoßholländer		House conversion.	
Dinklage	Schwege, Bäuken's Möhlen	Galerieholländer	1848	Worked by wind until 1922, when milling was moved to a nearby engine driven mill. Restored in 1962. Returned to working order in 2004.	
Ditzum	Ditzumer Mühle		1769	Burnt down in 1882.	
Ditzum	Ditzumer Mühle	Galerieholländer	1883	Burnt down in April 1943. Base survived, in which milling continued by engine power. Surviving another fire in April 1945, it worked until 1986.	
Ditzum	Ditzumer Mühle	Galleriehollander	1992	Smock moved from Strübbel, Schleswig-Holstein and placed on base of original mill. Restored to working order in 1994.	
Ditzumerverlaat	Nanowa	Holländerwindmühle		Base remains, converted to holiday cottage.	
Dollbergen		Sockelgeschoßholländer		House conversion.	
Dornum		Bockwindmühle	1626	Working until 1960. Restored in 1962–66, 1973–75 and 2010.	
Dornum		Galerieholländer		House converted base remains.	
Drantum		Galerieholländer	c1850	Demolished 1979. Rebuilt at Barger-Compascuum, Drenthe, Netherlands in 1983.	
Drantum		Erdholländer	1860	Demolished 24 January 2017.	
Drentwede		Sockelgeschoßholländer		Base remains.	
Düdenbüttel	First mill on site of Amanda		1853	Struck by lightning and burnt down in 1874.	
Düdenbüttel	Second mill on site of Amanda		1874	Struck by lightning and burnt down on 30 April 1896.	
Düdenbüttel	Amanda	Galerieholländer	1896	Worked commercially until the early 1950s. Restored to working order in 1997. Named in 2001.	
Dudensen		Bockwindmühle	1827	Moved from Twistringen.	

== E ==
Location	Name of mill	Type	Built	Notes	Photograph
Ebergötzen	Europäisches Brotmuseum	Bockwindmühle	2004	Moved from Mollenfelde.	
Edewecht	Kokermühle	Kokermühle	1879	Moved to Museumsdorf Cloppenburg – Niedersächsisches Freilichtmuseum in 1956.	
Edewecht		Galerieholländer		Base remains, converted to silo.	
Edewecht	Oltmanns Mühle	Turmholländer	1888	Restored 1998–99.	
Edewecht	First mill on site of Westerscheps Mühle	Holländerwindmühle	1799	Burnt down in 1827.	
Edewecht	Second mill on site of Westerscheps Mühle	Holländerwindmühle	1827	Struck by lightning and burnt down in 1879.	
Edewecht	Westerscheps Mühle, Mühle Kruse-Deeken	Galerieholländer	1880	Restored.	
Elsdorf		Sockelgeschoßholländer		House conversion.	
Emden	Barckmühle auf der Schuhmacherwarf		c.1601	Built in the early 1600s, standing in 1649. It was a bark mill.	
Emden	Buyten den Nyen Porte	Bockwindmühle		Standing in 1558 and again in 1613.	
Emden	De Zäge Molen op de Bummert (on site of Concordia)	Paltrockmühle		Was standing in 1675. Later replaced by Concordia.	
Emden	Concordia	Gallerieholländer		Worked until December 1941. Subsequently, severely damaged during air raids on Emden. Dismantled March–June 1946.	
Emden	Eintracht		1871	Worked by wind until December 1932, when an engine was installed.	
Emden	Gelben Mühlenzwinger		1574	Stood on the site of the Olde Stadtmoele. Standing in 1799 but gone by 1820.	
Emden	De Goede Verwagtung	Gallerieholländer	1811	Replaced De Kleine Mühle. Burnt down 21 October 1887. The base survived.	
Emden	De Goede Verwagtung	Gallerieholländer	1888	Built on the surviving base of the previous mill. Worked by wind until 1912 then by steam engine. Destroyed in an air raid on 6 September 1944. Base survived, but was demolished in April 1955.	
Emden	De Grote Molen			Built between 1599 and 1615. Standing in 1799 but gone by 1806.	
Emden	De Groote Pelmolen		1698	Burnt down 1735.	
Emden	De Groote Pelmolen	Gallerieholländer	1735	Struck by lightning and burnt down 10 August 1868.	
Emden	Grützmühlen in der Kranstraß			Standing in 1651 and 1687. There were at least two mills, but they may have been horse mills or treadmills.	
Emden	Harmonie		1871	A drainage mill. Demolished in 1937.	
Emden	De Hoop	Holländermühle	1792	A saw mill, it burnt down on 7 August 1833.	
Emden	De Hoop	Holländermühle	1848	A saw mill, it burnt down on 15 July 1857.	
Emden	De Kleine Mühle	Bockwindmühle	1533	Burnt down 1 December 1810. Replaced by De Goede Verwagting.	
Emden	Windmühle beim Anwesen Hinrichs, Marienwehr, Kleines Meerhaus		1932	A small grain mill, moved here from an unrecorded location where it had been a drainage mill. Demolished in 1940.	
Emden	Ligt en Spys	Holländerwindmühle	1751	An oil mill. Demolished i 1896.	
Emden	De Moele by Tyen Thorn; Grote Molen	Bockwindmühle		Standing between 1559 and 1601.	
Emden	Mühle in dem Breiten Gang			This mill was sold in 1563.	
Emden	Mühle vor der Burgh	Bockwindmühle		Mentioned in a document of 1431 as standing "vor der Burgh". Site possibly that later occupied by the Larrelter Mühle or De Goede Verwachting.	
Emden	Mühle beim Herrentor		Late C16th	Built between 1595 and 1599. Was a pearl barley mill. Burnt down in 1808.	
Emden	Die Windmühlen in der Herrlichkeit Pektum	Bockwindmühle		Standing in 1662 and 1792.	
Emden	Die Holländermühle am Heerweg	Gallerieholländer	1796	Demolished in 1955.	
Emden	Naarstigheid	Paltrockmühle		First mentioned in 1964, this saw mill was blown down on 1 June 1913.	
Emden	Die Mühle außerhalb der Norder Pforte	Bockwindmühle		Standing in 1599 Not mentionee after 1628. Was a leather mill.	
Emden	Olde Stadtmoele up dem Bonnes			Standing in 1571.	
Emden	Olmühle up der Neyestadt			An oil mill, it was standing in 1564 and 1567.	
Emden	Die Pulvermühle auf Faldern			A gunpowder mill, Standing in 1573, not mentioned after 1582.	
Emden	Remmers			A drainage mill, working until late 1930s.	
Emden	Roede Molen; Roten Mühlenzwinger	Bockwindmühle	1573	Demolished c.1810.	
Emden	Rote Mühle	Galerieholländer	1810	Burnt down 20 November 1822.	
Emden	Rote Mühle	Galerieholländer	1823	Burnt down 1 November 1913. Base survived and was temporarily used as an engine driven mill.	
Emden	Rote Mühle	Galerieholländer	1914	Burnt down 16 August 1916. The base survived and was roofed over. The mill was not immediately rebuilt due to a shortage of materials cause by the First World War.	
Emden	Rote Mühle	Galerieholländer	1925	Demolished in 1946. The base survives in use as a kindergarten.	
Emden	Rote Scheune			A drainage nill.	
Emden	Sägemühle am Bollwerk			A saw mill, it was standing in 1665.	
Emden	Sägermühle im Petkumer Hammrich	Bockwindmühle	1846	A water pumping mill, was also used as a saw mill in the 1850s and 1860s. Sails blown off on 1 April 1931, mill demolished that autumn.	
Emden	Sedan		1871	A drainage mill, sold for demolition in January 1935.	
Emden	Die Senf- und Schocoladen Mühle am Beckhofstore	Gallerieholländer	1800s	Described as "recently built" in 1808. Standing in 1825 but demolished by 1852.	
Emden	Die Tholenschen Ölmühlen am Trekweg.			Built between 1670 and 1717. Standing in 1807.	
Emden		Holländerwindmühle	1814	Moved from the Netherlands. Burnt down 23 April 1875.	
Emden	Uphuser Mühle	Bockwindmühle		Standing by 1595, not mentioned after 1703.	
Emden	Vrouw Johanna	Galerieholländer	1805	Worked until 1956. Restored in 1982 and 1997–2000.	
Emden	Vullmolen buten Boltentor		Late C16th	Standing in 1593, not mentioned after 1663.	
Emden	De Weite Mühlen; Weizenmühlenzwinger; Schwarze Mühle	Bockwindmühle	1574	Destroyed in a storm in 1703.	
Emden	De Weite Mühlen; Weizenmühlenzwinger; Schwarze Mühle	Bockwindmühle	1711	Demolished 1810.	
Emden	Weizenmühle	Galerieholländer	1811	Worked by wind until damaged during the Second World War. Base only remains.	
Emden	Wurps			A drainage mill on the Stinkende Riede. Demolished February 1948.	
Emden	Zeldenrust	Paltrockmühle		A saw mill built between 1670 and 1717. Demolished in 1867.	
Emden	Zeldenrüst	Galerieholländer	1867	A corn mill, worked by wind until 1942, then by engine until 1962. Smock demolished in 1975. Base survives as a house conversion.	
Emden	Die Windmühle des Zimmermeisters	Gallerieholländer	c.1907	A small saw mill, the building it stood on was converted to a house in 1935. Last remains of the windmill were cleared in 1954.	
Emden	Zwernmeulen in der Osterstraße			Standing in 1650.	
Emden				Standing in 1449. Mentioned in a dowry of 1553.	
Emden				A drainage mill, working until late 1930s.	
Emden			1871	A drainage mill on the Niederemsischen Dyk. Demolished post World War II, brick base survived into 1950s.	
Emden				A drainage mill on the Uphuser Meer. Demolished in 1930.	
Emden				A drainage mill, stood to the north of the Fehntjer Tief.	
Emden			1920	A drainage mill. Demolished in 1935.	
Emsbühren		Bockwindmühle		Demolished 1802.	
Emsbühren	Enkings Mühle	Galerieholländer	1802	Worked by wind until late 1920s, then by electric motor. Restored 2002.	
Emtinghausen		Bockwindmühle	1561	Blown down 1631.	
Emtinghausen		Bockwindmühle	1650	Struck by lightning and burnt down on 26 July 1679.	
Emtinghausen		Bockwindmühle	1679	Demolished c1813.	
Emtinghausen		Galerieholländer	1816	Demolished 1873.	
Emtinghausen		Galerieholländer	1873	Under restoration to working order.	
Engeln	Behlmer Mühle	Galerieholländer	1876	Worked until 1968, restored 1988–91.	
Eschede		Türmhollander	1874	Worked by wind until 1925, then by diesel engine. Restored in 1980s.	
Esens	Mill on site of Peldemühle		1701	A pearl barley mill. Permission granted in 1722 for a replacement. Demolished c.1850.	
Esens	Peldemühle	Galerieholländer	1850	Cap and sails removed in 1945, worked by engine until 1960s. Restored 1986–89.	
Essen	Diekmanns Mühle	Galerieholländer	1650	Restored 1979-90	
Essern		Bockwindmühle	1638	Dismantled 1966, moved to Museumsdorf Cloppenburg – Niedersächsisches Freilichtmuseum.	
Etelsen	Jan Wind	Galerieholländer	1871	Worked by wind until 1928, then by diesel engine. Restored 1993–99.	
Evern			C14th		
Eydelstedt		Galerieholländer		Base remains.	
Eyendorf		Sockelgeschoßholländer	1897	Restored 1952-53 and worked commercially until 1988. Further restoration in 1972-78 and 2000.	
Eystrup		Erdholländer		Standing by 1840, struck by lightning and burnt down in 1861.	
Eystrup	Margarethe	Galerieholländer	1861	Worked commercially until 1960s. Restored in 1982–83, 1993 and 1997.	

== F ==
Location	Name of mill	Type	Built	Notes	Photograph
Fallersleben		Bockwindmühle		Standing c.1650	
Felde	Felde Mühle	Galerieholländer	1866	Worked until 1966, restored 1996.	
Firrel		Galerieholländer		Base only, house conversion.	
Frankenfeld	Frankenfelder Mühle	Bockwindmühle	1594	Dismantled 1953, moved to Rethem.	
Friedeburg	Horster Mühle	Galerieholländer	1838	Working commercially	
Fulkum	Johannimühle	Holländerwindmühle	1865	Working until 1954, latterly by electric motor. Burnt down 21 August 2000. Base survives, rebuild planned.	

== G ==
Location	Name of mill	Type	Built	Notes	Photograph
Garlstorf	Annananna; Garlstorfer Mühle	Galerieholländer	1865	Working until 1964 or later. House conversion.	
Gehlenberg	Gehlen Mühle	Erdholländer	1810	Demolished in 1840.	
Gehlenberg	Gehlen Mühle	Erdholländer	1840	Working until 1950. Restored 1967 and 2002.	
Gehrden	Köthnerberg Mühle	Bockwindmühle	1789	Standing in 1805.	
Gehrden	Struckmeyers Mühle	Turmholländer	1878	Worked until early C20th. Was used as a youth centre prior to the Second World War. Used as a store post-war. Conserved in 1994.	
Georgsdorf	Georgsdorfer Mühle	Galerieholländer	1875	Working until 1963. Restored to working order in the 1980s.	
Gifhorn	International Wind- and Watermill Museum. Greek windmill	Turmholländer			
Gifhorn	International Wind- and Watermill Museum. Portuguese windmill	Turmholländer			
Gifhorn	International Wind- and Watermill Museum. Spanish windmill	Turmholländer			
Gifhorn	International Wind- and Watermill Museum. French windmill	Turmholländer			
Gifhorn	International Wind- and Watermill Museum. Dutch windmill	Sockelgeschoßholländer			
Gifhorn	International Wind- and Watermill Museum.	Bockwindmühle			
Gifhorn	International Wind- and Watermill Museum. Sansoucci Mühle	Galerieholländer			
Gifhorn	International Wind- and Watermill Museum. Ukrainian windmill	Galerieholländer			
Gifhorn	International Wind- and Watermill Museum. Russian windmill	Bockwindmühle			
Gifhorn	International Wind- and Watermill Museum. Lady Devorgilla	Turmholländer			
Gilten	Bothmer Mühle	Galerieholländer			
Glandorf	Glandorfer Mühle	Turmholländer	1840	Worked by wind until 1930s, then by diesel engine until 1960s. Restored 1985–86.	
Gödestorf		Sockelgeschoßholländer		House conversion.	
Greetsiel	Rote Mühle; West Mühle	Galerieholländer	1856	Worked by wind until 1972. Converted to tea room in 1976. (Mill on right in photo)	
Greetsiel	Schoof' Mühle; Oost Mühle	Galerieholländer	1921	Working until 1975, restored 1997. Tailwinded on 28 October 2013, cap and sails blown off. Under restoration. (Mill on left in photo)	
Groothusen		Bckwindmühle		Blown down 1894.	
Groothusen	Folkerts Mühle	Sockelgeschoßholländer	1896	Smock came from De Eendragt, Emden. Working until 16 October 1967 when cap and sails were blown off. The smock survives.	
Großefehn	Mühle Bagband	Galerieholländer	1812	Worked commercially until 1982.	
Großenheidorn		Holländerwindmhle		Burnt down in 1946.	
Großenkneten	Hengstlage Mühle	Sockelgeschoßholländer	1876	Destroyed on 28 April 1945.	
Großenkneten	Emma, Hengstlage Mühle	Sockelgeschoßholländer	1947	Working commercially until 1987.	
Großheide		Galerieholländer	1896	Base survives.	
Groß Sisbeck		Turmholländer			
Groß Twülpstedt		Turmholländer			
Gut Dunau		Galerieholländer		House conversion.	

== H ==
Location	Name of mill	Type	Built	Notes	Photograph
Habbrügge	De Lütje Anja	Galerieholländer	1989	Moved from Sulingen.	
Hage	Hagermühle	Galerieholländer	1871	Working until 1965.	
Halchter		Turmholländer	1880	Working until 1956. Restored 1992.	
Handorf		Galerieholländer	1869	Working until 1970. Converted to house in 1980.	
Hänigsen		Bockwindmühle	1704	Working until 1945. Restored 1962.	
Hannover	Aegidentors Mühle	Bockwindmühle	1701	Moved to Hermann-Lons Park in 1936.	
	Alte Mühle, Hermann-Lons Park	Bockwindmühle	1936	Restored 2008–12.	
Haren		Bockwindmühle		Demolished c.1825.	
Haren		Sockelgeschoßholländer	1825	Restored 1980.	
Harenburg	Harenburger Mühle		1684	Demolished 1860.	
Harenburg	Harenburger Mühle	Sockelgeschoßholländer	1860		
Harkenbleck		Turmholländer		Truncated, house conversion.	
Hechthausen	Mill on site of Caroline			Demolished 1840.	
Hechthausen	Caroline	Galerieholländer	1845	Working until 1960s.	
Hedeper	Kickelberg Mühle	Erdholländer	1900	Working until 1956, restored 1976–78.	
Heerstedt	Mühle Bischoff, Alte Mühle	Galerieholländer	1867	Working until the 1970s. House conversion and cafe.	
Heidmühle		Galerieholländer		Restored.	
Helmstedt	Barthausen		1848	A drainage mill, demolished in 1930.	
Hemmoor		Galerieholländer			
Heppens	Mill on site of Kopperhörner Mühle	Bockwindmühle	1547	Blown down 1698.	
Heppens	Mill on site of Kopperhörner Mühle	Bockwindmühle	1698	Demolished 1839.	
Heppens	Kopperhörner Mühle	Galerieholländer	1839	Worked by wind until 1908, then by engine until 1960s. Restored 1980.	
Herzlake	Aselage Mühle	Sockelgeschoßholländer	1860	Working until storm damaged in November 1941. Restored 1979.	
Hinte	Hintermühle			Standing in 1658.	
Hinte	Hintermühle	Galerieholländer	1869	Worked by wind until 1958 when smock demolished. Milling continued until 1987 in the base using an engine.	
Hinte	Hintermühle	Galerieholländer	1993		
Hittfeld		Sockelgeschoßholländer		Restored.	
Hohenhameln		Bockwindmühle			
Hollen	Heiser Mühle	Galerieholländer	1877	Worked until 1960s, restored 1974.	
Hollern-Twielenfleth	Venti Amica	Galerieholländer	C18th		
Hollwege		Galerieholländer		House converted.	
Holtland		Bockwindmühle		Standing in 1701. Demolished c.1863.	
Holtland		Galerieholländer	1863	Worked until 1974, latterly by engine. Restored 1995–99.	
Horst		Turmholländer		Converted to restaurant.	
Hotteln		Bockwindmühle	1812	Moved to Europäisches Brotmuseum, Mollenfelde in 1974.	
Hoyerhagen		Galerieholländer	1866	Restored 1979.	
Huckelrieden	Schutenmühle	Sockelgeschoßholländer	c.1760	Worked until c.1954. Restored in 1993–95.	
Huckstedt	Margarethe	Galerieholländer	1878		
Hüllstede		Holländerwindmühle		Moved to Bad Zwischenahn in 1958.	
Hüven	Hüvener Mühle	Galerieholländer	1851	Combined wind and water mill. The watermill dates from 1534. The mills worked until 1950.	

== I ==
Location	Name of mill	Type	Built	Notes	Photograph
Idafehn	Idafehntjer Mühle	Galerieholländer	1891	Restored 1999–2000.	
Ihlowerfehn	Berta, De Bergsche Mühle	Galerieholländer	1870	Worked until 1962, restored 1983–88.	
Ilten		Turmholländer		House conversion.	
Isernhagen		Bockwindmühle		Demolished 1958	
Isernhagen		Sockelgeschoßholländer		House conversion	

== J ==
Location	Name of mill	Type	Built	Notes	Photograph
Jeddeloh		Spinnkopfmühle		Restored.	
Jemgum	Alte Mühle	Galerieholländer		Base only, house conversion.	
Jemgum	Jemgumer Mühle	Galerieholländer	1740	Raised in 1756. Worked by wind until 1957. Restored 1974–79.	
Jennelt		Galerieholländer		Base only, house conversion.	
Jever	Schlachtmühle	Galerieholländer	1846	Restored to working order in 2010.	
Jork	Aurora. Borsteler Mühle	Galerieholländer	1846	Worked until 1951. Restored 1985. Base houses a restaurant.	

== K ==
Location	Name of mill	Type	Built	Notes	Photograph
Kaltenweide		Bockwindmühle	1878	Moved from Bissendorf. Working until 1963, restored in 1983.	
Kästorf	Kästorfer Mühle	Bockwindmühle	1861	Working until 1969.	
Kätingen	Kätinger Mühle	Galerieholländer	1864	Working until 1963. House converted.	
Köhlen		Galerieholländer		Base only.	
Krummhörn	Schoonorther Mühle	Galerieholländer	1804	Base only, house conversion.	

== L ==
Location	Name of mill	Type	Built	Notes	Photograph
Laar		Galerieholländer	1807	Working until 1916. Restored to working order in 1981.	
Landesbergen		Galerieholländer			
Larrelt			1870	A drainage mill. Demolished in 1938.	
Larrelt	Ohling		1870	A drainage mill.	
Langlingen		Sockelgeschoßholländer	1856	Worked by wind until 1930s, then by engine until 1986.	
Larrelt	De Larrelter Mühle	Bockwindmühle	1632	Not mentioned after 1725.	
Larrelt	Kost-Winning-Mühle	Sockelgeschoßholländer	1732	Worked by wind until 1948.	
Lathen	Dürkensche Mühle	Bockwindmühle		Standing in 1650s. Demolished c.1783	
Lathen	Dürkensche Mühle	Holländerwindmühle	1783	Demolished 1818.	
Lathen	Dürkensche Mühle; Hilter Mühle	Sockelgeschoßholländer	1818	Restored 1964.	
Lavelsloh	Lavelsloher Mühle	Galerieholländer	1871	Working until 1958. House conversion.	
Leezdorf	Mill on site of Bartlingsche Mühle	Kokermühle		Collapsed 1895.	
Leezdorf	Bartlingsche Mühle, Leezdorfer Mühle	Galerieholländer	1896	Working by wind until 1970, then by engine until 1985. Restored 1996.	
Liener	Hermelings Mühle	Sockelgeschoßholländer	1872	Working by wind until 1961, then by engine. Restored 1994–96.	
Lintig	Lintiger Mühle	Galerieholländer	1872	Restored 1984.	
Logabirum		Galerieholländer	1895	Corn mill and saw mill. Working until 1975. Restored 1995–98.	
Lohnde	Lohnder Mühle		1872	Demolished 1934. Parts used to repair a windmill at Mardorf.	
Loppersum		Galerieholländer		Base only, house conversion.	
Lorup	Reha Mühle	Turmholländer		House conversion.	
Loxstedt	Ursel	Galerieholländer			
Lübberstedt	Lübberstedter Mühle	Sockelgeschoßholländer			
Lüdingworth	Betty	Turmholländer	1903	Restored 1993–96.	
Lütjegaste	Fluttermühle	Fluttermühle	2000		

== M ==
Location	Name of mill	Type	Built	Notes	Photograph
Machtsum		Bockwindmühle	1638	Working until 1956, restored 1984.	
Marienhafe	Friesenborgsche Mühle	Galerieholländer	1776	Conserved.	
Marienhafe	Tjücher Mühle	Galerieholländer	1896	Restored 1986.	
Martfeld	Mill on site of Feldmühle	Bockwindmühle		Standing in 1583. Demolished 1840.	
Martfeld	Mill on site of Feldmühle	Galerieholländer	1840	Struck by lightning and burnt down in 1851.	
Martfeld	Feldmühle	Galerieholländer	1851	Working until the Second World War. Restored 1992–97.	
Martfeld	Fehsenfeldsche Mühle	Galerieholländer	1871	Working until 1971, restored 1991.	
Martfeld	Stühr Mühle	Galerieholländer	1878	Working until 1939. largely stripped of machinery, derelict.	
Meine		Sockelgeschoßholländer		House conversion.	
Mellendorf		Erdholländer	1853		
Meppen	Hoeltingmühle	Sockelgeschoßholländer	1960	Moved from Bockhorn. Base houses a cafe.	
Midlum, Lower Saxony	Midlumer Mühle	Galerieholländer	1857	Working by wind until 1955, then by electric motor until 1992. Restored 1998.	
Mollenfelde	Europäisches Brotmuseum	Bockwindmühle	1974	Moved from Hotteln. Moved to Ebergötzen in 2004.	
Moorhusen		Galerieholländer		Base only.	
Mulsum	Anna Maria	Galerieholländer	1843		
Münkeboe	Fluttermühle Moorsee	Fluttermühle			
Münkeboe	Dorfmuseum Münkeboe	Galerieholländer	1854	Working by wind until 1962, then by electric motor until 1977. Restored 1981–85.	

== N ==
Location	Name of mill	Type	Built	Notes	Photograph
Nenndorf	Nenndorfer Mühle	Galerieholländer	1850	Struck by lightning and burnt down on 14 July 1872.	
Nenndorf	Nenndorfer Mühle	Galerieholländer	1872	Working until 1972. Restored late 1970s.	
Nesse	Nessumer Mühle	Galerieholländer	1856	Converted to restaurant.	
Neßmersiel		Galerieholländer	1884	Working until 1959. Stripped of machinery and converted to a grain silo in 1968.	
Neuenhaus	Veldhausen Mühle	Bockwindmühle		Struck by lightning and severely damaged in 1789.	
Neuenhaus	Veldhausen Mühle	Turmholländer	1790	Working until 1929. restored to working order in 1987.	
Neuenkirchen	Sprengeler Mühle	Galerieholländer			
Neuenkirchen-Vörden	Selings Mühle	Galerieholländer			
Neuharlingersiel	Seriemer Mühle	Galerieholländer	1804	Working until 1975, latterly by electric motor.	
Neuhaus		Galerieholländer		Base only.	
Neustadtgödens	Wedelfelder Wasserschöpfmühle	Erdholländer	1844	A drainage mill. Restored 1980.	
Neustadtgödens	Oberahm	Galerieholländer	1764	Working until 1966. Restored 1980.	
Neustadt am Rübenberge		Bockwindmühle			
Neustadt am Rübenberge		Galerieholländer			
Neustadt am Rübenberge		Turmholländer			
Niendorf		Sockelgeschoßholländer		Incorporated into engine driven mill.	
Nöpke		Galerieholländer		Converted to holiday cottage.	
Norden	Westgaster Mühle	Galerieholländer	1863		
Norden	Frisia-Mühle	Galerieholländer		In the mill an exhibition shows old machines and tools of the bakery handcraft	
Norden	Olmühle	Galerieholländer		House conversion.	
Norden	Wite Mühle	Galerieholländer	1891	House conversion.	
Nordenham-Moorsee		Fluttermühle			
Nordenham-Moorsee		Galerieholländer	1840	Burnt down 1904.	
Nordenham-Moorsee		Galerieholländer	1904	Working until 1977, restored 2005–06. Twin fantails.	
Norderney	Inselwindmühle Seldenrüst	Galerieholländer	1862	Converted to restaurant.	
Nordholz	Nordholzer Mühle	Galerieholländer	1863	Working until 1967. House converted.	

== O ==
Location	Name of mill	Type	Built	Notes	Photograph
Ochtersum		Turmholländer		House conversion.	
Ohrdorf		Turmholländer		Working until 1958. House converted.	
Oldenburg	Oldenburger Mühle	Galerieholländer		Converted to hotel and restaurant.	
Oldenburg		Holländerwindmühle		Moved to Seefeld in 1876.	
Osterholz-Scharmbeck	Osterholzer Mühle	Sockelgeschoßholländer	1769	Working until 1934. Converted to restaurant.	
Osterholz-Scharmbeck	Sandhauser Mühle	Sockelgeschoßholländer	1795	Working by wind until 1920, then by engine until 1941. Restored 1976.	
Osterholz-Scharmbeck	Mühle von Rönn, Scharmbecker Mühle	Galerieholländer	1883	Built as a five-sailer. Converted to four sails in 1911. Worked by wind until 1939 then by electric motor. Restored 2002.	
Ostgroßfehn		Galerieholländer			
Osterbruch		Galerieholländer			
Ost Victorbur		Galerieholländer		House conversion.	

== P ==
Location	Name of mill	Type	Built	Notes	Photograph
Padingbüttel		Sockelgeschoßholländer		Derelict.	
Papenburg	Meyers Müehle	Galerieholländer	1888	Restored.	
Papenburg		Bockwindmühle	1709	Preserved.	
Peine	Töpfers Mühle	Galerieholländer			
Pewsum	Pewsumer Mühle	Galerieholländer	1843	Preserved.	
Pewsum		Galerieholländer		Base only.	

== Q ==
Location	Name of mill	Type	Built	Notes	Photograph
Gusborn-Quickborn	Quickborner Mühle	Bockwindmühle	C15th	Destroyed during the Thirty Years' War.	
Gusborn-Quickborn	Quickborner Mühle	Paltrockmühle	1663	Working until 1960s. Restored 1980s.	

== R ==
Location	Name of mill	Type	Built	Notes	Photograph
Ramsloh		Galerieholländer		Restored.	
Rastede	Heubült Mühle	Galerieholländer	1864	Struck by lightning and burnt down in 1905.	
Rastede	Heubült Mühle	Galerieholländer	1905	Worked by wind until 1934. Derelict.	
Rastede	Lehmden Mühle	Galerieholländer		Base survives.	
Rehden		Holländerwindmühle		Demolished around 2016.	
Rethem	Frankenfelder Mühle	Bockwindmühle	1955	Moved from Frankenfeld.	
Rhauderfehn		Galerieholländer		Base only.	
Rhauderfehn	Hahnentanger Mühle	Sockelgeschoßholländer	1864	Working until 1938. Restored 1994.	
Riemsloh	Westhoyeler Mühle	Turmholländer	1870	Worked by wind until c.1920, then by engine until 1975.	
Riemsloh			1859	Stood on the Eickrott.	
Riepe	Fluttermühle Riepe	Fluttermühle	1986	Modern recreation of historic mill type.	
Riepe		Galerieholländer		Base survives as part of engine driven mill.	
Riepe		Spinnkopfmühle		Mill on site since at least 1694. Working until 1950s. Restored in 1984.	
Riepe	De Kaat	Galerieholländer	1935	Moved from "Edo". Restored 1990.	
Rodenberg		Turmholländer	1850	Working until 1916. Restored 2007.	
Ruttel	Rutteler Mühle	Galerieholländer	1865		
Rysum		Galerieholländer	1895	Burnt down 1917.	
Rysum		Galerieholländer	1921	Demolished 1964, smock to Bad Zwischenahn, base left standing.	
Rysum		Galerieholländer	1989	Smock moved here from a mill in Schleswig-Holstein.	

== S ==
Location	Name of mill	Type	Built	Notes	Photograph
Sachsenhagen				Standing in 1560.	
Salzgitter	Osterlinder Mühle	Bockwindmühle		Standing in 1770. Working until 1972. Restored in 1984.	
Salzgitter	Lesserlinder Mühle	Bockwindmühle		Standing in 1770.	
Salzgitter		Bockwindmühle	1858	Moved to Stederdorf in 1884.	
Sande	Sander Mühle	Turmholländer		House conversion.	
Sandhorst		Galerieholländer	1908	Worked by wind until 1970 then by engine until 1985. Restored 1988–91.	
Scharrel	Hanekamps Mühle	Galerieholländer	1871	Restored 1980s.	
Schiffdorf	Schiffdorfer Mühle	Galerieholländer	1864	Working until 1976. Restored.	
Schiffdorf		Galerieholländer		Base only, house conversion.	
Schneverdingen	Heber Mühle	Sockelgeschoßholländer			
Scholen		Galerieholländer		Preserved.	
Schwarme		Galerieholländer		Preserved.	
Schweindorf	Klaashensche Mühle	Galerieholländer	1907	Working until 1973, latterly as an engine driven mill. Wind driven machinery stripped out in 1965. Restored 1990s.	
Schweindorf	Galerieholländer	1874	Burnt down 20 August 1906.		
Schweinekopf		Galerieholländer			
Seelze		Sockelgeschoßholländer			
Seefeld	Seefelder Mühle	Galerieholländer	1876	Moved from Oldenberg. Working until 1968. Restored 1978–86.	
Sehnde		Bockwindmühle		Moved to Burgdorf in the C17th.	
Selsingen		Galerieholländer	1868	Stood to the north of the village. Moved in 1873.	
Selsingen	Elisabeth	Galerieholländer	1873	Burnt down 1971.	
Selsingen	Elisabeth	Galerieholländer	1983		
Sengwarden	Sengwarder Mühle	Galerieholländer	1863		
Simonswolde	Mühle am Sandwater	Galerieholländer	1813	Working by wind until 1947, then by engine until 1960. House converted 1996–97.	
Söhlde		Turmholländer	1880	Restored 1988.	
Söhlde	Behrens Mühle	Sockelgeschoßholländer	1862	Chalk crushing mill. Worked by wind until 1906, then by engine until 1957.	
Sophiensiel		Sockelgeschoßholländer	1775	Under restoration.	
Sorsum	Sorsumer Mühle	Turmholländer			
Spetzerfehn			1818	Struck by lightning and burnt down in 1885.	
Spetzerfehn		Galerieholländer	1885	Working until 1956. Restored 1961.	
Spreda	Borgerdings Mühle	Galerieholländer		Demolished 1988.	
Spreda		Galerieholländer	2007	Used as a cafe.	
Stade	Windmühle am Schiffertor, Wehbers Mühle	Galerieholländer	1871	Working by wind until 1937. Restored 1985–86.	
Stade	Freilichtmuseum Stade	Bockwindmühle	1967	Moved from Rethmar.	
Stapelmoor	Mill site #1			Blown down 1588.	
Stapelmoor	Mill site #1			Standing in 1707.	
Stapelmoor	Mill site #2	Bockwindmühle		Standing in 1707. Demolished 1909.	
Stapelmoor	Stapelmoorer Mühle	Galerieholländer	1911	Worked by wind until 1972, then by electric motor until 1978.	
Stederdorf	Woltersche Mühle	Bockwindmühle	1884	Moved from Salzgitter. Worked by wind until 1940, then by engine until 1963. Restored 1976–82.	
Stederdorf	Metzingsche Mühle	Sockelgeschoßholländer	1882	Worked by wind until 1937. Incorporated into engine driven mill which closed in 1990. Used as a grain store.	
Steinhude		Bockwindmühle	1670	Struck by lightning and destroyed in 1911.	
Steinhude	Paula	Erdholländer	1912	Moved from Broitzem, Braunschweig. Working until 1979. Restored 1991–2000.	
Stöckse	Ahrbecker Mühle, Martha	Bockwindmühle	1870	Moved here from an unknown location. Restored 2003.	
Stroit		Bockwindmühle	1842	Burnt down 1843, suspected arson.	
Stroit		Galerieholländer	1843	Worked by wind until 1930, then by engine until 1962. Restored 1984–99.	
Stumpen	Stumpenser Mühle	Galerieholländer			
Südcoldinne	Tjadens Mühle	Sockelgeschoßholländer	1922	Working until 1975. Restored 1982.	
Sudwalde		Galerieholländer		House conversion.	
Sudwalde		Erdholländer		Derelict	
Suhlendorf	Kaisergarten-Mühle	Bockwindmühle			
Suhlendorf	Waldmühle	Turmholländer		converted to Hotel.	
Sulingen		Erdholländer	1847	Burnt down in 1848.	
Sulingen	Labbus Mühle	Galerieholländer	1851	Working until early 1990s.	
Sulingen	Groß Lessener Mühle	Galerieholländer	1870	Moved to Habbrügge in 1987.	
Syke		Sockelgeschoßholländer		Base remains.	
Syke	Ristedt Mühle	Sockelgeschoßholländer		House conversion	

== T ==
Location	Name of mill	Type	Built	Notes	Photograph
Tannenhausen		Erdholländer	1923	Moved from Buttförde. Restored 1993–94.	
Tappenbeck		Sockelgeschoßholländer			
Tweelbäke		Sockelgeschoßholländer			
Twixlum				A drainage mill with a scoopwheel.	

== U ==
Location	Name of mill	Type	Built	Notes	Photograph
Uelsen		Turmholländer	c.1748	Working until 1928.	
Uelsen		Turmholländer		Restored.	
Upgant-Schott		Bockwindmühle	1569		
Upgant-Schott	Sterrenbergsche Mühle	Galerieholländer	1880	Burnt down in 1934.	
Upgant-Schott	Sterrenbergsche Mühle	Galerieholländer	1934	Working until 1990.	
Uplengen	Remels Mühle	Galerieholländer	1803	Working until 1962.	
Uplengen	Südgeorgsfehn	Galerieholländer	1907	Working until 1954.	
Uplengen	Großoldendorf	Galerieholländer	1887	Worked by wind until 1962m then by engine until 1977.	
Utarp		Galerieholländer		Derelict base remains.	
Uthlede		Erdholländer	1862	Burnt down 1903.	
Uthlede		Turmholländer	1904	Built of base of earlier mill. Worked by wind until 1944, then by engine until 1969. Conserved.	
Uttum				Destroyed in the Christmas Flood of 1717.	
Uttum			c.1718.		
Uttum	Alte Mühle	Galerieholländer	1856	Worked by wind until 1957, then by engine until 1975.	

== V ==
Location	Name of mill	Type	Built	Notes	Photograph
Varel	Grode Möhl; Vareler Mühle	Galerieholländer	1848	Working until 1965. Restored in the 1970s.	
Varel		Galerieholländer		Base only, house conversion.	
Vöhrum		Turmholländer		House conversion	

== W ==
Location	Name of mill	Type	Built	Notes	Photograph
Waddewarden		Galerieholländer	Mid-C19th.	Struck by lightning and burnt down 11 August 1963. Only the base remained, it was converted to a house in 1979.	
Wagenfeld	Köstersche Mühle	Galerieholländer	1859	Corn and saw mill. Working until 1942.	
Wagenfeld	Neustädter Mühle	Galerieholländer			
Wallenhorst	Lechtingen	Turmholländer	1887	Working until 1970, latterly by engine. Restored 1982–87.	
Wallhöfen	Wallhöfener Mühle	Galerieholländer	1880	House conversion.	
Wangerland		Holländerwindmühle		Base only.	
Wangerland	Tengshausener Mühle	Sockelgeschoßholländer		House conversion.	
Warmsen	Hoyersvörde	Galerieholländer			
Warmsen	Mösloh	Erdholländer	1860	Worked by wind until 1960, then by engine until 1975. Restored 1989–92.	
Wedehorn	Wedehorner Mühle	Galerieholländer	1878	House conversion.	
Weener		Holländerwinmühle	1786	Dismantled 1977, re-erected at Nijeveen, Drenthe, Netherlands.	
Weenermoor	Fluttermühle Weenermoor	Fluttermühle	2000		
Welle	Kampener Mühle	Galerieholländer			
Wendhausen	Windmühle Wendhausen	Bergholländer	1837	Five sails	
Werdum				Standing in 1540.	
Werdum		Bockwindmühle	1748	Blown down 4 September 1801.	
Werdum		Erdholländer	1802	Worked by wind until 1930, then by engine until 1971. Restored 1973.	
Werlte	Kreutzmann's Mühle	Galerieholländer	1881	Burnt down in the 1920s. Base survived as an engine driven mill.	
Werlte	Kreutzmann's Mühle	Galerieholländer	1993		
Westeraccum	Westeraccumer Mühle	Galerieholländer	1740	Burnt down early C20th. Base survived as an engine driven mill. In use until 1980.	
Westeraccum	Westeraccummer Mühle	Galerieholländer	2000	Moved from Westerende.	
Westerbur		Galerieholländer	1870	House conversion.	
Westerende		Sockelgeschoßholländer		Worked until the Second World War. Stood derelict until dismantled in 1994 and moved to Westeraccum.	
Westerstede	Garnholt Mühle	Galerieholländer		Base remains.	
Westerstede	Lindern Mühle	Galerieholländer		House converted.	
Westerstede	Ocholt Mühle	Galerieholländer		Base remains.	
Westerstede	Torsholt Mühle	Galerieholländer	1882	Conserved.	
Westerstede		Holländerwindmühle	1811	Moved to Hüllstede.	
Westgroßfehn		Galerieholländer			
Westoverledingen	Völlenerfehn	Galerieholländer	1814	Rebuilt 1958 incorporating a drainage mill from Riepsterhammrich placed on top of the original smock. Demolished c.2009.	
Wichtringhausen		Galerieholländer			
Wiefels	Wiefelser Mühle	Sockelgeschoßholländer		House conversion.	
Wiegboldsur		Galerieholländer			
Wietmarschen	Langemannsche Mühle	Holländerwindmühle	1789	Burnt down 1889. The base survived, which was used as a granary.	
Wietmarschen	Langemannsch Mühle	Holländerwindmühle	2003	Used as a cafe and restaurant.	
Wilhelmshaven	Kopperhörner Mühle	Galerieholländer	1839		
Wingst		Sockelgeschoßholländer		House conversion.	
Winsen an der Aller		Bockwindmühle	C15th	Burnt down in 1628.	
Winsen an der Aller		Bockwindmühle	c.1628	Gone by 1732.	
Winsen an der Aller	Winser Mühle	Bockwindmühle	1732	Worked until 1929. Purchased by the town of Winsen an der Aller in 1930. Restored in 1968 and 1984.	
Wippingen		Galerieholländer			
Wirdum	Doppelkolbenmühle Wirdum	Pumpmühle	1872		
Wittmund	Peldemühle	Galerieholländer	1741	Working until 1974. Restored 1986.	
Wittmund	Mill on site of Sjuts Mühle	Bockwindmühle	1648	Burnt down 1884.	
Wittmund	Sjuts Mühle	Galerieholländer	1885	Working until 1978. Converted to restaurant.	
Witzendorf		Sockelgeschoßholländer		House conversion.	
Worpswede	Ostersoder Mühle	Sockelgeschoßholländer		House converted	
Worpswede	Worpsweder Mühle	Bockwindmühle	1700	Worked a single pair of millstones. Demolished 1838.	
Worpswede	Worpsweder Mühle	Erdholländer	1838	Replaced earlier post mill, three pairs of millstones. Worked by wind until 1890, then by diesel engine, which was replaced by an electric motor in 1944. Restored in 1956 and again from 1990–95.	
Wybelsum	Petersen			A drainage mill, stood in Wybelsumer Hammrich.	
Wybelsum			1847	A drainage mill. Demolished in 1931.	
Wybelsum			1862	A drainage mill. Demolished in 1931.	

== Z ==
Location	Name of mill	Type	Built	Notes	Photograph
Zweidorf		Erdholländer	1868		
