= Bundesstraße 446 =

Federal highway in Germany

B 446
- Bundesstraße 446
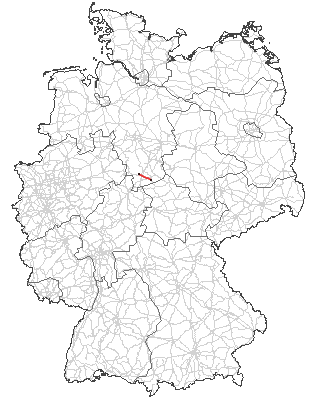

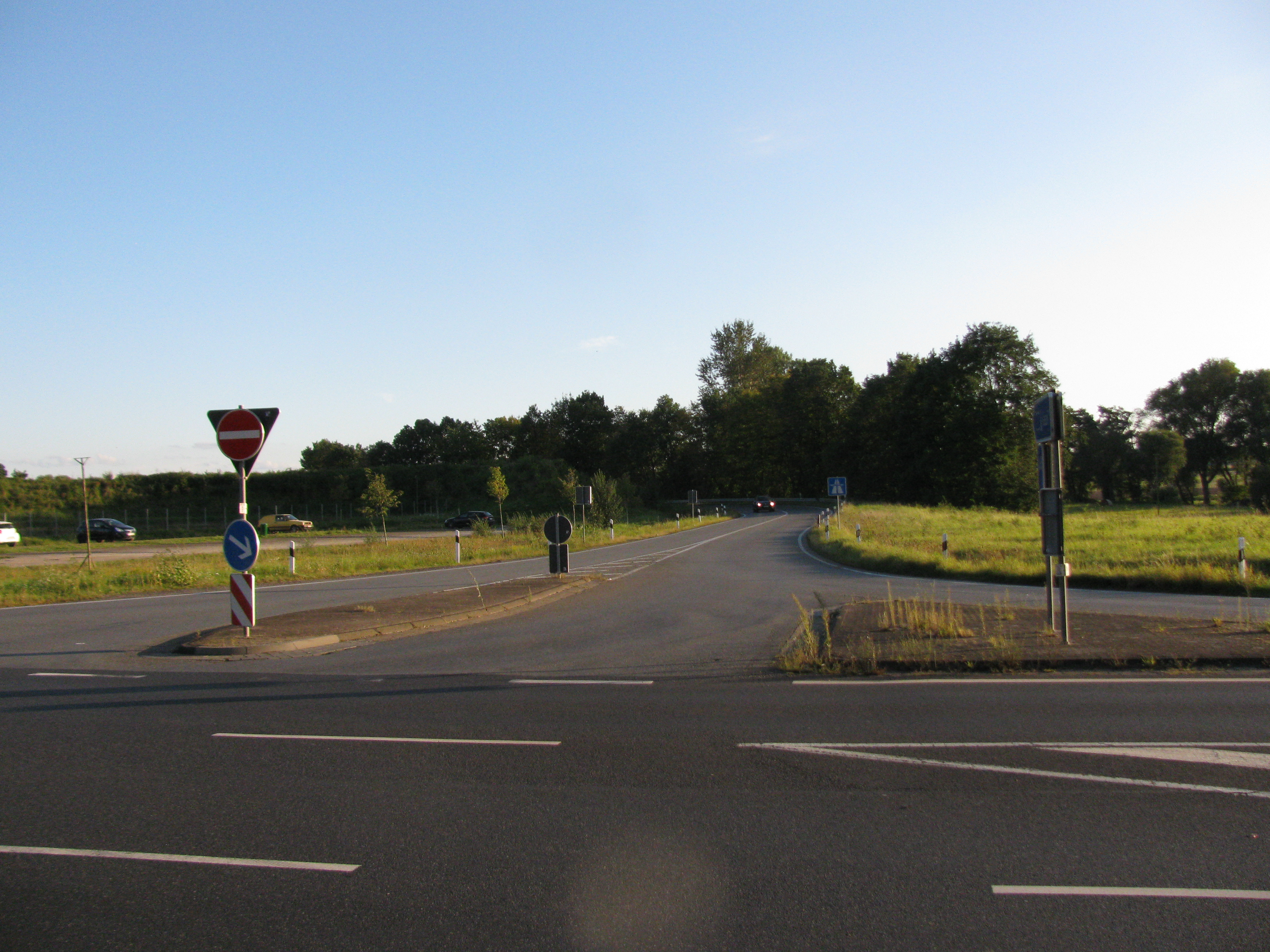

Route information
- Length: 38 km (24 mi)

Major junctions
- Northwest end: Hardegsen
- Southeast end: Ebergötzen

Location
- Country: Germany
- States: Lower Saxony

Highway system
- Roads in Germany; Autobahns; List; Federal; List; State; E-roads

The Bundesstraße 446 (abbr: B 446) is a German federal road in southern Lower Saxony.

The B 446 begins east of the town of Hardegsen as an extension of the B 241 as the latter swings towards the north. After about four kilometres the B 446 crosses the A 7 motorway at the Nörten-Hardenberg junction and after, another kilometre, the B 3. It passes through Flecken Nörten-Hardenberg and continues in a southeasterly direction to Ebergötzen.

The section between the Holzerode and Ebergötzen is known as the Hölle ("hell") by the locals because of the high rock outcrops immediately to the side of the road and dense stands of trees (e.g. "You drive through the Hölle."). Near Ebergötzen the B 446 meets the B 27, and they run together for about 2 kilometres in a northeastern direction, before the B 27 branches off again to the southeast. The remaining section of the B 446 runs through the villages of Seeburg, Seulingen and Esplingerode and finally ends in Duderstadt at the B 247. From a car park south of Seeburg there are good views of the lake of the Seeburger See and its surrounding countryside.

The total length of the B 446 is about 38 kilometres.

== Junction lists ==
Legend:

- I/C - Interchange, I/S - Intersection, RSA - Rest and service area, OBR - Overhead bridge restaurant, R/R - Restaurant and rest plaza, L/B - Layby, V/P - Vista point, TN - tunnel, T/P - Toll plaza, BR - Bridge
- C - Cloverleaf, S - Stack, T-A - Trumpet-A, T-B - Trumpet-B, DT - Directional-T/Y, SDT - Semi-Directional-T/Y, P-Y - Partial-Y, D - Diamond, P-C - Partial cloverleaf, D-D - Diverging diamond, D-R - Direct ramp

	Hardegsen B 241
(71)	Nörten-Hardenberg A 7
	Nörten-Hardenberg B 3
	Ebergötzen B 27
	Seeburg (Niedersachsen)
	Seulingen
	Duderstadt B 247

== See also ==
- List of federal roads in Germany
