= Tjaskers in Germany =

A Fluttermühle (Dutch: tjasker) is a type of small drainage windmill used in the Netherlands and Germany. There are six fluttermühle remaining in Germany, all in Lower Saxony.

== Locations ==
=== Bedekaspel ===
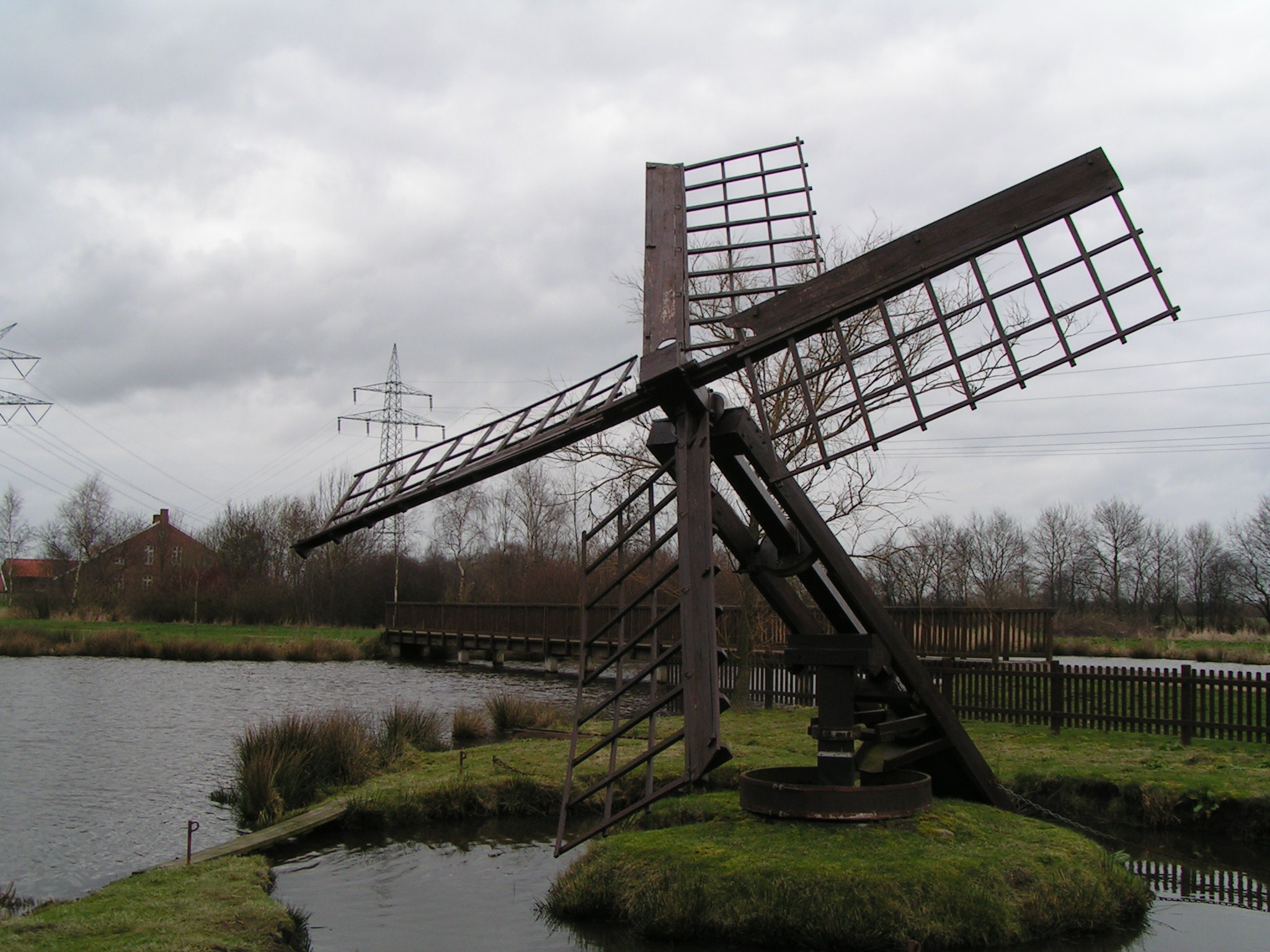
Fluttermühle Lütjegaste

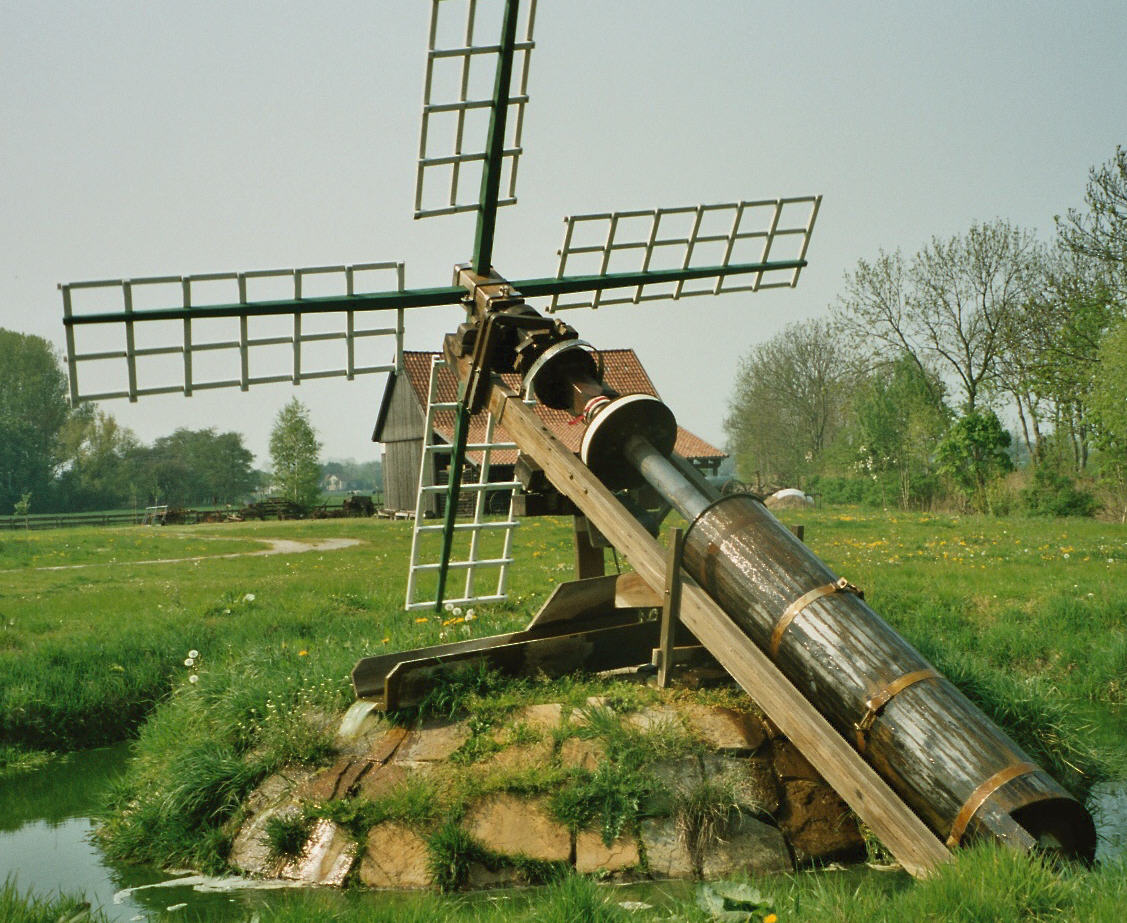
Fluttermühle Moorsee

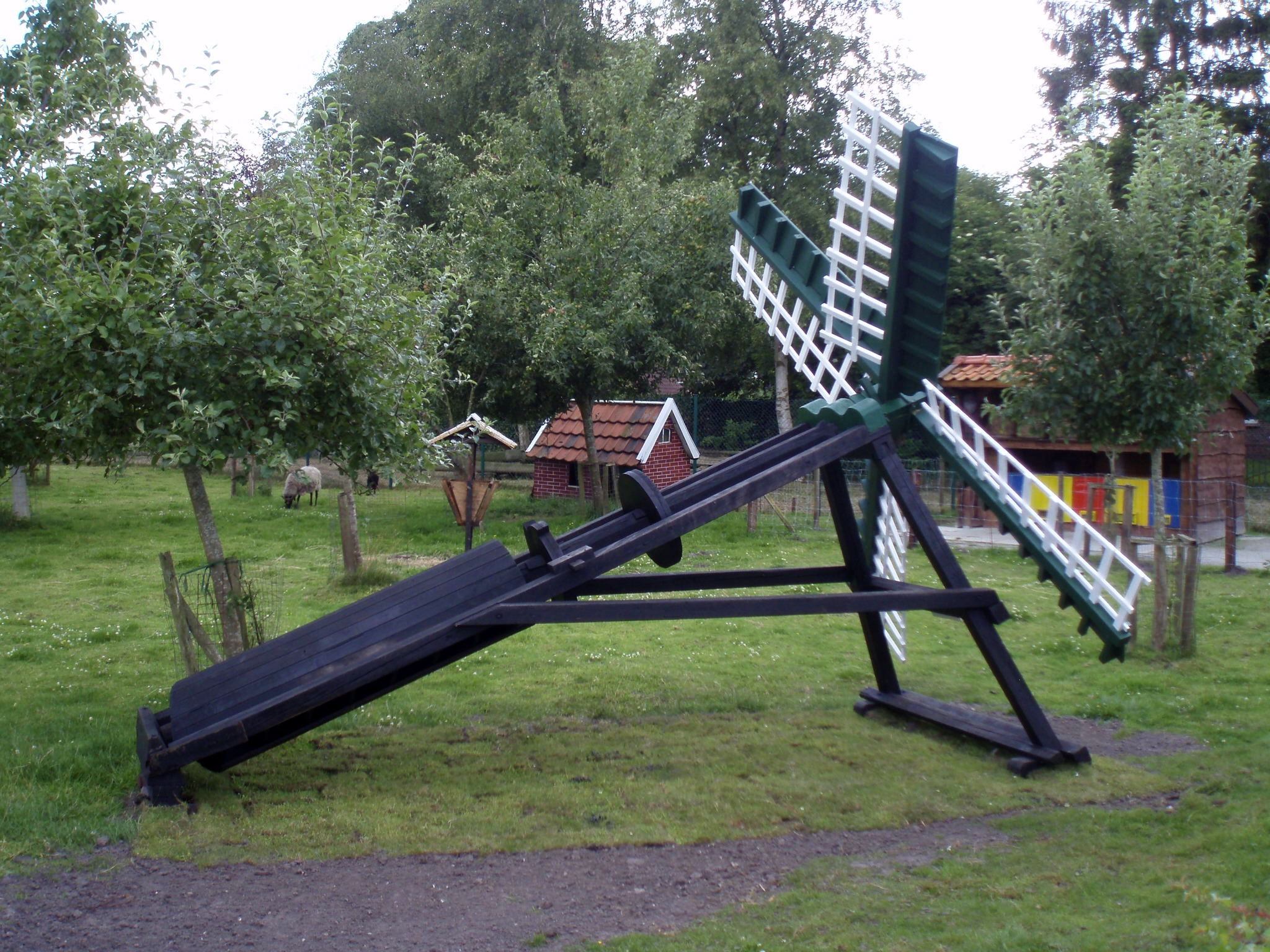
Fluttermühle Münkeboe

53.449548°N 7.308633°E
The boktjasker of Bedekaspel is located near the drainage smock mill Agnes. The system of ditches do not form a complete circle so the mill can only operate with southerly to westerly winds. In 2011 the mill was in a state of disrepair.

=== Grotegaste/Lütjegaste ===
53.169005°N 7.422895°E
The paaltjasker is located west of Ihrhove near the hamlet Grotegaste and was built in 2000 by millwright Richard Kluin from Ihrhove, together with the fluttermühle of Weenermoor (see below). The mill has four Common sails and is fully functional.

=== Moorsee ===
53.395703°N 8.427576°E
The paaltjasker is located next to the Moorseer Mühle and is part of its museum. The mill has four Common sails.

=== Münkeboe ===
53.515481°N 7.374847°E
The boktjasker is part of the village museum Münkeboe. It is a non functional replica or model.

=== Riepe ===
53.395703°N 7.330756°E
The boktjasker was built in 1986 as a replica of this type of mill that was once common in the region. The tjasker has four symmetrical Common sails that can be covered with wooden slats. The photo in the database of the Deutsche Gesellschaft für Mühlenkunde und Mühlenerhaltung (DGM) shows it having a complete circular ditch system for winding, however recently dated photos show it in a static position taking water directly from a lake.

=== Weenermoor ===
53.211584°N 7.355336°E
The paaltjasker is located between Weenermoor and Sankt Georgiwold and was built by millwright Richard Kluin from Ihrhove in 2000. The mill was constructed as a nature compensation measure for the construction of the Weenermoor wind farm and is used to raise the water table in a nature reserve. The mill has four Common sails which have a span of 7.10 metres (23 ft 4 in). Winding the mill to face the wind is not possible. The frame has been stiffened by cables to prevent sagging.

== See also ==
- List of windmills in Lower Saxony
