= Bokensdorf =

- Municipality
- Coat of arms

- Location of Bokensdorf within Gifhorn district
- Interactive map of Bokensdorf
- Location within Germany Location within Lower Saxony
- Coordinates: 52°29′52″N 10°42′52″E
- Country: Germany
- State: Lower Saxony
- District: Gifhorn
- Municipal assoc.: Boldecker Land

Government
  - Mayor: Norbert Hoffmann

Area
  - Total: 14.49 km^{2} (5.59 sq mi)
- Elevation: 72 m (236 ft)

Population (2025-12-31)
  - Total: 1,240
  - Density: 85.6/km^{2} (222/sq mi)
- Time zone: UTC+01:00 (CET)
  - Summer (DST): UTC+02:00 (CEST)
- Postal codes: 38556
- Dialling codes: 05366
- Vehicle registration: GF

Bokensdorf is a municipality in the district of Gifhorn, in Lower Saxony, Germany.
