= Jembke =

- Municipality
- Coat of arms

- Location of Jembke within Gifhorn district
- Interactive map of Jembke
- Location within Germany Location within Lower Saxony
- Coordinates: 52°29′50″N 10°45′36″E
- Country: Germany
- State: Lower Saxony
- District: Gifhorn
- Municipal assoc.: Boldecker Land

Government
  - Mayor: Lars Riemenschneider

Area
  - Total: 14.57 km^{2} (5.63 sq mi)
- Elevation: 57 m (187 ft)

Population (2025-12-31)
  - Total: 2,097
  - Density: 143.9/km^{2} (372.8/sq mi)
- Time zone: UTC+01:00 (CET)
  - Summer (DST): UTC+02:00 (CEST)
- Postal codes: 38477
- Dialling codes: 05366
- Vehicle registration: GF

Jembke is a municipality in the district of Gifhorn, in Lower Saxony, Germany.

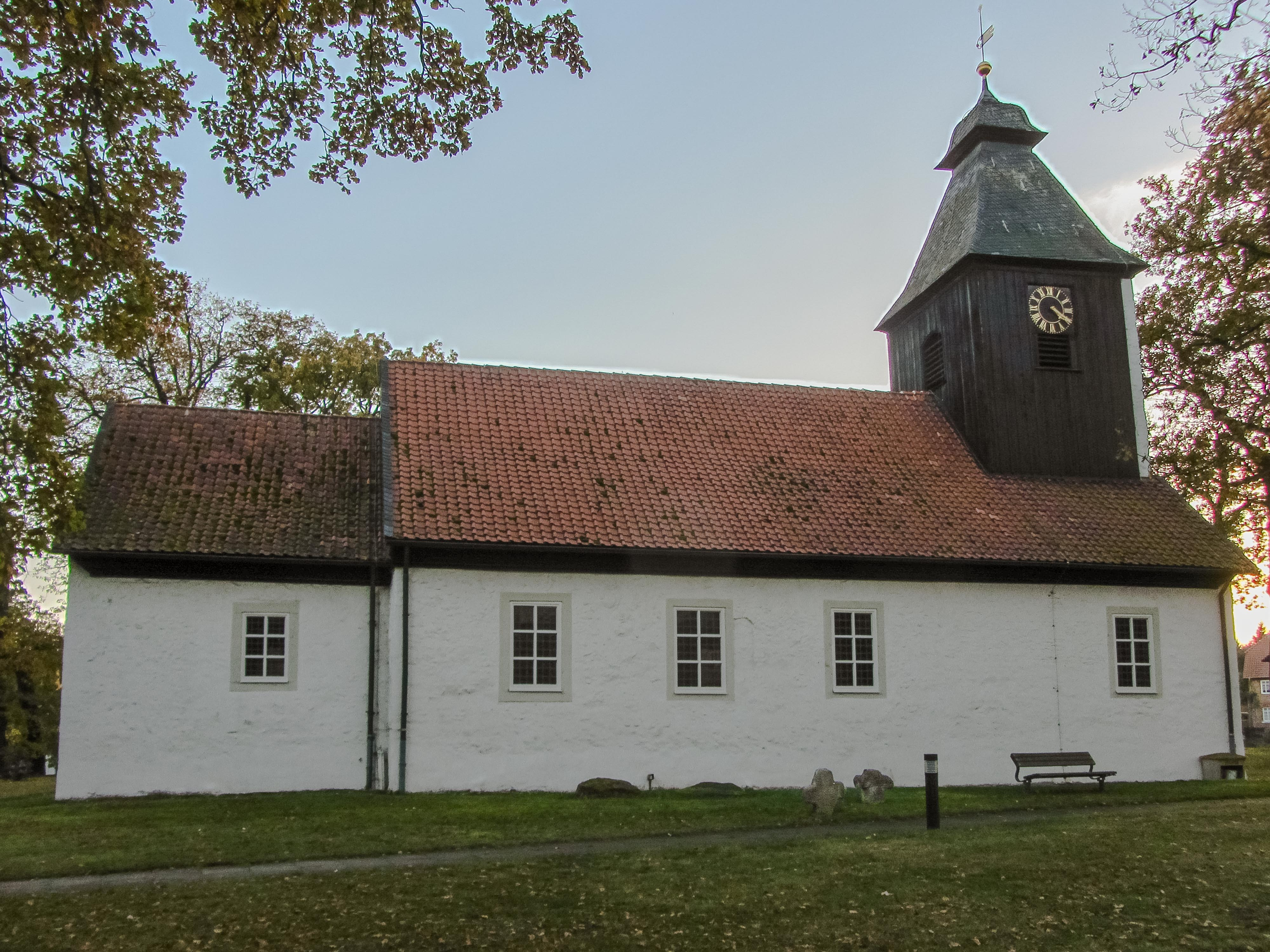
Lutheran Saint George Church
