= Wendhausen Windmill =

19th century tower mill in Lehre, Lower Saxony, Germany

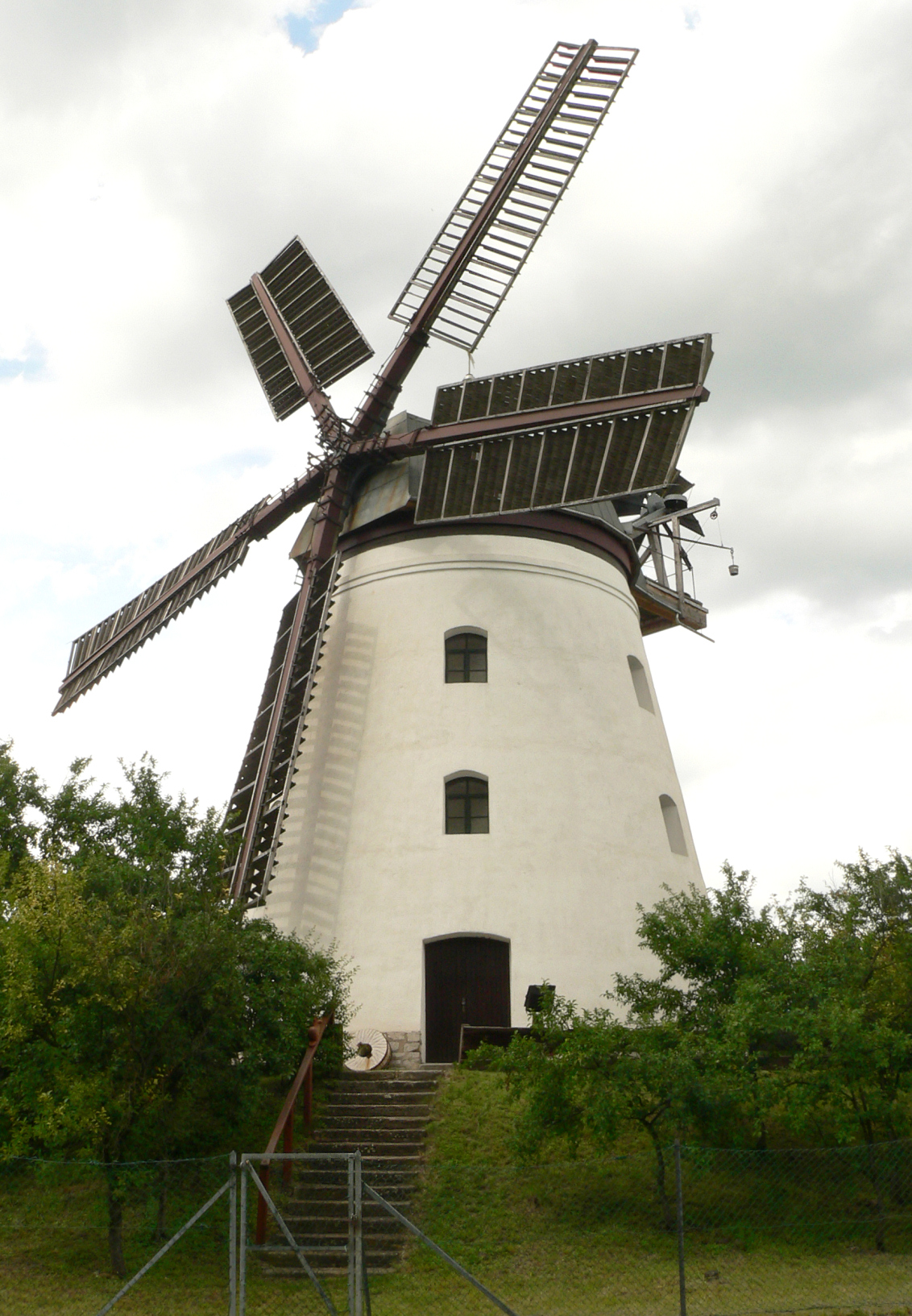

Origin
- Mill name: Windmühle Wendhausen
- Mill location: Hauptstrasse 3, Wendhausen, Lehre
- Coordinates: 52°18′58.464″N 10°37′57.849″E
- Operator(s): Verein zur Erhaltung und Förderung der Holländer-Windmühle Wendhausen eV
- Year built: 1837

Information
- Purpose: Flour mill
- Type: Tower mill
- Storeys: Four storey tower
- No. of sails: Five sails
- Type of sails: Patent sails
- Windshaft: Cast iron
- Winding: Fantail

The Wendhausen Windmill (German: Windmühle Wendhausen) is a tower mill located in Wendhausen, a town within the municipality of Lehre, Lower Saxony, Germany. Built in 1837, it is the only five-sailed windmill in Germany still in operation.

== History ==
=== Watermill ===
Prior to 1837, a watermill was located on the Schunter River that flows through Wendhausen. Records show that a watermill was in use as early as 1491 in Wendhausen. The mill had three pairs of millstones.

=== Windmill ===
In 1837 brothers Carl and Eduard Vieweg, publishers from nearby Braunschweig, replaced the Schunter watermill with a nearby windmill. They wanted to build a paper mill to produce paper for their own publishing house and to have it powered using the wind. The brothers were given permission to build the windmill as long as, within one year, they provided as much mill grinding capacity for the Wendhausen area as they had with the three millstones from the watermill. A Dutch-style windmill with five sails was chosen to provide additional power and could accommodate more grinding and milling than traditional and older post mills. Such windmills are rare and it is the only one of its kind in Germany and. It was built with parts from England so it conformed to the English measuring system. Its three pairs of millstones were driven by a cast iron drive train that was new and unknown in Germany at that time.

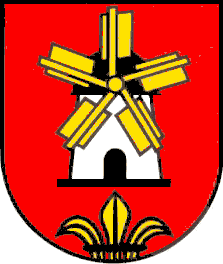
Coat of arms of Wendhausen

The windmill ceased operations during World War I. In 1927 the mill was fitted with an electric motor and the sails were removed. In 1936 Wendhausen was declared a "National Socialist model village" and the sails were replaced only for the purpose of decoration. A small fire in the basement in 1951 caused no major damage and two years later the mill ceased operations.

The coat of arms of Wendhausen (pictured) includes the windmill as its main symbol.

== Renovations ==
Many renovations and reconstructions have taken place since the first major activities took place in the late 1950s. One of the first was funded by the Volkswagen company in Wolfsburg and later in 1972 by the community of Wendhausen with the help of the county of Braunschweig. Additional damage to the windmill came in 1975 during a storm when the windmill failed to turn into the wind and the sails were damaged. In 1980, the land and mill were purchased by the Municipality of Lehre and an association was founded by local citizens and politicians to preserve and promote the windmill. For the 150th anniversary in 1987, extensive restoration work on the milling operation, elevators, motor, belt protective cover were completed to demonstrate the millstone operation. Throughout the 1990s and early 2000s, continual renovations took place and many parts replaced and updated. Additional funds came from the greater European Community, the state of Lower Saxony, LB Public Foundation, and the United Brunswick monastery and study funds.

In 2012, the windmill again underwent renovations costing €418,000, much of which came from the German federal government and the State Conservation Office. Work was on the sails and the current plans are to have the windmill functioning again at the end of 2015.

The first wedding at the windmill was held in 2001. Guided tours are also available when the windmill is open.

== See also ==
- List of windmills in Lower Saxony
- International Wind- and Watermill Museum – Located in nearby Gifhorn
