= Boldecker Land =

- Samtgemeinde
- Coat of arms

- Location of Boldecker Land within Gifhorn district
- Interactive map of Boldecker Land
- Location within Germany Location within Lower Saxony
- Coordinates: 52°28′N 10°43′E
- Country: Germany
- State: Lower Saxony
- District: Gifhorn

Government
  - Mayor (2021–26): Dennis Ehrhoff

Area
  - Total: 69.56 km^{2} (26.86 sq mi)
- Elevation: 56 m (184 ft)

Population (2025-12-31)
  - Total: 10,909
  - Density: 156.8/km^{2} (406.2/sq mi)
- Time zone: UTC+01:00 (CET)
  - Summer (DST): UTC+02:00 (CEST)
- Vehicle registration: GF
- Website: Boldecker-Land.de

Boldecker Land is a municipality in the district of Gifhorn, in Lower Saxony, Germany. It is situated along the river Aller, approx. 12 km east of Gifhorn, and 8 km northwest of Wolfsburg. Its seat is in the village Weyhausen.

== Politics ==
=== Samtgemeinde council ===
- CDU 8 Seats
- SPD 9 Seats
- WBL 6 Seats
- BBB 1 Seat

=== Structure of Boldecker Land ===
Structure of the Municipality
Town	Inhabitants (31. June 2005)	Surface: in km^{2}	Population density in inhabitants/km^{2}
Barwedel	1 077	19.8	54
Bokensdorf	950	14.49	66
Jembke	1 936	14.57	133
Tappenbeck	1 329	5.11	260
Osloß	1 981	7.64	259
Weyhausen	2 648	7.98	332
