= Waake =

- Municipality
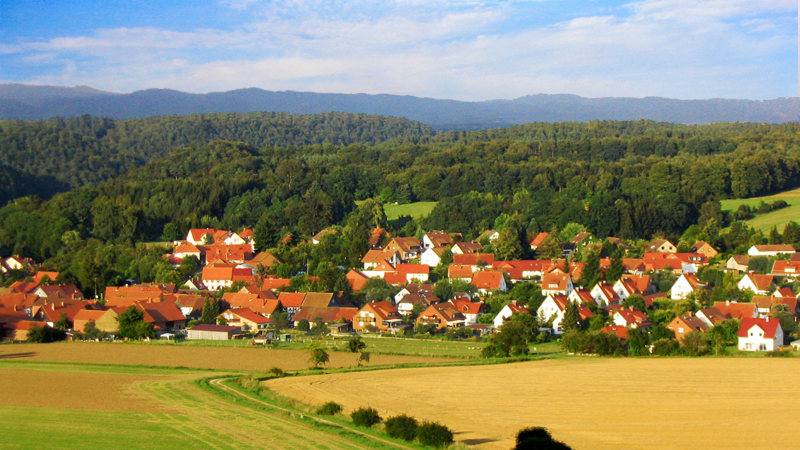
- General view

- Flag Coat of arms

- Location of Waake within Göttingen district
- Interactive map of Waake
- Location within Germany Location within Lower Saxony
- Coordinates: 51°33′N 10°03′E
- Country: Germany
- State: Lower Saxony
- District: Göttingen
- Municipal assoc.: Radolfshausen

Government
  - Mayor: Johann-Karl Vietor

Area
  - Total: 7.9 km^{2} (3.1 sq mi)
- Elevation: 274 m (899 ft)

Population (2025-12-31)
  - Total: 1,251
  - Density: 160/km^{2} (410/sq mi)
- Time zone: UTC+01:00 (CET)
  - Summer (DST): UTC+02:00 (CEST)
- Postal codes: 37136
- Dialling codes: 05507
- Vehicle registration: GÖ
- Website: https://waake.de/

Waake (German pronunciation: [ˈvaːkə]) is a municipality in the district of Göttingen, in Lower Saxony, Germany.
