= Radolfshausen =

Collection of municipalities in Lower Saxony, Germany

- Samtgemeinde
- Location of Radolfshausen within Göttingen district
- Interactive map of Radolfshausen
- Location within Germany Location within Lower Saxony
- Coordinates: 51°34′N 10°06′E
- Country: Germany
- State: Lower Saxony
- District: Göttingen
- Seat: Ebergötzen
- Subdivisions: 5 municipalities

Area
  - Total: 68.38 km^{2} (26.40 sq mi)

Population (2025-12-31)
  - Total: 7,263
  - Density: 106.2/km^{2} (275.1/sq mi)
- Time zone: UTC+01:00 (CET)
  - Summer (DST): UTC+02:00 (CEST)
- Website: www.radolfshausen.de

Radolfshausen is a Samtgemeinde ("collective municipality") in the district of Göttingen, in Lower Saxony, Germany. It is situated approximately 15 km east of Göttingen. Its seat is in the village Ebergötzen.

The Samtgemeinde Radolfshausen consists of the following municipalities:

1. Ebergötzen
2. Landolfshausen
3. Seeburg
4. Seulingen
5. Waake
