= Tappenbeck =

- Municipality
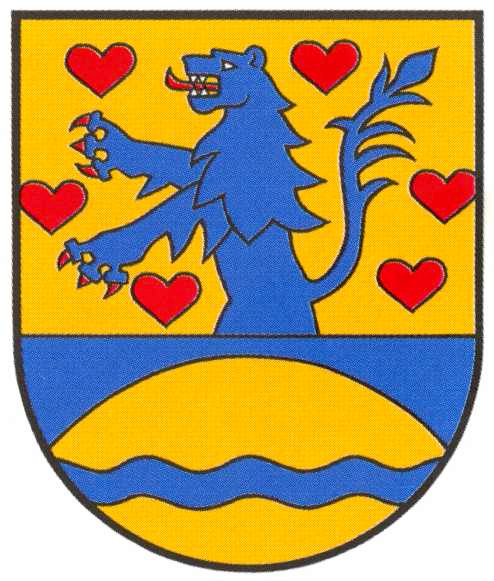
- Coat of arms

- Location of Tappenbeck within Gifhorn district
- Interactive map of Tappenbeck
- Location within Germany Location within Lower Saxony
- Coordinates: 52°28′N 10°45′E
- Country: Germany
- State: Lower Saxony
- District: Gifhorn
- Municipal assoc.: Boldecker Land

Government
  - Mayor: Niklas Herbermann

Area
  - Total: 5.11 km^{2} (1.97 sq mi)
- Elevation: 69 m (226 ft)

Population (2025-12-31)
  - Total: 1,594
  - Density: 312/km^{2} (808/sq mi)
- Time zone: UTC+01:00 (CET)
  - Summer (DST): UTC+02:00 (CEST)
- Postal codes: 38479
- Dialling codes: 05366
- Vehicle registration: GF

Tappenbeck is a municipality in the district of Gifhorn, in Lower Saxony, Germany.
