= Tjasker =

Simple windmill for drainage purposes

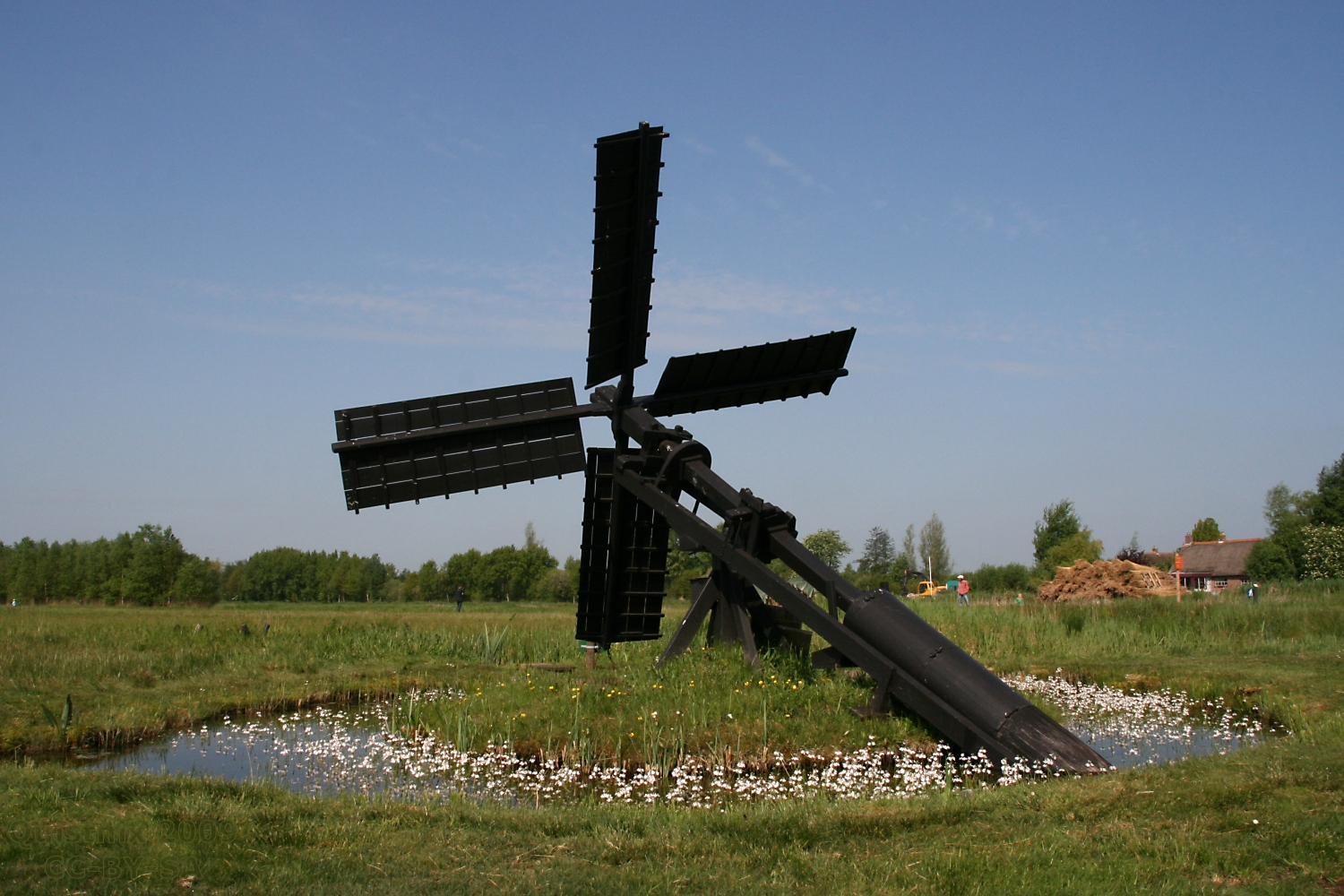
Tjasker Ossenzijl

Video of a Tjasker in Feanwâlden

The tjasker (West Frisian: jasker, German: Fluttermühle) is a small type of windmill used solely for drainage purposes. It is distinctive for its simple construction, featuring only a single inclined shaft that carries the sails on one end and an Archimedes' screw on the other, in this way avoiding the need for any gearing. The tjasker is commonly known as a typical Frisian windmill though it is also found in other Dutch provinces and in north Germany.

== History ==
The tjasker seems to have been developed somewhere towards the end of the 16th century, though there is no conclusive date for its invention. The total number of tjaskers at their peak is also unclear. The mills were used to drain small plots of land but also found their use at peat digging sites as they could be easily moved. Millwright Roelof Dijksma of Giethoorn was well known for his tjasker building. He constructed 400 to 500 tjaskers between 1910 and 1945, though these numbers include hand powered Archimedes' screws. In the first half of the 20th century tjaskers almost completely disappeared as they couldn't compete with the metal windpump which was more practical as it could turn itself to face the wind and didn't require any supervision. The last tjasker was erected in 1935 and by 1963 there were only three left in the Netherlands. In that year emerging views on nature preservation and cultural history resulted in the installation of a brand new tjasker in De Weerribben. Since then, several other new tjaskers have been built, to pump water into wetlands and as cultural monuments. Currently, there are 28 tjaskers in the Netherlands and six tjaskers in Germany.

== Description ==
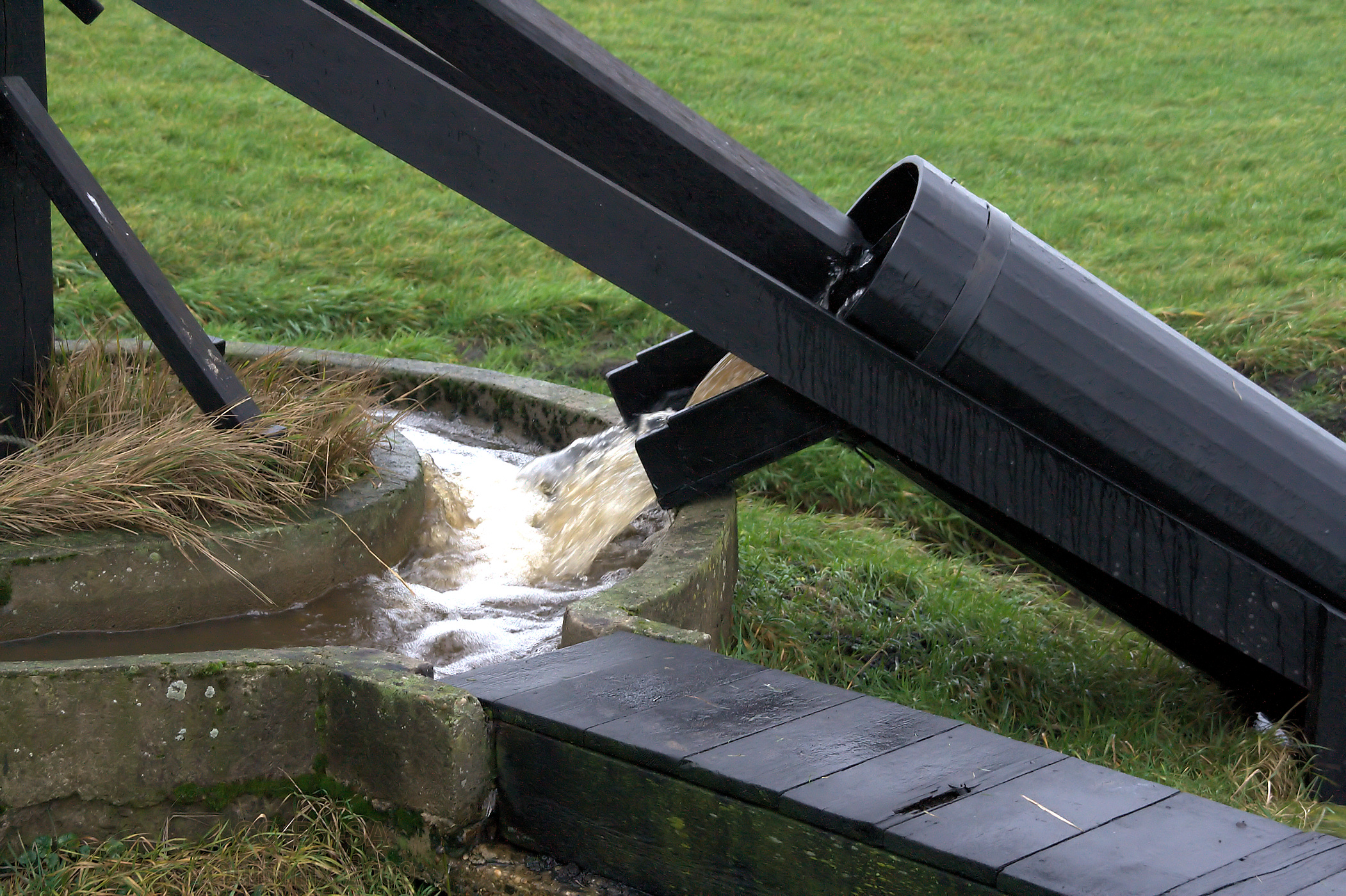
Detail of a working tjasker

The tjasker has only one wooden millshaft on which all machinery is carried. This shaft is inclined at an angle of approximately 30° and supported in a wooden frame. On the lower end it carries the Archimedean screw which is partly submerged in water. The screw doesn't rotate in a pipe but has a fixed encasing which simplifies the design further. The top end of the shaft carries the Common sails with a span of approximately 5 to 6 meters. In some cases wooden slats are used instead of sail cloth. The mill can be stopped using a band brake on the brake disc which is fitted on the shaft behind the top bearing.

=== Paaltjasker and boktjasker ===
The entire mill has to be rotated to face the wind. To accomplish this two types of tjasker have been developed. In the first type, known as paaltjasker (English: post tjasker), the mill is supported on and turned around a central post. The Archimedes' screw pumps water from the outer circular ditch to a central circular ditch or pool. The screw moves in a circle when the mill is turned so these circular ditches enable the mill to function in whatever direction it is pointing. Only the outlet from the central pool taking the raised water across the outer circular ditch prevents the use of the mill facing opposite that particular direction as the screw would collide with the water outlet.

The second type of tjasker, the boktjasker (English: trestle tjasker), is not balanced on a central post but supported on a trestle. The lower submerged support is fixed, the mill is rotated around this point, while the other end is movable. Here the trestle is commonly equipped with rollers or wheels on a fixed ring to make winding easier. In this method of construction the Archimedes' screw takes water from a central pool and deposits it in a circular ditch that surrounds the central pool. Water can be taken to the central pool by a pipe or a gap in the circular ditch. Besides the structural differences, a typical paaltjasker is designed so it can relatively easily be dismantled to be moved to another location or stored indoors though nowadays this feature is rarely used. A boktjasker is more or less fixed to its location.

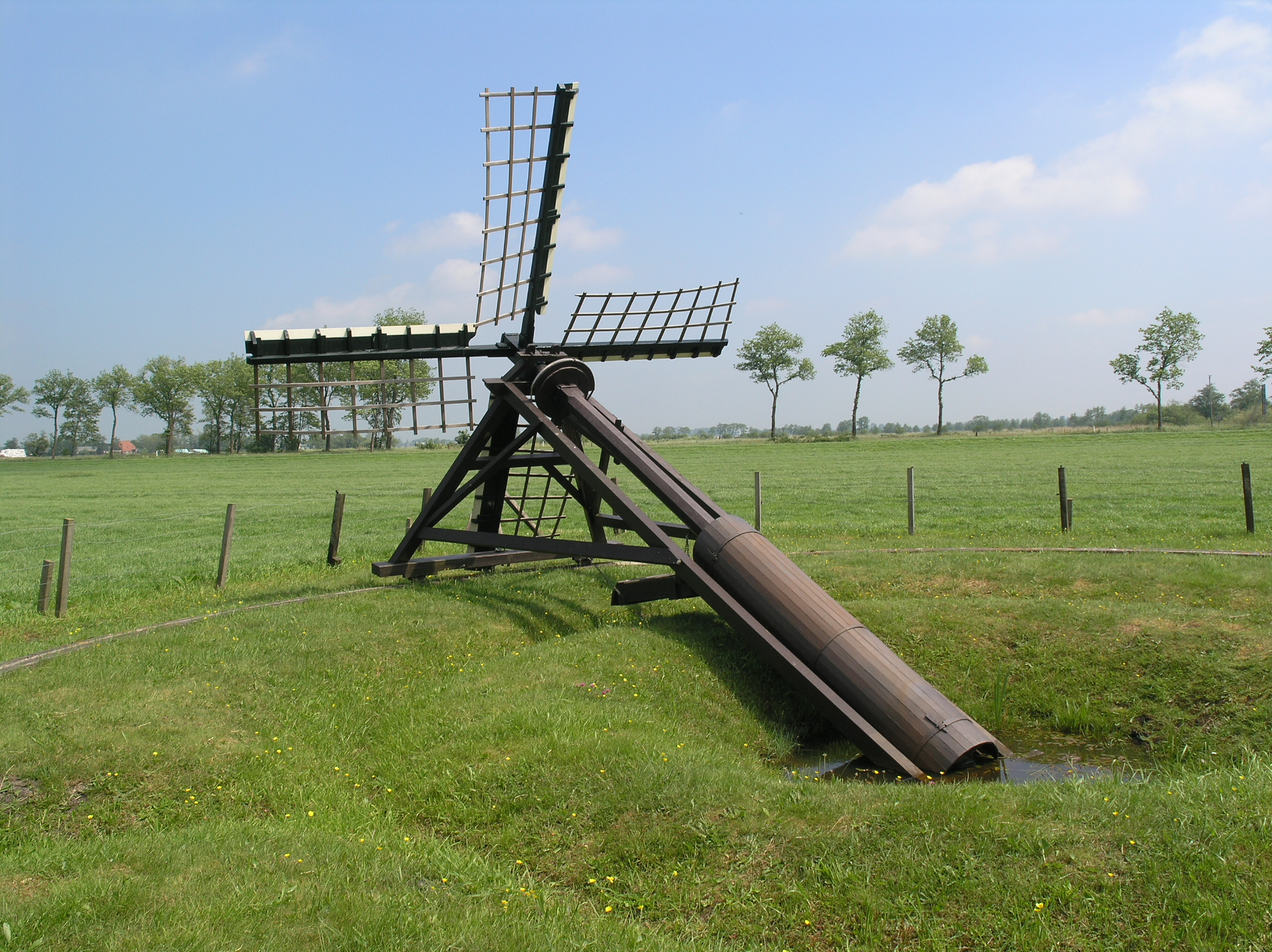
Example of a boktjasker. Tjasker Augustinusga in 2007

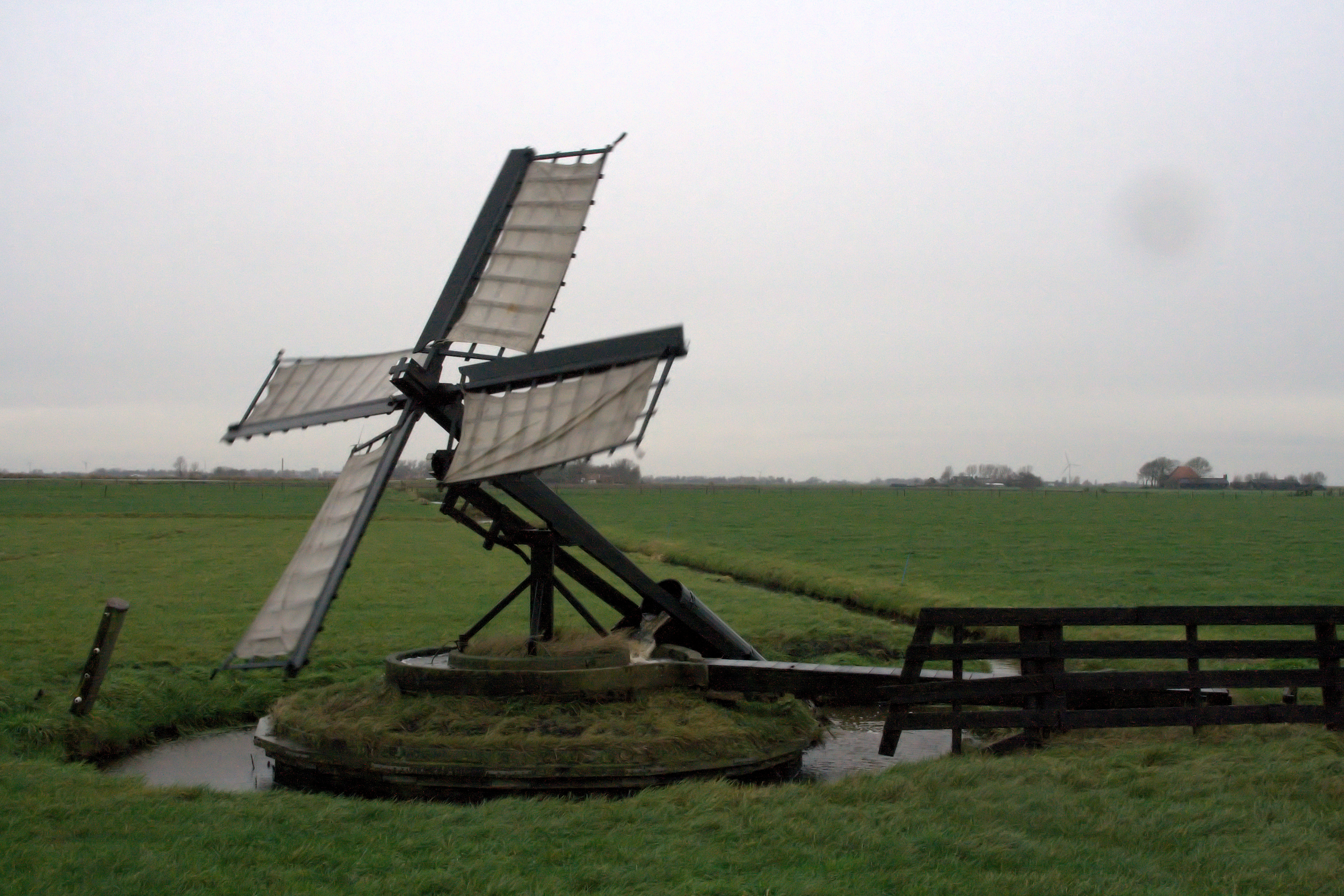
Example of a paaltjasker. Tjasker It Heidenskip in 2009

=== Staarttjasker ===
A third type of tjasker has been rediscovered from old drawings. It has a tail keeping the mill facing in the wind and a scoop wheel instead of an Archimedes' screw. After having built a functional model the reconstruction of a full sized staarttjasker (English: tail tjasker) is now planned.

== In popular culture ==
- A tjasker is seen in the Duran Duran 1984 music video for The Wild Boys, with the lead singer Simon Le Bon strapped to the blade dunked in the water with every rotation.
