= European Bread Museum =

Museum in Germany

Coordinates: 51°34′08″N 10°05′59″E

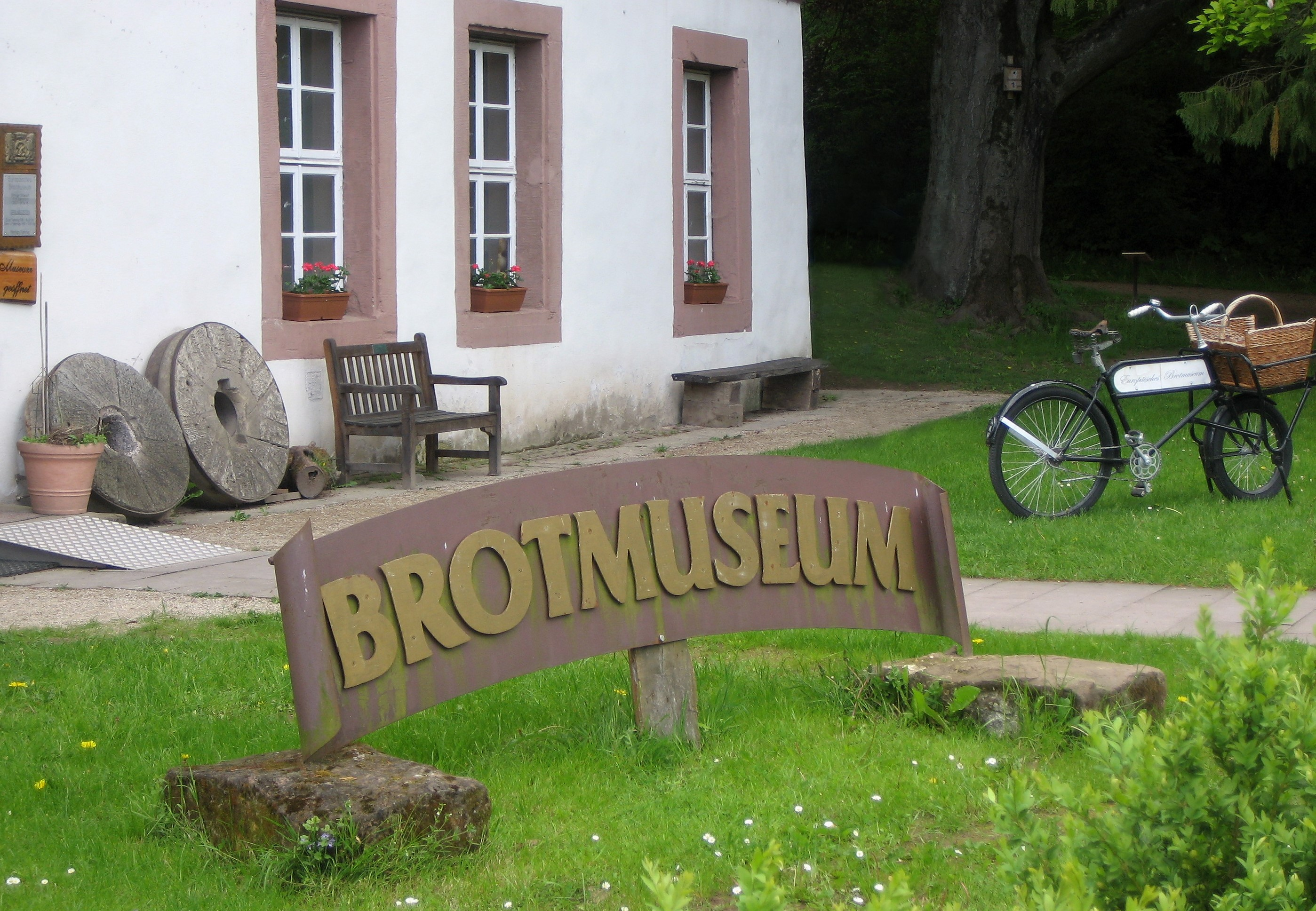
The European Bread Museum

The European Bread Museum (German: Europäisches Brotmuseum), in Ebergötzen in South Lower Saxony, Germany, is a rurally located museum dedicated to the historical development of breadmaking and related subjects in Europe.

== History ==
The museum was founded in 1970, with it opening officially in 1971. It was originally located in Mollenfelde. The museum was inaugurated by Federal Minister of Food, Josef Ertl and the Lower Saxony Minister of Agriculture, Peter Bruns. The museum moved to its current location in 1999, reopening in 2000 after renovations to the building.

In 2014, German Bread Culture was added to the UNESCO list of Intangible cultural heritage for the country.

== Collection ==
The museum houses the collection named "Vom Korn zum Brot" (English: From Corn to Bread) which shows the cultural and historical significance of bread and its development. Through displays and demonstrations, the museum shows the history of grain farming in Europe, processing of grain, milling, baking of bread, bread in art, and other subjects. In addition to this, medicinal gardens, functioning re-constructed ovens (beginning with those from the Neolithic period), a windmill (built in 1812), a watermill (originally from Tyrol), bread wagons, farm machinery, documents, and tools and equipment for preparing bread are among the objects on display.

The museum is housed in the former Radolfshausen Forestry Office building, a Baroque building with over 500m² of exhibition space. In addition, there is 1 hectare (2.5 acres) of outdoor exhibition space.

== See also ==
- Bread in Europe#Germany
- List of food and beverage museums
