= Scharrel =

Scharrel Skäddel
- Village of Saterland
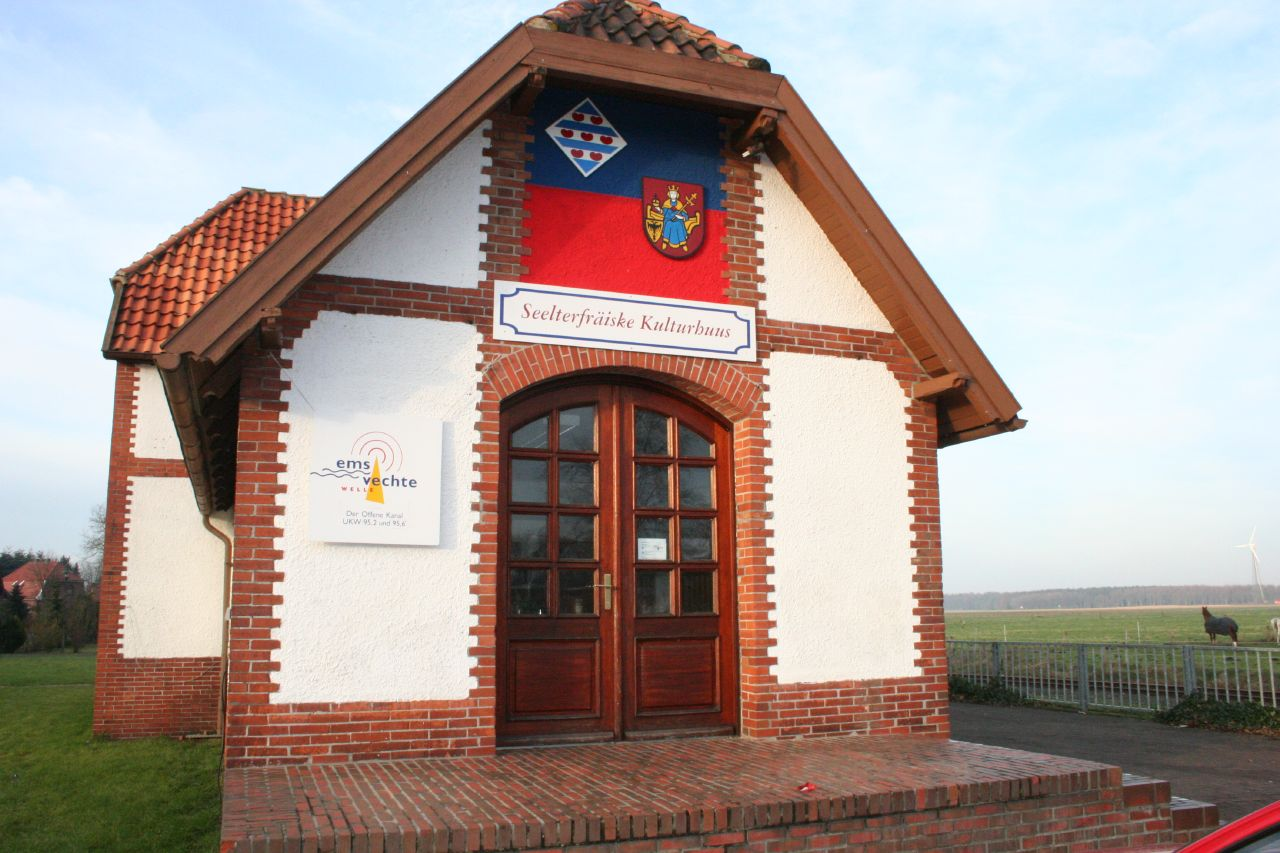
- Former train station

- Coat of arms

- Location of Scharrel within Cloppenburg district
- Interactive map of Scharrel
- Location within Germany Location within Lower Saxony
- Coordinates: 53°4′18″N 7°42′26″E
- Country: Germany
- State: Lower Saxony
- District: Cloppenburg
- Municipality: Saterland

Population (2006)
  - Total: 2,478
- Time zone: UTC+01:00 (CET)
  - Summer (DST): UTC+02:00 (CEST)
- Postal codes: 26683
- Dialling codes: 0 44 92
- Website: www.saterland.de

Scharrel (Saterland Frisian: Skäddel [ˈskɛdəl]) is a village and former municipality in the German state of Lower Saxony. In 1974 the until then independent municipality became part of the newly formed municipality of Saterland in the District of Cloppenburg.

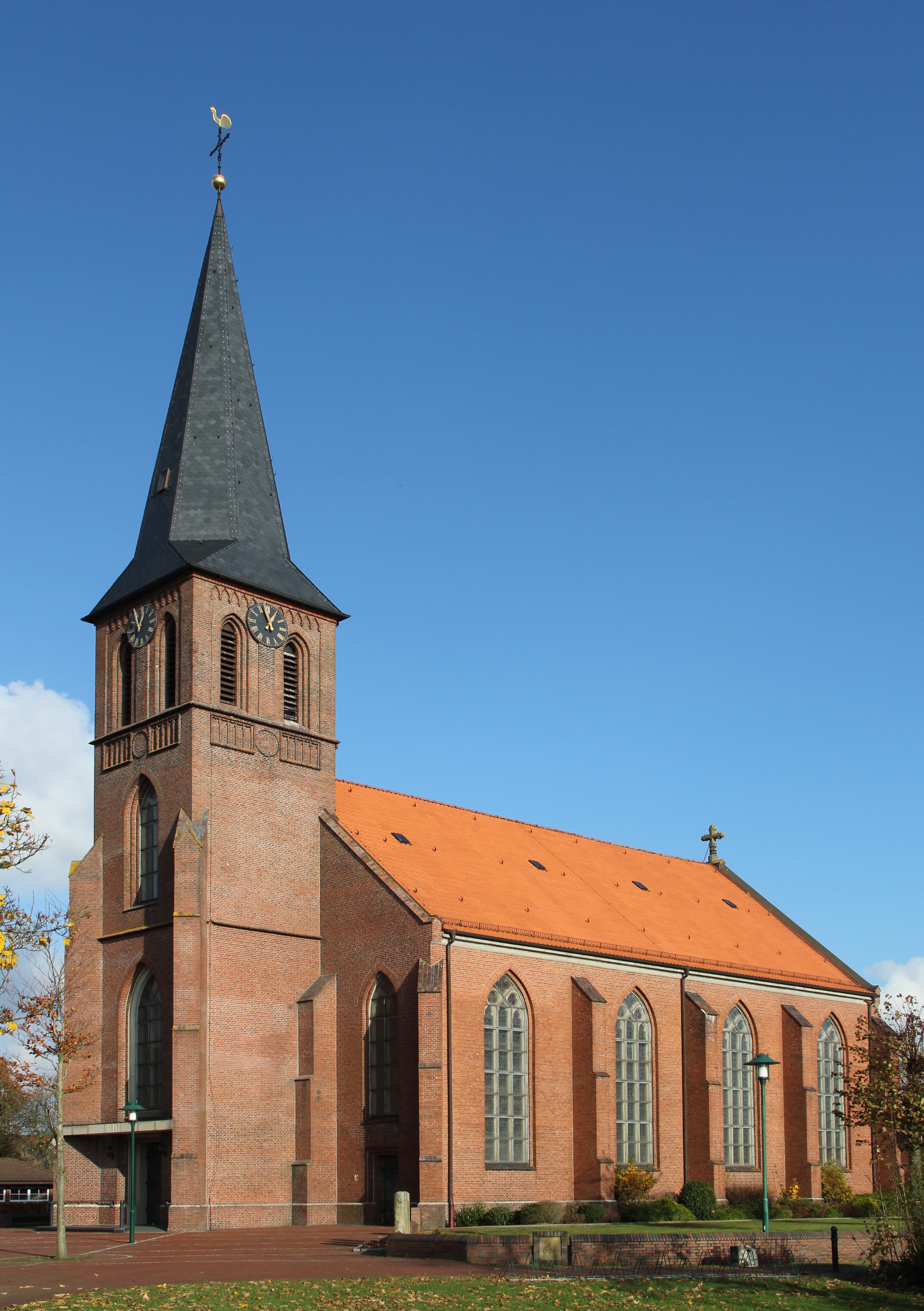
Church of Saints Peter and Paul

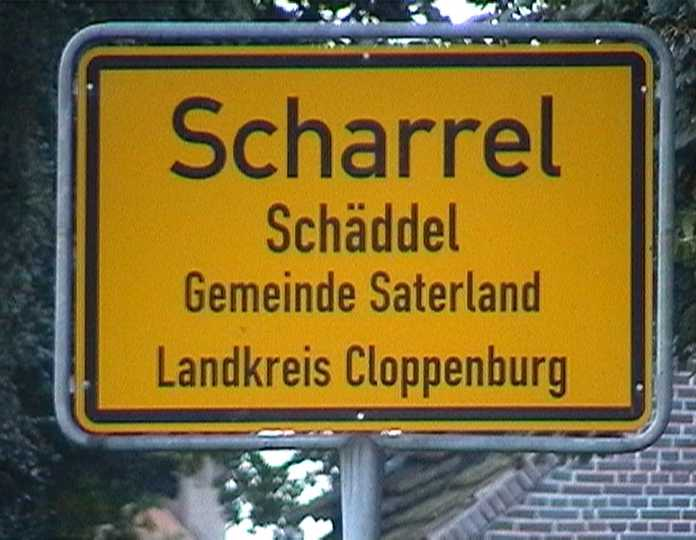
A bilingual sign, with the second line showing the place name in Saterland Frisian
