= Seulingen =

- Municipality
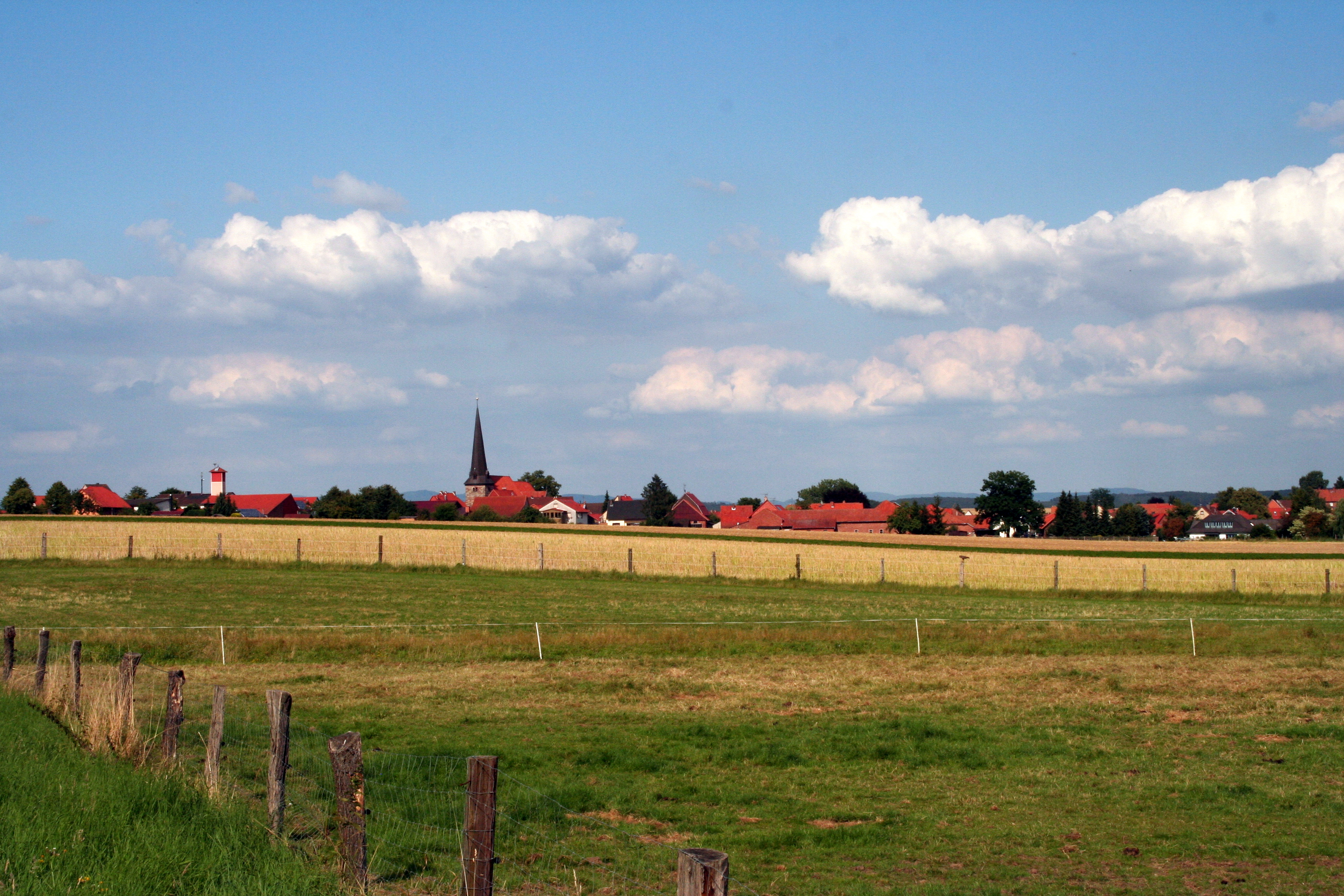

- Coat of arms

- Location of Seulingen within Göttingen district
- Interactive map of Seulingen
- Location within Germany Location within Lower Saxony
- Coordinates: 51°33′N 10°10′E
- Country: Germany
- State: Lower Saxony
- District: Göttingen
- Municipal assoc.: Radolfshausen

Government
  - Mayor: Lars Denecke (CDU)

Area
  - Total: 11.1 km^{2} (4.3 sq mi)
- Elevation: 167 m (548 ft)

Population (2025-12-31)
  - Total: 1,327
  - Density: 120/km^{2} (310/sq mi)
- Time zone: UTC+01:00 (CET)
  - Summer (DST): UTC+02:00 (CEST)
- Postal codes: 37136
- Dialling codes: 05507
- Vehicle registration: GÖ
- Website: www.seulingen.de

Seulingen (German pronunciation: [ˈzɔʏlɪŋən]) is a municipality in the district of Göttingen, in Lower Saxony, Germany. It is part of the Eichsfeld.
