= Westeraccum =

- Village of Dornum
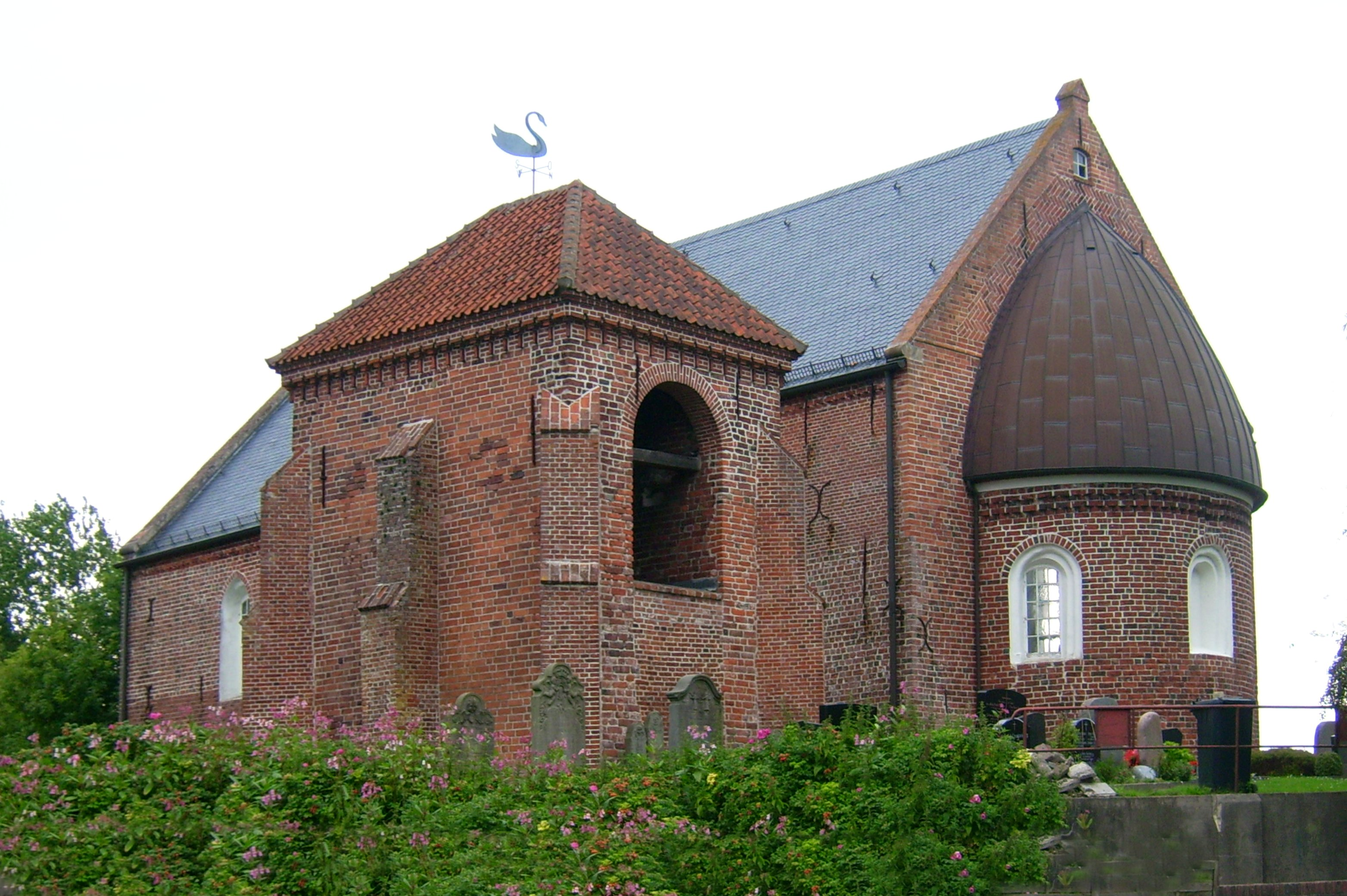
- Westeraccum Church

- Coat of arms
- Interactive map of Westeraccum
- Location within Germany Location within Lower Saxony
- Coordinates: 53.65024°N 7.44476°E
- Country: Germany
- State: Lower Saxony
- District: Aurich
- Municipality: Dornum

Area
  - Metro: 6.3 km^{2} (2.4 sq mi)
- Elevation: 4 m (13 ft)

Population
  - Metro: 366
- Time zone: UTC+01:00 (CET)
  - Summer (DST): UTC+02:00 (CEST)
- Dialling codes: 04933
- Vehicle registration: 26553

Westeraccum is an East Frisian village in Lower Saxony, Germany. It is an Ortsteil of the municipality of Dornum, in the district of Aurich. The village is located just to the northeast of Dornum.

== Etymology ==
Westeraccum was first mentioned in documents in the early 12th century as Westrachem. Later names were Westeragheim, Westerachem (around 1200), and Wester Accum (1684). This is a combination of the first name Acke with -heim ("residential place") and the western direction.
