= Ebergötzen =

- Municipality
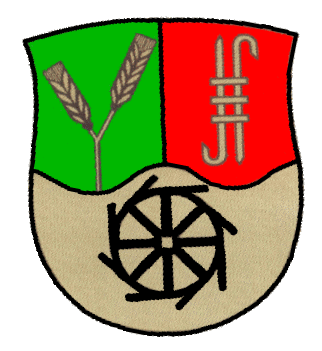
- Flag Coat of arms

- Location of Ebergötzen within Göttingen district
- Interactive map of Ebergötzen
- Location within Germany Location within Lower Saxony
- Coordinates: 51°34′22″N 10°06′28″E
- Country: Germany
- State: Lower Saxony
- District: Göttingen
- Municipal assoc.: Radolfshausen

Government
  - Mayor: Jan Bährens (SPD)

Area
  - Total: 19.7 km^{2} (7.6 sq mi)
- Elevation: 190 m (620 ft)

Population (2025-12-31)
  - Total: 1,973
  - Density: 100/km^{2} (259/sq mi)
- Time zone: UTC+01:00 (CET)
  - Summer (DST): UTC+02:00 (CEST)
- Postal codes: 37136
- Dialling codes: 05507
- Vehicle registration: GÖ
- Website: www.ebergoetzen.de

Ebergötzen is a village in the District of Göttingen, Lower Saxony, Germany. It is 15 km from Göttingen and belongs to the Samtgemeinde Radolfshausen. As of December 2020, Ebergötzen has 1,927 inhabitants.

Ebergötzen is known as the place where Wilhelm Busch, considered by many the "Father of the Comic Strip" due to his work on the Max und Moritz stories, spent part of his childhood. He lived there from 1841 to 1846, staying with his uncle Georg Kleine, the pastor of Ebergötzen. He had a friendship with the miller's son and neighbour, Erich Bachmann, and it is speculated that the boys' experiences are portrayed in Max and Moritz.

Ebergötzen is home to two tourist attractions, the Wilhelm Busch Museum and the European Bread Museum.
