= Münkeboe =

- Village of Südbrookmerland
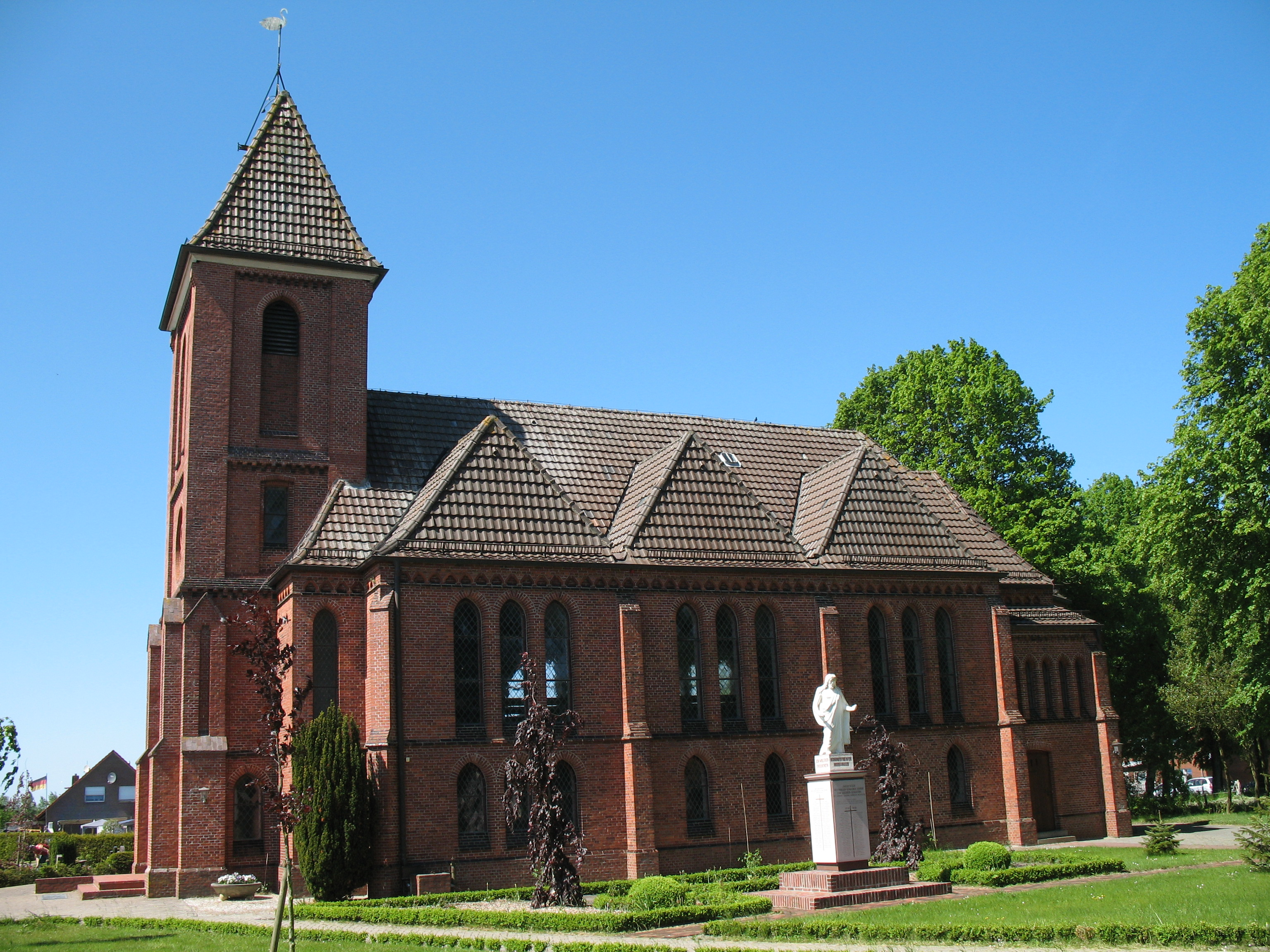
- Church of the Good Shepherd

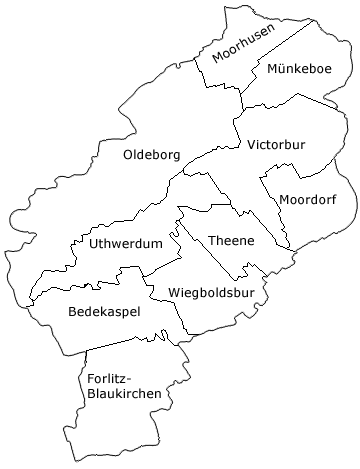
- Ortsteile of Südbrookmerland
- Interactive map of Münkeboe
- Location within Germany Location within Lower Saxony
- Coordinates: 53.51629°N 7.37676°E
- Country: Germany
- State: Lower Saxony
- District: Aurich
- Municipality: Südbrookmerland
- Elevation: 4 m (13 ft)

Population
  - Metro: 1,713
- Time zone: UTC+01:00 (CET)
  - Summer (DST): UTC+02:00 (CEST)
- Dialling codes: 04942
- Vehicle registration: 26624

Münkeboe is an East Frisian village in Lower Saxony, Germany. It is an Ortsteil of the municipality of Südbrookmerland, in the district of Aurich. It is located southwest of the Ewiges Meer and approximately 8 kilometers northwest of Aurich.

Münkeboe was an independent municipality until it was incorporated into the municipality of Südbrookmerland on 1 July 1972.

The village has a museum, Dörpmuseum Münkeboe, exhibiting old handicrafts and tools used by the rural population. The museum includes a functioning windmill, a wheelwright's shop, a blacksmith's shop, a carpenter's shop, a pottery, a bakery, a classroom, and a grocery store.

== Etymology ==
Münkeboe is a moor settlement established in 1764 and first mentioned in the Engerhafe church register in 1771. The place was first recorded in 1787 as Münkeboo. The current spelling has been documented since 1825. The name of the settlement means "monk's hut", which is based on the fact that, according to reports, the first colonists found remains of walls in the ground here, which could indicate a property of a former monastery.

== Gallery ==
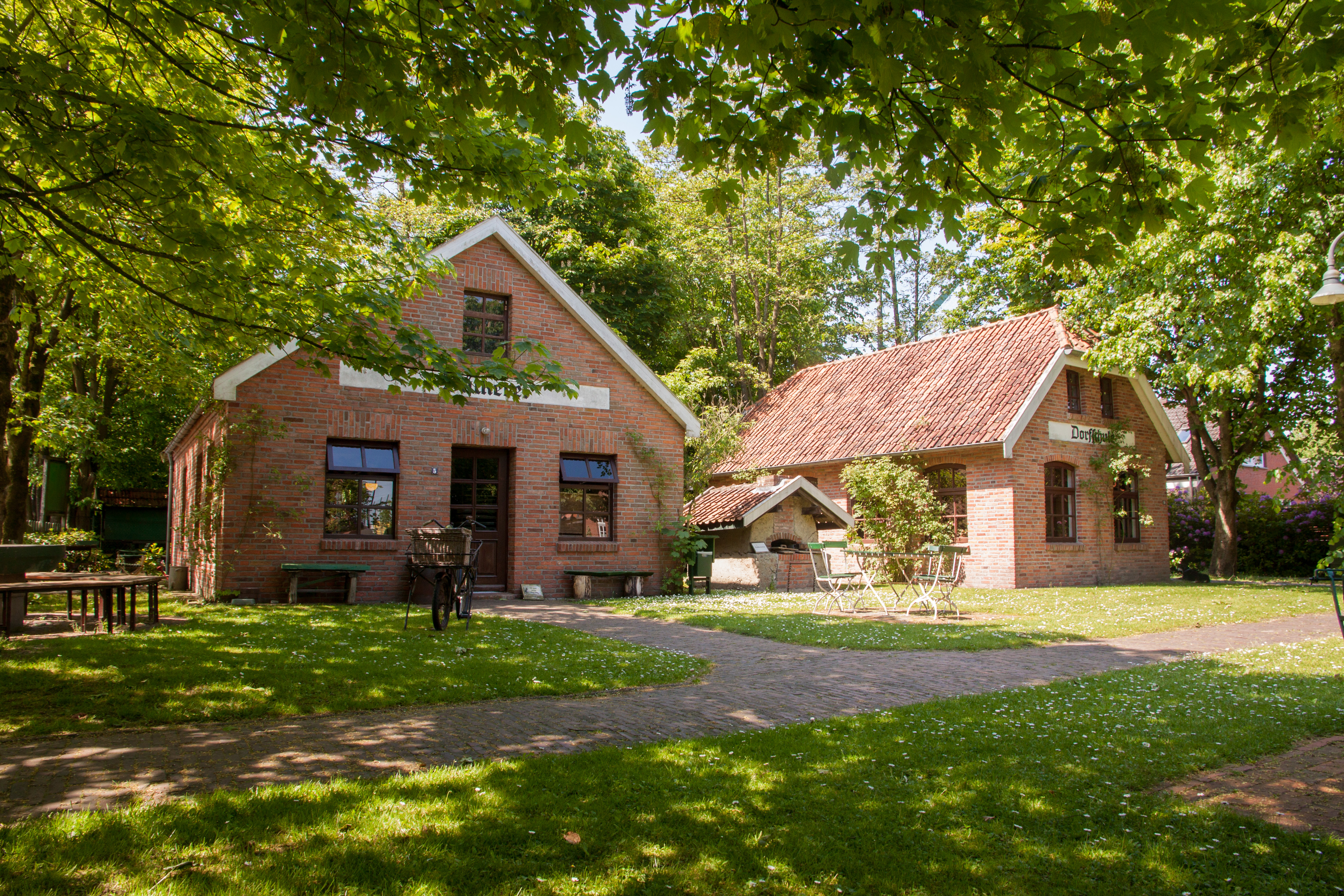
Dörpmuseum Münkeboe

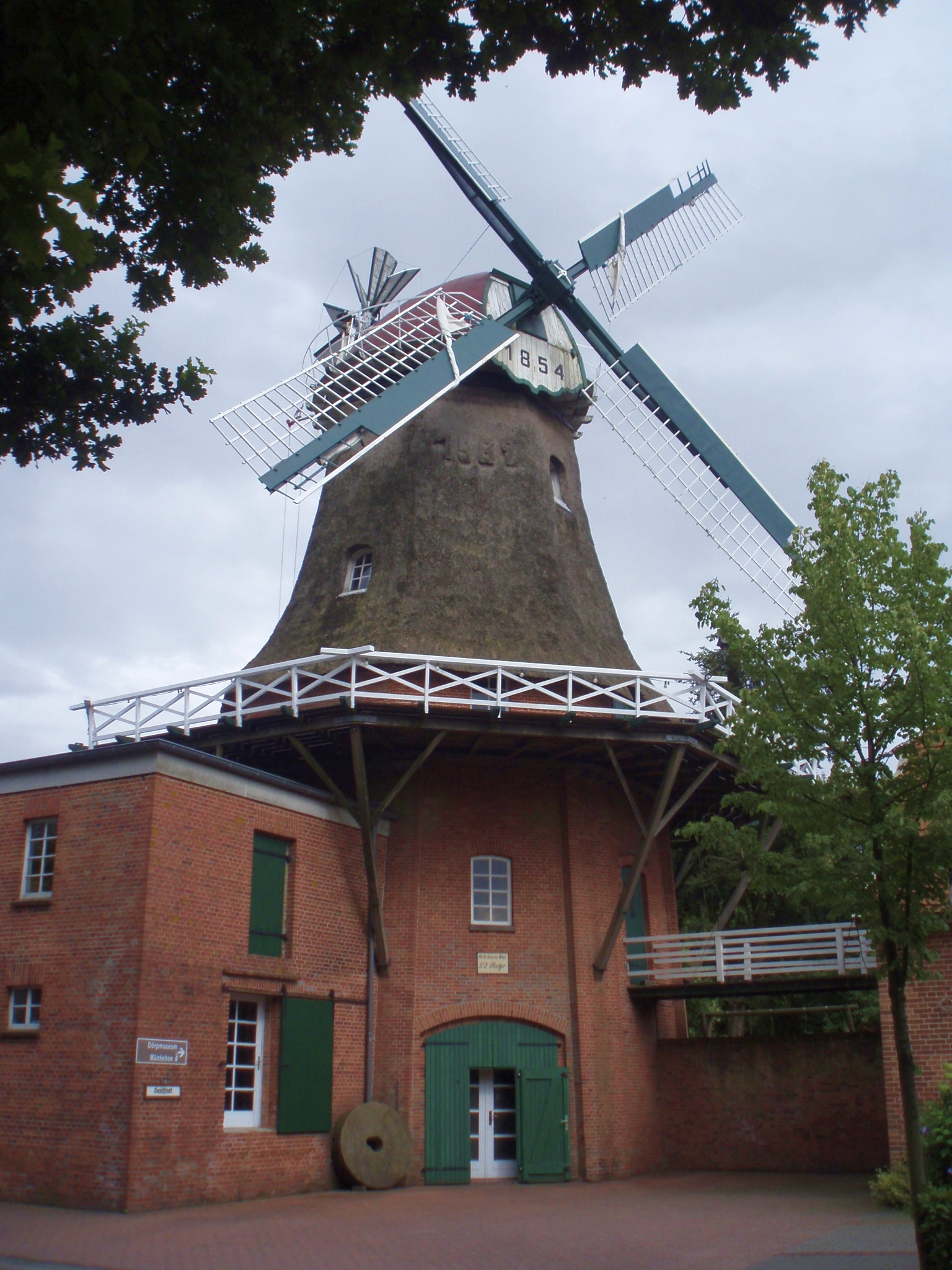
Smock mill

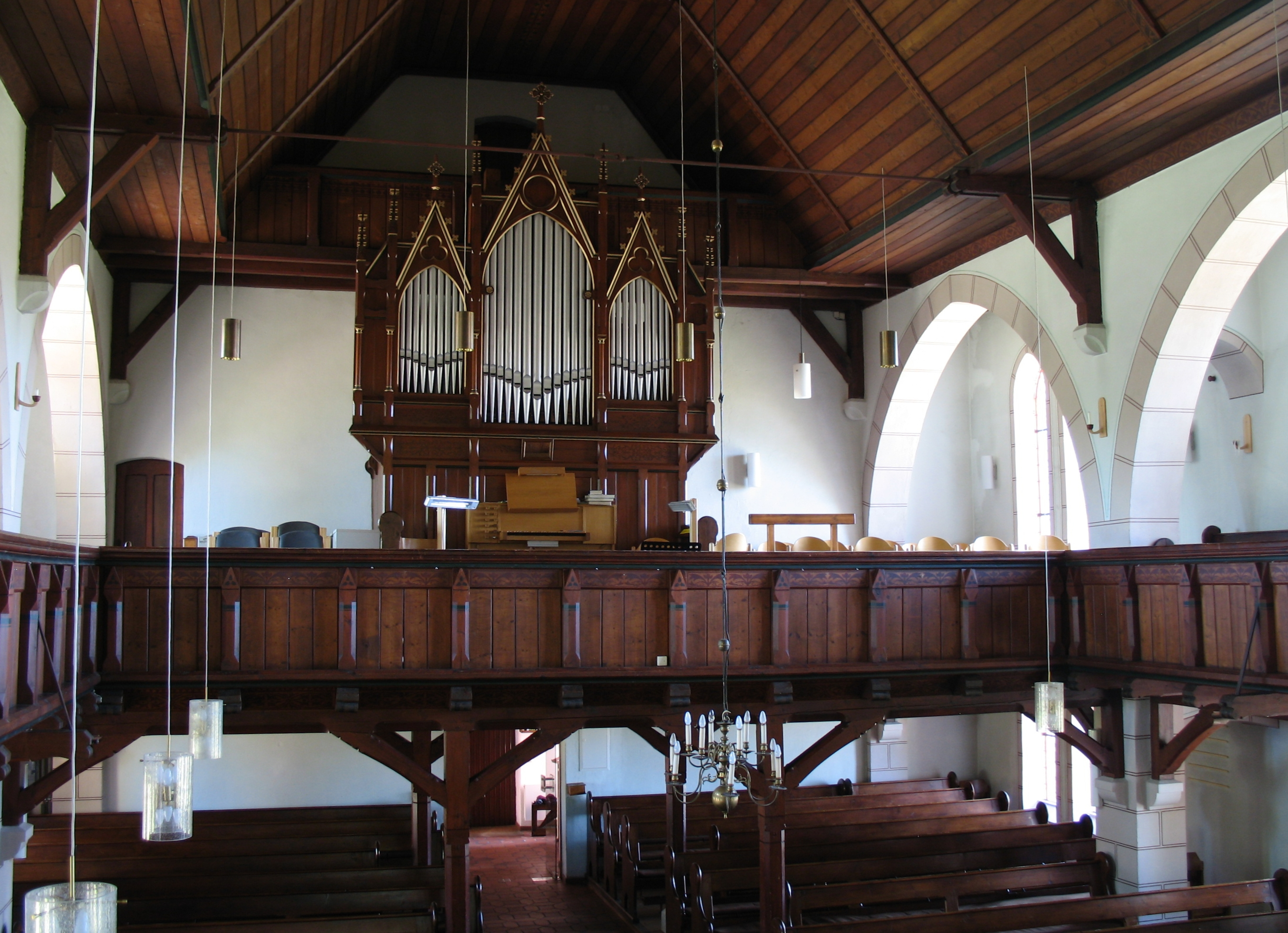
Interior of the Church of the Good Shepherd
