= International Wind- and Watermill Museum =

Open-air museum in Germany

Coordinates: 52°29′37″N 10°32′52″E

The International Wind- and Watermill Museum (German: Internationales Wind- und Wassermühlen-Museum), at Gifhorn in the German state of Lower Saxony, is the only one of its kind in Europe. On the museum's open-air site, which covers an area of around 16 hectares (40 acres), there are currently 16 mills from 12 different countries (as of 2009). The mills are either original or faithful reproductions and are set in landscapes typical of their origins. Right across the site are historic artefacts associated with mills and the milling industry. The museum site is easily accessed by road; nearby is the intersection between the B 4 and B 188 federal highways. The museum is station 65 on the Lower Saxon Mill Road.

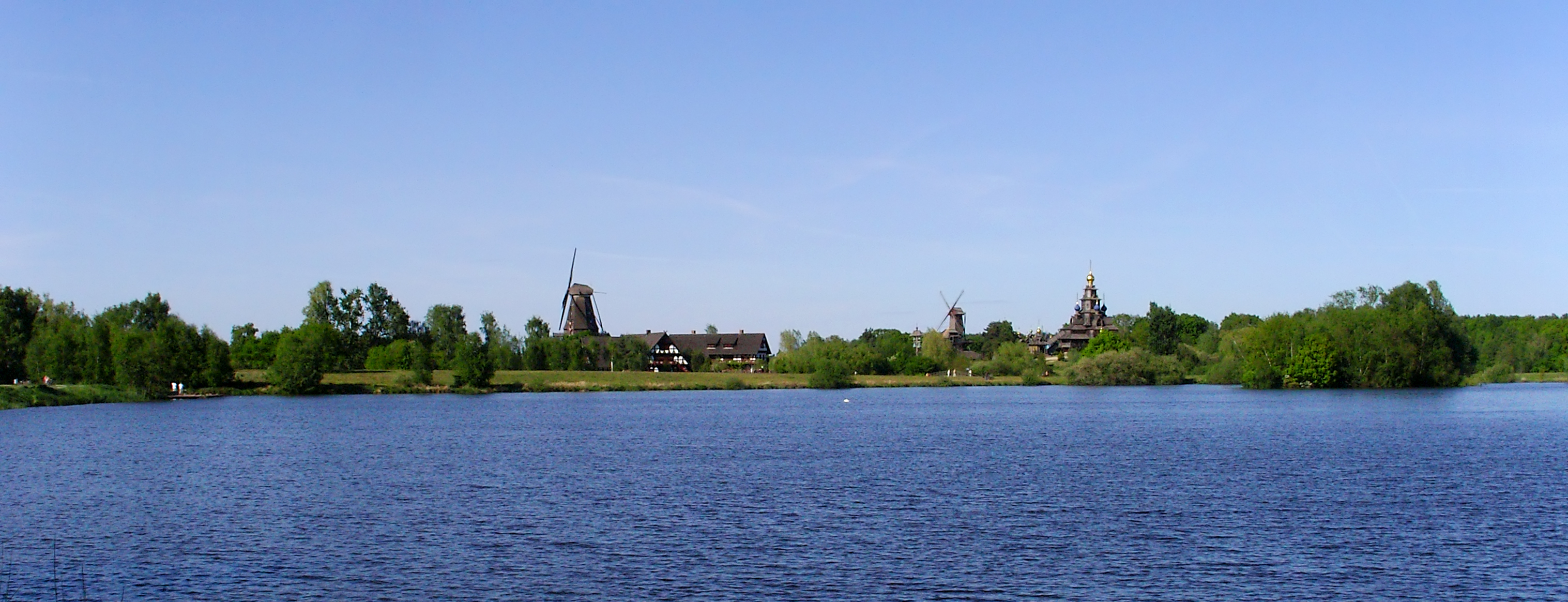
View across the millpond to the museum site

Mühlenmuseum Gifhorn

== Museum origins ==
The history of the mill museum is closely linked to its founder and owner, Horst Wrobel. In 1965 he discovered an old post mill that was still working, on the Elm ridge at Abbenrode during an outing. Horst Wrobel made a replica of the mill at a scale of 1:25 and then collected all kinds of material about windmills and watermills. In 1974 he established a private museum in Suhlendorf with the first models of mills that he had built. In order to create a larger scale model, he first made overtures in 1977 to the district of Gifhorn, who then actively supported the project. In the same year the two parties concluded a leasehold agreement for the land of the future museum site.

== From 1980 to today ==
The mill museum opened its doors in 1980 following two years of extensive field engineering by the Aller-Ohre-Verband. With the aid of bulldozers and flushing dredgers, the terrain was landscaped and numerous ditches and ponds created, as well as a 5 hectare mill lake. The lake also acts as a retention basin to prevent flooding to and to regulate the flow of the river Ise. The first structures to be built were the exhibition hall and three mills (The Kellerholländer, the post mill (Bockwindmühle) and the Tyrolean watermill).

== Mill models ==
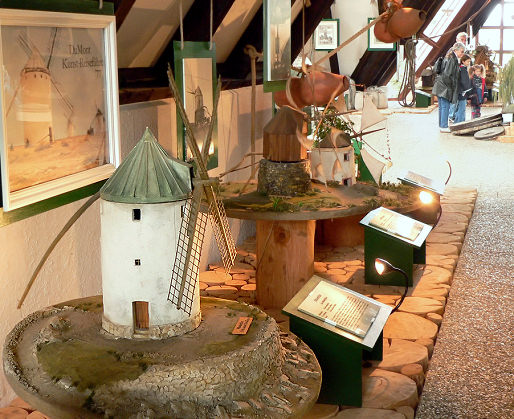
Exhibition hall with mill models

The heart of the museum site is the 800 m^{2} exhibition hall housing objects from mills and the milling industry. In addition, there are 49 miniature model windmills and watermills - detailed and accurate scale models of the originals - from 20 countries on display. They provide information about those processes that man made use of in employing wind and water power to carry out heavy work before the discovery of the steam engine.

Examples of the mill models:

- Abbenrode mill near Helmstedt
- Wendhausen five-sailed mill near Lehre
- British mill near Framlingham in Suffolk
- Paltrock mill from Schönau
- Dutch tilting mill (Wippmühle) from Niewersluis
- Egyptian mill near Moos
- Finnish circular-sailed mill (Kreisflügelmühle) in Uusikaupunki
- Snuff mill in Rotterdam
- Sawmill in Koog aan de Zaan
- Rembrandt post mill in Leiden
- The Bremen mill, Am Wall
- Irish mill from County Wexford
- Persian oil mill in Isfahan
- Windmill on Paris's Montmartre
- Dutch four-gear (Viergang) mill near Zevenhuizen
- Keukenhof mill in south Holland
- Persian corn mill from the province of Karasan
- Don Quixote's windmill from La Mancha
- Mostert mill near Cape Town
- Post mill (Pfahlmühle) from Bessarabia

== The Dorfplatz ==
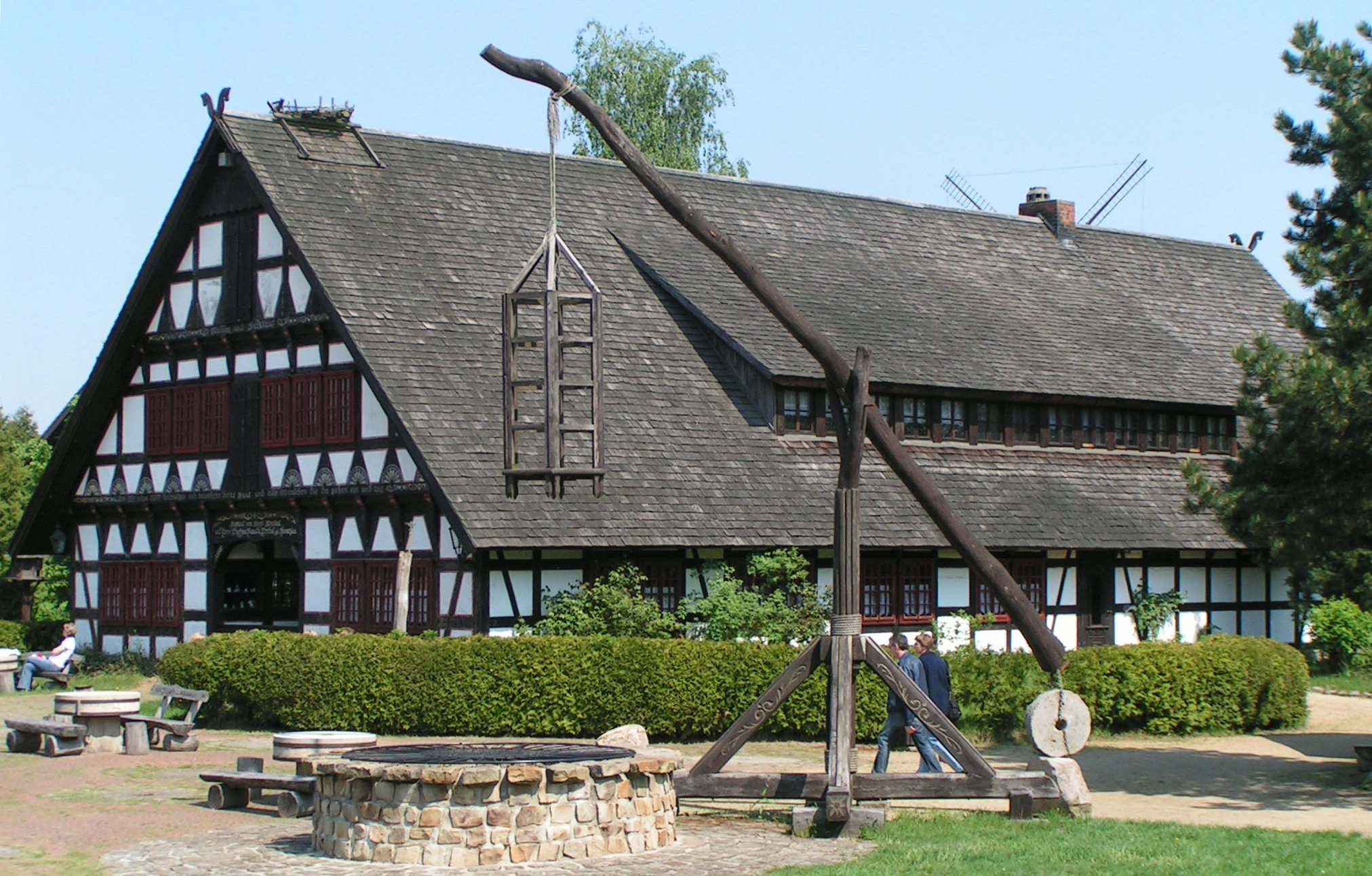
The Dorfplatz with its baker's ducking stool (Bäckertaufe)

The centrepiece of the open-air museum is the village square or Dorfplatz with a collection of three timber-framed houses, which are arranged in the form of a Rundling village:

- The Backhaus, a baker's or miller's house, was built in 1983 as a four-post timber-framed house (of the Lower Saxon house type) and has room for around 250 guests.
- The Brothaus or bakery from 1985 is a replica of a bakehouse (Backhaus) on a traditional farm near Gifhorn. Here bread and cakes based on traditional recipes are baked in two, wood-fired, stone, baking ovens and sold to the museum's visitors.
- The Trachtenhaus appeared in 1990 as a timber-framed building and, with its old bakery (Backstube) and restaurant, has seating for around 500 guests.

On the square is the "international mill tree". This is a pole, about 30 metres high, on which the state coats-of-arms of all the countries represented by the mills in the museum may be found, as well as wood carvings with milling motifs.

== Mills ==
=== Sanssouci, a German smock mill ===
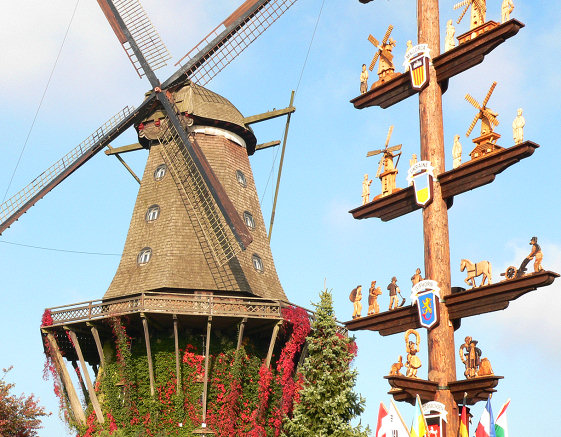
The Sanssouci mill and mill tree

A smock mill has stood on the Dorfplatz since 1984 which is based on the historic mill near the castle of Sanssouci in Potsdam. The 40 metre high original was built in 1788, burnt down in 1945 during the final clashes of the Second World War and was rebuilt in Potsdam in 1993. The mill near the royal residence became famous through a legend that its clattering disturbed Frederick the Great. When the king threatened it with compulsory purchase, the miller was referred to the Kammergericht, or Supreme Court, in Berlin. The German name for this type of mill, Galerieholländer ("Dutch gallery mill"), refers to the circular gallery on the fourth story of the mill. The mill thus has enormous dimensions. Inside the Sansoucci mill at Gifhorn, the story of the mill museum is presented.

=== Viktoria, a German post mill ===
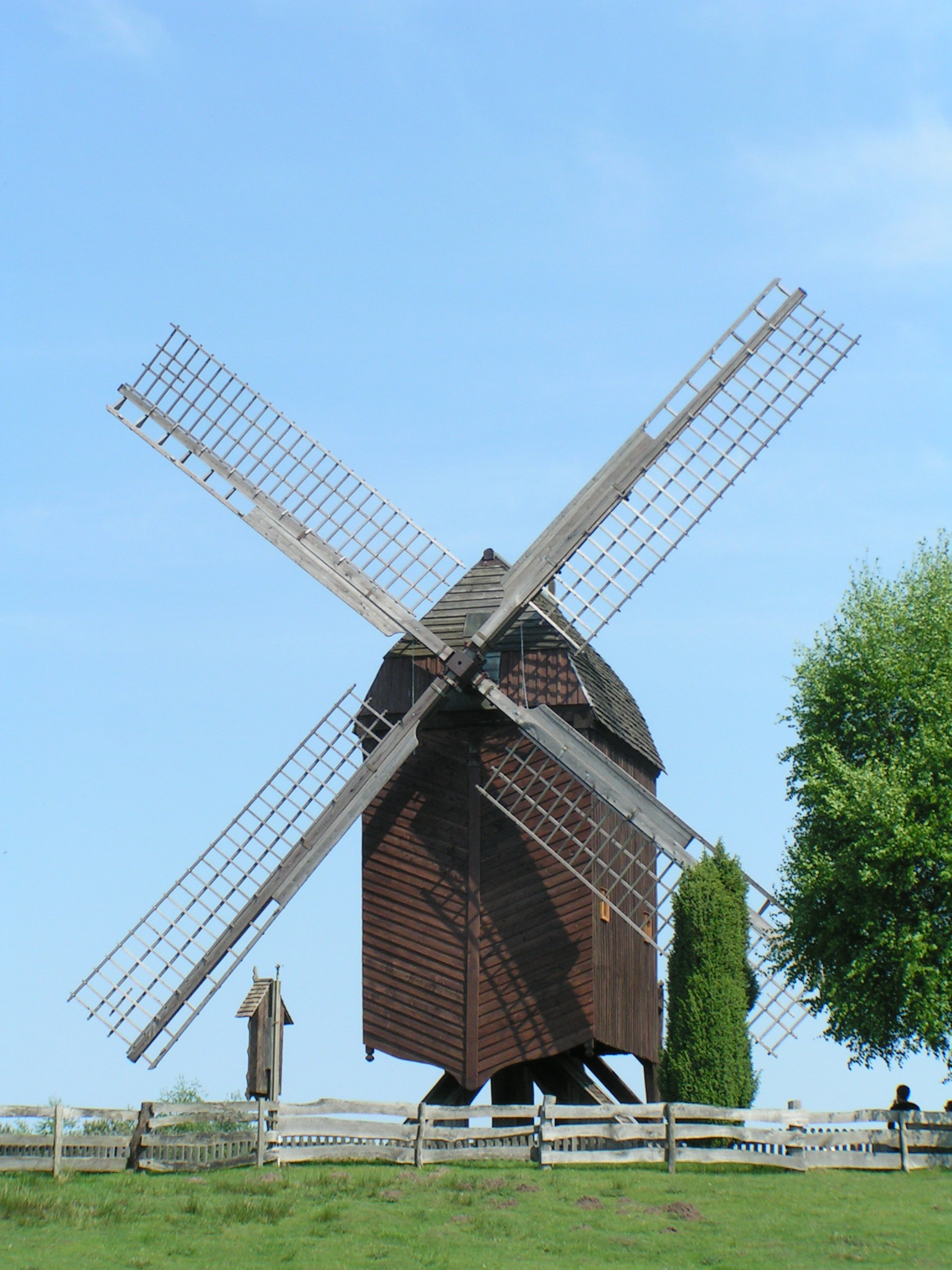
The Viktoria post mill

The Viktoria post mill comes from the nearby village of Osloß and may therefore be considered typical of the local area. In 1882 it was erected there by a miller who had bought the mill in Neuhaldensleben district. Its original year of construction is given on the mill as 1816. It closed in 1940 and fell into disrepair. The district of Gifhorn bought the dilapidated mill in 1977 and gave it into the charge of the museum owner, Horst Wrobel. It was restored with the help of donations and, in 1980, was rebuilt at the mill museum in working order.

The German term for this type of mill, Bockwindmühle, refers to a mill in which the entire millhouse, stands on, or, more precisely, hangs from, a trestle or Bock. The millhouse along with its equipment was turned into the wind before work was begun. According to the Prussian Civil Code of 1794, a Bockwindmühle was not counted as a building in its narrowest sense, but as a machine. That meant that the owner did not have to pay house interest tax (Hauszinssteuer) for his workplace.

=== Immanuel, a German tower mill ===
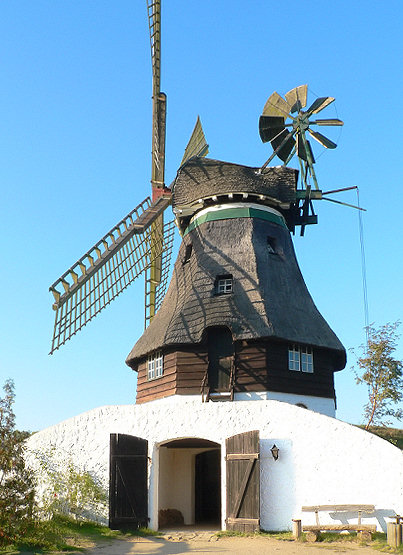
The Immanuel mill

This tower mill comes from Westdorf in the district of Dithmarschen, where it was built in 1848 under the name Immanuel. It is one of the original three mills that was established at the museum. It is described in German as a Bergholländer ("Dutch hill mill") or Kellerholländer ("Dutch cellar mill"). These terms indicated that, in the former case that the mill was built on a small hill, and in the latter, that it had a cellar into which the horses and carts could be driven. During the course of its history the mill was modified many times and evolved into a highly technical mill including, inter alia an automatic wind rose. The sails could be adjusted to the wind speed. In 1969 the last miller offered to donate the mill in a newspaper advert on the condition that it was rebuilt. The newspaper publisher, Axel Springer, acquired the mill and had it restored. Later he donated it to the mill museum, where it was rebuilt in 1979.

=== Tyrolian watermill ===
The roughly 300-year-old watermill from Iselsberg-Stronach near Lienz in the Tyrol is also one of the first three mills of the museum and was built here in 1979. It used to stand by a mountain stream in the Lesachtal valley in East Tyrol and is driven on the museum site by a pond. The mill, made of solid larch logs, has two overshot water wheels, that drive two milling gears.

=== Rossmühle, a German horse mill ===
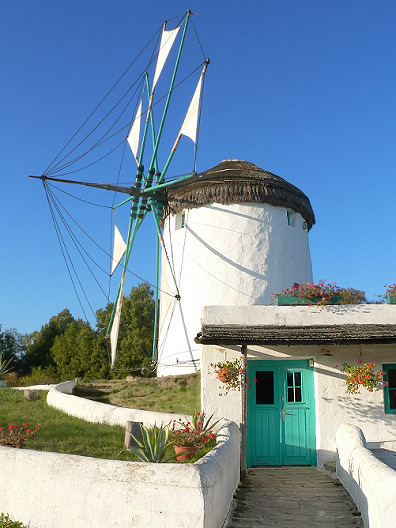
The Mykonos mill

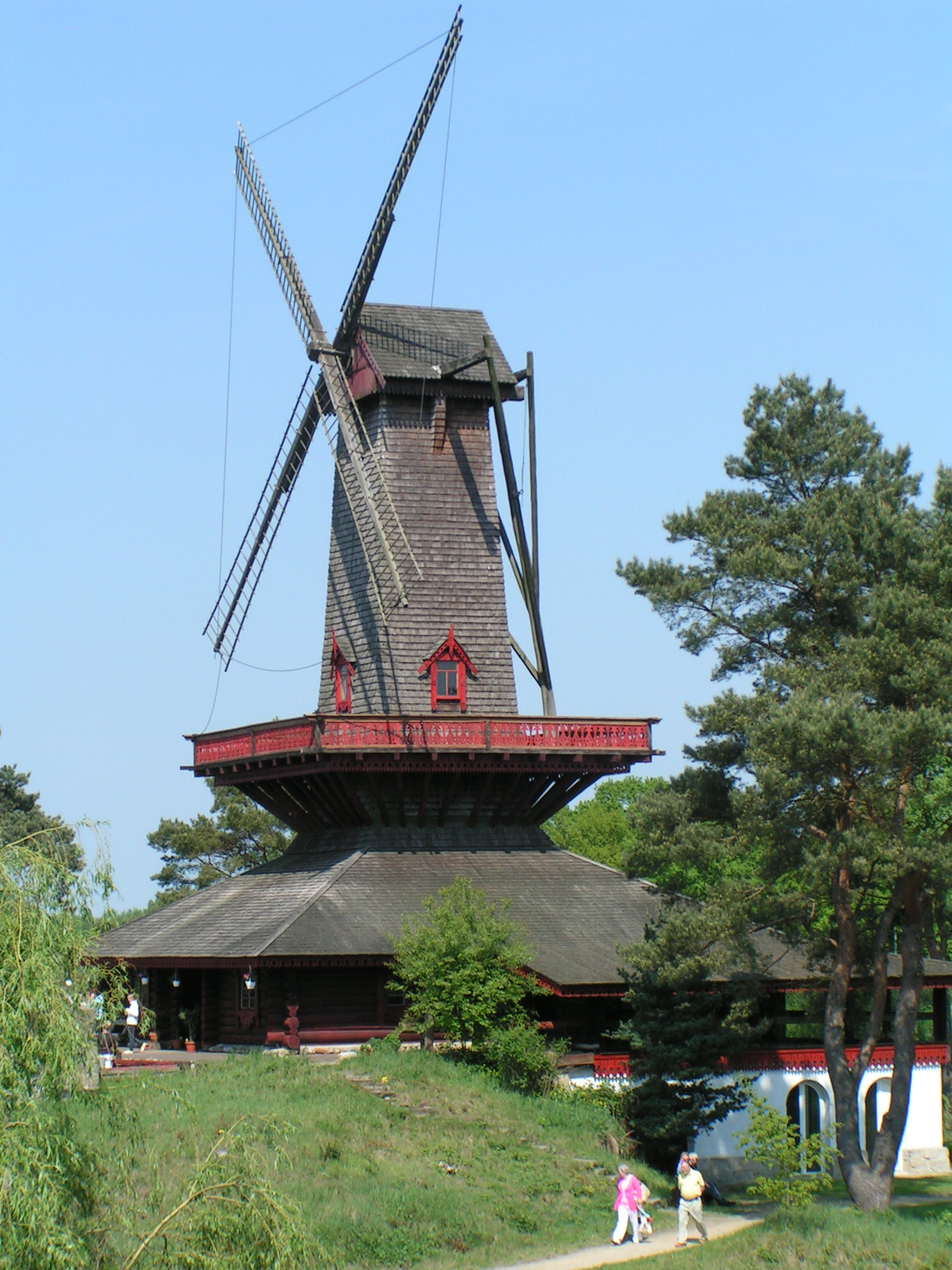
The Natascha, a Ukrainian windmill

The Rossmühle is probably the largest horse mill (Pferdemühle) in Germany and comes from Hüllhorst-Oberbauerschaft in the district of Minden-Lübbecke. The original was built in 1797 and this replica erected in 1982. It is an octagonal timber-framed building. In the interior, horses walked around in a circle turning a wooden cogwheel with a power of one horsepower (PS) each. The cogwheel, with its 320 teeth and diameter of 32 metres, is the largest known of its type. It drove a stamping mill, used in the production of flax, and a corn mill.

=== Mykonos, a Greek mill ===
When the museum was expanded in 1987 a replica of a Greek windmill on the Cycladic island of Mykonos was constructed on an artificial island on the site. It is a white tower mill with a pointed roof and twelve sails.

=== Natalka, a Ukrainian windmill ===
The replica of a Ukrainian windmill, the Natalka, was opened in 1988 in the presence of the consul general of the Soviet Union, an occasion intended to foster positive contacts with the former Communist state. The mill's prototype stands in Gifhorn's partner town of Korsun-Shevchenkivskyi in Ukraine near Kyiv, where it acts as a restaurant today under the name of Vitrjak ("windmill"). The mill has a base made of solid pine and spruce logs built in log cabin style. The long, narrow tower only houses a driveshaft. Like many Ukrainian structures, the windows, doors and exposed brickwork are richly decorated.

=== Hungarian Danube ship mill ===
In 1989, after taking just one year to build, the Danube ship mill, Julischka, went into operation on the Ise. It consists of two wooden boats between which a paddle wheel turns. In the larger hull is the mill gear and the miller's room. The smaller hull supports the axle of the paddle wheel which rotates in the river. The mill was built by:

- Shipyard workers from the shipyard in the Hungarian town of Mohács
- Museum experts from the open-air museum at Szentendre near Budapest
- Carpenters from Lower Saxony
- A mill construction firm from Belgium

With this type of mill the owner is both miller and ship's captain. He can search for the best water flow in the river. The ship mill has the disadvantage of being an obstacle to shipping so that, in the 19th century, regulations had to be introduced. In 1861 the construction of ship mills was banned on the Rhine River, consequently the last mill of this type disappeared in 1926. Such river mills have completely disappeared from today's rural scene, because they only have a life of about 50 years. They had been invented by as early as 536 during the siege of Rome by the Ostrogoths. Their heyday was during the 16th and 17th centuries.

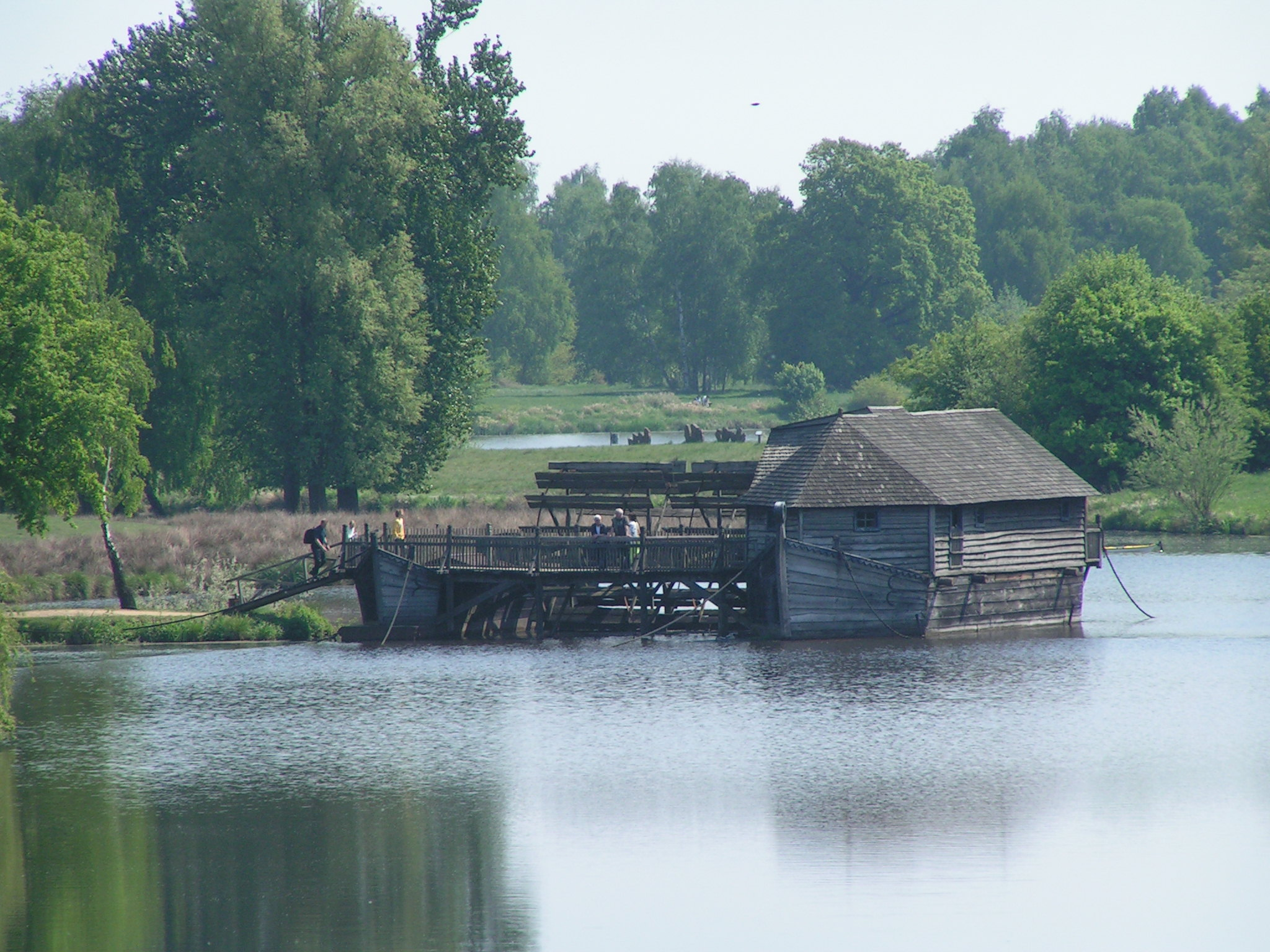
Danube ship mill

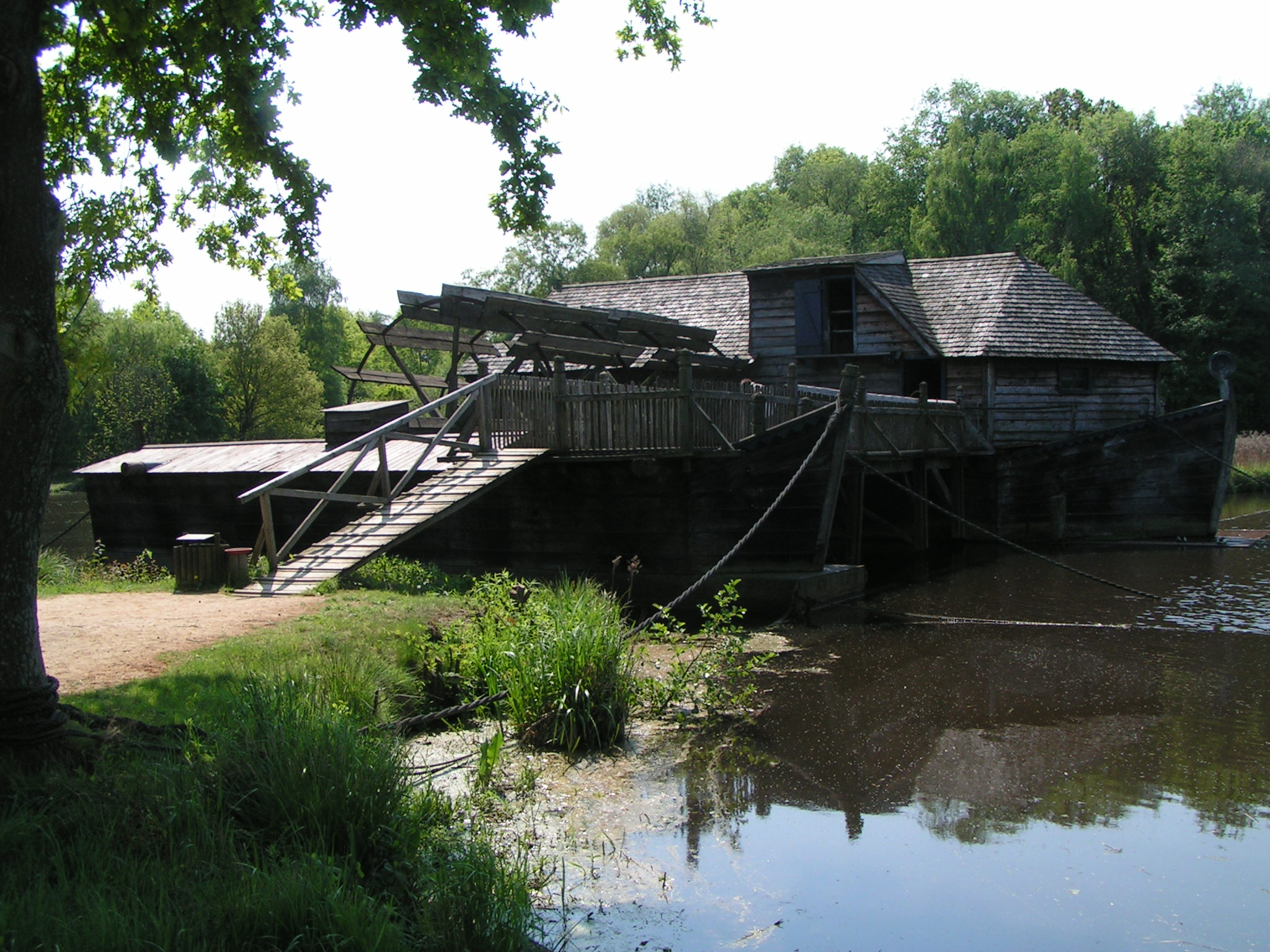
Danube ship mill

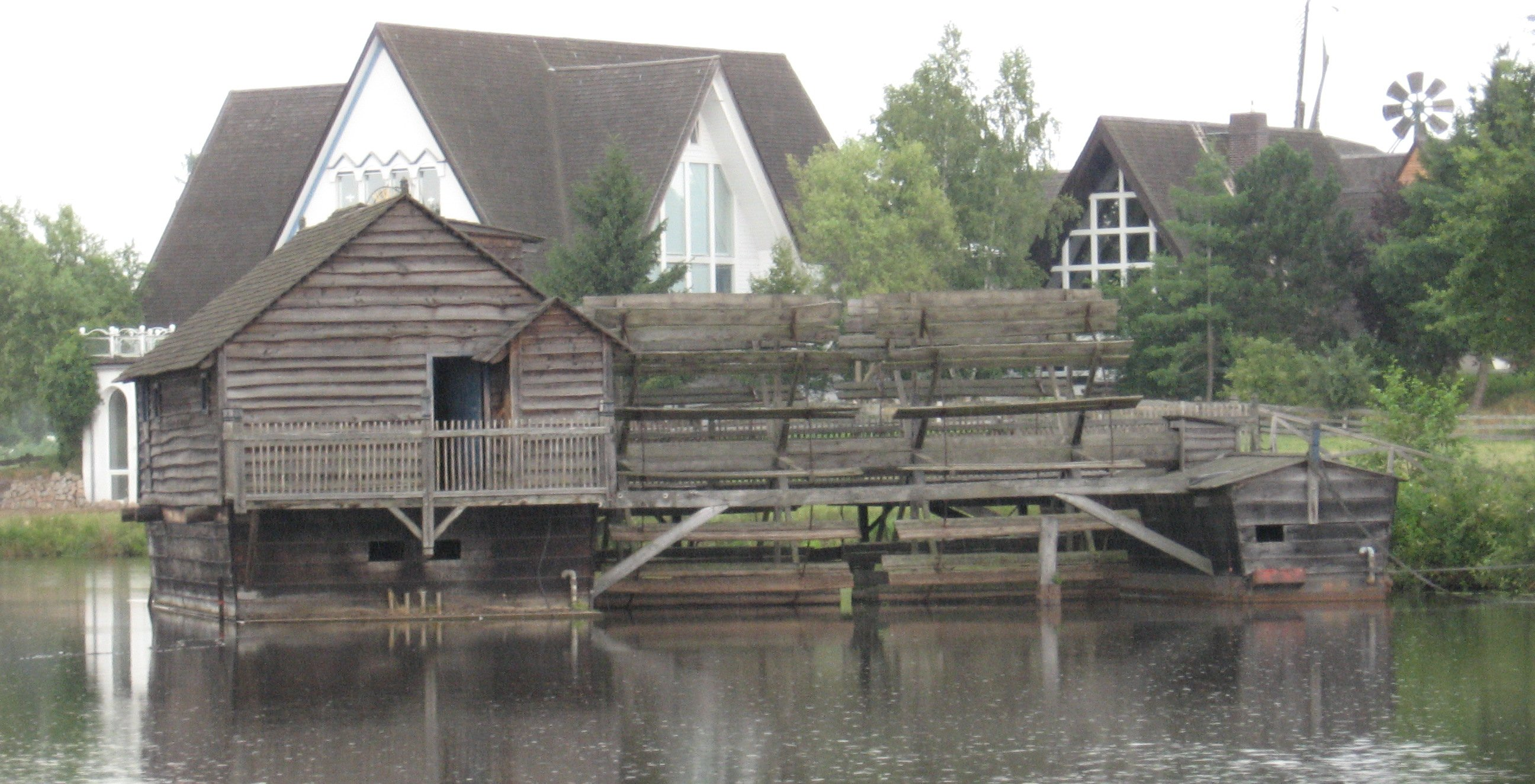
Danube ship mill

=== Algarve, a Portuguese windmill ===
This replica mill was erected in 1993 next to the Greek mill and comes from Torres Vedras in central Portugal. It also represents the type of mill found on the Algarve coast. The mill, with its four triangular sails, is typical of Portugal and the Mediterranean area.

=== Balearic windmill from Mallorca ===
The corn mill, Moli de Tramuntana was built in 2000 based on the mills near Palma de Mallorca on the Balearic island of Mallorca. Many such mills would be built in a row on elevated land. The round tower stands on a rectangular base, which was also the residence for the miller's family. The mill has six fabric covered sails with a diameter of about 20 metres. In the museum mill there is an exhibition in the basement of the Mills of Mallorca, Yesterday and Today. Representatives of the society, "Friends of the Mills of Mallorca" came to the foundation stone ceremony.

=== Russian post mill ===
This Russian farmer's windmill was built in Russia in 2001 and transported to Gifhorn by lorry. It is a replica of a typical Russian agricultural mill from the north Russian region around Arkhangelsk. The mill is a present from the Andrej Rublijow Foundation from Moscow, which is dedicated to the conservation of Russian architectural heritage.

=== Provençal windmill from France ===
The Alphonse Daudet windmill was built in 2002 (photo: see above) as a replica. The prototype was built in 1813 in Fontvieille near Arles in French Provence. The poet, Alphonse Daudet (1840–1897), immortalised it in the 19th century in his book, Letters From my Mill. In 1935 the "Society of the Friends of Alphonse Daudet" dedicated the mill as a museum and, in 1936, it appeared on a French postage stamp. This type of mill first appeared in the 12th century and is one of the oldest in France.

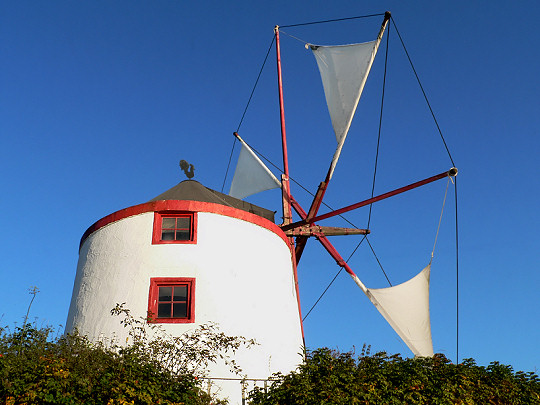
Portuguese windmill: Algarve

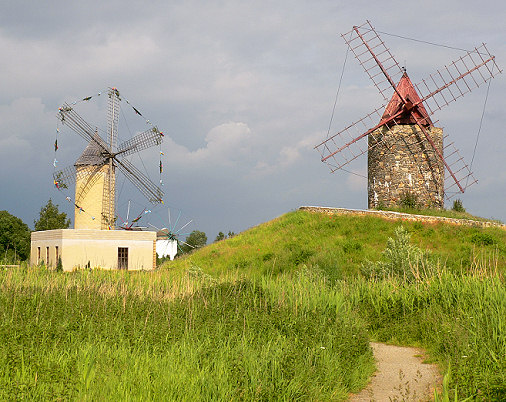
Left: Corn mill from Mallorca, right: mill from Provence

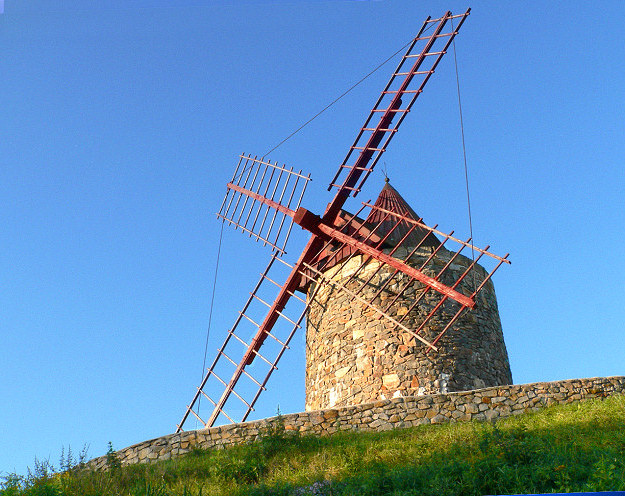
Provençal windmill

=== Korean watermill ===
This Korean stamp mill appeared in 2003, the first Asian mill on the museum site. It is an overshot mill from a hill region in the Gangwon Province in South Korea. Hill farmers used this type of farm in the 19th century to grind corn. The Gifhorn mill was built in Korea using old traditional methods and Korean firs and birches and transported by ship to Germany, where three specialists from Korea erected it. It is a present from the Korean governor in whose district this type of mill was used.

=== Taiwanese water treadmill ===
From the island of Taiwan comes this water treadmill, which was used to scoop water up and raise it to a higher level. This is the only mill of this type that exists in that country. This replica of a historic water treadmill is a loan from the vocational schools in the district of Gifhorn that have a school partnership arrangement with Taiwan.

=== Serbian watermill ===
The old Serbian mill, mudra Milica, is the latest and 15th mill in the mill museum. It was added in May 2005 and is around 100 years old. It is a vortex or horizontal water wheel (Löffelradmühle) from western Serbia. This type of mill was the forerunner of the Pelton turbine. Its bucket water wheels were especially useful where there were small amounts of water and steep gradients. This type was used especially in mountain regions, like the Alps, the Pyrenees and the Carpathians. The mill was a present from the Serbian-Orthodox bishop Lavrentije of the diocese of Šabac-Valjevo to celebrate the 25th anniversary of the mill museum.

=== Lady Devorgilla, a Scottish windmill ===
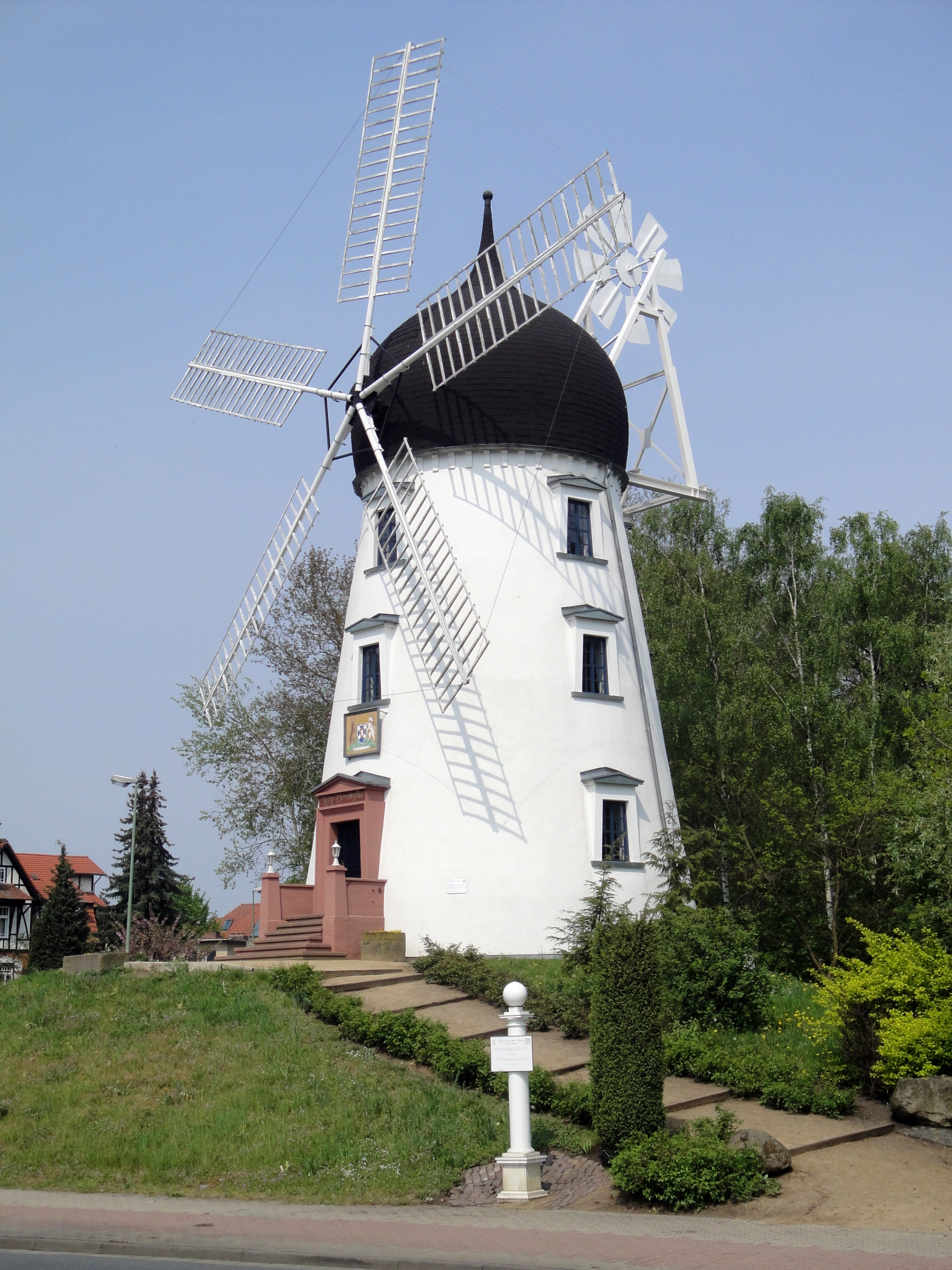
Lady Devorgilla in Gifhorn

The Lady Devorgilla mill is not located on the museum site itself, but within eyeshot of the museum on a lake on the edge of the town centre. It acts as a romantic backdrop for marriages and belongs to the town of Gifhorn. It is a replica of a Scottish windmill on Corbey Hill and dates to 1790. The original stands in Gifhorn's Scottish partner town of Dumfries.

== The Russian stave church ==
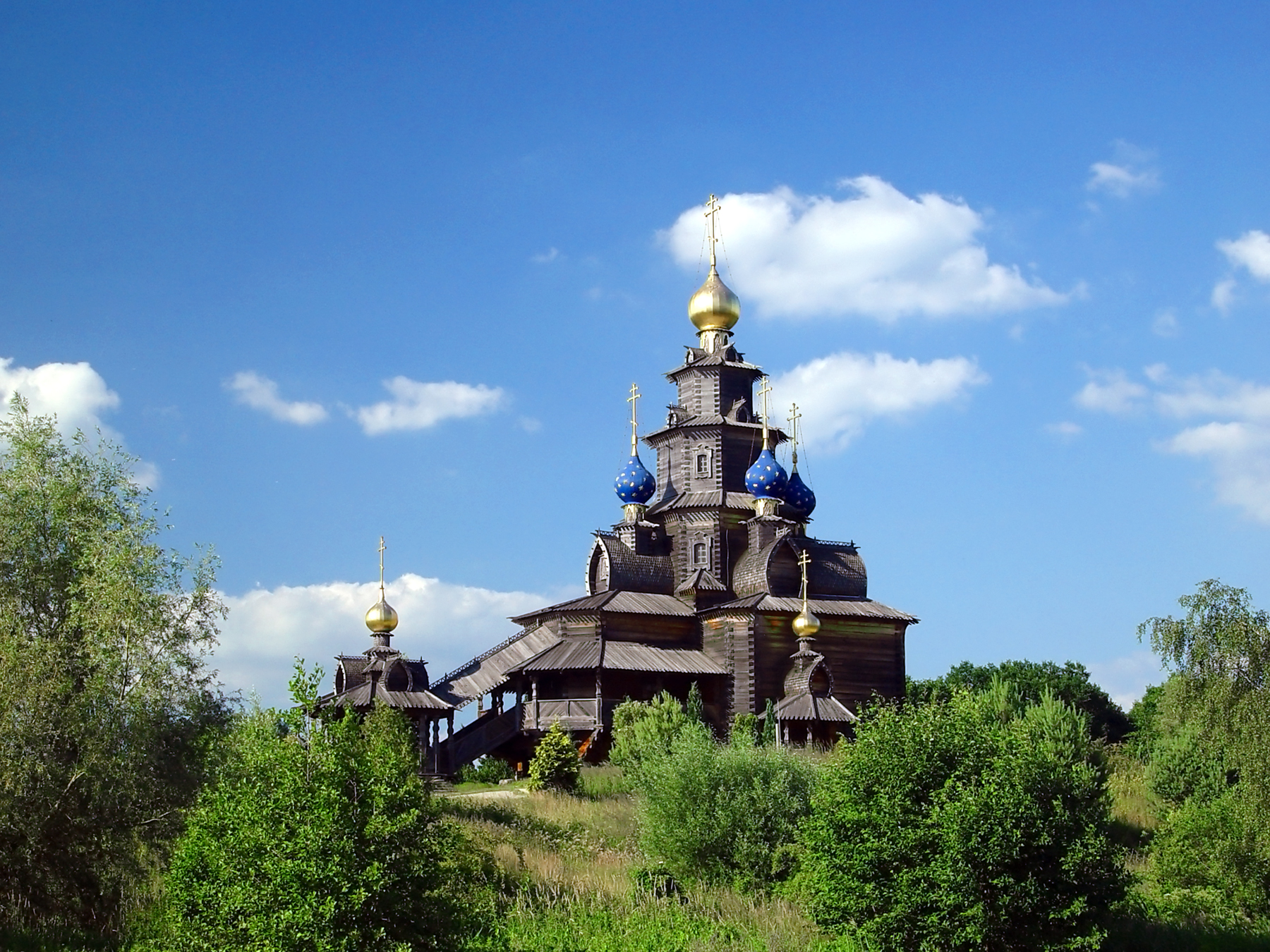
Russian stave church

The 27-metre-high stave church on the museum site with its eight gilded domes is a replica of the wooden Russian Orthodox church dedicated to Saint Nicholas. The Muscovite patriarch, Alexy II, formerly head of 100 million Russian Orthodox Christians, opened it in 1995. In the church there is an exhibition with liturgical artefacts (icons, oil lamps, candlesticks, vestments, embroidery, fonts and bibles) from the Moscow patriarchate. There is an additional charge for visiting the interior of this impressive, cathedral-like building, decorated with iconic paintings. The original was built in 1765 as a Transfiguration of Christ Church (Christi-Verklärungskirche) in the central Russian village of Kozlyatyevo (current name Polyany), Vladimir Oblast (now in Wooden Architecture Museum, Suzdal).

== Sources ==
- Wrobel, Rosita: Das internationale Wind- und Wassermühlenmuseum in: Museen und Ausflugziele im Raum Gifhorn-Wolfsburg, Gifhorn 1989.
