= Cloppenburg Museum Village =

Museum village in Germany

Coordinates: 52°50′56″N 8°03′04″E

The Cloppenburg Museum Village and Lower Saxon Open-Air Museum (German: Museumsdorf Cloppenburg – Niedersächsisches Freilichtmuseum) located in the Lower Saxon county town of Cloppenburg is the oldest museum village in Germany. The museum is a research and educational establishment specializing in cultural and rural history.

The Lower Saxon Open-Air Museum is a non-profit organisation. Although the museum does not set out to compete for visitors, in 2009 the Cloppenburg Museum Village had more visitors than any other museum in Lower Saxony (250,000). In 2004, the museum was visited by more than 60,000 students as a part of their school curriculum.

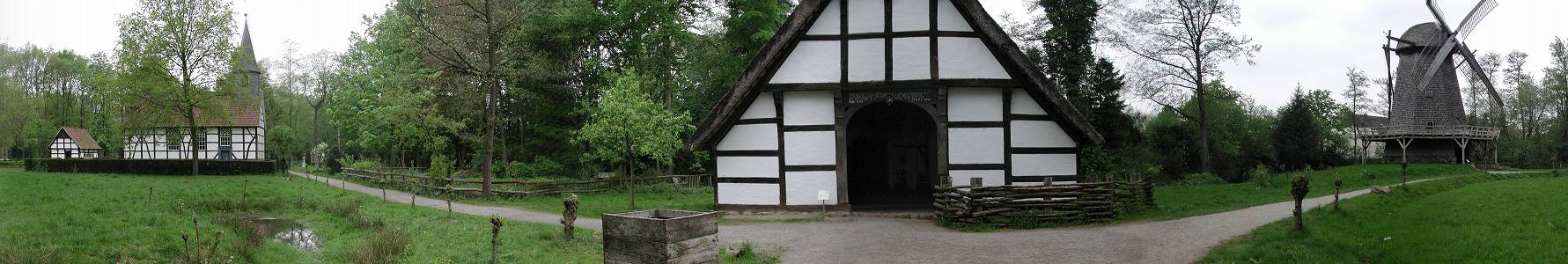
Cloppenburg Museum Village

== History ==
The Museum Village was laid out in 1934 by the Cloppenburg senior schoolmaster, Heinrich Ottenjann, and was ceremonially opened on Ascension Day in 1936. On 13 April 1945, six houses in the museum village were destroyed by artillery fire, including the Quatmannshof farm. By 1962, this farm had been rebuilt in a way that was faithful in detail to the original. The second museum director after Heinrich Ottenjann was his son, Helmut Ottenjann (1961–1996). From 1996 to 2018, Uwe Meiners has been the director of the open-air museum; since 2022, Torsten W. Müller has been its director.

== Purpose ==
Today, the Lower Saxon Open-Air Museum acts as a research and educational establishment for cultural and agricultural history. The museum's education facilities are always activity- and product-oriented.

Research work concentrates on folklore, regional history and historic rural houses. A team of three scientists is responsible for investigation and construction of new houses, work that is constantly supported by volunteers and project partners. This work is documented not just in scientific journals and volumes; the museum village also publishes its own books and papers. The scientific staff are supported by craftsmen, who maintain the museum village and demonstrate traditional crafts to its visitors.

Since 2009, the Carola Wüstefeld Foundation has supported the village by donating €50,000 annually for the maintenance of its buildings.

== Facilities ==
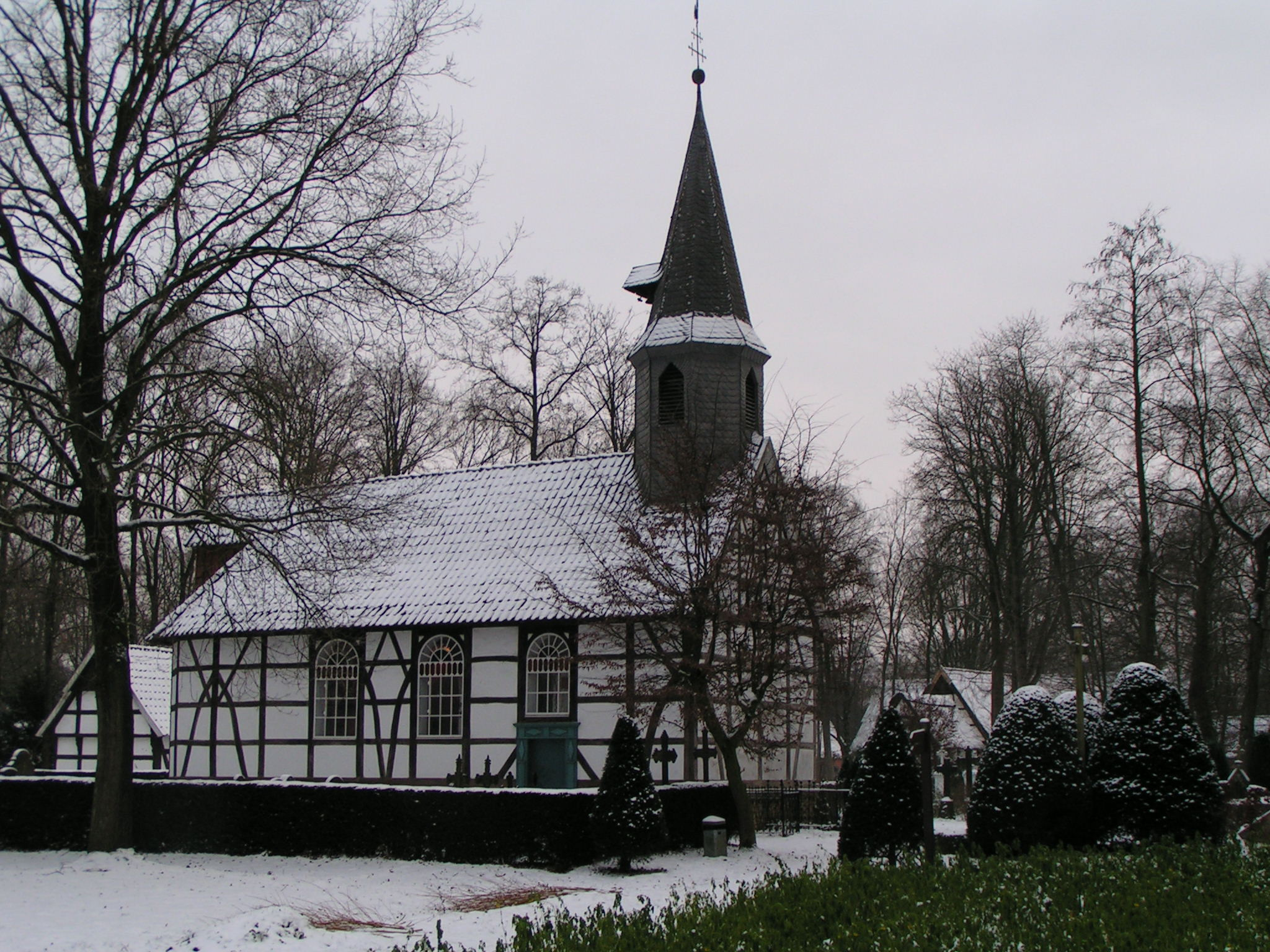
Timber-framed church from Klein-Escherde

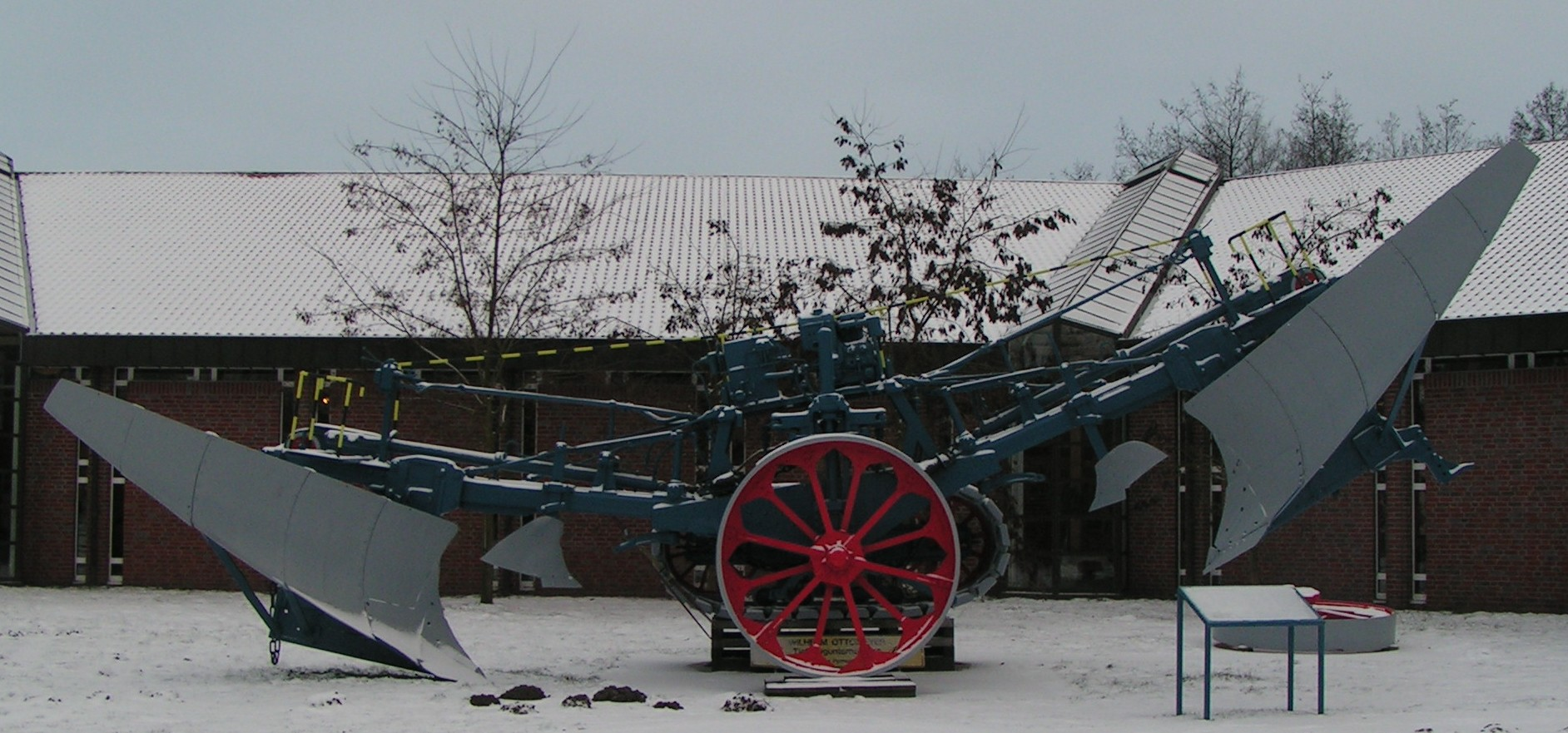
Moorland plough next to the Museum Village car park

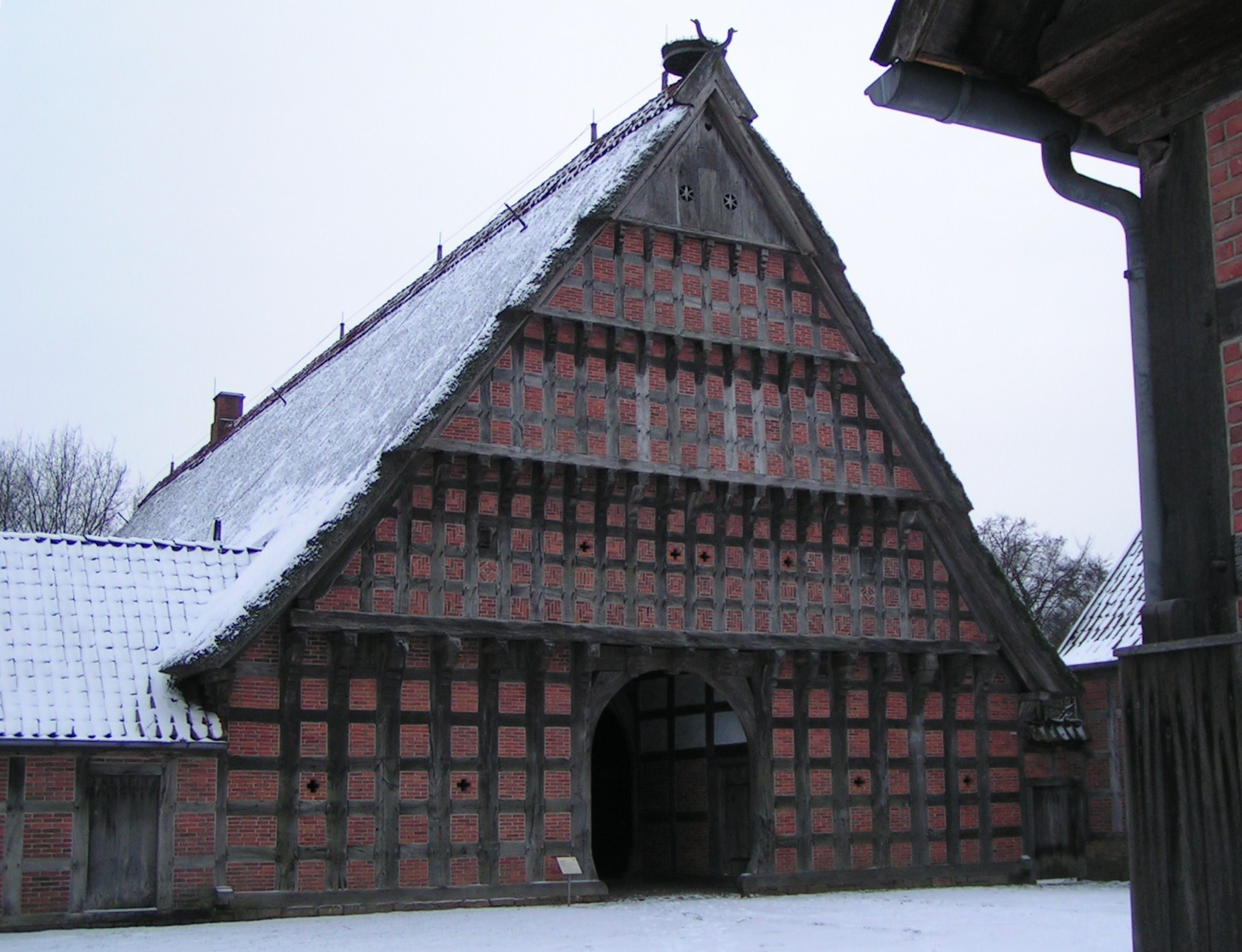
Wehlburg (an Artland farmstead)

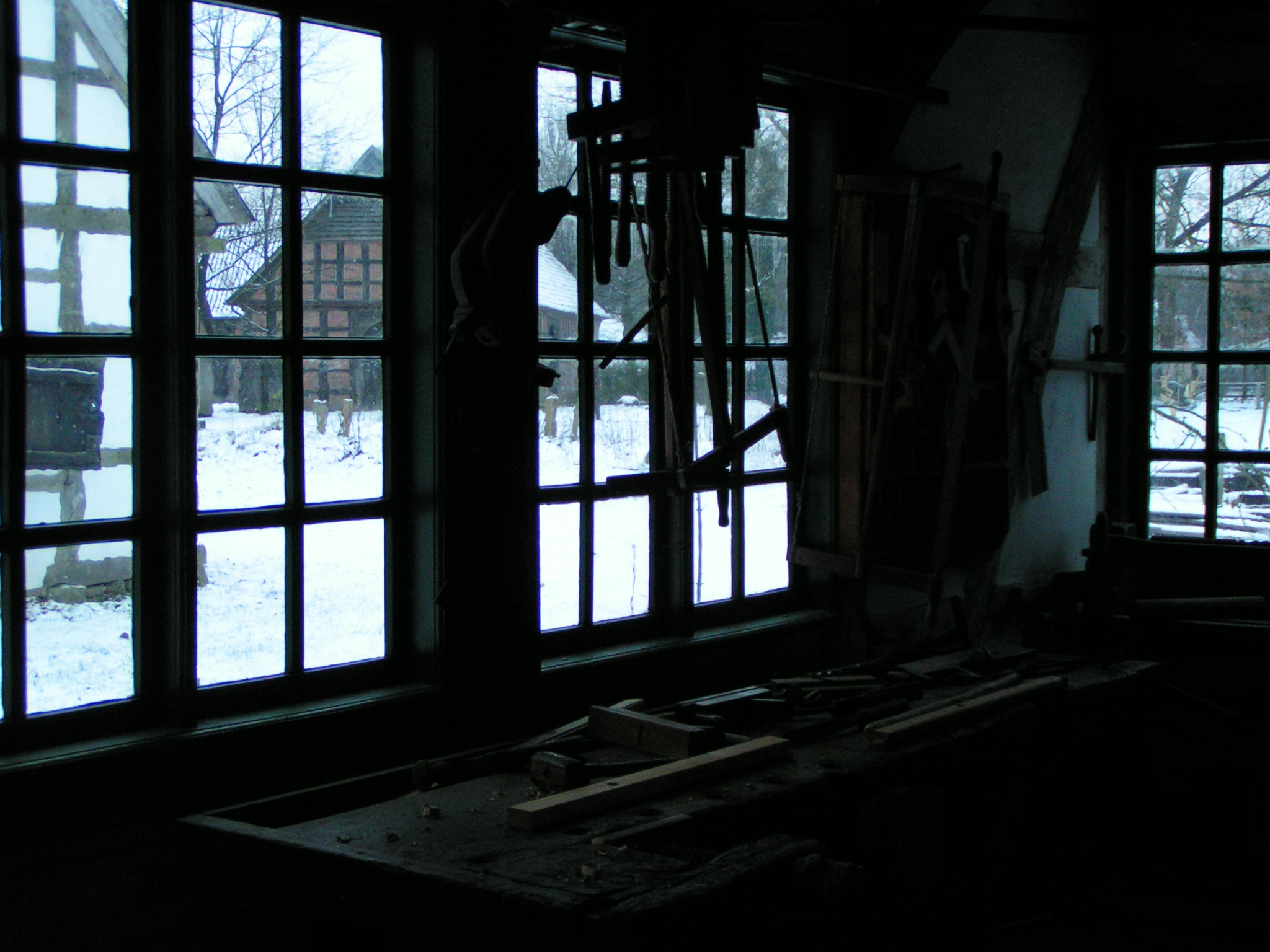
View from the joinery

Covering an area of about 20 hectares (49 acres), the Lower Saxon Open-Air Museum portrays the history of rural life in the Lower Saxony region from 16th century to the present. Over 50 historic buildings, with their associated rural gardens and surrounding agricultural fields, illustrate the relationship of man to his environment over the course of time.

In the early days a form of reconstruction was chosen that showed the houses in their original state. Important design variants of the Low German house and East Frisian Gulfhaus are presented in this way. Since the 1970s, houses have been re-assembled, conserving the traces of their history and illustrating aspects of the life of their former occupants.

In addition to buildings that underpinned farming and crafts and the residential homes of country folk, the museum terrain also has a timber framed church from Klein-Escherde (built in 1698) and a village school from Renslage (built in 1751).

Outside the actual museum village land, north of Höltinghauser Straße, a large moor plough displayed. More information about the individual exhibits is available in an interactive location plan.

In 2011, planning began on the construction of a new entrance hall and integrated cultural-historical centre. Funding will be provided by the state of Lower Saxony, and the district and town of Cloppenburg. In the same year, construction started on a wheelwrights home dating to 1564. On completion, it will be oldest building on the museum village site.

=== Agriculture and crafts – living and working buildings ===
Of the many buildings that were used for farming, the Quatmannshof (from Elsten, built in 1805) and the Wehlburg (from Wehdel, built in 1750) are especially worth mentioning. As well as farmhouses, servants' houses (Heuerhäuser) and farm workers' houses there are numerous examples of rural tradesmen's houses: a turner's, a whitesmith's, a farrier's, a blacksmith's, a coppersmith's, a leather shoemaker's, a clog maker's, a joiner's, a carpenter's workshop, a brewery, a cooper's, a blue printing works, a saddlery, a pottery, a goldsmith's and a silversmith's as well as technical cultural artefacts like grinding mills and engines.

The Cloppenburg Museum Village aims to display as complete a range as possible of the different types of old country crafts and their associated tools and equipment.

==== Mills ====
Since 2008 the Museum Village has been a stop on the Lower Saxon Mill Road. Tourists can see the following mills at this waypoint on the route:

- a post mill (Bockwindmühle or Ständermühle) from Essern (Nienburg district), probably built around 1638
- a smock mill (Kappenwindmühle, Galerieholländer, Achtkantwindmühle or Holländer) from Bokel (Cloppenburg district) from the year 1764
- a Kokerwindmühle windmill from Edewecht (Landkreis Ammerland) dating to 1879, originally conceived as a water scoop mill (Wasserschöpfmühle)
- a horse mill from Mimmelage (Osnabrück district); a wooden mill or horse gin, for milling corn, built around 1850 to 1890. Grain was milled with the aid of horses. The horse mill found in the threshing and grain barn of the Wehlburg farm from the year 1868 is the last of its kind in Lower Saxony, that has been preserved.
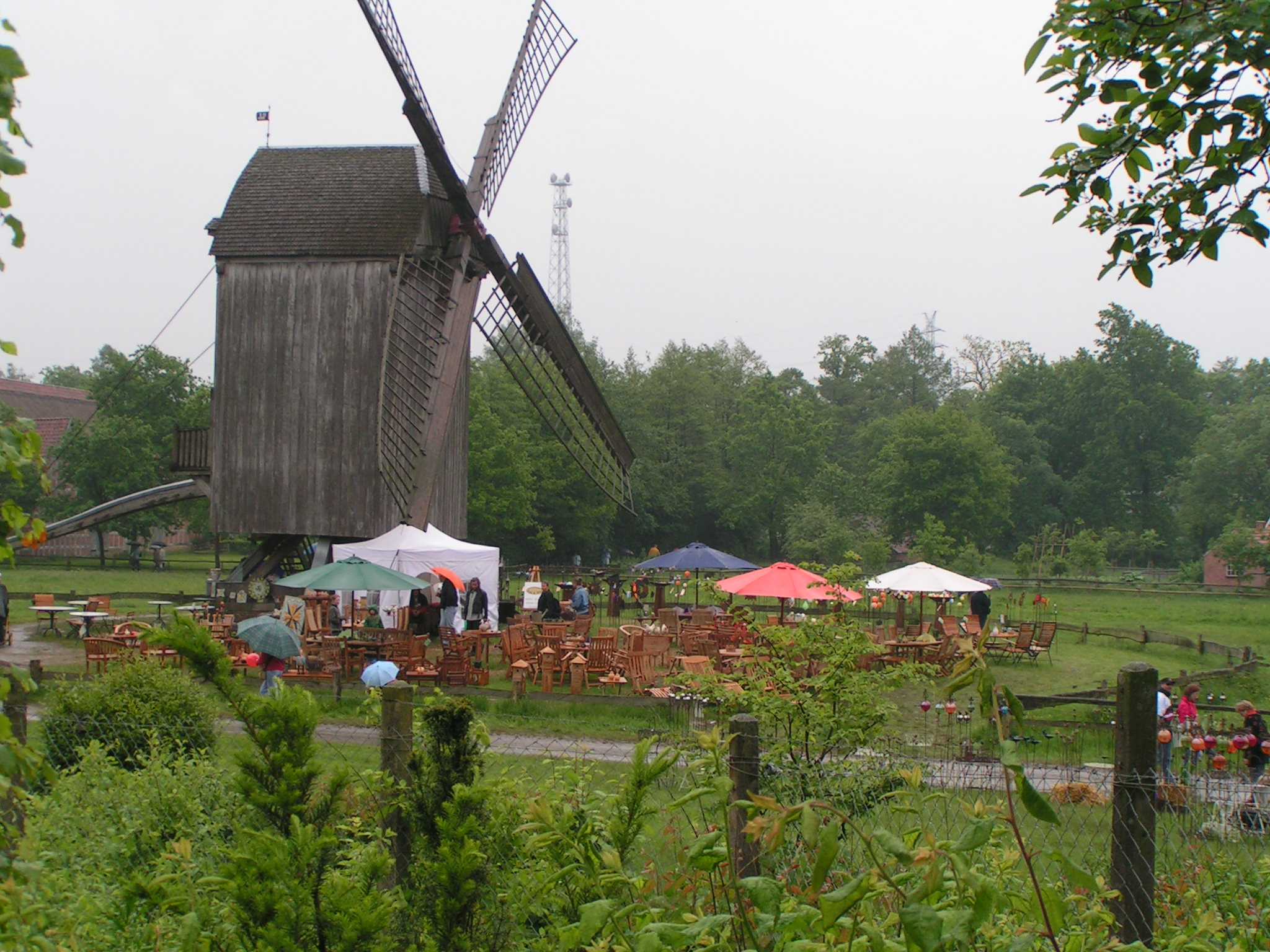
Post mill

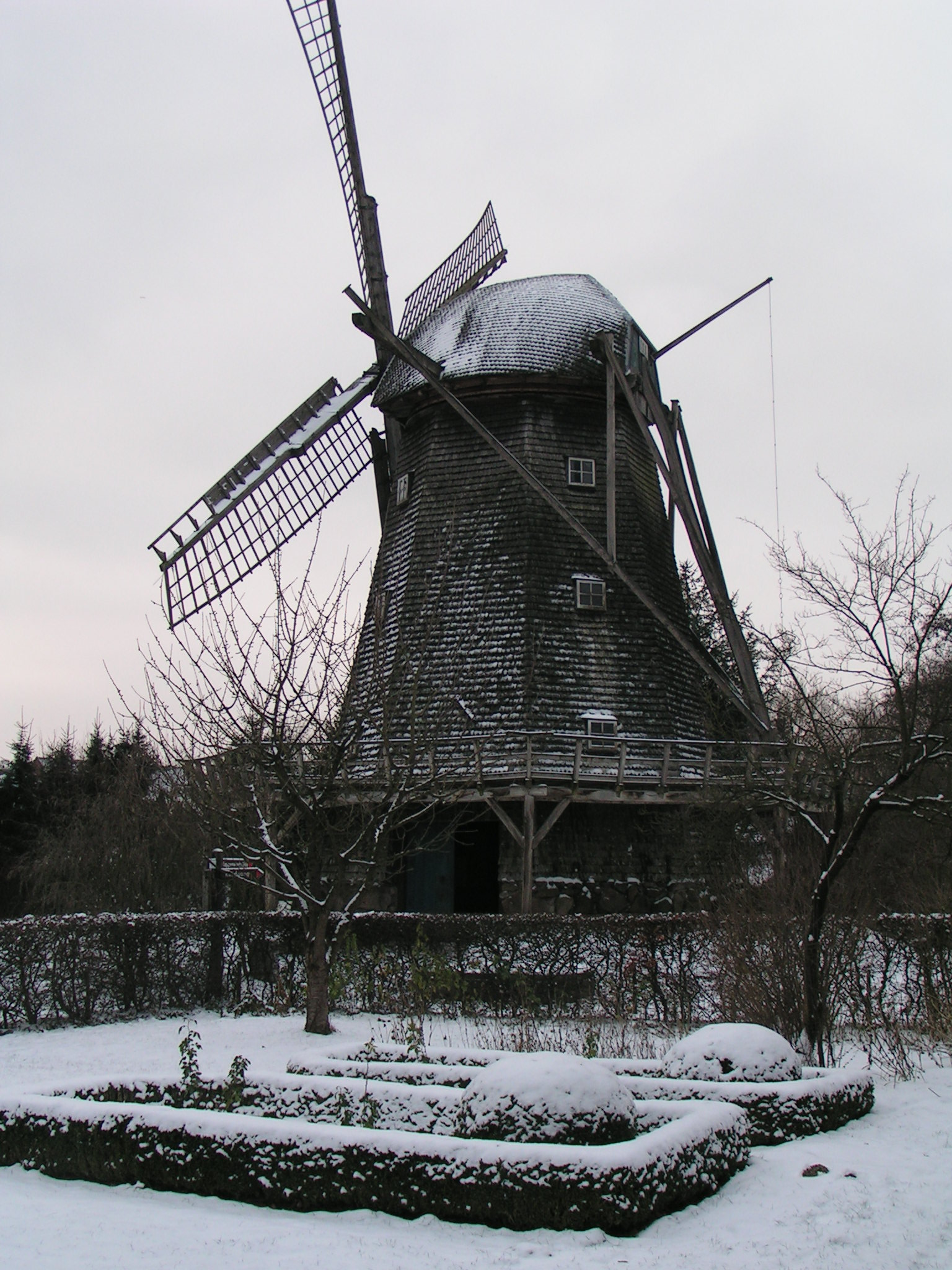
Smock mill

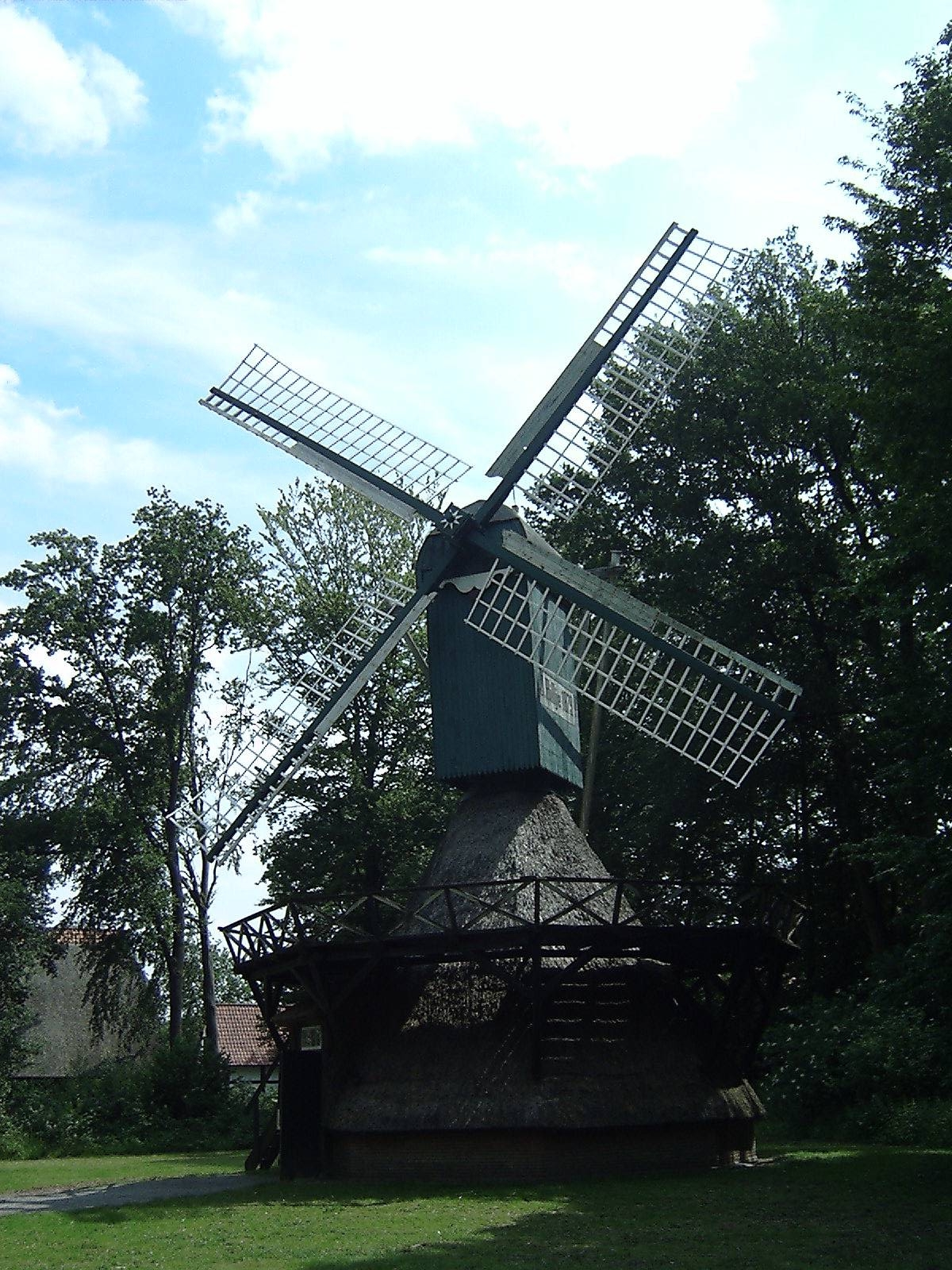
Koker windmill

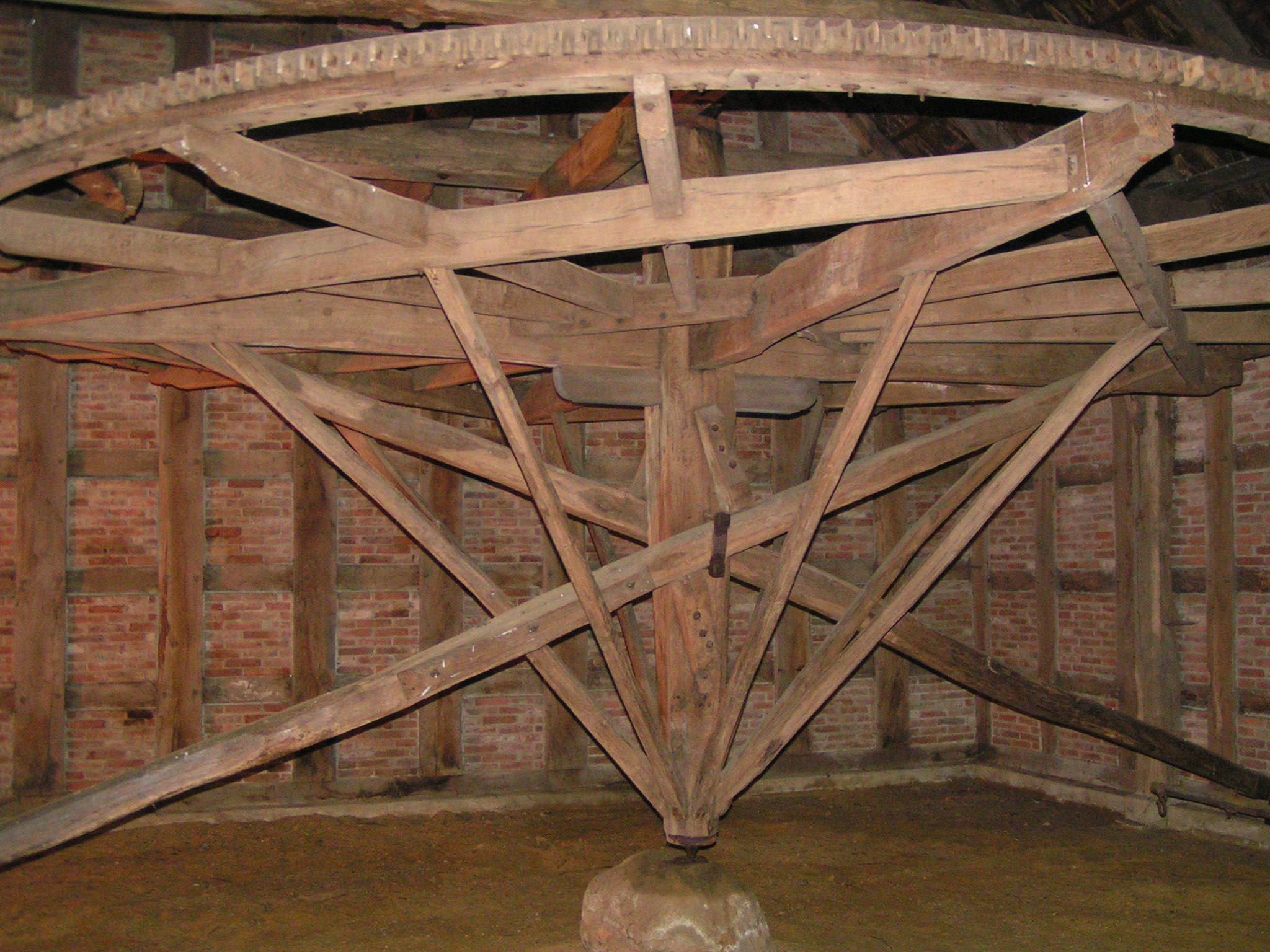
Horse gin in the barn of the Wehlburg farmstead

=== Collections and exhibitions ===
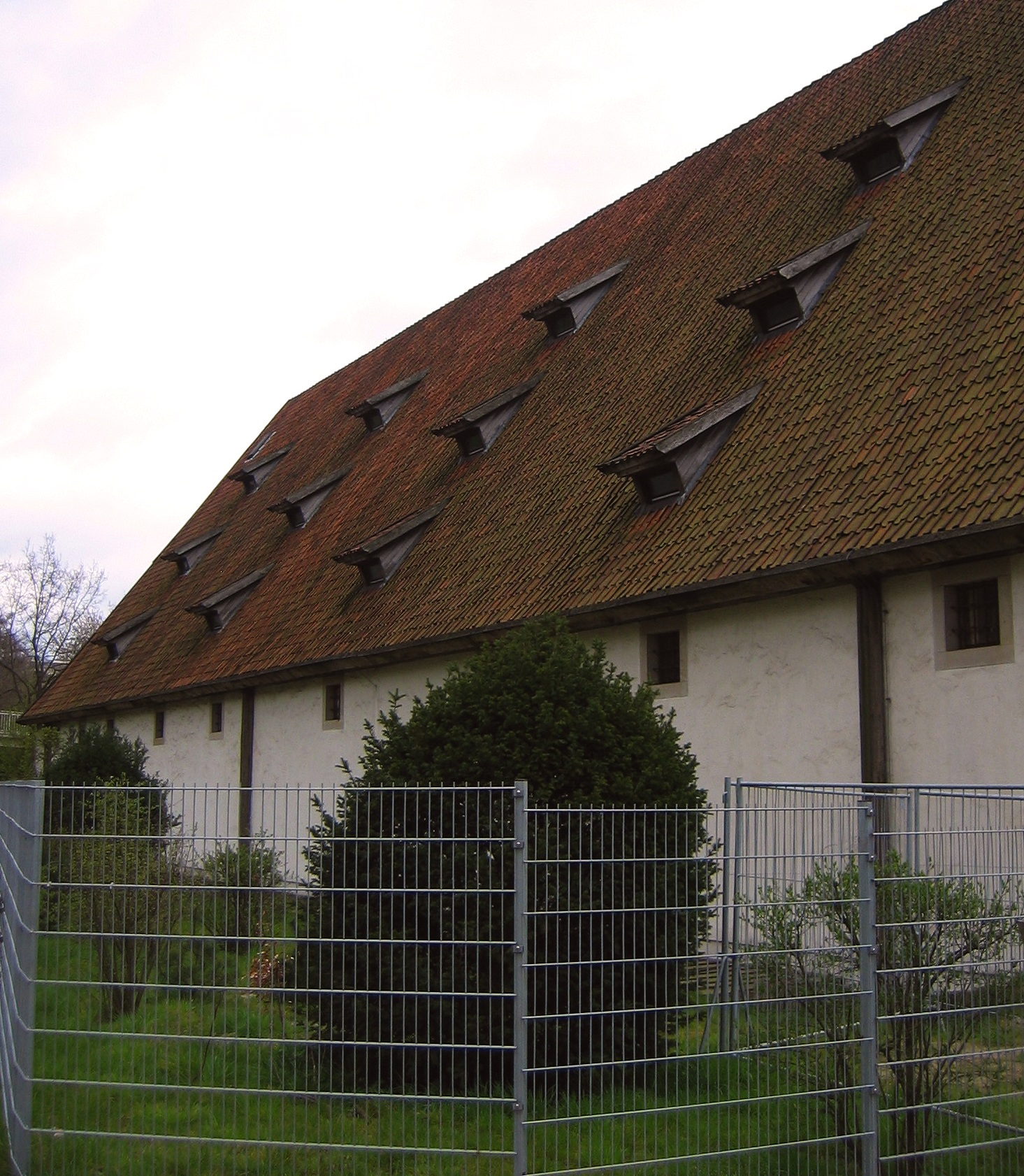
Münchhausen Barn Exhibition Hall

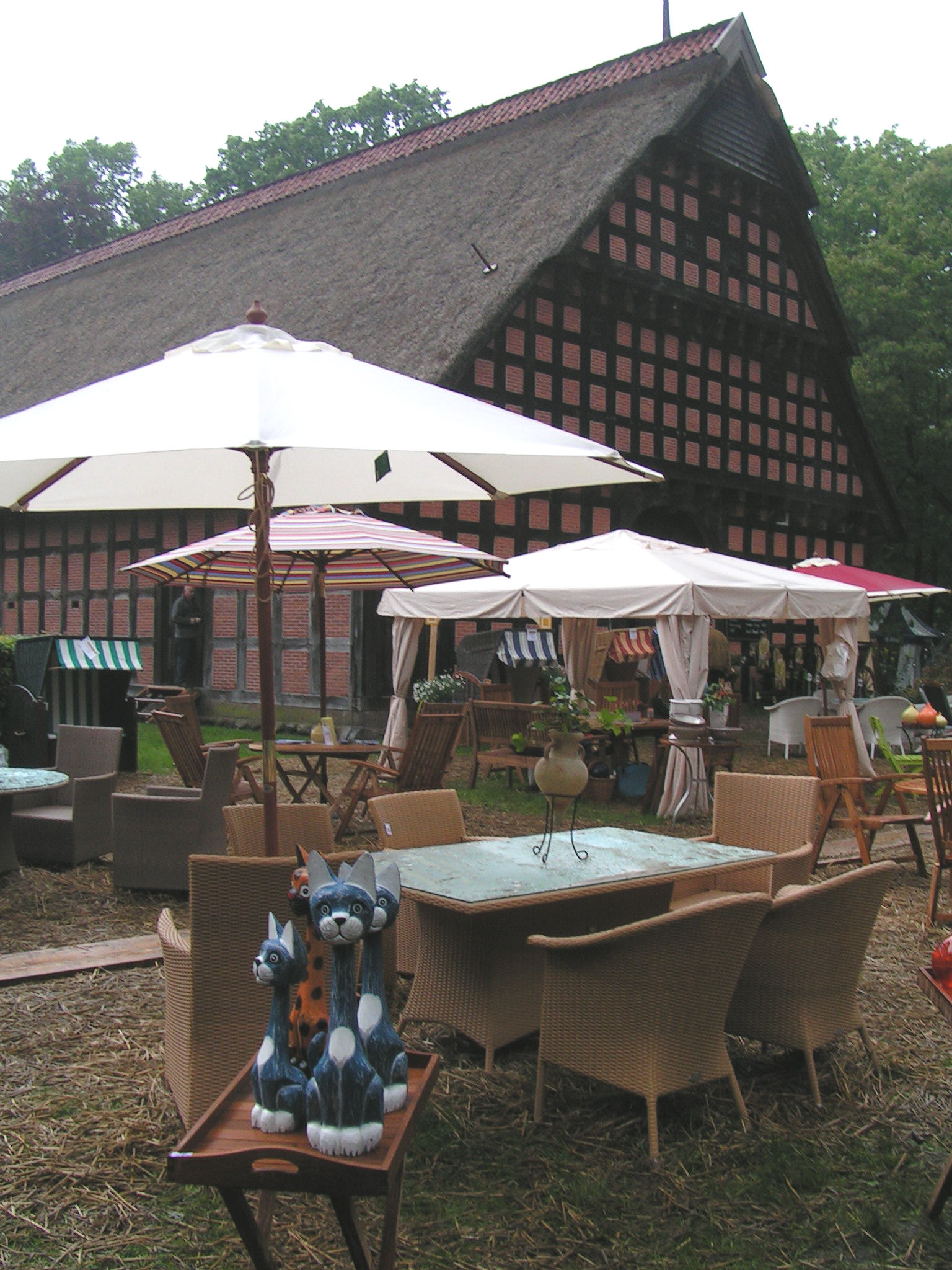
Quatmannshof during the garden party in 2006

The famous Oldenburg meteorite ('Bissel' fragment, 4.84 kg) is also kept in the museum's collection. The meteorite fell in 1930 onto the villages of Bissel (parish of Großenkneten) and Beverbruch (parish of Garrel).

The results of the extensive work of the museum are presented to the public by means of selected examples in regularly changing special exhibitions in Arkenstede Castle (Burg Arkenstede) and the Münchhausen Barn (Münchhausenscheune).

=== Outing ===
Since 2002, an annual garden festival has been organised at the Cloppenburg Museum Village between Ascension and the Sunday before Pentecost.

== The Genius loci ==
The museum's founding year of 1934 has given rise to the question of whether the Cloppenburg Museum Village was an expression of Nazi "blood and soil" mythology. This assumption has been inadvertently fostered by the Centre for Educational Media on the Internet (Zentrale für Unterrichtsmedien in the Internet (zum)), because they listed the history teachers of the Museum Village under "Cloppenburg Museum Village (NS)", the NS standing for Niedersachsen (Lower Saxony), not Nationalsozialismus (Nazism).

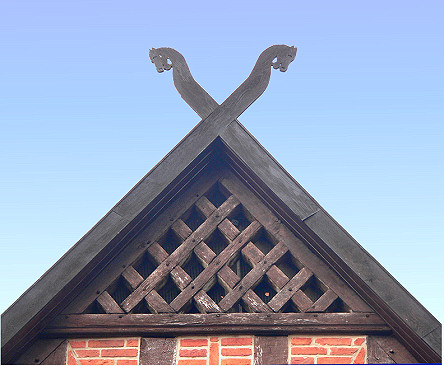
Horses' heads on top of the gable on a hall house

In fact the foundation of the Cloppenburg Museum Village should be seen more in the context of the growth of the local history movement in Germany. This had arisen as early as 1880 as a reaction to the urbanisation of Germany and from the desire of many towns to recall their agricultural roots. From this movement, in the state of Oldenburg, the Ammerland farmhouse in Bad Zwischenahn in 1910 and the Rauchkate in Neuenburg in 1912 emerged as places where memories could be brought to life. In 1922 a local history museum was founded in Cloppenburg itself.

From this movement, Heinrich Ottenjann developed the concept of the Cloppenburg Museum Village, an idea which came to fruition in 1934. The national socialists supported the idea of local history and exploited and ideologised the site which had in fact been based on folk and farming history, but never in the sense of becoming a Nazi cult site like the Stedingsehre project in Bookholzberg which was also supported by Gauleiter Carl Röver.

Today staff at the Cloppenburg Museum Village react rather irritatedly at the insinuation that there is a similarity between local history and Nazi ideology. The museum village not only holds regular events intended to throw light on Nazi 'demons', but its employees are also well enough informed. For example, when asked, they can comment on the theory that the horses' heads on Lower Saxon farmhouses (Lower Saxon houses) are relics of the sacrifice of horses, a myth widely disseminated by the Nazis, which does not stand up to the critical investigation by historians.

== See also ==
- Open-air museums in Germany

== Sources ==
- Hermann Kaiser, Helmut Ottenjann: Museumsführer Museumsdorf Cloppenburg – Niedersächsisches Freilichtmuseum, Stiftung Museumsdorf Cloppenburg (1995)- ISBN 3-923675-14-3
- Hermann Kaiser: Ein Haus und eine Familie in schweren Zeiten: Der Wiederaufbau der Hofanlage Wübbe M. Meyer aus Firrel, Ostfriesland im Museumsdorf Cloppenburg , Stiftung Museumsdorf Cloppenburg (2003) – ISBN 3-923675-92-5
