= Low Saxon (disambiguation) =

Low Saxon is a group of Low German dialects spoken in the Netherlands, Lower Saxony and most of Schleswig-Holstein.

Low Saxon or Lower Saxon may also refer to:

== Linguistics ==
- Low German, an Ingvaeonic West Germanic language
- Northern Low Saxon, the dialect spoken in the Northern parts of the Low Saxon language area
- Dutch Low Saxon, a group of Low Saxon dialects recognized as a minority language by the European Union

== Other uses ==
- Lower Saxon cuisine, a range of regional North German culinary traditions
- Lower Saxon house, a type of German timber-framed house
- Lower Saxon Landtag, the Parliament of Lower Saxony
- Lower Saxon Mill Road, a holiday route that guides visitors to windmills and watermills in Lower Saxony

== See also ==
- Lower Saxony (disambiguation)
- Old Saxon, the earliest recorded form of Low German
- Upper Saxon, a Central German dialect
