= Lower Saxony (disambiguation) =

Lower Saxony is a component state of the Federal Republic of Germany established in 1946.

Lower Saxony may also refer to:

- Saxe-Lauenburg (1260/1296–1876), a component duchy of the Holy Roman Empire, the German Confederation, the North German Confederation, and the German Empire, commonly called Lower Saxony between the 14th and 17th centuries
- Lower Saxon Circle (1500–1806), a tax levying and army recruitment district and constituency of the Holy Roman Empire

== See also ==
- Low Saxon (disambiguation)
