= Oldenburg meteorite =

Meteorite found in Germany

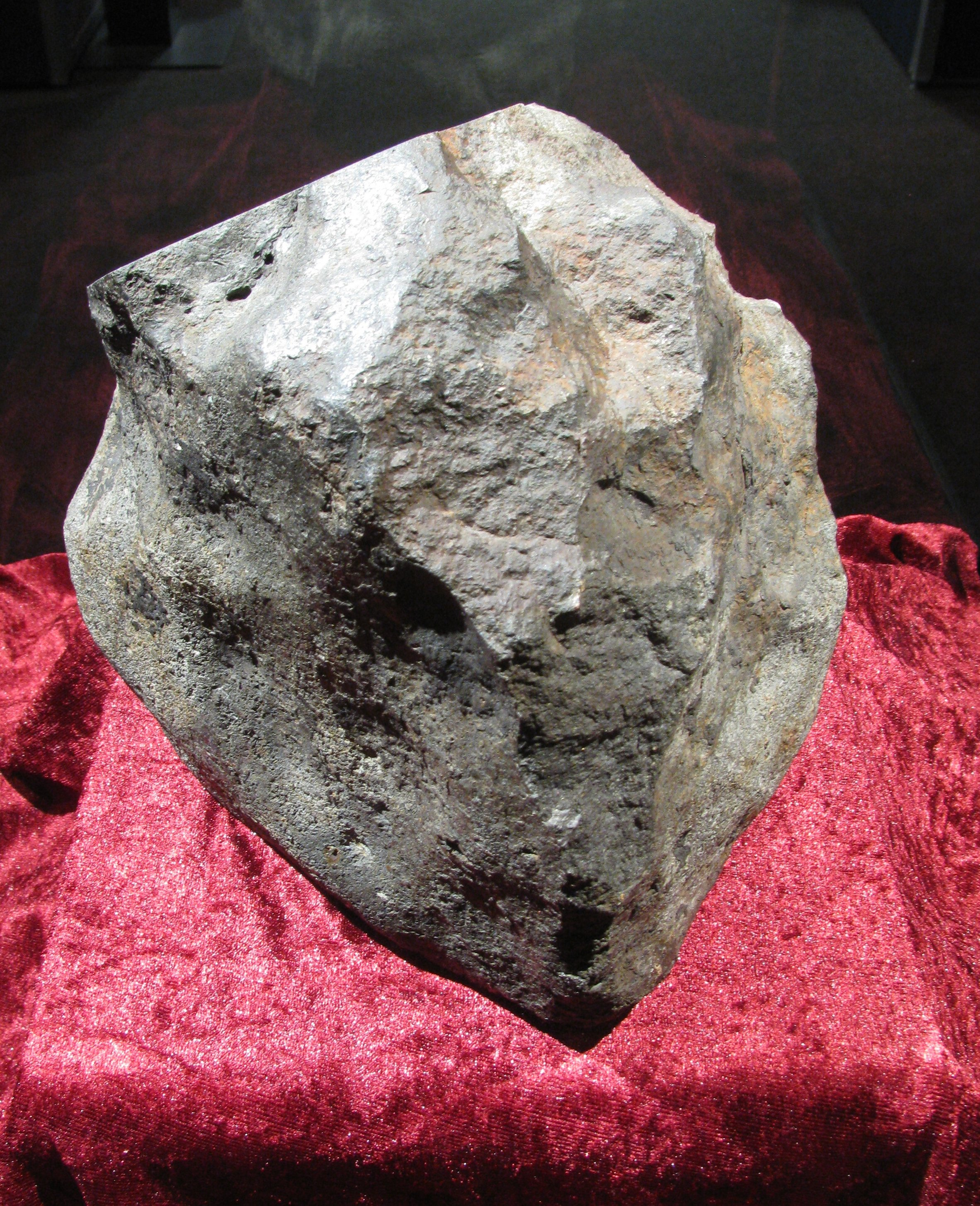
- The larger of the two stones.
- Type: Chondrite
- Class: Ordinary chondrite
- Group: L6
- Composition: FeNi metal: 10–50% Ni, 0.25–0.7% Co
- Country: Germany
- Region: Lower Saxony
- Coordinates: 52°57′N 8°10′E
- Observed fall: Yes
- Fall date: 1930-09-10 14:15
- TKW: 16.57 kilograms (36.5 lb)
- Related media on Wikimedia Commons

The Oldenburg meteorite fell 23 km from Oldenburg, Lower Saxony, Germany on 10 September 1930, one stone falling in Bissel, the other in Beverbruch. The mass of this meteorite is 16.57kg.

== See also ==
- Glossary of meteoritics
