= Polyany, Kolchuginsky District, Vladimir Oblast =

Polyany Поляны
- Village
- Location within Vladimir Oblast Location within Russia
- Coordinates: 56°11′N 39°10′E
- Country: Russia
- Region: Vladimir Oblast
- District: Kolchuginsky District
- Time zone: UTC+3:00

Polyany (Russian: Поляны, before 1966 – Kozlyatyevo, Russian: Козлятьево) is a rural locality (a village) in Razdolyevskoye Rural Settlement, Kolchuginsky District, Vladimir Oblast, Russia. The population was 5 as of 2010.

== Geography ==
Polyany is located 32 km southwest of Kolchugino (the district's administrative centre) by road. Novaya is the nearest rural locality.
