= Lower Saxon Mill Road =

Holidays street in Lower Saxony

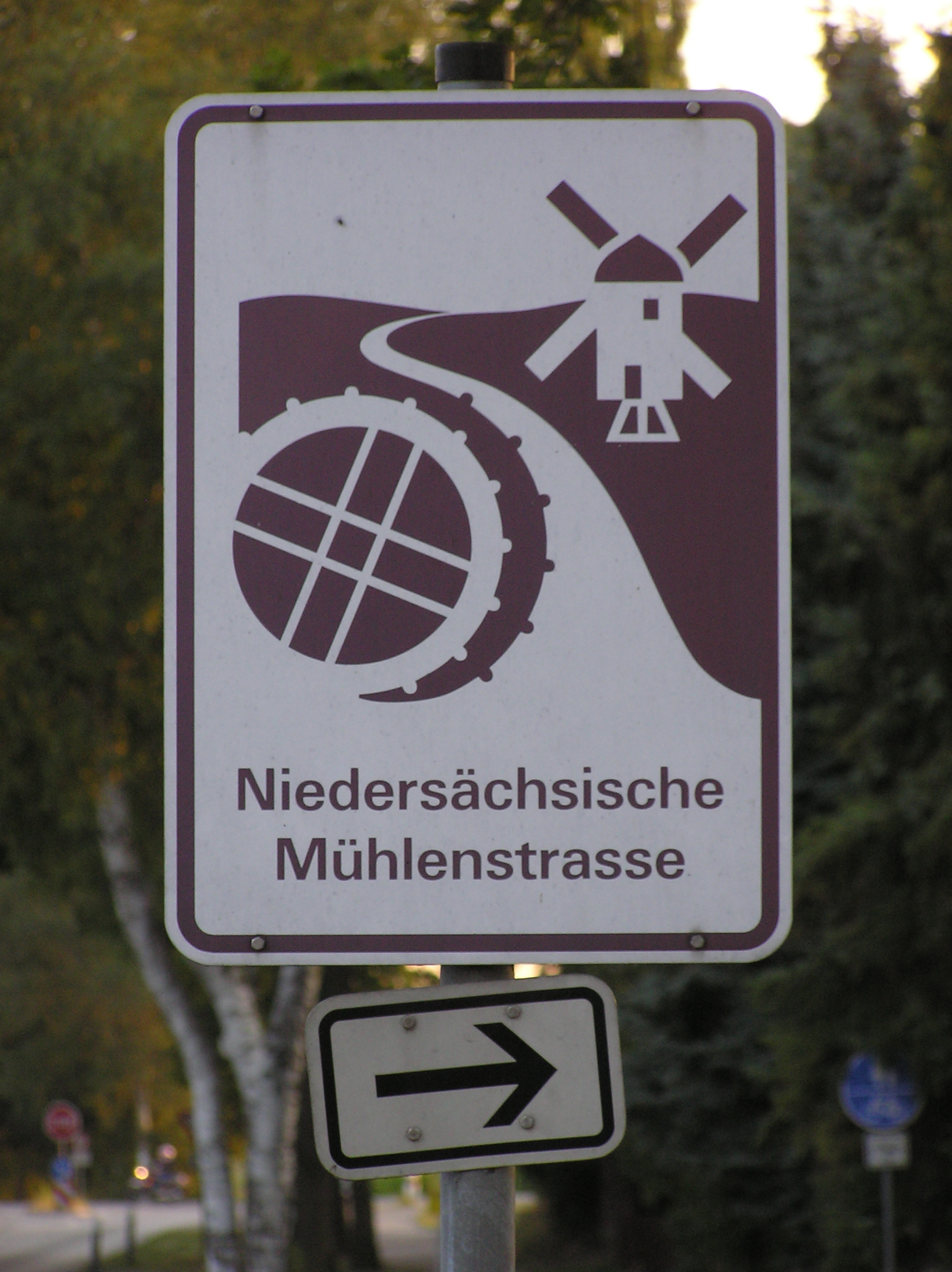
Mill sign on the Lower Saxon Mill Road

The Lower Saxon Mill Road (German: Niedersächsische Mühlenstrasse) is a holiday route that guides visitors to watermills and windmills in the north German state of Lower Saxony and thus links the interests of historic monument conservation with those of the tourist industry.

== Emblem ==
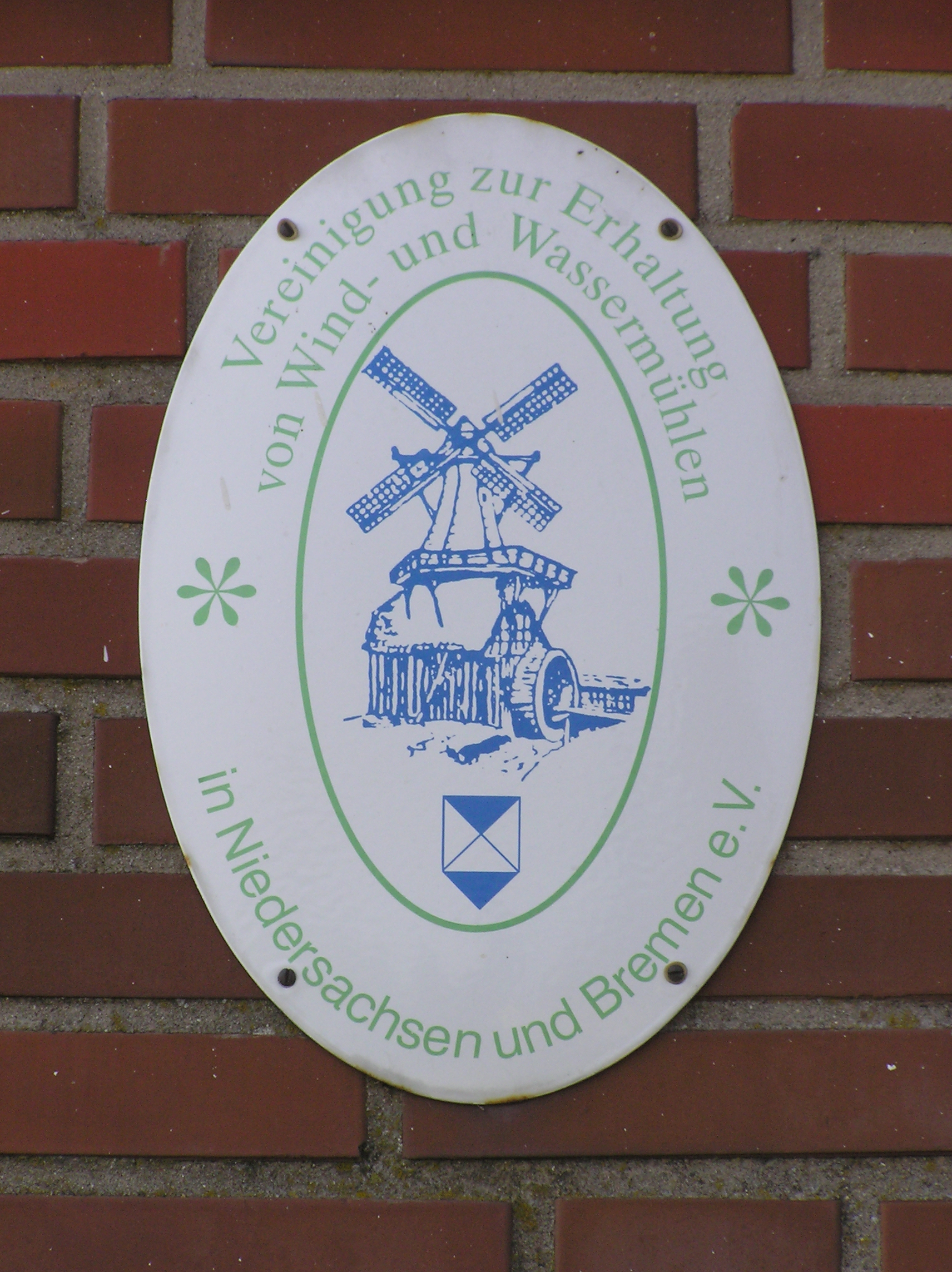

The mills of the Lower Saxon Mill Road are marked with the emblem (a sketch of the Hüven Mill in the Emsland) of the Lower Saxony and Bremen Mill Association (Mühlenvereinigung Niedersachsen-Bremen) and are furnished with an information board that describes both the history and the features of the individual mill.

== Range ==
The mills on the Lower Saxon Mill Road are of various types: Most of them are watermills and windmills. Some have been converted into homes, others are used as museums or are still in service. Several of the mills can only be viewed externally. In the International Wind- and Watermill Museum at Gifhorn a ship mill may also be visited. There are horse mills in the Cloppenburg and Hösseringen Museum Villages. In several buildings, not otherwise identifiable as mills, there are motor mills (Motormühlen); a building in the village of Einen near Goldenstedt houses a former korn distillery with a steam mill. Hydropower stations like the Oldau power station on the river Aller also count as 'mills' for the purposes of the Lower Saxon Mill Road.

The Lower Saxon Mill Road also has windmills without sails and watermills without water wheels. Their inclusion should act as an incentive to owners to complete their mills.

== History ==
The idea for the Lower Saxon Mill Road project emerged in 1996. At that time the Lüneburg Regional Council was looking for ways to improve tourism in a lasting way in northern Lower Saxony. As early as 1995 it had founded a society under the name "Society for the Promotion of Historic Mills in the Region of the Lüneburg Milling Industry" (Verein zur Förderung historischer Mühlen im Gebiet der Müllerinnung Lüneburg). This society had the aim of restoring windmills and watermills in its area, which initially covered the districts of Lüneburg, Harburg and Lüchow-Dannenberg, and supporting their preservation. The society also declared that it wanted to foster and preserve the traditions and culture associated with the milling trade.

Under the sponsorship of the Lüneburg Society, a working group was founded in 1996 from representatives of the district authorities, mill societies and local history museums. It gave the go ahead for the development of a tourist route through the mills of Lower Saxony. In 1998 the Lower Saxon Mill Road was established by the society, now renamed as the "Society for the Promotion of Lüneburg Mills" (Mühlenförderverein Lüneburg). Under its new name, the area of responsibility of the society was extended to include the districts of Celle and Uelzen. The first section of the Lower Saxon Mill Road was opened by the then Lower Saxon Minister for Agriculture, Karl-Heinz Funke, on German Mill Day in 1998 at the Bardowick windmill. The Mill Road then consisted of 75 mill sites in the northeast of Lower Saxony.

From 1998 the Lüneburg mill society was responsible for coordinating, monitoring and implementing the restoration and refurbishment of mills on the Lower Saxon Mill Road and for the development of touristic marketing concepts as well as funding them from German and European sponsors.

Since 1996 the Lower Saxon state parliament has pursued the aim of extending the Mill Road to the whole of Lower Saxony. For that reason in 2004 leadership of the project was transferred to the statewide "Lower Saxony and Bremen Mill Association" ( Mühlenvereinigung Niedersachsen-Bremen). Other regions between the North Sea and the rivers Elbe and Weser were added to the road in 2005. On 8 July 2006 the Mill Road was expanded into the area between the Weser and the Hunte (the districts of Nienburg/Weser and Diepholz). In 2006 the route was 2,130 kilometres (1,320 mi) long and incorporated 256 mills.

With the conclusion of the EU Sponsor Programme for the Development of Typical Rural Areas in August 2006 further expansion into the remaining Lower Saxon districts was temporarily halted.

In 2009 public funding became available again. In that year the districts of Cloppenburg, Oldenburg and Vechta joined the Lower Saxon Mill Road. The section in the "Oldenburg Münsterland and Wildeshausen Geest Region" was officially opened on 28 May 2009 at the Neumühle ("New Mill") in Endel (in the municipality of Visbek). Today the Lower Saxon Mill Road is 2,800 kilometres (1,700 mi) long and links 301 historic mills across North Germany.

The next regions to be incorporated into the Lower Saxon Mill Road will be the East Frisian districts of Aurich, Leer, Wittmund as well as the Oldenburg districts of Ammerland, Friesland and Wesermarsch. By 2011 all the regions and districts of Lower Saxony should be covered.

== Organisation and funding ==
Today the "Mill Road Working Group" of the "Lower Saxony and Bremen Mill Association" (Arbeitsgruppe Mühlenstraße in der Mühlenvereinigung Niedersachsen-Bremen) is responsible for handling all issues to do with the Lower Saxon Mill Road. The Lower Saxon Minister of Agriculture, currently Hans-Heinrich Ehlen, acts as its patron. The Mill Road is supported by 120 sponsor organisations and societies across the state.

In 2009 the participating districts and towns contributed €3,000 each. A grant of €9,800 is anticipated from the Lower Saxon State Department for Geographic Information, Land Development and Property.

== Mill locations ==
The Lower Saxon Mill Road leads to mills in the following districts and towns:

=== In Lower Saxony ===
==== Lüneburg Heath Region ====
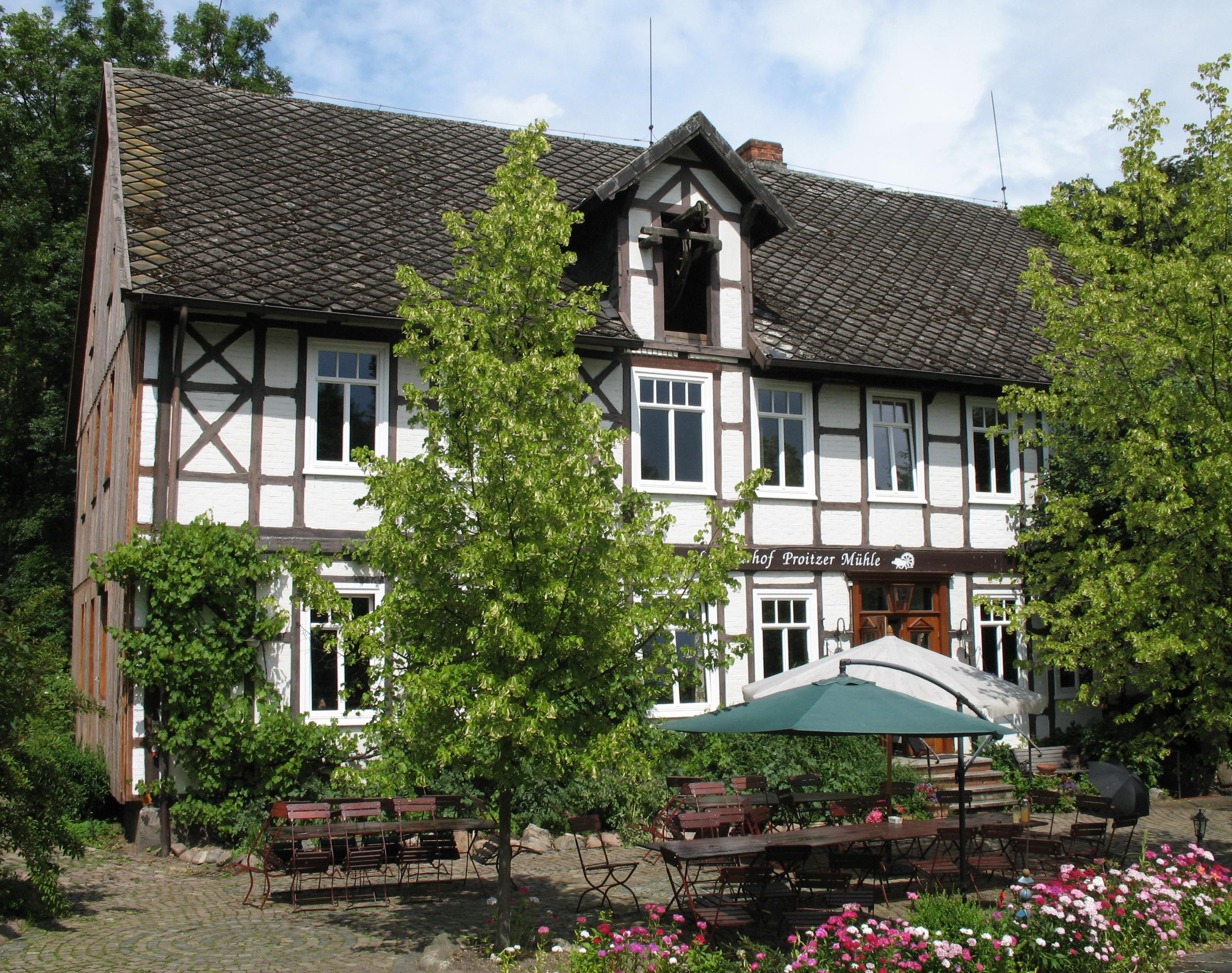
Proitze Mill (Proitzer Mühle) in Schnega-Proitze

- Celle district
- Gifhorn district
- Harburg district
- Lüchow-Dannenberg district
- Lüneburg district
- Soltau-Fallingbostel district
- Uelzen district

==== Region between the Rivers Weser and Hunte ====
- Diepholz district
- Nienburg district

==== Weserbergland Region ====
- Hameln-Pyrmont district
- Holzminden district
- Schaumburg district

==== Region between the North Sea, the River Elbe and the River Weser ====
- Cuxhaven district
- Osterholz district
- Rotenburg (Wümme) district
- Stade district
- Verden district

==== Oldenburg Münsterland and Wildeshausen Geest Region ====
- Cloppenburg district
- Oldenburg district
- Oldenburg
- Vechta district

The windmill Paula in Steinhude also lies along the Lower Saxon Mill Road as does the post mill (Bockwindmühle) in Hänigsen (both mills are in the Hanover Region).

→ See also: List of windmills in Lower Saxony

Outside Lower Saxony, the following mills also belong to the Lower Saxon Mill Road:

=== Bremen state ===
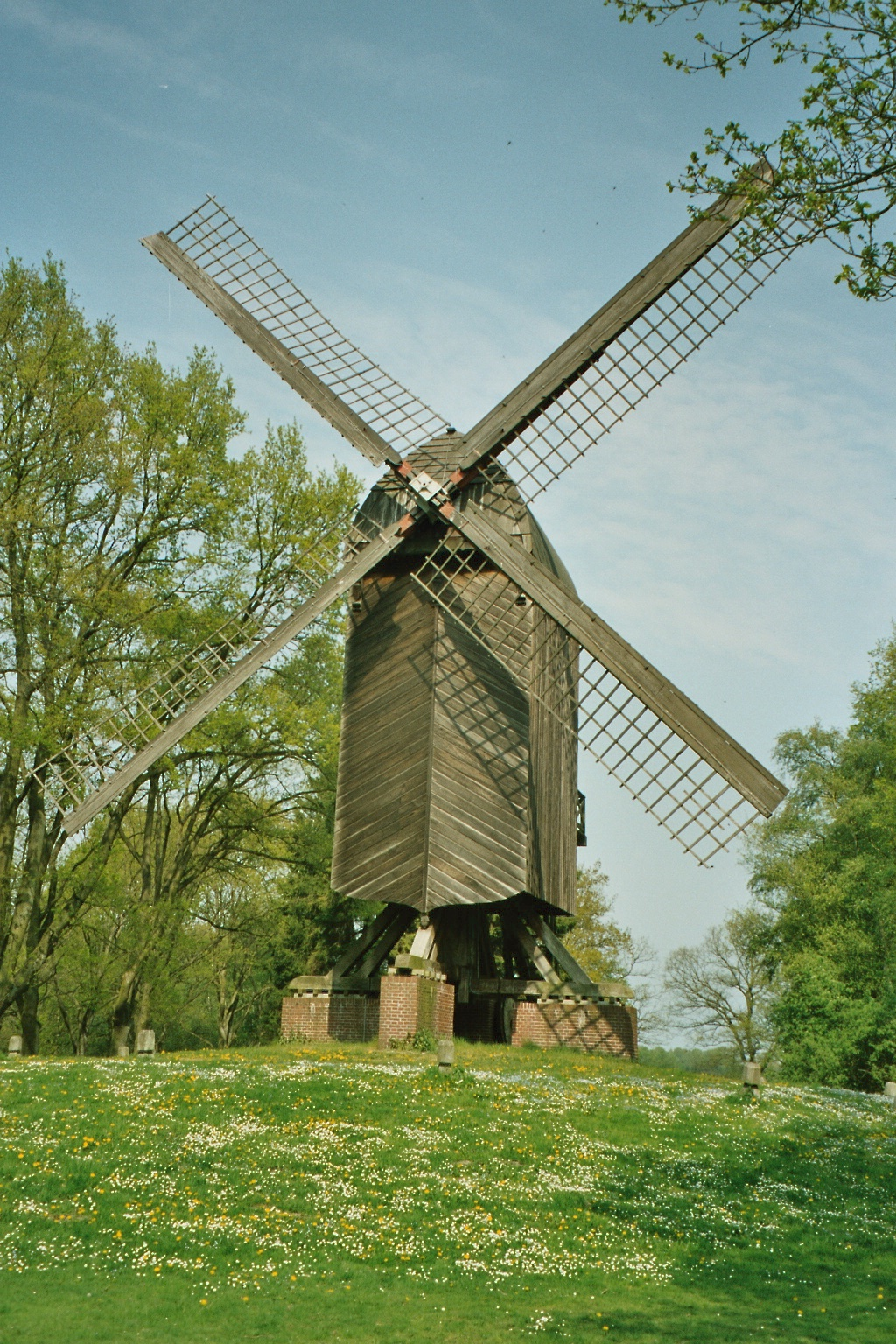
A post mill at the Bremerhaven Open Air Museum (Lower Saxon Mill Road No. 22)

- Four windmills in the city of Bremen
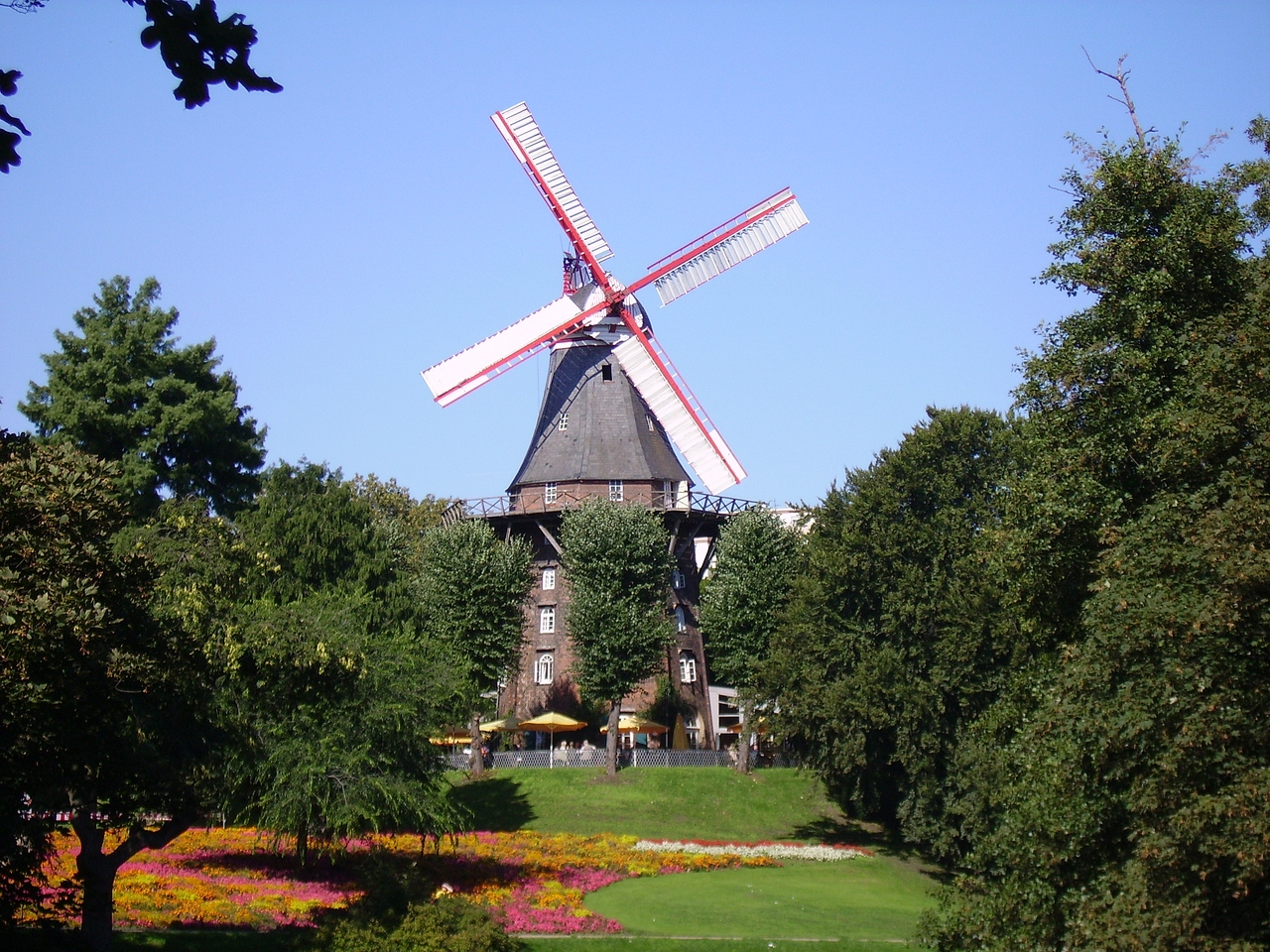
Am Wall windmill (Lower Saxon Mill Road No.41)

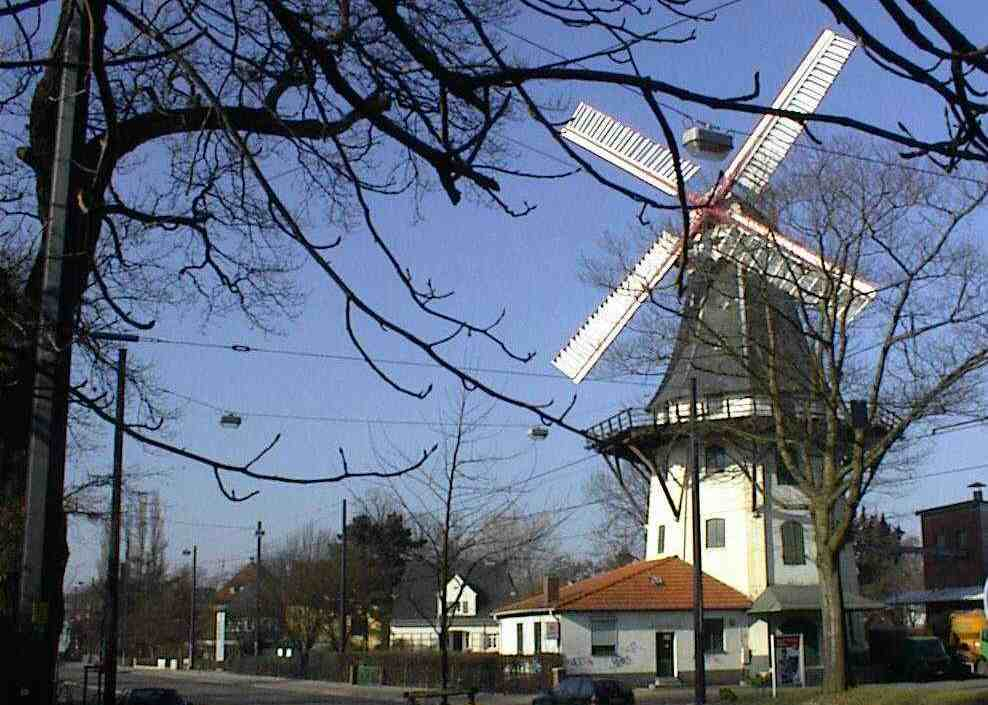
Horner mill (Lower Saxon Mill Road No. 42)

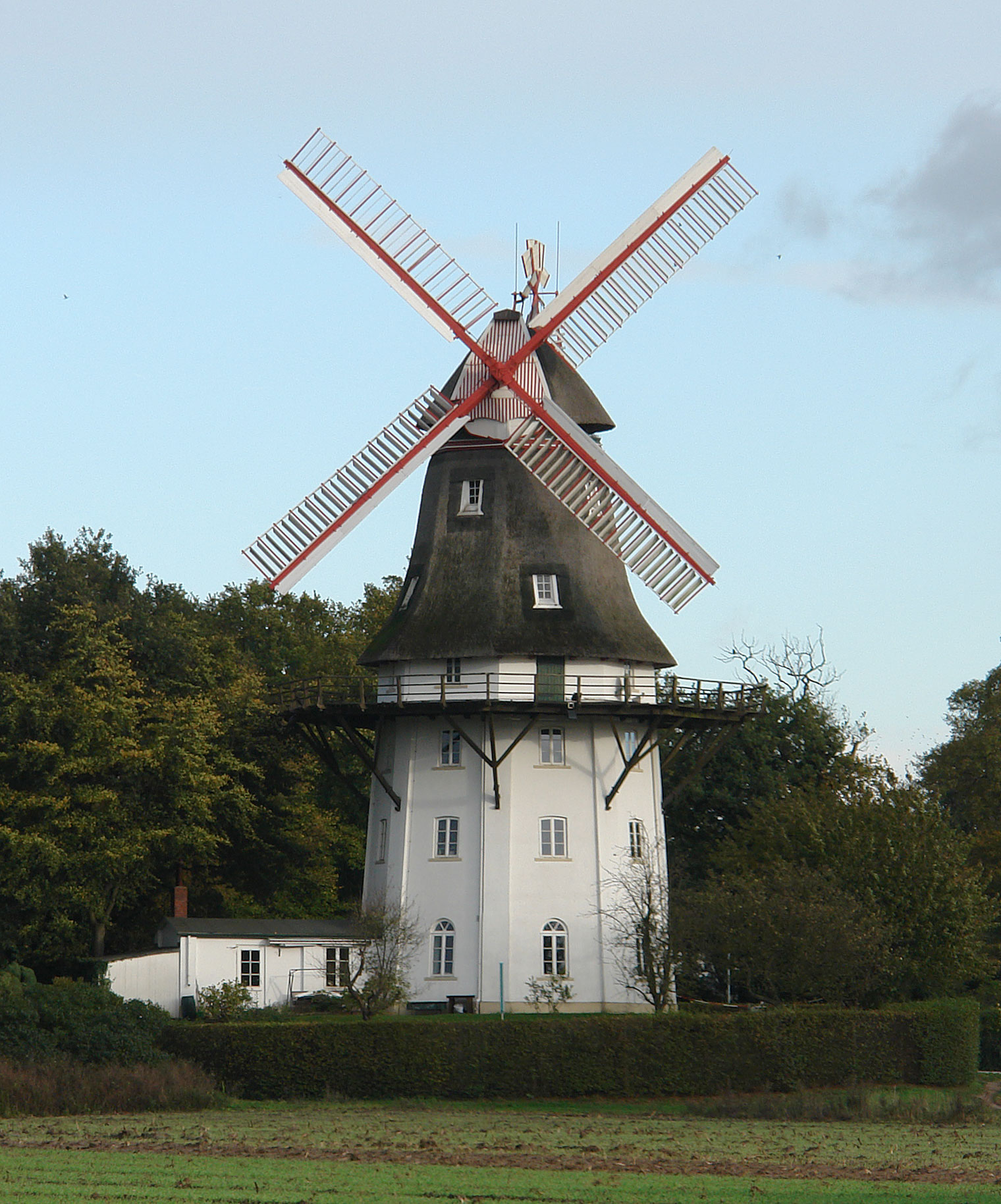
Oberneuland mill (Lower Saxon Mill Road No. 43)

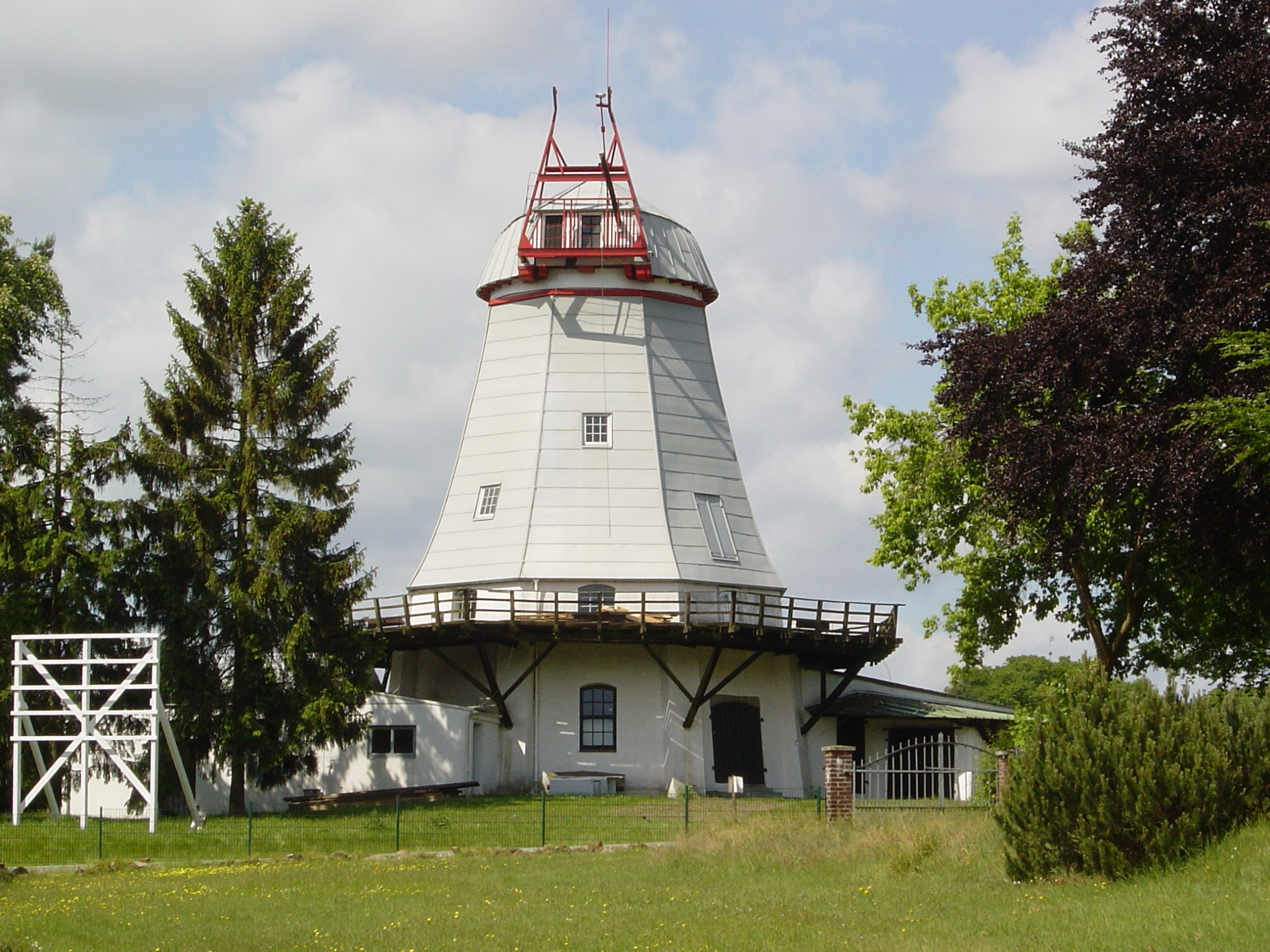
Arberger mill (Lower Saxon Mill Road No. 44)
- A windmill in the city of Bremerhaven

=== In Schleswig-Holstein ===
- A windmill in Lauenburg

=== In Mecklenburg-Vorpommern ===
- A watermill in Brahlstorf

== Individual mills ==
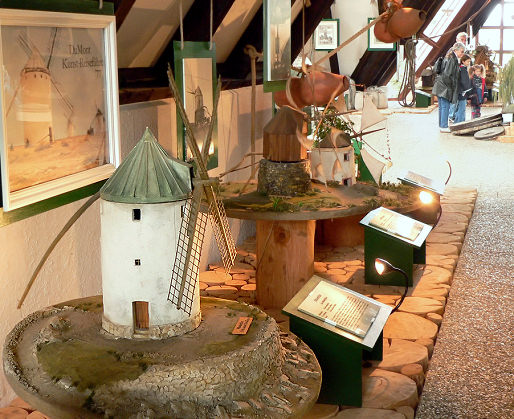
Display of mill models in the International Wind- and Watermill Museum

Lower Saxon Mill Road No. 65

=== International Wind- and Watermill Museum at Gifhorn ===
On 15 hectares of land at the International Wind- and Watermill Museum in Gifhorn there are 14 rebuilt, original and replica mills from across Europe and, in one case, from Korea, set in landscapes typical of their place of origin. In the exhibition hall there are numerous mill models. Also on the site is a village square (the Dorfplatz) with Lower Saxon houses and a Russian stave church.

=== Eyendorf windmill (Harburg district) ===
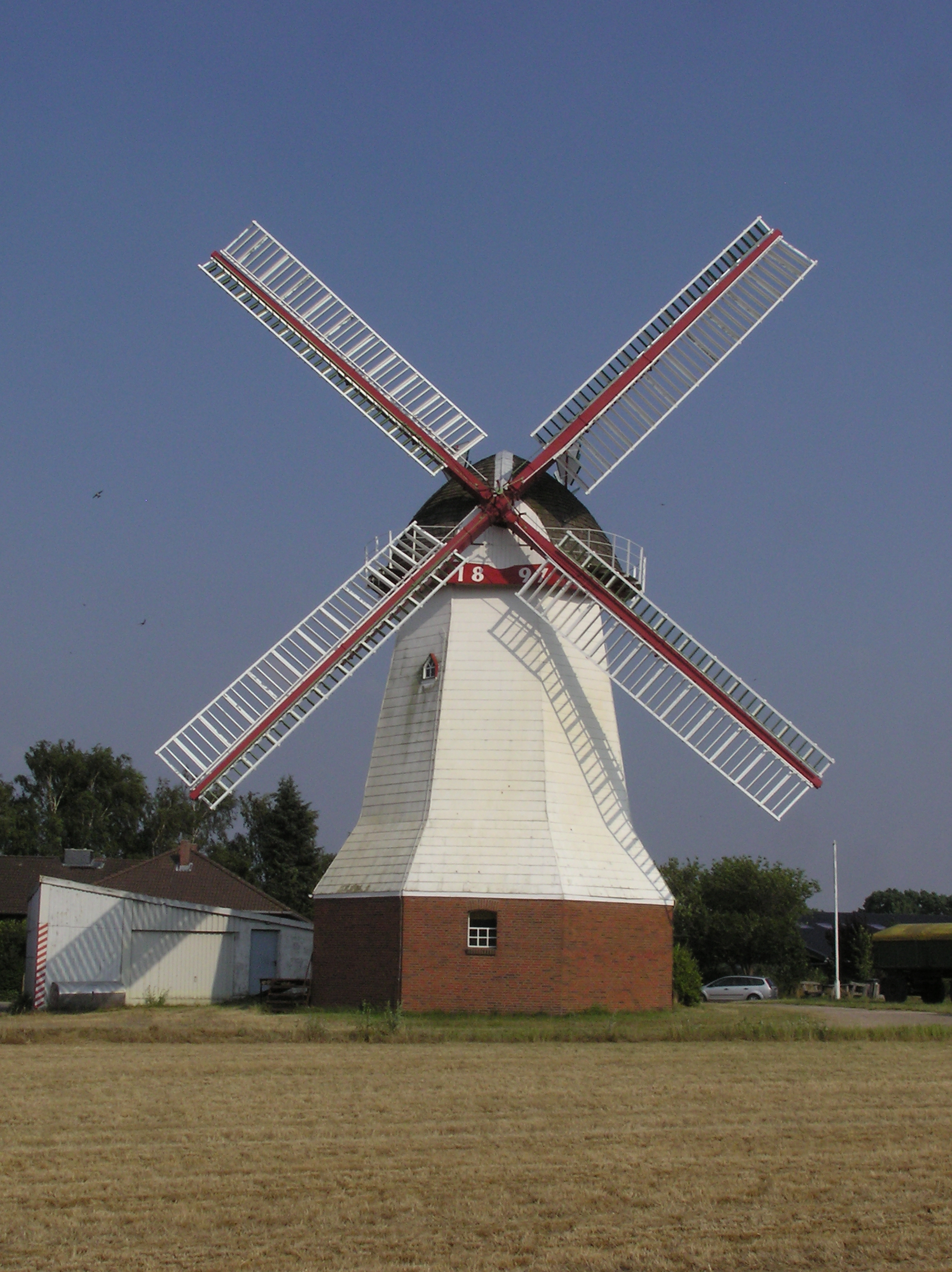
Eyendorf windmill

Lower Saxon Mill Road No. 24

The windmill was erected in 1897 by the mill builder, Bergmann, from Salzhausen. It was built as an Erdholländer with single-storey base, west of Eyendorf on the high geest. In 1911 a diesel engine was installed to boost its power. The mill is fitted with spring sails (Jalousieklappenflügeln) and a double fantail. In 1972 the cap was blown off by a hurricane. The mill was not rebuilt until 1981 by the Society for the Preservation of the Eyendorf Windmill, founded in 1978, so that commercial milling could be continued until the end of the 1980s. In May 1998 a pine sail broke during a mill festival. The sail was replaced that year by a longleaf pine sail but had to be changed again in 2000 by steel rods. The mill is used as a museum and is brought into operation for specific occasions. On the last Saturday in May there is an annual mill festival.

=== Garlstorf windmill (Harburg district) ===
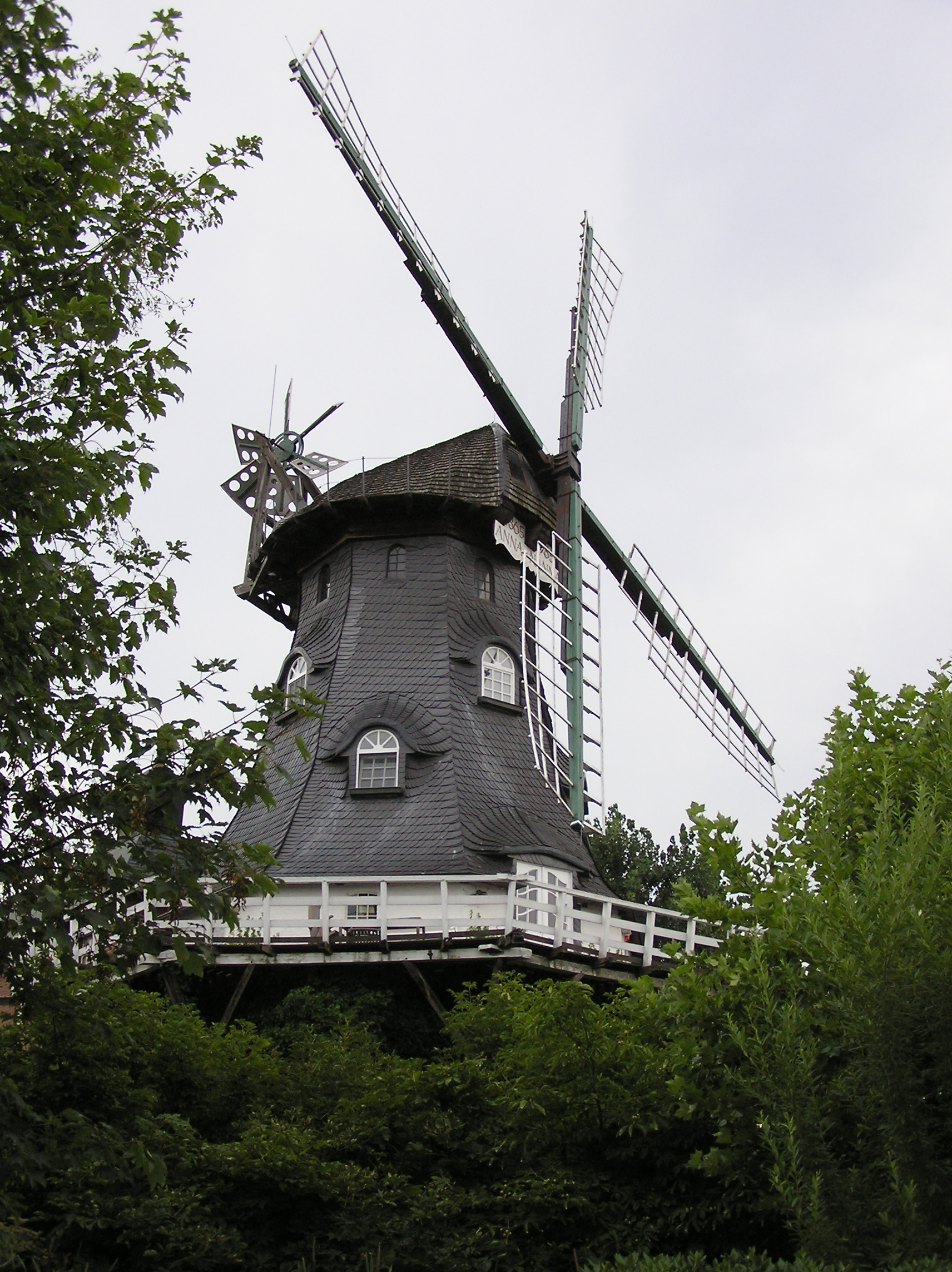
Garlstorf windmill

Lower Saxon Mill Road No. 37

The Garlstorf windmill is a Galerieholländer with a two-storey brick base and a four-storey, very narrow, slate-covered octagonal millhouse. It was erected in 1865 by the Benecke brothers from Kirchgellersen. The waisted shape of the octagonal tower was meant to reduce wind eddies around the sails and so ensure better use of the wind. The mill was initially operated by Herrmann Benecke, but then underwent several changes of ownership. It was bought in 1920 by the mill owner, Heinrich Bornemann, from Luhmühlen, who converted it in 1924 into a motor mill and in 1934 made the millhouse bigger. In 1964 the mill was operated with three rollers and a meal conveyor (Schrotgang). Thereafter it changed hands several times and was gradually closed down and converted into a residence. The internal mill machinery was removed. The present owner has carried out extensive restoration and equipped the mill with sails and a fantail again. Current state of the mill: The cap is covered with wooden shingles and equipped with an additional gallery. Like the four sails it is fixed. The cast iron shaft head (Wellenkopf), which has been drilled through, indicates that originally the mill had spring sails. The breastpiece (Bruststück) and the rods of the present sails are made of multilayered spars held together by steel clamps.
