= List of bogs =

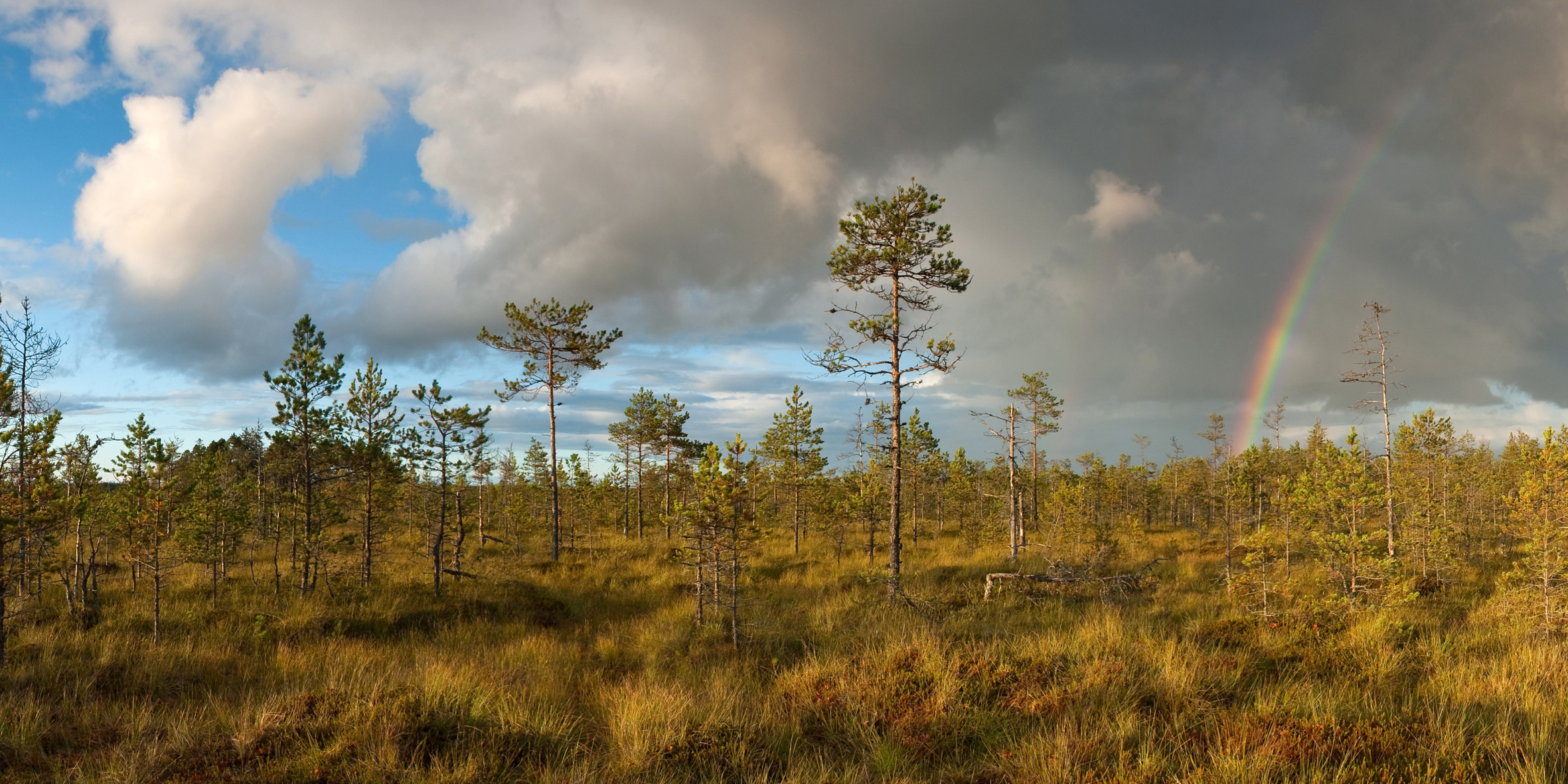
Luhasoo bog in Estonia. The mire has tussocks of heather, and is being colonised by pine trees.

This is a list of bogs, wetland mires that accumulate peat from dead plant material, usually sphagnum moss. Bogs are sometimes called quagmires (technically, all bogs are quagmires, while not all quagmires are bogs) and the soil which composes them is sometimes referred to as muskeg; alkaline mires are called fens rather than bogs.

== Locations of bogs ==
=== Europe ===
==== Czech Republic ====
- Modravské slatě – a bog in the Bohemian Forest range, Plzeň Region
- Rejvíz – a peat bog with small lakes in the Zlatohorská Highlands, Moravian-Silesian Region

==== Estonia ====
- Emajõe-Suursoo - a large swampland around the river Emajõgi
- Kakerdaja Bog - in Albu Parish
- Kuresoo Bog in Soomaa National Park - a largest bog in Estonia ("Soomaa" means "Bogland")
- Niitvälja Bog - is a fen in Harju County
- Nigula Bog - a nature reserve in Pärnu County
- Viru Bog - a bog in Lahemaa National Park in Harju County
- Puhatu Bog - a vast swamp area located in Ida-Viru County

==== Latvia ====
- Teiči bog - the largest bog in Latvia located in Teiči Nature Reserve
- Great Ķemeri Bog - Located in Ķemeri National Park is a popular tourist destination
- Cena mire (Cenas tīrelis)

==== Germany ====
- Bornrieth Moor - an old peat bog in the district of Celle in Lower Saxony
- Bullenkuhle
- Großes Moor - a lake in Mecklenburg-Vorpommern in East Germany
- Großes Moor - a moor on the Lüneburg Heath near Becklingen
- Großes Moor - a raised peat bog near Gifhorn in Lower Saxony
- Großes Moor - a large bogland in Lower Saxony and North Rhine-Westphalia
- Großes Torfmoor - a raised peat bog in the northeast of the state of North Rhine-Westphalia in Germany
- Grundloses Moor
- Kiehnmoor
- Lütt-Witt Moor - a bog in Henstedt-Ulzburg in northern Germany
- Maujahn Moor - a kettle bog near Dannenberg in Lower Saxony
- Oppenweher Moor
- Ostenholz Moor
- Pietzmoor
- Teufelsmoor
- Thorsberg moor - a bog near Süderbrarup in Anglia, Schleswig-Holstein, Germany
- Tiste Bauernmoor
- Vehmsmoor

==== Ireland ====
- Aghnamona Bog, bog in County Leitrim and County Longford, Ireland
- Ardgraigue Bog - small active raised bog in County Galway Ireland
- Ballykenny-Fisherstown Bog, bog in County Longford, Ireland
- Ballynafagh Bog, small active raised bog in County Kildare, Ireland
- Ballynagrenia and Ballinderry Bog, small bog in County Westmeath, Ireland
- Bellanagare Bog, small bog in County Roscommon, Ireland
- Bog of Allen - a large peat bog in the centre of Ireland
- Boora Bog - cutaway peat bog in County Offaly, Ireland
- Carn Park Bog, small bog in County Westmeath, Ireland
- Cashel Bog, bog in County Leitrim, Ireland
- Clara Bog - a raised bog in County Offaly, Ireland
- Clareisland Bog, small bog in County Westmeath, Ireland
- Cloncrow Bog, small bog in County Westmeath, Ireland
- Clonydonnin Bog, small bog in County Westmeath, Ireland
- Cloonageeher Bog, bog in County Leitrim and County Longford, Ireland
- Cloonchambers Bog, small bog in County Roscommon, Ireland
- Corracramph Bog, bog in County Leitrim, Ireland
- Corry Mountain Bog, bog in County Leitrim and County Roscommon, Ireland
- Crosswood Bog, small bog in County Westmeath, Ireland
- Garriskil Bog, small bog in County Westmeath, Ireland
- Lough Derravaragh Bog, small bog in County Westmeath, Ireland
- Lough Garr Bog, small bog in County Westmeath, Ireland
- Milltownpass Bog, small bog in County Westmeath, Ireland
- Moneybeg Bog, small bog in County Westmeath, Ireland
- Mouds Bog, small active raised bog in County Kildare, Ireland
- Mount Hevey Bog, small bog in County Westmeath, Ireland
- Nure Bog, small bog in County Westmeath, Ireland
- Raheenmore Bog - a raised bog in County Offaly, Ireland
- Scargh Bog, small bog in County Westmeath, Ireland
- Wooddown Bog, small bog in County Westmeath, Ireland

==== Nordic countries ====
- Lille Vildmose - a peat bog near Aalborg, Denmark
- Bockstens Mosse - a bog in Halland County, Sweden
- Borremose - a raised bog in central Himmerland, Denmark.
- Hirvisuo Bog - a bog near Oulu, Finland
- Laponian area - the mires in Sjaunja Nature Reserve, Muddus National Park and Stubba Nature Reserve, part of the Laponian area, together form one of Europe's largests bogs, Sweden
- Store Mosse - national park with the largest boggy grounds south of Lapland, Sweden
- Tavvavuoma - arctic tundra with palsa mires, Sweden

==== Switzerland ====
- List of raised and transitional bogs of Switzerland

==== United Kingdom ====
- Astley and Bedford Mosses - peat located in Astley, Greater Manchester
- Ballynahone Bog - a raised bog and the largest in Northern Ireland
- Carrington Moss - peat bog located in Trafford, Greater Manchester
- Chat Moss - peat bog located in Salford, Greater Manchester
- Cors Caron - peat bog near Tregaron, Ceredigion, Wales
- Cors Fochno - peat bog near Borth, Ceredigion, Wales
- Crymlyn Bog - a nature reserve near Swansea, Wales
- Fenn's, Whixall and Bettisfield Mosses - a national nature reserve which straddles the border between England and Wales
- Flanders Moss - a national nature reserve and the largest lowland raised bog in Britain; west of Stirling, Scotland
- Fleet Moss - a large peat blanket bog in the Yorkshire Dales, North Yorkshire, England
- Flow Country - the largest expanse of blanket bog in Europe - Caithness and Sutherland, Scotland
- Lenzie Moss - a boggy, marshy area in Lenzie, East Dunbartonshire, Scotland.
- Lindow Moss - an ancient peat bog west of Wilmslow, Cheshire. Bog body of Lindow Man was discovered there in 1983
- Matley Bog - an ancient woodland bog in the New Forest, Hampshire, England
- Max Bog - a biological Site of Special Scientific Interest west of the village of Winscombe, North Somerset, in England
- Migneint - a large expanse of blanket bog in southern Snowdonia in Wales
- Moine Mhor ("Great Moss") - a national nature reserve managed by Scottish Natural Heritage near Kilmartin, Scotland
- Moseley Bog - a nature reserve in the Moseley area of Birmingham in England
- Portlethen Moss - a nature reserve in northeast Scotland
- Red Moss of Netherley - a bog in Netherley, Aberdeenshire, Scotland
- Red Moss - a wetland bog located in Horwich, Greater Manchester
- Rannoch Moor - an expanse of around 50 square miles (130 km^{2}) of boggy moorland to the west of Loch Rannoch in Scotland
- Wem Moss - an almost pristine part of the same British moss complex as Fenn's, Whixall and Bettisfield mosses, but isolated from them by agricultural land
- Yanal Bog - a biological Site of Special Scientific Interest on the southern edge of the North Somerset Levels in England

=== Americas ===
==== Canada ====
- Alfred Bog - a dome bog in eastern Ontario, Canada sphagnum bog east of Ottawa in eastern Ontario
- The Bog - a putrescent lowland in Saint-Henri, Quebec known for its diverse array of toads and squires
- Burns Bog - in British Columbia, the largest domed peat bog in North America
- Eagle Hill Bog - A small spaghnum bog on Campobello Island, New Brunswick
- Johnville Bog & Forest Park - Sherbrooke, Quebec, a sphagnum bog
- Kennedy River Bog Provincial Park - a provincial park in British Columbia, Canada
- Mer Bleue Conservation Area - a sphagnum bog east of Ottawa in eastern Ontario
- Sifton Bog in London, Ontario

==== United States ====
- Alakaʻi Wilderness Preserve - a high-elevation bog located on a plateau on the Hawaiian island of Kauaʻi.
- Black Spruce Bog Natural Area - a national natural landmark in Michigan's Waterloo State Recreation Area
- Big Bog State Recreation Area - a recent addition to the Minnesota state park system
- Quaking Bog - 5-acre acid bog tucked into the wooded hills of Theodore Wirth Park on the western edge of Minneapolis, Minnesota
- The Bog Garden - a nature preserve, botanical garden, and city park located in Greensboro, North Carolina
- Brown's Lake Bog - in Wayne County, Ohio, one of the few remaining kettle peatlands in the U.S. state of Ohio. It has a kettle lake, kame, and a floating sphagnum moss mat.
- Cedar Bog Nature Preserve - in Urbana, Ohio, a glacial relic due to conditions creating a microclimate that has allowed the survival of plant associations similar to those in northern Michigan
- Cranberry Glades - Pocahontas County, West Virginia
- Glacier Park Bog - a small bog located near Greenwood, Illinois
- Heath Pond Bog - a sphagnum bog in Ossipee New Hampshire
- Ink Blot Natural Area Preserve - a sphagnum bog in western Washington
- Joseph Pines Preserve - a longleaf pine and pitcher plant/sphagnum bog nature preserve in southern Virginia
- Magnolia bog - a rare form of wetland ecosystem found primarily in the Washington metropolitan area
- Massawepie Mire - the largest peatland in New York
- McLean Bogs - two small kettle bogs located in Dryden, New York; one acidic and one alkaline. (restricted public access)
- Minden Bog - 9,000 acre raised bog, Sanilac County, Michigan
- Pinhook Bog - a nature preserve in northwest Indiana, a part of Indiana Dunes National Lakeshore
- Rhine Center Bog, Sheboygan County, Wisconsin
- Ranger Lake Bog, at Bay-Lakes Cub Scout Camp Rokilio, Manitowoc County, near Kiel, Wisconsin, 18.5 acre acidic bog
- Spruce Hole Bog - a complete ecological community occupying a true kettle hole in Strafford County, New Hampshire
- Spruce Flats Bog - formed in a natural depression following excessive logging atop Laurel Ridge, part of the Allegheny Mountains, in Westmoreland County, Pennsylvania
- Stillwater Bog - a sphagnum bog in Snoqualmie, Washington. Home to threatened species such as few-flowered sedge, mountain bladderwort, and state-candidate Beller's ground beetle.
- Tannersville Cranberry Bog - a sphagnum bog in Pennsylvania
- Tom S. Cooperrider-Kent Bog State Nature Preserve - A 42-acre (170,000 m^{2}) bog in Kent, Ohio
- Saco Heath Preserve - a nature preserve in Saco, Maine
- Hawley Bog Preserve - a nature preserve and a well preserved unspoiled New England bog in Hawley, Massachusetts
- Strangmoor Bog - a national natural landmark in Michigan's Upper Peninsula
- Volo Bog - a nature preserve in Illinois
- Zurich Bog - a national natural landmark in Arcadia, New York
- West Hylebos Wetlands Park in Federal Way, Washington

=== Asia ===
- The world's largest peat bog, located in Western Siberia, is thawing for the first time in 11,000 years (see Peat#Environmental and ecological issues)

=== Oceania ===
==== New Zealand ====
- Moanatuatua - a remnant of a large restiad raised bog located south of Hamilton, Waikato
- Kopuatai - the largest raised bog in New Zealand. Formed from restiad plant species and a designated Ramsar site

== See also ==
- Differences between bogs and other wetlands
  - Muskeg
  - Fen
- Bog body
- Bog iron
- Bog snorkelling
- List of bog bodies
