= Klaus Grote =

German archaeologist

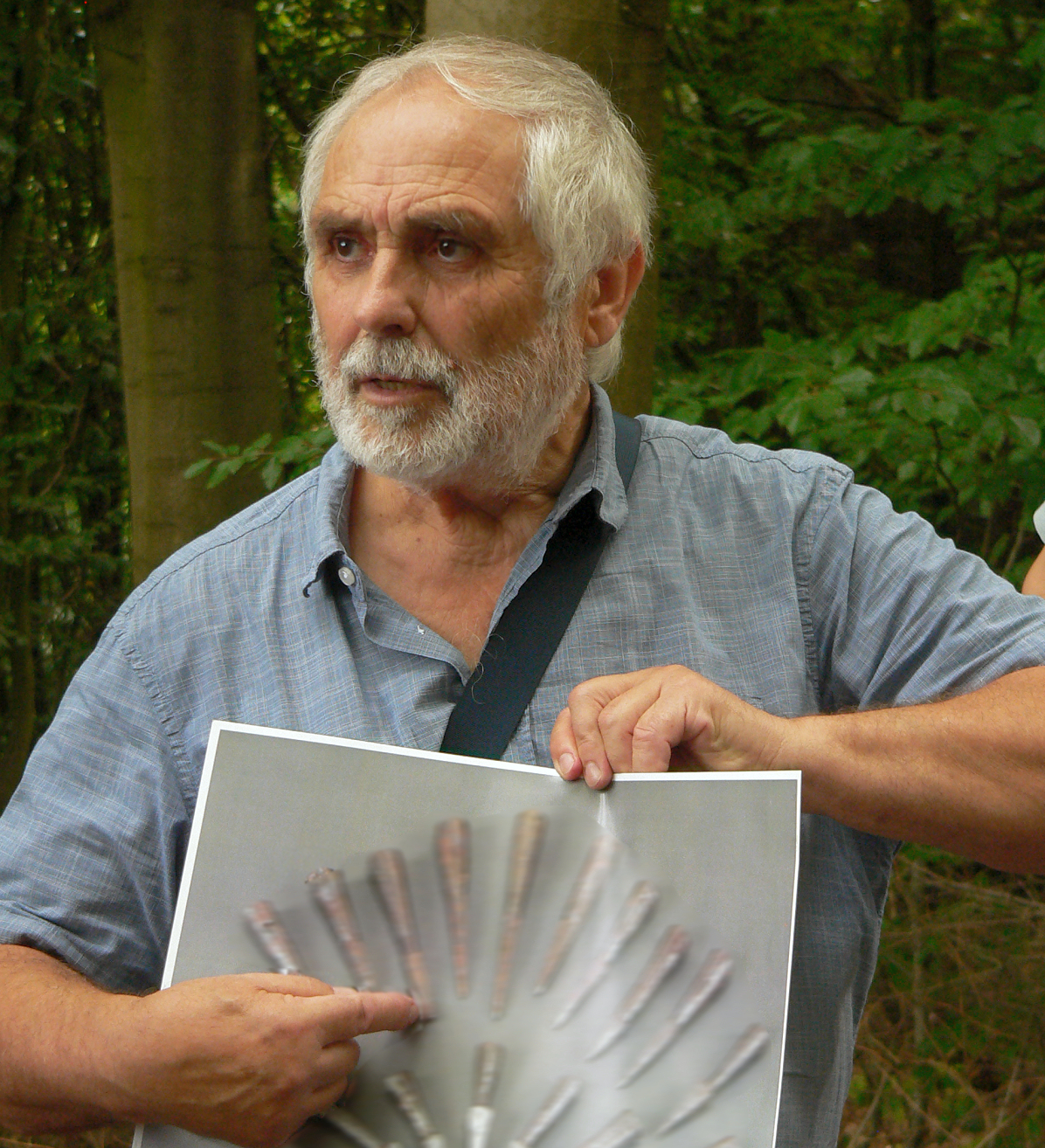
Image of Klaus Grote

Klaus Grote (born 12 September 1947) is a German archaeologist and was director of the archaeological section of the Landkreis Göttingen until his retirement in 2012.

Grote studied archaeology [pre- and proto-history] at Göttingen University, writing his master's thesis on the Mesolithic in the southern Lower Saxony hill country. His doctorate from Hamburg University on prehistoric settlement usage of the abris in the Buntsandsteingebiet near Göttingen was completed in 1994.

He worked at the Niedersächsischen Institut für Denkmalpflege (Archäologie) in Hannover from 1977 to 1979. Since 1979 he has been the archaeologist for Göttingen county [Landkreis].

In 1997 Grote was given the sponsorship award of the Dr. Helmut und Hannelore Greve Stiftung für Wissenschaften und Kultur.

In 1998 Grote surprised the German archaeological community by demonstrating the presence of a Roman camp in Hedemünden, farther north-east than any previously known Roman presence. Other significant work, all in southern Lower Saxony, has been the extensive surveying and excavations around Seeburger See, including a motte-and-bailey and a refuge fort in Bernshausen, and Medieval abandoned villages.

== Selected publications ==
- K. Grote and H. D. Freese, "Die Felsschutzdächer im südniedersächsischen Bergland," NNU 51, 1982, 17-70.
- with Sven Schütte (eds.): Führer zu archäologischen Denkmälern in Deutschland. Vol. 17: Stadt und Landkreis Göttingen. Stuttgart 1988
- K. Grote, Urgeschichtlich besiedelte Felsdächer (Abris) In: 10 Jahre Kreisarchäologie Göttingen (Braunschweig 1989) 8-11.
- K. Grote, "Die Bundsandsteinabris im südniedersächsischen Bergland," Die Kunde N.F. 39, 1988, 1-43.
- K. Grote, Die Abris im südlichen Leinebergland bei Göttingen. Archäologische Befunde zum Leben unter Felsschutzdächern. Vol. 1-3 (Oldenburg 1994). (Dissertation)
- K. Grote, "Neue Aspekte zu Burgen des Frühmittelalters in Südniedersachsen," Südniedersachsen 3, 1995, S. 73–79.
- K. Grote, "Zum Leben unter Felsschutzdächern. Jäger und Sammler in Südniedersachsen am Ende der letzten Eiszeit," in: EisZeit Katalog zur Ausstellung (Hildesheim, Stuttgart 1999).
- K. Grote, Bernshausen [Bonn 2003].
- K. Grote, "Stützpunkt der römischen Expansionspolitik. Das Römerlager bei Hedemünden an der Werra. Ein Vorbericht," Göttinger Jahrbuch 52 (2004), pp. 5–12.
- K. Grote, "Römer an der Werra. Das Militärlager bei Hedemünden im südlichen Niedersachsen," Archäologie in Niedersachsen 8, 2005, pp. 113–117.
- K. Grote, Römerlager Hedemünden. Mündener Heimat- und Geschichtsverein Sydekum. [Hann. Münden 2005]. ISBN 3-925451-358
- K. Grote, "Das Römerlager im Werratal bei Hedemünden (Ldkr. Göttingen). Ein neuentdeckter Stützpunkt der augusteischen Okkupationsvorstöße im rechtsrheinischen Germanien," Germania 84, 2006, pp. 27–59.
