= Johnville =

Johnville may refer to:

- Johnville, New Brunswick, a community in Canada
- Johnville, or Jeanville, a rural area in the townland of Grange Lower, County Kilkenny, Ireland

== See also ==
- Johnville Bog & Forest Park
- Johnville F.C. (disambiguation)
