= Großes Moor =

Großes Moor (German for "Great Bog" or "Great Moor") may refer to:

Bogs or moorland areas in Germany

- Großes Moor (near Becklingen), a nature reserve near Bergen, Celle county, Lower Saxony
- Großes Moor (near Wistedt), a nature reserve near Tostedt, Harburg county, Lower Saxony
- Großes Moor (Vechta-Diepholz), on either side of the boundary between the counties of Vechta, Diepholz and Osnabrück, Lower Saxony
- Großes Moor (Uchte), near Uchte, Nienburg/Weser county, Lower Saxony
- Großes Moor (near Gifhorn), near Neudorf-Platendorf, Gifhorn county, Lower Saxony
- Großes Moor near Hausen (Rhön), Rhön-Grabfeld county, Bavaria
- Großes Moor near Dätgen, Rendsburg-Eckernförde county, Schleswig-Holstein
- Großes Torfmoor, bei Hille, Minden-Lübbecke county, North Rhine-Westphalia
- a former name of the heath moor or Rendswühren Moor near Rendswühren, Schleswig-Holstein

Other meanings

- Großes Moor (lake), a lake in the municipality of Hohenfelde, Mecklenburg-Western Pomerania, Germany
- Altstadt (Schwerin), the oldest residential area in the Old Town of the Mecklenburg-Western Pomeranian capital of Schwerin

== See also ==
- de:Großes Moor, a disambiguation page in German Wikipedia
