= Bullenkuhle =

Pond in Germany

Coordinates: 52°48′47″N 10°31′01″E

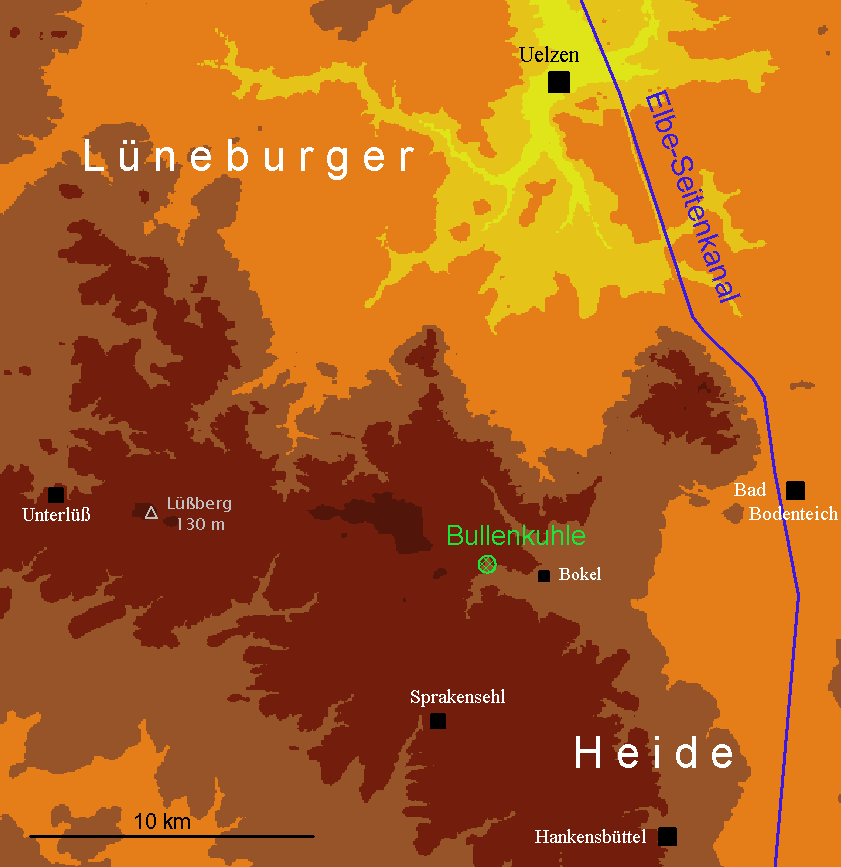
Location of the Bullenkuhle and geomorphological profile of the area

The Bullenkuhle is a predominantly marshy lake in the extreme north of the district of Gifhorn in the north German state of Lower Saxony. This strange biotope and geotope has been formed into a natural hollow in the terrain that is termed a sinkhole. The area is environmentally protected.

== Location ==
The Bullenkuhle lies about 15 kilometres south of the town of Uelzen and a good kilometre west of the village of Bokel (in the municipality of Sprakensehl) at the edge of a large pine forest at a height of about 95 metres (312 ft) above NN. A stream emerges in the immediate vicinity which is initially called the Bokeler Bach and, later, becomes the Aue and finally, after combining with other streams, becomes an Elbe tributary, the River Ilmenau. The area belongs to the southeast fringes of the Hohen Heide in the centre of the Lüneburg Heath. This landscape formed from end and ground moraines and periglacial sediments was created geomorphologically mainly by the edges of the ice sheet during the later phases of the Saalian glaciation, i.e. during the so-called Drenthe II stage and the final glacial advance of the Warthe stage. The crests of the undulating ridges of end moraines are usually covered with pine forests growing on sandy soils; the ground moraines were used for agriculture. The typical open heath landscape of the Lüneburg Heath - which arose anthropogenically through overexploitation of forests, burning, plaggen cutting and grazing - only exists today in fragments in the area around the Bullenkuhle. The macroclimate of the Lüneburg Heath is maritime temperate.

== Formation of the sinkhole ==
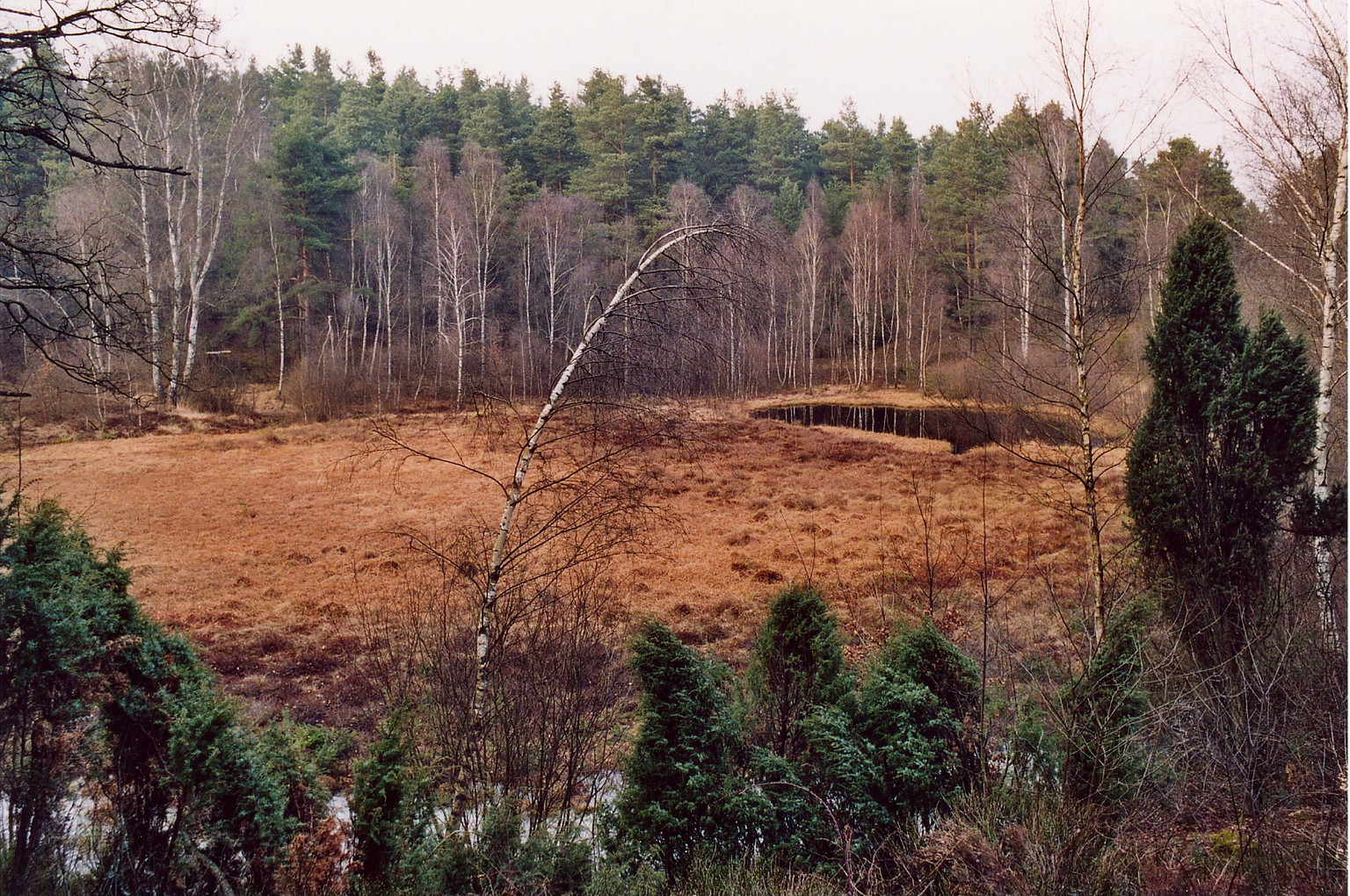
The Bullenkuhle in early spring. A bog pond can be seen in the background

In north Germany there are numerous salt domes under the ground – relicts of the Zechstein Sea from the Permian period, which were later relocated and deformed tectonically. When rock salt comes into contact with ground water it leaches away; i.e. the salt is absorbed by the water and transported off. This can lead to the development of large caverns that finally cave in. Sometimes such an event at a depth of several hundred metres can result in the ground collapsing right up to the surface. This results in prominent, often steep-sided and deep hollows called sinkholes or dolines (although dolines can have other morphogenetic causes, particularly in karst regions). Many of these funnel-shaped hollows remain dry, in others water collects that can later become marshy. Sinkholes are geologically often very recent; it is not uncommon for them to be only a few thousand years old and many hollows only date back a few hundred years.

Examples of sinkhole lakes and marshes include very large lakes like the Arendsee and the Zwischenahner Meer – both at least 500 hectares in area – the Seeburger See, the Sager Meer in Oldenburg district, the Rudower See in Westprignitz district or the "bottomless marsh" (Grundloses Moor) in Soltau-Fallingbostel district and Maujahn in Lüchow-Dannenberg district. The Bullenkuhle belongs to this group, albeit considerably smaller. This sinkhole has a diameter of about 130 metres (430 ft) and attains a depth of 15 metres (49 ft). Exactly when the Bullenkuhle was formed is not known. This would need a stratigraphic investigation and pollen analysis of the vertical profile of the sinkhole (see Maujahn Moor).

== Description ==
The visitor to the Bullenkuhle comes across a basin-shaped hollow with steep sides of 30 to 60° in places. At the foot of the slopes of glacial sands is a marsh covering about 0.5 hectares (1.2 acres) that on closer inspection turns out to be a 'quaking bog' (Schwingrasen or Schwingmoor) - a floating mat of moss and other plants, under which there is presumably no homogeneous layer of peat, but at least in places just a body of water. The floating mat covers at least 80% of the wetland or marsh, only in the northeast is there stretch of open water about 0.1 hectares (0.25 acres) in area and several metres deep; a so-called bog pond. With an electrolytic conductivity of 24 μS/cm this wetland is very oligotrophic, it is rich in humus and, with a pH value of 5.0, moderately acidic. It is populated by typical marsh plants like peat mosses, bladderworts and the rare Dwarf White Water Lily (Nymphaea candida). In addition to peat mosses, the floating mat pressing in on the bog pond consists mainly of Hare's-tail Cottongrass, Cross-leaved Heath, Common Heather and Crowberry; as well as White Beak-sedge and Cranberry. The largely unwooded terrain can be described as flat to slightly rounded intermediate marsh (Zwischenmoor). On its periphery is a ring-shaped bog, which is slightly better supplied with nutrients from precipitation running down the slopes than the centre of the marsh. Bottle Sedge reeds thrive particularly well here.

The slopes of the funnel-shaped terrain are covered with low vegetation such as Common Heather, Bilberry, and Cranberry, and also with Purple Moor Grass and trees. The latter include several very large and old Juniper bushes and trees, especially conspicuous and typical of the terrain. Other varieties include birch trees, Buckthorn bushes and pines. The animal world is also noteworthy and some species are peculiar to marsh biotopes. In particular there are up to eight species of amphibian as well as adders.

== Literature ==
- J. Delfs: Die Bullenkuhle. In: Naturschutzgebiete im Raum Gifhorn-Wolfsburg. 1986
- R. Pott: Lüneburger Heide. Exkursionsführer Kulturlandschaften, Ulmer-Verlag, Stuttgart 1999, ISBN 3-8001-3515-9
- R. Tüxen: Die Bullenkuhle bei Bokel. Abhandl. naturwiss. Ver., Bremen 1958, 35/2: 374-394
- Ernst Andreas Friedrich: Naturdenkmale Niedersachsens. Hannover, 1980. ISBN 3-7842-0227-6
- Eberhard Rohde: Die Sage von der Bullenkuhle in: Sagen und Märchen aus dem Raum Gifhorn-Wolfsburg, Gifhorn, 1994 ASIN B005IC0SAW
