= Puhatu Wetland Complex =

Wetland complex in Estonia

- Location within Estonia
- Location: Estonia
- Coordinates: 59°10′34″N 27°43′14″E
- Area: 57,079 ha (141,050 acres)
- Established: 2010

Ramsar Wetland
- Designated: 2011
- Reference no.: 1999

Puhatu Wetland Complex (Estonian: Puhatu soostik) is a bog in Ida-Viru County, Estonia. The bog extends from northern bank of Lake Peipus to Auvere-Narva line. It is part of Estonia's largest mire system Agusalu-Puhatu. The complex is protected (Puhatu Nature Reserve, Agusalu Nature Reserve).

The area of the bog is 57,079 ha.

== See also ==
- Agusalu Nature Reserve
- Puhatu Nature Reserve
