= Seeburg, Lower Saxony =

Seeburg
- Municipality
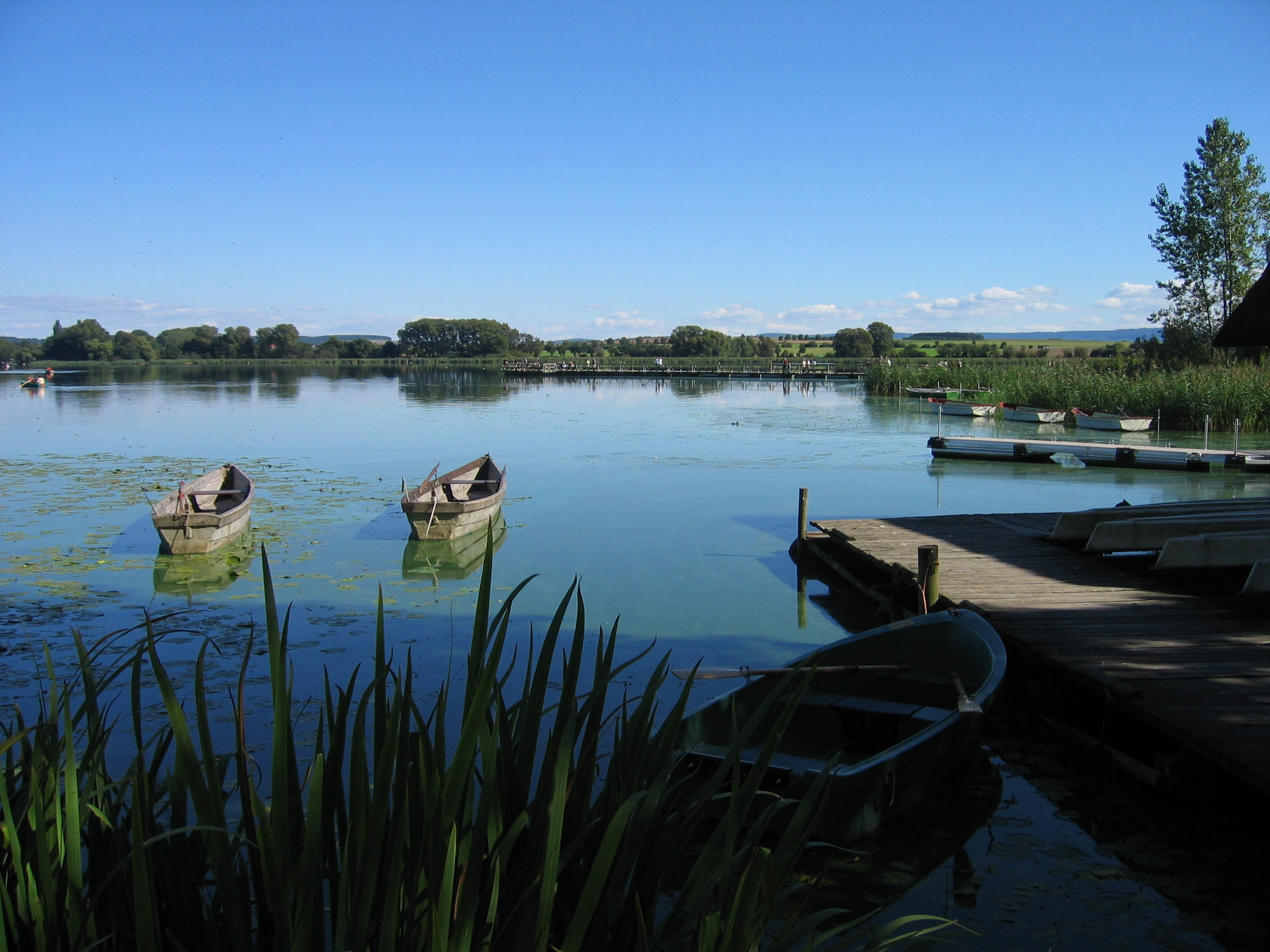
- Seeburger See

- Flag Coat of arms

- Location of Seeburg within Göttingen district
- Interactive map of Seeburg
- Location within Germany Location within Lower Saxony
- Coordinates: 51°34′N 10°09′E
- Country: Germany
- State: Lower Saxony
- District: Göttingen
- Municipal assoc.: Radolfshausen

Government
  - Mayor: Martin Bereszynski

Area
  - Total: 13.44 km^{2} (5.19 sq mi)
- Elevation: 155 m (509 ft)

Population (2025-12-31)
  - Total: 1,624
  - Density: 120.8/km^{2} (313.0/sq mi)
- Time zone: UTC+01:00 (CET)
  - Summer (DST): UTC+02:00 (CEST)
- Postal codes: 37136
- Dialling codes: 05507
- Vehicle registration: GÖ
- Website: www.seeburgersee.de

Seeburg (German pronunciation: [ˈzeːbʊʁk]) is a municipality in the district of Göttingen, in Lower Saxony, Germany. It contains two villages, Seeburg and Bernshausen. It lies at the Seeburger See and is part of the Eichsfeld.

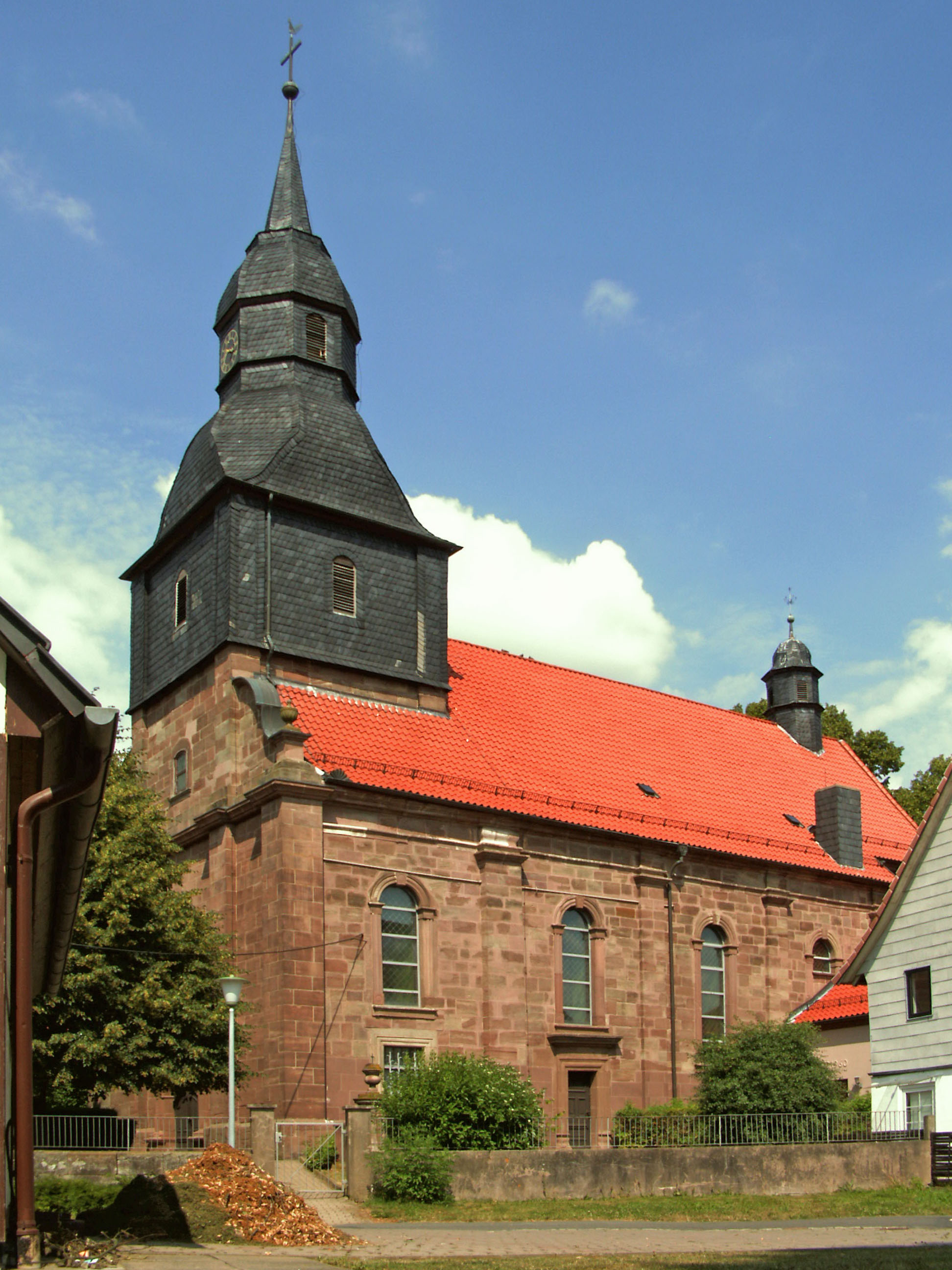
The Catholic Church
