= Cloonchambers Bog =

Ecological site in County Roscommon, Ireland

- Portach Chluain Sheamhar
- Location within Ireland
- Location: County Roscommon, Ireland
- Nearest city: Castlerea, County Roscommon
- Coordinates: 53°49′38″N 8°26′11″W
- Area: 348.25 hectares (860.5 acres)
- Governing body: National Parks and Wildlife Service

The Cloonchambers (Irish: Portach Chluain Sheamhair) Special Area of Conservation (or SAC) is a Natura 2000 site based close to the town of Castlerea in County Roscommon, Ireland. The qualifying interests by which it is protected as an SAC are the presence of three habitat types: the presence of active raised bogs (priority habitat), the presence of degraded raised bogs still capable of natural regeneration, and the presence of depressions on peat substrates of Rhynchosporion vegetation.

== Location ==
The Cloonchambers Bog SAC is located 6 kilometers to the west of Castlerea, County Roscommon, in the townlands of Cloonchambers, Cloonconra (Electoral District (E.D.) Coolougher), Cloonkeen (E.D. Coolougher), Cloonsuck and Leveelick. Schedule 1 of the Statutory Instrument for this site identifies it as encompassing an area of 348.25 hectares.

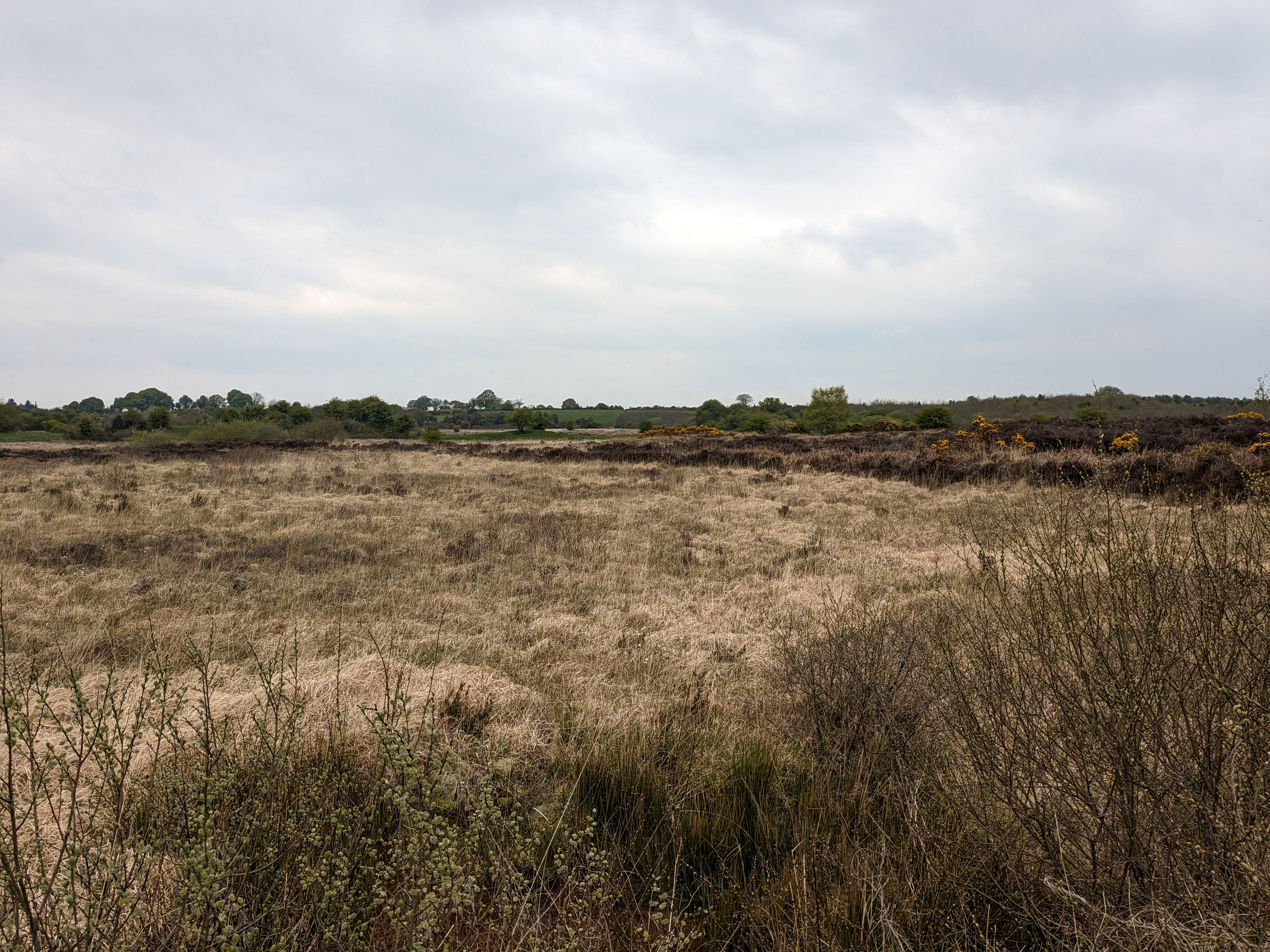
Cloonchambers Bog, Co Roscommon

== SAC qualification ==
Ireland has a legal obligation to designate a range of habitats and species under the European Union Habitats Directive 92/43/EEC and the Irish regulations which implement this Directive (European Communities (Birds and Natural Habitats) Regulations 2011 (S.I. No. 477 of 2011). Ireland has designated an area of approximately 13,500 km^{2} as SACs to date, including land, lakes and marine habitats. The Irish National Parks and Wildlife Service (NPWS) investigates, designates and advises on such SACs and other protected sites. Details of the Cloonchambers Bog SAC can be found on their website. The Cloonchambers Bog site was proposed as a Site of Community Importance in November 1997, and was designated as a Natura 2000 site under the Habitats Directive. Statutory Instrument No. 389 of 2022, establishing the site as an SAC (Site code: 000600), was passed in 2022. The three ecologically significant features which qualify this site for designation as a Special Area of Conservation are the presence of specific protected habitat types. These three habitats are:

- Active raised bogs (Natura 2000 code 7110; Annex 1 priority habitat)
- Degraded raised bogs still capable of natural regeneration (Natura 2000 code 7120)
- Rhynchosporion vegetation/Depressions on peat substrates of the Rhynchosporion (Natura 2000 code 7150).

=== SAC site description ===
Cloonchambers Bog SAC comprises two elongated peat-filled basins, separated by grassy, fen vegetation. This strip of vegetation occurs at locations where the thinner peat mixes with mineral soil. The bog includes 7.66 hectares of active raised bog, 21.09 hectares of degraded raised bog and 0.3638 hectares of Rhynchosporion vegetation. The site includes three habitat types for conservation, including one priority habitat. The National Parks and Wildlife Service site synopsis for this Special Area of Conservation notes that:

”Cloonchambers Bog is of high conservation value as it is a good example of a western raised bog that contains areas of active raised bog, degraded raised bog and Rhynchosporion vegetation. The presence of an extensive flushed fen area on the high bog surface is a very rare feature of Irish raised bogs and is thus of considerable ecological and eco-hydrological interest. Of particular botanical interest is the presence of Vaccinium vitis-idea, a rare plant species usually associated with montane heath habitats in the west and north of Ireland”.

=== Active raised bog ===
Active raised bog is a priority habitat protected under the Habitats Directive. It includes wet, actively peat-forming high bog, with a high proportion of Sphagnum moss species (the term ‘high bog’ refers to the area of intact deep peat: the remains of the original raised bog. It also should include some or all of these features: hummocks, pools, wet flats, Sphagnum lawns, flushes and soaks. At this Special Area of Conservation, the active raised bog is well-developed but to be found in only a relatively small, wet part of the high bog surface. The active raised bog area includes several small pool systems. The flora in this habitat includes Bog Asphodel (Narthecium ossifragum), Bogbean (Menyanthes trifoliata), bog moss (Sphagnum cuspidatum) Common Cottongrass (Eriophorum angustifolium), and White Beak-sedge (Rhynchospora alba). This area also includes Rhynchosporion vegetation.

=== Degraded raised bog ===
Degraded raised bog corresponds to those areas of high bog whose hydrology has been adversely affected by peat cutting, drainage and other land use activities, but which are capable of regeneration. In habitats with this classification (Natura code 7120), peat is not currently forming, but natural peat regeneration is still possible. This constitutes the majority of the uncut high bog area. There has been peripheral drainage and burning at the site, so the degraded bog area is relatively dry. As a result, the vegetation consists of mixtures of Carnation Sedge (Carex panicea) and/or Bog Asphodel (Narthecium ossifragum). Other plant species occurring here include Cross-leaved Heath (Erica tetralix), Deergrass and the cottongrasses Eriophorum angustifolium and Eriophorum vaginatum, and Heather (Calluna vulgaris). Plants such as Purple Moor-grass (Molinia caerulea) and Bog-myrtle (Myrica gale) can be found in the flushed areas. These areas are typically sloping with shallow peat cover. Sparse Sphagnum cover is a characteristic of degraded areas of bogs, and in this case, Sphagnum typically covers less than 30% of the area. The steep slopes of the bog have resulted in many erosion channels and gullies in the degraded area. Between the peat basins, the flora includes species such as Common Reed (Phragmites australis), Greater Tussock-sedge (Carex paniculata), Purple Moor-grass and Bog-myrtle.

To the north-east of Cloonchambers Bog, a woodland, including species such as Sessile Oak (Quercus petraea) and Rowan (Sorbus aucuparia), has grown up on dry ridges. In this area of the bog, Cowberry (Vaccinum vitis-idaea) occurs – this species is uncommon in Ireland. The flora also includes Honeysuckle (Lonicera periclymenum) and Ivy (Hedera helix)

=== Rhynchosporion vegetation ===
The Cloonchambers bog site includes a third habitat to be conserved: Depressions on peat substrates of the Rhynchosporion (Natura code 7150). This habitat, including the plant species White Beak-sedge (Rhynchospora alba), Brown Beak-sedge (Rhynchospora fusca), with some of the characteristic species Bog Asphodel (Narthecium ossifragum), sundews (Drosera spp.), Deergrass and Carnation Sedge (Carex panicea), occurs in wet depressions, pool edges and erosion channels.

=== Protected species ===
The Marsh Fritillary butterfly (Euphydryas aurinia), a Habitats Directive Annex II species has previously been recorded from Cloonchambers Bog SAC. The site in its current state is considered to be only “marginally suitable” for this butterfly species, with no permanent populations likely. It is expected that the suitability will reduce further with natural and human-induced changes.

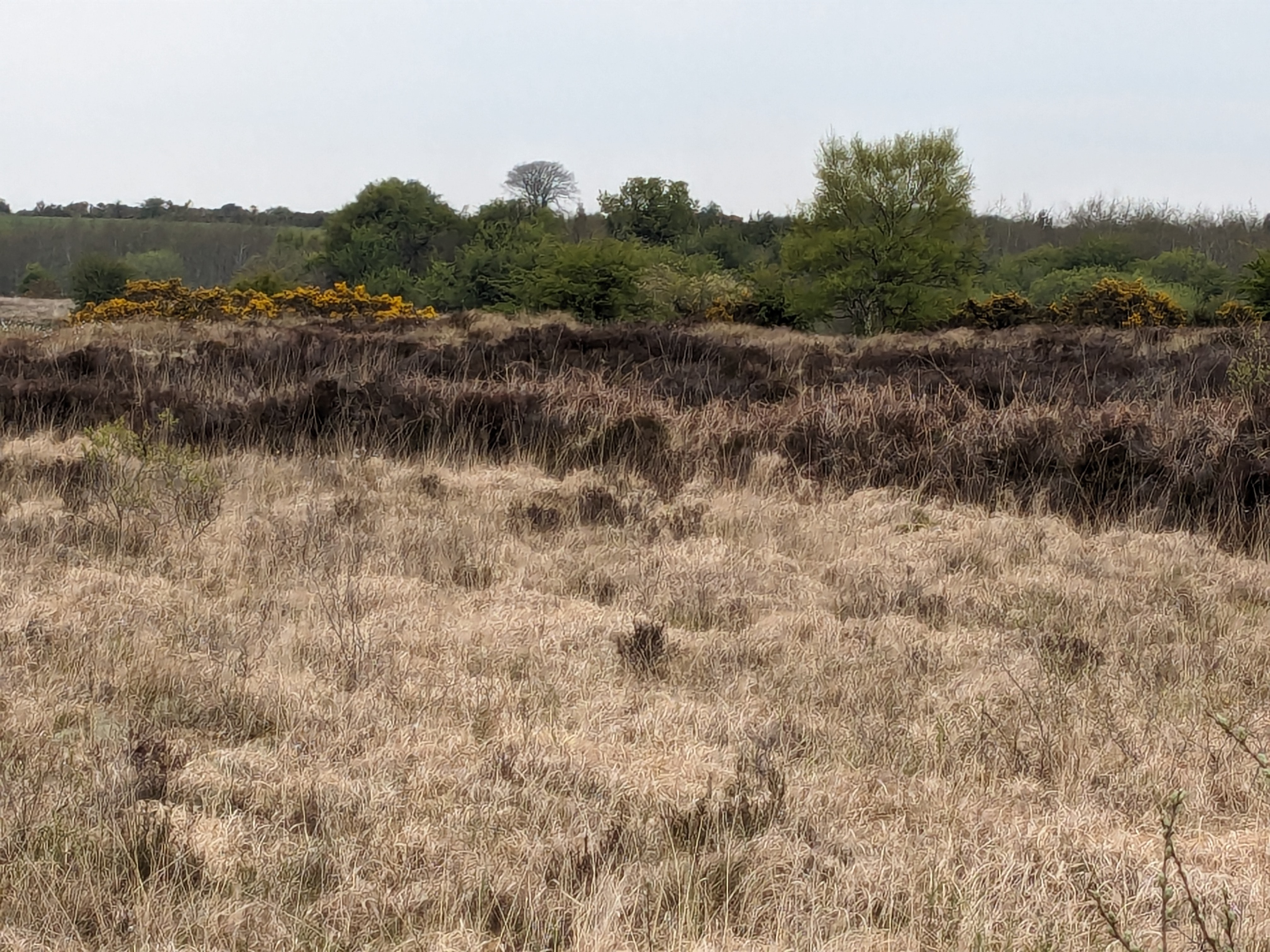
Cloonchambers Bog, Co. Roscommon 3

== Conservation objectives ==
Under Article 6(1) of the Habitats Directive, countries are required to set site-specific conservation objectives to maintain and restore the protected habitats. The conservation objectives for Cloonchambers Bog are available from the NPWS website. In 2012, the area of active raised bog was mapped at 7.7 hectares, with 42.2 hectares of degraded raised bog on the high bog. It was estimated that 21.1 hectares of the site could be restored by drain blocking, allowing for 28.8 hectares of potential active raised bog to be restored. A further 3.3 hectares of cutover bog was thought to be restorable also.

The long-term objective for the size of the active raised bog was set as 32.1 hectares. The area of high bog at the site was measured as 195.8 hectares in 2012, and the conservation objective requires that there should be no decline in the extent of high bog necessary to maintain the active raised bog habitat.

It is noted in the conservation objectives that the effects of previous drainage and peat-cutting activities have threatened the active raised bog area at the margins of the bog, and no natural marginal habitats occur at the margins. The transitional areas between the high bog and adjacent mineral soils (including the cutover areas) must be restored to support the active raised bog. The objectives also set out a target of 16.1 hectares (or at least 50% of the active raised bog habitat) to be restored to high quality central ecotope, active flush, soaks, bog and/or woodland. Targets have been set for vegetation composition, air and water quality and percentage cover of Sphagnum, invasive species and negative indicator species. Separate conservation objectives for the two non-priority habitats have not been set, as the objectives for these two habitats are intrinsically linked with the objectives for the raised bog habitat.

In 2023, the NPWS published version 2 of the Cloonchambers Bog Raised Bog Restoration Plan. In the restoration plan, the measures considered to achieve the site-specific conservation objectives include:

- Drain blocking (includes drains on both high bog and the margins)
- Removal of forestry/tree clearance
- Installation of marginal dams
- High bog excavation/re-profiling
- Inoculation with Sphagnum species
- Bunding on high bog or cutover bog.

A drainage management plan has been designed for the site. The network of functional drains on the site negatively affects the hydrology of the site and the action plan describes how these should be blocked. The restoration plan stated that progress had been limited at the time of publication and that further preparatory work would be carried out after progress is achieved on other active raised bogs.

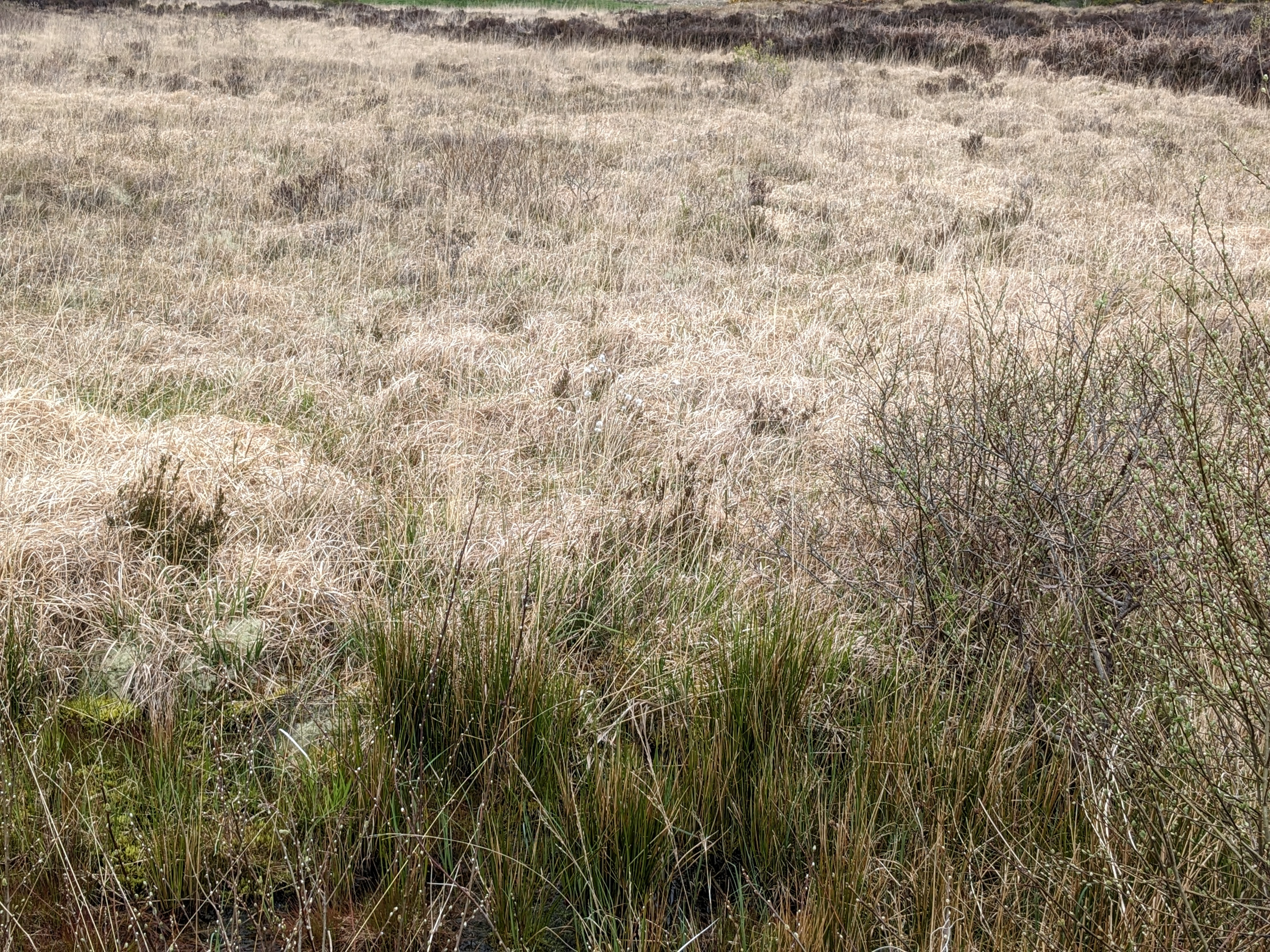
Cloonchambers Bog, Co. Roscommon 4

== Conservation threats ==
Two known conservation threats to the Cloonchambers Bog SAC are peat-cutting, drainage and burning.

=== Burning ===
The NPWS restoration plan notes that a large proportion of the high bog habitat is considered in a dry state due to the effects of burning, resulting in the dominance of mixtures of either Carex panicea and/or Narthecium ossifragum. The plan document also notes that "No recent fire events have been reported at Cloonchambers Bog; however, the bog has been damaged on several occasions through burning".

=== Peat-cutting ===
The Cloonchambers Bog SAC site synopsis records that, due to drainage issues relating to the cutting of peat, and to burning, much of the high bog has poor structure. The synopsis notes that the cutting of peat has mainly been discontinued. However, this appears to be inconsistent with findings from a subsequent investigation.

In 1999, the state granted a derogation for this and other peatland sites. This derogation ended in 2008, given the ongoing damage to the sites (at a rate of 2-4% per annum). At the time, these sites had been candidate SACs rather than fully designated SACs. A compensation scheme was implemented for those affected by the cessation of peat-cutting at this and other SAC and Natural Heritage Area (NHA) sites. The options available to people with turf-cutting rights on these sites included:

- Annual Payment Scheme (A payment of €1,500 per annum (index linked) for 15 years together with a once-off incentive payment of €500) further to the signing of a legal agreement with the Minister.

or

- Bog Relocation Scheme (where feasible, qualifying applicants will be facilitated in relocating to non-designated sites to continue turf cutting)

An interim arrangement was made available to those who opted for the Bog Relocation Scheme while they awaited the investigation and preparation of alternative peat-cutting sites. This arrangement was to receive the Annual Payment Scheme, or to receive an annual supply of 15 tonnes of cut turf delivered to their homes. In December 2019, the Minister for Culture, Heritage and the Gaeltacht noted in Dáil Éireann (the lower house of the Irish legislature) that 21 applicants to the Turf Cutting Cessation Scheme for Cloonchambers Bog were regularly receiving annual payments and that 1 applicant who regularly received annual payments had applied for relocation.

Data on the Cessation of Turf Cutting Compensation Scheme Statistics for SACs dataset indicates that there had been 33 applications for the compensation scheme for Cloonchambers Bog, of which 7 applicants requested relocation. There were 18 legal agreement payments recorded. No turf deliveries were made to any applicants in year 1 and 2 of the scheme, and 18 applicants received payment, whereas in years 3–6, 15 applicants received payments. An investigation into peat-cutting on SAC sites carried out in 2022 showed that this activity occurred to various levels at the active raised bog at Cloonchambers Bog SAC between 2012 and 2021. In 2012, 16 plots were cut, increasing to 27 plots in 2019 and decreasing to 22 plots cut in 2021.

The issue of peat-cutting at Cloonchambers Bog SAC and other SACs recognised by the European Union is of international importance. After issuing a letter of formal notice and an additional reasoned opinion to Ireland in 2011, the European Commission referred Ireland to the Court of Justice of the European Union in March 2024, for failure to apply the Habitats Directive to protect sites designated for raised bog and blanket bog habitats from peat-cutting.

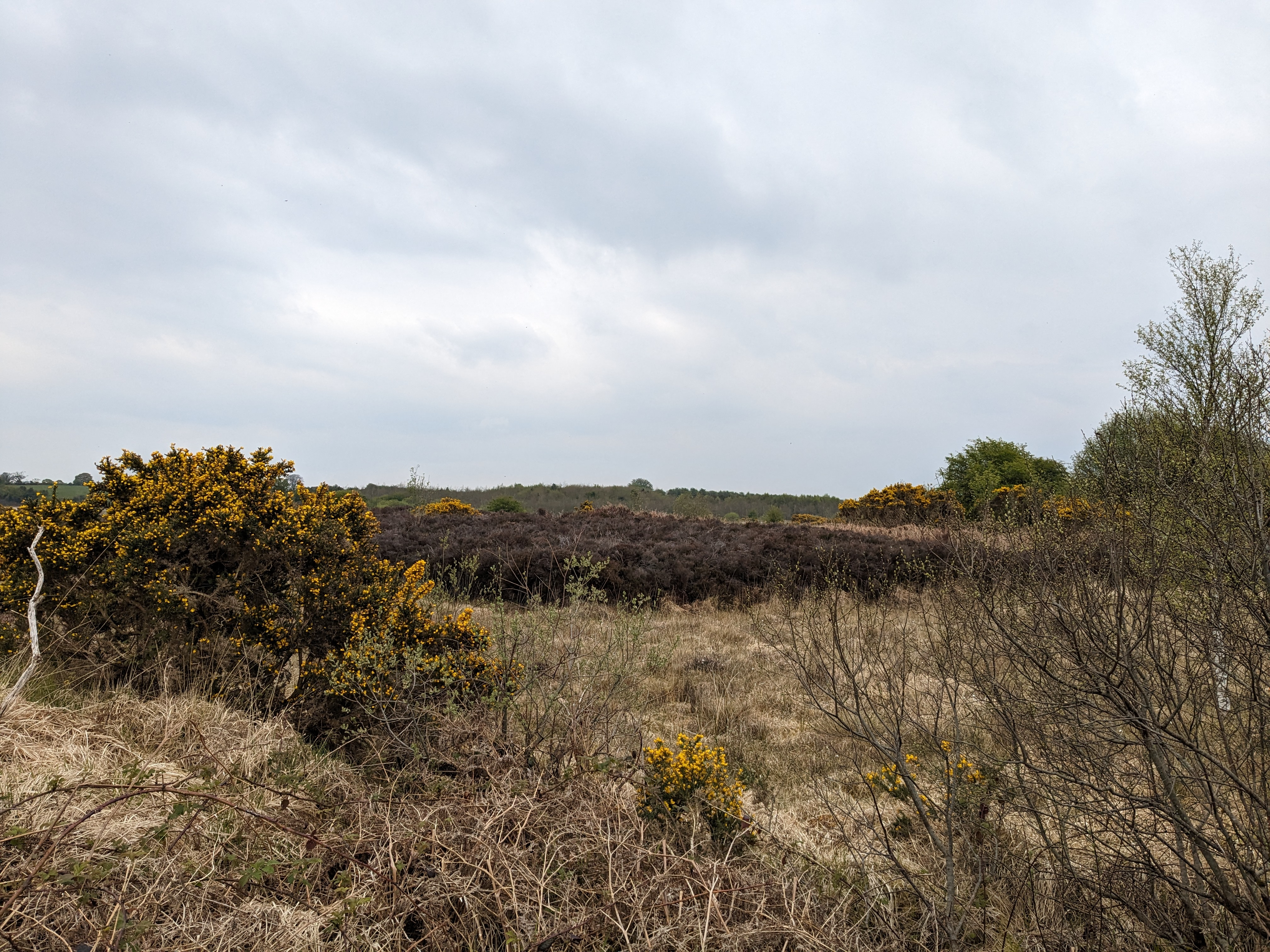
Cloonchambers Bog, Co. Roscommon 2

=== Drainage issues ===
The restoration plan records that "Due to the effects of peripheral drainage and burning, most of the high bog habitat is in a rather dry state and thus the vegetation is dominated by varying mixtures of either Carex panicea and/or Narthecium ossifragum".

== See also ==
- List of bogs
- List of Special Areas of Conservation in the Republic of Ireland
