= Maujahn Moor =

Coordinates: 53°05′39″N 11°02′35″E

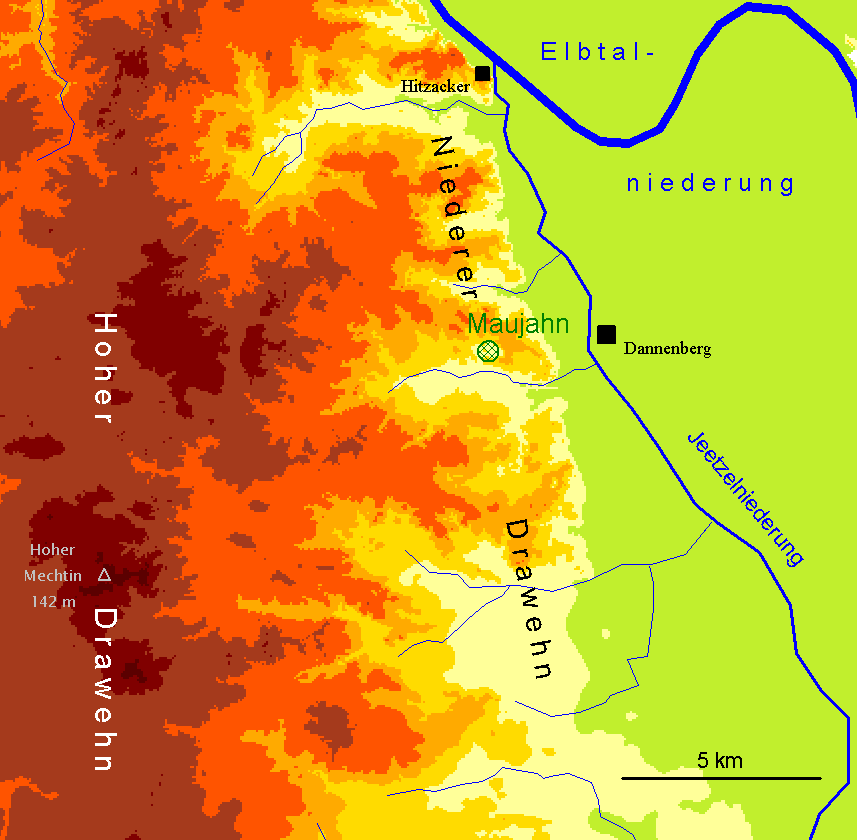
Location of the Maujahn and geomorphological profile of the surrounding area

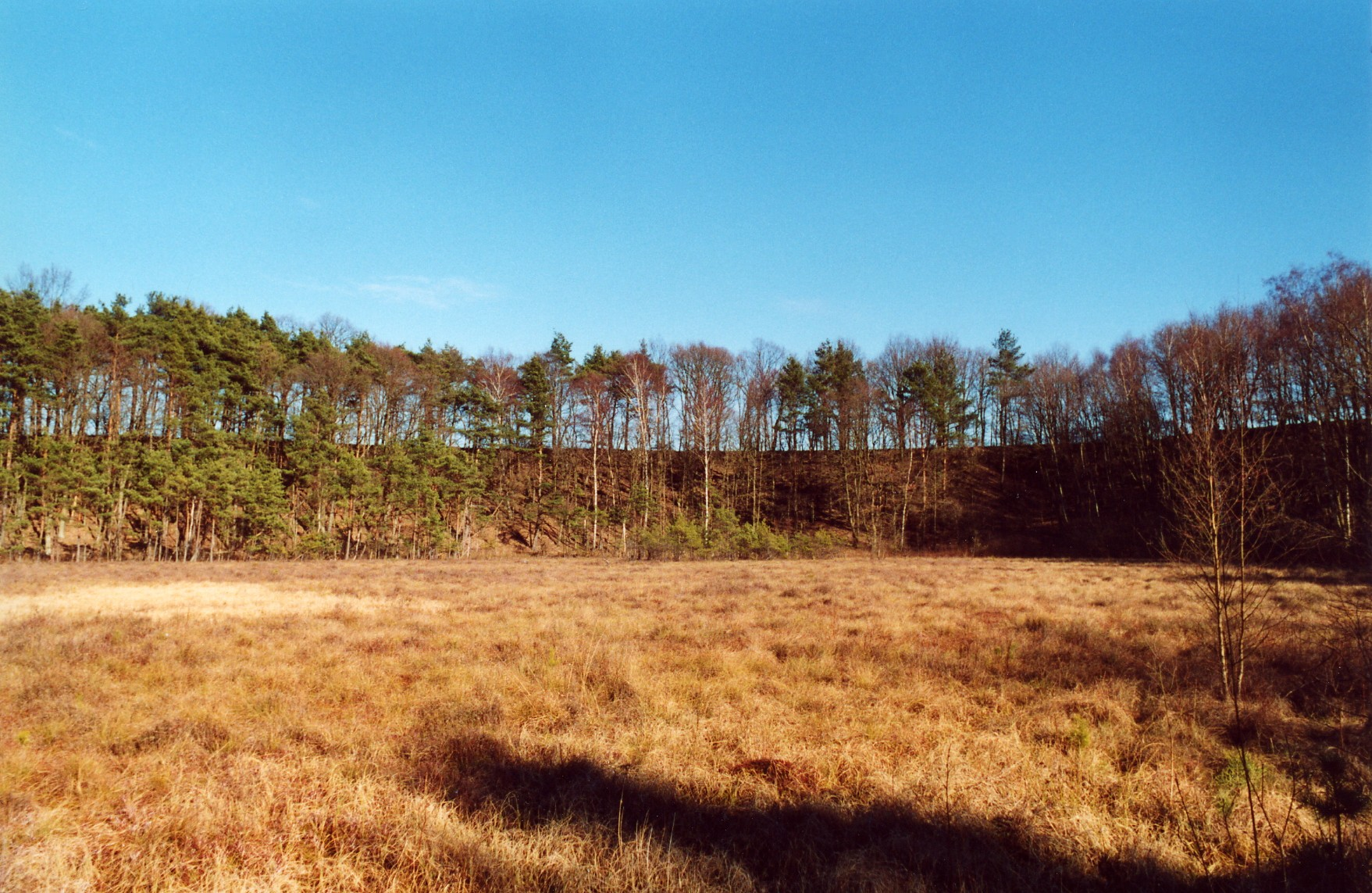
The Maujahn in early spring; between the trees in the background the upper edge of the sinkhole sides

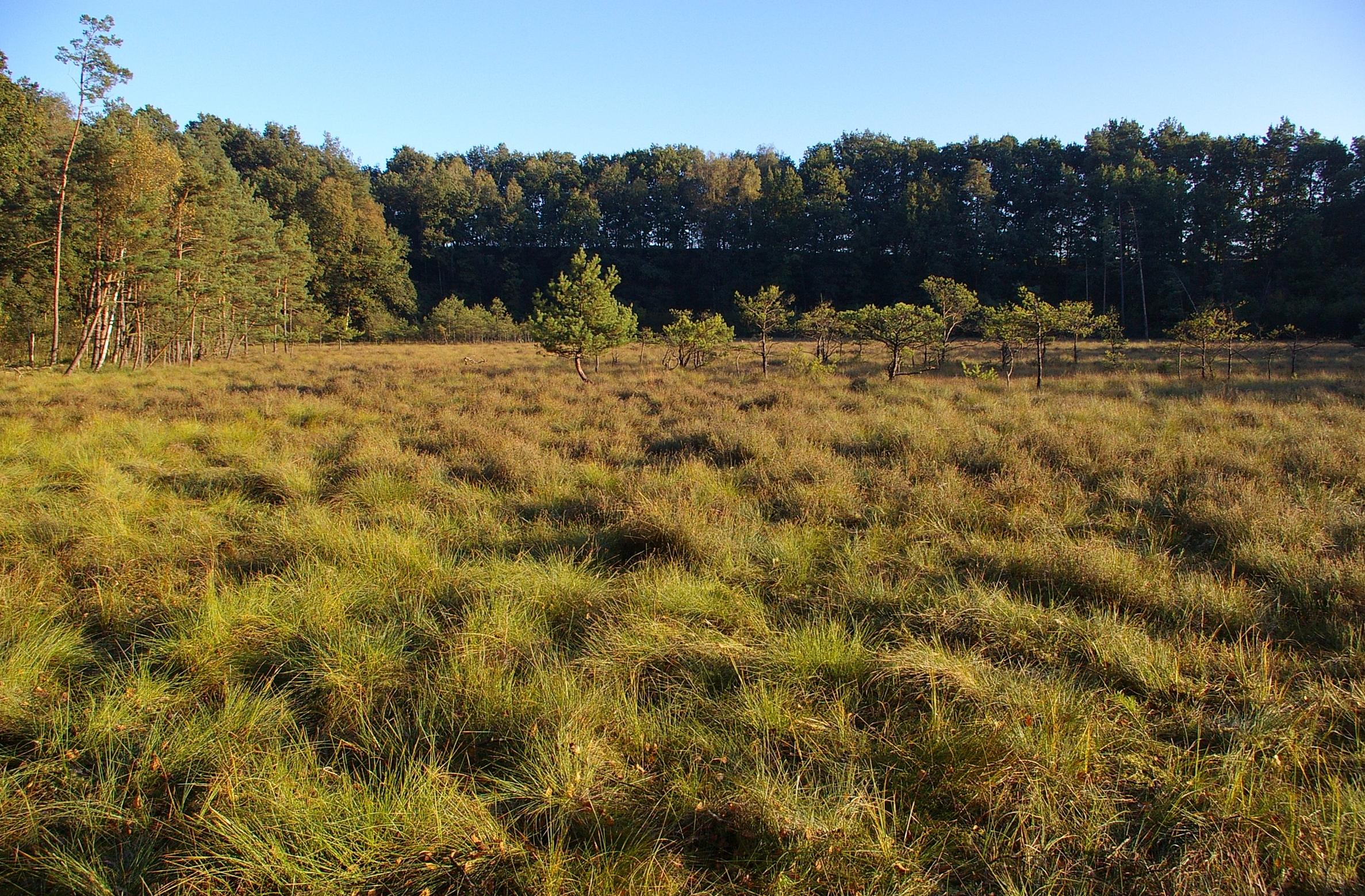
Dwarf pines, which are nevertheless probably very old, grow in the middle of the moor

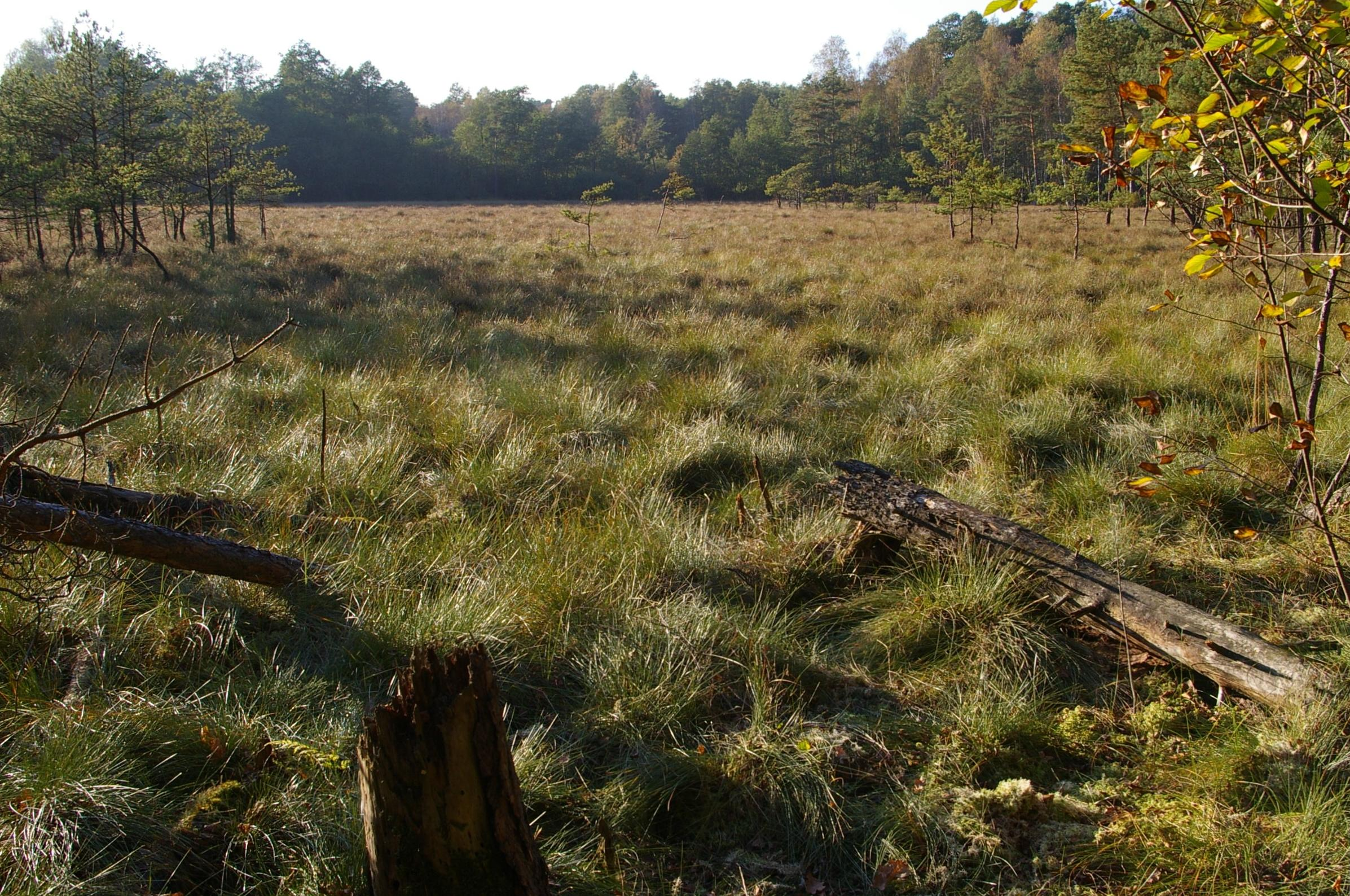
The largely treeless bog surface is dominated by Tussock Cottongrass

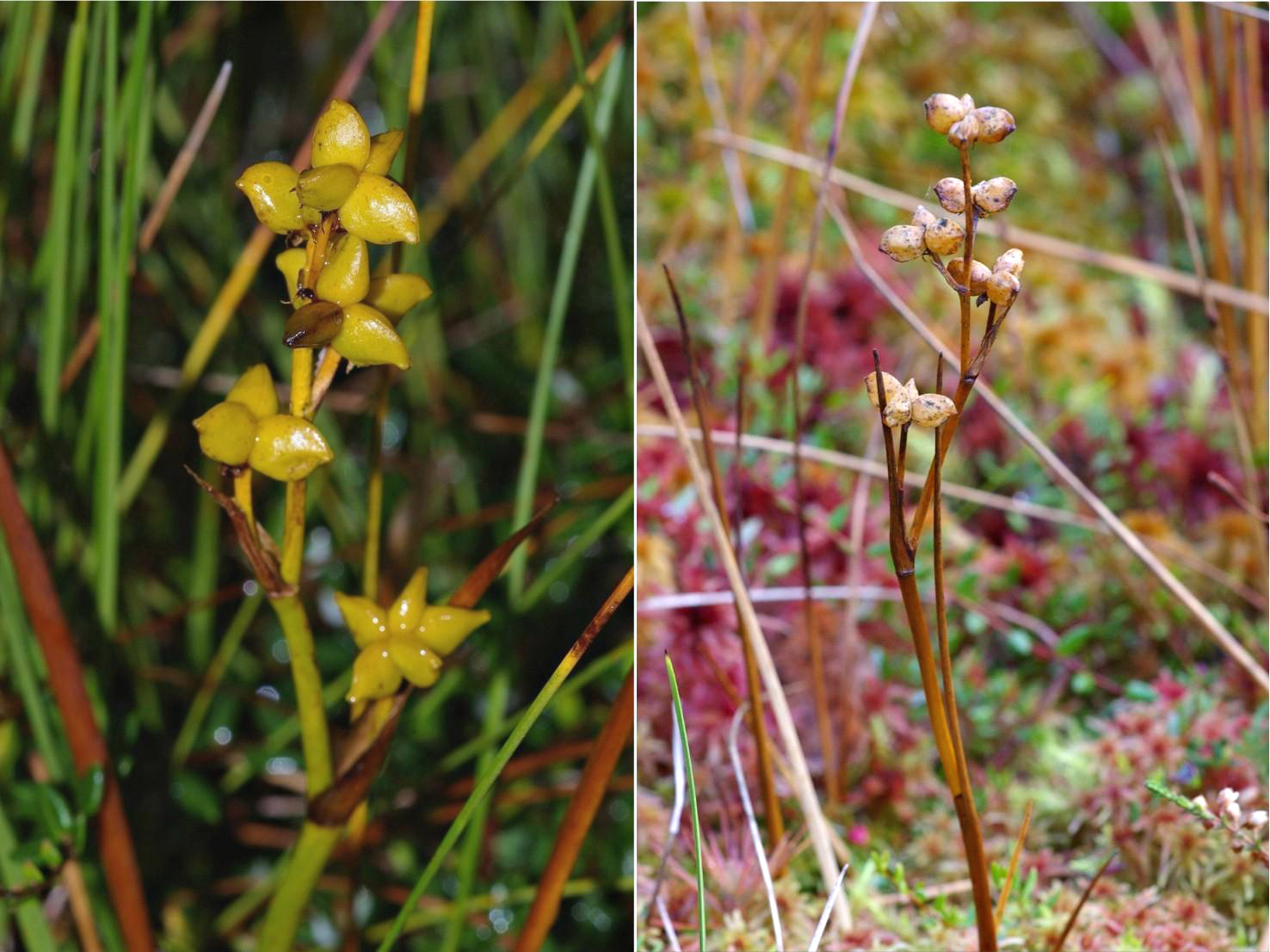
The Rannoch-rush is a rarity

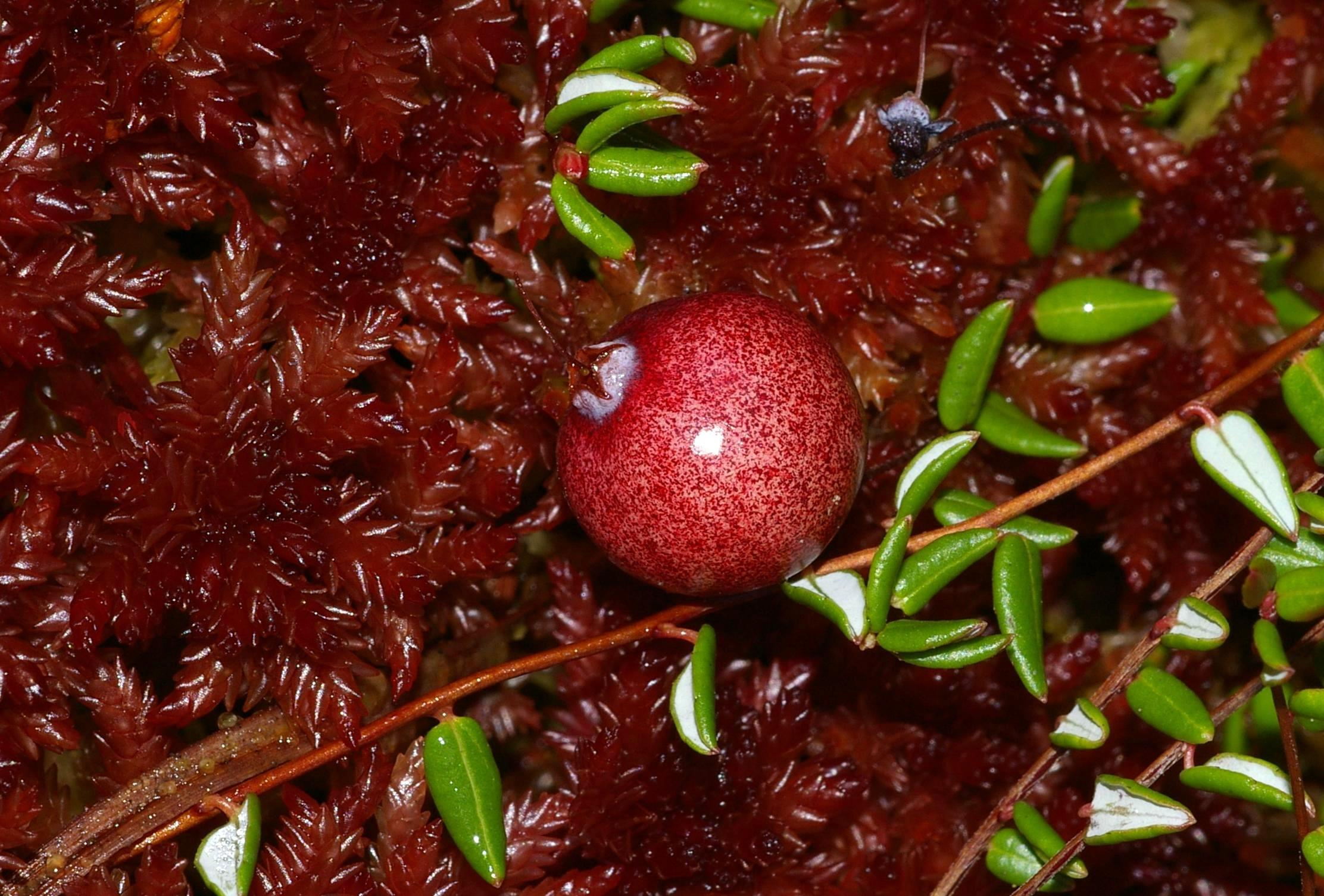
Fruit of the cranberry with red peat moss

The Maujahn or Maujahn Moor (also known colloquially in German as the Maujahnskuhle) is a kettle bog in North Germany which began as a sinkhole. It is located a good two kilometres west of the town of Dannenberg between the villages of Thunpadel and Schmarsau in northeastern Lower Saxony.

== Location ==
The bog is located on the eastern border of the D28 Lüneburg Heath natural region, within the Lower Drawehn, the transition to the D29 Wendland and Altmark natural region. Culturally, the Drawehn is usually associated with the Wendland. The Maujahn Moor is protected from the Atlantic macroclimate of Lower Saxony by the presence of the eastern slopes of the East Hanoverian end moraines (also known as the Göhrde-Drawehn Hills) formed during the Saalian glaciation and the climate is therefore clearly sub-continental. The surface of the moor lies 25 metres above sea level; the geest hillocks surrounding it reach heights of just above 50 metres. The most exposed point in the High Drawehn - is the Hoher Mechtin which climbs to 142 metres above sea level - is 10 kilometres away.

== Description ==
This terrain hollow was formed about 7000 years ago as a result of the collapse of a salt dome that was leached by underground groundwater action - exactly as happened to the Bullenkuhle in the district of Gifhorn. Thanks to stratigraphic research of the bog carried out by Lesemann (1969), we know that, initially, a carr with a covering of peat moss developed on the valley bottom. About 500 years ago there was clearly another collapse which resulted in the creation of two larger sinkholes. These dolines filled with water, the peat moss layer rose and covered the surface of the lake. Today this enclosed, floating layer of grass and peat has a thickness of between 2.5 and 4 metres and is capable of load-bearing. Underneath the eastern sinkhole is a body of water and mud up to 16 metres deep. Even above ground the terrain shows the characteristic relief of a sinkhole: the eastern bog hollow is semi-circular and surrounded by steep walls up to 15 metres high, covered with oak and pine.

The rounded, oval, more or less treeless surface of the bog in the eastern sinkhole covers about 2 hectares (4.9 acres) and is classified as a 'living', i.e. growing, mesotrophic transition moor (Zwischenmoor or Übergangsmoor). It has vegetation typical of a raised bog however. In addition to various peat mosses, certain types of cottongrass characterise its appearance, particularly (Hare's-tail and Common Cottongrass); other typical species are the Common cranberry, Bog-rosemary, Cross-leaved heath and Common heather, various sedges, White beak-sedge (Rhynchospora alba) and the rare Rannoch-rush (Scheuchzeria palustris).

On the periphery is a strip of carr which is dominated by Grey Willow and Alder Buckthorn bushes as well as Downy Birch. In places Bog-bean and Bog Arum may also be found in the undergrowth. The western part of this waterlogged terrain is more fen-like (Niedermoor), with reed beds and tall herbaceous vegetation as well as birch and alder trees. Information about the fauna of the region may be found in the book by Timm (1983).

Unlike the normal situation with these transition moors, the raised centre of the moor body, currently only a few decimetres high, is thought to be at its climatic climax. Any further succession into a true raised bog - with its surface bulging noticeably in the middle, from which the groundwater has fully retreated and which is only fed by rainwater, is not expected. This may be put down to its orographic situation, particularly the kettle hole formation, as well as the very low annual precipitation in the area of well under 600 millimetres per year. This makes the region very different from the Atlantic and sub-Atlantic raised bogs of western and central Lower Saxony.

No information is available about the derivation of the name Maujahn, however it may have Slavic roots, like the Drawehn.

== Threats and conservation ==
Like the majority of the few still remaining raised and transition bogs in North Germany, the Maujahn is threatened by drainage and changes in nutrient levels.

The quality of this valuable biotope is at risk because the surface of the moor dries out from time to time, causing a mineralisation of the peat layer and encouraging the settlement of trees (downy birch, alder, pine, willow). This threatens to oust the highly specialised, moorland flora and fauna that only thrive in isolated spots. The reason for this intermittent loss of water is that there have been some particularly dry years (for example 2003: 435 mm/a in Lüchow) and the fact that drainage of the hollow southwest into Prissersche Bach valley by a ditch has not been fully prevented. Periodic clearance work by nature conservationists has enabled the invading trees to be removed from the surface of the bog.

In addition the diffusion of nutrients from agriculture in the area (Abdrift) and atmospheric pollution (i.e. the deposition and mobilisation of nitrogen), particularly in central Europe, is a problem. This leads to the unnatural fertilisation of the oligotrophic to mesotrophic moor and alters the mix of plant communities.

- Visitors should note that the moor is out of bounds due to its sensitive quaking bog surface. Its vegetation is very sensitive to being trodden on; in addition there is a danger of falling through the surface in places.

Due to its regional landscape uniqueness as a biotope and geotope and its importance as a habitat for numerous rare, plants and animals, the Maujahn has been declared a nature reserve (area: 37 hectares (91 acres)). The area was also designated by the EU Commission in Brüssel as a Special Area of Conservation as part of the European conservation project Natura 2000.

== The legend of Maujahn ==
Unsurprisingly, there are also legends about how the Maujahn was formed. These stories have been passed down the generations in various forms. This version was told by Miss Ungewitter, a teacher at Dannenberg Primary School (around 1970).

Not far from the village of Thunpadel is a hollow in the ground, called Maujahn. Legend has it that at this spot there was once a high hill on which a castle stood, and in which there lived a knight of the heath with many armed servants. He was feared far and wide for his robberies. From the heights of his castle he could survey the roads round about from above. Many merchants were robbed and dragged off into the castle. They only regained their freedom in return for a high ransom.

One day the heath knight appeared before Count Adalbert on the moor. The count was shocked, but received him in friendly fashion. Great was his dismay, however, when the knight asked him for the hand of his daughter, the beautiful Agnes. Fearing revenge, Count Adalbert assented. The wedding was fixed for Midsummer's Day. How disconsolate was the lovely Agnes! Day and night she prayed to God, to prevent her becoming the wife of the robber baron. She promised in return to build a monastery.

The nearer the day of the wedding came, the heavier was her heart. On Midsummer's Day the bride was with her family in the church at Dannenberg awaiting the groom, the heath knight. But that morning the knight had seen a train of wares coming along the road and wanted to seize it and bring it to the castle. His chief adviser urged him not to do this on his wedding day. He rejected the advice with the words: "Beautiful Agnes can wait, the little dove won't fly away!"

When he was underway, a heavy storm arose, so that one of his servants begged him to turn back. With the words: "Now may your god be merciful" he slew him with his sword. At once there was a brilliant flash of lightning and a loud thunderclap! Everyone lay prostrate as if they were dead. When the servants came to their senses again, the heath knight had disappeared. They hurried to the castle. But that had gone too. On the site of the castle, before which they stood, was a deep hole. God had punished the ungodly heath knight.

When news of the demise of the knight reached the church, everyone was joyful, especially the beautiful Agnes. She did as she had promised God and had the Abbey of St. George built near Dannenberg. Right across the land, the people were glad that the heath knight was dead. Out of gratitude they built a large stone with the inscription: "Do not sin, you people; God will not be mocked."

== Sources ==
- B. Lesemann: Pollenanalytische Untersuchungen zur Vegetationsgeschichte of the Hannoverschen Wendlandes. Flora (Abt. B), Morph. Geobot., 1969, 158: 480-518
- T. Timm: Faunistische Charakterisierung and Bewertung of the subkontinentalen Maujahn Moores in NE-Lower Saxony. Abh. naturwiss. Ver., Hamburg 1983, (NF) 25: 169-186
- R. Tüxen: The Maujahn. Veröff. Geobot. Inst., Zürich 1962, 37: 267-301
