= Kuresoo Bog =

Bog in Estonia

Coordinates: 58°29′56″N 25°09′08″E

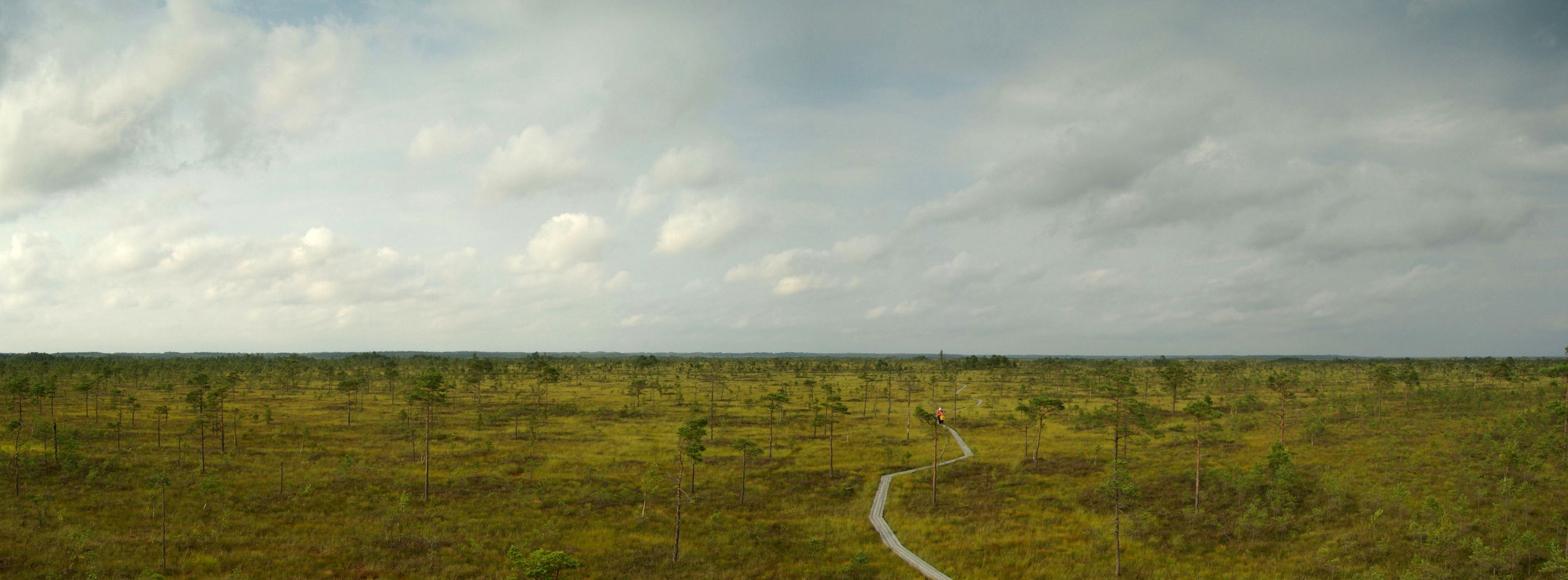
Kuresoo Bog

Kuresoo Bog is a bog in Viljandi County, Estonia. The bog is located in Soomaa National Park. This bog is one of the largest in Estonia.

The area of the bog is 10,843 ha.

== Restoration efforts ==
The restoration of Kuresoo Bog has been an ongoing effort in Estonia, the main goal of the restoration is to use different damming technologies, such that Sphagnum growth is at a good level.
