= Johnville F.C. =

Johnville F.C. may refer to:

- Johnville F.C. (Dublin)
- Johnville F.C. (Waterford)
