= Joseph Pines Preserve =

Nature preserve in Virginia, US

- Location within Virginia
- Location: Southeast Virginia, Virginia, United States
- Coordinates: 36.555°N 77.154°W
- Area: 428 acres (173 ha)
- Established: 2012
- Website: dof.virginia.gov

Joseph Pines Preserve is a nature preserve in Sussex County, Virginia. The preserve totals 428 acres (173 ha), consisting of a conservation easement for the restoration of the native longleaf pine historic to Sussex County.

It was created in 2012 when 232 acres (94 ha) of land was purchased by the Virginia Department of Forestry and Meadowview Biological Research Station, a nonprofit organization aiming to preserve pitcher plant bogs (or "seepage wetlands") and associated ecosystems in Maine and Virginia. It was expanded by a further 196 acres (79 ha) in 2021. It contains a Center for Biodiversity used to promote restoration and education of the native wetlands through its rare plant nursery and on-site classes, which was opened in October 2014.
