= Max Bog =

Protected area in Somerset, England

- Site of Special Scientific Interest
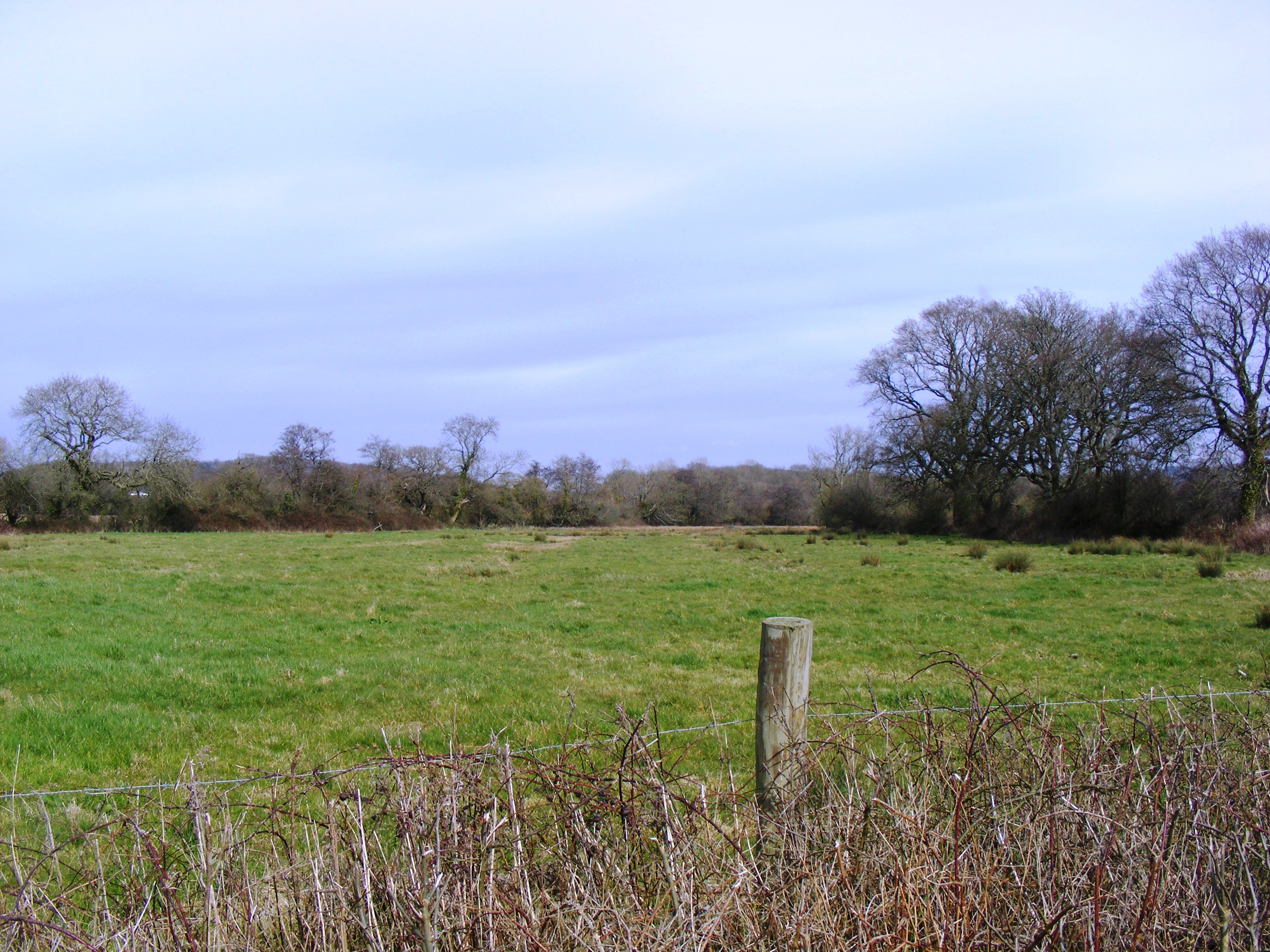

- Location within Somerset
- Location of Max Bog.
- Area of search: Avon
- Grid reference: ST406574
- Coordinates: 51.3131°N 2.8529°W
- Interest: Biological
- Area: 10.6 hectares (0.106 km^{2}; 0.041 sq mi)
- Notification date: 1988

Max Bog is a 10.6 hectare biological Site of Special Scientific Interest in North Somerset, notified in 1988.

The site is owned by North Somerset Council and managed by the Avon Wildlife Trust for the range of wetland plants that it supports. There is no access without a permit.

== Ecology ==
Marsh Helleborine occurs here and nowhere else in Avon. Lesser Butterfly-orchid and Fragrant Orchid also occur here, and at only one other Avon site each. It is also home to Yellow Rattle, Meadow Sweet and Meadow Thistle. The reserve is also important for its invertebrate interest and is home to many species of moth, grasshopper and dragonfly.

Narrow-leaved Marsh-orchid is found in adjacent fields.

Dactylorhiza orchids are well represented, including the hybrids D. × grandis and D. × hallii.

== See also ==
- Yanal Bog, a similar SSSI to the northeast of Max Bog
