= Saco Heath Preserve =

Nature preserve in Saco, Maine, US

Coordinates: 43.553°N 70.468°W

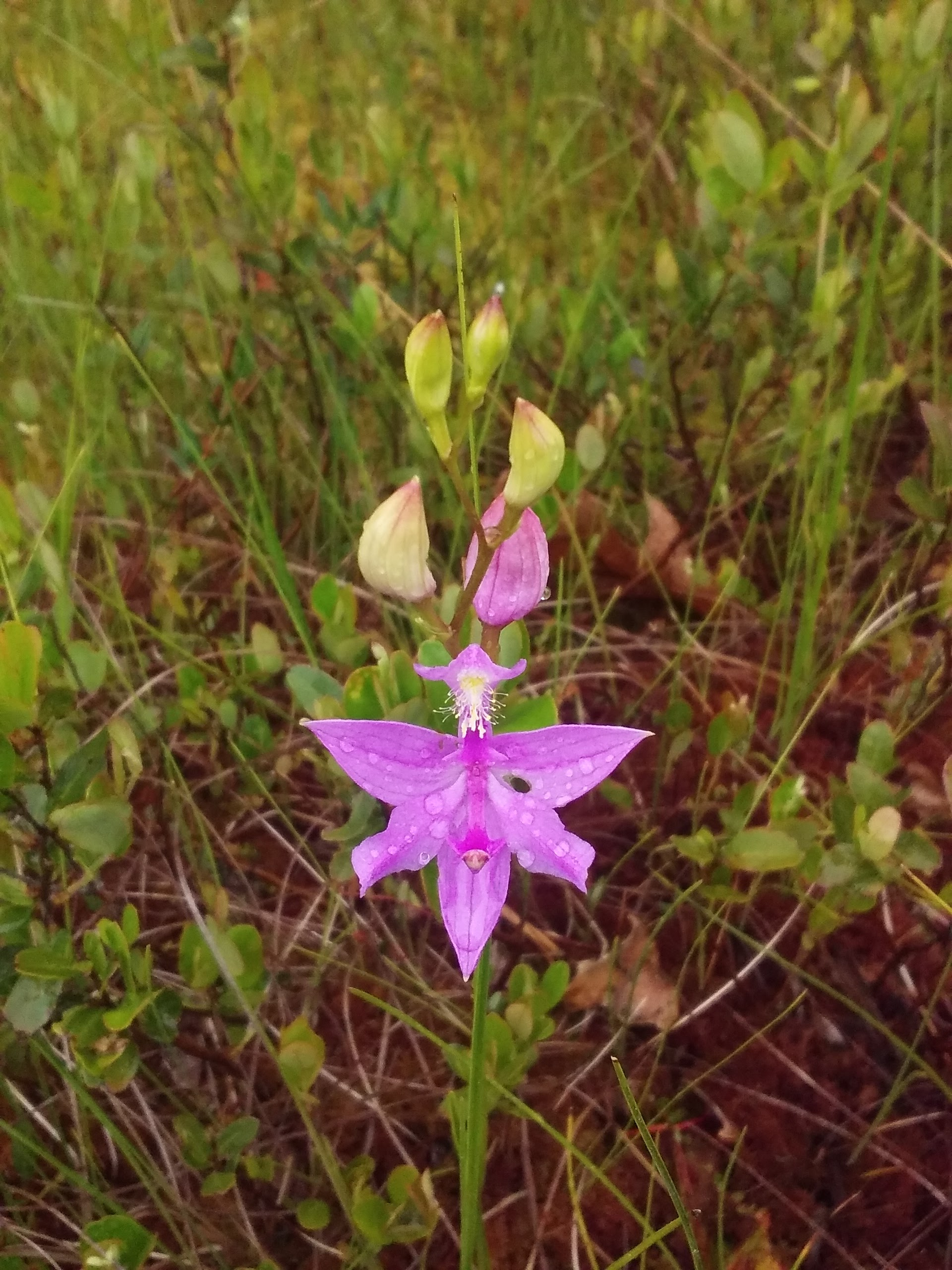
Calopogon tuberosus at the Saco Heath Preserve

The Saco Heath Preserve is a 1,233-acre (499 ha) nature preserve located in Saco, Maine. It is managed by the Nature Conservancy.

It contains one of the largest stands of Atlantic White Cedar in Maine and supports one of the only two populations in Maine of the Hessel's hairstreak butterfly.

The preserve contains a narrow 1-mile long boardwalk winding through a small portion of the bog and was closed during the COVID-19 pandemic.
