= Puhatu Nature Reserve =

Protected area in Estonia

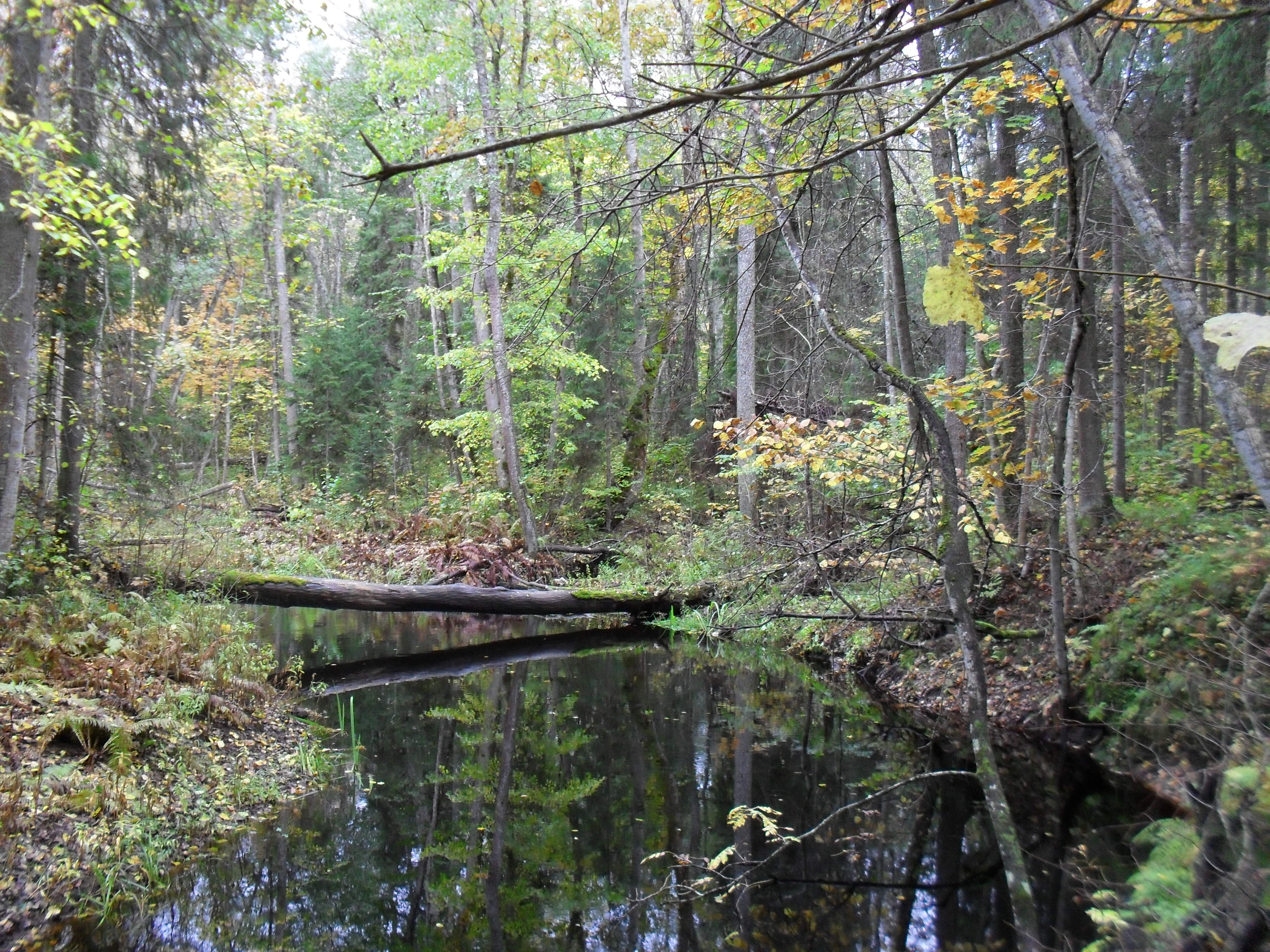

- Location within Estonia
- Location: Estonia
- Nearest city: Narva
- Coordinates: 59°10′34″N 27°43′14″E
- Area: 12,320 ha (30,400 acres)

Puhatu Nature Reserve is a nature reserve situated eastern Estonia, in Ida-Viru County.

The nature reserve is centred on one of the largest wetlands in Estonia, composed of mires, alluvial forest and the Poruni River. The wetland has decreased due to oil shale mining, peat production and drainage. The nature reserve is the home of 21 different protected species of plants, and a number of unusual mammals and birds, including three kinds of eagle. The reserve also serves as an important stopover for migratory species. A study trail has been constructed for visitors.
