= Yanal Bog =

Protected area in Somerset, England

- Site of Special Scientific Interest
- Location within Somerset
- Location of Yanal Bog.
- Area of search: North Somerset
- Grid reference: ST424607
- Coordinates: 51.3424°N 2.8283°W
- Interest: Biological
- Area: 1.6 hectares (0.016 km^{2}; 0.0062 sq mi)
- Notification date: 1988

Yanal Bog (grid reference ST424607) is a 1.6 hectare biological Site of Special Scientific Interest on the southern edge of the North Somerset Levels, just north of the village of Sandford, North Somerset. It was notified as an SSSI in 1988.

== Site description ==
Yanal Bog is a calcicolous lowland mire. Underlying the site are gravels and clay alluvium. Above this sits a layer of peat. This results in a high water table, creating a distinct domed landscape feature.

== Biological interest ==
The plant communities of the mire are nationally rare in Britain, and support two species, Black Bog-rush (Schoenus nigricans) and Blunt-flowered Rush (Juncus subnodulosus), that have restricted distributions in south-west England, and a number of species that are localised in the North Somerset area. Surrounding the raised mire is a belt of grassland; although this is included within the SSSI, it is largely made up of common grass and herb species.

In the community in the western part of the mire, Blunt-flowered Rush, Purple Moor-grass (Molinia caerulea) and Carnation Sedge (Carex panicea) are abundant species, and this part of the mire is characterised by the presence of a number of species that favour base-rich conditions. Black Bog-rush is locally abundant along a wet drainage ditch in this western part of the site. In the eastern part of the mire Purple Moor-grass and Blunt-flowered Rush are again abundant, but the abundant sedge species are Lesser Pond-sedge (Carex acutiformis) and Greater Pond-sedge (Carex riparia). Common Reed (Phragmites australis) and Marsh Horsetail (Equisetum palustre) are also frequent. This part of the site supports plant species associated with more neutral conditions.

The site has a species-rich flora; species that occur here but are localised or confined to specialised habitats in North Somerset are Flea Sedge (Carex pulicaris), Saw-wort (Serratula tinctoria), Meadow Thistle (Cirsium dissectum), Marsh Valerian (Valeriana dioica), Dyer’s Greenweed (Genista tinctoria), Marsh Arrowgrass (Triglochin palustris), Southern Marsh-orchid (Dactylorhiza praetermissa), Fen Bedstraw (Galium uliginosum), Devil’s-bit Scabious (Succisa pratensis) and Tawny Sedge (Carex hostiana) and Tufted-sedge (Carex elata).

== See also ==
- Max Bog, a similar SSSI to the southwest of Yanal Bog

== Sources ==
- English Nature citation sheet for the site (accessed 15 July 2006)
