= Bernshausen =

Coordinates: 51°33′59″N 10°10′40″E

- Village
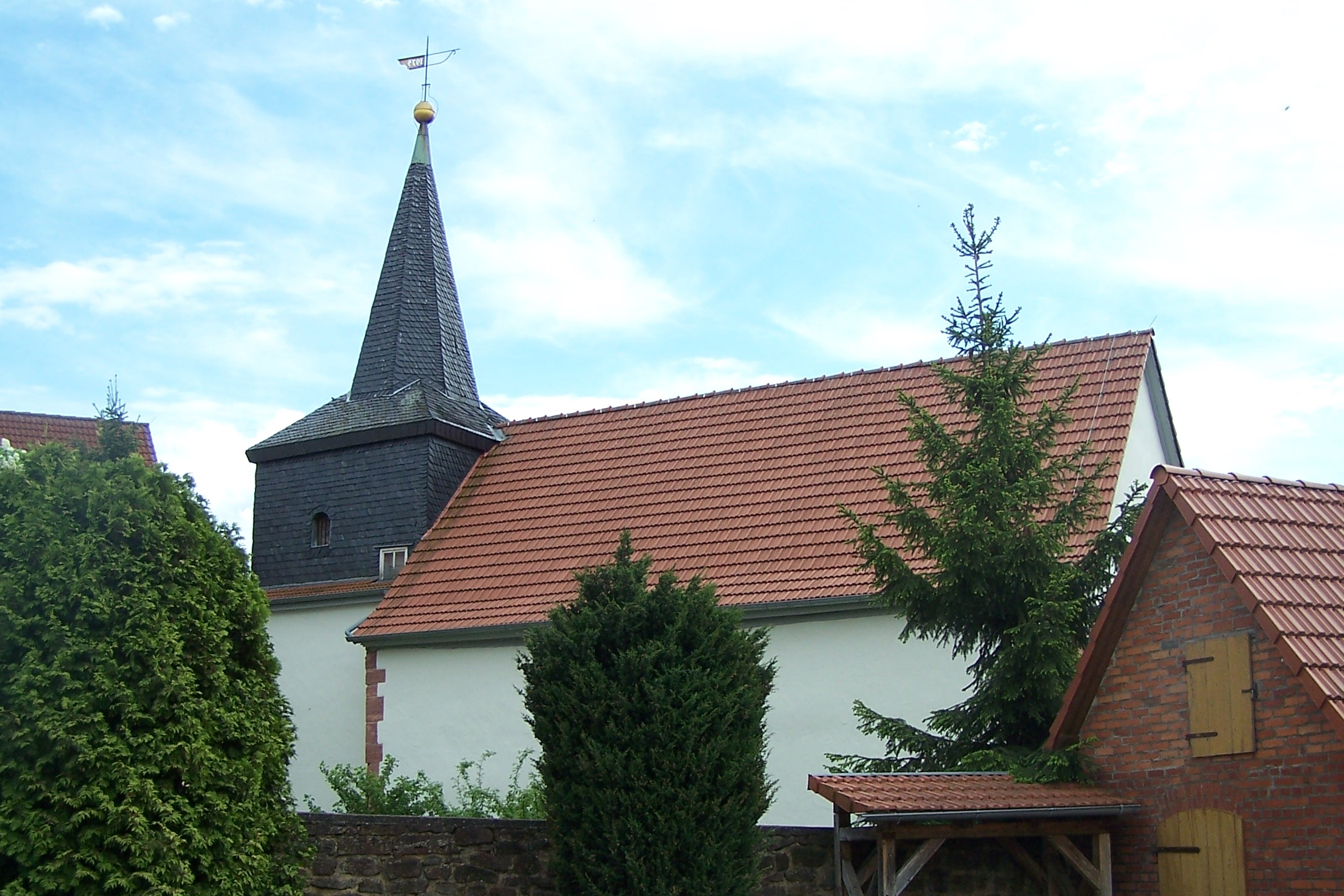
- Interactive map of Bernshausen
- Country: Germany
- State: Lower Saxony
- Municipality: Seeburg

Area
  - Total: 5.39 km^{2} (2.08 sq mi)

Population
  - Total: 590
  - Density: 110/km^{2} (280/sq mi)

Bernshausen is a village in the Gemeinde Seeburg, Lower Saxony, Germany, with a population of about 590. It lies across the lake, named Seeburger See, from the larger village of Seeburg proper, to the west. The Aue creek flows out of the lake and through the village. Bernshausen has an area of 5.39 square kilometers (2.08 mi^{2}).

== History ==
The area around the village has a number of prehistoric remains, dating back to the Late Paleolithic and especially to the Neolithic (LBK) but also the Bronze and Iron Ages. However, there is no evidence for continuous settlement on the east side of the lake before a refuge fort established in the 7th century, less than half a kilometer south of the village, on the bank of the lake. In the High to Late Middle Ages, a half-timbered motte-and-bailey were present on the south-west edge of what is now the village proper.

The village has been thrice largely destroyed: in 1438 and 1626 due to the ravages of war, and more recently, in 1897, by accidental fire.
