= Nigula Bog =

Bog in Estonia

Coordinates: 58.004°N 24.682°E

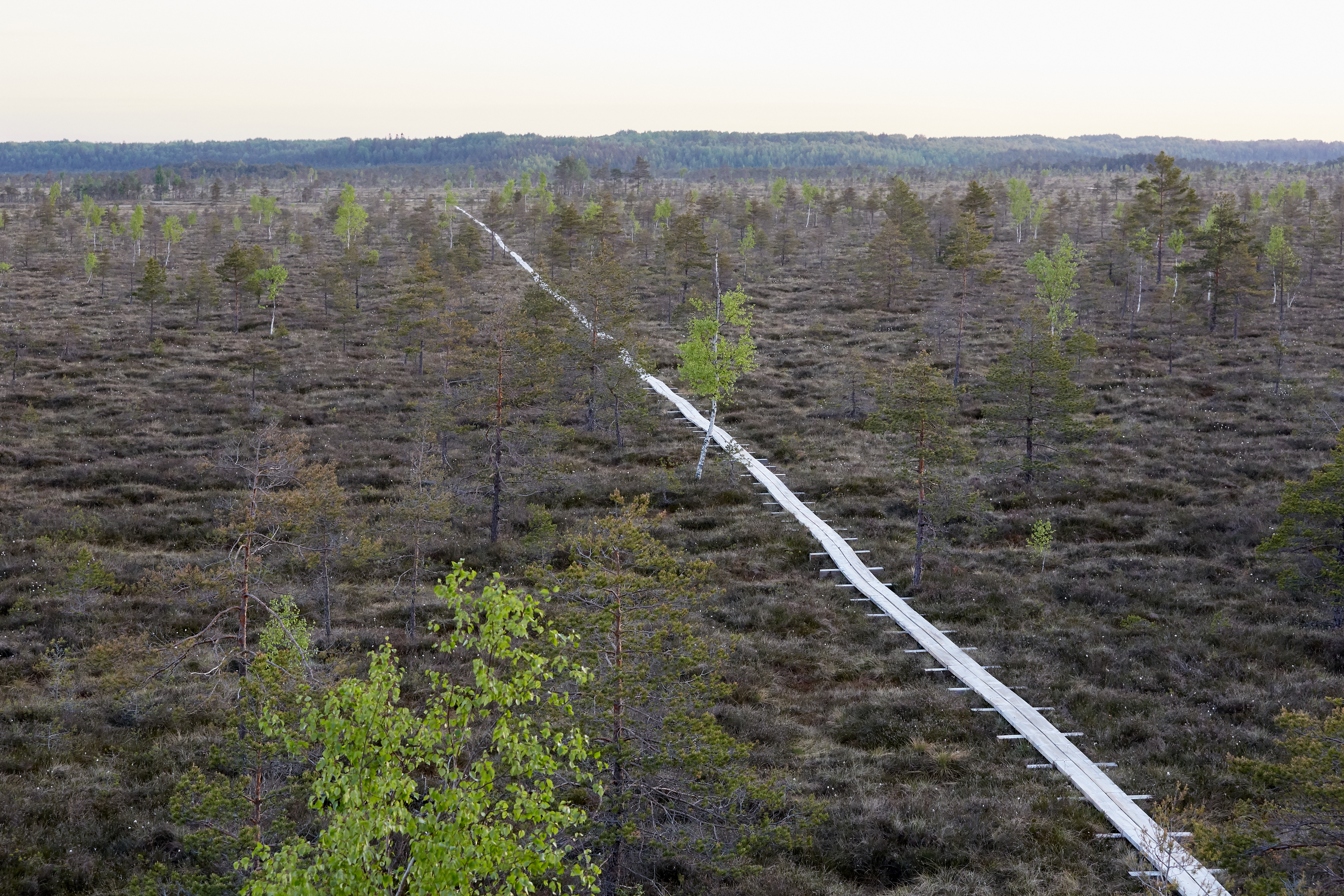
Nigula Bog (in spring 2018)

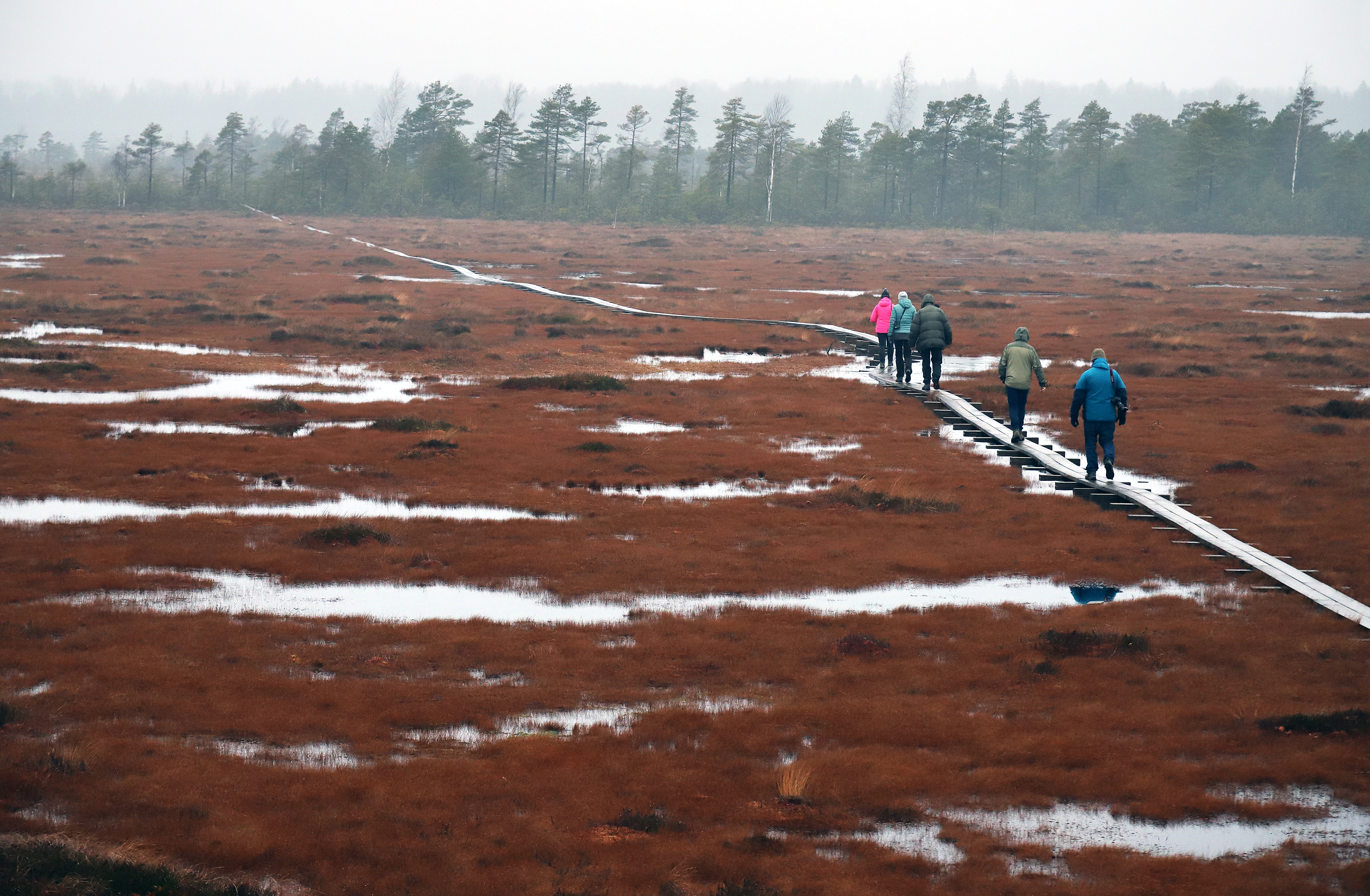
Nigula Bog (in winter 2020)

Nigula Bog is a bog in Pärnu County, Estonia.

The area of the bog is 2320 ha.

Thickness of peat layer is not more than 6.8 m.
