= The Bog Garden =

Park in Greensboro, North Carolina, United States

Coordinates: 36.0901°N 79.8388°W

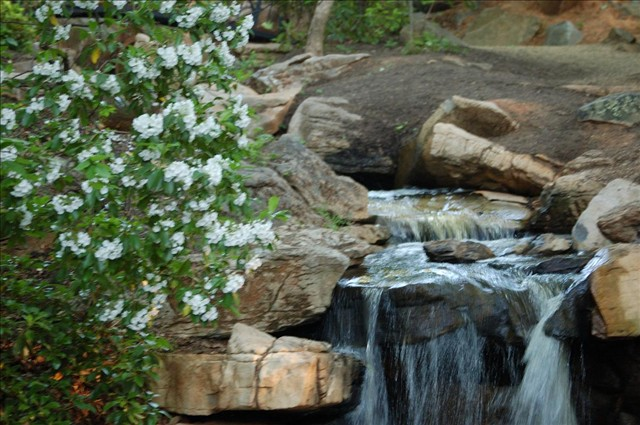
- A waterfall in the garden.
- Interactive map of The Bog Garden
- Type: Nature preserve, Botanical garden, City park
- Owner: City of Greensboro
- Website: Official website

The Bog Garden is a nature preserve, botanical garden, and city park located at 1101 Hobbs Road, Greensboro, North Carolina. It is open daily; admission is free.

Originally part of Starmount Farms, the land that comprises the park was donated to the City of Greensboro Parks and Recreation department by the Starmount Company in 1987. A local primary care physician, Dr. Joe Christian, took interest in the area and worked with city staff, volunteers, and local nurseries to plan and rehabilitate the park into an example of a wetland environment using plants native to the area. In 2005, a 150-foot man-made waterfall was installed in the park, and dedicated in "Dr. Joe's" memory in 2007.

The garden features a bog and lake that may be viewed from a half-mile long elevated boardwalk. Its plants include indigenous vegetation, with individually labeled trees, shrubs, ferns, and bamboo, as well as wildflowers and wild roses. The site is also a haven for native and migratory birds.

== See also ==
- List of botanical gardens in the United States
