= Seeburger See =

Lake in Lower Eichsfeld, Lower Saxony, Germany

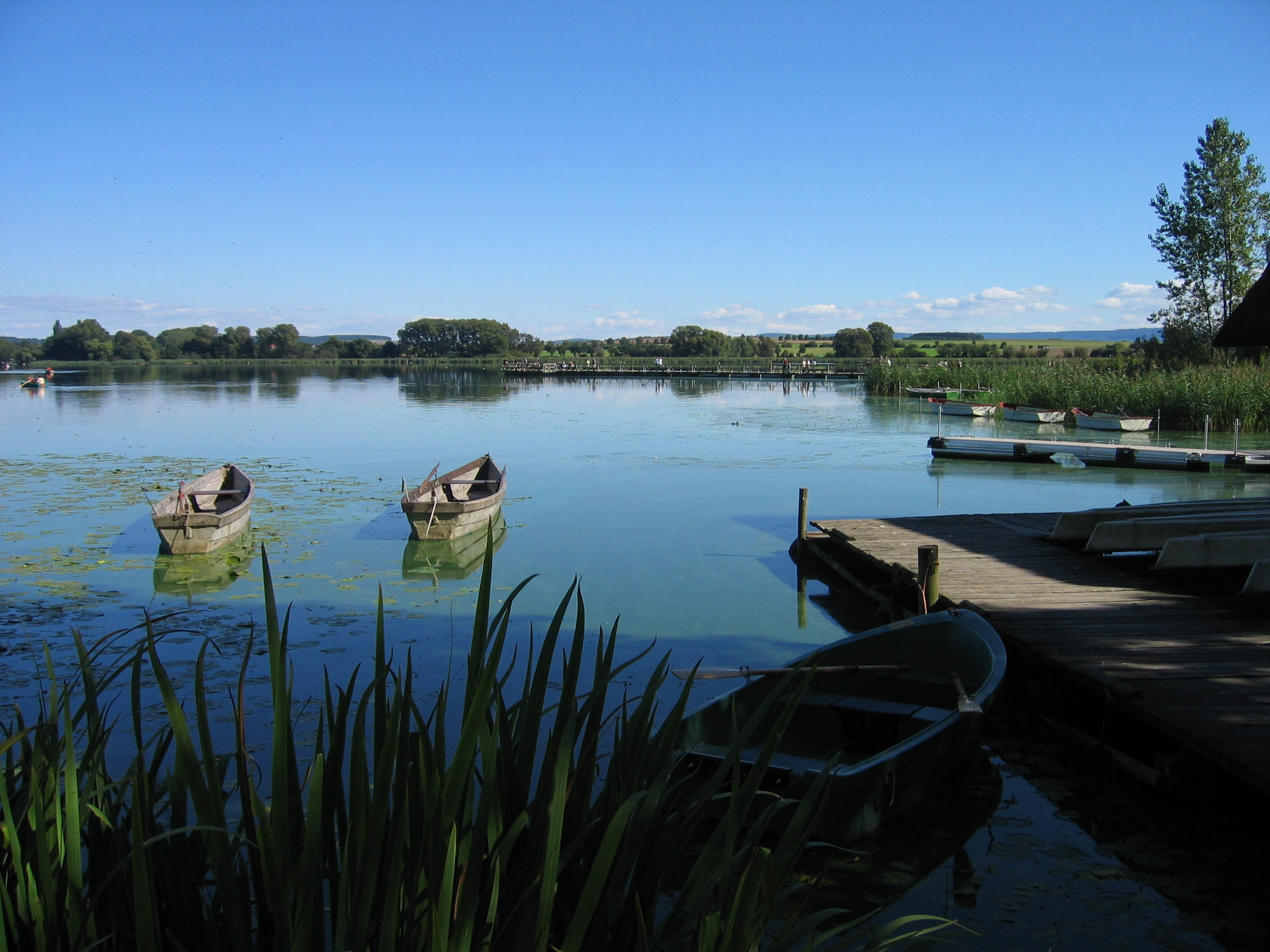

- Location within Lower Saxony
- Location: Landkreis Göttingen, Lower Saxony
- Coordinates: 51°33′54″N 10°9′52″E
- Primary inflows: Aue
- Primary outflows: Aue
- Basin countries: Germany
- Max. length: 1.2 km (0.75 mi)
- Max. width: 1.1 km (0.68 mi)
- Surface area: 0.865 km^{2} (0.334 sq mi)
- Max. depth: 3.5 m (11 ft)
- Surface elevation: 157 m (515 ft)
- Settlements: Bernshausen, Seeburg

Seeburger See is a lake in the karst region of the Lower Eichsfeld, Landkreis Göttingen, in southeastern Lower Saxony, Germany.

Also known as Auge des Eichsfelds (Eye of the Eichsfeld), the shallow 86.5-hectare (0.865 km^{2}) lake is fed in the west by the Aue creek at Seeburg and drained to the east in Bernshausen by the same creek and lies at an elevation of 157 m AMSL. The lake is postglacial, having formed about 500 B.C. when a cave collapsed. The lake is the largest natural body of water in Göttingen district. It is bordered in places by reedy growth and elsewhere by trees and grasslands. Other than the two villages, the surrounding land is mostly agricultural, though there is a recreational area with swimming facilities near Seeburg, and a large part of the lake's shoreline ("Naturschutzgebiet Seeburger See") and a small forested area to the north are protected nature zones. Controlled fishing is allowed in the lake, with eel being the most common (and providing a popular local specialty, smoked eel), along with small pike, zander, carp, tench, common rudd, trout, and a few others.

The lake is the area of interest for locals, people from nearby cities and the Netherlands, there being camp-grounds, recreational facilities, an archaeological site, and a nature-information center as well as a path along the lake shore. In the 1980s, the Seeburger See area was subject to both extensive and intensive archaeological research, which revealed a large amount of Neolithic activity as well as lesser Bronze and Iron Age presences and the medieval predecessors of today's communities.

== History ==
In the late Middle Ages, the lake came to its greatest size. Clear evidence for fishing in the lake is found in an archival record concerning the fishermen's guild of Bernshausen and Seeburg in the sixteenth century. The lake's current most commonly used name (Seeburger See) has its earliest recorded use in 1807. Before that, it was simply referred to as der großer See bei Bernshausen. On rare occasions, temporary islands have appeared in the lake. This has occurred early in the twentieth century. The lake and its shore were designated a protected natural area in 1952. In 1970, the Seeburger See sailing club was founded. In 1976, the protected area became an official Naturschutzgebiet.

== In literature and legend ==
Seeburger See is the locale of the legend of the evil Graf [Count] Isang. It is locally claimed that at low-water, the tower of the count's castle can be seen. In fact, early in the twentieth century, for a very short time, an island did appear in the lake.

== See also ==
- Bernshausen
- Seeburg
- Aue
