= Johnville Bog & Forest Park =

- Parc écoforestier de Johnville
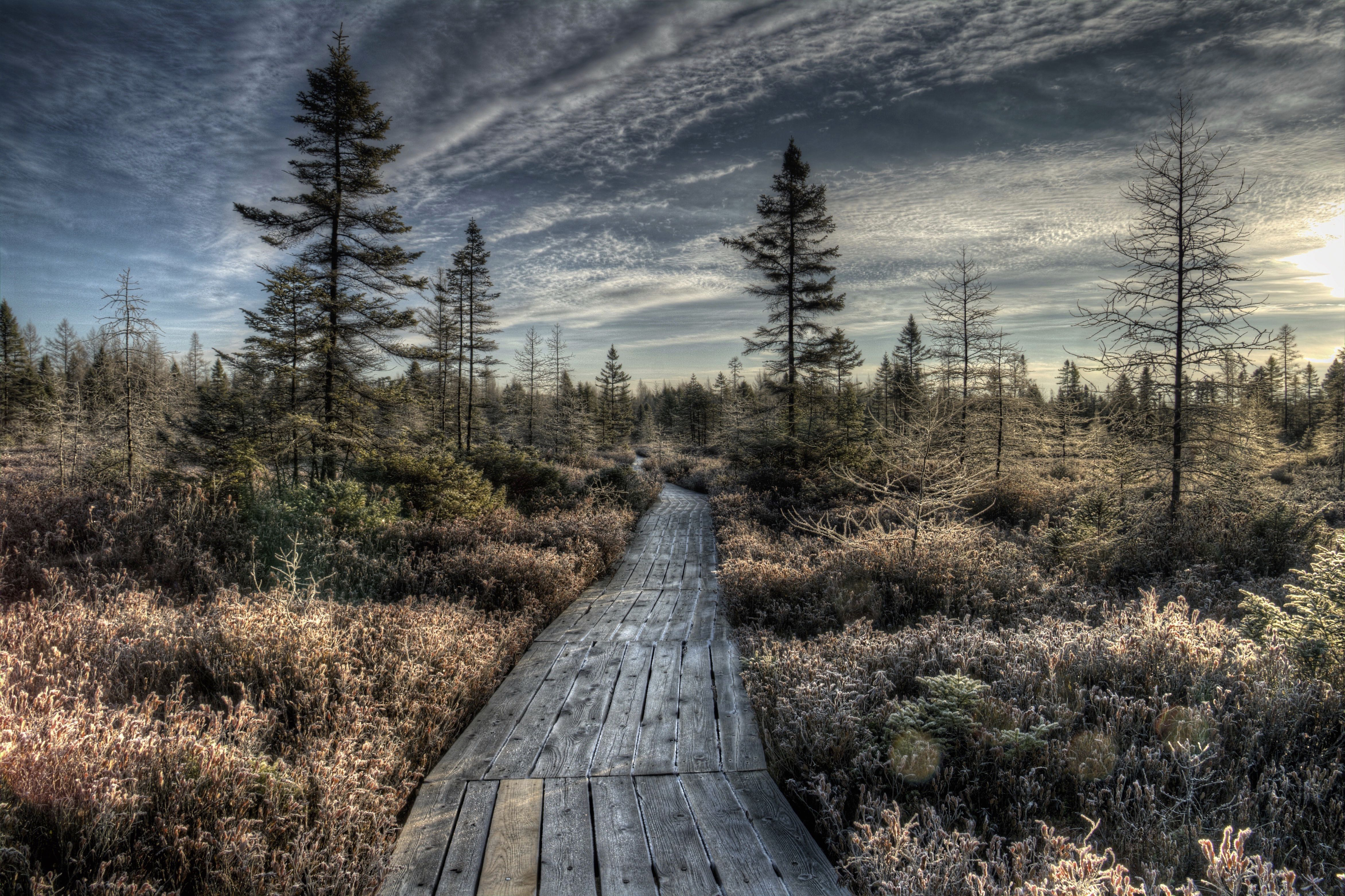

- Location within Southern Quebec
- Location: Quebec, Canada
- Nearest city: Cookshire-Eaton
- Coordinates: 45°20′39″N 71°44′23″W
- Area: 225 hectares (560 acres)
- Established: 1986
- Governing body: Nature Eastern Townships
- Website: https://web.archive.org/web/20140516203231/http://johnville-park.qc.ca/

The Johnville Bog & Forest Park (French: Parc écoforestier de Johnville) is a protected area in Estrie, Quebec, Canada that encompasses the Johnville Bog (French: Tourbière de Johnville) and its surroundings. In addition to the bog, this also includes a kettle, a lake (Lacs Jenckes), and a pond.

== Etymology ==
The park takes its name from the hamlet of Johnville, located in Cookshire-Eaton. Johnville was named after a man named John Sewell Sanborn (born 1819 in New Hampshire) who over the course of his life was a lawyer, deputy of Sherbrooke, senator of Wellington, and Saint-François district Superior Court judge. He sat on the Queen's Bench in Montreal until his death in 1877. He was a "fervent annexationist" and wished for Canada to become part of the United States.

The bog was formerly known as the Marécages de Johnville.

In 2010, on what would have been his 100th birthday, the Arthur-N.-Langford Pond was inaugurated in honour of the founder of the Bishop's University Biology Department.

== History ==
During the urban agglomeration in 2002, the City of Sherbrooke acquired the borough of Lennoxville, and along with it, the bog. Lennoxville had long used the lands as its water source, which has since been abandoned.

In 1989, the Johnville Woodland Conservation Corporation (known today as Nature Eastern Townships) was created to "promote ... the importance of insuring the conservation in perpetuity of the quite unique ecosystems of the Johnville Bog and Forest Park."

The park has been open to the public since 2003.

In 2008, the Corporation signed an administrative agreement with the City of Sherbrooke regarding long-term leasing and conservation easement.

In December 2010, following a recommendation by the Ministry of Municipal Affairs, the City of Sherbrooke transferred ownership of the park to Bishop's University and the Université de Sherbrooke (since the land actually belongs in the jurisdiction of Cookshire-Eaton, not Sherbrooke).

== Recreation ==
The park contains 5.5 km (3.4 mi) of walking trails in the summer, some of which wander on stilts over the bog, and 8 km (5.0 mi) for cross-country skiing or snowshoeing in the winter. Wildlife observers, particularly birders, might be interested in the Cooper's hawk, palm warblers, Lincoln's sparrows, hen harriers, and various waterfowl.

== Wildlife ==
Given its unusual ecosystems, the park contains a number of species of flora and fauna that are unique to the area.
