= Großes Moor (lake) =

Lake in Mecklenburg-Vorpommern, Germany

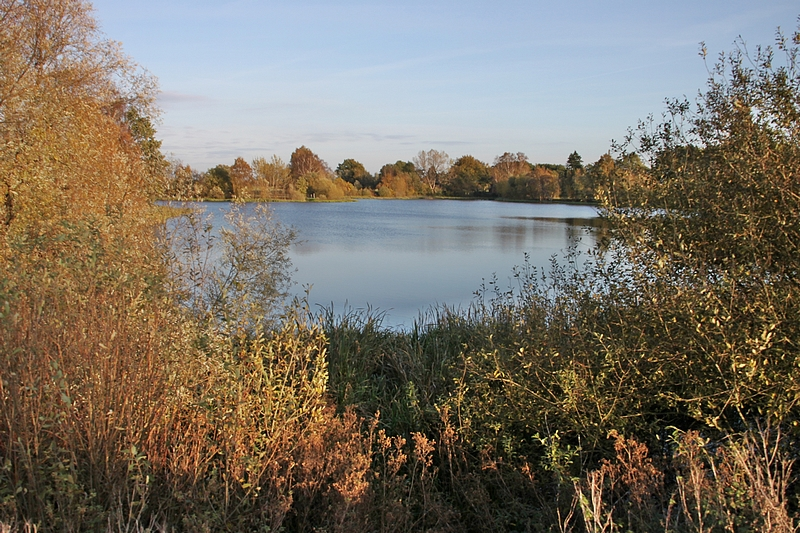

- Location within Mecklenburg-Vorpommern
- Location: Rostock, Mecklenburg-Vorpommern
- Coordinates: 54.06731°N 11.90313°E
- Basin countries: Germany
- Surface area: 0.055 km^{2} (0.021 sq mi)
- Surface elevation: 81.8 m (268 ft)

Großes Moor is a lake in the Rostock district in Mecklenburg-Vorpommern, Germany. At an elevation of 81.8 m, its surface area is 0.055 km^{2}.
