= Hummock =

Small knoll or mound above ground

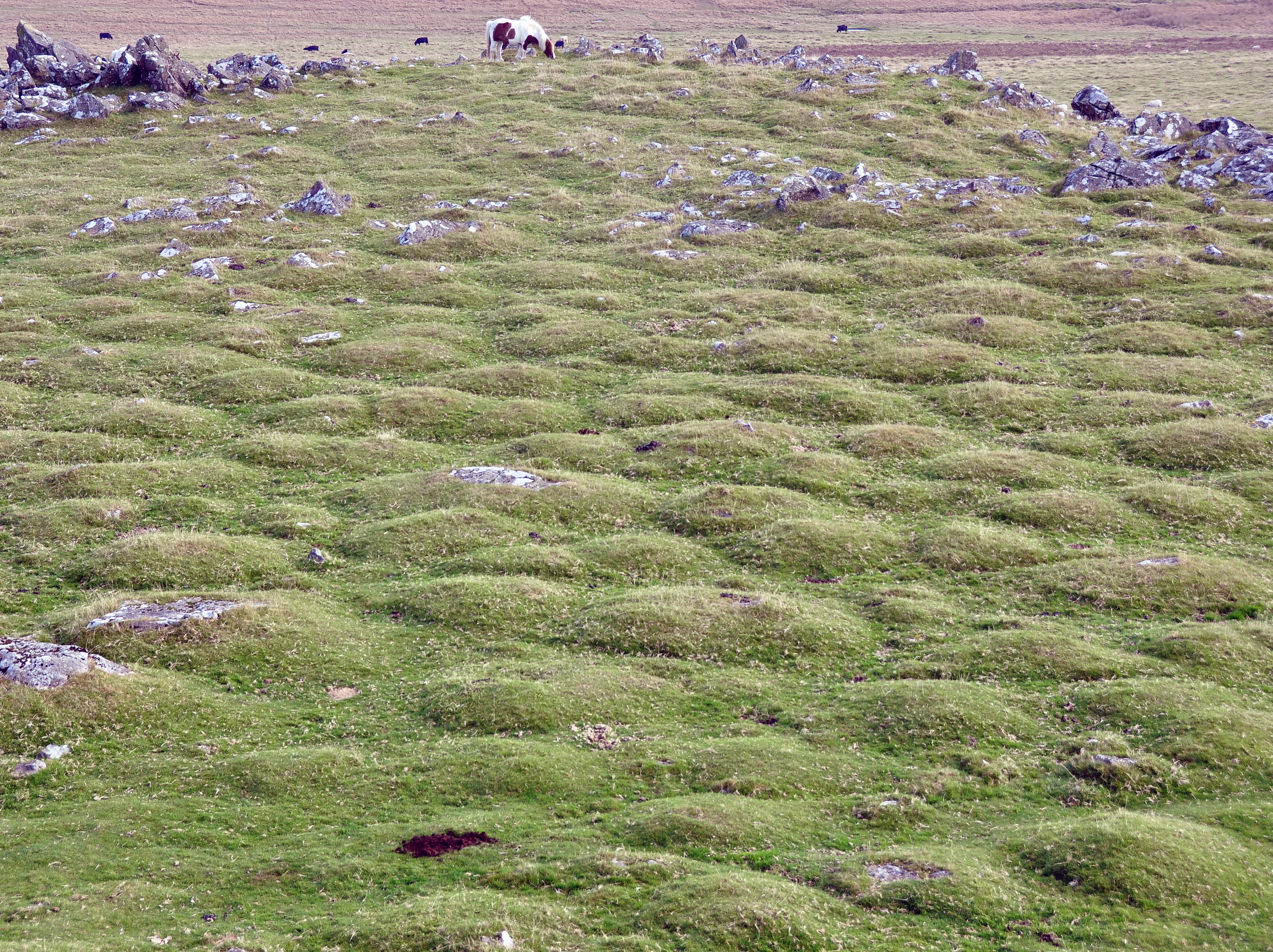
Earth hummocks in England

In geology, a hummock is a small knoll or mound above ground. They are typically less than 15 meters (50 ft) in height and tend to appear in groups or fields. Large landslide avalanches that typically occur in volcanic areas are responsible for formation of hummocks. From the initiation of the landslide to the final formation, hummocks can be characterized by their evolution, spatial distribution, and internal structure. As the movement of the landslide begins, the extension faulting results in formation of hummocks, with smaller ones at the front of the landslide and larger ones in the back. The size of the hummocks is dependent on their position in the initial mass. As this mass spreads, the hummocks further modify to either break up or to merge and form larger structures. It is difficult to make generalizations about hummocks because of the diversity in their morphology and sedimentology. An extremely irregular surface may be called hummocky.

An ice hummock is a boss or rounded knoll of ice rising above the general level of an ice-field. Hummocky ice is caused by slow and unequal pressure in the main body of the packed ice, and by unequal structure and temperature at a later period.

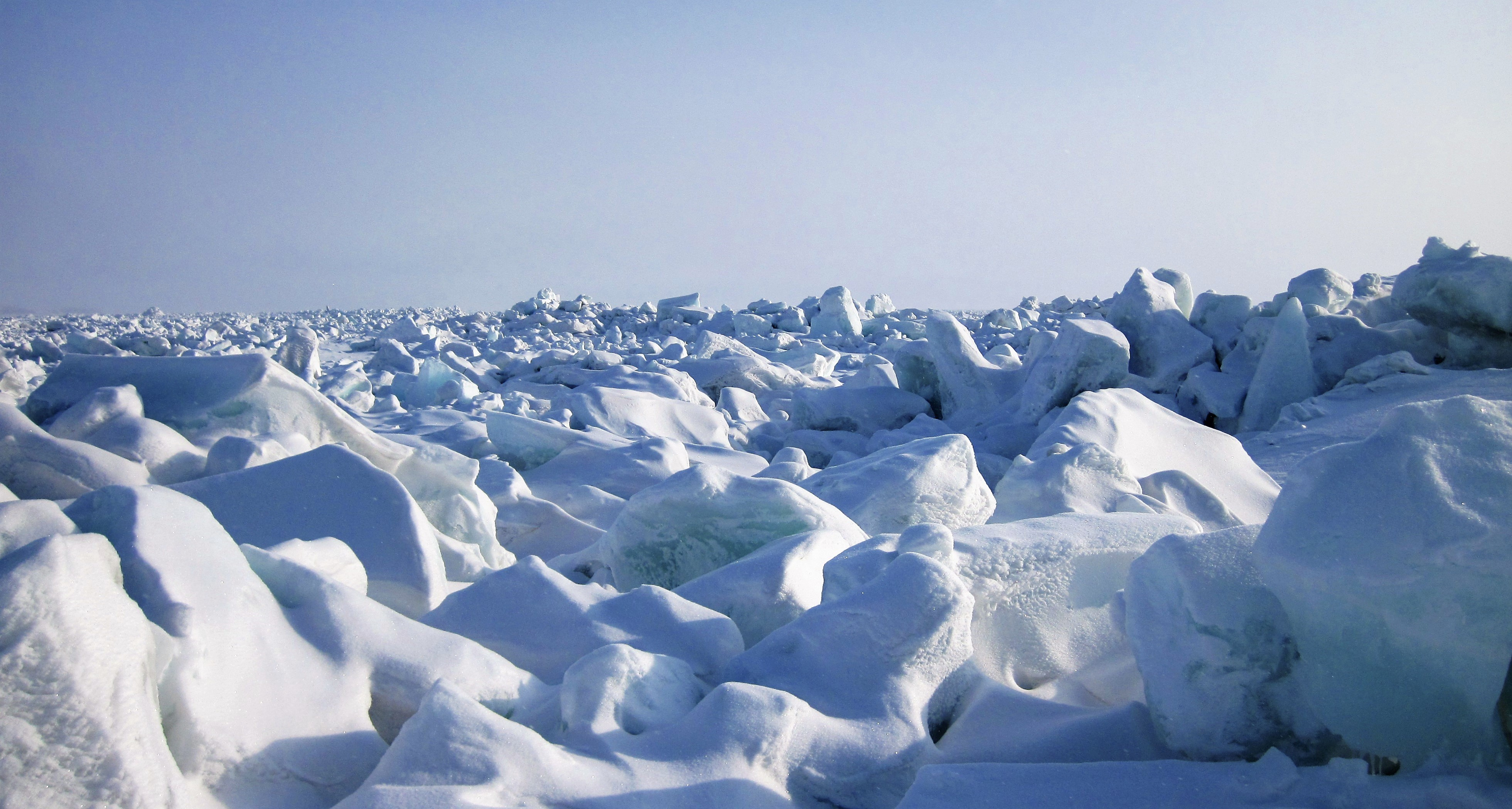
Ice hummocks

== Bog hummocks ==
Hummocks in the shape of low ridges of drier peat moss typically form part of the structure of certain types of raised bog, such as plateau, kermi, palsa or string bog. The hummocks alternate with shallow wet depressions or flarks.

== Swamp hummocks ==
Swamp hummocks are mounds typically initiated as fallen trunks or branches covered with moss and rising above the swamp floor. The low-lying areas between hummocks are called hollows. A related term, used in the Southeastern United States, is "hammock".

== Cryogenic earth hummocks ==
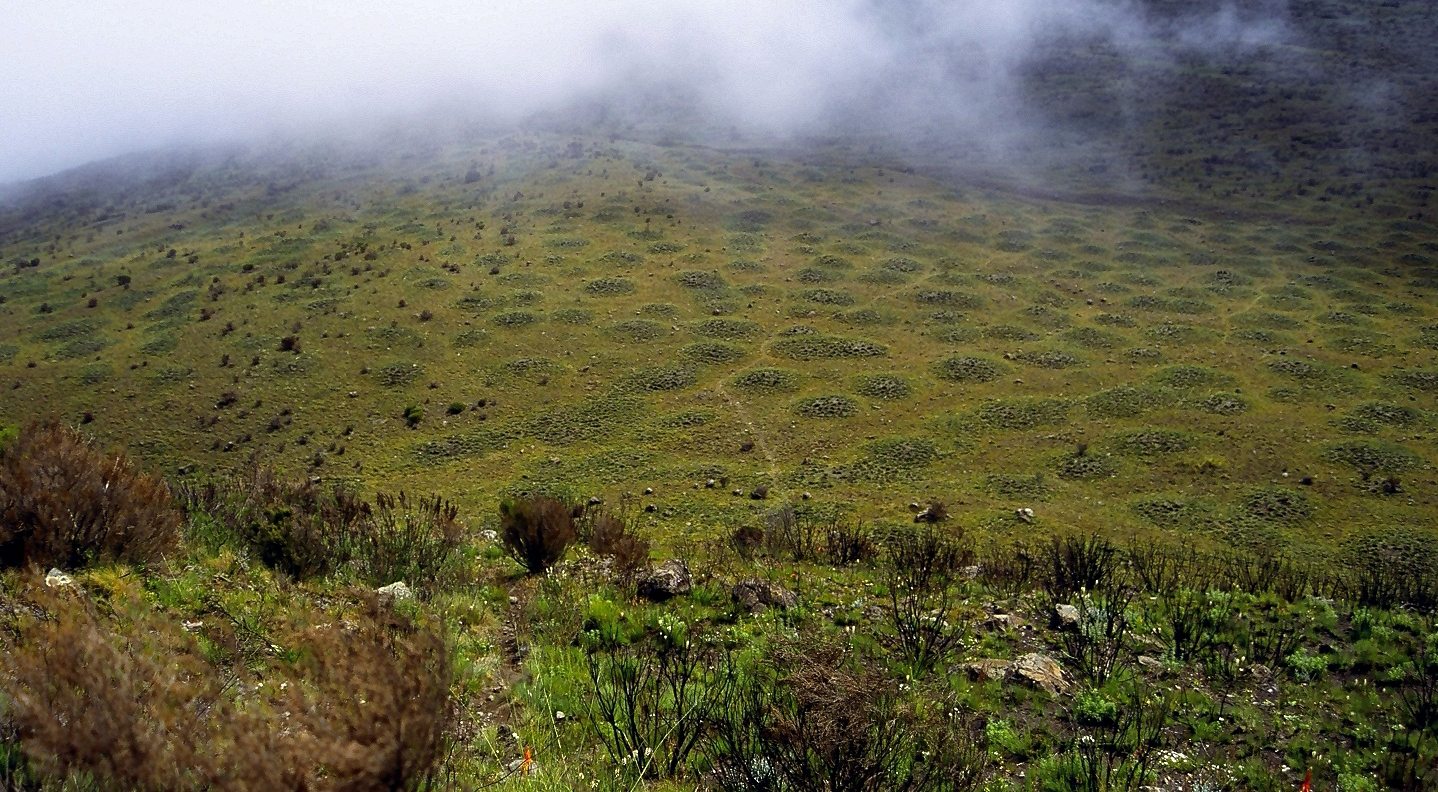
Cryogenic earth hummocks on Mount Kenya

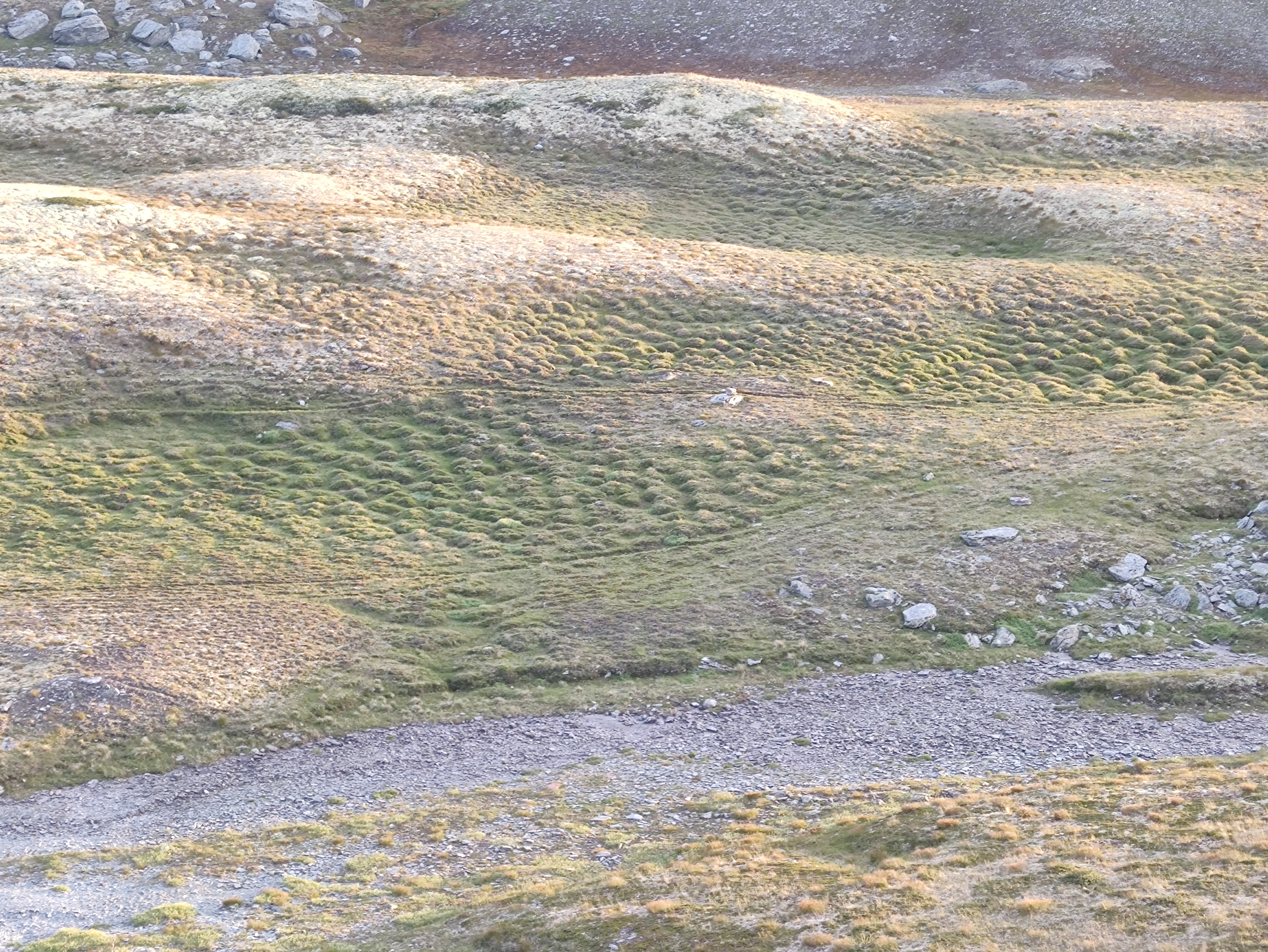
Cryogenic earth hummocks on the Olmflya plateau, Norway

Cryogenic earth hummocks go by various names; in North America they are known as earth hummocks; the Icelandic term þúfa/thúfa (pl. þúfur/thúfur) is also used to describe them in Greenland and Iceland, and the Finnish term pounu (pl. pounut) in Fennoscandia. These cold-climate landforms appear in regions of permafrost and seasonally frozen ground. They usually develop in fine-grained soils with light to moderate vegetation in areas of low relief where there is adequate moisture to fuel cryogenic processes. Cryogenic earth hummocks appear in a variety of cold-ground environments, making the story of their genesis complex. Geologists recognize that hummocks may be polygenetic and form by a combination of forces that are yet to be well understood. Recent research on cryogenic hummocks has focused on their role as environmental indicators. Because hummocks can both form and disintegrate rapidly (well within a human lifetime) they are an ideal landform to monitor for medium range environmental change. There are several explanations of earth hummock formation. Hummocks may form as a result of clasts migrating to the surface through frost push and pull mechanisms. As the clasts rise they push up on the ground above forming bulging mounds.

=== Oscillating cryogenic earth hummocks ===
Cryogenic hummocks are found covered in vegetation in Taiga and Boreal forests. They are also known as active hummocks due to the freeze and thaw cycle of the ice lenses that continually occur within the organic layers of their mounds. The freezing of ice lenses is what causes the mounds to rise. When the ice lenses thaw during a forest fire, the mounds collapse until they freeze again.

=== Thufurs ===
Thufurs are small sized hummocks typically found in climates like that of Iceland. They tend to occur in areas with seasonal freezing and maritime climates. While their sediment is rich in silt, the primary make up of these mounds is volcanic ash. A clear display of layers of volcanic ash is observed within these Thufurs amidst other organic matter.

=== Cellular circulation ===
Hummock excavation normally reveals a disturbed soil profile, often with irregular streaks of organic matter or other colorations suggesting fluidity at some point in the past. The disturbance, a form of cryoturbation, often extends to a depth roughly equal to the hummock’s height. This has been explained by some as the result of convection processes whereby warmer soil and water at depth expands, becomes less dense and rises, while gravity forces denser soil downwards. Circulation has also been explained as driven solely by density of soil material and not temperature induced density changes.

=== Differential frost heave (cryostatic pressure hypothesis) ===
This is the most widely accepted explanation of cryogenic hummock genesis. Irregularities in preexisting ground conditions (differences in grain size, ground temperature, moisture conditions of vegetation) cause surface-downwards freezing during the winter to spread unevenly. Encroaching frost exerts increasing pressure on the adjacent unfrozen soil. Trapped between the freezing surface soils and the buried permafrost layer, the soil material is forced upwards into hummocks. While this is currently the most commonly accepted hypothesis, there is still only limited evidence of this happening.

== Hummocks created by debris avalanches ==
Debris avalanches are caused by sudden collapses of large volumes of rock from the flanks of mountains, especially volcanoes. These events are fast-moving, gravity-driven currents of saturated debris that do not necessarily include juvenile material. Debris avalanche deposits are characterized by the debris-avalanche block (hummocks) and the debris-avalanche matrix. Debris avalanches are diagnosed for landscapes where the volcano has an amphitheater at the source with hummocky terrain downhill. In some cases, such as Mount Shasta in California, the amphitheater has been filled in by later volcanic activity and all that remains are the hummocks.

Debris avalanche blocks are identifiable because they keep their internal stratigraphy. The blocks simply break off the mountain and slide down, completely intact, identifiable because they differ from the surrounding landscape. The volume and height of hummocks is mostly dependent on their location; the closer to the source region, the larger they become. The bottom layer of a debris avalanche deposit is the fine-grained matrix which forms due to the shear at the base of the large, turbulent moving mass.
