= Raised bog =

Type of wetland

Aerial view of seven of the most important raised bogs sites in Wales; Natural Resources Wales, 2017.

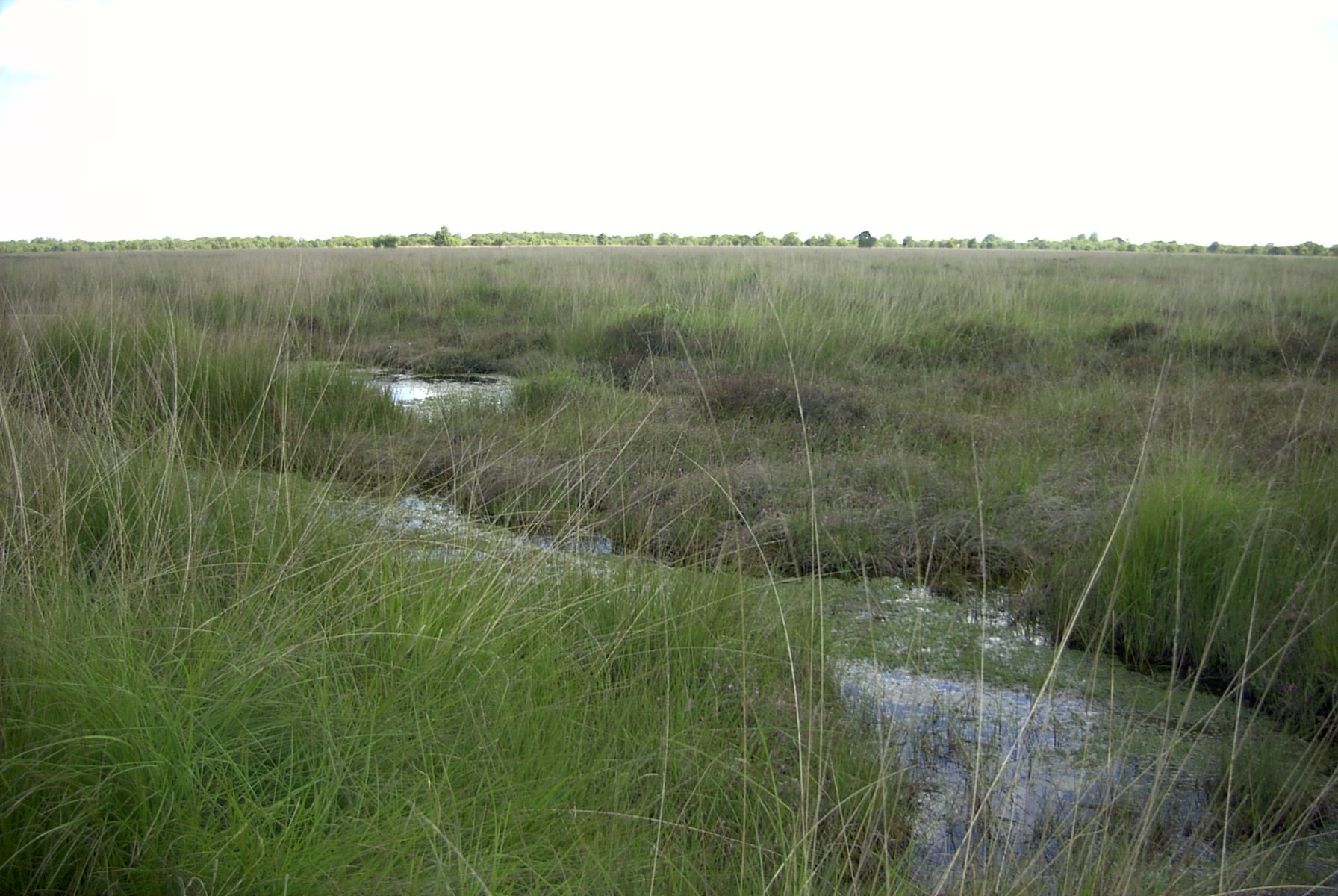
Ewiges Meer Nature Reserve, raised bog element of the remains of a bog in East Frisia

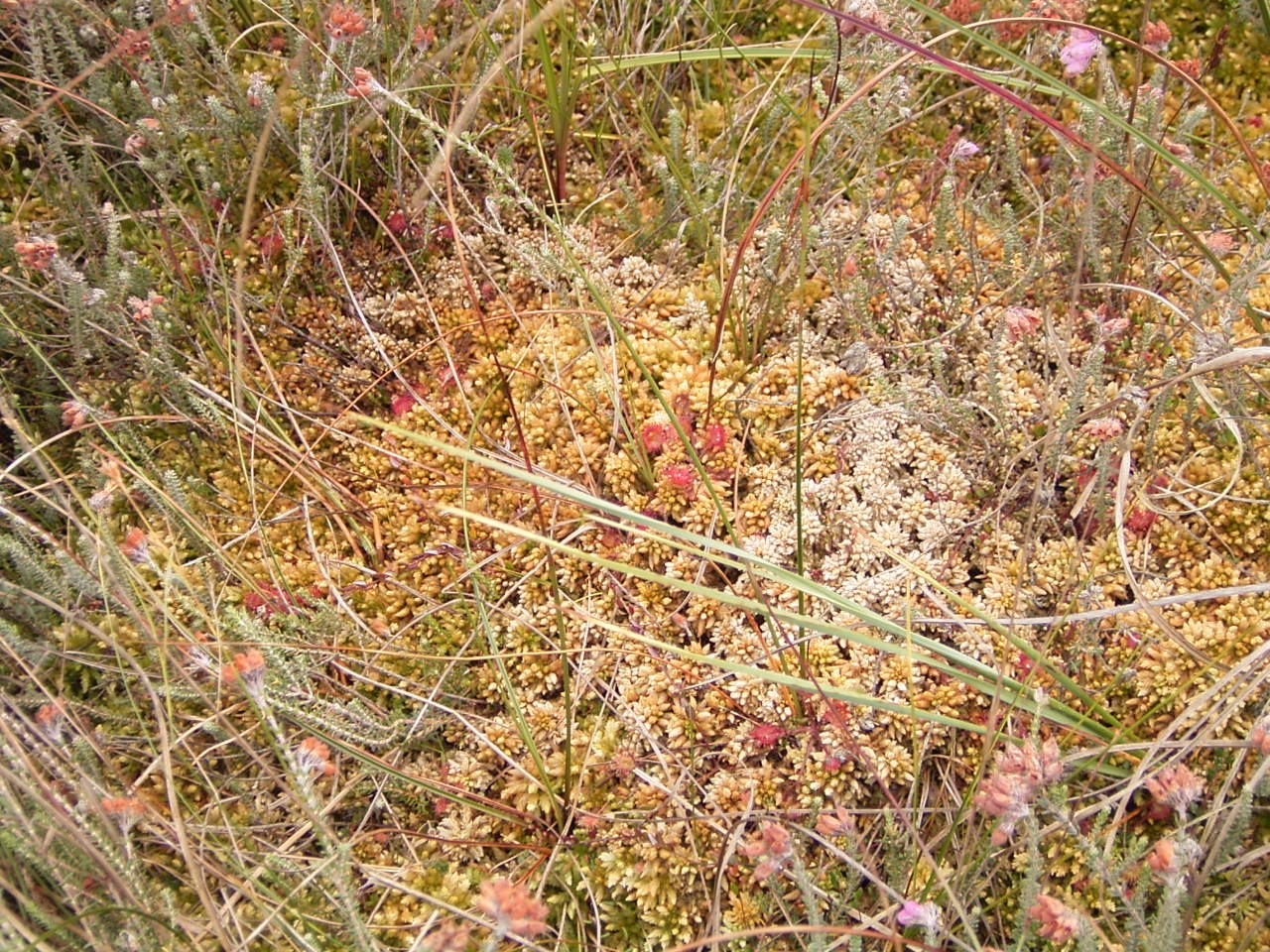
Peat moss floating mat on a silted-up raised bog kolk

Raised bogs, also called ombrotrophic bogs, are acidic, wet habitats that are poor in mineral salts and are home to flora and fauna that can cope with such extreme conditions. Raised bogs, unlike fens, are exclusively fed by precipitation (ombrotrophy) and from mineral salts introduced from the air. They thus represent a special type of bog, hydrologically, ecologically and in terms of their development history, in which the growth of peat mosses over centuries or millennia plays a decisive role. They also differ in character from blanket bogs which are much thinner and occur in wetter, cloudier climatic zones.

Raised bogs are very threatened by peat cutting and pollution by mineral salts from the surrounding land (due to agriculture and industry). The last great raised bog regions are found in western Siberia and Canada.

== Terminology ==
The term raised bog derives from the fact that this type of bog rises in height over time as a result of peat formation. They are like sponges of peat moss, full of water, that form a more or less dome shape in the landscape. In Germany, the term Hochmoor (lit. 'high bog') strictly refers only to the classical, lens-shaped bogs of northwest Germany. The bogs are not influenced by mineral-rich groundwater or surface water, but are fed exclusively by precipitation — mainly rainwater, hence their alternative German designation of Regenmoor or "rain-fed bog". Thus the latter refers to all bogs, not just those that are arched or only slightly arched, but which nevertheless are characterized by an extreme mineral salt deficiency and other resulting ecological properties.

== Formation and development ==
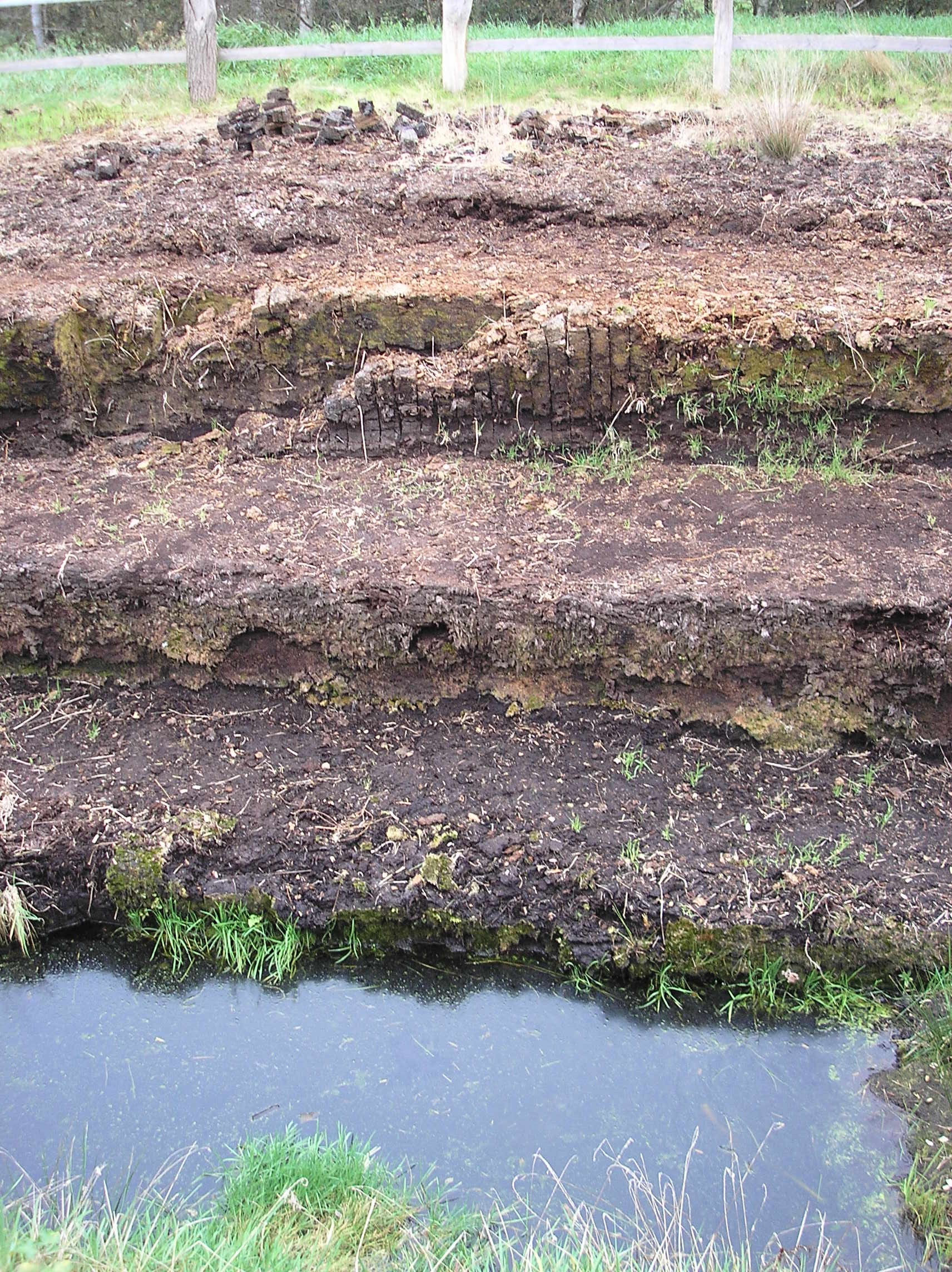
Layering of a raised bog: plant remains, white peat and black peat (from the top)

A living raised bog needs a moist, balanced climate in which to grow. The quantity of precipitation has to be greater than the water losses through discharge and evaporation. In addition, the precipitation must be evenly spread through the year.

Raised bogs in Europe have been developing for about 11,000 years, since the beginning of the Holocene and after the retreat of the last ice sheet. Regarding origins, a distinction is made between lake mires or 'siltation-formed raised bogs' (Verlandungshochmoore) and 'mire-formed raised bogs' (wurzelechte Hochmoore).

Lake mires emerged in a secondary process after the silting up of lakes or oxbows (see illustration on the right in the sequence). At first, fens emerged under the influence of groundwater (minerotrophy). Oxygen deficiencies and high acidity in the constantly moist substrate inhibited the decomposition of dead plant parts and led to peat formation. Thus the bog rises slowly above the groundwater level, hence its name. It becomes fed solely by rainwater, which is low in mineral salts, and has no access to salts in the groundwater.

By contrast, mire-formed raised bogs are created directly on the mineral substrate of low-salt areas without having been initially formed as fens (see figure on the left in the sequence). They are formed either as a primary bog due to the erosion of previously dry mineral soils, for example due to clearing, climate change or infiltration, or as a secondary process as a result of the growth of a raised bog on neighbouring mineral soil.

The formation of a typical raised bog is a very slow process, which lasts from centuries to a thousand years even in favourable, undisturbed conditions. Furthermore, there are a number of transitional and intermediate bogs, which in different ways combine characteristics of both raised bogs and fens. (See bog.)

The main constituents of the peat are rootless peat mosses that grow slowly in height whilst at the same time the lower layer becomes peat as air is excluded. Depending on the geographical location, various species of peat moss are involved in making a raised bog. The peat layer grows about a millimetre per year.

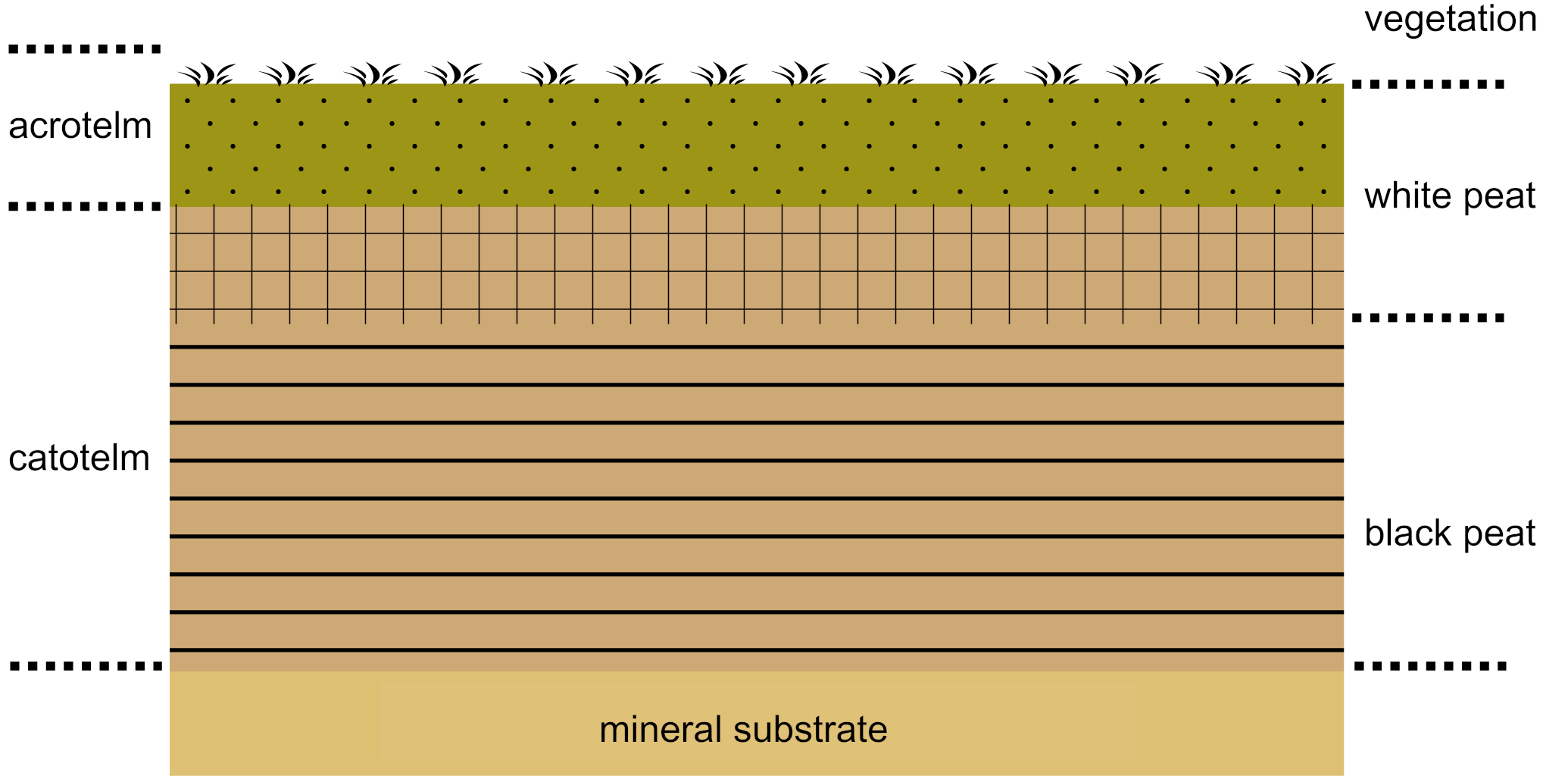
Structure of a growing bog

Growing bogs can be divided into two layers. The 'acrotelm' (Greek: akros = highest; telma = bog) is the upper part and includes the vegetation layer and the bog 'floor'. Here fresh organic substances (peat formation horizon) are created by the growth and dying of plant elements. The "catotelm" (Greek: kato = below) is the underlying water-saturated part with less biological activity. This layer is counted as a geological subsoil due to the small earth-forming processes that are still going on and is known as the peat preservation horizon (Torferhaltungshorizont). In raised bogs, the upper peat layer is called white peat, since it consists of largely undecomposed light brown peat mosses. The lower layer is black peat, which is already well humified and has a black-brown colour with still recognizable plant remains.

== Types and distribution ==
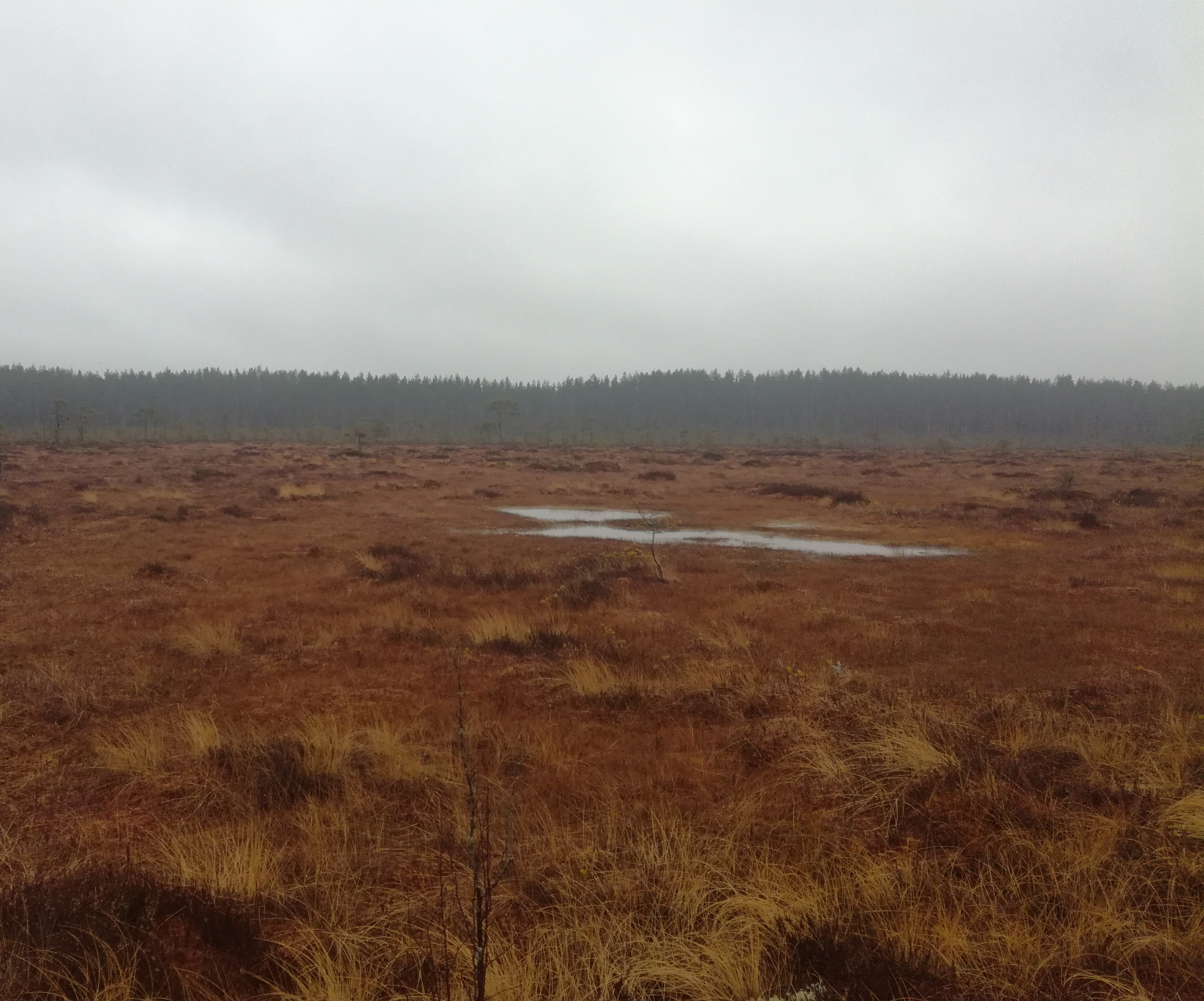
A raised bog called Punassuo ("Red Bog") in Teijo National Park, Finland

The formation of raised bogs depends on climate, that is to say the amount of precipitation and evaporation rate, which in turn are determined by temperature. Terrain influences water discharge and thus bog shape. This results in geographical limitations to raised bogs formation. Favourable conditions exist mainly in North America (Canada and Alaska), Northern Europe and Western Siberia, South America, Southeast Asia and in the Amazon Basin. In these regions, bogs of all kinds and peat deposits of four million square kilometres have been formed, 3% of the Earth's surface. In the southern hemisphere low-mineral-rich bogs are rarely formed from peat mosses. Only in the Tierra del Fuego do peat moss raised bogs exist. The most peaty countries in the tropics are found in Southeast Asia. In many cases it is not yet clear how these bogs have emerged as mosses are entirely absent here.

=== Coastal bogs ===
Coastal bogs (Planregenmoore) or Atlantic bogs, as their names suggest, tend to form close to the sea. In addition, in regions covered by blanket bog, there are also lightly convex coastal bogs with low energy surface relief in level locations. The distribution of coastal bogs in Europe extends from Ireland to the east via South Norway to Southwest Sweden and north to the Lofoten. In North America there are coastal bogs in the area of the Great Lakes (especially in Minnesota and Ontario). Coastal bogs are also fed exclusively by rain.

=== Plateau bogs ===
In the less oceanically influenced climatic regions of North-West Europe (lower precipitation), raised bogs take on the classical lens shape and are called plateau bogs or plateau raised bogs (Plateauregenmoore). They grow more strongly in the centre than at the margins. This results in the centre of the bog bulging, hence the name "raised bog". This bulging can be several metres high. As a result, the perimeter of the bog is more or less inclined, and is known as the rand. The sloping bog sides of larger bogs are traversed by drainage channels or soaks (Rüllen) through which excess water is discharged.

Other characteristic structures of these raised bogs are the flat, treeless raised bog core with its characteristic microrelief of shallow wet depressions or flarks (Schlenken) alternating with hummocks (Bülten) of drier peat moss. Larger accumulations of water in the middle of the bogs are called kolks or bog ponds (of humic acid-rich water); the wet area on the outer margins is known as a moat or lagg.

Genuine ombrotrophic bogs on the North German Plain are usually sharply divided into two layers: an underlying black peat layer, which is strongly decomposed, and an overlying white peat layer which is less decomposed. This difference is a result of changes in the hydrology of the bog. The white peat grew more rapidly under humid conditions than the black peat. This is attributed to a climate change with high precipitation and low evaporation around 1000 to 500 BC. As a result, the peat moss growth grew locally and the black peat/white peat boundary layer was formed, although this did not develop simultaneously in all raised bogs.

=== Mountain or upland bogs ===
Raised bogs also occur in precipitation-rich upland regions at the montane and, more rarely, alpine levels (i.e. above the tree line). As a result of the sloping terrain, they often have a characteristic, asymmetric or non-concentric appearance. Mountain or upland bogs may be topographically divided into:

- Plateau bogs on level ground
- Hillside bogs – bogs on hillsides which are not genuine percolating mires (Durchströmungsmoore); the upper parts of the bog are more strongly fed by incoming water and are usually flat. The lower parts are exclusively fed by rainwater and may be of considerable thickness. The lower rand is often very steep and there is usually no typical wet zone or lagg (see above). Kolks, shallow pondlets (Blänken) and soaks occur as in classic raised bogs.
- Saddle bogs – usually elongated bogs on mountain passes, which are partly fed by water from the flanking hillsides, are rare; their margins resemble hillside bogs, the central area is more like a plateau bog
- Summit and crest bogs – very rare

All these bog types may occur on the margins of lowland bogs i.e. fens, or transition into them.

=== Kermi bogs ===
Kermi bogs (Kermimoore, Schildhochmoore) or kermi raised bogs have only a slightly domed shape. The surface of the bog rises steadily from the broad lagg zone. Kermis have ridge-shaped hummocks of peat moss, that are aligned with the contours of the bog. The flarks or elongated depressions are generally tub-shaped and hardly distinguishable externally from kolks. In the central area of these bogs, there are always large kolks. In northern Russia and western Siberia, kermis frequently occur in giant complexes where the bogs have grown into one another. Kermis are also found in Finland in the central and northern boreal forest zone.

=== String bogs ===
String bogs or aapa fens (Aapamoore or Strangmoore) are typically found on the northern fringes of the distribution area for raised bogs, in the sub-polar zone, north of the 66th latitude in the northern hemisphere. Here, raised bogs only occur as islands within wetlands supplied by mineral soil water. On level ground these islands are irregularly distributed; on hillsides they form ridges parallel to the contours and at right angles to line of slope. The ridges separate boggy hollows of mineral soil known by the Finnish word, rimpis. The main distribution area for string bogs are the Scandinavian hills, central Finland, Karelia and north Siberia. In North America, Alaska is the main location for string bogs, thanks to its cold continental climate. Frost action plays an important role in these bogs. On the ridges or hummocks, ground ice is found until early summer.

=== Palsas ===
Palsa bogs (Palsamoore or Palsenmoore) are found on the margins of the Arctic permafrost soils (tundra). Here the ridges of the string bogs can grow into hummocks several metres high. Like string bogs, the so-called palsas frequently lie within peatlands fed by mineral soil water. Some are surrounded by water-filled, ditch-like hollows. Peat formation is limited; these bogs are peat deposits from warmer, interglacial periods and did not experience frost heaving of their inner core of ice until the climate became colder. These ice lenses increase in size from year to year as a result of freeze-thaw processes of the surrounding water. The low temperatures prevent full decomposition of the organic material.

=== Polygonal bogs ===
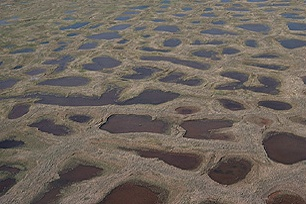
A polygonal bog comprising flat ponds with the characteristic polygonal structure

Polygonal bogs (Polygonmoore) are widespread on the Arctic and sub-Arctic plains of Siberia and North America and cover vast areas. They are associated with patterned peatland and ice wedges. A scanty layer of peat-forming vegetation can occur in the inner honeycomb-shaped areas of this frost pattern terrain (cryoturbation) and are fed during the short summers with sufficient moisture, because the meltwater is prevented from draining away by the raised polygonal margins. The peat layers can attain a thickness of 0.3 to 1 m (1.0–3.3 ft).

== Distribution in the Northern Hemisphere ==
=== Asia ===
The west Siberian raised bog area covers 700,000 km^{2} (270,000 mi^{2}). The large bogs have domes in the centre up to 10 m (33 ft) high. They are predominantly of the kermi bog type. They represent probably the most important type of raised bog on earth. The Vasyugan Swamp in this region, is the largest bog system on earth and covers more than 50,000 km^{2} (19,000 mi^{2}). It is estimated to contain over 14 billion tonnes of peat deposits.

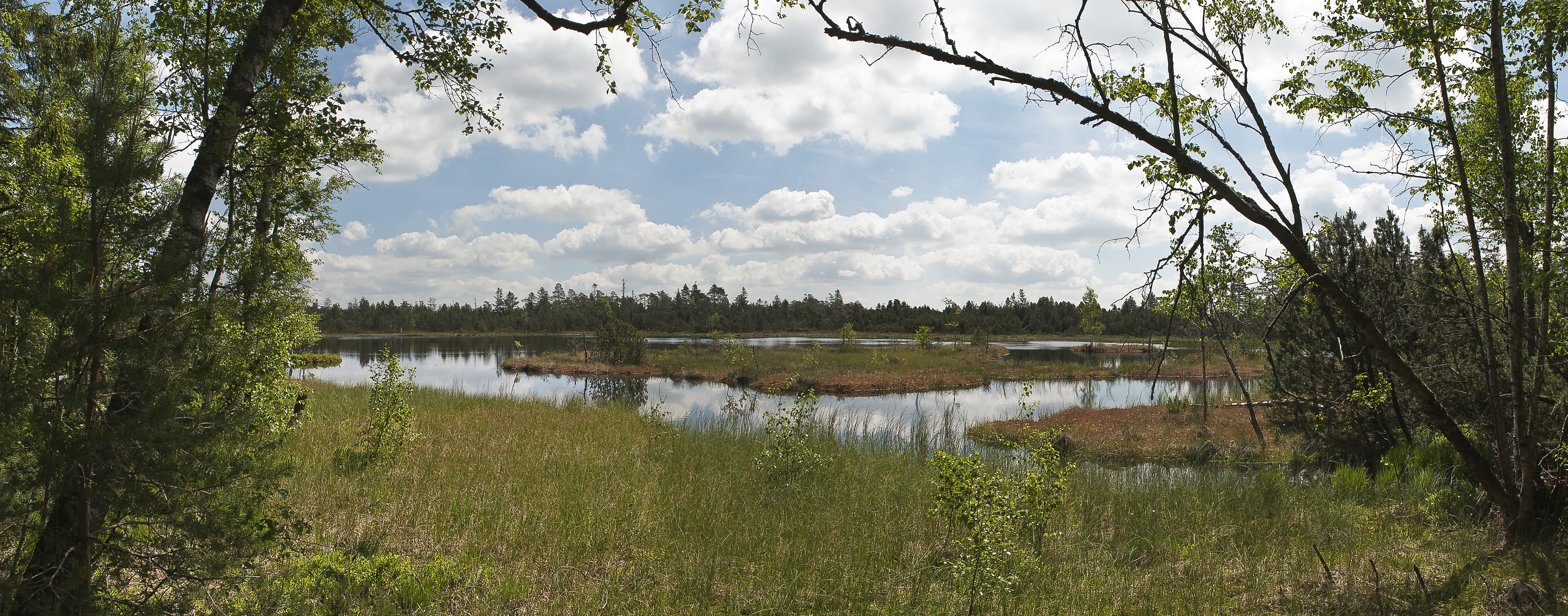
A raised bog kolk, the Wildsee, near Bad Wildbad in the Black Forest

=== Europe ===
The largest central European raised bog areas are the southern North Sea coastal area and the Alpine Foreland. As in North America there is a succession of raised bog types along the line of descent towards the ocean, from northwest to southeast. As a result of peat use, raised bogs have been harvested for peat and cultivated, apart from a few remnants (less than 10% of the original area). The largest contiguous raised bog in western Europe was the Bourtange Moor, which originally covered an area of about 2,300 km^{2} including the Dutch portion, but only small sections remain. The largest remaining raised bog in northern Europe is the 76 km^{2} Lille Vildmose. Other large raised bogs are the Teufelsmoor northeast of Bremen, the Vehnemoor (exhausted) and the Esterweger Dose (formerly about 80 km^{2}, exhausted) between Oldenburg and Papenburg. The raised bogs of the Central Uplands of the Harz, Solling, Thuringian Forest (Großer Beerberg, Schneekopf - Teufelsbad, Fichtenkopf, Saukopf), Giant Mountains, Ore Mountains, Fichtel and Rhön (Black Moor, Red Moor) are, by contrast, comparatively small. In the Black Forest the Wildseemoor has been protected and, in the Vosges on le Tanet, north of the Col de la Schlucht a large area has been protected. The Alpine Foreland, which was formed by ice-age glaciation, is also rich in peatland. The Wurzacher Ried (Haidgauer Regenmoorschild) is considered the largest and best preserved raised bog in central Europe. Other raised bogs and peatland areas include the Federsee, the High Fens on the Germano-Belgian border, the Ewiges Meer near Aurich and the Lengener Meer near Wiesmoor. In 2003, Estonia exported 3.6 million m^{3} of peat for west European garden use, more than 60% of the state production. In Lithuania 60% of the usable peat area has been prepared for extraction or is already exhausted.

==== Ireland ====
Lough Lurgeen Bog and Glenamaddy Turlough Bog contains very good examples of the Annex 1 habitats: active raised bog, turlough (both priority habitats), degraded raised bog (capable of regeneration) and vegetation of depressions (rhynchosporion). These habitats are considered to be among the best examples in Ireland due to their relatively large size and the generally low levels of disturbance. In the Natura form compiled for the site active raised bog was given a rating of A (Excellent value) which emphasises the importance of the site. Raised bog habitats are now very rare in Europe and it has recently been estimated that the Republic of Ireland contains 50% of the relatively intact oceanic raised bog systems in Europe.

The site contains the second largest area of intact raised bog surface in Ireland. The combination of raised bog, oligotrophic lake and turlough habitats is unique in Ireland and thus the entire system is very important from both a hydrological and ecological perspective.

=== North America ===
A region of peatland extends from Alaska in the west to the coast of the Atlantic in the east, and is comparable in size to that of West Siberia. A zone of domed raised bogs adjoins the zones of palsa bogs and string fens. In the direction of descent towards the ocean, blanket bogs occur east of Hudson Bay. These are superseded towards the west by plateau bogs in the area of the large lakes and, eventually, by kermi bogs.

== Literature ==
- M. Succow, M. Jeschke: Moore in der Landschaft. Entstehung, Haushalt, Lebewelt, Verbreitung, Nutzung und Erhaltung der Moore. Thun, Frankfurt/Main 1990, ISBN 3-87144-954-7
- H. Joosten, M. Succow: Landschaftsökologische Moorkunde. E. Schweizerbart’sche Verlagsbuchhandlung, Stuttgart, 2001, ISBN 3-510-65198-7
- Heinz Ellenberg: Vegetation Mitteleuropas mit den Alpen in ökologischer, dynamischer und historischer Sicht. Ulmer, Stuttgart, 1996, ISBN 3-8252-8104-3
- J. Eigner, E. Schmatzler: Handbuch des Hochmoorschutzes. Kilda, Greven, 1991, ISBN 3-88949-176-6
- Claus-Peter Hutter (ed.), Alois Kapfer, Peter Poschlod: Sümpfe und Moore - Biotope erkennen, bestimmen, schützen. Weitbrecht, Stuttgart / Vienna / Berne, 1997, ISBN 3-522-72060-1
- H. Joosten: Denken wie ein Hochmoor. Hydrologische Selbstregulation von Hochmooren und deren Bedeutung für Wiedervernässung und Restauration. In: Telma. Hannver, 23.1993, pp. 95–115, ISSN 0340-4927
- Catherine O'Connell: Conservation and Management of Raised Bogs in Ireland. 14th International Peat Congress, 1998.
- F. Overbeck: Botanisch-geologische Moorkunde. Wachholtz, Neumunster, 1975, ISBN 3-529-06150-6
