= Black Moor (Rhön) =

Highmoor in Germany

Coordinates: 50°30′51″N 10°3′54″E

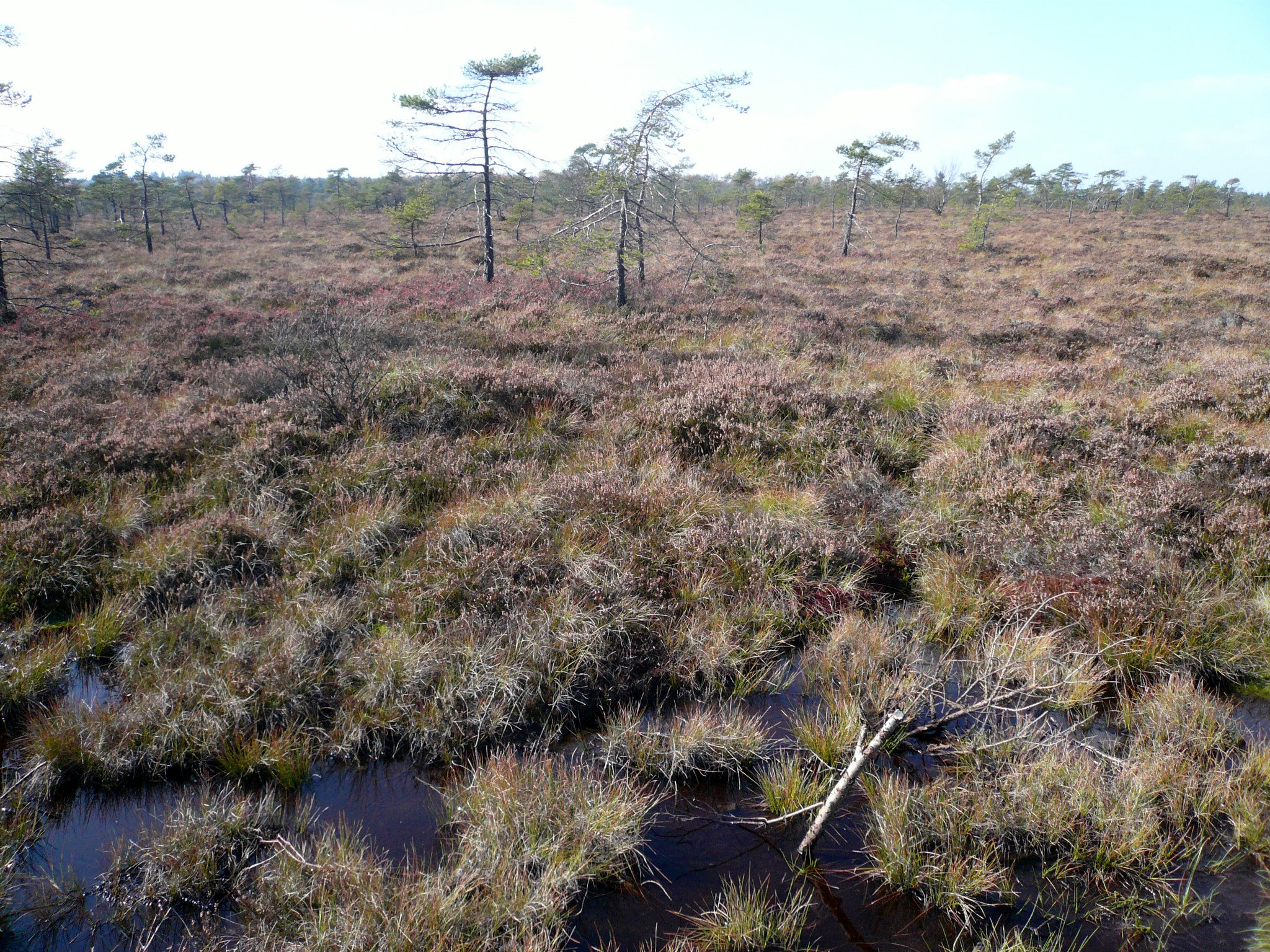
The Black Moor

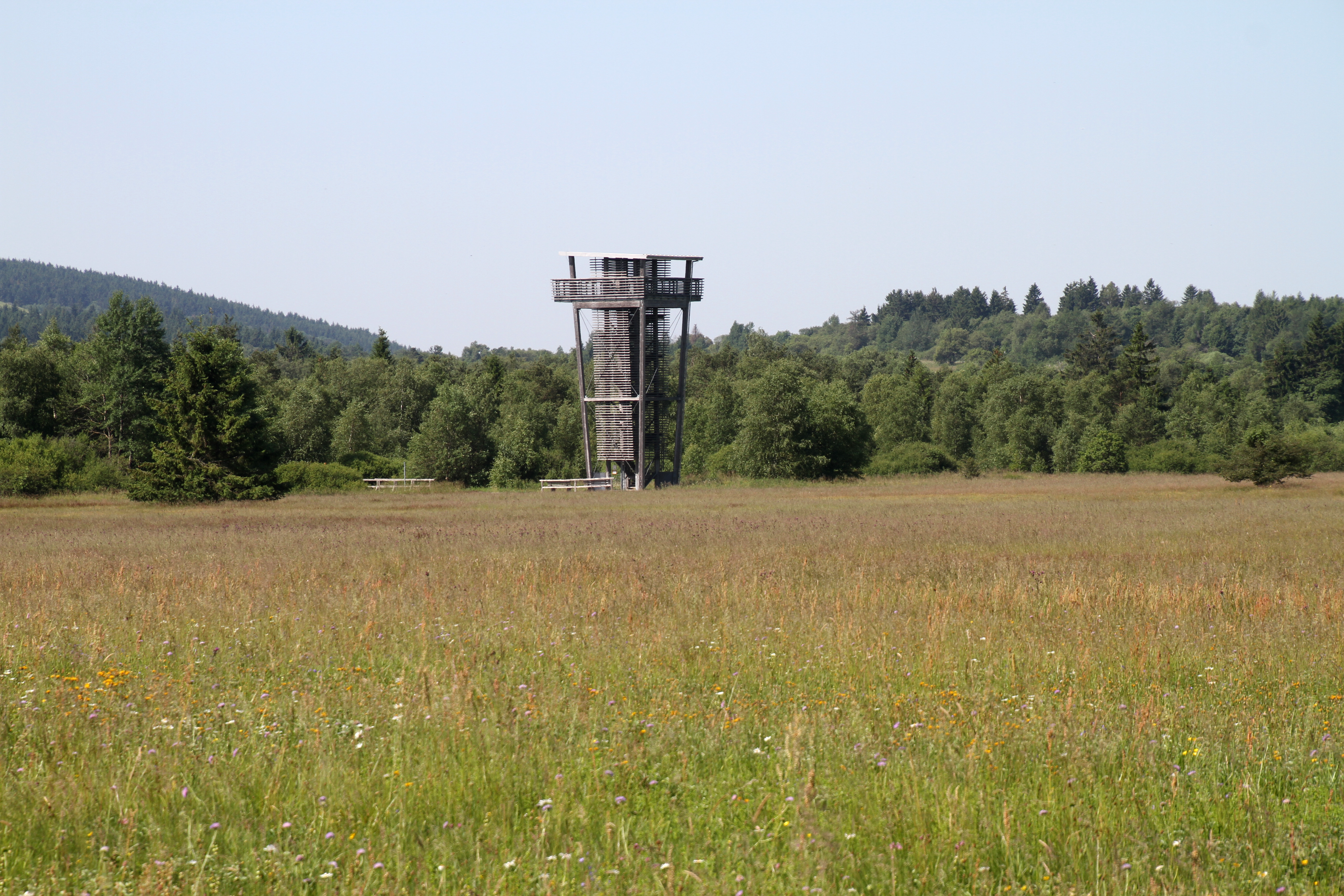
Observation tower

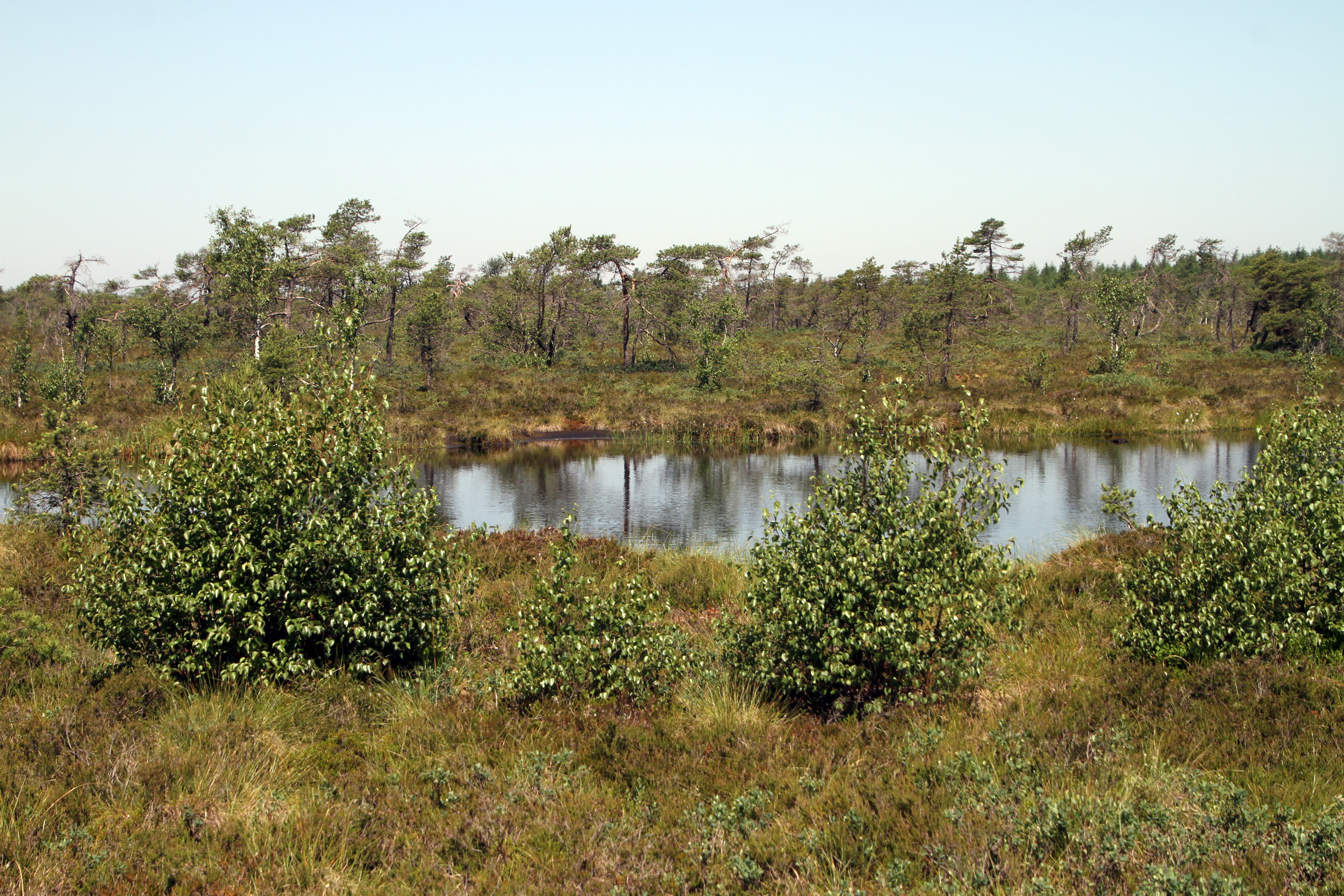
Flark

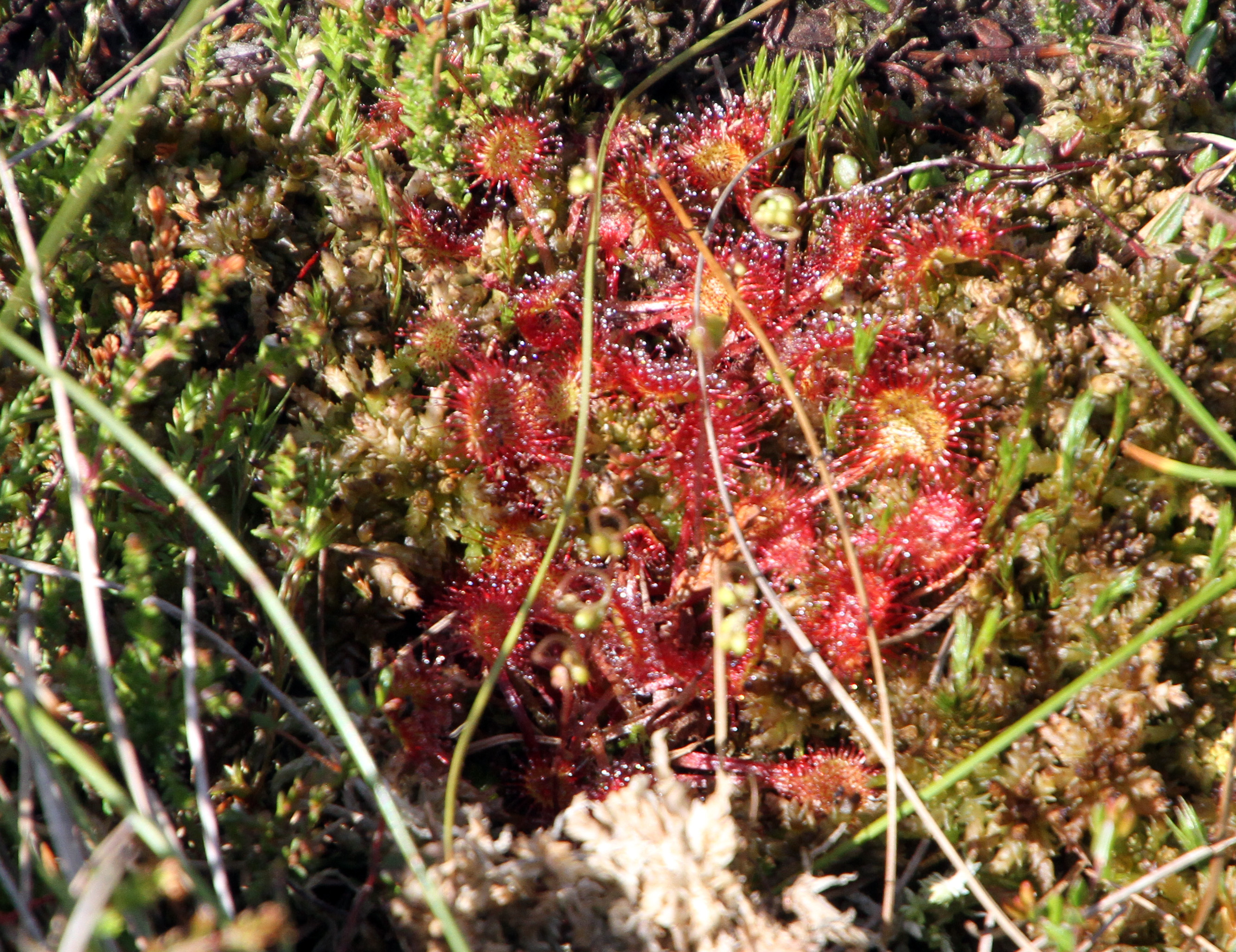
Drosera

The Black Moor (German: Schwarzes Moor) is an important internationally recognised wetland located in the Bavarian Rhön Mountains at the tripoint of the German states of Hesse, Thuringia and Bavaria. It is part of UNESCO's Rhön Biosphere Reserve and has an area of 66.4 hectares. It is thus the largest bog complex in the Rhön. Much of the moor is a largely undisturbed and intact raised bog. It is part of the Europe-wide conservation system, Natura 2000, and one of the most important raised bogs in Central Europe. The Black Moor lies on the watershed between the Rhine and Weser rivers. In 2007 the Black Moor was included in the List of the 100 most beautiful geotopes in Bavaria.

The Black Moor is an eccentric, cupola-shaped, raised bog. Its surface appearance resembles that of the northern kermi bogs. From its central plateau which lies near the higher edge of the bog in the north, where the peat is up to 8 metres thick in places, the surface of the terrain falls away on all sides. The central plateau forms an almost rectangular area with a length of about 800 metres from northwest to southeast and a width of about 400 metres. On the steepest slopes there are hollows running parallel to the contours: elongated, sharply defined troughs known as flarks (Schlenken). These are up to 50 metres long and between one and three metres deep.

== Location ==
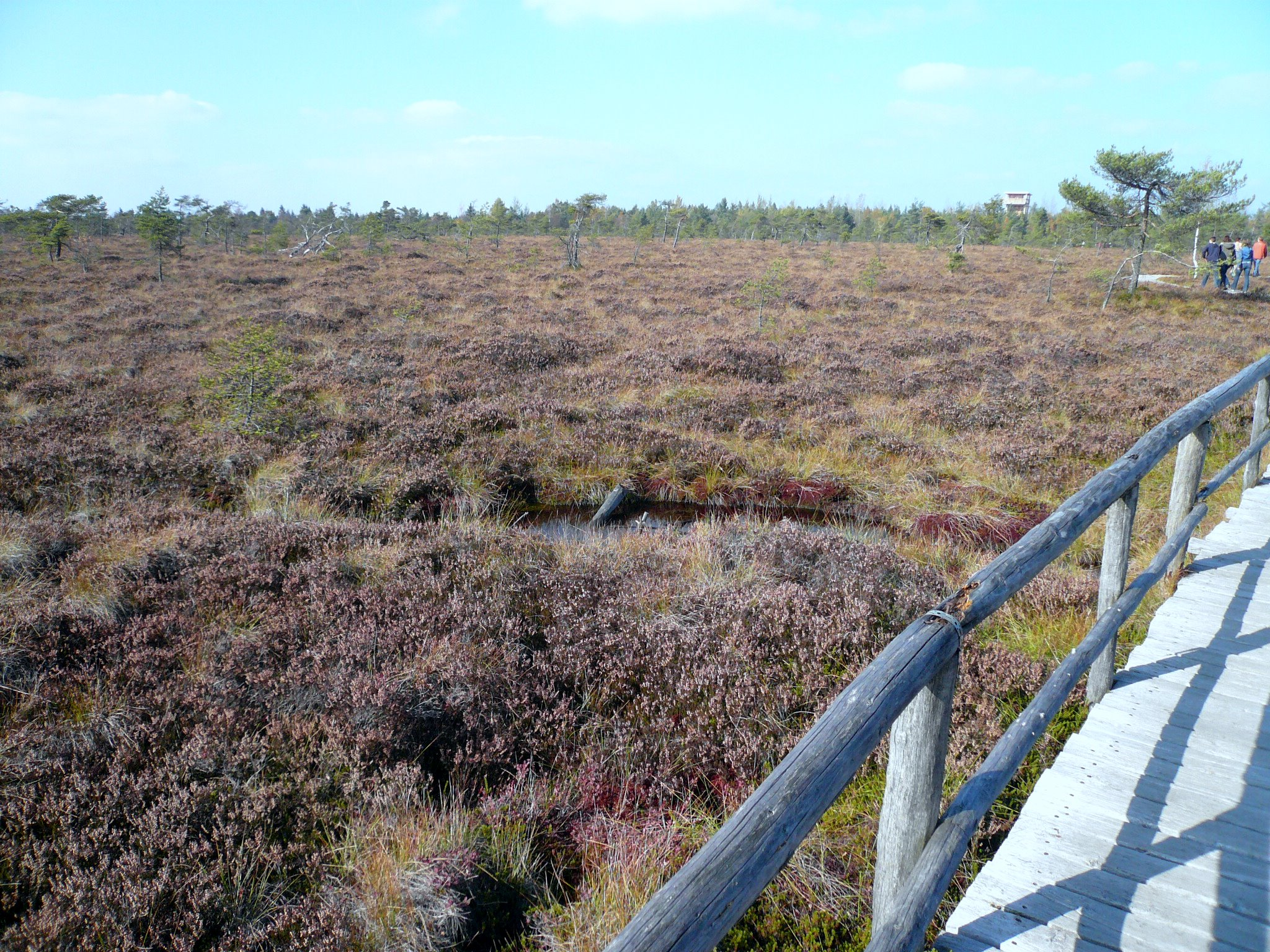
Central part of the moor

The Black Moor lies in the Lower Franconian parish of Hausen, six kilometres from Fladungen on the High Rhön Road and on the state road, ST 2287, from Seiferts, one kilometre southeast of the border with Thuringia and two kilometres east of the border with Hesse. It lies at an elevation of 770 to 782 metres above sea level (NN) in a shallow hollow that slopes gently southeast on the upper slopes of the 805-metre-high Querenberg, whose summit is about one kilometre to the west.

The bog is drained mainly by the Eisgraben, twelve metres lower, to the south. This stream empties into the Streu, six kilometres east and 400 metres lower down, its waters forming part of the drainage basin of the River Rhine. Another stream drains the bog into the Hessian Ulster, which is three kilometres to the west and just under 300 metres lower and belongs to the Weser basin.

== Name ==
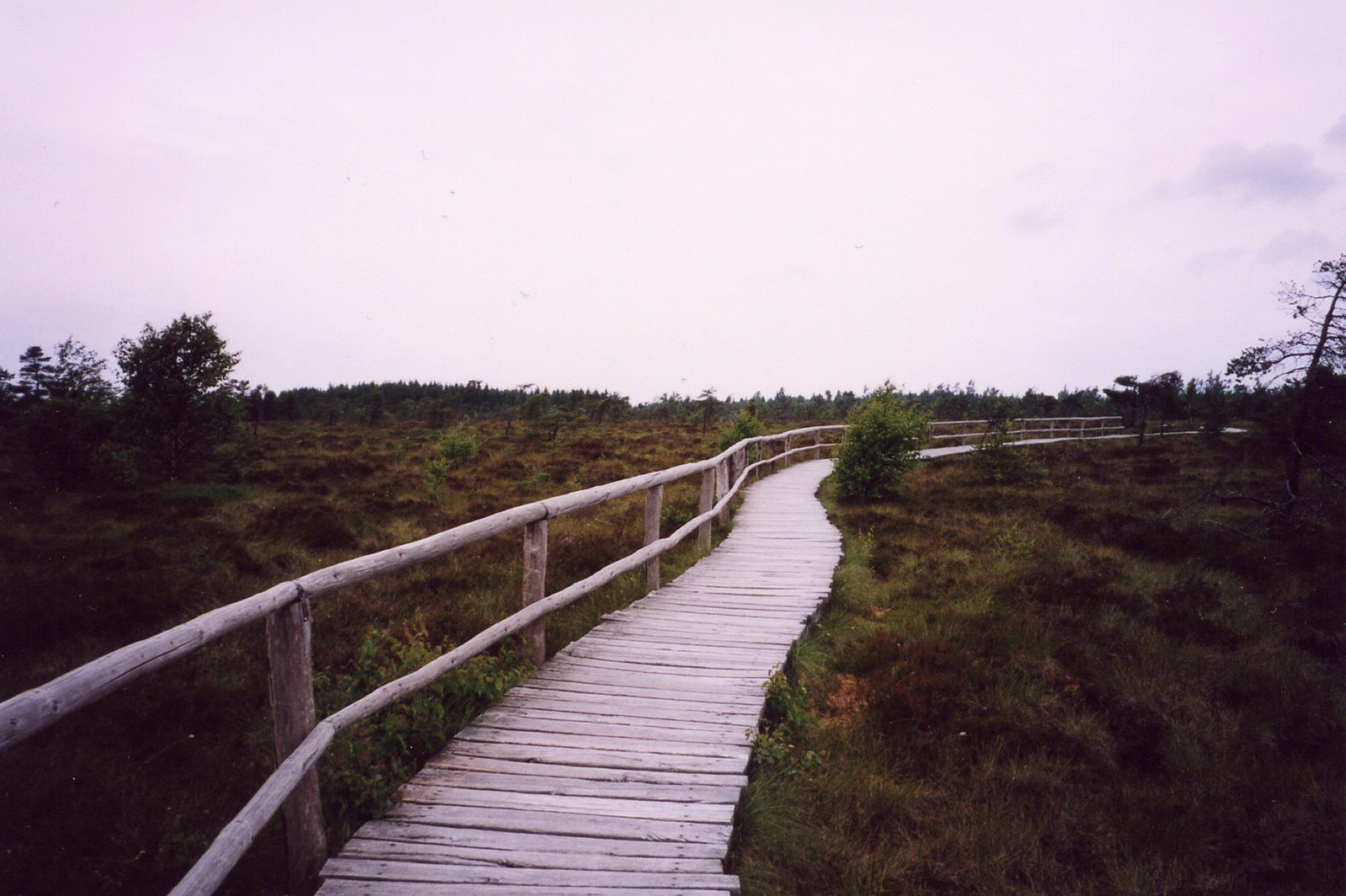
The moor pathway

The Black Moor, along with the Red Moor, is one of the larger moors in the High Rhön, whose name, according to tradition, comes from the colour of the original vegetation. The vicar cooperator of Simmershausen, Franz Anton Jäger, a keen naturalist, wrote in his letters about the High Rhoene of Franconia, published in 1803, that the Black Moor was much wetter than the Red Moor. As a result, the red Magellan's Peatmoss (Sphagnum magellanicum), the plant that gave the Red Moor its name and which also grew in the Black Moor, became waterlogged as soon as it germinated, became mouldy and black, thus giving rise to the name of the Black Moor. Even today the name appears apt.

== Literature ==
- Naturpark und Biosphärenreservat Bayerische Rhön e. V. (pub.): Naturlehrpfad Schwarzes Moor. 2003.
- Zweckverband Naturpark Bayerische Rhön (pub.): Naturlehrpfad Schwarzes Moor. Rötter Druck und Verlag GmbH, Bad Neustadt, 1988.
- Willy Kiefer: Die Moore der Rhön. Verlag Parzeller GmbH & Co. KG, Fulda, 1996, ISBN 3-7900-0269-0.
- Joachim S. Hohmann: Landvolk unterm Hakenkreuz. Agrar- und Rassenpolitik in der Rhön. Ein Beitrag zur Landesgeschichte Bayerns, Hessens und Thüringens, Frankfurt/M., Berlin, Bern, New York, Paris, Wien 1992, ISBN 978-3-631-45093-2.
- Max Mölter: Die Hochrhönstraße. Verlag Parzeller Fulda, 5th edition, 1986, ISBN 3-7900-0149-X.
- Heribert Kramm: Die Hochrhön. Verlag Parzeller GmbH & Co. KG, Fulda, 2006, ISBN 3-7900-0305-0.
- Theodor Gies: Vegetation und Ökologie des Schwarzen Moores (Rhön) unter besonderer Berücksichtigung des Kationengehaltes. Dissertationes Botanicae, 1972; ISBN 978-3-768-20857-4.
- Udo Bohn: Die Vegetation der Hohen Rhön – Gesellschaftsinventar, Bewertung, aktuelle Gefährdungen, Erhaltungsmaßnahmen. Natur und Landschaft. Bonn-Bad Godesberg, 1981.
- Gisbert Große-Brauckmann: Moore in der Rhön als Beispiele für Entstehung, Entwicklung und Ausbildungsformen von Mooren und ihre Probleme heute. Beitrag in Naturkunde Osthessen. Fulda, 1996.
- LIFE-Projekt Rhön der EU (pub.): Naturschätze der Rhön: Hochmoore. Kaltensundheim, 1997.
- Jürgen Holzhausen, Ernst Hettche: Hochmoore im Biosphärenreservat Rhön. Verlag Richard Mack, Mellrichstadt, 1996, ISBN 3-9802436-2-1.
