= Bog pond =

Type of waterbody

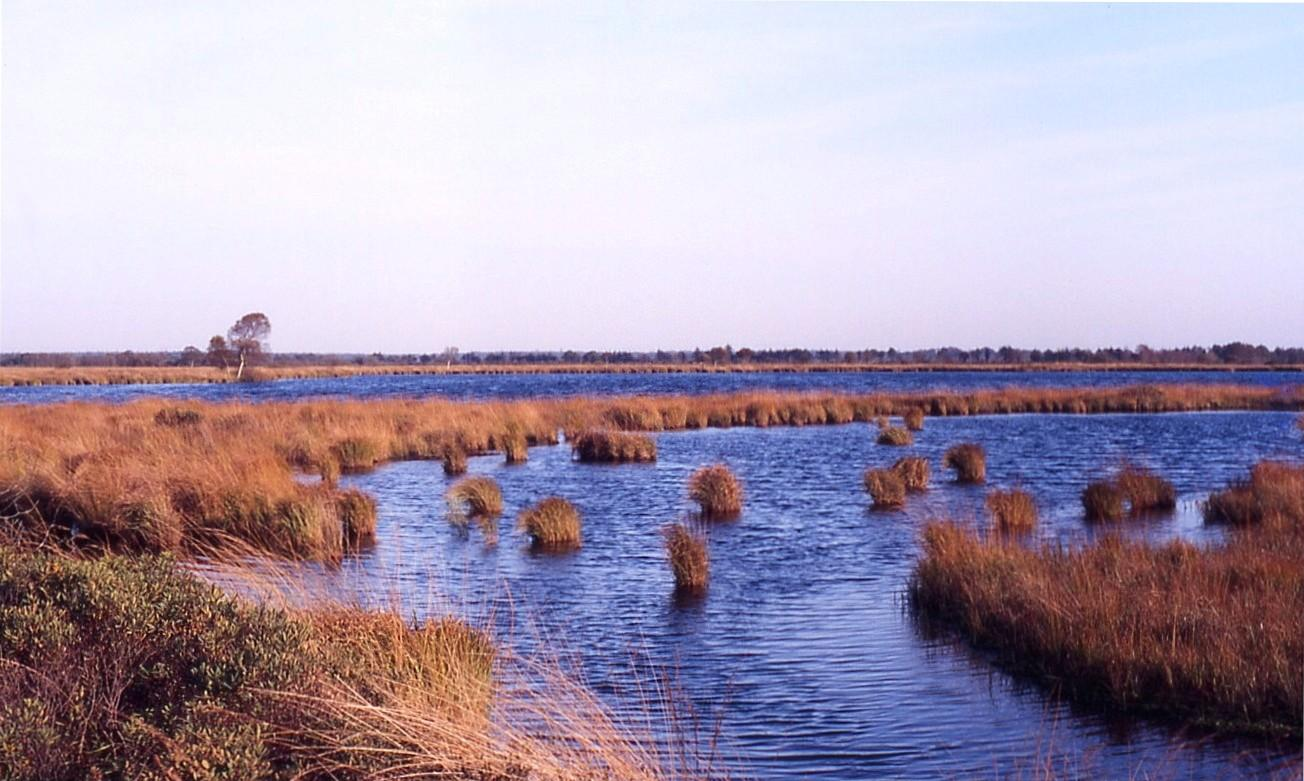
The Dobbe, a bog kolk in the Ewiges Meer Nature Reserve

A bog pond (German: Moorauge) is a waterbody in the middle of a raised or kettle bog, formerly also in percolating mires (Durchströmungsmooren). It is also called a bog pool, bog eye, raised bog kolk, bog kolk or just kolk.

Bog ponds owe their existence to the growth of the bog body and are thus of biogenic origin.

Brown bog ponds are surrounded by peat and receive their water exclusively from precipitation or from the large rain storage capacity of raised bogs. Such kolks generally represent the non-evaporating excess water of a bog. The central waterbody of these bogs exhibit almost no sedimentation.

The accumulation of nutrients can lead to the formation of floating mats. Their vegetation differs from that of other structures in the bog. Usually the edges of the kolk are more nutrient-rich as a result of mineralisation processes caused by wave and wind action. Here woody plants, such as downy birch (Betula pubescens), and other species of plant, e.g. purple moor grass (Molinia caerulea), may establish, that otherwise are missing on the central areas of intact bogs. The bog water is brown, nutrient-poor, humic acid rich, and lime-free (dystrophic).

== Literature ==
- Fritz Overbeck: Botanisch-geologische Moorkunde. Unter besonderer Berücksichtigung der Moore Nordwestdeutschlands als Quellen zur Vegetations-, Klima- und Siedlungsgeschichte. Wachholtz, Neumunster, 1975, ISBN 3-529-06150-6.
- Michael Succow, Lebrecht Jeschke: Moore in der Landschaft. Entstehung, Haushalt, Lebewelt, Verbreitung, Nutzung und Erhaltung der Moore. 2nd edn., Deutsch, Thun etc., 1990, ISBN 3-87144-954-7.
