= Red Moor =

Red Moor may refer to:

- Red Moor (nature reserve), a nature reserve and SSSI in Cornwall, England
- Red Moor (Rhön), an important wetland in Hesse, Germany
- Red Moors, an Italian political party
