= Kepler Mire =

Coordinates: 45°31′50″S 167°41′01″E

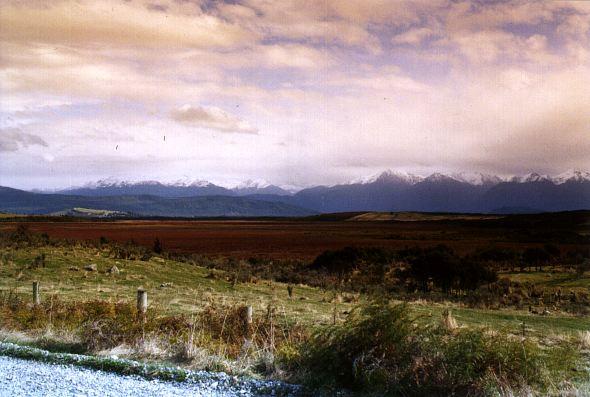
The Kepler Mire / Dead Marshes viewpoint, New Zealand

The Kepler Mire, or Dismal Swamp east of Lake Manapouri, is the largest wetland in the Te Anau basin complex in New Zealand, covering more than 900 ha (altitude 220–230 m). Like the neighbouring mountain range, it is named in honour of astronomer Johannes Kepler.

Its dome is about three metres higher at the centre than at the margins. The peat development reaches depths of up to 4.7 m. The total volume of peat in this mire is estimated at 20.5 million cubic metres.

The Kepler Mire is internationally biologically significant because it is the most extensive pool system of the string bog form found in New Zealand.

The best public viewing is from the Mount York Road, some 2 km from the Highway 95 intersection.

== In popular culture ==
The Mire was filmed by helicopter for the Peter Jackson film The Lord of the Rings: The Two Towers, in which it was used to portray the Dagorlad Battlefield or Dead Marshes.
