= Acrotelm =

Peat bog layer

The acrotelm is one of two distinct layers in undisturbed peat bogs. It overlies the catotelm. The boundary between the two layers is defined by the transition from peat containing living plants (acrotelm) to peat containing dead plant material (catotelm). This typically coincides with the lowest level of the water table. To lower the water table before harvesting, ditching is performed first.

== Natural peatlands ==
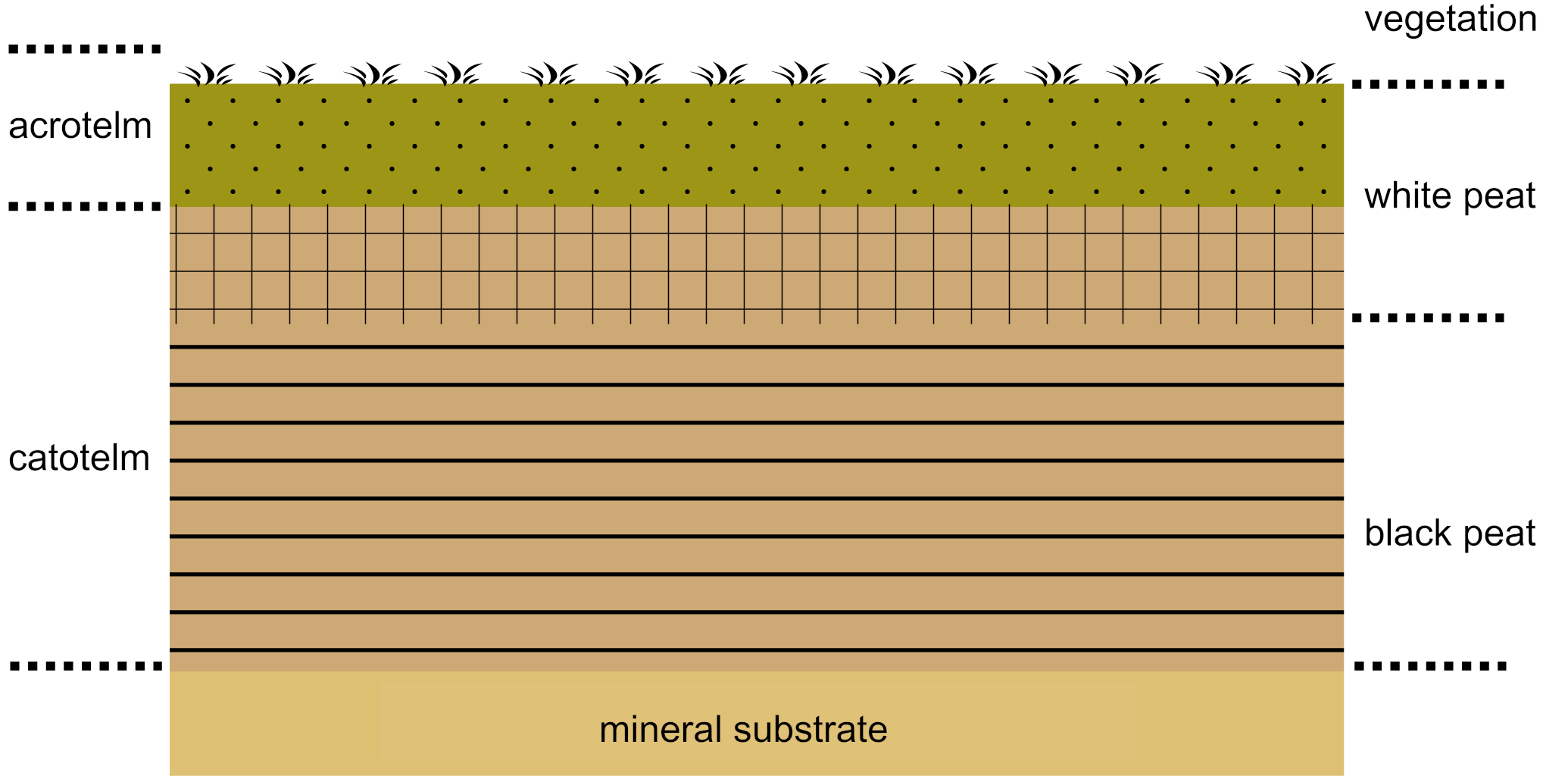
Structure of a peat bog showing the acrotelm overlying the catotelm

Fluctuations in the position of the water table in a peat bog occur within the acrotelm, and hence conditions may vary from aerobic to anaerobic with time.

Where there are extensive geological fluctuations in the peatland surface, the depth of the acrotelm may change fundamentally over a couple of meters of distance. In general, the acrotelm has a higher hydraulic conductivity and a lower bulk density than the catotelm. Other characteristics are shared by these two zones.

== Mined peatlands ==
After ditching, the acrotelm becomes thicker and more effective, drying the peat and simplifying harvesting. Drainage and subsidence lower the elevation of the peat surface, significantly lowering the soil's hydraulic conductivity.

=== Importance of atmospheric deposition ===
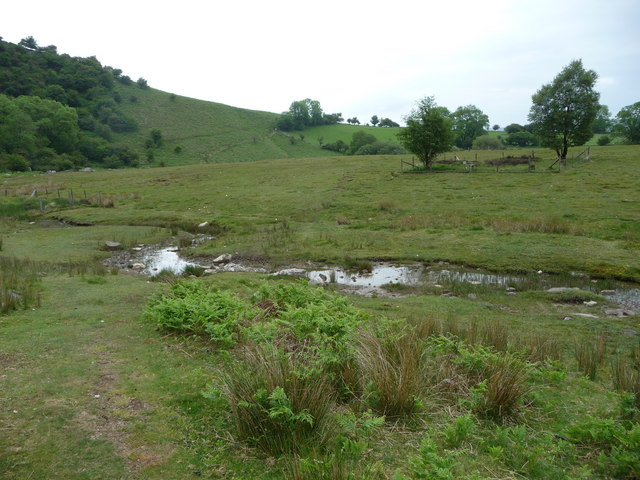
Ombrotrophic Bogs

Completely developed acrotelm, only found in ombrotrophic bogs, make it possible to study atmospheric deposition and how it affects ecosystems. Through the relatively quick disintegration of the acrotelm, only a small portion of the total nutrients locked up in the plant material are mineralized, making them available for additional plant development inclusive of bacterial and fungal activity.

== See also ==
- Mire
- Raised bog
- Swamp
