= Order of Merit of Brandenburg =

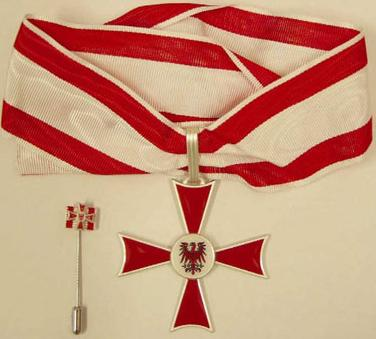
- Type: Civil order of merit
- Awarded for: Outstanding contributions to the state of Brandenburg
- Country: Germany
- Presented by: the Minister-President of Brandenburg
- Established: 10 July 2003
- First award: 14 June 2005

Highlights
- Total: 108
- Ribbon bar of the order

The Order of Merit of Brandenburg (German: Verdienstorden des Landes Brandenburg) is a civil order of merit, and the highest award of the German State of Brandenburg. The award is presented by the Minister-President of Brandenburg.

== Notable recipients ==
- Rolf-Dieter Amend
- Kathrin Boron
- Günter de Bruyn
- Jürgen Eschert
- Hermann von Richthofen
- Wolfgang Kohlhaase
- Manfred Kurzer
- Jutta Lau
- Henry Maske
- Siegfried Matthus
- Werner Otto
- Hasso Plattner
- Matthias Platzeck
- Michael Succow
- Adele Stolte
- Heinz Durr
- Hannah Pick-Goslar
