= Lagg (landform) =

Wet zone on perimeter of peatland or bog

A lagg, also called a moat, is the very wet zone on the perimeter of peatland or a bog where water from the adjacent upland collects and flows slowly around the main peat mass.

== Description ==
A lagg is an area of wetland, especially at the edge of raised bogs, in which water collects. It is often markedly different from the terrain either side and may consist of a morass of shrubs and murky water.

In addition to water gathered from surrounding uplands, the lagg also picks up water flowing down from the domed centre of a raised bog through small channels - soaks or water tracks - to the steeply sloping shoulder or rand of the bog. At the foot of the rand, the water collects and meets the water of the surrounding area on the boundary between the peat soil and mineral soil.

== Literature ==
- Johnson, Charles W. Bogs of the Northeast. London: University Press of New England, 1985. ISBN 0-87451-325-1.
- Heinrich Walter, Siegmar-W. Breckle (1986), "Spezielle Ökologie der Gemäßigten und Arktischen Zonen Euro-Nordasiens", Ökologie der Erde (in German), vol. Bd 3, Stuttgart: Gustav Fischer, p. 460, ISBN 3-437-20310-X
