= String bog =

Bog consisting of ridges and islands

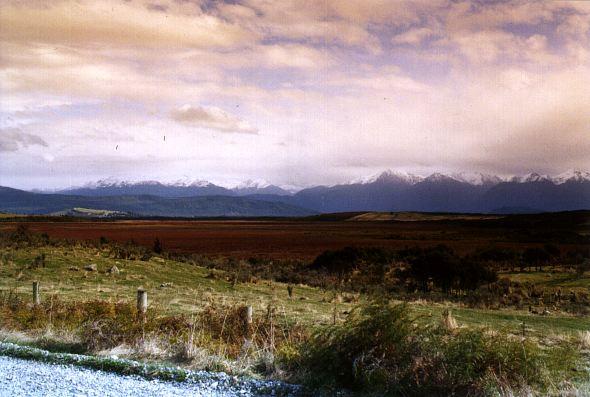
The Kepler Mire, a string bog in New Zealand.

A string bog or string mire is a bog consisting of slightly elevated ridges and islands, with woody plants, alternating with flat, wet sedge mat areas. String bogs occur on slightly sloping surfaces, with the ridges at right angles to the direction of water flow. They are an example of patterned vegetation.

String bogs are also known as aapa moors or aapa mires (from Finnish aapasuo) or Strangmoor (from the German).

A string bog has a pattern of narrow (2–3 meters wide), low (less than 1 meter high) ridges oriented at right angles to the direction of drainage with wet depressions or pools occurring between the ridges. The water and peat are very low in nutrients because the water has been derived from other ombrotrophic wetlands, which receive all of their water and nutrients from precipitation rather than from streams or springs. The peat thickness is greater than 1 meter.

String bogs are features associated with periglacial climates, where the temperature results in long periods of subzero temperatures. The active layer exists as a frozen ground for long periods and melts in the spring thaw. Slow melting produces characteristic mass movement processes and features associated with specific periglacial environments.

== See also ==
- Raised bog
- Blanket bog
- Flark
- Marsh
