= Ewiges Meer =

Lake in Eversmeer, Lower Saxony, Germany

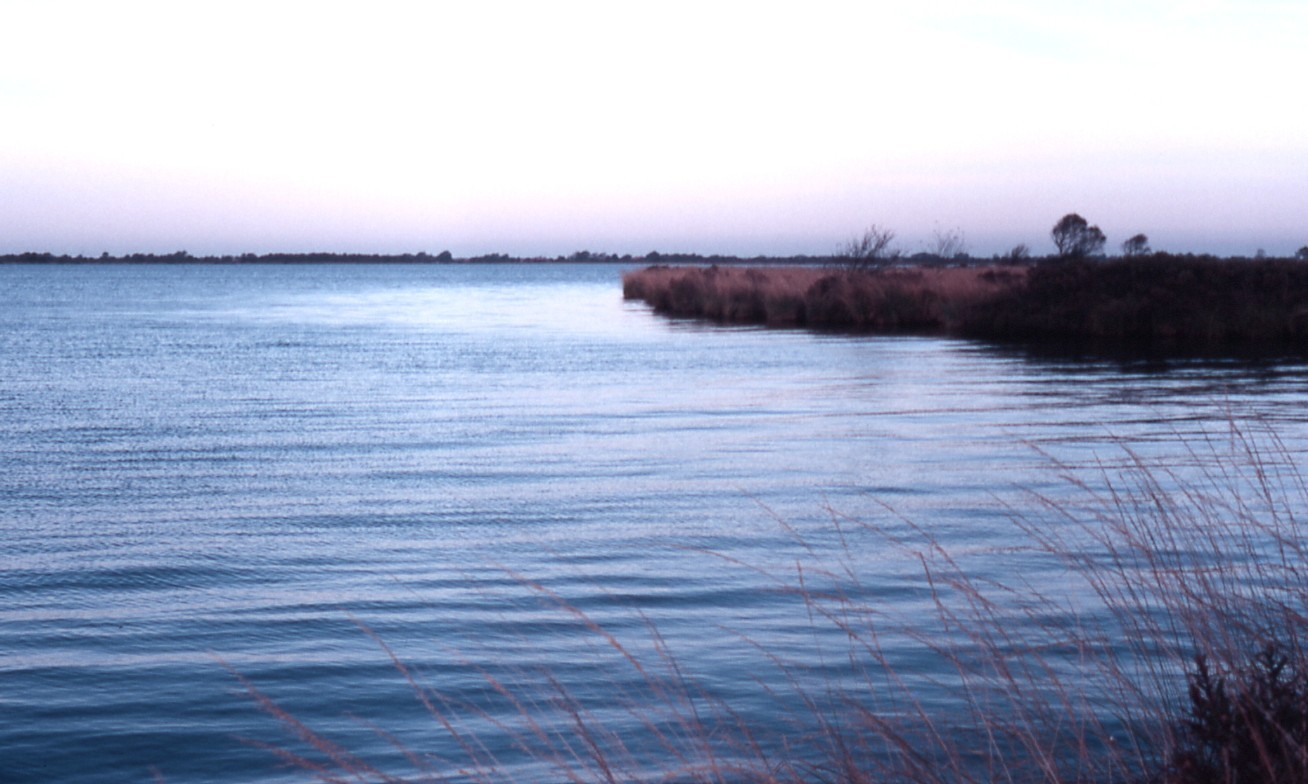
- The Ewiges Meer, Oct 1987

- Location within Germany
- Location: East Frisia, Lower Saxony
- Coordinates: 53°32′44″N 7°25′54″E
- Max. length: 1.650 km (1.025 mi)
- Max. width: 0.870 km (0.541 mi)
- Surface area: 91 ha (220 acres)
- Average depth: 2 m (6 ft 7 in)
- Max. depth: 3 m (9.8 ft)
- Water volume: ca. 2,000,000 m^{3} (1,600 acre⋅ft)
- Surface elevation: 8.5 m (28 ft)

The Ewiges Meer is the largest raised bog lake in Germany, with an area of 91 hectares (0.91 km^{2}). Its surface lies at about 8.5 metres above sea level (NN). The lake is surrounded by an extensive complex of unutilised areas, that exhibit the actual raised bog profile and, together with the lake, form the Ewiges Meer Nature Reserve (Ewiges Meer und Umgebung) which covers an area of 1,290 hectares.

== Location ==
The nature reserve lies on the border of the counties of Wittmund and Aurich near the village of Eversmeer in East Frisia. It belongs to the Nenndorf Raised Bog (Nenndorfer Hochmoor) on the shoulder of the Oldenburg-East Frisian Geest Ridge and forms the core zone of the roughly 33-square kilometre Großes Moor bog complex near Aurich.

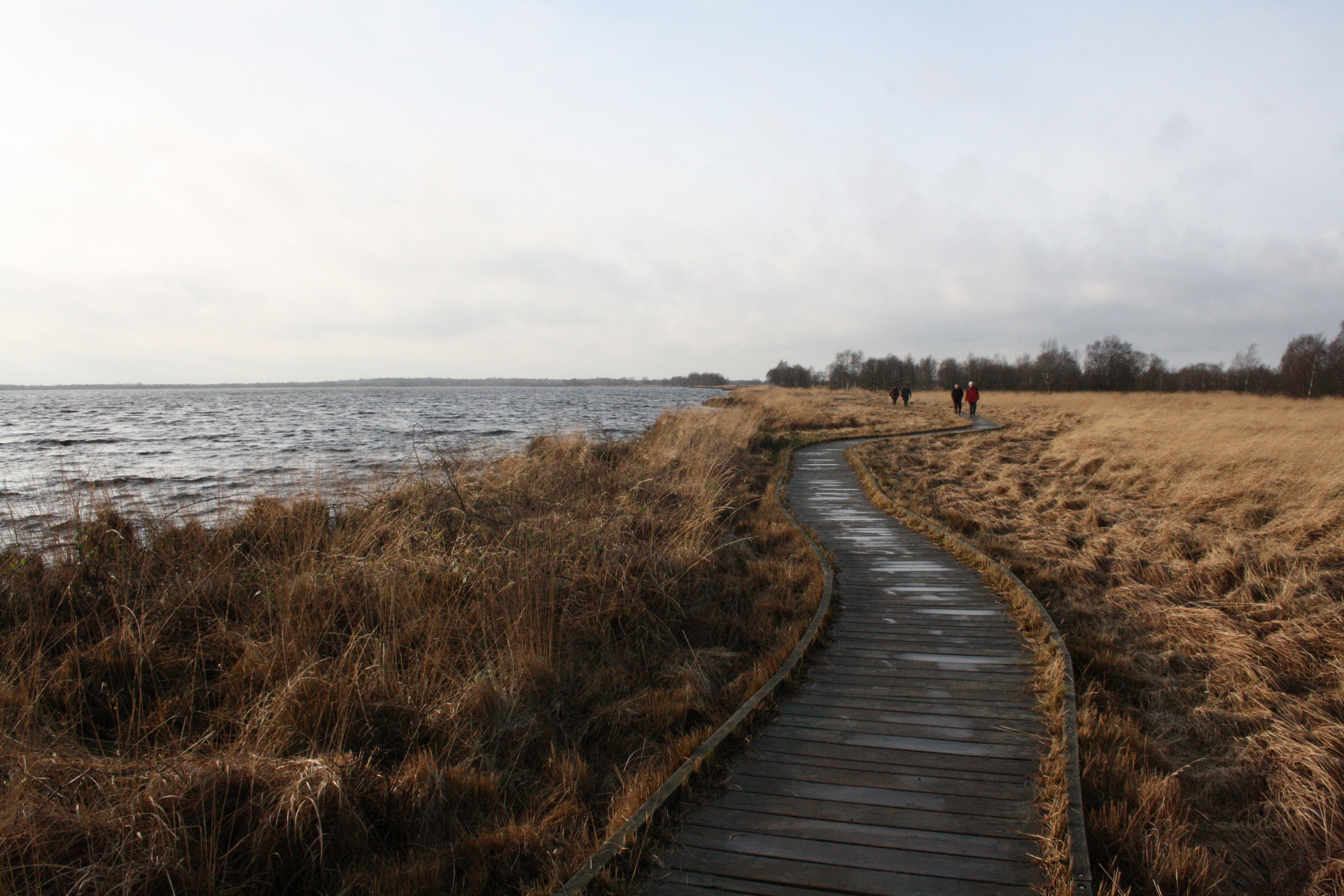
Shoreline of the Ewiges Meer

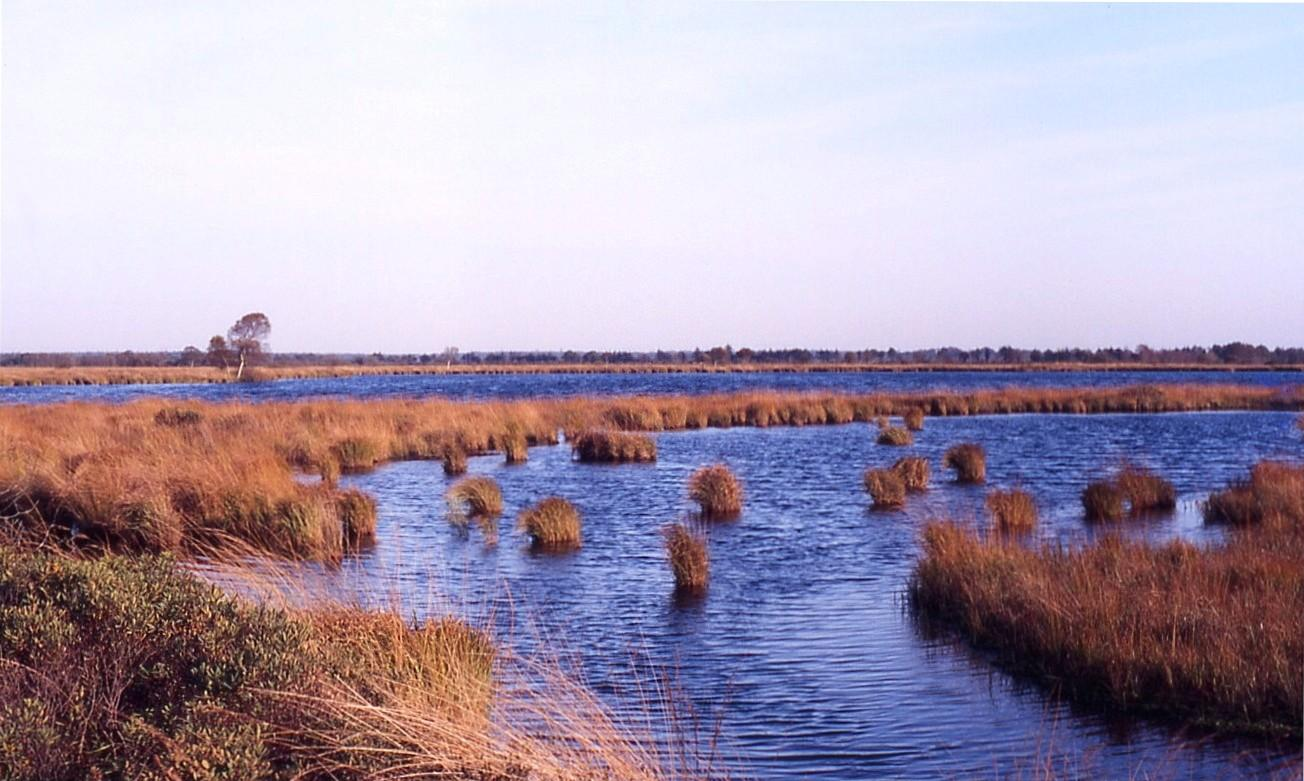
The Dobbe, a nearby bog eye

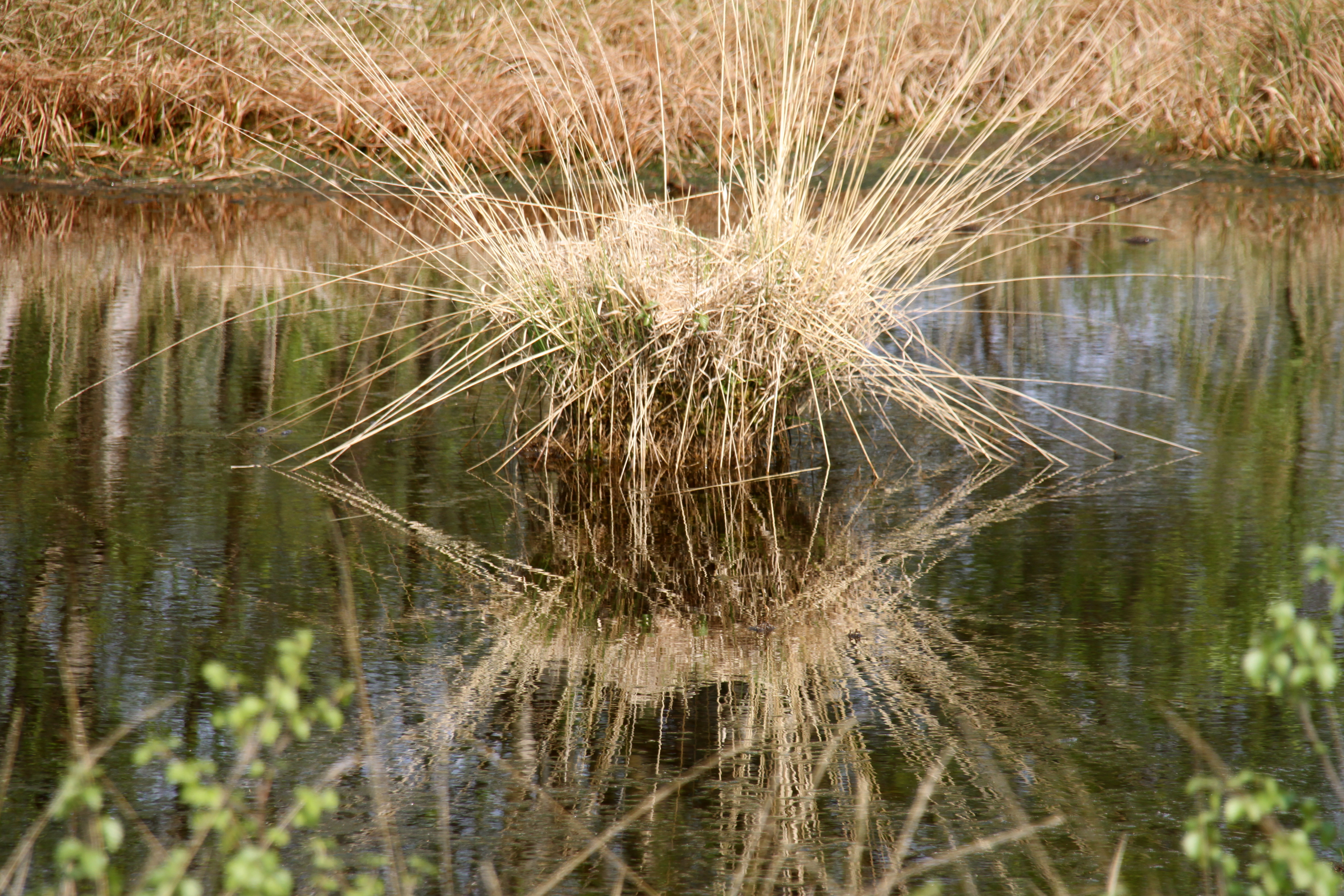
Purple moor-grass tussock

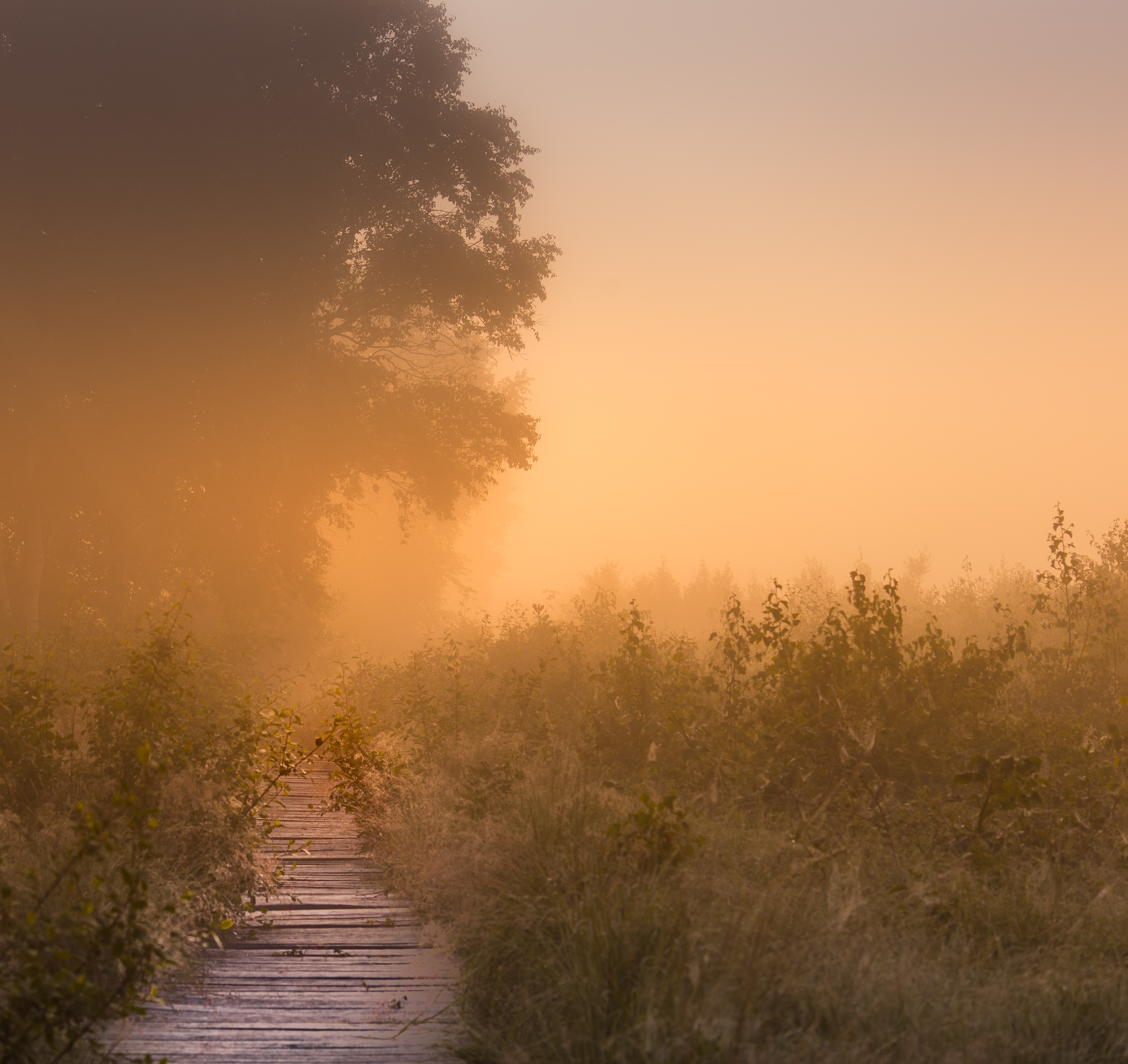
Ground fog at Ewiges Meer

== See also ==
- Lakes of Germany

== Literature ==
- Harm Poppen: Naturschutzgebiet Ewiges Meer. Verlag Cl. Mettcker & Söhne, Esens, 1991, ISBN 3-87542-009-8.
- Ernst Andreas Friedrich: Naturdenkmale Niedersachsens. Landbuch-Verlag, Hanover, 1980, ISBN 3-7842-0227-6.
