= Red Moor (Rhön) =

Bog in Germany

Coordinates: 50°28′0″N 9°58′50″E

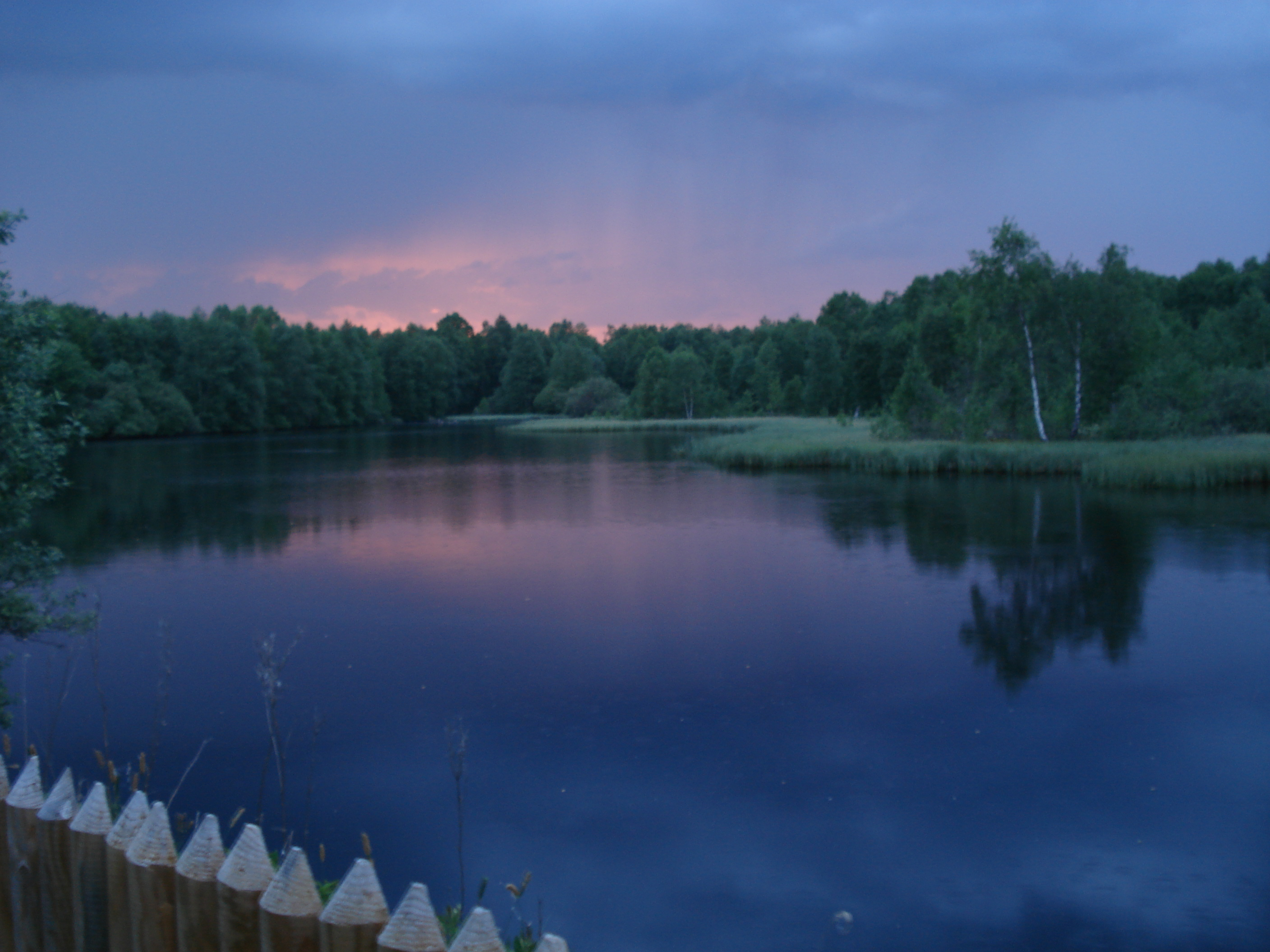
The Moorweiher, a reservoir in the Red Moor in the Rhön Mountains

The Red Moor (German: Rotes Moor) is a raised bog in the Hessian part of the Rhön Mountains in Germany. It lies within the eponymous nature reserve in the Rhön Biosphere Reserve and is part of the Europe-wide conservation system, Natura 2000. The Red Moor has an area of 50 hectares and is the second largest raised bog in the High Rhön after the Black Moor (66.4 hectares). For 175 years, until 1984, peat was cut here. The interior of the raised bog is severely damaged, especially as a result of the many years of peat cutting. Its perimeters are however still largely undisturbed areas that are better and more typically developed than the Black Moor, 8 kilometres away. In 1979 large-scale renaturalisation measures began.

== Geography ==
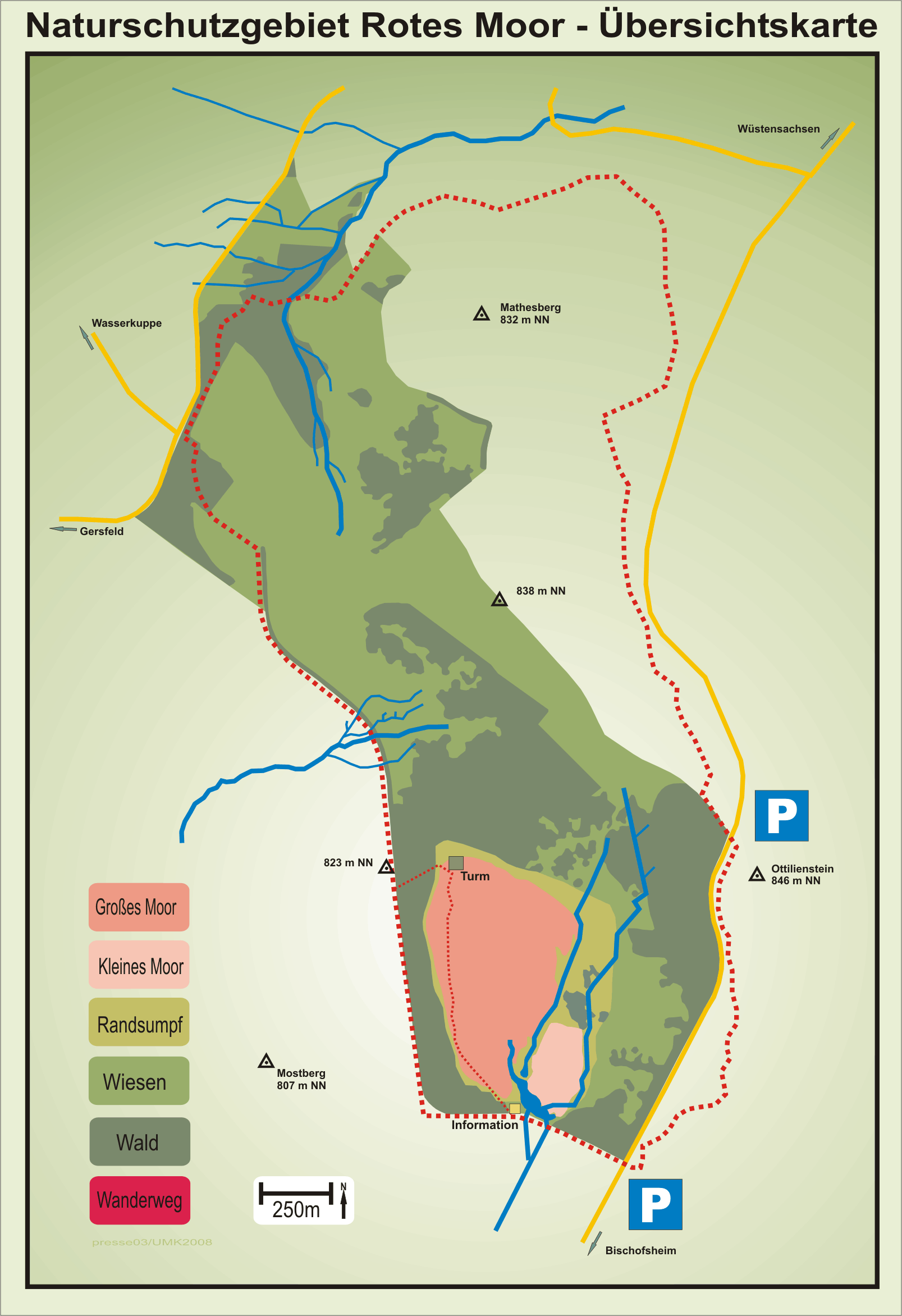
Overview map of the Red Moor Nature Reserve

The Red Moor is the largest raised bog in Hesse, followed by the moor in the Breungeshain Heath (4 ha) on the uplands of the Vogelsberg. In the Rhön it is the second largest bog after the Black Moor; others being the Great Moor (Großes Moor, 8 ha) and Little Moor (Kleines Moor, 2 ha) on the Stirnberg, and the Moorlein on the Rasenberg. As a result of centuries of peat extraction, which lasted until the 1980s, only an area of about five hectares is left as a core zone. The Red Moor is divided into two areas: The Great Red Moor (Großes Rotes Moor, formerly 32 hectares of raised bog – today just under 11 ha) and the Little Red Moor (Kleines Rotes Moor, formerly 7 hectares of raised bog – today 1.7 ha). It lies about five kilometres southeast of the Wasserkuppe on the B 278 federal highway between the village of Ehrenberg (part of Wüstensachsen) on the Hessian side and the town of Bischofsheim an der Rhön on the Bavarian side of the state border.

The bog measures about a kilometre from north to south and 600 metres from west to east. Its lowest point at the southern end of the moor is about 804 metres above sea level and it climbs towards the north to about 830 metres ASL. The moor is bounded by the surrounding mountains which, running clockwise, are the Mathesberg (831.8 m) to the north, the Ottilienstein (846.4 m) to the northeast, the Heidelstein (925.7 m) to the east, the Kesselstein (799.2 m) to the south, the Mostberg (807.4 m) to the west and the Feldberg (815.2 m) to the northwest.

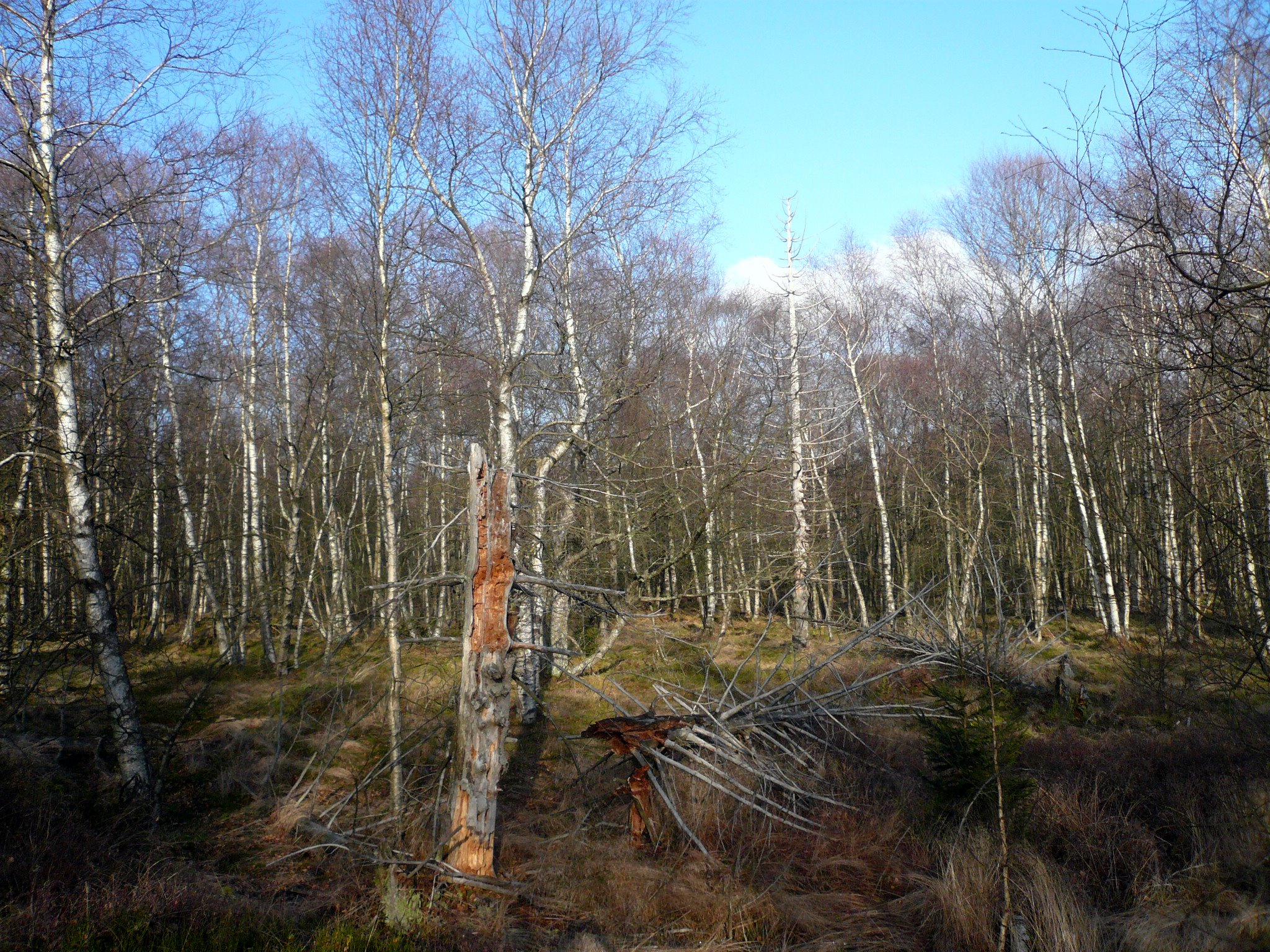
Birch woodland

The Red Moor lies in the southern part of the Red Moor Nature Reserve which covers an area of 314.7 hectares. This reserve, designated in 1979, the name of which is taken from the raised bog, lies mostly above the 800 metre contour, but elevations range from 720 to 835 metres above Normalnull. It is one of the oldest and largest nature reserves in Hesse and lies between the Wasserkuppe and the Heidelstein on the gently rolling saddle of the High Rhön. It measures 3.5 kilometres from north to south and 0.6 to 1.2 kilometres from east to west. There are other smaller wetlands with thinner layers of peat in the nature reserve formed around three hollows, each the source of a stream. The stream draining the lowest point of the moor is the Moorwasser ("bog water"). It flows south into the Schwarzbach, which discharges into the Brend at Bischofsheim its waters making their way via the Franconian Saale to the drainage basin of the Rhine. Within the moor itself, the Moorwasser separates the Little Red Moor to the southeast from the Great Red Moor to the northwest. Above the tailstream of the artificial embankment built in 1973 is a small reservoir. Another source stream, the Feldbach, flows westwards into the Fulda. A third stream, the Grumbach, flows northwards into the Ulster, a tributary of the Werra. The Werra and Fulda later converged to form the Weser. The reserve thus lies on the watershed between the Rhine and the Weser.

== Tourism ==
The Red Moor ist well developed for tourists and is a popular destination in the Rhön. It is open to the public and wheelchair friendly. Guided walks through the moor are conducted several times a week. About 500 metres east of the information pavilion of the Red Moor, on the road from Wüstensachsen to Bischofsheim an der Rhön, there is a large car park and the Haus am Roten Moor (House by the Red Moor), built in 2003–04, with toilets, a kiosk and information boards. The timber-framed house was opened on 3 September 2004 and has an area of about 150 square metres. The main entry to the Red Moor Cross Country Skiing Centre is also from this car park.

== Literature ==
- Stiftung Hessischer Naturschutz (publ.): Naturschutzgebiet Rotes Moor im Biosphärenreservat Rhön. 1997, ISBN 3-89051-172-4.
- Willy Kiefer: Die Moore der Rhön. Verlag Parzeller, Fulda, 1996, ISBN 3-7900-0269-0.
- Joachim S. Hohmann: Landvolk unterm Hakenkreuz. Agrar- und Rassenpolitik in der Rhön. Ein Beitrag zur Landesgeschichte Bayerns, Hessens und Thüringens. Frankfurt am Main etc., 1992, ISBN 3-631-45093-1.
- Max Mölter: Die Hochrhönstraße. 5th edition, Verlag Parzeller, Fulda, 1986, ISBN 3-7900-0149-X.
- Heribert Kramm: Die Hochrhön. Verlag Parzeller, Fulda, 2006, ISBN 3-7900-0305-0.
- U. Bohn: Die Vegetation der Hohen Rhön – Gesellschaftsinventar, Bewertung, aktuelle Gefährdungen, Erhaltungsmaßnahmen. Natur und Landschaft, Bonn-Bad Godesberg, 1981.
- G. Große-Brauckmann: Moore in der Rhön als Beispiele für Entstehung, Entwicklung und Ausbildungsformen von Mooren und ihre Probleme heute. In: Naturkunde Osthessen. Fulda, 1996.
- LIFE-Projekt Rhön der EU (publ.): Naturschätze der Rhön: Hochmoore. Kaltensundheim, 1997.
- Jürgen Holzhausen, Ernst Hettche: Hochmoore im Biosphärenreservat Rhön. Verlag Richard Mack, Mellrichstadt, 1996, ISBN 3-9802436-2-1.
- S. Reimann, G. Große Brauckmann, B. Streitz: Die Pflanzendecke des Roten Moores in der Rhön. In: Naturkunde Osthessen. Fulda, 1985.
