= Michael Succow =

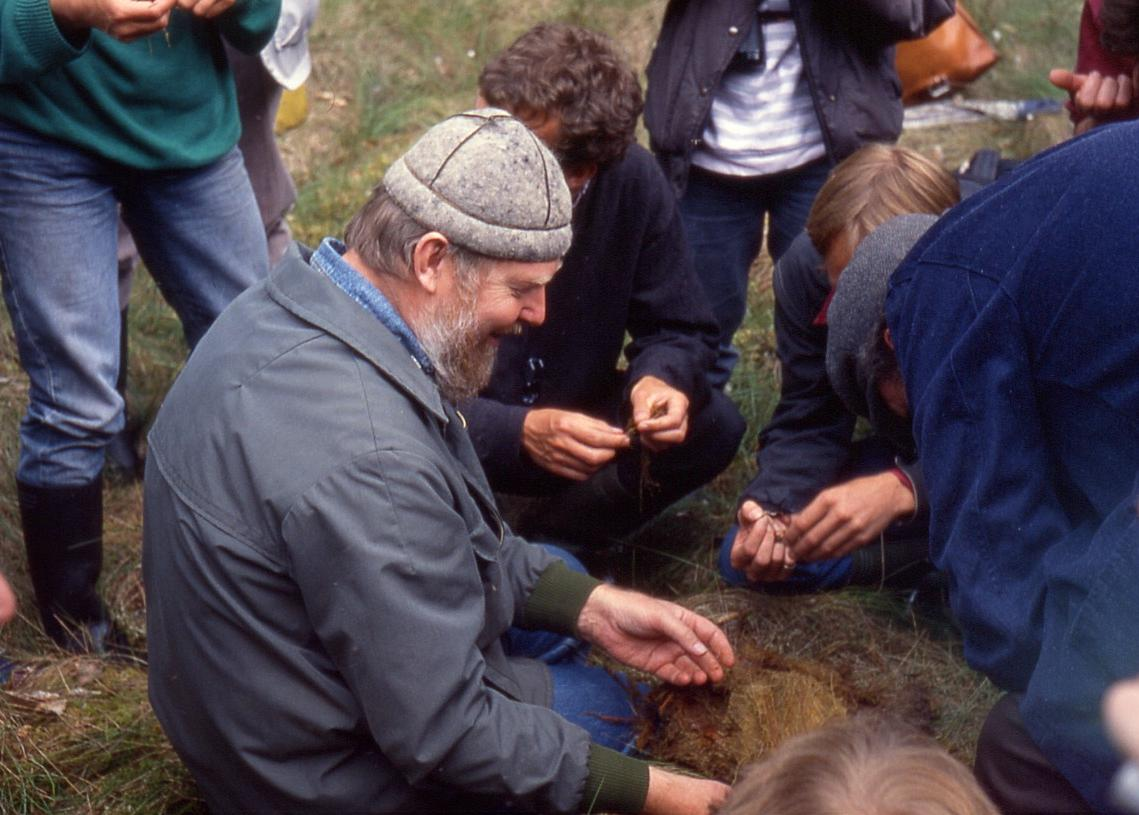
- Born: 21 April 1941 (age 85); Lüdersdorf, Province of Brandenburg, Prussia, Germany
- Education: University of Greifswald
- Awards: Right Livelihood Award (1997), German Environmental Award
- Scientific career
- Fields: biology, landscape ecology
- Workplaces: University of Greifswald; Academy of Agricultural Sciences (GDR)

Michael Succow (born 21 April 1941 in Lüdersdorf (now part of Wriezen)) is a German biologist and ecologist. His numerous publications are mostly devoted to the ecology of moorlands and his typology of moorlands is today used as a standard classifications strategy for moorlands.

In 1997, he was awarded the Right Livelihood Award for his work, particularly his efforts to create nature reserves in Germany, Eastern Europe and Asia. In 2015, Succow was awarded the honorary German Environmental Prize of the German Federal Environmental Foundation, Europe's highest endowed environmental prize.

== Life ==
Succow studied biology at the University of Greifswald from 1960 until 1965. He stayed at the University of Greifswald for another four years as scientific assistant. When he openly sympathised with reform forces during the Prague Spring in 1969, GDR officials pressed for him to leave the university. Succow then worked outside the university, but nevertheless finished his PhD thesis on moor vegetation in 1970. He then worked in Mongolia for several months before becoming a scientific employee at the Department of Agrology at the Academy of Agricultural Sciences of the German Democratic Republic, a position that allowed him to write his habilitation, which in turn helped him become a professor at the academy in 1987.

For a short period in 1990, Succow was the vice secretary of nature, conservation and water of the GDR. On 12 September 1990 Succow successfully pressed the Council of Secretaries of the GDR on their last meeting before the German reunification to declare about 7% of the soon-to-be dissolved nation as national parks and biosphere reserves.

After the German reunification, Succow accepted a visiting professorship at Technische Universität Berlin. He then worked as a consultant for the state of Brandenburg as well as on an international level, for instance initiating seven National Parks in the country of Georgia. He was hired as a full university professor for geobotany and landscape ecology and director of the Department of Botany and the botanical garden of the University of Greifswald in 1992.

After 1990, Succow did consulting work in a number of former Warsaw Pact countries as well as in Central Asia and East Asia resulting in the designation of nature reservations (including a number of UNESCO world nature heritage sites) in Kamchatka, the Lena river delta, Karelia, Kyrgyzstan, Kazakhstan, Uzbekistan, Mongolia, Georgia, Russia and Belarus.

With the prize money of the Right Livelihood Award, he founded the Michael Succow Foundation for the Protection of Nature (German: Michael-Succow-Stiftung zum Schutz der Natur), which, for instance, helped Azerbaijan to create a national park programme with up to eight reserves.

Michael Succow is a scientific counsellor to a number of environmental organisations and institutions.

== Honours (selection) ==
- 1997 Right Livelihood Award in Stockholm
- 2000 URANIA-Medaille für besondere Leistungen in der wissenschaftlichen Volksbildung
- 2001 Commander's Cross of the Order of Merit of the Federal Republic of Germany
- 2005 Order of Merit of the State of Brandenburg
- 2006 Rubenow Medal of the City of Greifswald
- 2015 Honorary German Environmental Prize by the German Federal Environmental Foundation
