= Flark =

Landform in a bog

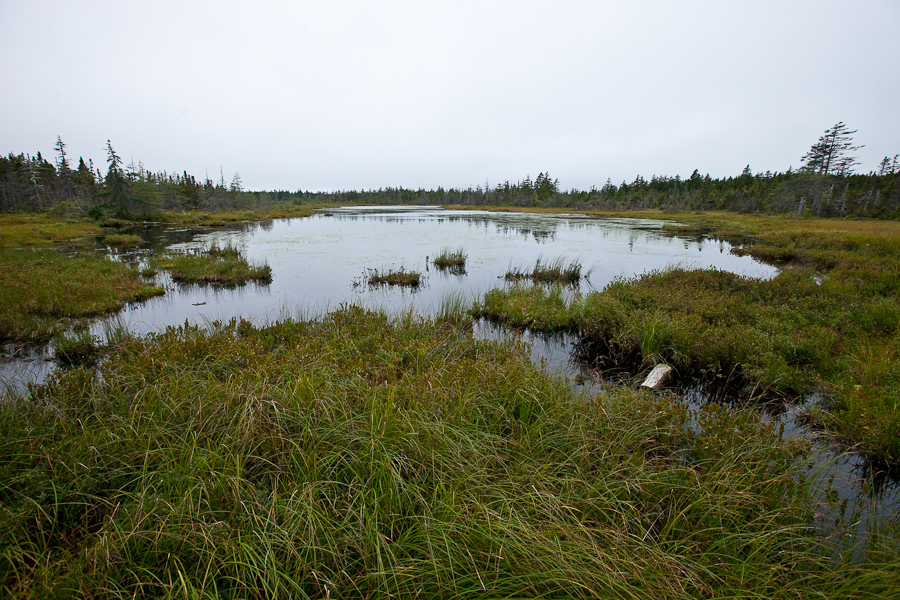
A water-filled flark in a bog in Fundy National Park, New Brunswick

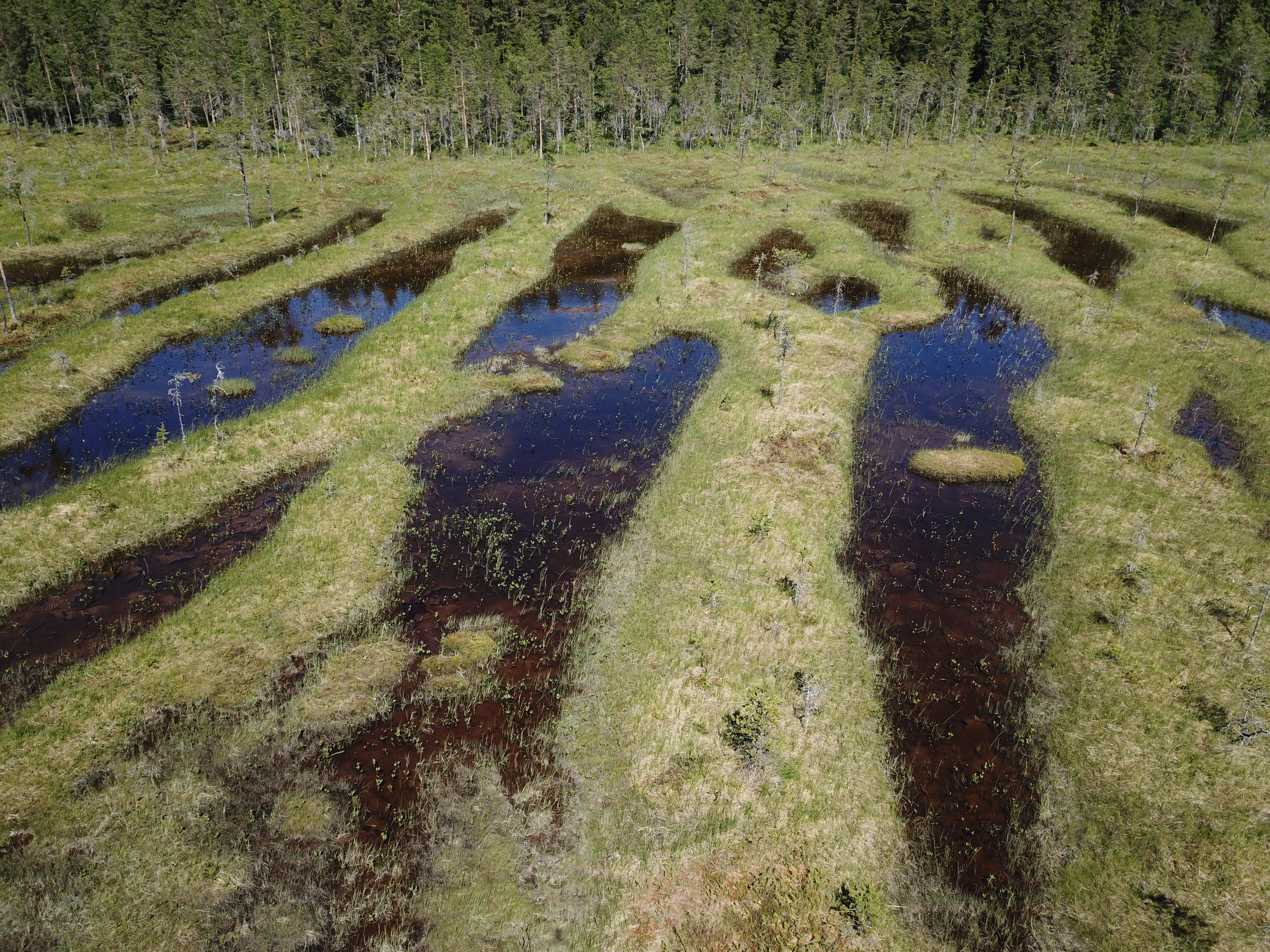
Flark and strings in a bog of Sweden.

A flark is a depression or hollow within a bog. Flarks typically occur as a series of parallel depressions, separated by intervening ridges known as strings.

Early theories suggested that flarks were formed by frost heaving, but flarks have since been found in areas where frost heaving does not occur. Flarks are now thought to form when the peat that forms the base of the bog becomes so thick that it slides downslope due to its own weight. Irregularities in the underlying terrain halt the slide of the peat, causing flarks to form downslope from the obstruction as the downslope peat tears away from the portion of the peat mass held back by the underlying obstruction. Another theory suggests that flarks are formed by areas within the bog which experience accelerated rates of decay, causing depressions in the bog.

== See also ==
- String bog
