= Nordhorn =

- Town
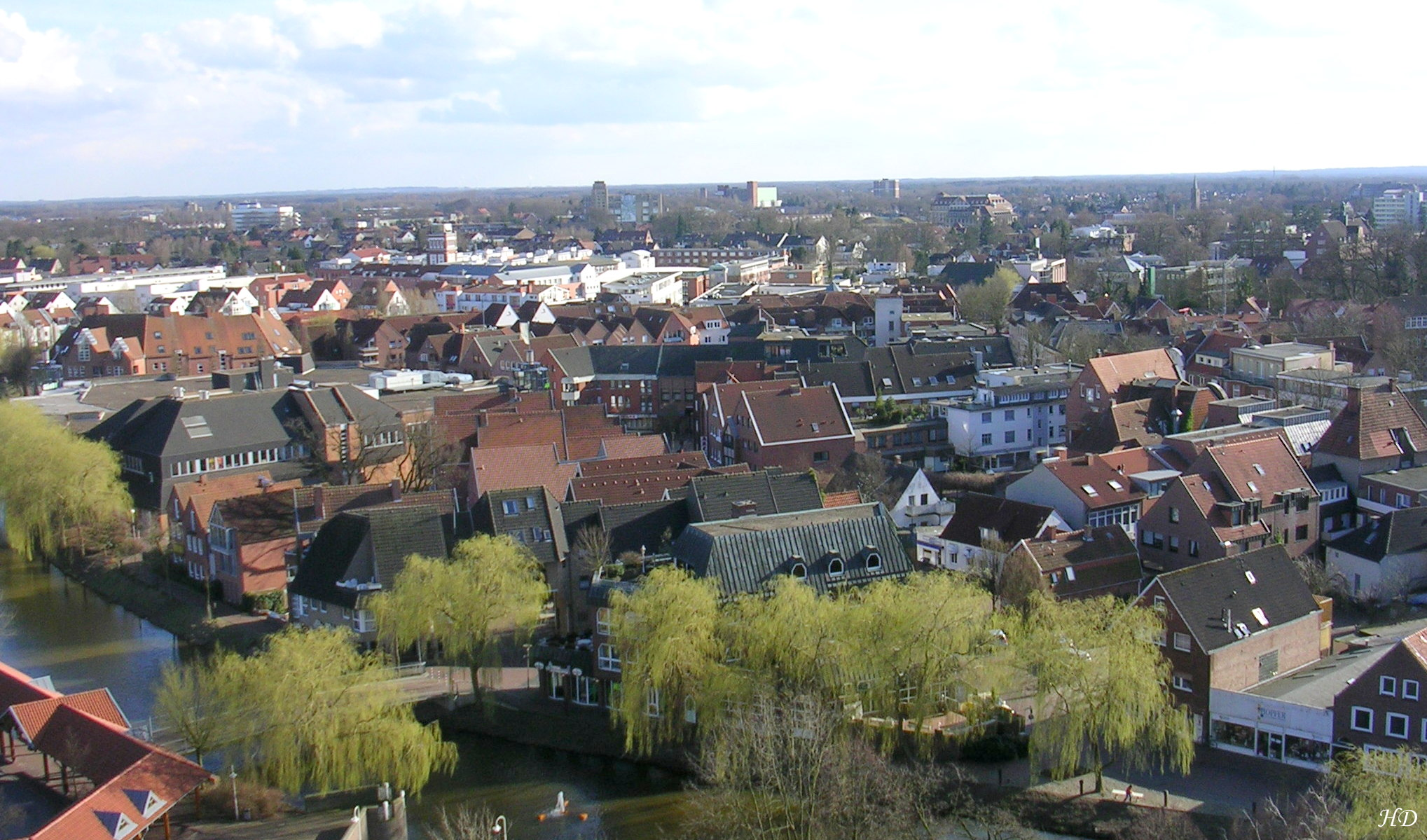
- Panoramic view of Nordhorn

- Flag Coat of arms

- Location of Nordhorn within Grafschaft Bentheim district
- Interactive map of Nordhorn
- Location within Germany Location within Lower Saxony
- Coordinates: 52°25′55″N 7°04′04″E
- Country: Germany
- State: Lower Saxony
- District: Grafschaft Bentheim

Government
  - Mayor (2026-): Christoph Meier (Bürgerform Nordhorn (B!FN))

Area
  - Total: 149.87 km^{2} (57.87 sq mi)
- Elevation: 23 m (75 ft)

Population (2025-12-31)
  - Total: 57,372
  - Density: 382.81/km^{2} (991.48/sq mi)
- Time zone: UTC+01:00 (CET)
  - Summer (DST): UTC+02:00 (CEST)
- Postal codes: 48527–48531
- Dialling codes: 05921
- Vehicle registration: NOH
- Website: www.nordhorn.de

Nordhorn (German pronunciation: [ˈnɔʁtˌhɔʁn]; Northern Low Saxon: Nothoorn, or Notthoarn, Netthoarn, and Dutch: Noordhoorn), is a town in Lower Saxony, Germany. It is the district seat of Grafschaft Bentheim, in the southwest corner of the state, near the border of the Netherlands and North Rhine-Westphalia.

== Etymology ==
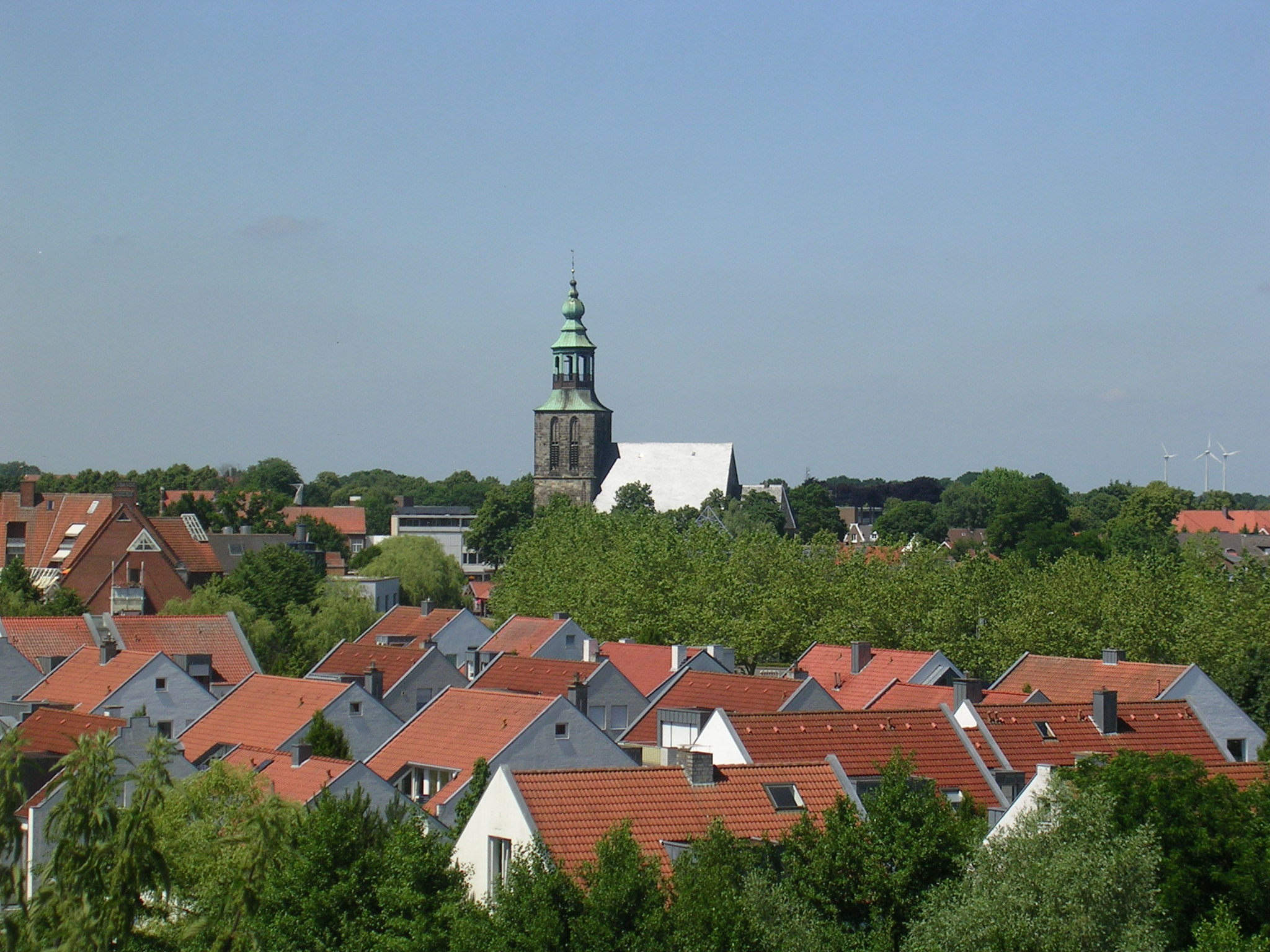
View of the Povelberg

There are several theories about the origin of Nordhorn's name. One possibility is that the name originates from a horn (referred to as the Nothorn, or emergency horn) used by watchmen to warn the inhabitants of Vechteinsel (Vechte Island) if there was an attack. Additionally, the town's location north of Bentheim (now Bad Bentheim) and its castle may have contributed to this name.

Another theory suggests that boatmen on the river Vechte used horns to communicate during foggy conditions. A bronze memorial, the Tuter ("Tooter"), commemorating the origins of inland shipping, was placed in the harbour in the 1970s.

A third theory is that Nordhorn originates from a settlement with a harbour between Schüttorf and Emlichheim in the Early Middle Ages, whose coat of arms featured a horn as a charge.

A more scientific interpretation links the name 'horn' to the concept of a 'pointed end,' referring to a northern landform in the Vechte Valley where the town developed. This theory was mentioned in Heinrich Specht's town chronicle, published in 1941.

One theory suggests that the name is linked to the worship of a god named Nod (Node) or Nothe, with horns used in religious ceremonies. However, this theory is less widely accepted, as it lacks strong historical and scientific evidence to support its claims.

Historical records indicate that the town has been referred to by various names over time, including Norhthornon in 890, Northornon in 1050, and Northorne in 1184. It was not until 1827 that the town became known as Nordhorn (also Nothoorn or Notthöörntin).

== Geography ==
=== Location ===
The town lies in southwestern Lower Saxony, near the Netherlands border and the boundary with North Rhine-Westphalia, on the river Vechte. The nearest major city is Hengelo in the Netherlands, some 20 kilometres (12 miles) southwest of Nordhorn. The nearest German cities are Münster, about 75 km (47 mi) to the southeast, and Osnabrück, about 85 km (53 mi) to the east.

The landscape in and around Nordhorn is marked by the Vechte, the Vechtesee (English: Vechte Lake), through which the Vechte flows, and three canals: the Süd-Nord-Kanal, the Nordhorn-Almelo-Kanal and the Ems-Vechte-Kanal.

=== Climate ===
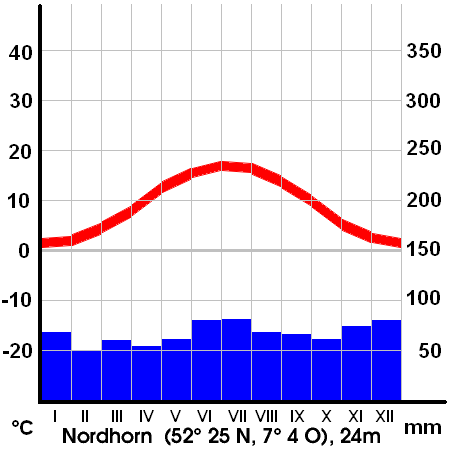
Climate diagram for Nordhorn

Nordhorn is located in the Central European Temperate Zone. The average annual temperature is 8.5 °C (47 °F), the mean air pressure is 30 in Hg (1016 mbar). The average yearly precipitation ranges between 700 and 800 mm (28 and 31 in). The climate is sub-Atlantic with mild winters and fairly warm summers.

=== Extent of the municipal area ===
As a result of several amalgamations, the town now covers 14,959 hectares, making it only marginally smaller than the Principality of Liechtenstein.

=== Neighbouring communities ===
North of Nordhorn lies the town and joint community (Samtgemeinde) both called Neuenhaus, while the communities of Engden and Isterberg lie to the south. The town's western limit is also part of Germany's border with the Netherlands.

=== Constituent communities ===
As of today, Nordhorn is divided into seven local subdistricts (Gemarkungen) an further quarters ("Stadtteile").

=== Local Subdistricts ===
Bimolten Known as Bimolte in 1213 and Bimolt in 1252. The origin of the name is disputed: Specht suggests it refers to heaps of earth; Reurik proposes it denotes a grove near the woods (bi'm holte, modern German beim Holz); Abels believes it means a settlement on a field.

Bookholt The name is thought to refer to a grove of either beeches (Buche) or birches (Birke).

Brandlecht First recorded as Bramtelghet in 1313. The name likely derives from Bram (gorse) and telge (twig).

Hesepe The name possibly refers to the location on the Vechte river, with epe interpreted as an old word for water.

Hestrup Documented as Hersebruc (1150) and Hersedorp (1212), meaning "Steed Village". The suffix –dorf or –trup is a cognate of the English thorpe, indicating an early farming settlement, likely established around 800 CE with the spread of Christianity.

Hohenkörben Established around 600 CE and originally known as Hankorve. Located on a narrow dune ridge at Bakelde's market, its name's origin remains unclear. A similarly named area exists in nearby Neuenhaus (Hohenkörben-Veldhausen).

Klausheide The local subdistrict is named in 1914 after Claus, the son of the founder of the Klausheide Estate (Krupp von Bohlen und Halbach). Heide means "heath").

Nordhorn This local subdistrict is existing since 1929 after integration of the former communities Frensdorf, Frenswegen, Altendorf, Bakelde an parts of Bookholt and was also the town until 1974.

=== Further quarters ===
Altendorf The original centre of Nordhorn was located in Altendorf, but it was later moved for strategic reasons to the island in the river Vechte. In 1379, Nordhorn was granted town rights, and the older settlement came to be known as Oude Dorp ("Old Village").

Bakelde The name is derived from Bak (ridge) and Lo (grove), possibly related to Bach and Alte.

Blanke The Blanke (German: Die Blanke) was once a sunken heath and bog area, raised at the edges, with pools of water that "glinted in the sunlight". The two largest were the Große Blanke and the Kleine Blanke. Over time, the area dried out, and by the onset of the Second World War, buildings had been constructed along the raised edges (e.g., Dorotheenstraße and Klarastraße). After the war, more extensive settlement occurred, particularly by refugees and textile workers. The new district was named Blanke in reference to the former heath ponds. Several nearby streets reflect this origin, including Blankering and Innere Blanke.

Blumensiedlung In the 1920s, housing was developed for unemployed miners from the Ruhr region who were recruited to work in the textile industry, as well as for young families from Nordhorn. The district was named Blumensiedlung ("Flower Settlement") due to its streets being named after various flowers.

Bussmaate Originally meadowland, the Buss Maate area was owned by a farmer named Busch from Altendorf (Buss deriving from his name). In 1910, the textile manufacturer Rawe acquired the land and established spinning mills there. Workers' housing followed in 1913.

Neuberlin In the early 20th century, a housing cooperative was established southeast of Denekamper Straße near Frensdorf on the initiative of a Mr. Mäulen. In recognition of his efforts, the district was named Neuberlin ("New Berlin") after his birthplace.

Stadtflur In earlier centuries, Nordhorn citizens held peat-cutting rights in this area, then moorland belonging to the community of Bakelde. Following a division of land in 1864, this section was allocated to Nordhorn and became known as the Stadtsche Flur ("municipal land"). By the turn of the 20th century, buildings appeared in the area, which became known as Stadtflur. Today, Stadtflur has approximately 7,700 inhabitants, making it one of Nordhorn's larger quarters (Stadtteile).

Streng While the modern German word streng means "stern" or "strict", the name actually derives from Strang ("string" or "strand"), referring to a row of dunes stretching from Bogenstraße to Nyhoegen Bridge on Bentheimer Straße. In the early 19th century, the textile industrialist Ludwig Povel built workers' housing along the nearer part of the Strang (around Bogenstraße and Ludwigstraße). In the 1930s and thereafter, private homes were added in the farther section.

=== Amalgamations ===
Integration of surrounding communities into Nordhorn
Date	Communities integrated
25 June 1921	Frensdorf
1 April 1929	Frenswegen
1 July 1929	parts of Altendorf, Bakelde, Bookholt, Hesepe, Brandlecht
1 March 1974	Bimolten, Bookholt, Brandlecht, Hesepe, Hestrup, Hohenkörben, Klausheide

== History ==
Human settlement in the Nordhorn area dates back more than 6,000 years, as evidenced by archaeological findings from the Neolithic Period and the subsequent Bronze Age.

During the Ice Age, early peoples settled on the elevated, dry riverbanks of the Vechte. Traces of Iron Age settlements have been discovered across the region, forming the basis for later farming communities such as Frensdorf, Bookholt, Altendorf, Hesepe, and Bakelde.

From 12 BCE to 10 CE, Roman commanders including Drusus, Tiberius, Germanicus, and Varus led campaigns into what is now northern Germany. Operating from camps in Xanten, they are believed to have advanced into the lands of the Chamavi and Tubanti, who inhabited the Nordhorn region. The Romans likely used ancient riverbanks and sandy moorland paths as military roads—routes that would later evolve into significant trade roads linking cities such as Brussels, Amsterdam, Bremen, and Hamburg.

By the late 4th century, during the Migration Period, Saxons began pressing westward, displacing the Tubanti into present-day Twente. Following Charlemagne's conquest of the Saxons, a new internal border formed between the Frankish Empire and Saxony—an early version of today's German-Dutch border.

Christianization began in 687, when Bishop Wilfrid of York sent missionaries to the region. Willibrord established the Bishopric of Utrecht, and Werenfried spread Christianity throughout the Vechte Valley. Around 800, Nordhorn was assigned to the Bishopric of Münster, and Bishop Ludger is said to have built a wooden church in the river's floodplain. The earliest recorded mention of Nordhorn appears around 900 as Northhornon in the Heberegister of Werden Monastery.

In about 1180, the Counts of Bentheim took control of the Nordhorn Gogericht (regional court) and built a castle on an island in the Vechte. Though the castle was largely dismantled by 1912, its location is now occupied by the Catholic St.-Augustinus-Kirche. A dam and mills enabled control over the river's flow, and waterways—possibly built under Dutch influence—divided the island into six sections. The fortified settlement grew into a trading hub, with merchants and shipowners establishing themselves. The name Nordhorn was adopted for this newer, fortified area, while the earlier village around the market church became known as Altendorf (Old Village).

Nordhorn soon gained importance along the Flemish Road (today's Bundesstraße 213 and 403), linking it to wider European trade networks. The Vechte was navigable as far as Schüttorf, and goods flowed from Scandinavia and the Hanseatic League through Nordhorn to destinations as distant as Paris.

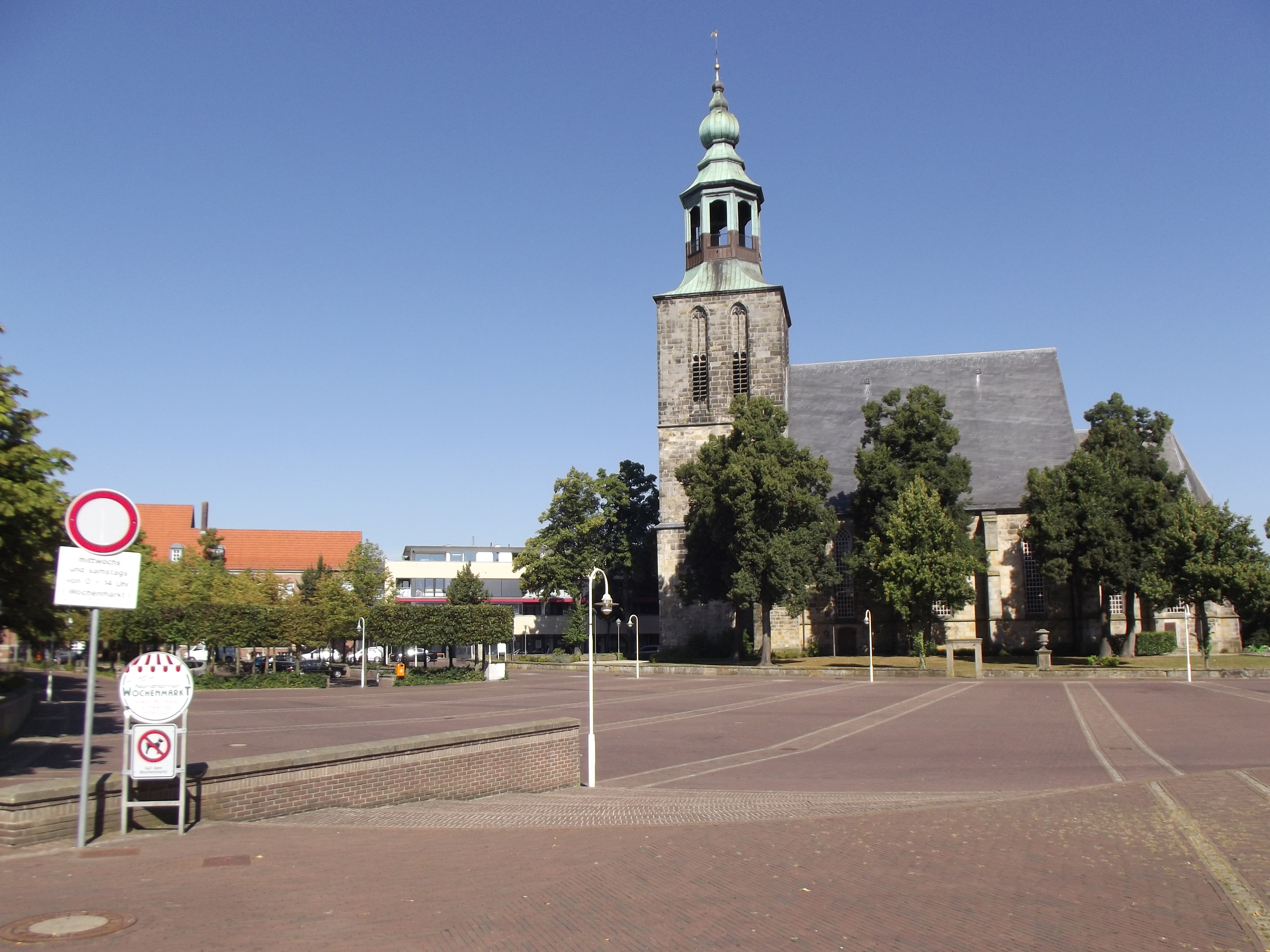
Market square Nordhorn

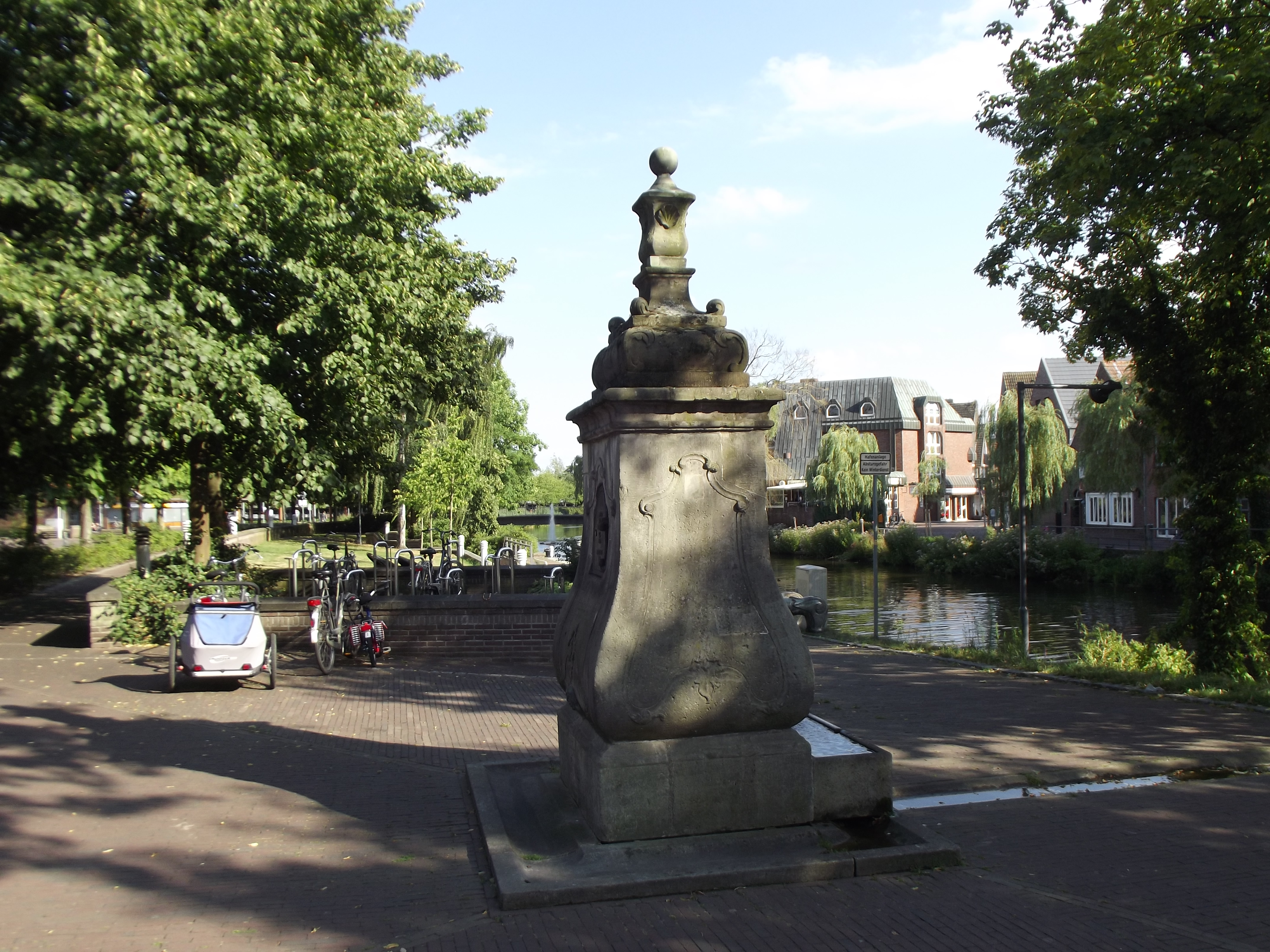
The still functioning ancient well in the centre

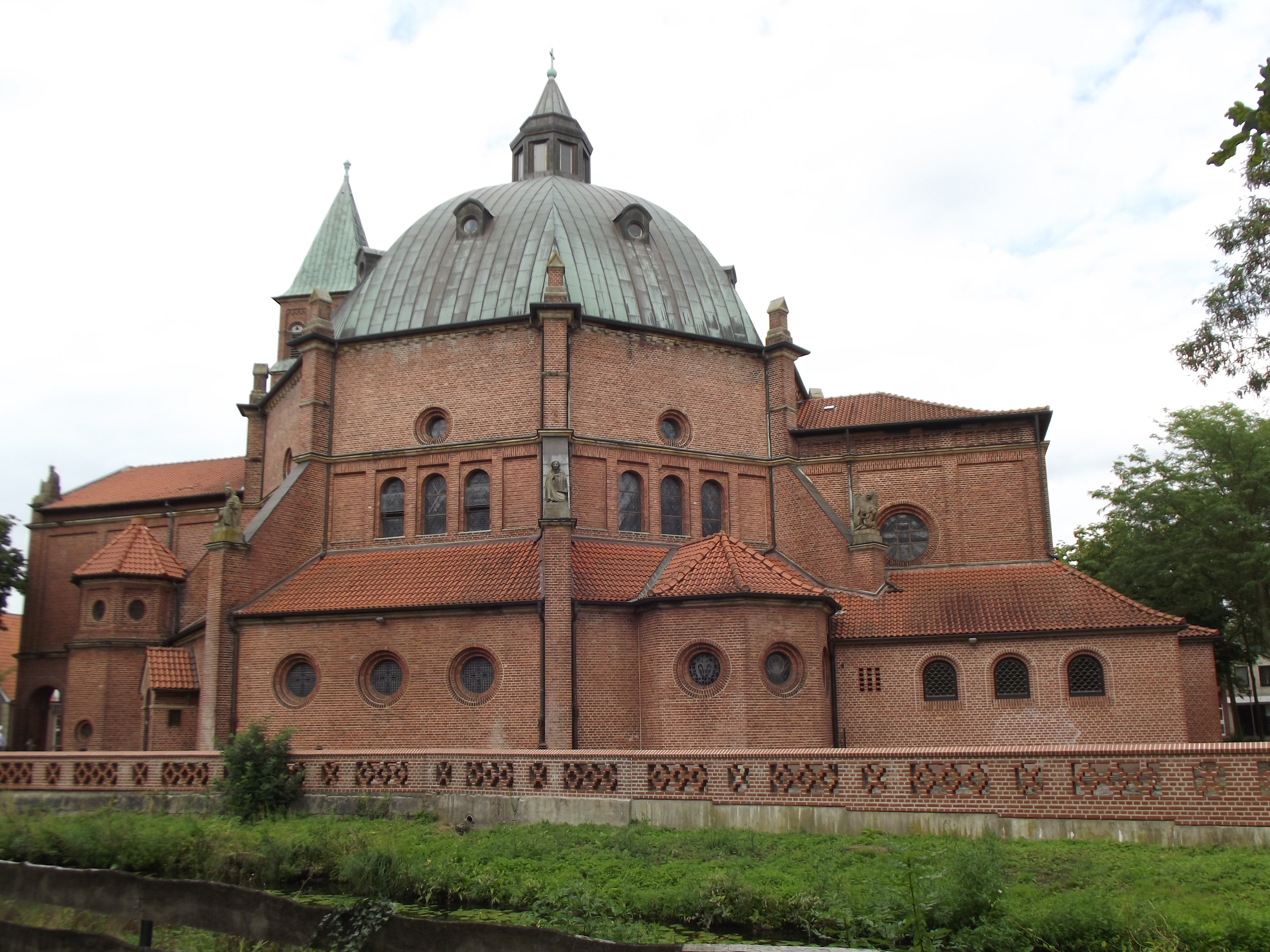
St. Augustinus Church viewed from the riverside

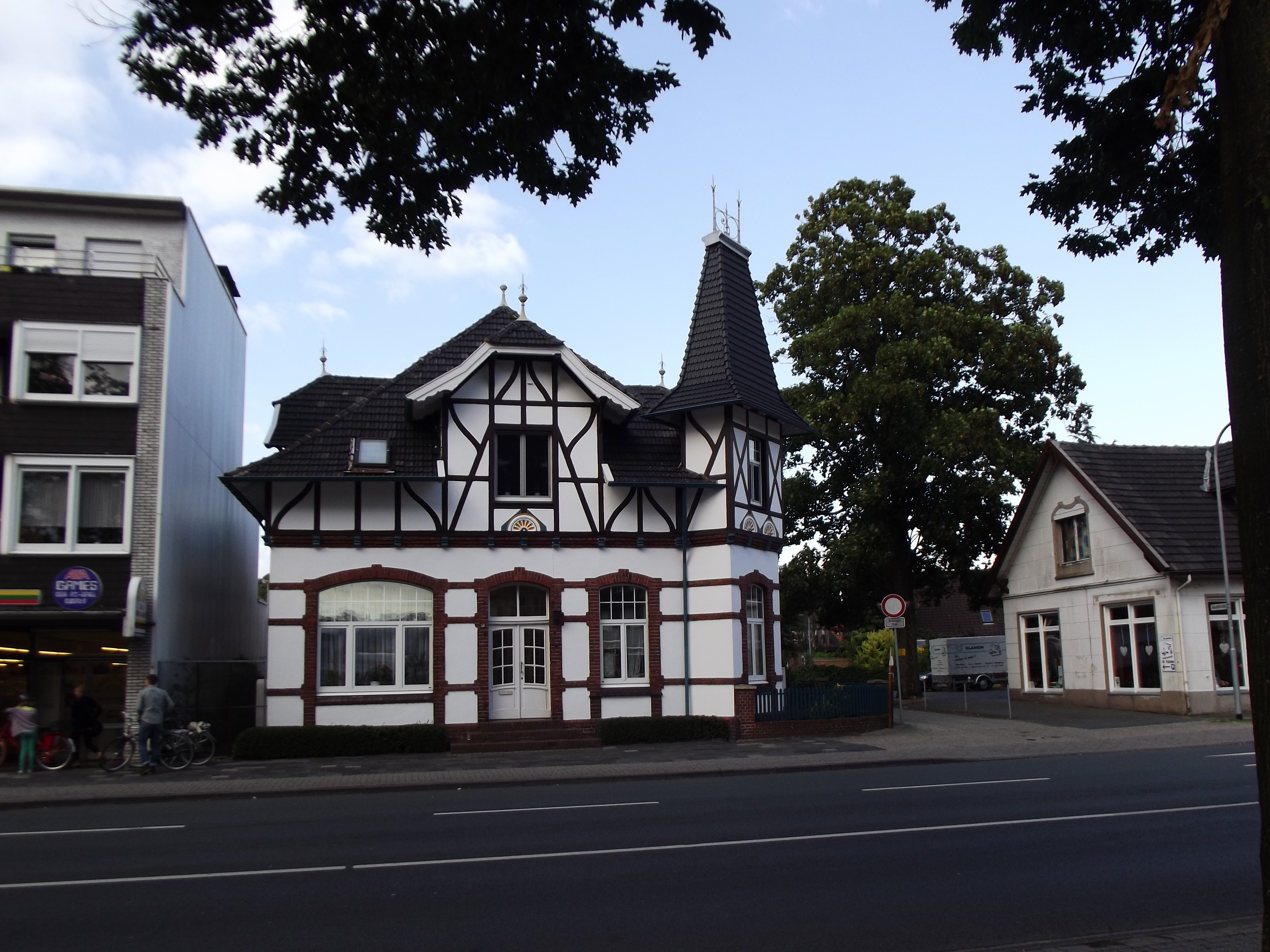
Timber framing house

In the Middle Ages, the Vechte—roughly 167 km (104 mi) long—flowed directly into the sea via the Zuider Zee, a key node in Dutch sea trade. Today, after land reclamation projects, it empties into the Zwarte Water north of Zwolle, eventually flowing into the IJsselmeer.

By 1160, Bentheim sandstone was being shipped from Nordhorn to the Netherlands. The Steinmaate market became a hub of stone trade, supplying materials for notable buildings such as the Royal Palace in Amsterdam, along with churches, locks, and mills. Returning ships brought spices, textiles, paper, coffee, tea, cacao, and tobacco. Until the mid-19th century, the local economy was based on trade, crafts, and agriculture.

On the ninth day after Whitsunday in 1379, Count Bernhard I granted Nordhorn town rights, followed by municipal privileges in 1416. The Augustinian canons established the Marienwolde Monastery in Frenswegen in 1394, which later gained renown as "Westphalia's Paradise." After secularization in 1806, monastic lands passed to the Bentheim Counts.

In the 13th century, churches built from Bentheim sandstone mirrored Romanesque styles from nearby Westphalia. The oldest preserved artifact from this period is a baptismal font in Brandlecht. The 15th-century Alte Kirche ("Old Church"), built in Late Gothic style, was dedicated to Saint Ludger. Its original 102-meter tower served as a firewatch and lookout, but was destroyed in a storm. The shorter replacement tower was designed to allow wind to pass through. During 20th-century restorations, wall paintings of the Twelve Apostles—the Nordhorner Apostelbilder—were uncovered and preserved with washi paper due to their religious and artistic significance.

War and epidemics marked the 17th and 18th centuries. During the Eighty Years' War, Spanish troops used Nordhorn as a waypoint. In the Thirty Years' War, various forces—Swedish, Hessian, Lüneburg, and Imperial—passed through the town. Shortly afterward, Bishop Christoph Bernhard von Galen waged war against the Dutch near Nordhorn, ending with the Peace of Nordhorn in 1666.

In Napoleonic times, Nordhorn became a center for smuggling due to the continental blockade. After the Congress of Vienna (1814–1815), the town's trade with the west declined due to new customs borders and the silting up of the Vechte. Many residents turned to small-scale farming or emigrated, while home weaving offered modest income.

In 1839, the textile era began when Willem Stroink from Enschede founded the first mechanized weaving mill. Subsequent mills followed in 1851 and 1864, revitalizing the economy. Mayor Ernst Firnhaber (1843–1872), a pharmacist and chemist, also established Germany's first quinine plant in Nordhorn, processing over 16 tons of cinchona in 1843.

Between 1872 and 1897, more textile firms were founded—some of which still operated into the 21st century. The 1890s saw the expansion of canal and rail networks. Canals such as the Ems-Vechte and Nordhorn-Almelo connected the town to Dutch waterways, while the Bentheim Railway (since 1896) linked it to the broader rail network. Around 1,500 workers were employed in the textile industry.

The economic boom attracted migrants during the Great Depression, and by 1939, Nordhorn's population had reached 23,457. The town's dynamic growth earned it the nickname Klein Amerika ("Little America").

During World War II, Nordhorn's small Jewish community was destroyed, and the synagogue on Synagogenstraße was razed. Resistance figures such as Adolf Pazdera and Ferdinand Kobitzki were murdered in concentration camps. German troops used Nordhorn's historic trade routes for military advancement into the Netherlands.

On 2 April 1945, Easter Monday, British troops of the XXXth Corps occupied Nordhorn, which had not been seriously defended.

Post-war, approximately 10,000 displaced people from eastern Germany resettled in Nordhorn, pushing the population beyond 40,000. A new district, "die Blanke", was built to accommodate 13,000 of them.

Private and public housing initiatives earned Nordhorn the nickname "the town of the privately owned home." The town also modernized its administration, constructing new municipal and district buildings. The post-war years saw the development of the region's first indoor swimming pool, new schools, sports halls, and cultural venues, transforming Nordhorn's urban landscape.

== Religion ==
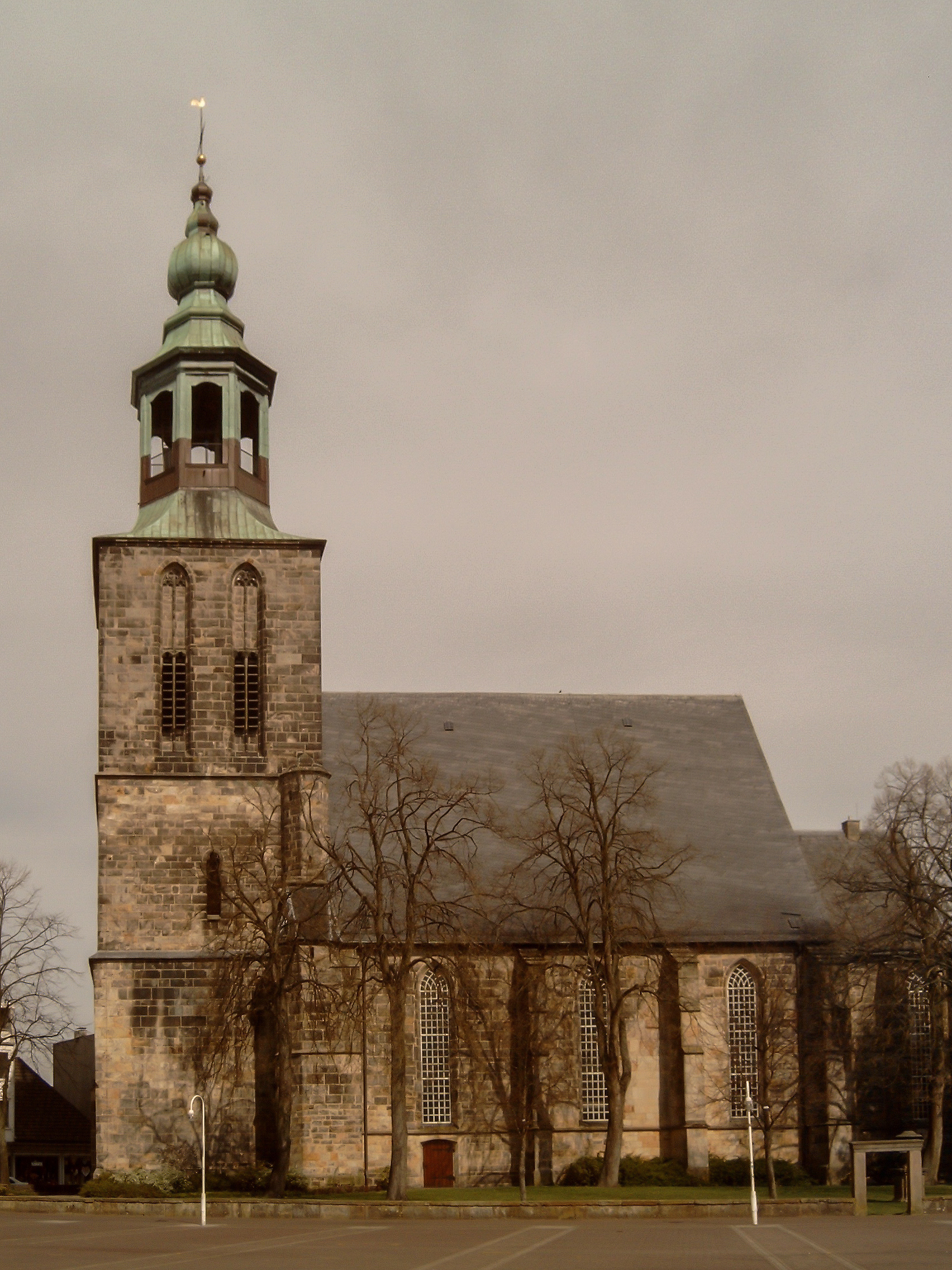
Nordhorn, church

When the first church was built in Nordhorn is unknown. The story goes, however, that it stood at the guild field and was named after Saint Ludger. Ludger was one of the first Christian missionaries in the area, and in 804 he became the first Bishop of Münster. He died in 809 near Billerbeck.

In the municipal area's northwest, a monastery of Augustinian Canons (Chorherrenstift) was founded in Frenswegen, earlier known as Marienwolde, in 1394. Its church, consecrated in 1444, was destroyed in 1881 by a lightning strike. The monastery was of great importance to Nordhorn and to places far beyond. The monastery was built bit by bit, and in the early 15th century, a church followed.

Also in Nordhorn, a larger church was needed. On 6 July 1445, both churches were consecrated by an auxiliary bishop from Münster. The new Nordhorn church's patron was once again Saint Ludger. The three-naved Late Gothic market church was built out of Bentheim sandstone and with its 71-metre high steeple, it dominated the town's skyline.

After the Reformation (1517), Count Arnold I – and along with him almost the whole county – adopted the Lutheran faith in 1544. In 1588, the County of Bentheim (Grafschaft Bentheim) converted to the Reformed faith under Count Arnold II. Thereafter, the church at the market belonged to the Reformed parish. Count Arnold II, however, had come into contact with Calvin's teachings while studying in Strasbourg. A further link to the faith came with his marriage to Countess Magdalena of Neuenahr, who confessed the Reformed faith. The few Catholics left in Nordhorn had to go to services at the Frenswegen Monastery.

In 1578, the Augustinian Canons bought the castle on the Vechte Island in Nordhorn. In the manor house they established, among other things, a chapel. Now the Catholics once more had a room for their services, albeit a small one. In 1712 a small church was built next to the castle. The Augustinian Canons chose – alongside Saint Ludger, their order's patron saint – Saint Augustine of Hippo as the church's first patron.

At the time of Secularization by the Reichsdeputationshauptschluss, the monastery at Frenswegen was abolished. The year 1824 was an important one for the Augustinian community: the county, which for centuries had belonged to either the Bishopric of Utrecht or the Bishopric of Münster, was assigned to the Diocese of Osnabrück, while the community itself was raised to the parish. The first minister was the Augustinian Canon Johann B. Cordes, who had been overseeing the community since 1810.

In 1826, the castle was converted into a church. In the late 19th century, the community grew very quickly; so plans were made to build a new, big church on the castle square on the Vechte. The castle was torn down. Models for the new church were found in Italy by the architect Keith from Hamburg, for instance, the Pantheon in Rome or the San Giorgio in Venice. The church's footprint is octagonal. From 1911 to 1913, the building work was finished and the church's consecration was celebrated. The steeple was built together with the church. To offset any influence that the tower might have on the impression that the dome was meant to give, the tower stands somewhat to the side. A two-story arcade joins the steeple to the church. It is 45 m high and houses four bells. The church's dome – a peculiarity in northern Germany – shapes Nordhorn's skyline. Over the massive iron-concrete dome arches a wooden, copper-covered outer dome, crowned with a lantern. Its total height is 35 m.

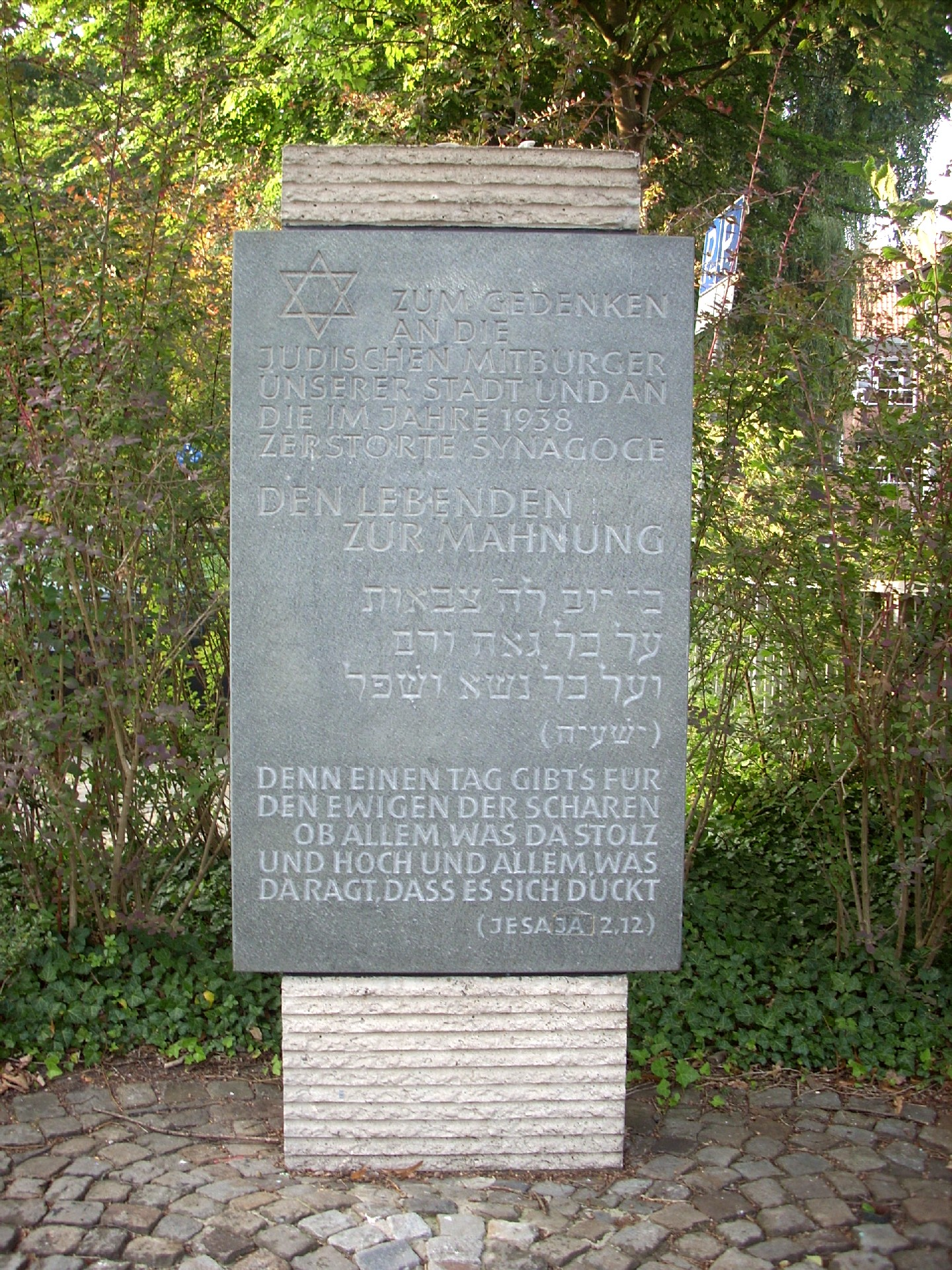
Synagogue memorial

Nordhorn's Lutheran Christians were first served from Lingen, and then from Bentheim. Once they had established their own parish, the Kreuzkirche ("Cross Church") was built in 1929 and 1930. Today, roughly 20% of Nordhorners count themselves as Lutherans. There are three Lutheran churches.

Altogether, there are twelve Houses of God available in Nordhorn, seven of which have been built since the Second World War.

Nordhorn's synagogue was destroyed on Kristallnacht (9 November 1938). The town's Jews either emigrated or were deported and murdered, an event now marked by a memorial.

== Population ==
Nordhorn has 57,730 inhabitants (as of 28 January 2026) in an area of 149.64 km^{2}, making the population density 398 per square kilometre.

Evangelical-Reformed Christians account for 28.14% of the population, while Lutherans account for 21.05% and Roman Catholics for 29.19%. Another 21.64% either are not members of any faith or adhere to other faiths.

=== Population development ===
(each time for 31 December)

Year	Inhabitants
1815	980
1851	1,356
1864	1,500
1895	2,041
1900	3,000
1929	18,000
1933	20,000
1961	39,429
1980	48,492
1990	49,359

Year	Inhabitants
1996	51,313
1998	51,649
2000	51,968
2002	52,615
2004	52,950
2006	53,156
2008	53,401
2010	53,052
2012	52,380
2014	52,579

Year	Inhabitants
2016	53,286
2017	53,278
2018	53,403
2019	53,711
2020	53,839
2021	54,162
2022	55,724
2023	56,675
2024	56,973
2025	57,359

== Politics ==
=== Mayors ===
Name	Term of office
Gilbertus Petrus Paulus Bauer (Boer)	1800–1812
Friedrich Anton Weber	1812–1821
Egbert Johann Conrad Vincke	1821–1832
Johann van Almelo	1832–1842
Friedrich Wilhelm Gerhard Brill (deputy)	1842–1843
Ernst Heinrich Friedrich Firnhaber	1843–1871
Derk van Delden	1872–1897
Ernst Heinrich Beins	1897–1915
Gerhard van Delden	1915–1919
Friedrich Fahlsing	1919–1927
Wilhelm Henn	1927–1933
Hermann Korte	1933–1934
Paul Gerhardt	1934–1945
Paul Drewer	1946–1948
Heinrich Barlage	1948–1952
Gerrit Brinkmann	1952–1956
Bernhard Opolony	1956–1961
Eberhard Liese	1961–1964
Wilhelm Buddenberg	1964–1972
Cornelius Gemmeker	1972–1981
Wilhelm Horstmeyer	1981–1986
Friedel Witte	1986–1999
Meinhard Hüsemann	1999–2011
Thomas Berling	2011–

Thomas Berling is the elected mayor until 2026.

=== Town council ===
After the municipal election on 12 September 2021, the 42 council seats were apportioned thus:

Party	Seats	Gains/losses from 2016
SPD	12 seats	– 5.4%
CDU	11 seats	– 8.9%
GRÜNE	6 seats	+ 4.3%
B!FN	6 seats	+13.5%
Die Linke	1 seat	−3.2%
FDP	2 seats	+1.7%
IPG	2 seats	−5.9%
AfD	2 seats	+3.8%

The mayor, Thomas Berling, is also a voting member of town council.

== Culture and sightseeing ==
=== Museums ===
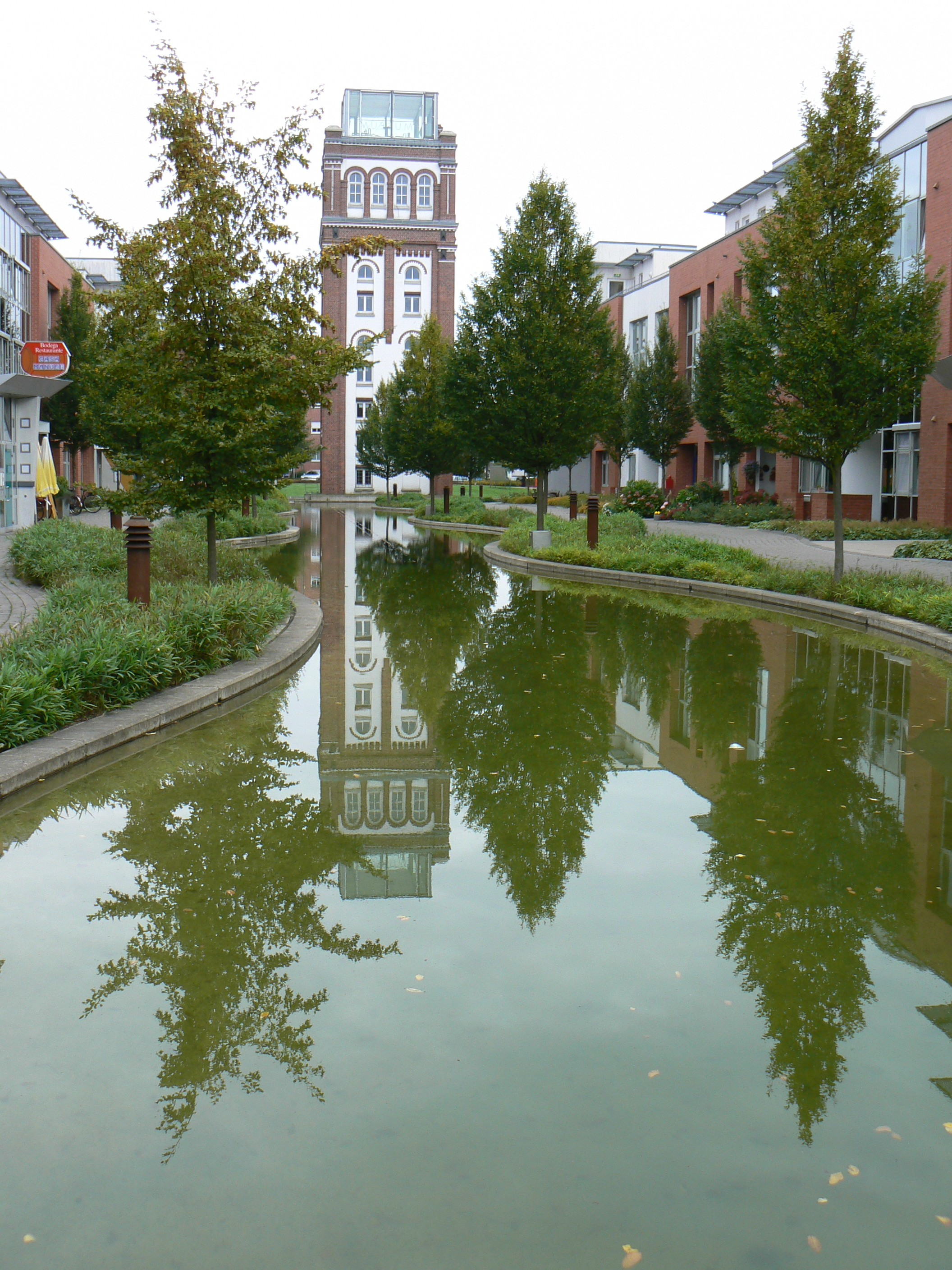
Povel Tower (Town Museum)

The Town Museum (Stadtmuseum) in the Povelturm was opened in October 1996. Within, one can inform oneself about Nordhorn's history. On the upper floor of the Povelturm is the museum café, which offers a view over Nordhorn from a height of 26 m.

=== Buildings ===
Nordhorn has mostly kept itself from being spoiled by the few individual building styles of the postwar years. The town's appearance has kept the appealing red brickwork that has long been a tradition in northern Germany and in the neighbouring Netherlands. It is even seen in modern buildings. The new district building, for instance, combines the local building materials of brick and sandstone with glass, concrete and copper.

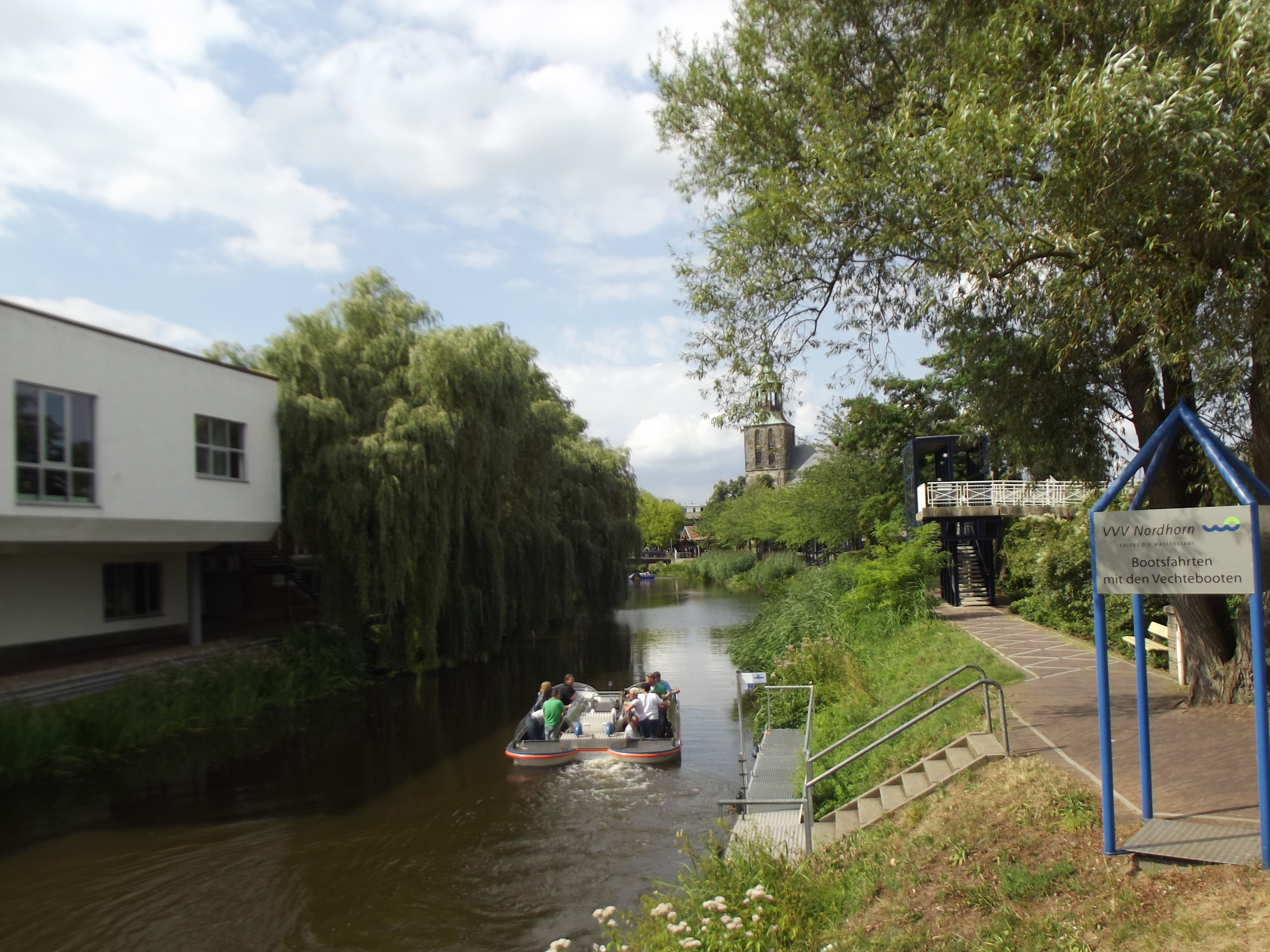
Gracht in "Wasserstadt" ("Watertown") Nordhorn

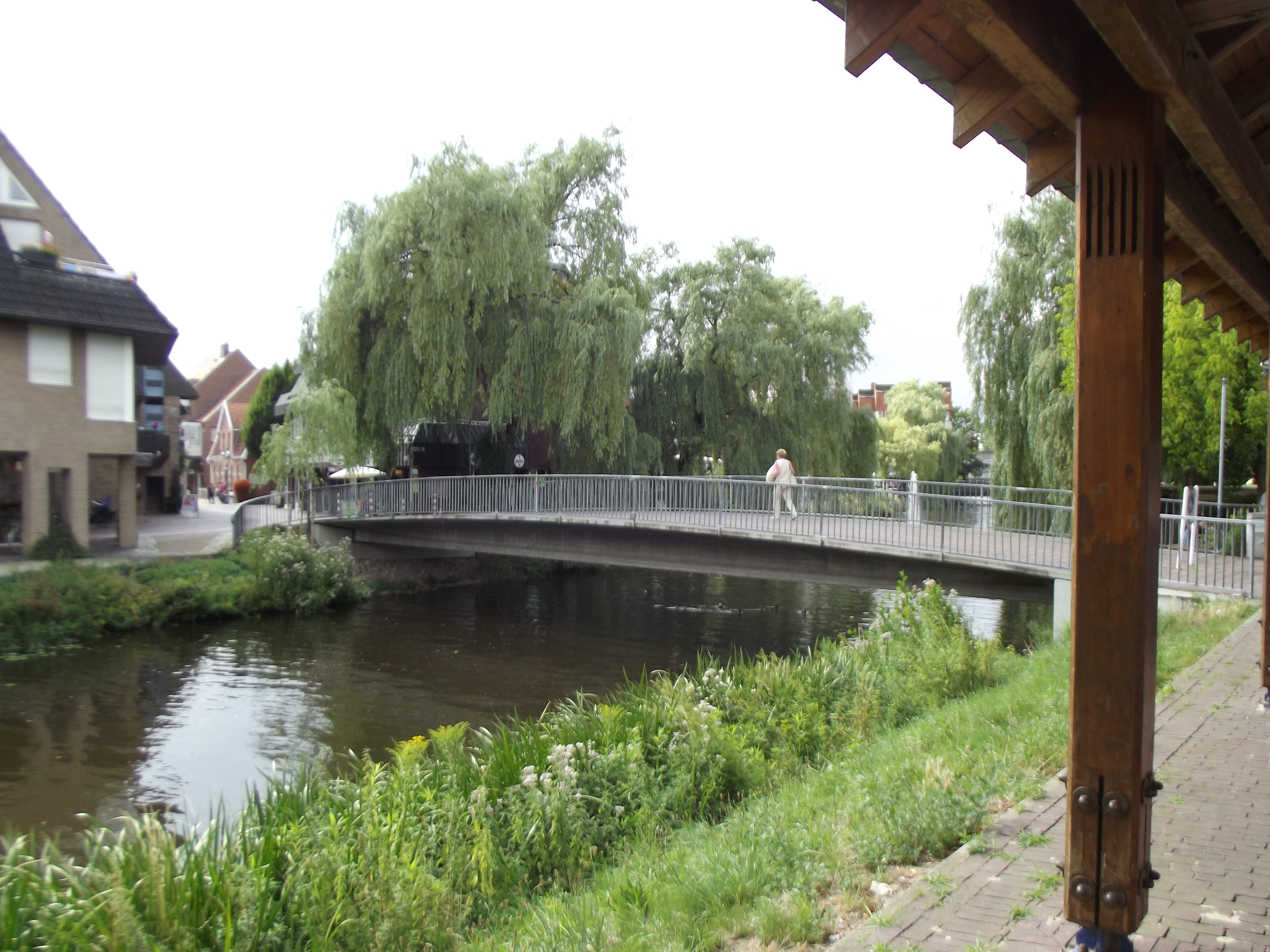
Marienburgbrück, named after Nordhorn's twin town Malbork

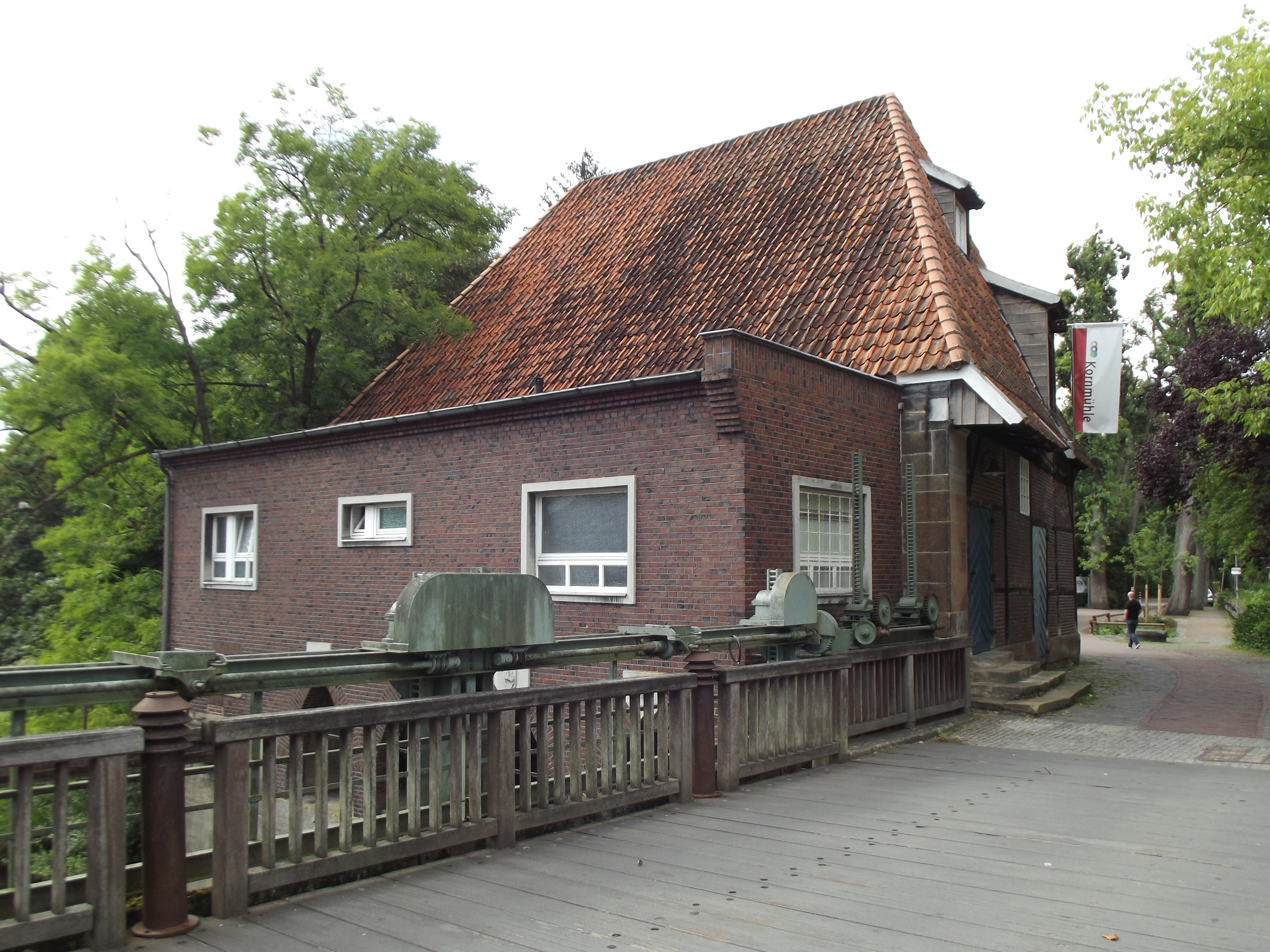
Old Gristmill, now home of a theater group

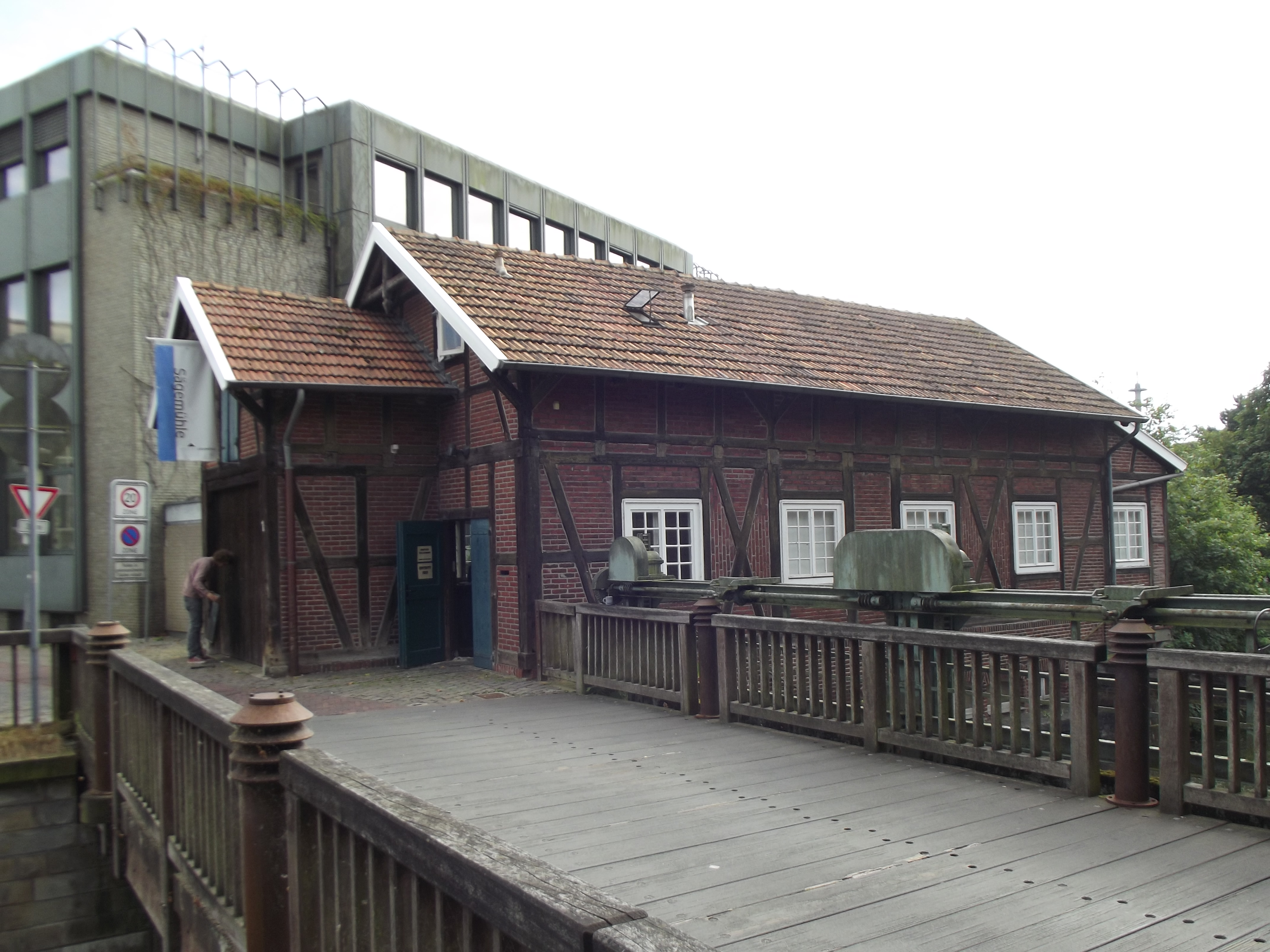
Old Sawmill, now an exhibition hall for artists

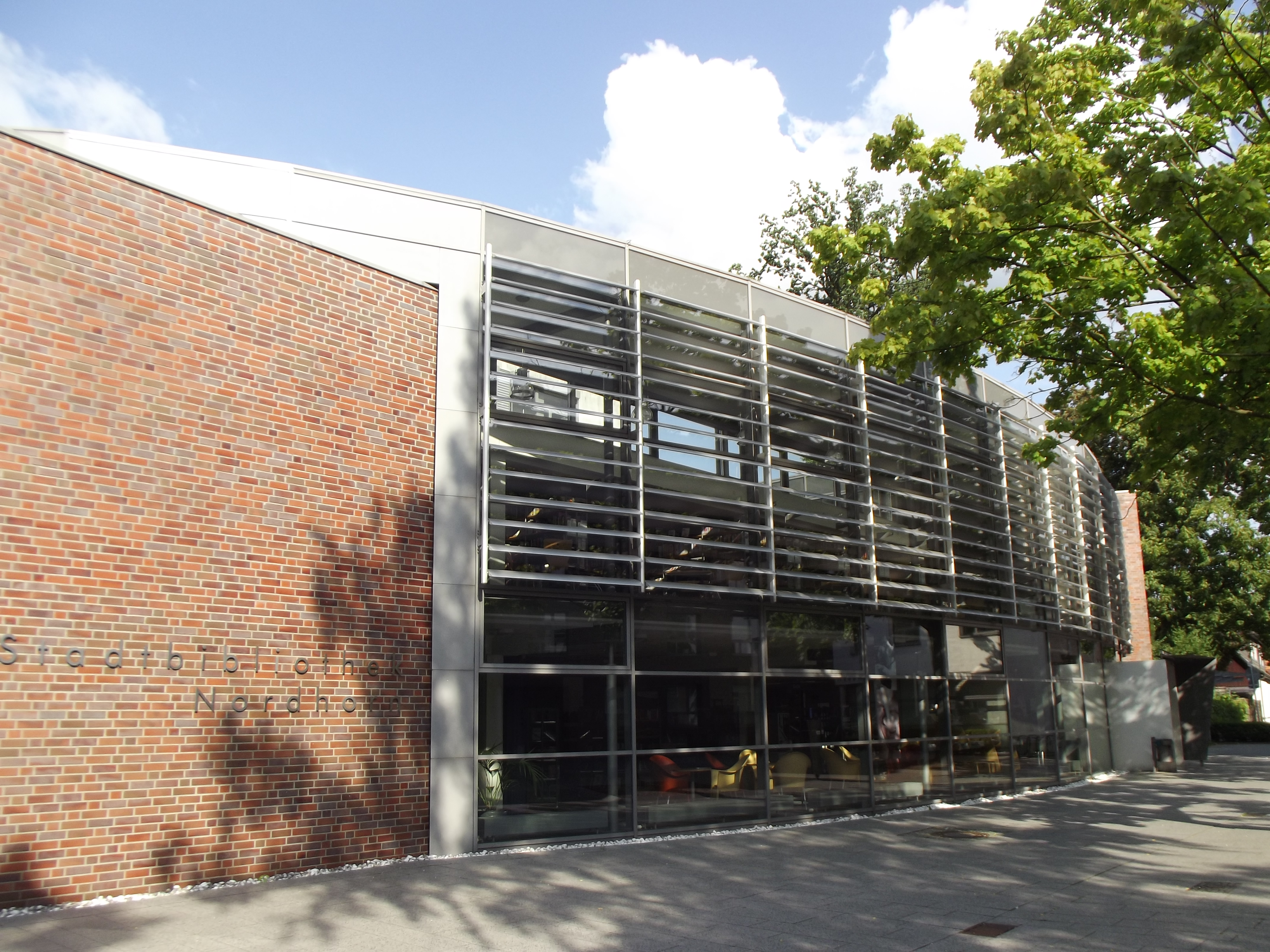
Public Library Nordhorn

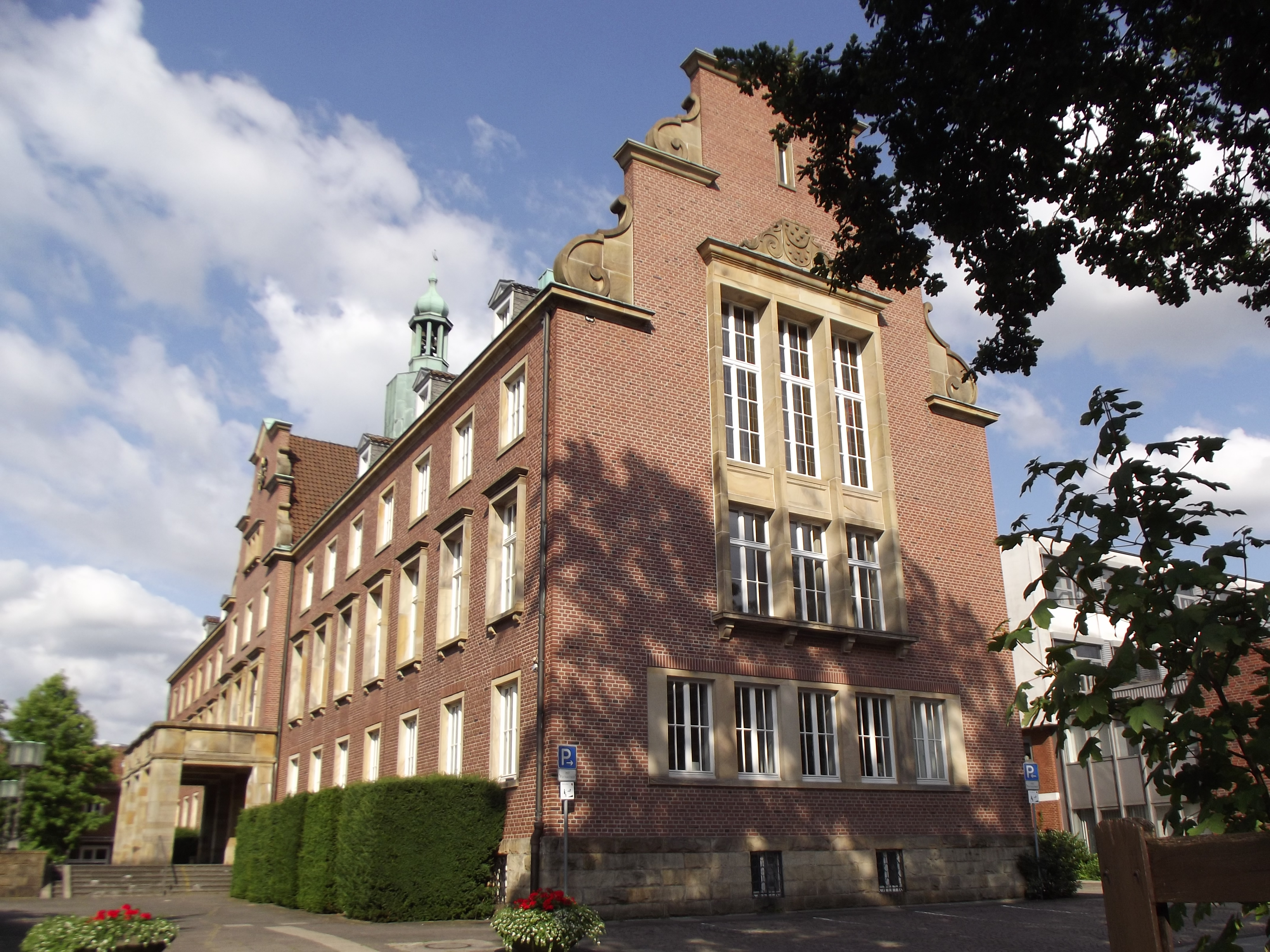
Town-hall Nordhorn

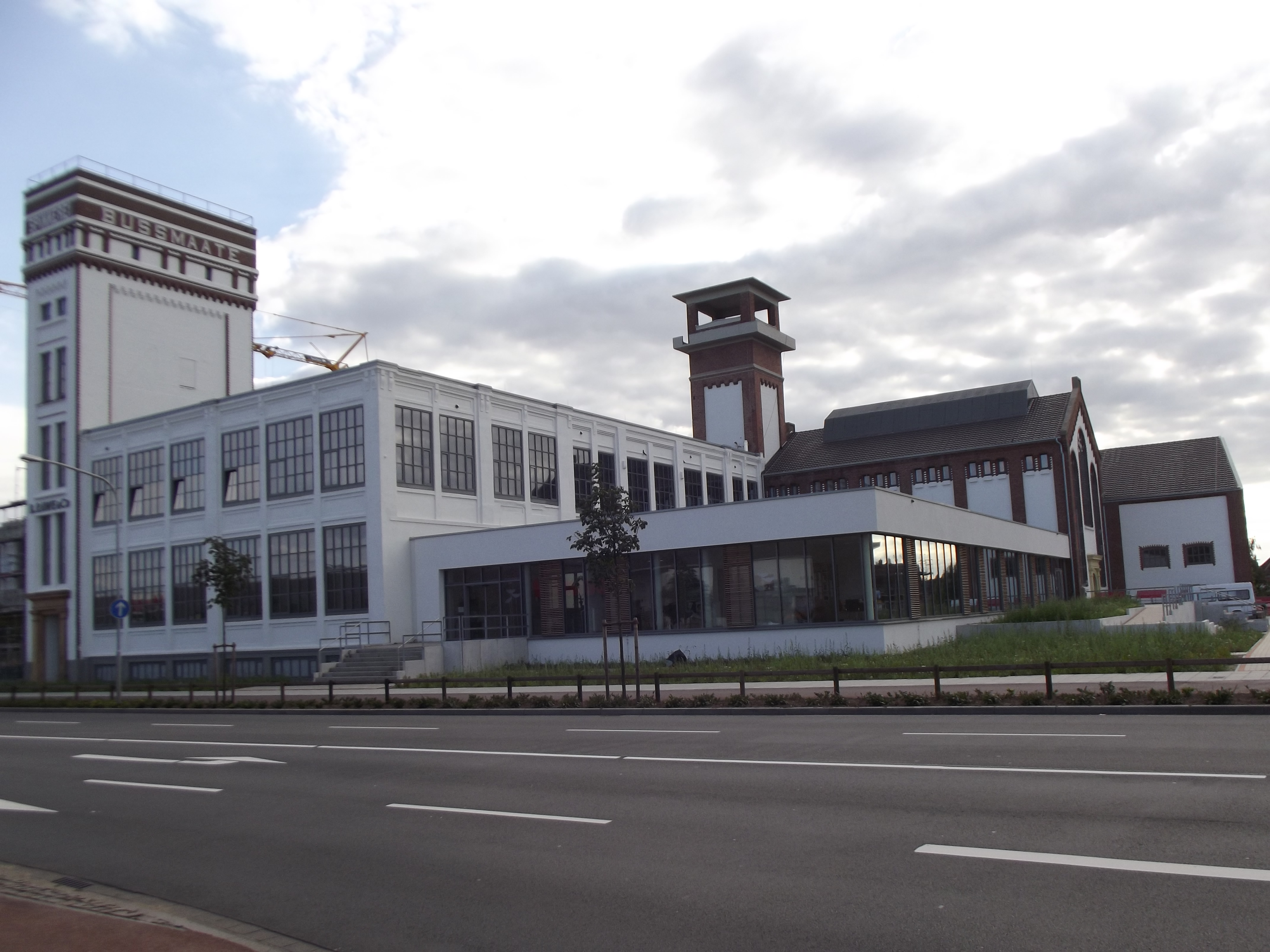
Old Textile Factory in Bussmaate

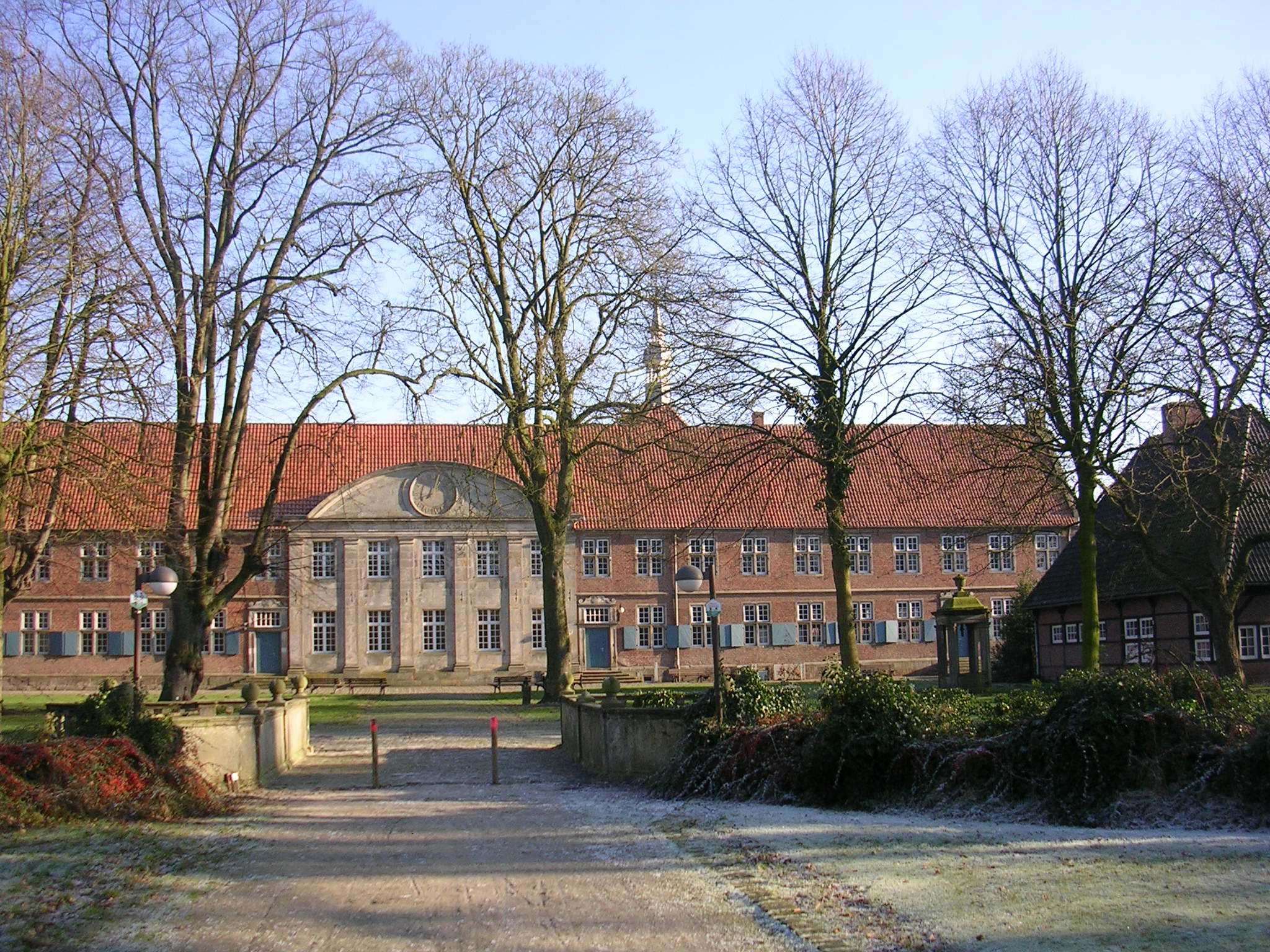
Frenswegen Monastery

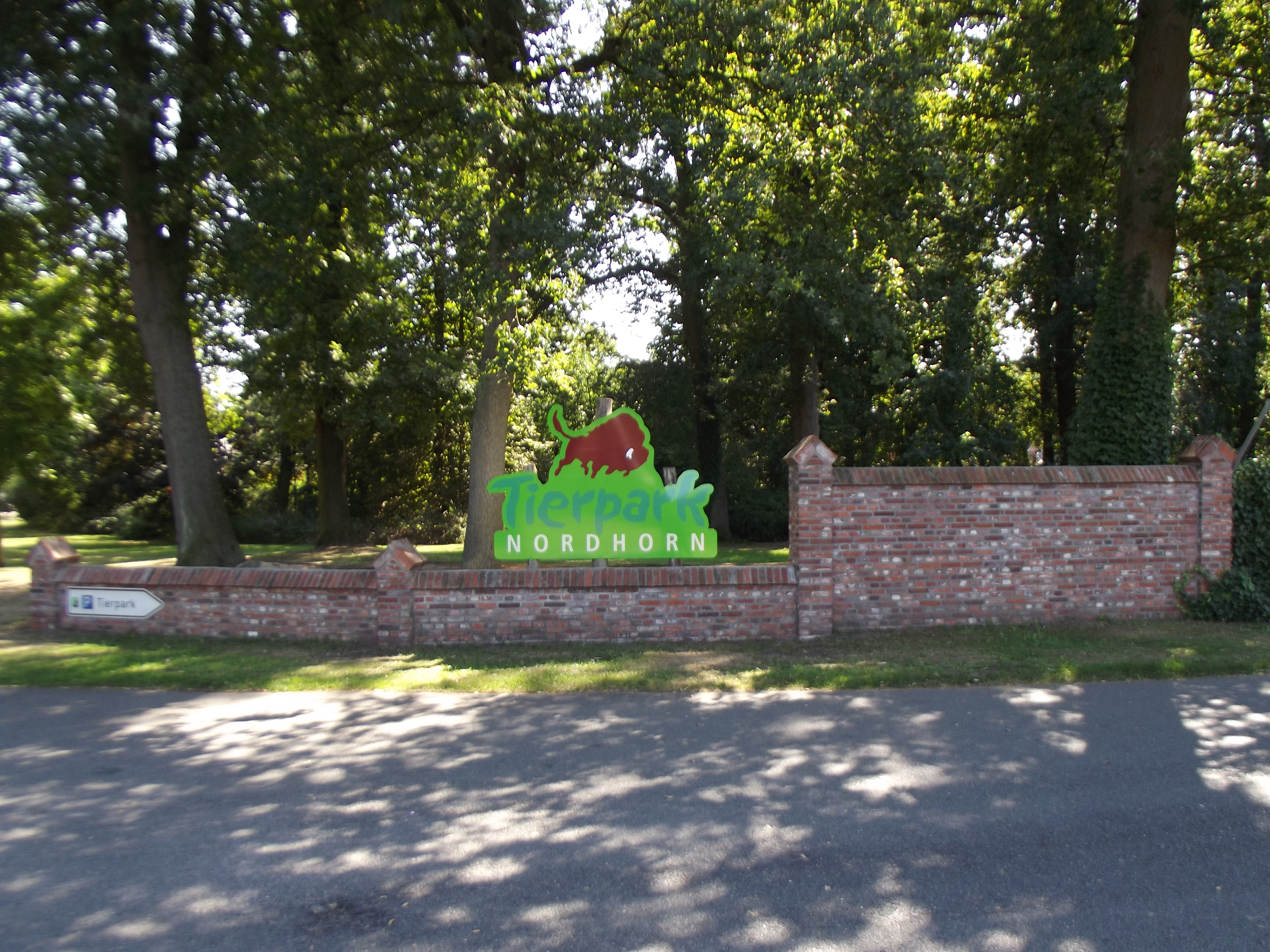
Roadsign for Tierpark Nordhorn

A fine example of restored architecture formerly overgrown by plant life is the Frenswegen Monastery from the 14th century in the town's northwest. A lightning strike in 1881 destroyed the church consecrated in 1445. The monastery buildings, however, were mostly preserved, even the square, two-floored cloister, the little wellhouse, the bridge over the moat, and the impressive cellar vaulting. On the east wing's outer façade, a "Madonna and Child" made of Bentheim sandstone attracts the beholder's attention. After cautious renovations, the building now houses an ecumenical educational and meeting place whose origin and basis the unusually broad mix of faiths in Nordhorn and its environs is.

Traces of Gothic mark the Reformed church, which stands defiantly in Brandlecht's old village centre. Among examples of Romanesque sculpture is this church's baptismal font, which is Nordhorn's oldest artwork, made out of Bentheim sandstone, and still holds its original importance today.

At present, two buildings characterize Nordhorn's skyline. The Alte Kirche on the marketplace, built out of Bentheim sandstone in the 15th century and the Augustinuskirche, built in 1913 on the former castle's lands, can both be seen from afar. The inner town, today as in days of yore an island around which flows the Vechte, is now a pedestrian precinct.

Painstakingly restored façades, modern arcades, shops, boutiques, and outdoor cafés invite one to tarry. The oldest building on the main street is the former mayor and chemical manufacturer Firnhaber's house, in which he both lived and worked. Behind the two-story classicist façade, the triangular gable with its hipped roof and a round-arched window with a plaster swag, the tradition of Nordhorn's first apothecary lives on.

In gardens, behind old trees and tall rhododendron hedges, manor houses may be discovered. These villas built on Dutch models were textile manufacturers' homes a hundred years ago. A walk through Nordhorn will in many places also still bring to light signs of the recent and more distant past, be it the town hall completed in 1952 with its little belltower or the old well at the park at the Völlinkhoff. The town park pays tribute to a time when the heavy blocks of sandstone used in the oil mill's edge runner still fulfilled their original function.

When the grist mill and sawmill on the milldam were shut down, an almost 600-year history of milling came to an end in Nordhorn. These buildings have been renovated and now serve as appealing venues for cultural events.

Nordhorn's industrial history was written by, among others, the Povel textile plant, which shut its gates in 1979 after nearly a hundred years of production. As a last witness to the town's economic heyday early in the last century, the former spinning works tower has been maintained as an industrial memorial. It serves today as a museum. The upper floor can be hired for private celebrations.

In the Bussmaate, a former boggy area, another textile plant with an adjoining residential area for textile workers was built a hundred years ago. In the early 1950s, Professor Emanuel Lindner, lecturer at Bauhaus and student of Mies van der Rohe, together with architect Eberhard Heinrich Zeidler, who now lives in Canada, designed expansion building works for this business. With a clearly structured glass façade, the timeless industrial building fits seamlessly into the industrial complex dating from the Gründerzeit. This building today stands empty and is to be converted for urban development.

=== Landscape ===
The Vechte's riverine landscape and the canals with their rows of trees are a popular place for a walk, and to enjoy the idyll. The canals, built more than 100 years ago for transport and draining the moorlands, now form part of a faunal habitat with many species and are now used for leisure and recreation. Sluices made out of sandstone and clinker, some still worked by hand, separate different water levels, and are popular destinations for nature lovers. Fields and meadows frame farmlands on the town's outskirts. Wetlands and heathlands with birches, junipers, and orchids growing wild are marks of this rustic landscape. In the Tillenberge a small protected area with heather, gnarled oaks and junipers.

A fine legacy from the Gründerzeit is the Town Park (Stadtpark), a villa park of one of the earliest manufacturers. At the concert bowl in the Town Park, concerts regularly take place.

== Sport ==
=== Euregium ===
The Euregium was actually built for the HSG Nordhorn. The name comes from the Euregio. The HSG team plays in the first handball Bundesliga. The Euregium is also used for other cultural events. It lies right near the vocational school and the district sports hall. The three halls' proximity to each other makes it possible to stage great tournaments. The Euregium has for a few years now been the venue for the Grafschafter Sportgala.

=== Eissporthalle ===
The Eissporthalle – "Ice Sport Hall" – has wed ice hockey and figure skating into one ice sport club. It was built in the mid-1970s. In 1984, the band BAP gave a concert there.

The ice sports club in Nordhorn changed its name several times. Until 1999 there was the GEC Nordhorn, which, among other things, played in the hockey Bundesliga, in what was then the second-highest class. Thereafter the club called itself EC Euregio Nordhorn 1999 e. V. In 2002, the Eissporthalle was renovated from the ground up. Following a heated debate over further renovation work, the Eissporthalle was torn down in November 2024.

=== Regular events ===
Yearly, over Whitsun weekend, a great table tennis tournament, the Euregioturnier is held. At the outdoor swimming pool there is also an international swimming tournament at Whitsun. The VfL Weiße Elf Nordhorn stages every year, also over Whitsun weekend, the Pfingstturnier ("Whitsun Tournament"), a traditional C-youth soccer tournament. In 2007 they held their 25th yearly tournament. The teams that take part come from all over Germany as well as from other European countries such as the Netherlands, Poland, and Hungary.

=== German record ===
The football team Heseper SV, whose home field is in Nordhorn's south end, is a German record holder. Between 1996 and October 1999, the team managed to play a streak of 98 championship matches without being beaten, managing at the same time to rise from the fifth to the second district class. TSV Buchbach had held the old record with an unbeaten streak of only 75 matches.

== Economy and infrastructure ==
=== Industry ===
Industrialization brought about a rise in population from 2,540 in 1903 to 18,104 in 1930, rising to 50,000 in the textile industry's heyday from the 1950s to 1970s.

Today, Nordhorn has roughly 57,700 inhabitants, and the trend is upward.

Once Nordhorn's biggest textile firm with up to 6,000 employees, NINO was one of Europe's leading textile producers until the 1980s. This stands out not least of all in cooperative efforts with renowned fashion photographers like Karl Lagerfeld and Helmut Newton. The only clothing manufacturer still in business in Nordhorn is Erfo Bekleidungswerk GmbH & Co. KG. The three formerly biggest companies, NINO, Povel, and Rawe, are no longer operating.

Since the textile industry waned, mostly midsize businesses from various service and production areas have settled in town, albeit without quite managing to offset job losses due to the textile industry's virtual death. Even though Citibank's temporary presence, with 550 jobs, eventually folded – despite massive local subsidies – the location is still quite attractive for service businesses. This can be seen in the latest firm to be located in town, Bertelsmann, which will soon have 250 jobs. ETF EUROPEAN TRUCK FACTORY GmbH is located in this town.

Taken together, however, the shift in structure to the tertiary sector in and around Nordhorn, unlike in other regions, is very far advanced. The greater Nordhorn area is well off when compared with the country as a whole, with the Nordhorn employment agency area (Agenturbezirk) reporting the lowest jobless rate in Lower Saxony. The neighbouring region of Rheine in North Rhine-Westphalia, too, is experiencing a peak in employment. This is further substantiated in the 2005 land use planning report from the Federal Office for Building and Regional Planning (Bundesamt für Bauwesen und Raumordnung) in which is discussed a forecast, based on current indicators, that sees in northwestern North Rhine-Westphalia and Nordhorn and its environs an area with great economic dynamism in the coming years.

What should be highlighted is the great number of food markets in Nordhorn, with Nordhorn having roughly twice the sales area proportionally by population as the national average. Because of the often misguided evictions, however, of newer locations outside the integrated sites, there are many empty premises in the inner town.

In March 2007, the Rawe-Ring-Center with roughly 22 000 m^{2} of new sales area was opened on a plot that was once part of the Rawe textile factory. This project met with considerable opposition, mainly among local retailers and professionals. The retailers feared that the glut of new premises would bring about further vacancies, especially in the southern inner town, while professionals criticized the consequences for urban development, the lack of cleanup operations and above all the demolition of factory buildings that were protected as monuments. Despite 12,000 Nordhorners' protest signatures gathered by the Pro Grafschaft initiative, the project was endorsed by a majority of the local politicians and in the end put into action.

Under the slogan "Nordhorn – Die Wasserstadt" ("Nordhorn – the Water Town"), the town fathers are now seeking to put the emphasis on new aspects of the town's development, bringing forth plans to open canals for pleasure boats and to further development by building a town harbour. Whether these plans will indeed be implemented, and to what extent, remains to be seen in the coming years,

Also found at Nordhorn is the controversial bombing range, the Nordhorn Range. After the Second World War, this was first run by the Royal Air Force, but then later by the German Bundeswehr.

=== Transport ===
Nordhorn has two railway stations (Nordhorn and Nordhorn-Blanke), which are served by the RB 56 train service going to Neuenhaus and Bad Bentheim. These trains are operated by Bentheimer Eisenbahn and operate hourly. Passenger train services to Nordhorn resumed on 7 July 2019, which had been the second-largest town in Germany without passenger trains for 45 years.

The combined length of the road network in Nordhorn is 586.5 km (364.4 mi), of which 28 km (17.4 mi) is Bundesstraßen, 10.8 km (6.7 mi) is state highways (Landstraßen), 30.6 km (19.0 mi) is district roads (Kreisstraßen) and 517.1 km (321.3 mi) is town streets and roads. Altogether, Nordhorn has 2,807 parking spaces. The town lies near two Autobahnen, the A 30 and the A 31. It is furthermore connected to the highway network through two Bundesstraßen, the B 403 and the B 213.

The most popular means of transport in town is what is locally known as the Fietse – the bicycle (Fahrrad in Standard German, fiets in Dutch). The Nordhorners' fondness for the Fietse and their morning rides led to the building of a special cycling path network that runs throughout the district of Grafschaft Bentheim. Signposts, known locally as Paddestolen, show cyclists the way on these Fietsenpads (also a local term, the standard German word for them being Radwege). Cycle paths to the neighbouring Netherlands are in use.

Nordhorn has at its disposal a small airport in the outlying centre of Klausheide, called Nordhorn-Lingen (EDWN).

Through an initiative by the club Graf-SHIP, founded in 2003, state councillor Friedrich Kethorn approved on 14 November 2005 the reopening of the Ems-Vechte-Kanal to shipping, now allowing captains to bring ships of up to 12 m in length through the canal. Approval for the other two canals continues. The Klukkert-Hafen (port) was opened once again in 2006.

=== Culture ===
==== Old weaving mill ====
The old weaving mill once belonged to the Povel factory. Nowadays, the old weaving mill is a cultural centre for exhibitions, tourism, and concerts. In the mill's building are found, alongside the county brewhouse, a musical pub for live acts and also Ems-Vechte-Welle, a regional radio station for Grafschaft Bentheim and the Emsland.

==== Jugendzentrum Nordhorn ====
The Jugendzentrum Nordhorn – Nordhorn Youth Centre – has existed since the early 1970s. It was Germany's first youth centre and is therefore also its oldest. It was once a farm. At first, only the "threshing floor" was used, but in the 1980s, the "barn" also came into use. In the 1980s, the barn was also the scene of the punk movement in Nordhorn.

Concerts were held in the barn, and still are, with such acts as Cochise, Geier Sturzflug, Helge Schneider, Killerpilze, Rammstein, Wir sind Helden and In Extremo. Early in 2007, the barn's ceiling lining was destroyed by a storm, but with help from unpaid workers, the youth centre had a complete, new paint job inside by the summer.

=== Tierpark Nordhorn ===
Nordhorn's animal park harbours on his premises compounds for exotic and also home-grown domestic animals, as well as a museum, a farm, a traditional pub and a playground.

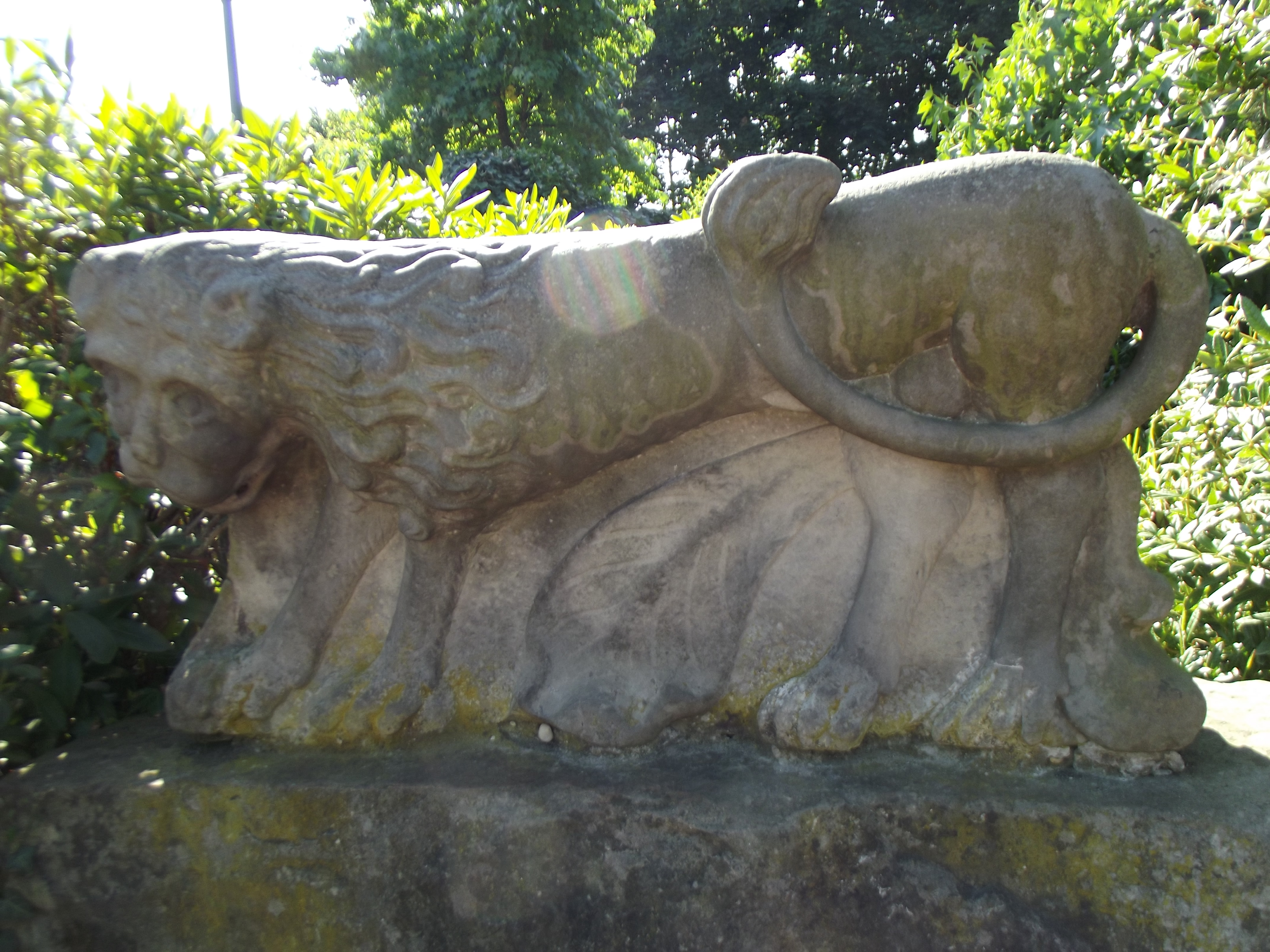
Medieval stucco depiction of a lion at the entrance

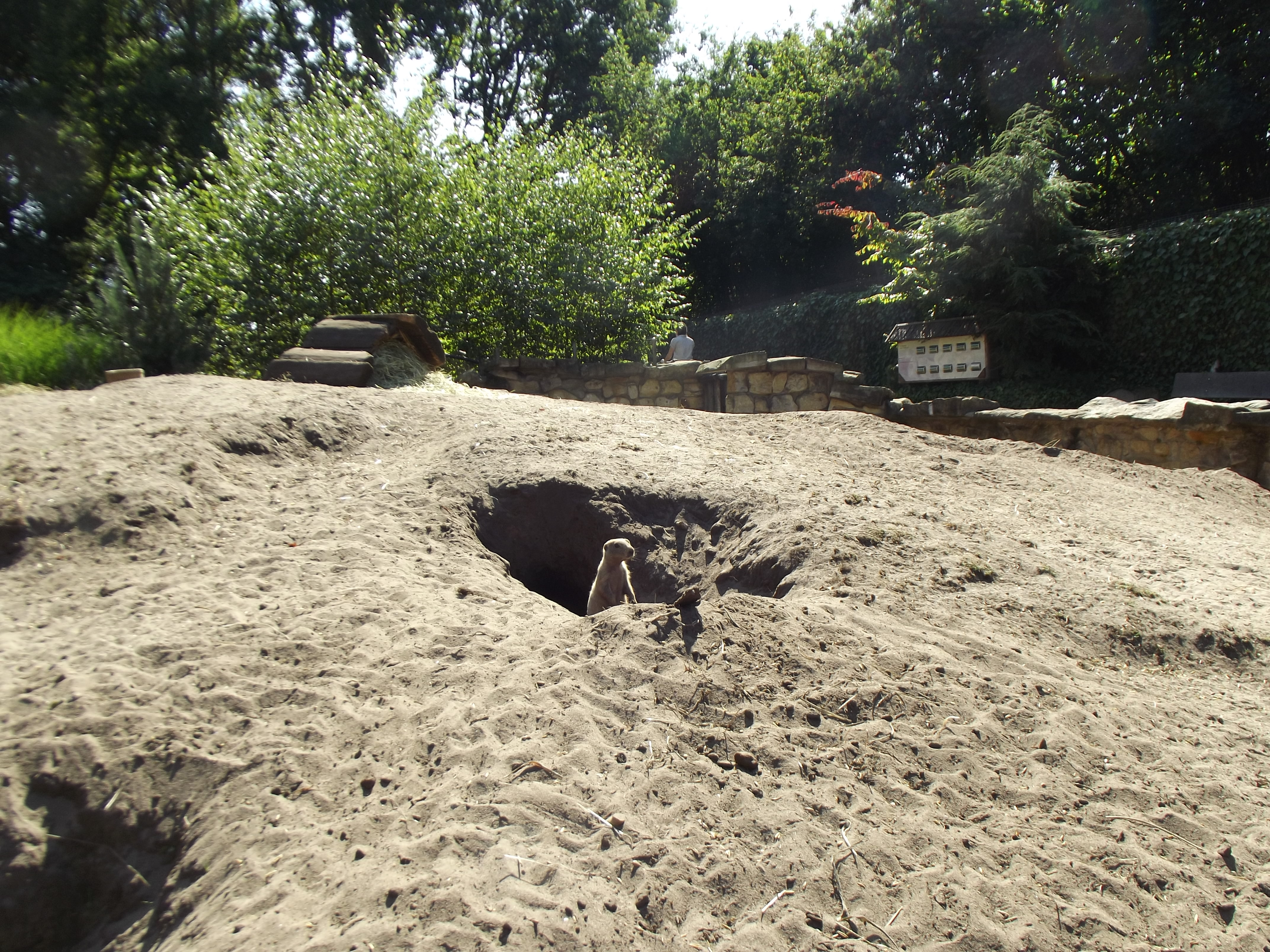
Meerkat compound

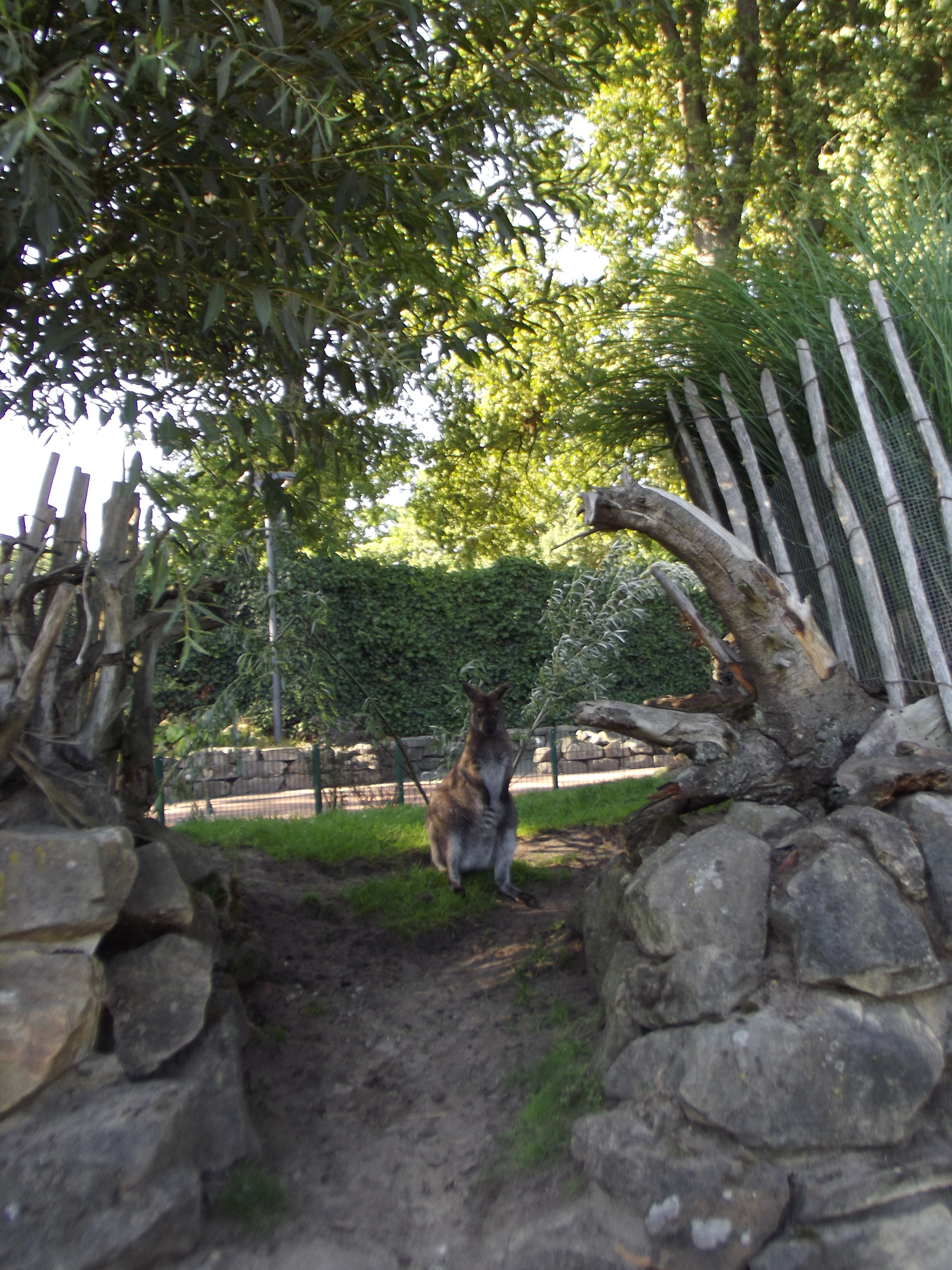
Kangaroo compound

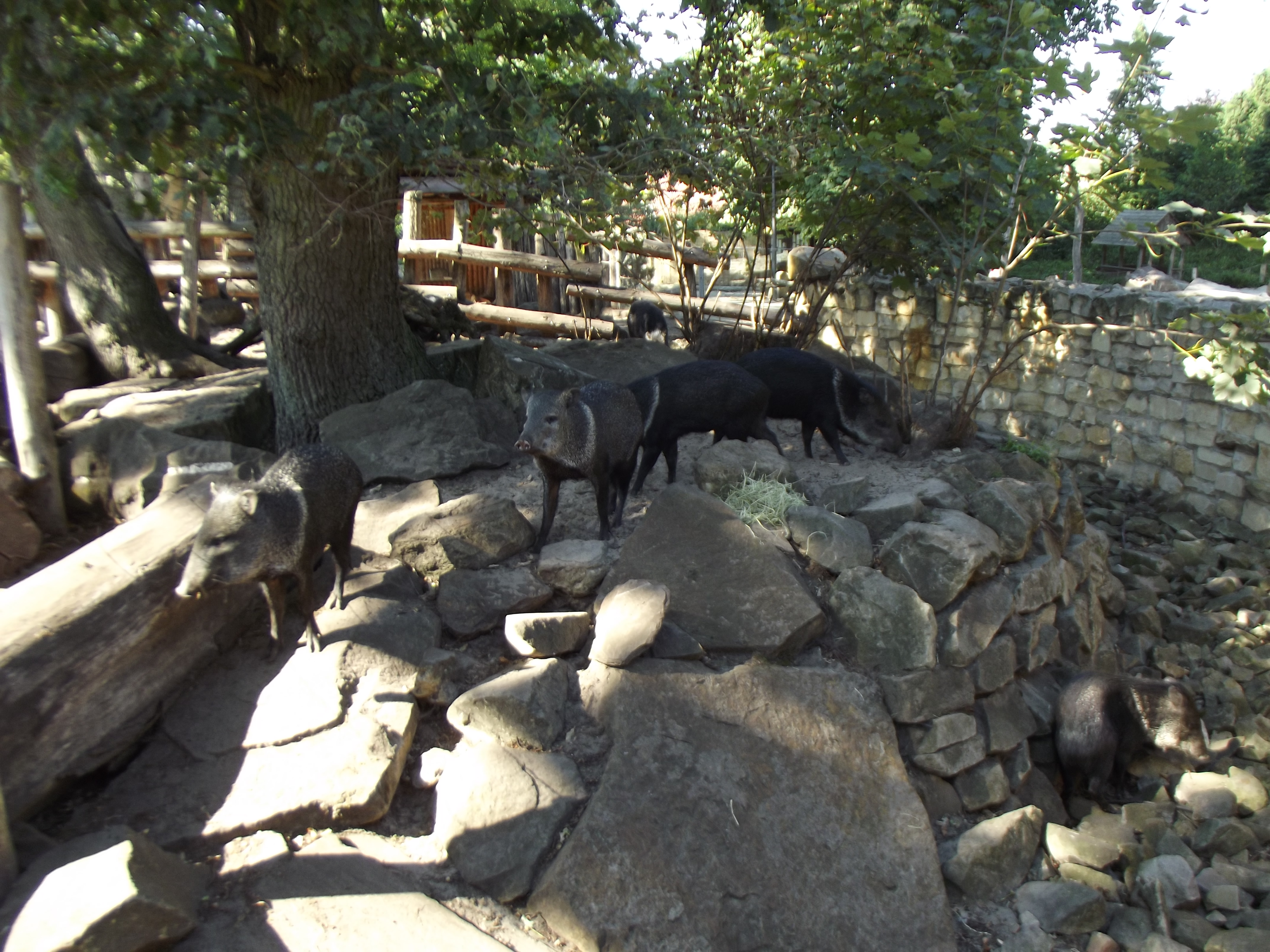
Wild boars

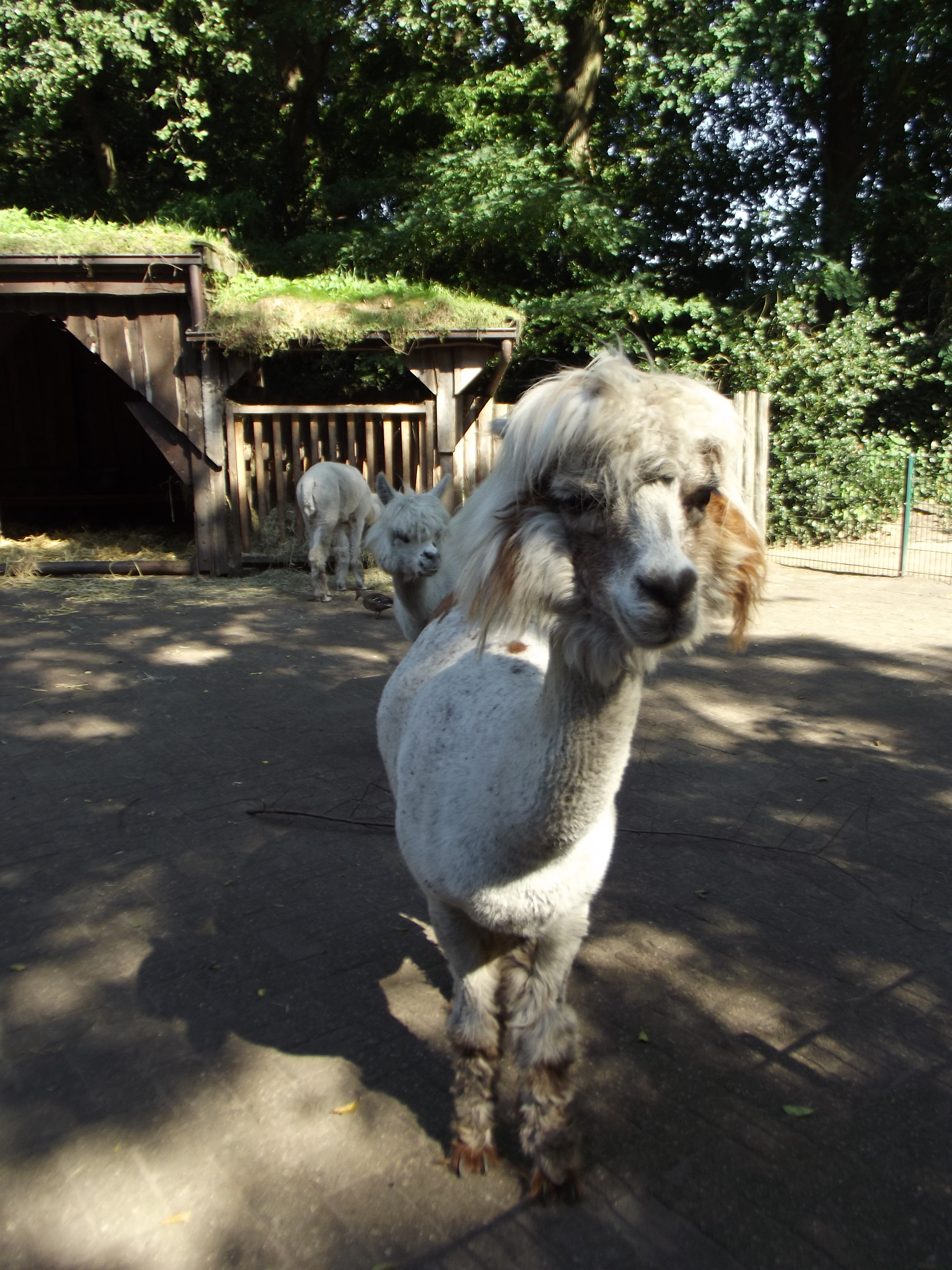
Llama compound

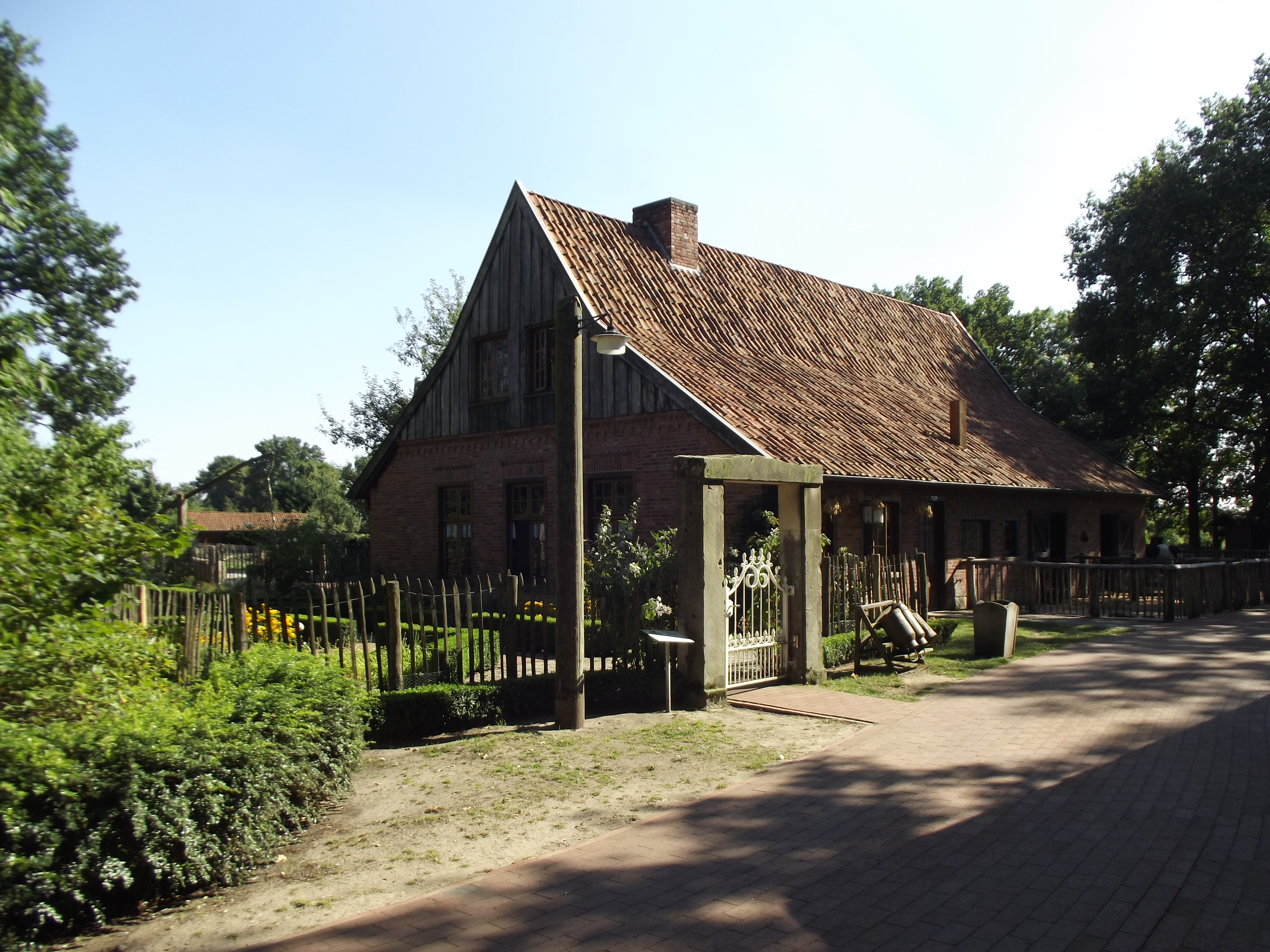
Farm museum "Vechtehof"

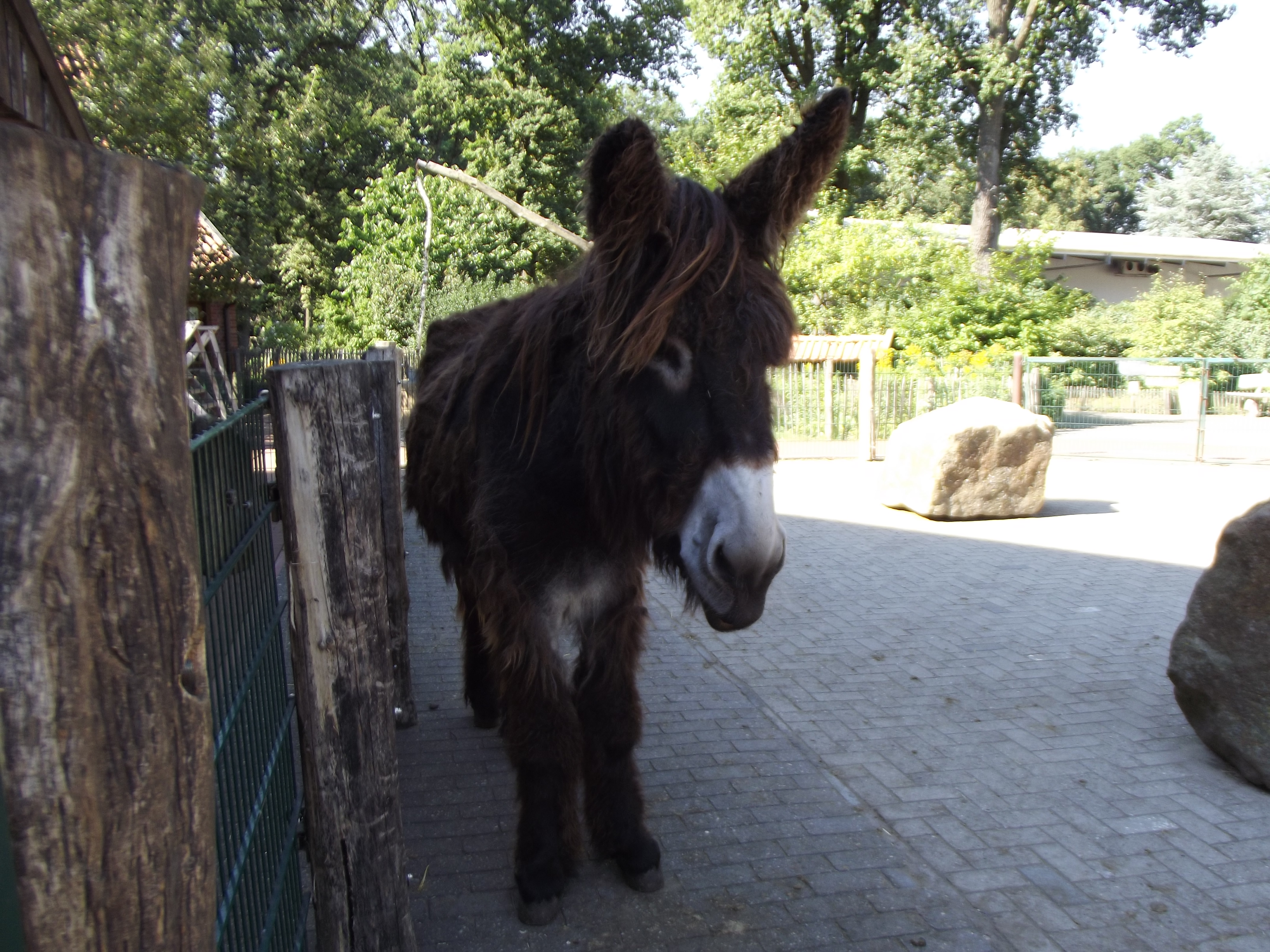
Poitou donkey, Vechtehof

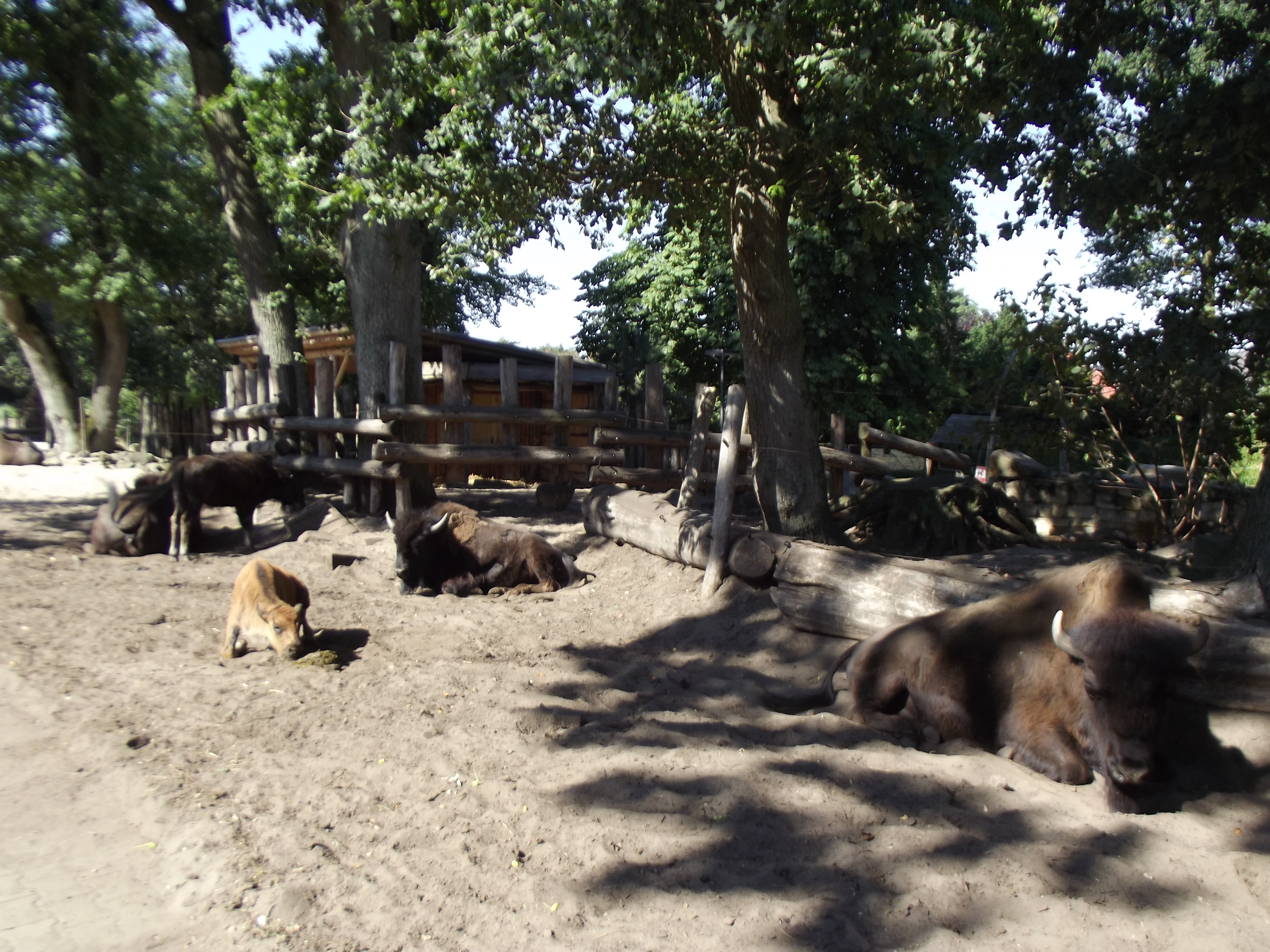
Wood bisons

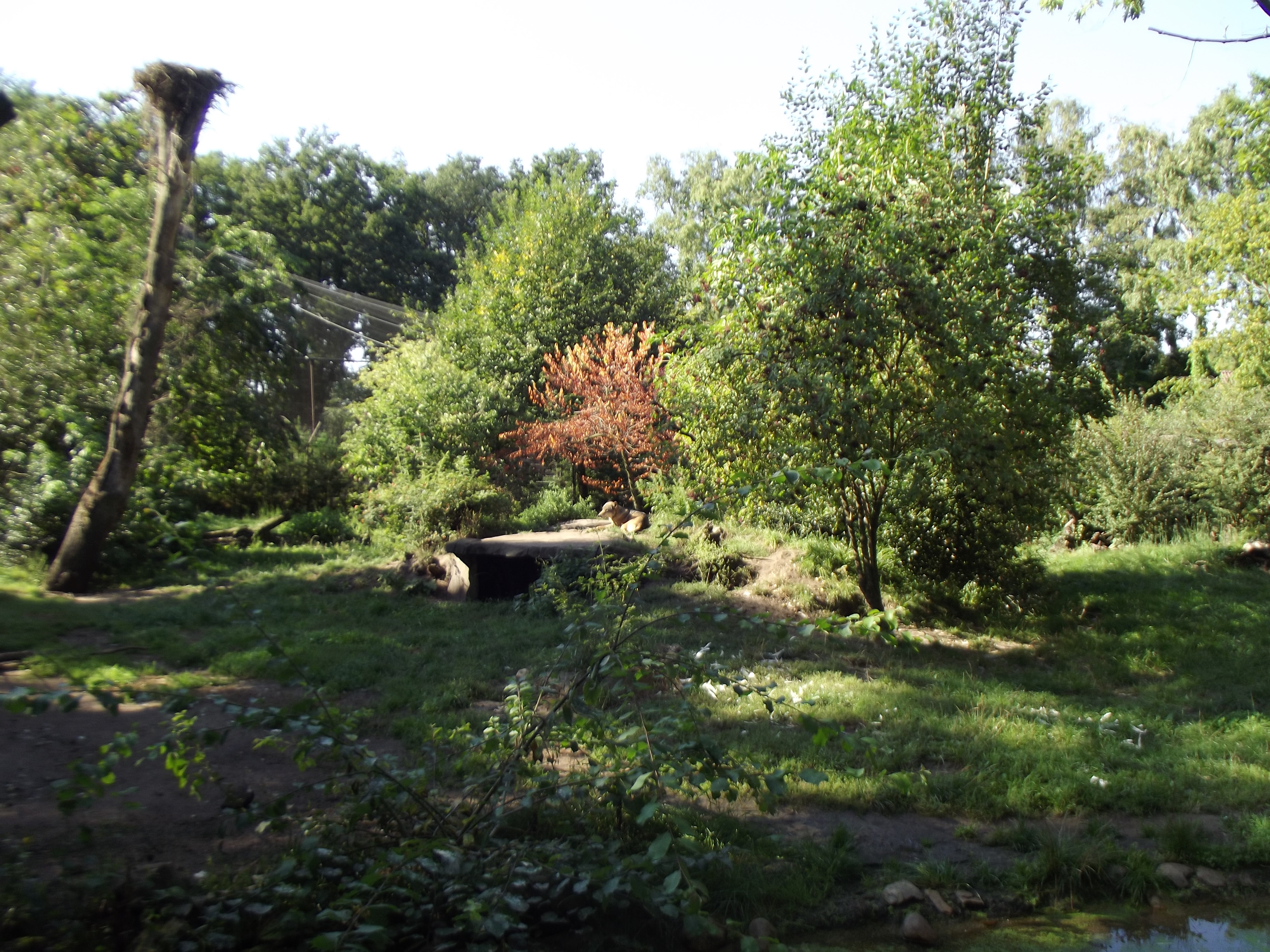
Wolf compound

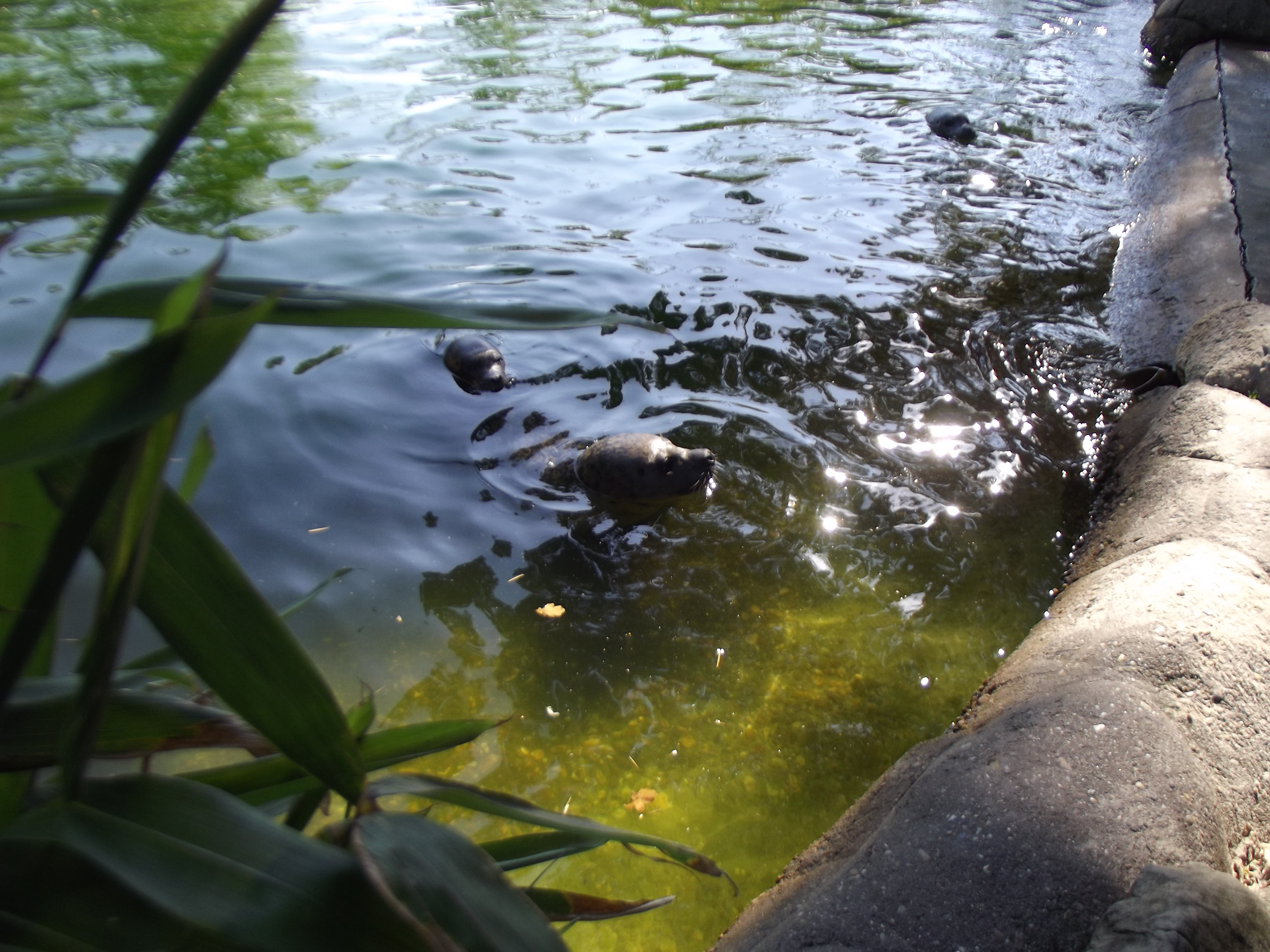
Harbour seals

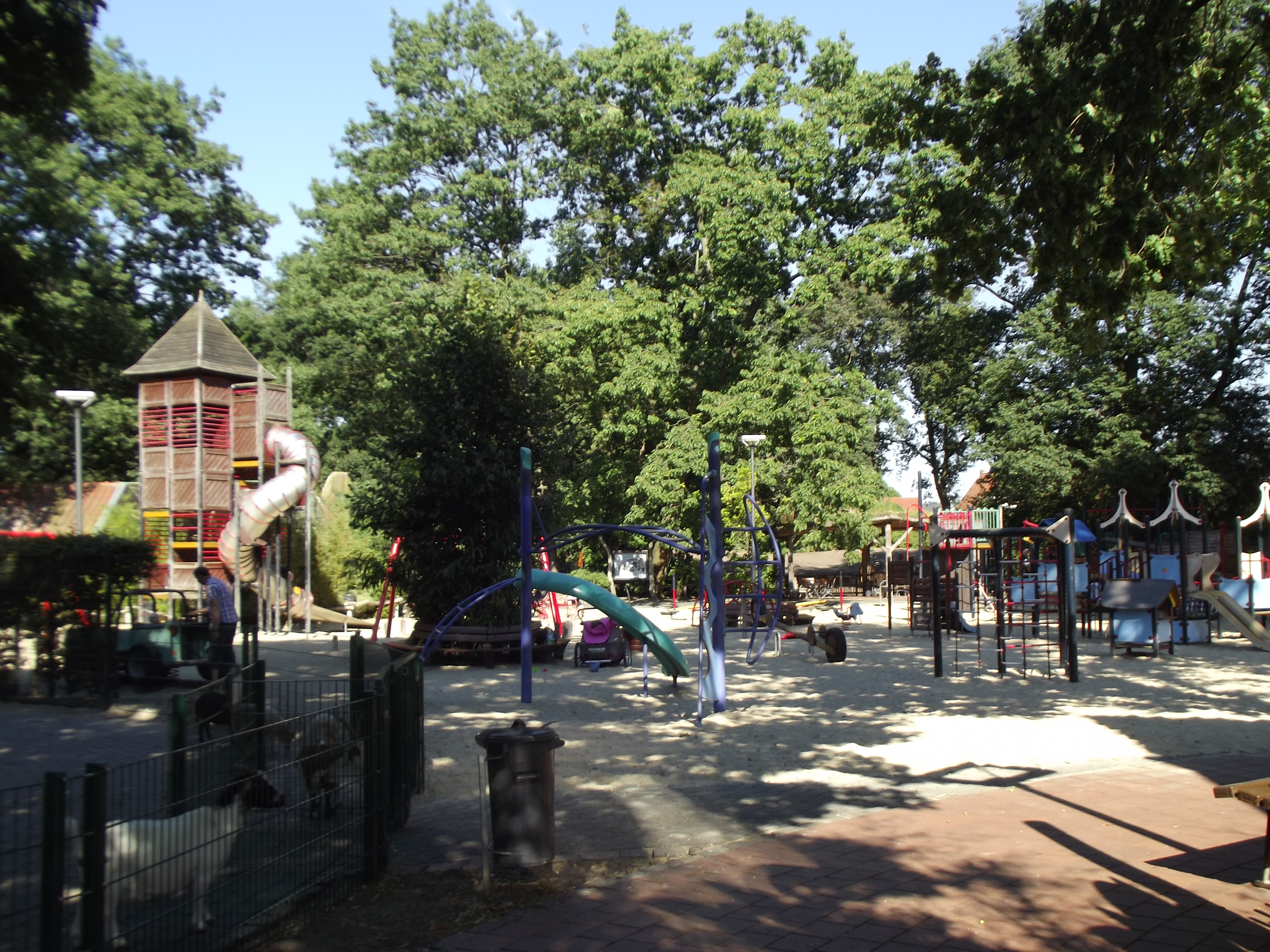
Playground Tierpark Nordhorn

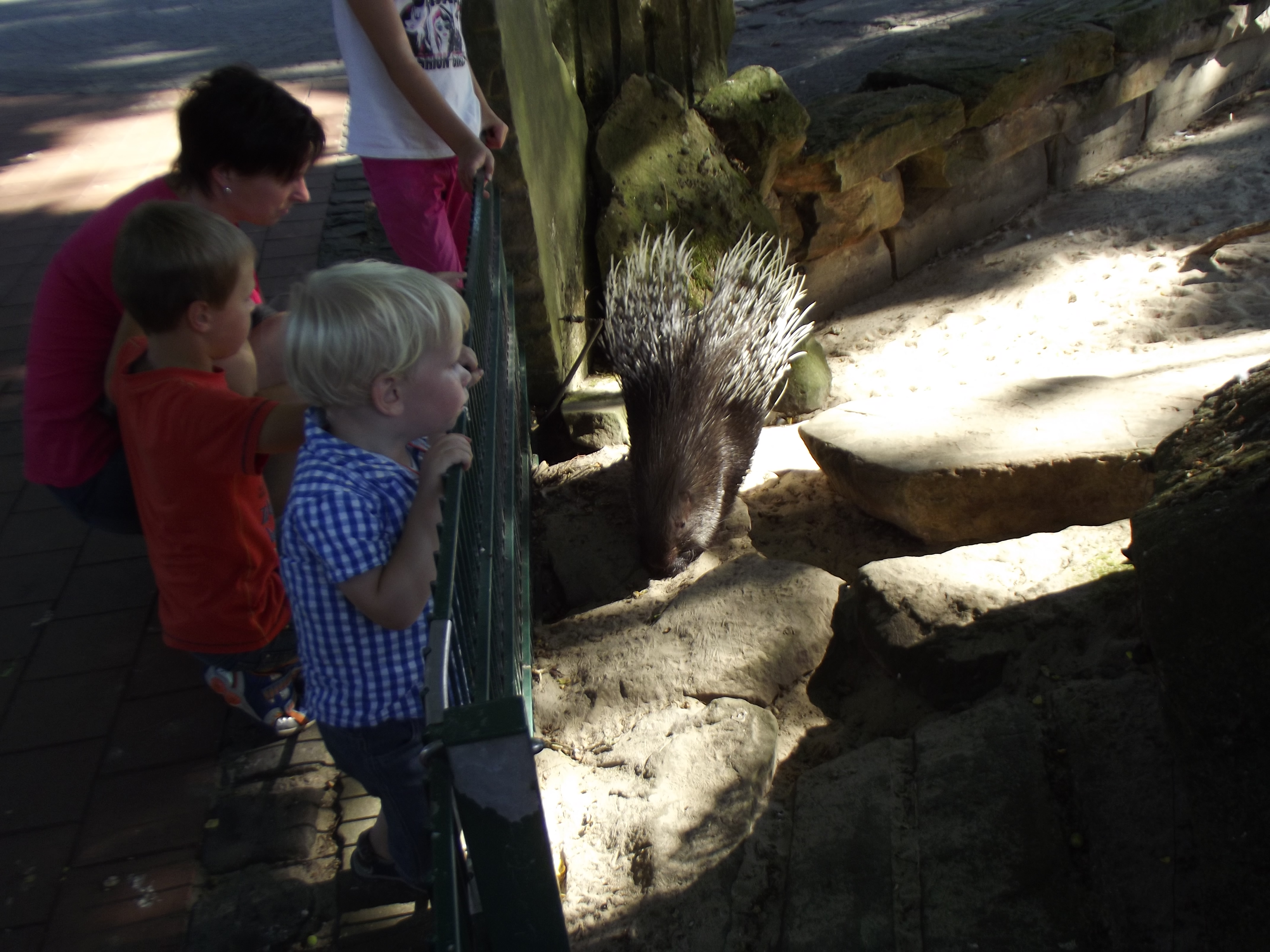
Porcupine compound and interested watchers

=== Social institutions ===
==== Lebenshilfe Nordhorn ====
The Lebenshilfe – an institution dedicated to helping those with handicaps live full lives – was founded as early as 1963.

Now, the institution's organs assist, attend, and take care of well over 600 people with handicaps. These organs include kindergarten for early assistance, various homes, and also various workplaces (such as carpentry workshops), where clients can go with the proper guidance and according to each one's interests and talents. As well, there is the musical band Tabuwta, made up wholly of people with handicaps and supported by Lebenshilfe educational employees and celebrities such as Guildo Horn. In 2005 they recorded their third CD and presented it at the old weaving mill.

==== Vechtetalschule ====
The Vechtetalschule – Vechte Valley School – has existed as a school for those with a very broad array of handicaps since 1989. In 1992 it moved to a new building. It was given its name in 1997. Now, the school has 210 pupils, divided into 27 classes, ten of which are in outlying locations. Employed at the school are roughly 90 employees along with those doing community service (instead of military service), would-be teachers and trainees. Levels currently run at the school are Primary, Secondary I, and Secondary II.

== Notable people ==
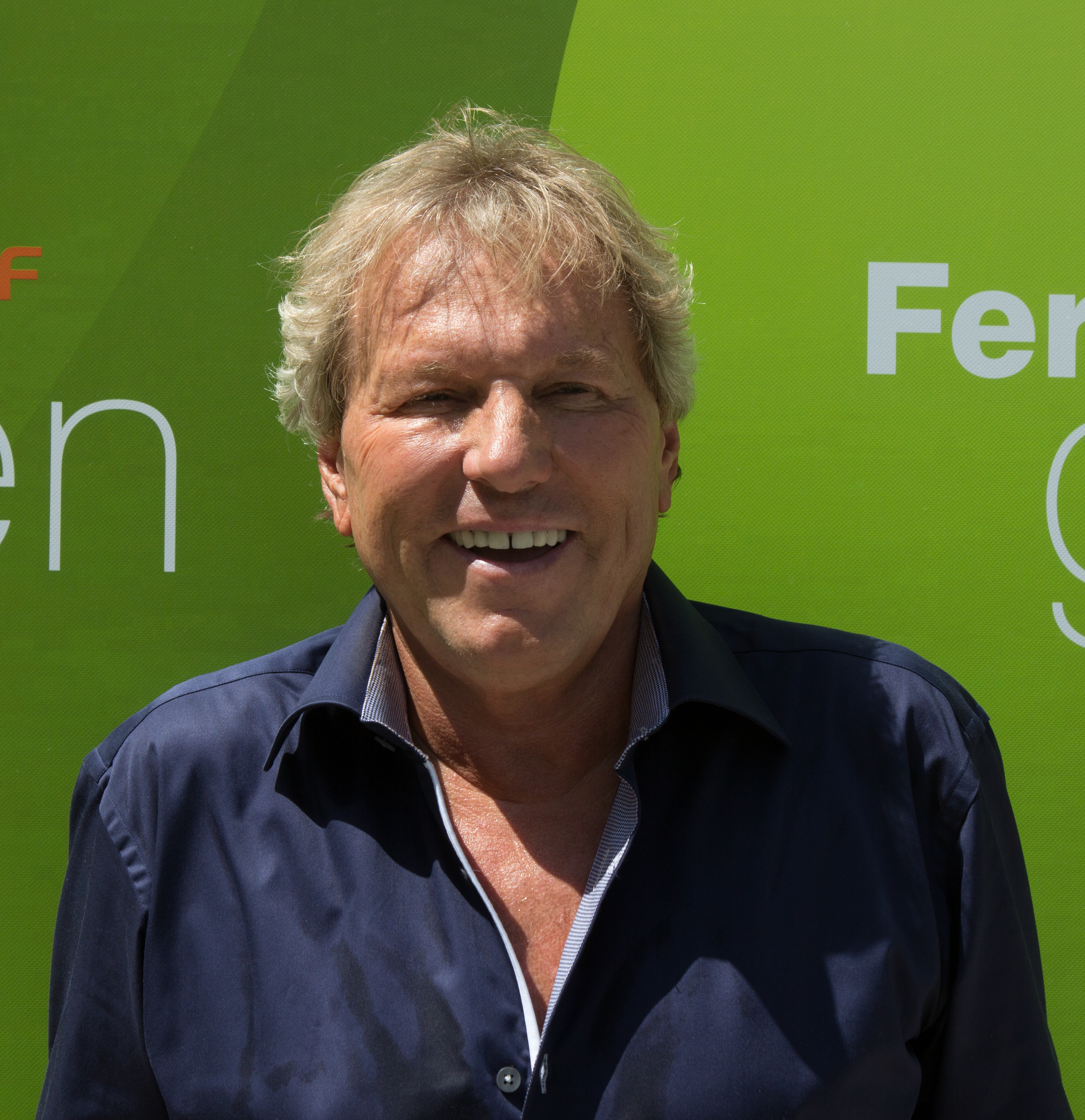
Bernhard Brink, 2018

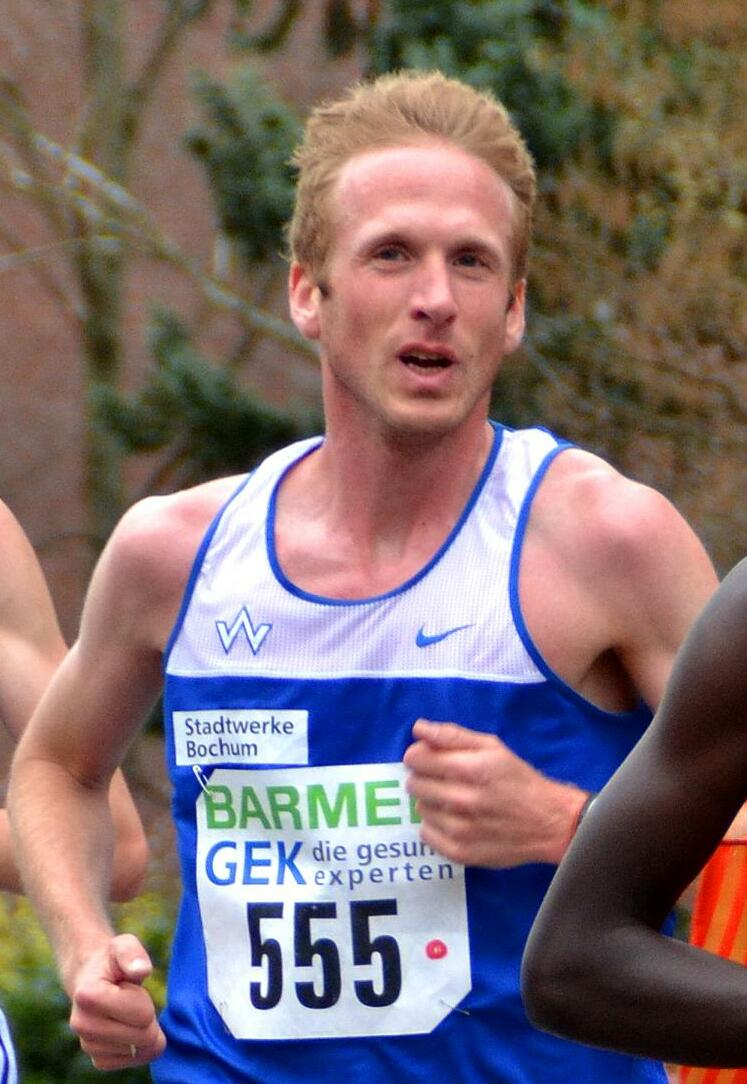
Jan Fitschen, 2013

- Heinrich Barlage (1891–1968), politician
- Siegmund Helms (born 1938), musicologist, music educator and writer
- Bernhard Brink (born 1952), entertainer, musician and schlager singer
- Michael Schneider (born 1953), flautist, recorder player, conductor and academic teacher
- Beate Merk, (DE Wiki) (born 1957), politician (CSU), Bavarian State Justice Minister
- Johnny de Brest, (DE Wiki) (born 1963), artist and photographer
- Andreas Kemper (born 1963), sociologist and author
- Petra Schmidt (born 1963), operatic soprano and academic
- Albert Stegemann (born 1976), politician

=== Sport ===
- Ernst Küppers (1904–1976), swimmer, competed in two Olympics; died locally
- Otto Geisert (1939–2021), football player, played 198 games
- Ernst-Joachim Küppers (1942–2025), swimmer, team silver medallist at the 1964 Summer Olympics
- Silke Pielen (born 1955), swimmer, team bronze medallist at the 1972 Summer Olympics
- Jan Fitschen (born 1977), long-distance runner
- Simon Cziommer (born 1980), football player, played 302 games
- Andrea Berg (born 1981), volleyball player
- Anna-Lena Grönefeld (born 1985), tennis player
- Jennifer Janiska (born 1994), volleyball player, captain of the Germany women's national volleyball team.

== Twin towns – sister cities ==
Nordhorn is twinned with:

- Coevorden, Netherlands (1963)
- Montivilliers, France (1963)
- Reichenbach im Vogtland, Germany (1987)
- Malbork, Poland (1995)
- Rieti, Italy (2010)
