= Neuenhaus (disambiguation) =

Neuenhaus is a town in the district of Grafschaft Bentheim in Lower Saxony, Germany.

Neuenhaus may also refer to:

- Neuenhaus (Samtgemeinde), the collective municipality centred on Neuenhaus, Germany
- Neuenhaus district, Aichtal, Baden-Württemberg, Germany

== See also ==
- Neuenhäusen, a suburb of Celle in Lower Saxony, Germany
- Neunhausen, Wiltz, Diekirch, Luxembourg
