= Osterwald =

- Municipality
- Location of Osterwald within Grafschaft Bentheim district
- Interactive map of Osterwald
- Location within Germany Location within Lower Saxony
- Coordinates: 52°32′3″N 7°1′59″E
- Country: Germany
- State: Lower Saxony
- District: Grafschaft Bentheim
- Municipal assoc.: Neuenhaus

Area
  - Total: 33.38 km^{2} (12.89 sq mi)
- Elevation: 19 m (62 ft)

Population (2025-12-31)
  - Total: 1,141
  - Density: 34.18/km^{2} (88.53/sq mi)
- Time zone: UTC+01:00 (CET)
  - Summer (DST): UTC+02:00 (CEST)
- Postal codes: 49828
- Dialling codes: 05925, 05941, 05944, 05946
- Vehicle registration: NOH

Osterwald is a community and part of the Joint Community (Samtgemeinde) of Neuenhaus in the district of Grafschaft Bentheim in Lower Saxony. The community consists of the centres of Osterwald, Alte Piccardie and Hohenkörben (Veldhausen parish).

In Osterwald are found two brooks: the Soermannsbecke and the Böltbecke, which later empty into the Lee

== Neighbouring communities ==
Osterwald's neighbours are Veldhausen, Neuenhaus, Grasdorf, Georgsdorf, Esche, Hohenkörben and Bimolten.

== History ==
The name Osterwald first crops up in 14th-century documents.

== Politics ==
The mayor is Gerda Brookmann.

== Economy ==
Osterwald's economic mainstay is agriculture, and its next most important source of livelihood is the petroleum industry. Moreover, many smaller businesses are to be found, such as carpenter's shops, a driving school and a shoe shop. Once, the petroleum industry was the community's greatest economic factor. Also built in this time was the swimming pool, whose ceiling fell in; since that time, it has not been used.

== Sport ==
Besides a football field used by BCO n.e.V.(Bolz Club Osterwald), there is also a sport hall, where volleyball, handball, basketball and football are played.

== Population ==
Some of the people among those locally born, mostly older people, still speak Low German.

== Culture ==
In Osterwald there are a petroleum museum and a farming museum. At the village community house, theatre performances or children's musicals share space with weddings and other celebrations.

Furthermore, Osterwald is also a favourite place for people to come and play the regional game known as Kloatscheeten which involves teams rolling a small wooden disk with a leaden core along roadways.
