= Hans Philipp =

German World War II fighter pilot and wing commander

- Philipp as a Hauptmann
- Born: 17 March 1917; Meissen, Kingdom of Saxony, German Empire
- Died: 8 October 1943 (aged 26) near Wielen, Free State of Prussia, Nazi Germany; 52°31′44″N 06°43′08″E
- Cause of death: Killed in action
- Burial place: Trinitatis Cemetery, Meissen
- Military career
- Allegiance: Nazi Germany
- Branch: Luftwaffe
- Service years: 1936–1943
- Rank: Oberstleutnant (lieutenant colonel)
- Nickname: Fips
- Units: JG 76, JG 54, JG 1
- Commands: 4./JG 54, I./JG 54, JG 1
- Conflicts: World War II: Invasion of Poland; Battle of France; Battle of Britain; Balkans Campaign; Operation Barbarossa; Defense of the Reich †
- Awards: Knight's Cross of the Iron Cross with Oak Leaves and Swords

Hans Philipp (17 March 1917 – 8 October 1943) was a German Luftwaffe fighter ace during World War II. A flying ace or fighter ace is a military aviator credited with shooting down five or more enemy aircraft during aerial combat. He is credited with 206 enemy aircraft shot down in over 500 combat missions. The majority of his victories were claimed over the Eastern Front, with 29 claims over the Western Front.

Born in Meissen, (Note: in German orthography: Meißen with a "sharp S"; see ß.) Philipp grew up in the Weimar Republic and Nazi Germany as the only child of a single parent, Alma Philipp. He was raised under challenging financial circumstances, and volunteered for military service in the Wehrmacht in 1936. Following flight training, he was posted to Jagdgeschwader 76 (JG 76—76th Fighter Wing) of the Luftwaffe and participated in the invasion of Poland and as a Staffelkapitän (squadron leader) in the Battle of France. His unit was reformed as II./Jagdgeschwader 54 (JG 54—54th Fighter Wing) in June 1940. (Note: For an explanation of the meaning of Luftwaffe unit designation see Organisation of the Luftwaffe during World War II.) He was awarded the Knight's Cross of the Iron Cross on 22 October 1940 during the Battle of Britain. He then fought in the aerial battles of the Balkans Campaign and Operation Barbarossa, the German invasion of the Soviet Union. He received the Knight's Cross of the Iron Cross with Oak Leaves after 62 aerial victories on 24 August 1941 and the Swords (Schwerter) to his Knight's Cross on 12 March 1942, his score now at 86 aerial victories. He claimed his 100th victory on 31 March 1942, the fourth fighter pilot to achieve this mark, (Note: The first fighter pilot to claim 100 aerial victories in combat was Oberstleutnant Werner Mölders on 15 July 1941, the second was Major Günther Lützow on 24 October 1941 and the third was Major Walter Oesau on 26 October 1941.) and his 150th aerial victory on 14 January 1943. Philipp claimed four aircraft shot down on 17 March 1943 taking his total to 203 aerial victories. He thus surpassed Hermann Graf as the leading German fighter pilot at the time, and six months after Graf, became the second pilot to claim more than 200 victories.

Philipp was promoted to Major (major) and given command as the Geschwaderkommodore (wing commander) of Jagdgeschwader 1 (JG 1—1st Fighter Wing) on 1 April 1943, conducting Defense of the Reich operations against the United States Army Air Forces (USAAF). He was promoted to Oberstleutnant (lieutenant colonel) on 1 October 1943 and was killed in action a week later on 8 October during an attack on Bremen. It is believed that he was shot down by the P-47 Thunderbolt pilot Robert S. Johnson. Philipp managed to bail out but his parachute failed to open.

== Childhood and education ==
Johannes "Hans" Fritz Philipp was born on 17 March 1917 at 22:45 at Gustav-Graf-Straße 5 in Meissen, in the Kingdom of Saxony, part of the German Empire. His mother Alma Philipp was not married. His father was Leopold Gushurst whom his mother had met while serving at the hospital at Meissen-Zaschendorf. Gushurst had studied medicine at the universities in Erlangen (1912–14) and Freiburg (1914–16) and served as battalion doctor with the heavy artillery on the Western and Eastern Fronts of World War I. He attained his doctorate in the field of radiology in April 1920 and opened his medical practice in Plauen. In the 1920s, his social status as a doctor did not allow him to disclose his relationship with the unmarried mother of his child.

Philipp's mother, who never married, was the eighth child of relatively poor parents. Her father made a living as a driver and as a laborer in the construction business. The financial situation was always tight, and taught everyone in the family discipline and to work hard to survive. To support the family, Alma worked as an accountant and clerk. Philipp's father paid a monthly alimony of 35 ℛ︁ℳ︁ until 1933. Initially he had to be reminded by his mother of his obligations. Philipp was baptized on 29 July 1917, taking the name Johannes Fritz, and was confirmed in 1931.

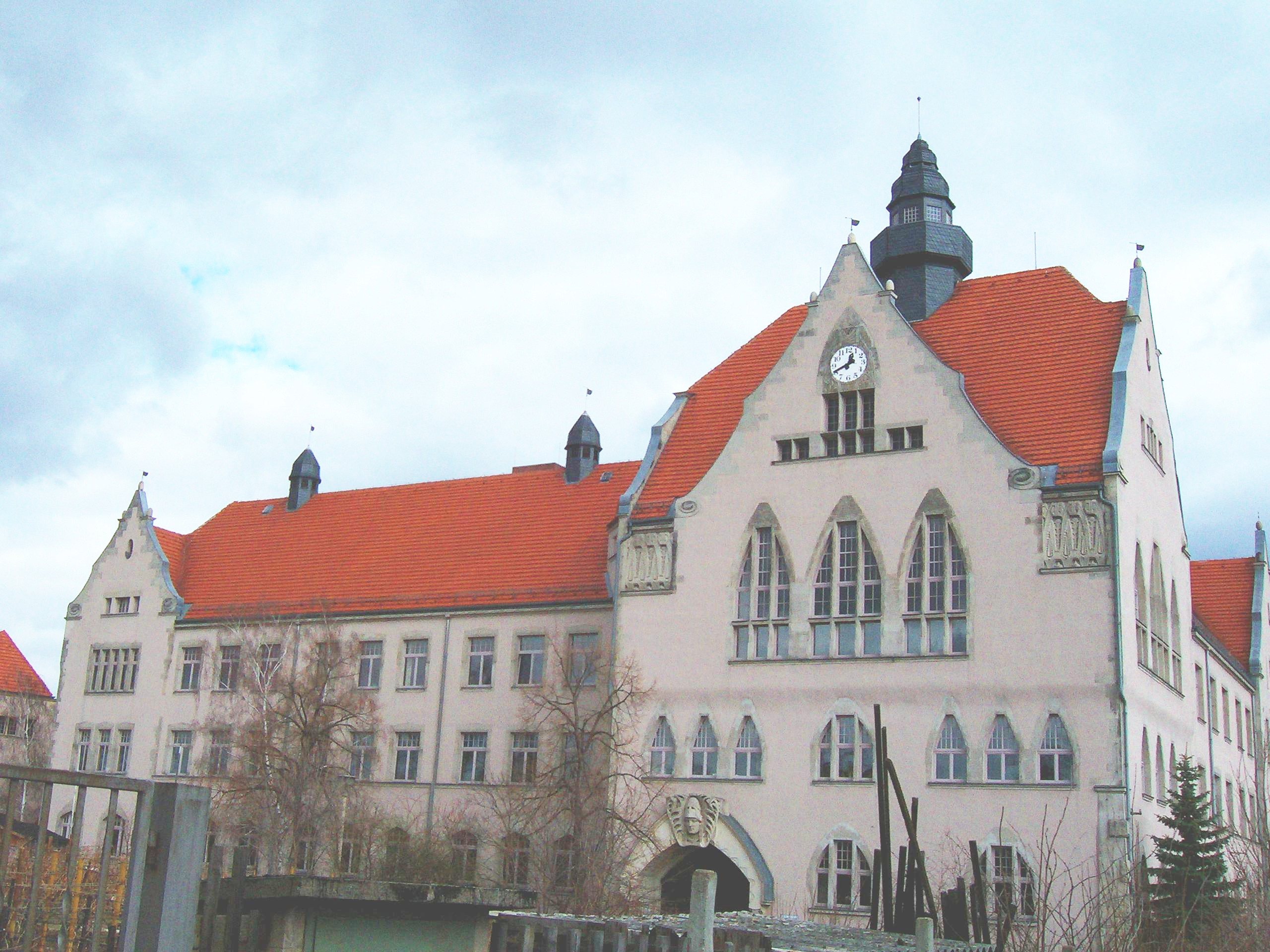
Franziskaneum Meißen in 2007

In 1924, Philipp attended the 4. Volksschule (Pestalozzischule—4th elementary school) in Meissen. Philipp was a very good student. His mother understood that education was essential to Philipp's future. She worked very hard to raise the funds to pay for higher education in order to send Philipp to a Gymnasium (secondary school). In 1927, she managed to have Philipp admitted to the Franziskaneum in Meissen, the Realgymnasium—a secondary school built on the mid-level Realschule to achieve the Abitur (university entry qualification)—in Meissen. Alma, desperate to secure her son's schooling, wrote to the city council of Meissen in 1932 asking if the school fees could be waived.

Philipp participated in various sporting events organized by the Christlicher Verein Junger Männer (CVJM—the German equivalent of YMCA) such as hiking, bicycling, skiing, paddling and rowing. He also was a member of the Hitlerjugend (HJ—Hitler Youth) and received the HJ-Ehrenzeichen (Honor Badge). Philipp learned to fly glider aircraft in the Hitler Youth and received his A and B glider license, leading the local HJ-Fliegerschar (Flying Squad) in Meissen. Adolf Hitler officially re-established the Luftwaffe in March 1935. Following this event, Philipp then changed his mind and decided he did not want to become a journalist. He passed his physical examination to become a pilot, observer, aircraft mechanic and or radio operator on 6 September 1935 in Dresden. The financial situation of the Philipp family was always a cause for concern. When Alma's mother was paralyzed and required nursing care, the financial situation became severe. Alma's monthly income was 225 ℛ︁ℳ︁ and the annual school fee of 180 ℛ︁ℳ︁ was a big burden. She wrote to the city council multiple times asking for the fees to be waived. By early 1935, the family was behind on their payments which had accumulated to a debt of 390 ℛ︁ℳ︁ by 31 March 1935. Philipp's graduation from school was at risk as he was threatened with expulsion on financial grounds. Philipp's decision to opt for military service in the Wehrmacht eased the financial tension. He was permitted to graduate, provided that his mother paid back the debt in instalments of 10 ℛ︁ℳ︁ per month.

== Early career ==
Following his graduation from school, Philipp had to complete his compulsory six months in the Reichsarbeitsdienst (RAD—Reich Labor Service). He began his RAD service on 2 January 1936 in Lager 5/150 (Camp 5/150) in Riesa. He was released early and started his military training as a Fahnenjunker (cadet) on 6 April 1936 at the 2nd Air Warfare School (Luftkriegsschule 2) at Gatow, on the south-western outskirts of Berlin. Among his classmates were Werner Baumbach, who became a bomber pilot, and Helmut Lent, a nightfighter pilot. Philipp, as a member of the 4. Schülerkompanie (4th Student Company), completed Lehrgang I (1st course) by 4 August 1936, Lehrgang II (2nd course) by 31 May 1937, and the final Lehrgang III (3rd course) by 31 August 1937. He received the Pilot's Badge after completing these courses. During this training period he was promoted to Fahnenjunker-Gefreiter (cadet-private) on 1 October 1936, Fahnenjunker-Unteroffizier (cadet-corporal) on 1 December 1936, Fähnrich (ensign) on 1 April 1937 and Oberfähnrich (senior ensign) on 1 December 1937. Philipp was promoted to the officer rank of Leutnant (second lieutenant) on 24 February 1938, with the effective date was backdated to 1 January 1938. His commanding officer released him with the words, "I release you with great concern for your own career, but with even greater concern for the Air Force as a whole"—apparently Philipp had been aware that his promotion was at risk for his opposition to the monotony of the training system. Just prior to his promotion he had started looking for an alternative employment with the Maschinenfabrik Pekrun (machine factory Pekrun) in Coswig, which his dance partner, Margarete Strunz, had helped to arrange.

Philipp was transferred to the I. Gruppe of Kampfgeschwader 253 (I./KG 253—1st group of the 253rd Bomber Wing) on 1 March 1938. (Note: Kampfgeschwader 253 was later re-designated Kampfgeschwader 4 "General Wever" (KG 4—4th Bomber Wing).) This assignment did not suit Philipp, and on 1 May 1938 he managed to get himself transferred to the Jagdfliegerschule Werneuchen (fighter pilot school) in Werneuchen, then under the command of Oberst (Colonel) Theodor Osterkamp. The Anschluß, the 1938 occupation and annexation of Austria into the German Reich, spawned the rapid expansion of the Luftwaffe. Philipp's fighter pilot career benefited from this expansion and he was transferred to the I./Jagdgeschwader 138 (I./JG 138—1st group of the 138th Fighter Wing) stationed in Wien-Schwechat on 1 July 1938. Here he underwent flight conversion training from the Heinkel He 51 biplane to the then modern Messerschmitt Bf 109. This posed challenges, and on 21 June and again 19 July 1939, he damaged his Bf 109 during takeoff and landing. In 1939, Philipp bought a DKW Meisterklasse automobile. With this car he went on a tour through Italy where he met his future fiancée Katharina Egger from South Tyrol. On 1 May 1939, his unit I./JG 138 was re-designated I./Jagdgeschwader 76 (I./JG 76—1st group of the 76th Fighter Wing).

== World War II ==
The German invasion of Poland began on 1 September 1939, and marked the beginning of World War II in Europe. Philipp's unit was tasked with bomber escort and ground attack as well as combat air patrol missions. He was credited with his first aerial victory on 5 September 1939 over a PZL P.24 7 kilometres (4.3 miles) south of Radomsko. Philipp maneuvered himself into a favorable attack position and aimed carefully. Just as he was about to open fire, the enemy pilot bailed out without firing a single shot. Nevertheless, he was given credit for the destruction of the aircraft and was awarded the Iron Cross 2nd Class (Eisernes Kreuz 2. Klasse), which was presented to him on 10 October 1939. He lost his wingman during the Phoney War air skirmishes with the Armée de l'Air (French Air Force) in late November 1939.

Case Yellow (Fall Gelb), the invasion of France and the Low Countries on 10 May 1940, marked the beginning of the Battle of France. Philipp claimed four victories in the early phase of the campaign which earned him the Iron Cross 1st Class (Eisernes Kreuz 1. Klasse) on 31 May 1940. The next day, 1 June, he was promoted to Oberleutnant (first lieutenant). His unit was tasked with bomber escort missions against the British Expeditionary Force in the Battle of Dunkirk and was relocated to airbases in the vicinity of Paris on 3 June. Following the armistice on 22 June I./JG 76 was moved to Eindhoven and Schiphol where they were tasked with the aerial defense of the Netherlands. On 5 July 1940, I./JG 76 was renamed II./Jagdgeschwader 54 (JG 54—54th Fighter Wing), 1./JG 76 became 4./JG 54, and at the same time relocated at Campagne, south of Calais. On 25 August 1940, the Staffelkapitän (squadron leader) of 4. Staffel of JG 54, Oberleutnant Dietrich Hrabak, was appointed Gruppenkommandeur of II./JG 54. In consequence, Philipp was given command of 4./JG 54.

=== Battle of Britain ===
Aerial operations in what would become the Battle of Britain began for his unit on 12 July 1940. The fighting reached a climax on 7 August when Eagle Day was launched (code name Adlertag). Hitler had issued Führer Directive no. 17 (Weisung Nr. 17) on 1 August 1940; the strategic objective was to engage and defeat the Royal Air Force (RAF) to achieve air supremacy, or at least air superiority, in preparation for Operation Sea Lion (Unternehmen Seelöwe), the proposed amphibious invasion of Great Britain. From 7 September onwards, the Luftwaffe switched to attack British towns and cities, with London coming under particularly heavy attack, during what was dubbed The Blitz by the British. In total, Philipp flew 130 missions over England. His number of aerial victories increased, including his 12th to 15th on 27 September, which led to the presentation of the Honor Goblet of the Luftwaffe (Ehrenpokal der Luftwaffe) on 28 September 1940. He claimed his 20th victory on 20 October, and was awarded the Knight's Cross of the Iron Cross (Ritterkreuz des Eisernen Kreuzes). He was the second pilot of JG 54 to receive this award. The first was his Gruppenkommandeur (group commander) Hauptmann Hrabak, who received the award one day earlier.

The German air offensive against England was a failure, and only resulted in heavy losses. To replenish these, II./JG 54 was withdrawn from the Channel Front on 3 December 1940 and stationed at Delmenhorst. The pilots were sent on a ski vacation at Kitzbühl and given home leave. Philipp made a public propaganda appearance at his Franziskaneum home school on 16 December, speaking of his actions as fighter pilot. On 15 January 1941, his unit was moved to Le Mans, southwest of Paris, to protect the airspace over Normandy. Here they stayed until 29 March 1941 when they were ordered to Graz-Thalerhof in preparation for the attack on Yugoslavia.

=== Balkans campaign and Operation Barbarossa ===
The Balkans campaign began on 6 April 1941, with multiple objectives. Operation Marita was the codename for the German invasion of Greece, while JG 54's Stab, II. Gruppe, and III. Gruppe were committed to the invasion of Yugoslavia as part of Fliegerführer Arad. During the early missions, JG 54 engaged the Bf 109s of the Jugoslovensko Kraljevsko Ratno Vazduhoplovstvo (JKRV—Yugoslav Royal Air Force) in numerous air battles. Philipp claimed two JKRV Bf 109s shot down during a Stuka escort mission on the second day of operations on 7 April, taking his total to 25 aerial victories. 4./JG 54 made four claims in total. Philipp's opponents were from 32 Grupa which suffered eight Yugoslav-flown Bf 109s shot down. Five pilots were killed—Captain Miha Klavora, 104 Eskadrila; Second Lieutenant Jovan Kapesic, 103 Eskadrila; Warrant Officer Branislav Todorovic, 103 Eskadrila, Sergeant Vladimir Gorup, 103 Eskadrila and Sergeant Milivoje Boskovic, 104 Eskadrila.

Following the surrender of the Royal Yugoslav Army on 17 April 1941, while stationed at an airfield at Zemun near Belgrade, the Geschwader received orders on 3 May 1941 to turn over all Bf 109-Es so they could receive the new Bf 109-F variant. Transition training was completed at Airfield Stolp-Reitz in Pomerania. Following intensive training, the Geschwader was moved to airfields in Eastern Prussia. On 22 June at 03:05, 120 aircraft of the Geschwader crossed into Soviet airspace in support of Operation Barbarossa, the invasion of the Soviet Union. Philipp, like many other German fighter pilots, enjoyed superiority over his Soviet adversaries in the early phase of Barbarossa, both in terms of the training he had received and the aircraft that he flew. He quickly accumulated further victories and on account of his 31st to 33rd victories achieved on 4 July was mentioned in the Wehrmachtbericht radio report, the first of five such mentions, on 7 July.

Philipp claimed his 62nd victory on 24 August 1941, an achievement which earned him the Knight's Cross of the Iron Cross with Oak Leaves (Ritterkreuz des Eisernen Kreuzes mit Eichenlaub). He was the 33rd member of the German armed forces to be so honored. The presentation was made on 27 August 1941 by Hitler at the Führer Headquarter Wolfsschanze (Wolf's Lair) in Rastenburg (now Kętrzyn in Poland). (Note: Also present at the award ceremony were the fighter pilots Hauptmann (Captain) Hans "Assi" Hahn and Oberleutnant Heinz Bär who were also awarded the Oak Leaves to the Knight's Cross.) Following the loss of Hauptmann Franz Eckerle, who had been reported as missing in action since 14 February 1942, Philipp, who had claimed his 77th victory, was appointed Gruppenkommandeur of I./JG 54 on 17 February 1942. On 23 February, Philipp shot down his 82nd opponent, the 158 IAP's (158th Fighter Aviation Regiment) Leytenant Mikhail Satalkin, who was posted as missing in action. (Note: IAP—Istrebitelny Aviatsionny Polk (Fighter Aviation Regiment—Истребительный Авиационный Полк))

=== Eastern Front ===
Following his 86th victory claimed on 12 March 1942, Philipp became the first member of the Geschwader to receive the Knight's Cross of the Iron Cross with Oak Leaves and Swords (Ritterkreuz des Eisernen Kreuzes mit Eichenlaub mit Schwertern). The Swords had been awarded only seven times before. The presentation on 5 April 1942 was again made by Hitler himself at the Wolfsschanze. (Note: Also present at the ceremony were Hauptmann Kurt Ubben and Oberleutnant Max-Hellmuth Ostermann, who both received the Oak Leaves on this date.) By this date his total had increased further. On 31 March 1942, he became only the fourth Luftwaffe fighter pilot to achieve 100 victories.

Following the presentation of the Swords, Philipp went on home leave. Again he was asked to make a number of propaganda appearances. On 1 May 1942, he spoke before his home school and before the Meissen youth at the Hamburger Hof. He, his mother and his fiancée were also invited to Meissen Town Hall on 30 April. Among other officials, present were the NSDAP-Kreisleiter (county leader) Helmut Böhme and the mayor of Meissen, Walter Kaule. Philipp was granted the privilege of signing the Meissen Guestbook (Goldenes Buch)—a book signed in German communities and cities by special guests of honor.

Philipp returned to the Eastern Front at Krasnogwardejsk south of Leningrad and claimed his 101st to 103rd victories on 6 June 1942, which were mentioned in the Wehrmachtbericht on 7 June. His third mention in the Wehrmachtbericht on 27 June came after he achieved his 108th to 110th victories on 26 June. In addition to the references in the Wehrmachtbericht he received the German Cross in Gold (Deutsches Kreuz in Gold) on 29 June 1942. (Note: According to Patzwall and Scherzer he received the German Cross in Gold on 18 June 1942.) He also received the Croatian Order of the Crown of King Zvonimir (Red krune kralja Zvonimira) 2nd Class with Swords on 15 September 1942 for his work with the Croatian Air Force Legion's fighter unit commanded by Franjo Džal. On 14 January 1943, he claimed his 150th aerial victory. This led to the presentation of the Picture of the Reichsmarschall in Silver Frame (Bild des Reichsmarschalls im Silberrahmen) on 16 February 1943. His unit received the Focke-Wulf Fw 190 in February 1943. He quickly accumulated further victories, and on 17 March 1943, his 26th birthday, he claimed his 200th to 203rd enemy aircraft shot down, recognized by his fourth mention in the Wehrmachtbericht. He was the second pilot after Hermann Graf to achieve this mark, and at the time was the most successful fighter pilot of the Luftwaffe.

=== Wing commander of JG 1 and death ===
In April 1943, Philipp was transferred to Defense of the Reich duties as Geschwaderkommodore (wing commander) of Jagdgeschwader 1 (JG 1—1st Fighter Wing), flying high altitude interception operations against the USAAF Eighth Air Force over the North Sea and northern Germany. He succeeded Oberstleutnant Erich Mix who was transferred. Command of I./JG 54 was temporarily given to Hauptmann Gerhard Koall until Major Reinhard Seiler took command of the Gruppe on 1 May. Philipp claimed his 204th victory on 2 May, and his 205th on 18 May before falling ill with appendicitis. This required hospitalization in Meissen. On 4 October 1943, Reichsmarschall Hermann Göring is said to have issued the following instructions after another attack by the Eighth Air Force.

1. There are no meteorological conditions which would prevent fighters from taking off and engaging in combat.
2. Every fighter pilot returning in a machine not showing any sign of combat, or without having recorded a victory will be prosecuted by a court-martial.
3. In the case of where a pilot uses up his ammunition, or if his weapons are unusable, he should ram the enemy bomber.

Philipp's response was "As far as I'm concerned, I categorically refuse to allow myself to be held to such advice; I know what I have to do!"

Against 20 Russians trying to shoot you down, or even 20 Spitfires, it can be exciting, even fun. But to curve in towards 40 Fortresses and all your past sins flash before your eyes. And when you yourself have reached this state of mind, it becomes that much more difficult to have to drive every pilot of the Geschwader, right down to the youngest and lowliest NCO, to do the same.

— Hans Philipp in a letter to Hannes Trautloft, 4 October 1943

On 8 October 1943, the US Eighth Air Force attacked targets in Bremen and Vegesack with 156 bombers. The bombers were escorted by more than 250 Thunderbolts from six different fighter groups. Phillipp's flight was intercepted by P-47s of the 56th Fighter Group. The Stab Flight of the Geschwader heard Philipp announce a victory over a Thunderbolt. The last transmission from him was, "Reinhardt, attack!", Feldwebel Hans-Günther Reinhardt was Philipp's wingman on this day. He last saw the Kommodore's aircraft disappear in a cloud. Reinhardt was wounded after colliding with an enemy aircraft, but made a successful forced landing. Later that evening, the Geschwader learned that their Geschwaderkommodore had been shot down and killed in his Fw 190 A-6 "Red 6" (Werknummer 530407—factory number).

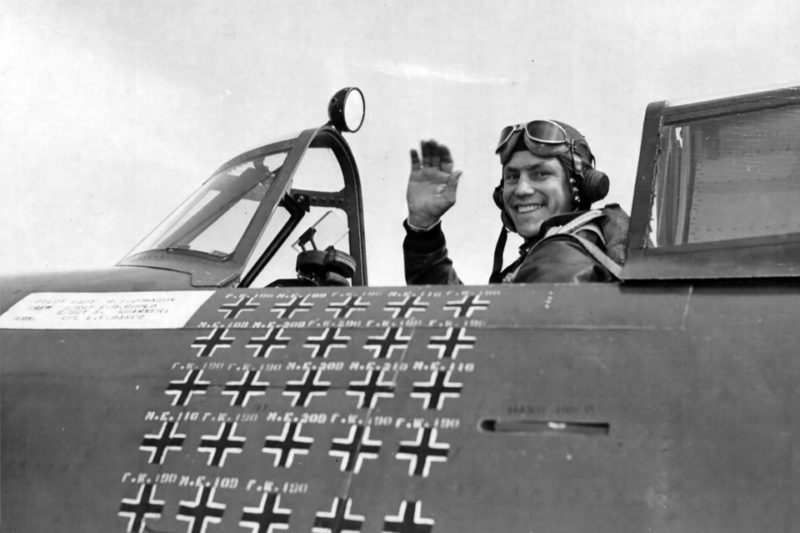
Robert S. Johnson in his P-47 Thunderbolt, 13 April 1944.

The report filed by Reinhardt on 10 October 1943 stated that he and Philipp had taken off at 14:11 on a mission against enemy bombers in the vicinity of Bremen. The group led by Y-Verfahren (Y-Control) had sighted a formation of about 30 Boeing B-17 Flying Fortresses southwest of Bremen at 15:12. The bombers had already completed their bomb run and were returning to England. Philipp started his attack from the right, driving the attack to pointblank range, flaming one of the B-17s which crashed at 15:32. Philipp then flew under the formation to the left when he was hit from the defensive fire of a rear gunner on one of the B-17s which was lagging behind. Philipp then went into a dive and Rheinhardt asked by radio "what has happened?" His response was "Reinhardt, attack". Reinhardt, who had seen that Philipp had been hit, followed Philipp down until he disappeared in a lower cloud layer. More recent research has suggested that Philipp may also have been hit by a P-47 "Thunderbolt" piloted by Robert S. Johnson of the 61st Fighter Squadron. Philipp tried to return to his airfield, but was forced to bail out at low altitude at 15:45 between Hardenberg and Itterbeck, near Wielen (52°31′44″N 06°43′08″E). His parachute failed to open and the jump from an altitude of about 50 meters (160 ft) mortally wounded him. His body was recovered and examined in the field hospital in Rheine the next day. The post mortem examination revealed extensive burns, particularly to the face, a laceration on the back of his head, multiple broken bones and flesh wounds as well as a particularly deep injury to his upper abdomen and inner organs.

From Rheine, on 10 October 1943 Philipp's body was transported to Meissen by train where it arrived the next day. The Wehrmachtbericht announced his death on 12 October. The funeral at the Trinitatisfriedhof (Trinitatis Cemetery) in Meissen, on 14 October 1943, was dominated by military, public and Nazi officials. His coffin, which was draped in the national flag of Nazi Germany along with his honors and decorations on a velvet cushion, was put on display on the entry steps of the town hall in Meissen. Present at the funeral along with his mother, his fiancée and other members of the family, were Oberstleutnant Hannes Trautloft and Generaloberst Alfred Keller, who delivered the eulogy. Philipp's mother died on 7 May 1973, her urn was buried next to her son.

== Summary of career ==
=== Aerial victory claims ===
According to US historian David T. Zabecki, Philipp was credited with 206 aerial victories. Spick also lists him with the same number of aerial victories claimed in an unknown number of combat missions. Mathews and Foreman, authors of Luftwaffe Aces — Biographies and Victory Claims, researched the German Federal Archives and found records for 193 aerial victory claims, plus nine further unconfirmed claims. This figure includes 171 claims on the Eastern Front, two during the Balkan Campaign, and 20 claims on the Western Front, including one four-engined bomber. Prien, Stemmer, Rodeike and Bock list 206 aerial victory claims plus one further unconfirmed claim. This number includes up to two further unconfirmed claims on 31 March 1942.

=== Awards ===
- Wound Badge in Black
- Front Flying Clasp of the Luftwaffe for Fighter Pilots
  - in Gold (19 May 1941)
  - with Pennant (4 October 1942) (Note: According to Berger with Pennant "500".)
- Combined Pilots-Observation Badge
- Honor Goblet of the Luftwaffe on 28 September 1940
- Iron Cross (1939)
  - 2nd Class (10 October 1939)
  - 1st Class (31 May 1940)
- German Cross in Gold on 18 June 1942 as Hauptmann in the II./Jagdgeschwader 54
- Eastern Front Medal (8 August 1942)
- Croatian Order of the Crown of King Zvonimir 2nd Class with Swords (15 September 1942)
- Knight's Cross of the Iron Cross with Oak Leaves and Swords
  - Knight's Cross on 22 October 1940 Oberleutnant and Staffelkapitän of the 4./Jagdgeschwader 54
  - 33rd Oak Leaves on 24 August 1941 as Oberleutnant and Staffelkapitän of the 4./Jagdgeschwader 54
  - 8th Swords on 12 March 1942 Hauptmann and Gruppenkommandeur of the I./Jagdgeschwader 54
- Five named references in the Wehrmachtbericht on (7 July 1941, 7 June 1942, 27 June 1942, 18 March 1943 and 12 October 1943)

=== Dates of rank ===
6 April 1936:	Fahnenjunker
1 October 1936:	Fahnenjunker-Gefreiter
1 December 1936:	Fahnenjunker-Unteroffizier
1 April 1937:	Fähnrich
1 December 1937:	Oberfähnrich
1 January 1938:	Leutnant (Second Lieutenant)
1 June 1940:	Oberleutnant (First Lieutenant)
18 November 1941:	Hauptmann (Captain)
March 1943:	Major (Major)
1 October 1943:	Oberstleutnant (Lieutenant Colonel)

== Notes ==
Military offices
Preceded by Oberstleutnant Erich Mix	Commander of Jagdgeschwader 1 Oesau; 1 April 1943 – 8 October 1943	Succeeded by Major Hermann Graf
