= Esche, Lower Saxony =

Esche
- Municipality
- Location of Esche within Grafschaft Bentheim district
- Interactive map of Esche
- Location within Germany Location within Lower Saxony
- Coordinates: 52°31′59″N 06°58′00″E
- Country: Germany
- State: Lower Saxony
- District: Grafschaft Bentheim
- Municipal assoc.: Neuenhaus

Area
  - Total: 11 km^{2} (4.2 sq mi)
- Elevation: 17 m (56 ft)

Population (2025-12-31)
  - Total: 616
  - Density: 56/km^{2} (150/sq mi)
- Time zone: UTC+01:00 (CET)
  - Summer (DST): UTC+02:00 (CEST)
- Postal codes: 49828
- Dialling codes: 0 59 41
- Vehicle registration: NOH

Esche (German pronunciation: [ˈɛʃə]) is a community in the district of Grafschaft Bentheim in Lower Saxony.

== Geography ==
=== Location ===
Esche lies on the Vechte between Nordhorn and Emlichheim. It belongs to the Joint Community (Samtgemeinde) of Neuenhaus, whose administrative seat is in the like-named town.

=== Services ===
Esche currently has an internet connectivity of 384 kilobit per second which is relatively low compared to the surrounding areas where there are speeds of 16 megabit per second and upward.

Also there is a kindergarten in Esche.

== Politics ==
=== Mayor ===
The honorary mayor Hermann Berends was elected on 9 September 2001.

=== Regular events ===
The sport club holds its folk festival in mid-April.

== History ==
The community’s namesake was the Haus Esche, also known as Oedinghof. The Haus Esche and the Schulenburg (castle) in Veldhausen were both owned by a family named van Münster.

In the Dutch War of Independence, in 1593, when the Spaniards unsuccessfully laid siege to the fort at Coevorden, the inhabitants of the Esche farming community sought shelter in this house, albeit only for a short time. The dearth of food and lack of room gave rise to a plague outbreak which daily killed many. The survivors were evicted, whereupon they had their goods stolen and were wretchedly mistreated. Today, the community of Esche is a modern residential community, but still with a strong rural character.
