= Lage, Lower Saxony =

Lage
- Municipality
- Location of Lage within Grafschaft Bentheim district
- Interactive map of Lage
- Location within Germany Location within Lower Saxony
- Coordinates: 52°28′02″N 06°57′37″E
- Country: Germany
- State: Lower Saxony
- District: Grafschaft Bentheim
- Municipal assoc.: Neuenhaus

Government
  - Mayor: Henni Nyhuis

Area
  - Total: 6.39 km^{2} (2.47 sq mi)
- Elevation: 19 m (62 ft)

Population (2025-12-31)
  - Total: 1,095
  - Density: 171/km^{2} (444/sq mi)
- Time zone: UTC+01:00 (CET)
  - Summer (DST): UTC+02:00 (CEST)
- Postal codes: 49828
- Dialling codes: 0 59 41
- Vehicle registration: NOH
- Website: www.herrlichkeit-lage.de

Lage (German pronunciation: [ˈlaːɡə]) is a community on the river Dinkel in the district of Grafschaft Bentheim in Lower Saxony with roughly 1,000 inhabitants. It belongs to the Joint Community (Samtgemeinde) of Neuenhaus.

Of particular sightseeing interest are the church, built in 1687, the watermill, built in 1270, the castle ruins (first mentioned in a document in 1183, destroyed in 1324–1326 and 1626), the lordly manor, built in 1686 and the historic Oak Avenue with the manor staff’s old houses.

The extended name Herrlichkeit Lage – “Herrlichkeit” means grandness or magnificence – refers to the time between the end of the Thirty Years' War and the year 1803, in which Lage was a self-standing small state with its own jurisdiction.

The biggest club is the sport club, Rot-Weiß Lage 29 e. V. (about 700 members).

== Castle ==
In 1183 came the first documentary mention of the castle at Lage, and of a Hermann von Lage, who between 1173 and 1183 was Capitular at Münster. Between 1324 and 1326, the castle came to be destroyed during the Guelders Feud under Bishop Ludwig of Münster.

From 1329 to 1330, Bishop Johann of Utrecht built the castle anew for his ally Hermann von Lage, who in 1346 sold the bishop “dat huys toe Lage” (“the house at Lage”), although it remained in von Lage’s hands because the purchase price was not fully paid. In 1380, Bishop Florenz of Utrecht raided Lage Castle, leading to much of it being destroyed. Between 1439 and 1447, it was once again built anew, this time by Bishop Rudolf of Utrecht. Lage was at this time an episcopal seat occupied by a steward, and now and then it was lent out as a pledge.

In 1523 the castle came under fire by Guelders troops, to whom the castle was given up. In 1592, there was yet more building, and there arose a fortlike castle with a house chapel, built by the liege lord Dietrich von Ketteler to whom the castle had been pledged in 1576 and enfeoffed in 1590, whereafter Lage, along with the Bishopric of Utrecht, was transferred to Emperor Charles V, and then from him to his son Philip II of Spain in 1555. In 1626, the Renaissance castle was besieged in the Eighty Years' War by the Dutch, and since then it has lain in ruins.

== Lordly manor ==
The manor was built in 1686 by Amadea von Raesfeld née von Vlodrup as a widow’s seat in classicist Dutch style. In 1762, the eastward side wing was built onto it.

== Watermill ==
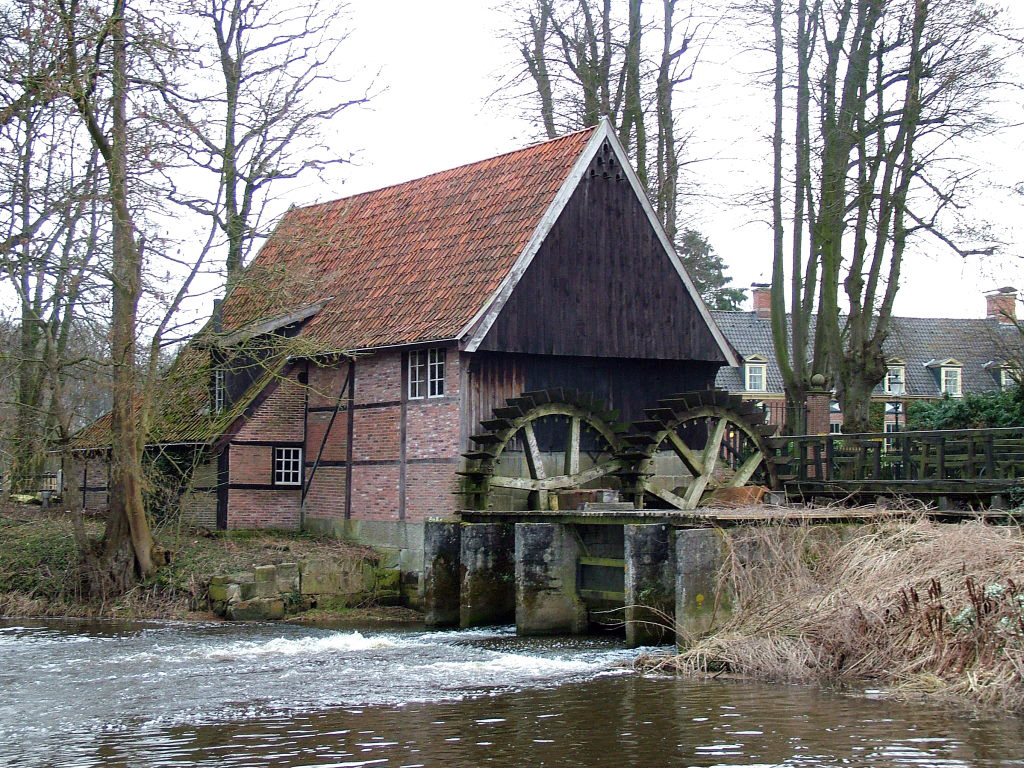
The watermill in Lage

The watermill in Lage an der Dinkel was first mentioned in a document in 1270, and likewise a garnishment document from 1377 speaks of a mill in Lage. It was only about 200 years later, however, that approval was given by then King Philip II of Spain, as ruler of the Netherlands, to build a mill on the river Dinkel. It is supposed that this was a reconstruction or expansion of an existing mill, but what it was precisely is not known.

As it appears today, the mill looks as though it is from the late 17th century. A distinguishing feature is the two undershot waterwheels that drive both a grist mill and an oil mill. In the early years of the 20th century, electricity was also generated at the mill to supply the local community. After the First World War, the oil mill was shut down. The grist mill kept running until 1957, although as of 1931 it had no longer been driven by water power, but rather by a diesel engine. After the last miller’s death, the mill stood empty.

When the building was threatening to fall down, the most urgent safety work was begun in 1962. Ten years later, the district of Grafschaft Bentheim brought about a comprehensive restoration on the mill, giving it once more its two waterwheels, as well as undoing building work that had been done on the river itself in the 1930s and restoring the weir to improve flow rates. In the years up until 1976, the milling machinery was overhauled so that today, on selected days, the mill can now be run again. In the former miller’s dwelling, a tea parlour was set up after the restoration.

== Church ==
On 11 June 1687, Amadea von Raesfeld laid the foundation stone for the building of a church in Lage.
