= Matthis Harsman =

German footballer (born 1999)

Personal information
- Date of birth: 8 October 1999 (age 27)
- Place of birth: Wilsum, Germany
- Height: 1.90 m (6 ft 3 in)
- Position: Goalkeeper

Team information
- Current team: Preußen Münster
- Number: 38

Youth career
- –2015: ASC Grün-Weiß 49
- 2015–2018: SV Meppen

Senior career*
Years	Team	Apps	(Gls)
2018–2023	SV Meppen	26	(0)
2023–2026	SV Rödinghausen	50	(0)
2026–	Preußen Münster	0	(0)
- * Club domestic league appearances and goals as of 31 May 2026

Matthis Harsman (born 4 October 1999) is a German professional footballer who plays as a goalkeeper for 3. Liga club Preußen Münster.

== Career ==
After his career beginnings in the youth department of ASC Grün-Weiß 49 in Wielen, Harsman moved to the academy of SV Meppen in summer 2015. There he was promoted to the first team of the Meppen-based club, competing in the 3. Liga, at the beginning of the 2018–19 season.

On 26 October 2019, he made his professional debut in the 3–3 away draw against Hallescher FC when he came on for Willi Evseev in the 42nd minute of the game, as regular goalkeeper Erik Domaschke had been sent off.
