= Smidt =

Smidt is a surname. In many cases, it is a spelling variation of the German surname Schmidt, originated from Plattdeutsch language Frisian. Notable people with the surname include:

- Eric Smidt (born 1960), American businessman
- Heinrich Smidt (1798–1867), German writer
- Hendrik Jan Smidt (1831–1917), Dutch politician
- J. H. Smidt van Gelder (1887–1969), Dutch pediatrician and art collector
- Johann Smidt (1773–1857), German politician and theologian
- Johannes Smidt (1887–1973), Norwegian theologian and priest
- Karl Smidt (1903–1984), German naval commander
- Karoline Smidt Nielsen (born 1994), Danish footballer
- Kristian Smidt (1916–2013), Norwegian literary historian
- Mathias Bay-Smidt (born 1996), Danish badminton player
- Orville Smidt (1943–2025), American politician
- Rupert de Smidt (1883–1986), South African cricketer
- Steen Smidt-Jensen (born 1945), Danish athlete
- Wolbert Klaus Smidt (1936–2016), German secret service official, diplomat and publicist
