= Ringe, Germany =

Ringe
- Municipality
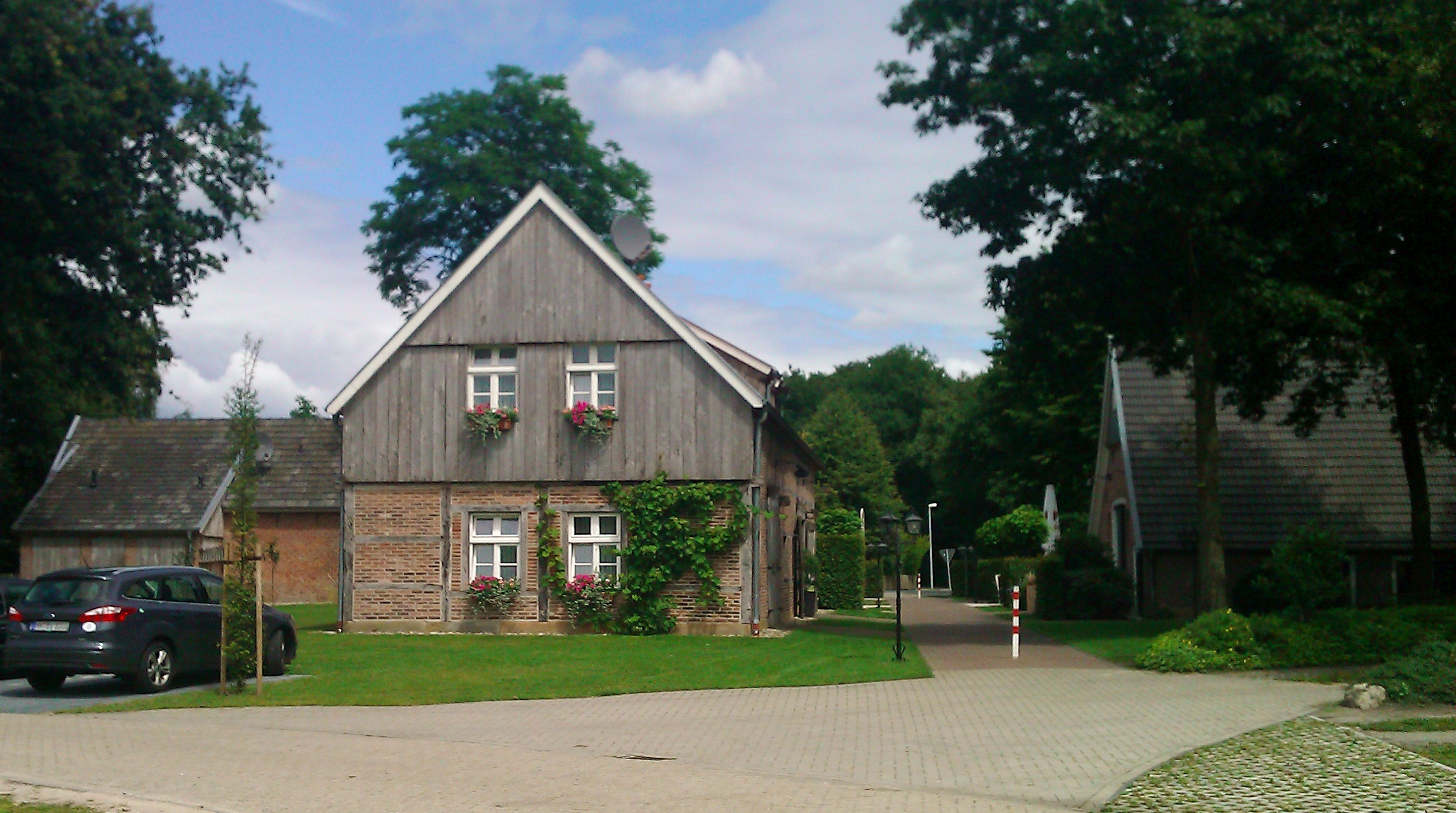
- Buildings of "Altes Landhaus Buddenberg"

- Location of Ringe within Grafschaft Bentheim district
- Interactive map of Ringe
- Location within Germany Location within Lower Saxony
- Coordinates: 52°35′N 6°56′E
- Country: Germany
- State: Lower Saxony
- District: Grafschaft Bentheim
- Municipal assoc.: Emlichheim
- Subdivisions: 3 Ortsteile

Government
  - Mayor: Jan Wilhelm Pol (CDU)

Area
  - Total: 35.36 km^{2} (13.65 sq mi)
- Elevation: 15 m (49 ft)

Population (2025-12-31)
  - Total: 1,938
  - Density: 54.81/km^{2} (142.0/sq mi)
- Time zone: UTC+01:00 (CET)
  - Summer (DST): UTC+02:00 (CEST)
- Postal codes: 49824
- Dialling codes: 05944/ 05943
- Vehicle registration: NOH

Ringe (German pronunciation: [ˈʁɪŋə]) is a community in the district of Grafschaft Bentheim in Lower Saxony, Germany.

== Emlichheim ==
Ringe has roughly 2,000 inhabitants and belongs to the Joint Community (Samtgemeinde) of Emlichheim. The community consists of the three centres of Großringe, Kleinringe and Neugnadenfeld and is mainly characterized by agriculture, although it also has an interesting history behind it. The community's geography was once moorland, but this was cultivated by prisoners of war in the Second World War, for which the Nazis built a special camp, the Lager Alexisdorf. After the war, homeless refugees found housing here, converting the camp into a new settlement, called Neugnadenfeld, now one of Ringe's three centres (Ortsteile).

== The moors ==
Today, there is no longer much in the way of pure moorland in the community, but conservationists have been trying for a few years to recultivate these as the moors, a habitat for some threatened animal species, are becoming scarcer.

== History ==
The community also has a building steeped in history, the Altes Landhaus Buddenberg. This nowadays houses a restaurant and guest rooms. In the house's more than 200-year history, it was mainly home to an inn and a grocer's shop for the rural population. In 1997, after the house had been being used as a private home, it burnt down. A few years later, through help from donations and local history enthusiasts, the house was built anew and lovingly restored as required for preserving historic monuments.

== Geography ==
Through the community of Ringe flows the river Vechte, which downstream, at Laar, crosses the border into the Netherlands.

== Economy ==
The community's economic mainstay is still to a great extent agriculture. However, some service businesses and plastics-processing businesses have also set up shop in town.
