= Service-oriented government =

- Initiator: Ernst Forsthoff
- Introduced: 1938

Service-oriented government
- Traditional Chinese: 服務型政府
- Simplified Chinese: 服务型政府
Transcriptions
Standard Mandarin
- Hanyu Pinyin: Fúwùxíng zhèngfǔ

The service-oriented government (SOG; simplified Chinese: 服务型政府; traditional Chinese: 服務型政府), or service-type government, refers to a government that is guided by the concept of citizen-centered and society-centered, and is formed through legal procedures and in accordance with the will of the citizens within the framework of the democratic order of the whole society, with the purpose of serving the citizens and assuming the responsibility of service. In short, it denotes a government that operates as a service provider. It is a fundamental transformation of the model of traditional regulation-oriented government. The idea behind this conception is consistent with the idea behind New Public Management.

Developed by analogy with service-oriented enterprise (SOE), the concept of "service-oriented government" was initially put forward in 1938 by German administrative law scholar Ernst Forsthoff. However, there is also a view that the term originated in the 1990s and was first introduced and put into practice by local governments and academics in Mainland China.
