= Constantin Frommann =

German footballer (born 1998)

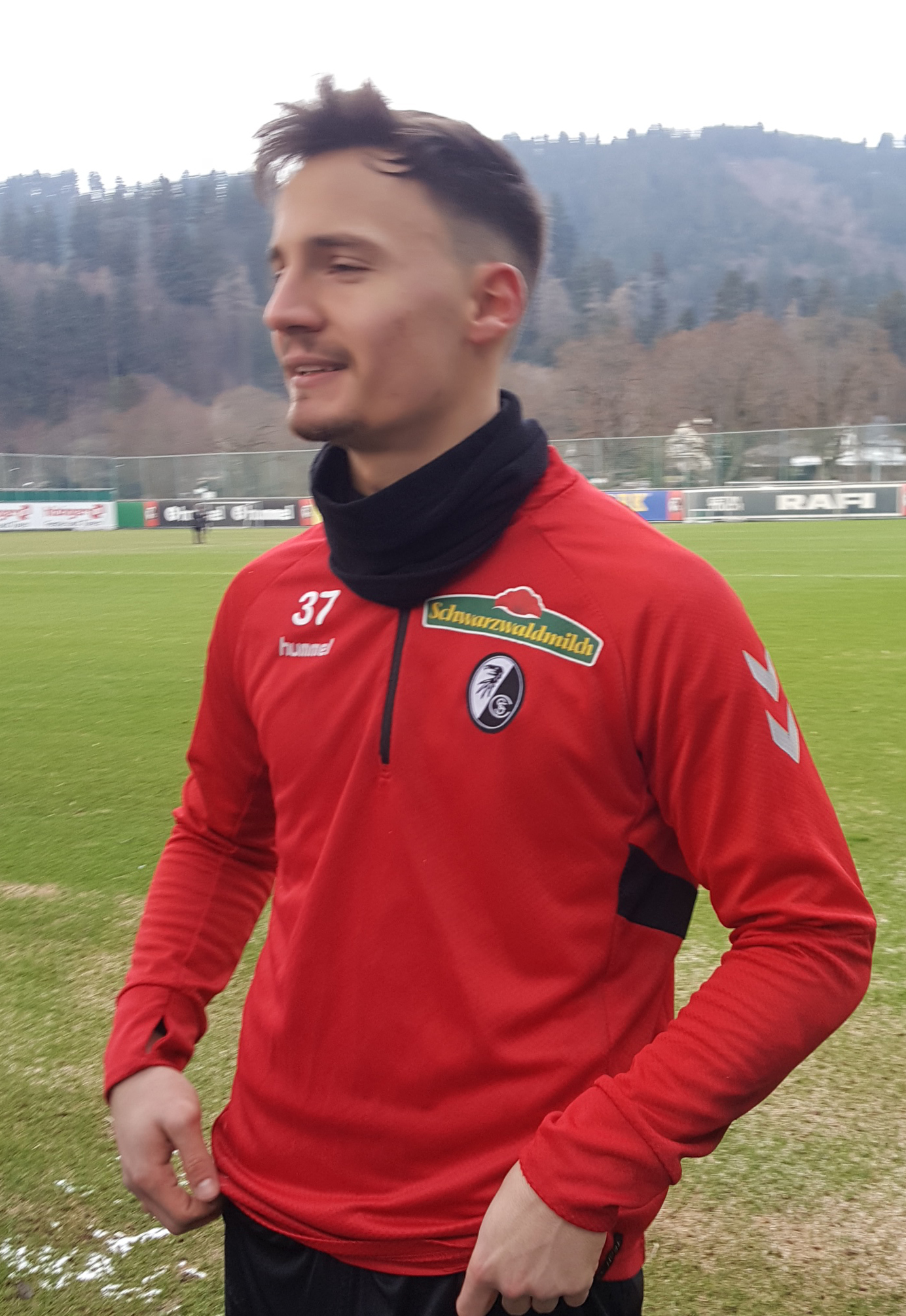
- Frommann with SC Freiburg in 2019

Personal information
- Date of birth: 27 May 1998 (age 28)
- Place of birth: Achern, Germany
- Height: 1.85 m (6 ft 1 in)
- Position: Goalkeeper

Youth career
- 2002–2010: SV Oberachern
- 2010–2016: SC Freiburg

Senior career*
Years	Team	Apps	(Gls)
2016–2019	SC Freiburg II	38	(0)
2018–2020	SC Freiburg	0	(0)
2019–2020	→ Sonnenhof Großaspach (loan)	8	(0)
2020–2022	SV Meppen	2	(0)
Total		48	(0)

International career
2013–2014	Germany U16	2	(0)
2014–2015	Germany U17	18	(0)
2016	Germany U18	1	(0)
2017–2018	Germany U20	3	(0)
Medal record
Representing Germany
UEFA European Under-17 Championship
Runner-up	Bulgaria 2015	U-17 Team
- * Club domestic league appearances and goals

Constantin Frommann (born 27 May 1998) is a German former professional footballer who played as a goalkeeper. He has represented Germany at the under 16, under U17, under U18 and the under 20 level.

== Club career ==
=== SC Freiburg ===
At the age of twelve, Frommann moved from his home club SV Oberachern to the youth academy of SC Freiburg. In 2017, he made his debut in the Regionalliga Südwest for SC Freiburg II, the reserve team of Freiburg, with whom he had previously enjoyed promotion from the Oberliga Baden-Württemberg without making any appearances. In the 2018–19 season, Frommann was part of the professional first team squad of SC Freiburg.

==== Loan to Sonnenhof Großaspach ====
For the 2019–20 season, the goalkeeper was sent on loan to 3. Liga club SG Sonnenhof Großaspach. On the matchday 8, Frommann was given preference over regular goalkeeper Maximilian Reule in a match against Bayern Munich II and made his debut in professional football. The rest of the season, he was mostly a backup to Reule, as Sonnenhof Großaspach suffered relegation by finishing in the penultimate spot in the league table. Upon his return to Freiburg, he was not a part of the club's future plans, and in early October 2020 his contract was terminated shortly before the transfer window was closed. At the same time, he received the offer to continue training with Freiburg until he found a new club.

=== SV Meppen ===
In November 2020, Frommann signed a contract with 3. Liga club SV Meppen, valid until the summer of 2022, after regular keepers Luca Plogmann and Matthis Harsman had suffered injuries. In May 2022, it was announced that his expiring contract would not be extended, making him a free agent after the season.

== After football ==
In January 2023, Frommann announced his retirement from football on medical advice due to persistent and irreparable hip problems.

Following his retirement, Frommann co-founded FUTURE GOAL alongside football coach and bank clerk Sven Oliver Gercke. The company aims to assist professional athletes in transitioning smoothly into life after their active careers.

== International career ==
On 12 November 2013, Frommann made his debut for the Germany national under-16 team. Since then, he played in all of the German Football Association national youth teams up to the U20. At the 2015 UEFA European Under-17 Championship, he started in the final (1–4 loss to France) and was elected to the team of the tournament. For his achievements, he was also awarded the bronze U-17 Fritz Walter Medal.

== Honours ==
Germany U17

- UEFA European Under-17 Championship runner-up: 2015

Individual

- Fritz Walter Medal U17 Bronze: 2015
- 2015 UEFA European Under-17 Championship Team of the Tournament
