= Smidts =

Smidts is a surname. Notable people with the surname include:

- Ale Smidts (born 1958), Dutch organizational theorist
- Carol Smidts, Belgian-American nuclear reliability engineer
- Rudi Smidts (born 1963), Belgian football defender

== See also ==
- Smidt
