= Roland Riese =

German politician (born 1960)

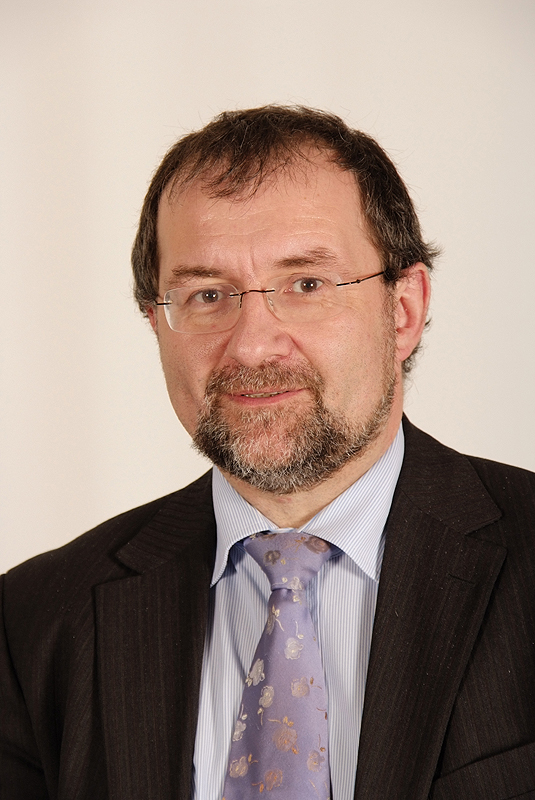
Roland Riese im November 2009

Roland Riese (born 29 July 1960 in Neuenhaus, Lower Saxony) is a German politician that belongs to the Free Democratic Party.

He was elected to the Lower Saxon Landtag in 2003, and has been re-elected on one occasion.

Riese holds a master's degree in Business administration from the University of West Florida. He is member of the Beta Gamma Sigma Society.
