= Halle, Bentheim =

Halle
- Municipality
- Location of Halle within Grafschaft Bentheim district
- Interactive map of Halle
- Location within Germany Location within Lower Saxony
- Coordinates: 52°27′N 6°55′E
- Country: Germany
- State: Lower Saxony
- District: Grafschaft Bentheim
- Municipal assoc.: Uelsen
- Subdivisions: 3 Ortsteile

Government
  - Mayor: Geert Beckhuis

Area
  - Total: 21.15 km^{2} (8.17 sq mi)
- Elevation: 28 m (92 ft)

Population (2025-12-31)
  - Total: 653
  - Density: 30.9/km^{2} (80.0/sq mi)
- Time zone: UTC+01:00 (CET)
  - Summer (DST): UTC+02:00 (CEST)
- Postal codes: 49843
- Dialling codes: 05941
- Vehicle registration: NOH
- Website: www.uelsen.de

Halle (German pronunciation: [ˈhalə]) is a village in the Joint Community (Samtgemeinde) of Uelsen, in the district of Grafschaft Bentheim in Lower Saxony.

The community, to which the centres of Hardingen (amalgamated in 1974) and Hesingen also belong, has 654 inhabitants (as of June 2005) and spans 21.15 km^{2}.

The community’s mayor is Geert Beckhuis.

The Poascheberg in Hesingen is, with an elevation of 89 m above sea level, the highest point in the lower part of the old County of Bentheim.

Unlike the people of the better known and bigger city of Halle in Saxony-Anhalt, who call themselves Hallenser in German, the inhabitants here call themselves simply Haller, following the usual German rule for formulating nouns denoting a particular place’s inhabitants.

Further centres are Belthoek, Bovenhoek, Dalenhoek, Erstenhoek and Kleihoek.
