= Emlichheim =

- Municipality
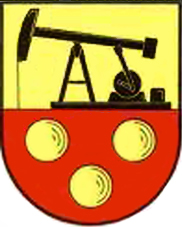
- Flag Coat of arms

- Location of Emlichheim within Grafschaft Bentheim district
- Interactive map of Emlichheim
- Location within Germany Location within Lower Saxony
- Coordinates: 52°37′N 6°50′E
- Country: Germany
- State: Lower Saxony
- District: Grafschaft Bentheim
- Municipal assoc.: Emlichheim

Government
  - Mayor: Arne Jan Helmweg (CDU)

Area
  - Total: 48.65 km^{2} (18.78 sq mi)
- Elevation: 14 m (46 ft)

Population (2025-12-31)
  - Total: 7,744
  - Density: 159.2/km^{2} (412.3/sq mi)
- Time zone: UTC+01:00 (CET)
  - Summer (DST): UTC+02:00 (CEST)
- Postal codes: 49824
- Dialling codes: 0 59 43
- Vehicle registration: NOH
- Website: www.emlichheim.de

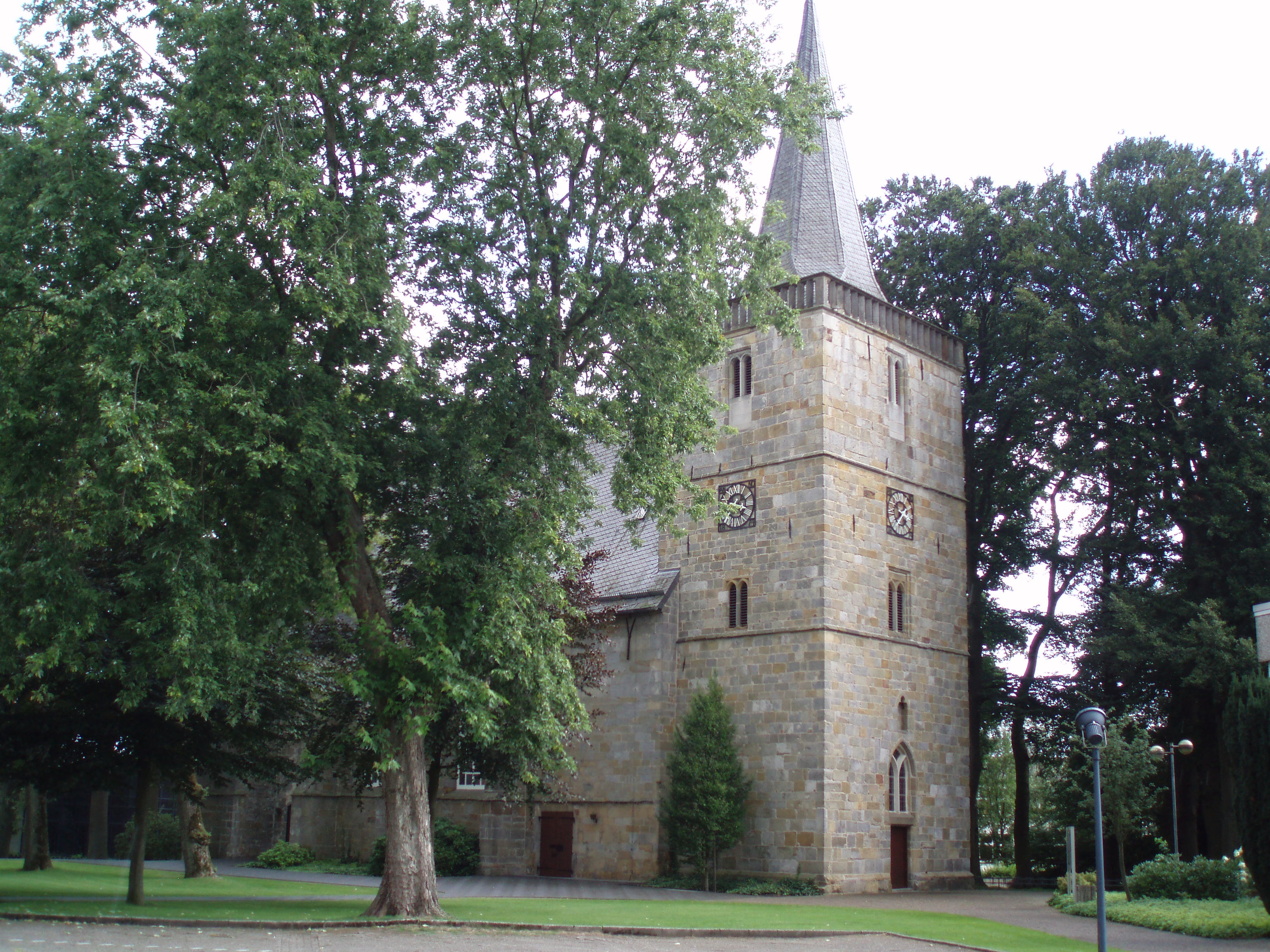
Reformed Church from 1150

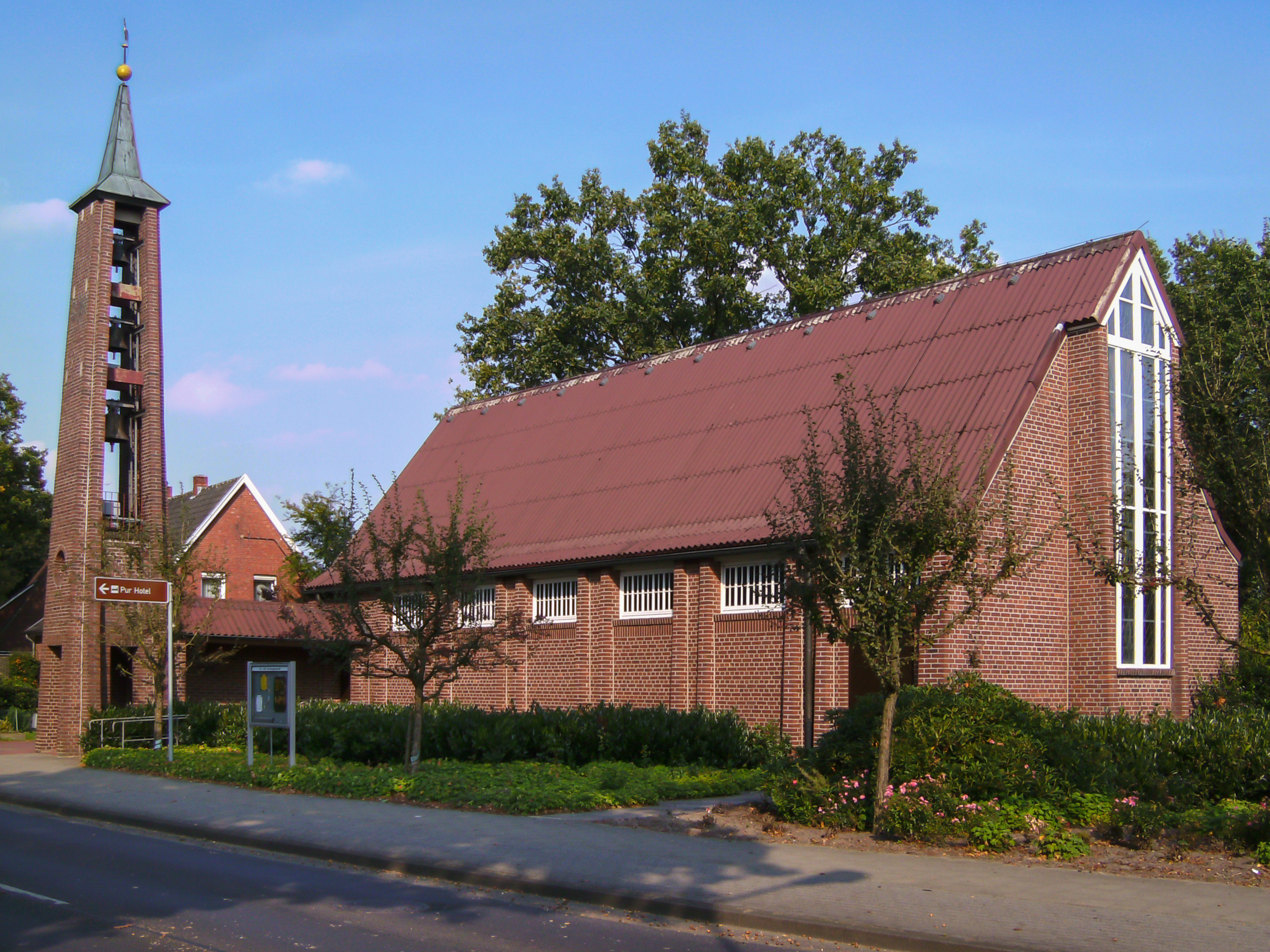
Emlichheim, Lutheran Church of Peace

Emlichheim (German pronunciation: [ˈɛmlɪçˌhaɪm]; Low German: Emmelkamp) is a municipality in the district of Grafschaft Bentheim in Lower Saxony, Germany, roughly 20 km south of Emmen, and 25 km northwest of Nordhorn.

== Geography ==
Emlichheim lies right on the German-Dutch border. The community is bordered on the south by the river Vechte and on the north by the Coevorden-Picardy Canal. It is the administrative seat of the Samtgemeinde Emlichheim, whose members also include Hoogstede, Laar and Ringe. The village has experienced massive growth due to the inflow of Dutch nationals.

== History ==
Emlichheim has existed at least since Charlemagne’s time. In a document from 1312, the community crops up under the name Emminchem.

In old Dutch documents (16th to 19th century), and even today in the Low Saxon dialects, Emlichheim is called Emmelkamp.

== Politics ==
=== Municipal council ===
Council’s current composition (19 seats in total):

- CDU - 8 seats
- SPD - 7 seats
- FDP - 2 seats
- Grafschafter Bürger Forum (gbf) - 2 seats

(State: municipal election by 11. September 2011)

=== Partner communities ===
- Genemuiden, Netherlands since about 1975
- Grabów nad Prosną, Poland since 2006

== Economy ==
The firm Emsland-Stärke, with its location in Emlichheim, is one of Europe’s starch producers. Over a million metric tons of potatoes delivered from within a region with a radius of some 150 km are processed here every year, thereby making Emsland-Stärke the community’s largest employer.

Some 8 km west of Emlichheim lies the border-straddling industrial park within the communities of Laar in Germany and Coevorden in the Netherlands called EUROPARK. Here, a hotly disputed rubbish burning site, the Müllverbrennungsanlage Emlichheim, is supposed to be built by a private Dutch investor.

Another economic factor of the Emlichheim Samtgemeinde is the plastics processing industry. Among these businesses are Synco and BekuPlast in Ringe and Ringoplast in Ringe-Neugnadenfeld.

== Education ==
Emlichheim has a primary school, a Hauptschule-Realschule, a Gymnasium for secondary level 1 and a special school. These schools supply basic educational needs, but further needs must be sought either in Neuenhaus (Lise-Meitner-Gymnasium) or in the district seat of Nordhorn. In Nordhorn learners have almost every possibility at their disposal (general-education Gymnasien, specialized Gymnasien, vocational training schools, and so on).

== Famous people ==
=== Sons and daughters of the community ===
- Dr. Frank Schindelhauer, medical corps brigadier
