= Karl Smidt =

- Born: 30 August 1903; Neuenhaus, German Empire
- Died: 11 January 1984 (aged 80); Rendsburg, West Germany
- Military career
- Allegiance: Nazi Germany; West Germany
- Branch: Kriegsmarine; German Navy
- Service years: 1922–45; 1956–63
- Rank: Kapitän zur See; Konteradmiral (Bundesmarine)
- Commands: Jaguar destroyer Z12 Erich Giese destroyer Z27
- Conflicts: Spanish Civil War; World War II
- Awards: Knight's Cross of the Iron Cross

Karl Ernst Smidt (30 August 1903 – 11 January 1984 (Note: According to Dörr date of death is 10 January 1984, according to Scherzer 11 January 1984; his death announcements and obituaries in German newspapers proof that it was 11 January.)) was a German naval commander who reached the rank of Konteradmiral with the West German Navy. He served during World War II and was a recipient of the Knight's Cross of the Iron Cross of Nazi Germany. From 1961 to 1963, he was the NATO Commander-in-Chief of the German Fleet of the North Sea and the Baltic Sea.

== Early life and pre-war service ==
Smidt was born in Neuenhaus, district of Grafschaft Bentheim, in the Province of Hanover on 30 August 1903, the son of pastor Reinhard Petrus Wolbertus Smidt. He began his naval career with the Reichsmarine on 31 March 1922 as a member "Crew 1922" (the incoming class of 1922) after graduation from the humanistische Gymnasium (humanities-oriented secondary school) in Hameln with his Abitur (diploma). Smidt married Ruth Kühl in 1930.

The marriage produced two daughters and a son, Antje, Hilke, and Wolbert Klaus, former First Director with the Federal Intelligence Service (Bundesnachrichtendienst). Smidt joined the Confessing Church (Bekennende Kirche) with pastor Hermann Steen in Holthusen, district of Weener, after making an official visit to the Emsland concentration camp Esterwegen near Papenburg in 1935.

== Awards ==
- Wehrmacht Long Service Award 4th and 3rd Class (2 October 1936)
- Spanish Cross in Bronze with Swords (6 June 1939)
- Iron Cross (1939) 2nd Class (6 November 1939) & 1st Class (8 December 1939)
- Officer of the Order of the Crown of Italy (11 March 1941)
- German Cross in Gold on 20 November 1941 as Korvettenkapitän on Z27/8. Zerstörer-Flottille
- Knight's Cross of the Iron Cross on 15 June 1943 as Kapitän zur See and commander of Z27
- Commander Cross of the Order of Merit of the Federal Republic of Germany (14 August 1963)

== Notes ==
Military offices
Preceded by Konteradmiral Rolf Johannesson	Commander-in-Chief German Fleet (CINCGERFLEET); 1961 – 1963	Succeeded by Vizeadmiral Heinrich Gerlach
