= Uelsen (Samtgemeinde) =

Samtgemeinde in Lower Saxony, Germany

- Samtgemeinde
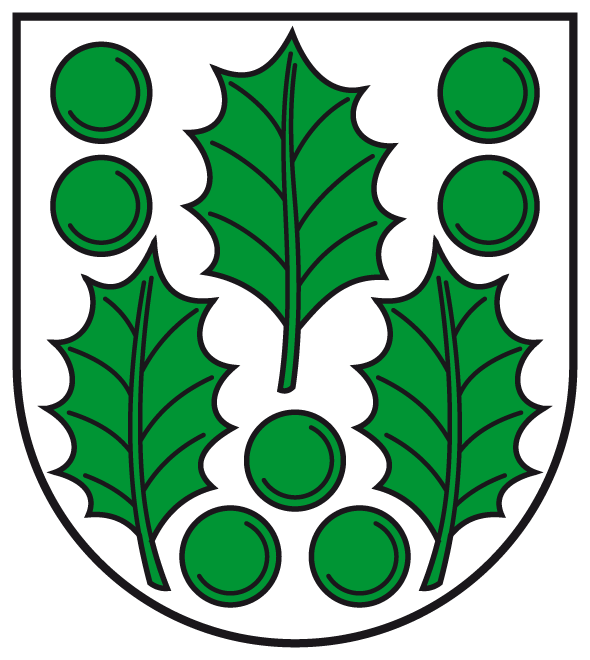
- Coat of arms

- Location of Uelsen within Bentheim district
- Interactive map of Uelsen
- Location within Germany Location within Lower Saxony
- Coordinates: 52°30′N 6°53′E
- Country: Germany
- State: Lower Saxony
- District: Bentheim
- Seat: Uelsen
- Subdivisions: 7 municipalities

Area
  - Total: 193.25 km^{2} (74.61 sq mi)

Population (2025-12-31)
  - Total: 11,468
  - Density: 59.343/km^{2} (153.70/sq mi)
- Time zone: UTC+01:00 (CET)
  - Summer (DST): UTC+02:00 (CEST)
- Website: www.uelsen.de

Uelsen is a Samtgemeinde ("collective municipality") in the district of Bentheim, in Lower Saxony, Germany. Its seat is in the municipality Uelsen.

The Samtgemeinde Uelsen consists of the following municipalities:

1. Getelo
2. Gölenkamp
3. Halle
4. Itterbeck
5. Uelsen
6. Wielen
7. Wilsum

== History ==
The area around Uelsen has been inhabited since prehistoric times, with archaeological evidence of settlement in the region. Uelsen was first mentioned in historical records from 1131 by the Bishop of Utrecht, Andries van Cuijk.

Administrative cooperation between Uelsen and neighboring municipalities developed during the 20th century. A joint administrative arrangement was established in 1950, and a further cooperation led to the creation of the Samtgemeinde Uelsen in 1974 as part of local government reforms in Lower Saxony.
