= Hoogstede =

- Municipality
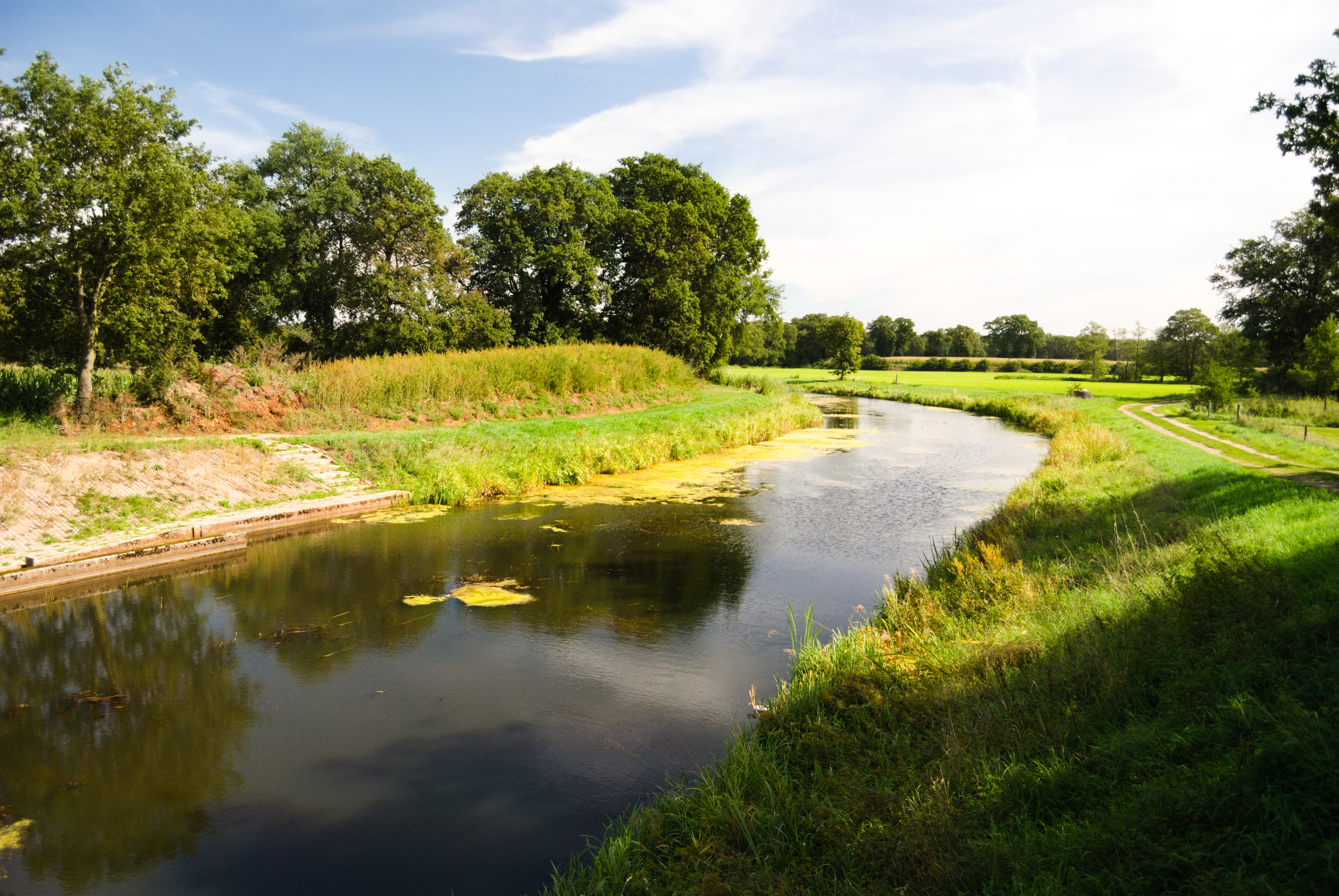

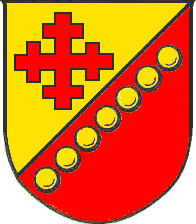
- Flag Coat of arms

- Location of Hoogstede within Grafschaft Bentheim district
- Interactive map of Hoogstede
- Location within Germany Location within Lower Saxony
- Coordinates: 52°34′59″N 06°57′00″E
- Country: Germany
- State: Lower Saxony
- District: Grafschaft Bentheim
- Municipal assoc.: Emlichheim
- Subdivisions: 7 Ortsteile

Government
  - Mayor: Jan Ensink (CDU)

Area
  - Total: 49.79 km^{2} (19.22 sq mi)
- Elevation: 14 m (46 ft)

Population (2025-12-31)
  - Total: 2,888
  - Density: 58.00/km^{2} (150.2/sq mi)
- Time zone: UTC+01:00 (CET)
  - Summer (DST): UTC+02:00 (CEST)
- Postal codes: 49846
- Dialling codes: 05944
- Vehicle registration: NOH
- Website: www.hoogstede.de

Hoogstede (German pronunciation: [ˈhoːkˌʃteːdə]) is a community in the district of Grafschaft Bentheim in Lower Saxony, in north-western Germany.

== Geography ==
=== Location ===
Hoogstede lies northwest of Nordhorn on the German-Dutch border. The Vechte flows through town, and its tributary, the Lee empties into it here. The community belongs to the Joint Community (Samtgemeinde) of Emlichheim, whose administrative seat is in the like-named community.

=== Constituent communities ===
The community's seven centres are Hoogstede, Kalle, Tinholt, Arkel, Bathorn, Scheerhorn and Berge.

== History ==
Hoogstede's history begins in 1821 when the Evangelical-Reformed parish's chapel was moved from Arkel to Hoogstede. In 1859, the Catholic church was built, and by and by a population centre developed. In 1953, the Evangelical-Old Reformed church was built, and in 1961 the Lutheran church.

Today, roughly 2,900 people live in Hoogstede and its outlying centres.

During World War II, the Stalag 308 prisoner-of-war camp was located in Bathorn from December 1944 until its liberation in April 1945.

== Religion ==
Hoogstede is home to four churches:

- Evangelical-Reformed
- Evangelical-Old Reformed
- Evangelical-Lutheran
- Catholic

== Politics ==
=== Municipal council ===
Hoogstede's council is made up of 13 councillors.

- CDU 10 seats
- SPD 2 seats
- FDP 1 seat

(as of municipal election on 10 September 2006)

=== Mayor ===
The honorary mayor Jan Ensink was elected on 14 November 2006 at the municipal council's constitutive meeting.

== Clubs and associations ==
Various clubs and associations have established themselves:

- Hoogsteder Sportverein (sport club)
- Landjugend Hoogstede (“rural youth”)
- Ortsfeuerwehr Hoogstede (fire brigade)
- DRK-Ortsverein Hoogstede (German Red Cross)
- Grafschafter Autocross Club GACC
- Heimatverein Hoogstede-Arkel (“homeland club”)
- Schützenverein Hoogstede (shooting club)
- Schützenverein Niedergrafschafter Edelweiß-Schützen Bathorn (shooting club)
