= Getelo =

- Municipality
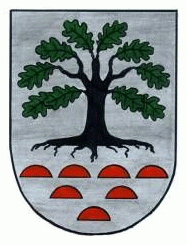
- Coat of arms

- Location of Getelo within Grafschaft Bentheim district
- Interactive map of Getelo
- Location within Germany Location within Lower Saxony
- Coordinates: 52°28′00″N 06°50′59″E
- Country: Germany
- State: Lower Saxony
- District: Grafschaft Bentheim
- Municipal assoc.: Uelsen
- Subdivisions: 2 centres

Government
  - Mayor: Jan-Hindrik Schipper

Area
  - Total: 20.24 km^{2} (7.81 sq mi)
- Elevation: 68 m (223 ft)

Population (2025-12-31)
  - Total: 494
  - Density: 24.4/km^{2} (63.2/sq mi)
- Time zone: UTC+01:00 (CET)
  - Summer (DST): UTC+02:00 (CEST)
- Postal codes: 49843
- Dialling codes: 0 59 42
- Vehicle registration: NOH
- Website: www.uelsen.de

Getelo is a community in the district of Grafschaft Bentheim in Lower Saxony.

== Geography ==
=== Location ===
Getelo lies west of Nordhorn on the border with the Netherlands. It belongs to the Joint Community (Samtgemeinde) of Uelsen, whose administrative seat is in the like-named community.

=== Constituent communities ===
The community’s two centres are Getelo and Getelomoor.

== Politics ==
=== Mayor ===
The honorary mayor Jan-Hindrik Schipper was elected on 9 September 2001.

== Culture and sightseeing ==
=== Buildings ===
Söven Pölle, barrows from the Bronze Age, are found in the community. The name gives the number as seven, although there were once as many as 26.

== Economy and infrastructure ==
=== Transport ===
Various state highways and district roads join the community to Bundesstraße 403, about 10 km away.
