= Gölenkamp =

- Municipality
- Coat of arms

- Location of Gölenkamp within Grafschaft Bentheim district
- Interactive map of Gölenkamp
- Location within Germany Location within Lower Saxony
- Coordinates: 52°31′00″N 06°55′00″E
- Country: Germany
- State: Lower Saxony
- District: Grafschaft Bentheim
- Municipal assoc.: Uelsen
- Subdivisions: 3 centres

Government
  - Mayor: Fritz-Geert Everink

Area
  - Total: 20.95 km^{2} (8.09 sq mi)
- Elevation: 19 m (62 ft)

Population (2025-12-31)
  - Total: 597
  - Density: 28.5/km^{2} (73.8/sq mi)
- Time zone: UTC+01:00 (CET)
  - Summer (DST): UTC+02:00 (CEST)
- Postal codes: 49843
- Dialling codes: 0 59 41
- Vehicle registration: NOH
- Website: www.uelsen.de

Gölenkamp is a community in the district of Grafschaft Bentheim in Lower Saxony.

== Geography ==
=== Location ===
Gölenkamp lies northwest of Nordhorn. It belongs to the Joint Community (Samtgemeinde) of Uelsen, whose administrative seat is in the town of the same name.

=== Constituent communities ===
The community’s three centres are Gölenkamp, Haftenkamp and Hardinghausen.

== Politics ==
=== Mayor ===
Jan Benierman was elected honorary mayor in 2006.

== Culture and sightseeing ==
=== Buildings ===
Spöllberg, a barrow from the Bronze Age, is located in Gölenkamp.
