= Ernst Forsthoff =

German scholar

- Born: 13 September 1902; Laar Mmhb
- Died: 13 August 1974 (aged 71); Heidelberg
- Occupation: Jurist

Ernst Forsthoff (13 September 1902, in Laar – 13 August 1974, in Heidelberg) was a German scholar of constitutional law and a leading theorist of administrative law.

== Life ==
Forsthoff, the son of pastor Heinrich Forsthoff, was called to teach law at the Johann Wolfgang Goethe-Universität in Frankfurt am Main 1933, at the University of Hamburg in 1935, at the Albertina in Königsberg in 1936 and at the University of Vienna in 1942. There he was forbidden to exercise his teaching post by the Gestapo until 1943, when he was called to the University of Heidelberg.

After the war, he was dismissed from governmental service by order of the American military government, but was able to resume teaching in 1952. Forsthoff was a leading author of the Constitution of Cyprus and was president of the Supreme Constitutional Court of Cyprus from 1960 to 1963.

== Thought ==
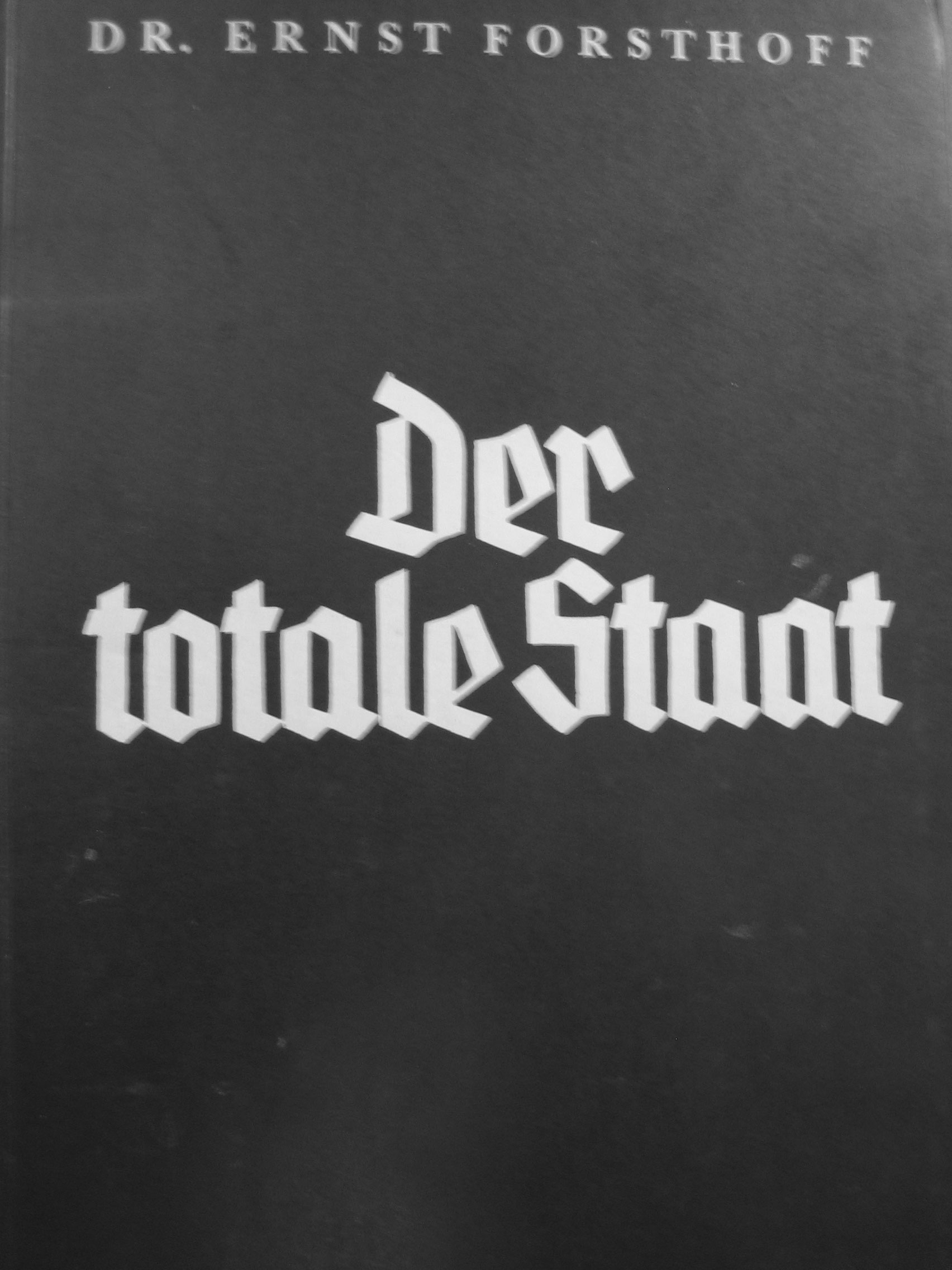
Cover page of: Ernst Forsthoff, Der totale Staat, Hanseatische Verlagsanstalt: Hamburg, 1934.

In the 1930s, Forsthoff was among the jurists such as Carl Schmitt, Karl Larenz, Theodor Maunz and Herbert Krüger who endeavoured to legitimise the Nazi regime through their writings. Forsthoff's 1933 paper Der totale Staat (The Total State) advocated a broad understanding of the Führerprinzip as an exclusive and unlimited power of command over all subjects of the state. He himself was unwilling to submit fully to the Nazi state, however, and fell in disfavour with the authorities during the war. In a seminal 1938 paper, he coined the term Daseinsvorsorge, introducing the concept of public services to German legal thinking.

After the war, although now supporting the democratic Rechtsstaat (which he understood as opposed to the Sozialstaat advocated by the Left), Forsthoff continued to support a powerful state subject to only limited judicial constraints and rejected the notion of constitutional rights as a normative framework of society.

Forsthoff was among the few postwar European scholars who maintained adherence to the philosophy of strict legal positivism. His influential textbook Lehrbuch des Verwaltungsrechts (1950) also emphasized the comprehensive responsibility of the state for society, preferring to focus on the functioning of government rather than on its possible failure.

== Partial bibliography ==
- Der totale Staat, Hamburg 1933.
- Deutsche Geschichte seit 1918 in Dokumenten, 1st ed. Leipzig 1935, 2nd ed. 1938, 3rd ed. 1943.
- Die Verwaltung als Leistungsträger, Kohlhammer Verlag Stuttgart-Berlin, 1938
- Verfassungsprobleme des Sozialstaates, Münster 1954.
- als Herausgeber: Rechtsstaatlichkeit und Sozialstaatlichkeit, Darmstadt 1968.
- Der Staat der Industriegesellschaft, München 1971.
- Lehrbuch des Verwaltungsrechts. Bd. I: Allgemeiner Teil, München, 1st ed. 1950, 10th ed. 1973.
