= Hans-Georg Wieck =

German diplomat (1928–2024)

Hans-Georg Wieck (28 March 1928 – 15 May 2024) was a German diplomat and was president of the German federal intelligence service Bundesnachrichtendienst (BND).

== Life and career ==
Wieck studied history and philosophy in Hamburg from 1947 to 1952 and received his PhD in 1953 with a dissertation named "The Origin of the Christian Democratic Union and the re-establishment of the Centre Party from 1945 to 1947."

From 1954 to 1993 he was an official at the Foreign Office for which he served as ambassador to Iran, the USSR and India. He was also permanent representative of the Federal Republic of Germany at the North Atlantic Council (NATO). He served at the Ministry of Defence inter alia as head of the Policy Planning Staff and became president of the BND from 1985 to 1990.

After his retirement from government service he was head of the OSCE Advisory and Monitoring Group in Minsk, Belarus from 1998 to 2001. From 1996 to September 2008 he was Chairman of the German - Indian Society.

Later Wieck was advisor to the Gesprächskreis Nachrichtendienste in Deutschland e.V. (GKND), a discussion group about intelligence services in Germany founded by his former colleague Wolbert Klaus Smidt in close cooperation with him.

Wieck was one of the critics of the regulation introduced by former German Foreign Minister Joschka Fischer that former diplomats who were NSDAP members were no longer honored after their death with an obituary in the bulletin of the Foreign Office.

Wieck died on 15 May 2024, at the age of 96.

Government offices
Preceded by Heribert Hellenbroich	President of the Federal Intelligence Bureau; 1985–1990	Succeeded by Konrad Porzner
