= Georgsdorf =

- Municipality
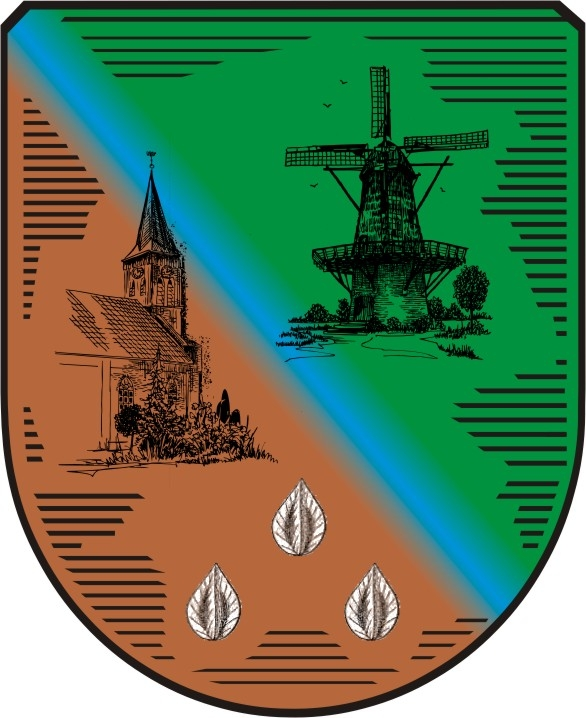
- Coat of arms

- Location of Georgsdorf within Grafschaft Bentheim district
- Interactive map of Georgsdorf
- Location within Germany Location within Lower Saxony
- Coordinates: 52°34′00″N 07°04′59″E
- Country: Germany
- State: Lower Saxony
- District: Grafschaft Bentheim
- Municipal assoc.: Neuenhaus

Government
  - Mayor: Anja Schupe

Area
  - Total: 19.29 km^{2} (7.45 sq mi)
- Elevation: 19 m (62 ft)

Population (2025-12-31)
  - Total: 1,286
  - Density: 66.67/km^{2} (172.7/sq mi)
- Time zone: UTC+01:00 (CET)
  - Summer (DST): UTC+02:00 (CEST)
- Postal codes: 49828
- Dialling codes: 05946
- Vehicle registration: NOH

Georgsdorf (German pronunciation: [ˈɡeːɔʁksˌdɔʁf]) is a community in the district of Grafschaft Bentheim in Lower Saxony.

== Geography ==
=== Location ===
Georgsdorf lies north of Nordhorn on the Süd-Nord-Kanal (South-North Canal) and the Coevorden-Piccardie-Kanal. It belongs to the Joint Community (Samtgemeinde) of Neuenhaus, whose administrative seat is in the like-named town.

== Politics ==
=== Mayor ===
The honorary mayor was Willi Beckert, but he died in May 2007, and since then Johann Scholten has been the new mayor.

== Culture and sightseeing ==
=== Buildings ===
Georgsdorf's best-known landmark is a windmill built in the traditional Dutch style in 1875 out of brick and with a thatched roof.

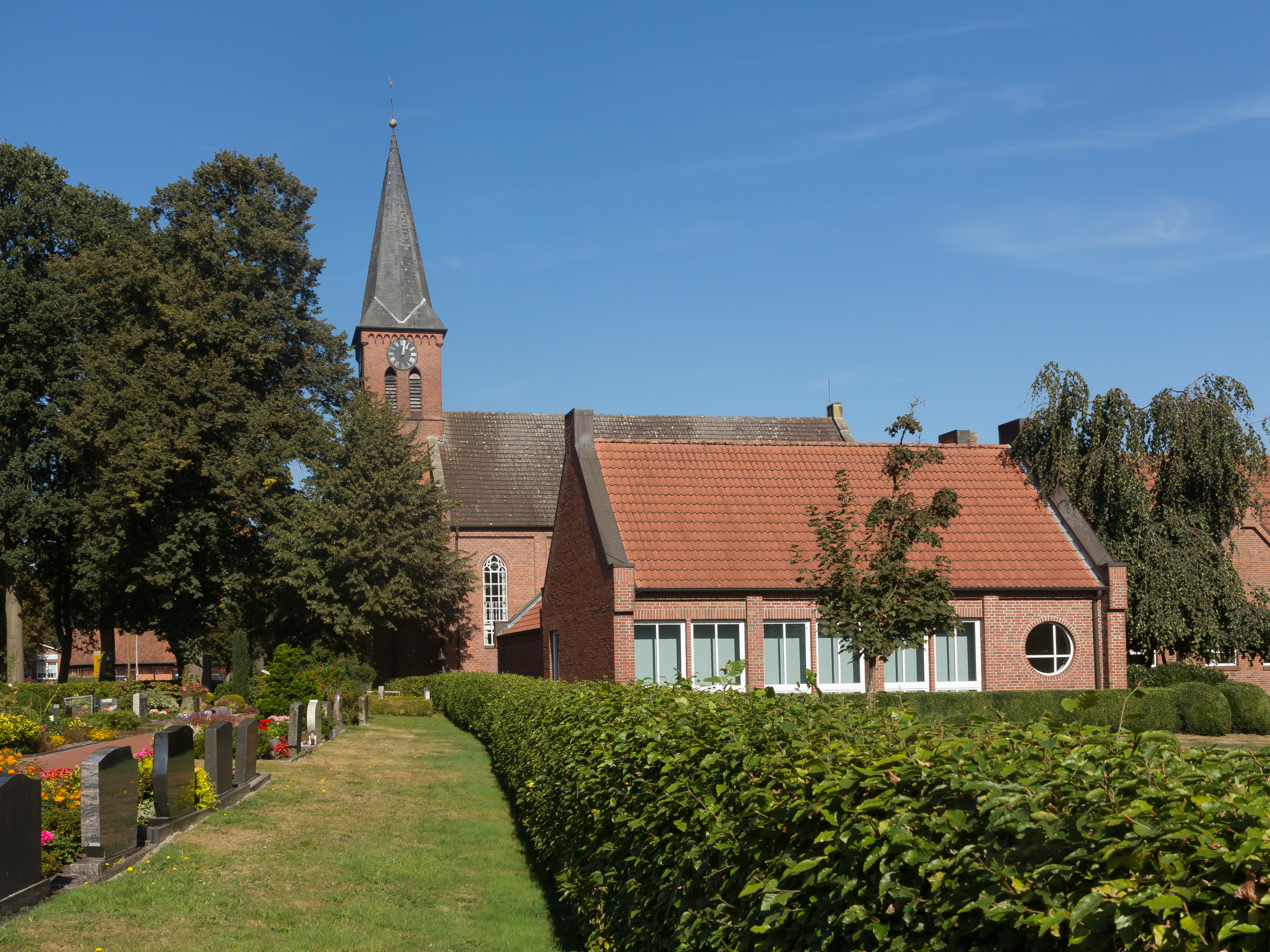
Reformed church

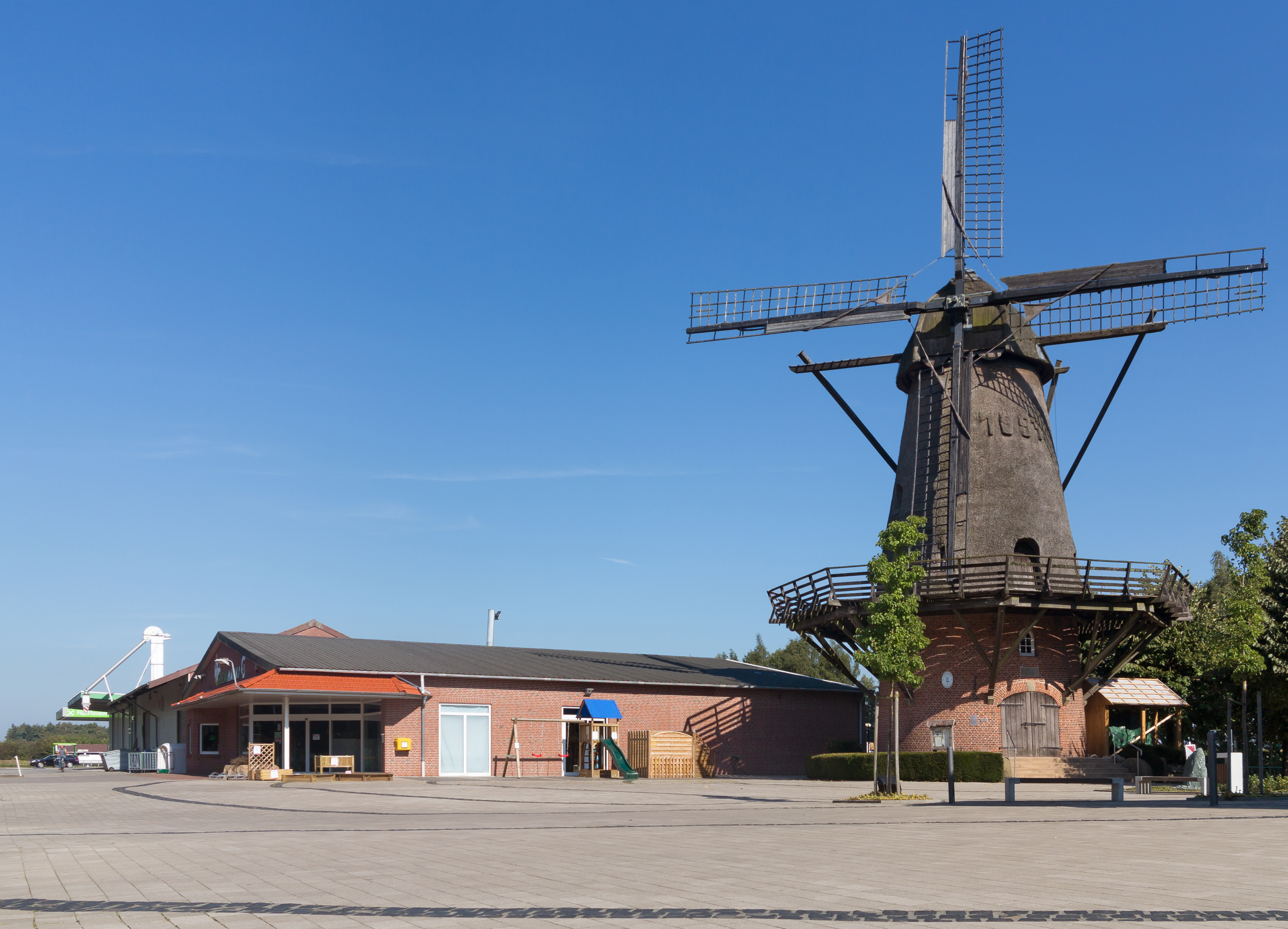
Windmill: die Georgsdorfer Mühle

== Economy and infrastructure ==
=== Transport ===
The Autobahn A 31 runs by the community roughly 10 km to the west.

=== Solar power ===
Nationwide, Georgsdorf has the highest number of solar power systems in proportion to population.
