= Emlichheim (Samtgemeinde) =

Samtgemeinde in Lower Saxony, Germany

- Samtgemeinde
- Location of Emlichheim within Bentheim district
- Interactive map of Emlichheim
- Location within Germany Location within Lower Saxony
- Coordinates: 52°37′N 6°51′E
- Country: Germany
- State: Lower Saxony
- District: Bentheim
- Seat: Emlichheim
- Subdivisions: 4 municipalities

Area
  - Total: 184.8 km^{2} (71.4 sq mi)

Population (2025-12-31)
  - Total: 14,620
  - Density: 79.11/km^{2} (204.9/sq mi)
- Time zone: UTC+01:00 (CET)
  - Summer (DST): UTC+02:00 (CEST)
- Website: www.emlichheim.de

Emlichheim is a Samtgemeinde ("collective municipality") in the district of Bentheim, in Lower Saxony, Germany. Its seat is in the municipality Emlichheim.

The Samtgemeinde Emlichheim consists of the following municipalities:

1. Emlichheim
2. Hoogstede
3. Laar
4. Ringe
