= Wolbert Klaus Smidt =

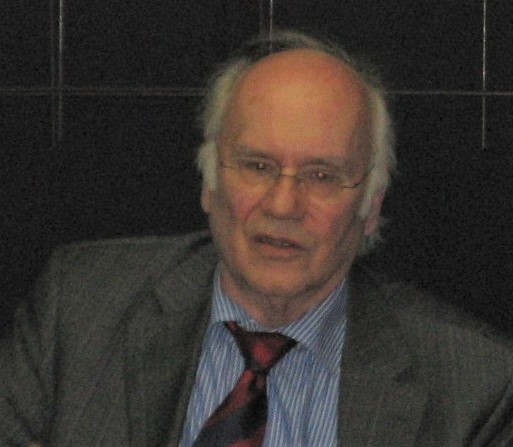
- Born: 11 April 1936; Wilhelmshaven, Germany
- Died: 29 January 2016 (aged 79); Hamburg, Germany
- Occupations: German intelligence officer; diplomat
- Relatives: Karl Smidt (father)

Wolbert Klaus Smidt (11 April 1936 in Wilhelmshaven – 29 January 2016 in Hamburg) was a high-ranking German secret service official, diplomat and publicist. He was First Director (Erster Direktor) at the German Federal Intelligence Service (Bundesnachrichtendienst) and Embassy Counselor in Paris.

== Career ==
Wolbert Klaus Smidt was a son of admiral Karl Smidt, the NATO commander of the West German navy fleet ("Flag Officer Germany"). After his studies of law at the universities of Mainz, Berlin, Munich and Kiel, Smidt joined the German Federal Intelligence Service in the 1960s in Pullach under their legendary founder Reinhard Gehlen. Among others, Smidt was responsible for intelligence on terrorism and international economic interconnections. Starting from the 1970s he was in charge of several special operations, about which details are not reported in the press.

Starting from the 1980s he was the official representative of the German Federal Intelligence Service in Paris, simultaneously acting as a diplomat and as the director of the Intelligence Service's branch in France. From 1989 he was responsible for networking and consultation in the process of reform and re-foundation of secret services in eastern European countries. At the end of his career he was first director of the department for operative intelligence.

Smidt had received high decorations such as the Bundesverdienstkreuz and Officier de l'Ordre national du Mérite of the French State.

== Public Engagement and Debates ==
In 2003 he founded the Think Tank "Gesprächskreis Nachrichtendienste in Deutschland" (GKND, German Forum for the Discussion of Intelligence) in Berlin, together with other high-ranking former secret service officials, journalists and academics, such as Hans-Georg Wieck, in order to contribute to the public debate on the role of secret services in the world. He was the association's president until 2012, and then acted as its honorary president. „The association was founded in order to contribute to a better informed debate about the role of secret services and provide 'intelligence about intelligence'

He organized numerous academic conferences in cooperation with influential German institutions, held numerous lectures and was considered a key-informant for the German press and political think tanks in questions of international terrorism and democratic control of secret services in modern democracies. He was one of the first high-ranking German government representatives who publicly denounced the alleged US American proofs for weapons of mass destruction in the Iraq as evident falsifications, easily recognizable as such by any professional secret service. In diverse publications and interviews he underlined the priority of civil rights and democratic principles over other interests of the state. The new laws issued after 9/11 in Germany, the US and other countries were seen as largely problematic by him, produced in great haste, going too far and even not being efficient. In 2005, the War on Terror was described by him as a dangerous development in international politics in German TV (3sat): „It was forgotten that one has to respect one's own principles when fighting terrorism. If one totally forgets about one's own core values, it is not worth it.“ His condemnation of secret actions of the CIA directed against Muslim individuals in Europe, which included illegal kidnappings, in 2005 received wide attention in the press. In 2011 he organized a conference on secret services and the question of ethics ("Ethik und Nachrichtendienste") at the Evangelische Akademie Bad Boll, with the participation of important representatives of the international intelligence community, from the USA, Russia, Israel, France among others.

He was involved in numerous book publications which focus on the question of the uneasy interconnection between democratic principles and secret services, among others together with the German government's Federal Agency for Civic Education (BPB)

== Publications ==
- Monograph: Nachrichtendienste im Spannungsfeld der Demokratie, Einsichten aus dem Inneren internationaler Geheimdienstarbeit, Lit-Verlag, Münster - Berlin 2018.
- Text contributions in: Andrea Szukula (ed.): Anti-Terror-Politik in Deutschland. (PDF) Köln: Lehrstuhl Internationale Politik 2003 (Arbeitspapiere zur Internationalen Politik und Außenpolitik, AIPA 4/2003), siehe auch Bundeszentrale für politische Bildung: Experten-Forum: Antiterrorpolitik in Deutschland, bpb.de
- „Haben die Dienste vor dem 11.9.2001 und bei der Aufklärung der Massenvernichtungswaffen im Irak versagt?“ In: Volker Foertsch, Klaus Lange (eds.): Islamistischer Terrorismus: Bestandsaufnahme und Bekämpfungsmöglichkeiten. Hanns-Seidel-Stiftung, München, 2005, S. 82–98, S. 172–184 (PDF; 75 kB)
- Brauchen wir eine Nachrichtendienst-Kultur? Fakten, Fragen, Forderungen. In: Volker Foertsch, Klaus Lange (eds.): Islamistischer Terrorismus und Massenvernichtungsmittel (= Argumente und Materialien zum Zeitgeschehen, 50). Hanns-Seidel-Stiftung, München, 2006, S. 29–41 (PDF; 1,3 MB)
- Wolfgang Krieger, Ulrike Poppe, Wolbert K. Smidt, Helmut Müller-Enbergs (eds.): Geheimhaltung und Transparenz, Demokratische Kontrolle der Geheimdienste im internationalen Vergleich (= Demokratie und Geheimdienste, 1). Lit-Verlag, Münster, 2007.
- Hans-Georg Wieck, Wolbert Smidt: Sécurité intérieure et extérieure de l’Europe: actions à mener. 2005
- Systeme parlamentarischer Kontrolle von Geheimdiensten – Versuch eines Vergleichs. In: Wolbert K. Smidt, Ulrike Poppe, Wolfgang Krieger, Helmut Müller-Enbergs (eds.): Geheimhaltung und Transparenz. Demokratische Kontrolle der Geheimdienste im internationalen Vergleich. Lit-Verlag, Berlin 2007, S. 235–256.

== Interviews ==
- Wilhelm Dietl, Josef Hufelschulte: Deutschland: „Wir waren die Schmuddelkinder“. Focus 44/2003, 27 October 2003
- Otto Langels: Jenseits von James Bond – Aus dem Leben eines Geheimdienstlers. SWR2 Eckpunkt, 22 June 2004, (Manuskript).
- Interview für den Newsletter der Evangelischen Akademie zu Berlin 2004
- 2005 „Secret CIA Flights – A legitimate Weapon in the War on Terror?“ / „CIA Geheimflüge – Ist im Kampf gegen den Terror alles erlaubt?“ Deutsche Welle-TV-Diskussion mit Dr. Andrew B. Denison, Wolbert Smidt, Wieslaw Wawrzyniak – http://www.transatlantic-networks.com/archiv_video.htm
- 2005 in 3sat: http://www.3sat.de/3sat.php?http://www.3sat.de/kulturzeit/lesezeit/86885/index.html
- 2006 Deutschlandradio zu BND-Präsenz im Irak „Ehemaliger BND-Direktor weist Vorwürfe gegen Geheimdienst zurück, Smidt: BND-Präsenz im Irak beweist Misstrauen gegenüber USA“: http://www.dradio.de/dkultur/sendungen/interview/458551/
- Interview in: Tagesspiegel, 2006
- 2007 On the cooperation between the German Democratic Republic (East Germany)'s secret service and the West German terrorist group RAF, 4 July 2007 | 20:15 bis 21:00 Uhr | NDR 1 Radio MV, http://www.mvschlagzeilen.de/der-feind-des-feindes-ist-unser-freund/272/
- 2011 in ARD-Radio-Feature „Mein Name ist: BND“, Podcast und Manuskript online

== Literature ==
- Georg von Mascolo (1997), "Suche Panzer, biete Lada", Der Spiegel, 1 December 1997, no. 49, pp. 68–74
- Josef Hufelschulte: Affäre: Drama um „Kosak 3“. Focus 45/2004, 30 October 2004 on Norbert Juretzko: Bedingt dienstbereit.
- "CIA-Affäre: Paris prüft Hinweise auf Geheimflüge". Spiegel Online. December 2, 2005.
- Georg von Mascolo, Holger Stark (2006), "Operation Facelifting", Der Spiegel, 20 February 2006, no. 8, pp. 42–45
- Eric Gujer: Kampf an neuen Fronten, Wie sich der BND dem Terrorismus stellt. Campus, Frankfurt am Main, 2006, ISBN 978-3-593-37785-8
- zur Tagung der Evangelischen Akademie in Berlin unter dem Generalthema „Asyl für die RAF“ In: taz, 30 April 2007. See also Dorothea Jung: Das zweite Leben in der DDR: Serie zum „Deutschen Herbst“, Teil 5. Deutschlandradio, 7 September 2007.
- Florian Klenk, Jochen Bittner: RAF: Graue Männer, rote Armee. Die Zeit 18/2007, 26 April 2007
