= Uelsen =

- Municipality
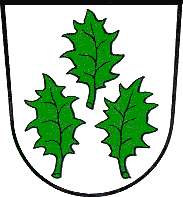
- Flag Coat of arms

- Location of Uelsen within Grafschaft Bentheim district
- Interactive map of Uelsen
- Location within Germany Location within Lower Saxony
- Coordinates: 52°30′N 6°52′E
- Country: Germany
- State: Lower Saxony
- District: Grafschaft Bentheim
- Municipal assoc.: Uelsen
- Subdivisions: 5 Ortsteile

Government
  - Mayor: Bernd Wever (SPD)

Area
  - Total: 19.46 km^{2} (7.51 sq mi)
- Elevation: 45 m (148 ft)

Population (2025-12-31)
  - Total: 5,930
  - Density: 305/km^{2} (789/sq mi)
- Time zone: UTC+01:00 (CET)
  - Summer (DST): UTC+02:00 (CEST)
- Postal codes: 49843
- Dialling codes: 0 59 42
- Vehicle registration: NOH
- Website: www.uelsen.de

Uelsen (German pronunciation: [ˈʔʏlsn̩]) is a community in the district of Grafschaft Bentheim in Lower Saxony.

== Geography ==
The community of Uelsen lies in westernmost Lower Saxony, on the border with the Kingdom of the Netherlands, roughly 30 km north of Enschede and 15 km northwest of Nordhorn.

== History ==
- About 690: The groundwork for the great parish of Uelsen was laid, probably by the missionary Willibrord.
- 1131: Uelsen was first mentioned in a document by the Bishop of Utrecht. At that time, Uelsen belonged to Twente (now in the Netherlands), which then belonged to the German Empire, as did Utrecht.
- About 1300: The castle of the Count ten Tooren or von Thurn stood in Uelsen. (The castle's remains were used in the mid-19th century as a synagogue.)
- 1312: Ownership of Uelsen passed to the Count of Bentheim.
- 1544: The Lutheran creed was introduced to Uelsen. Start of the Reformation.
- 1546: Under Emperor Charles V, border crossings were sealed and Uelsen was cut off from the Netherlands.
- 1580: Heavy fighting in the Uelsen woods in the Dutch Revolt between the Spanish and the Dutch.
- 1588: The Reformed creed was introduced.
- 1597: The Reformation ended.
- 1618 to 1648: The Thirty Years' War. The County of Bentheim (Grafschaft Bentheim) was supposedly neutral ground, but the people suffered great hardships. Münster, Lüneburg, Hessian and Swedish troops all moved into billets in the Uelsen community and extorted board and the people's last belongings.
- 1636: As a result of the war and widespread hunger, the plague broke out.
- 1650: The town hall was built.
- 1655: Bernhard von Galen, Bishop of Münster, waged war against Holland. Again fighting troops marched through the county.
- 1666: Bernhard von Galen concluded the Peace of Nordhorn.
- 1672: The new Bishop of Münster, Elijah von Corey again attacked the Netherlands after only six years’ peace.
- 1688: Count Ernst Wilhelm converted to the Catholic faith. The Reformed clergy he then also had replaced by Catholic clergy. The County pastors turned to the Netherlands, Dutch became the church's language, and until the late 19th century, it was also used in schools. Church hymns were still partly being sung in Dutch as late as 1933.
- 1756 to 1763: The Seven Years' War.
- 19th century: The population figures fell from 1200 to 806 as working-class families moved to Nordhorn or Schüttorf to find work in the textile industry. Some families also moved to the Netherlands or America.
- 1921: An electric company was founded.
- 1929 to 1931: A water supply system was built.
- 1933 to 1945: Uelsen and its outlying centres were NSDAP strongholds.
- 1974: Uelsen became the seat of the Joint Community (Samtgemeinde) of Uelsen, to which also belong the communities of Getelo, Gölenkamp, Halle, Itterbeck, Wielen and Wilsum.
- 31 December 2004: The Regierungsbezirk of Weser-Ems, which Uelsen belonged to, was abolished after administrative reform.
- 2006: Uelsen marked its 875 years of existence with a festival week.

The state-recognized health resort of Uelsen is the Joint Community's middle point and at the same time its seat.

== Partner town ==
Uelsen's partner town is Tubbergen in the Netherlands.

== Events ==
- Saisonauftakt (seasonal prelude): Saturday before Whitsun
- Volks- und Schützenfest (folk and shooting festival): 2nd weekend in July
- Herbstmarkt (Herbstkirmes; autumn market): 3rd weekend in October
- Weihnachtsmarkt (Christmas market): Saturday before 2nd day in Advent
