= Wilsum, Germany =

Wilsum
- Municipality
- Coat of arms

- Location of Wilsum within Grafschaft Bentheim district
- Interactive map of Wilsum
- Location within Germany Location within Lower Saxony
- Coordinates: 52°31′N 6°50′E
- Country: Germany
- State: Lower Saxony
- District: Grafschaft Bentheim
- Municipal assoc.: Uelsen

Government
  - Mayor: Heinrich Mardink (CDU)

Area
  - Total: 47.13 km^{2} (18.20 sq mi)
- Elevation: 42 m (138 ft)

Population (2025-12-31)
  - Total: 1,594
  - Density: 33.82/km^{2} (87.60/sq mi)
- Time zone: UTC+01:00 (CET)
  - Summer (DST): UTC+02:00 (CEST)
- Postal codes: 49849
- Dialling codes: 0 59 45
- Vehicle registration: NOH
- Website: www.wilsum.de

Wilsum is a community in the district of Grafschaft Bentheim in Lower Saxony, Germany near the Dutch border, and it belongs to the Joint Community (Samtgemeinde) of Uelsen.

== History ==
Wilsum had its first documentary mention in 851. Since the Middle Ages it has belonged to the County (now district) of Bentheim (Grafschaft Bentheim). In the Dutch Revolt, the community was very adversely affected in the years from 1580 to 1605; many inhabitants fled to the Netherlands. In 1725 a church was built.

== Religion ==
- Evangelical Reformed parish
- Evangelical Old Reformed parish (regionally also known as Koksch)

== Sightseeing ==
- Schoneveld's Mill, a watermill believed to have been built in the 13th century
