= County of Bentheim (district) =

District in Lower Saxony, Germany

Coordinates: 52°25′N 7°05′E

Grafschaft Bentheim
- District
- Flag Coat of arms
- Country: Germany
- State: Lower Saxony
- Capital: Nordhorn

Government
  - District admin.: Uwe Fietzek

Area
  - Total: 981 km^{2} (379 sq mi)

Population (31 December 2022)
  - Total: 141,269
  - Density: 140/km^{2} (370/sq mi)
- Time zone: UTC+01:00 (CET)
  - Summer (DST): UTC+02:00 (CEST)
- Vehicle registration: NOH
- Website: grafschaft.de

County of Bentheim (German: Grafschaft Bentheim) is a district (Landkreis) in Lower Saxony, Germany. It is bounded by (from the west and clockwise) the Dutch provinces of Overijssel and Drenthe, the district of Emsland, and the districts of Steinfurt and Borken in North Rhine-Westphalia.

== History ==
The District has roughly the same territory as the County of Bentheim, a state of the Holy Roman Empire that was dissolved in 1803.

== Geography ==
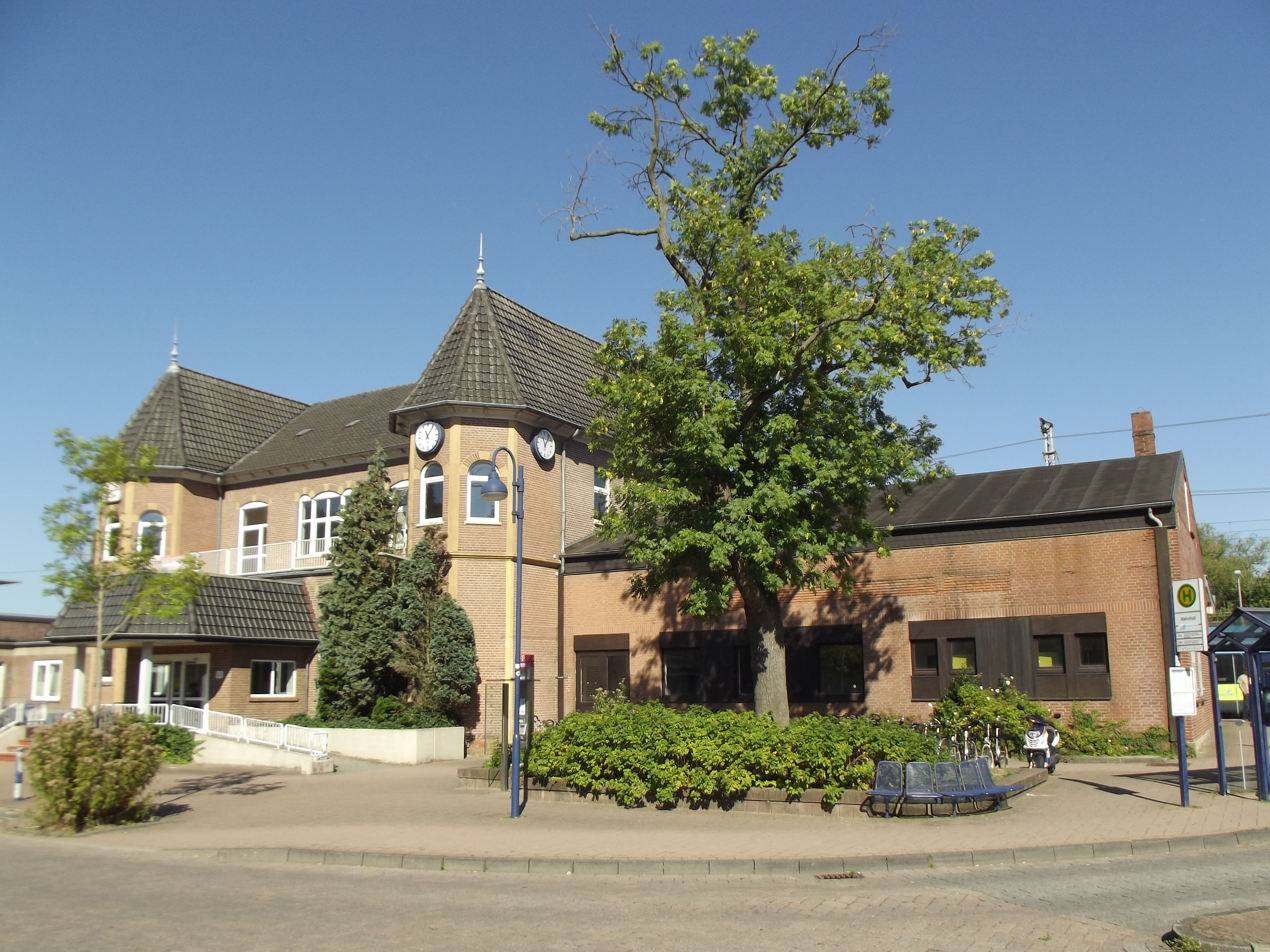
Railway station Bad Bentheim

The district's north-western region named Niedergrafschaft (low county) protrudes into Dutch territory, and borders it to the north, west and south. The Vechte River (Dutch Vecht) traverses the district from south to north and flows into the Netherlands.

== Coat of arms ==
The arms are identical to the arms of the historic County of Bentheim. The origin of these arms is unknown.

== Towns and municipalities ==
Clickable map of towns and municipalities in the district

Towns	Samtgemeinden
1. Bad Bentheim; 2. Nordhorn; Free municipalities: 1. Wietmarschen	1. Emlichheim; 1. Emlichheim^{1}; 2. Hoogstede; 3. Laar; 4. Ringe; 2. Neuenhaus; 1. Esche; 2. Georgsdorf; 3. Lage; 4. Neuenhaus^{1, 2}; 5. Osterwald	3. Schüttorf; 1. Engden; 2. Isterberg; 3. Ohne; 4. Quendorf; 5. Samern; 6. Schüttorf^{1, 2}; 4. Uelsen; 1. Getelo; 2. Gölenkamp; 3. Halle; 4. Itterbeck; 5. Uelsen^{1}; 6. Wielen; 7. Wilsum
	^{1}seat of the Samtgemeinde; ²town
