= Laar =

- Municipality
- Location of Laar within Grafschaft Bentheim district
- Interactive map of Laar
- Location within Germany Location within Lower Saxony
- Coordinates: 52°37′00″N 06°43′59″E
- Country: Germany
- State: Lower Saxony
- District: Grafschaft Bentheim
- Municipal assoc.: Emlichheim

Government
  - Mayor: Gerhard Trüün (CDU)

Area
  - Total: 51.01 km^{2} (19.70 sq mi)
- Elevation: 9 m (30 ft)

Population (2025-12-31)
  - Total: 2,050
  - Density: 40.2/km^{2} (104/sq mi)
- Time zone: UTC+01:00 (CET)
  - Summer (DST): UTC+02:00 (CEST)
- Postal codes: 49824
- Dialling codes: 05947
- Vehicle registration: NOH

Laar (German pronunciation: [ˈlaːɐ̯]) is a community in the district of Grafschaft Bentheim in Lower Saxony. The community’s name comes from the Old Dutch for “glade in the woods”.

== Geography ==
=== Location ===
Laar lies northwest of Nordhorn on the German-Dutch border. It belongs to the Joint Community (Samtgemeinde) of Emlichheim, whose administrative seat is in the like-named town. The Vechte runs through the community.

=== Neighbouring communities ===
The community of Laar borders in the south on the communities of Wielen and Wilsum, in the east on the community of Emlichheim, in the north on the Dutch community of Coevorden and in the west on the Dutch community of Hardenberg in Overijssel.

=== Constituent communities ===
The community of Laar consists of the six constituent centres (Ortsteile) of Agterhorn, Echteler, Eschebrügge, Heesterkante, Laar and Vorwald.

=== Religion ===
Although Laar is a small village, it nonetheless has three church parishes: Evangelical-Reformed, Catholic and Evangelical-Old Reformed.

== Politics ==
=== Municipal council ===
Laar’s council is made up of 13 councillors.

- CDU 10 seats
- SPD 1 seat
- gbf 2 seats

(as of municipal election on 10 September 2006)

=== Mayor ===
The honorary mayor Jan Hindrik Zwaferink was elected at the municipal council’s constitutive meeting.
