= Neuenhäusen =

- Stadtteil of Celle
- Interactive map of Neuenhäusen
- Location within Germany Location within Lower Saxony
- Coordinates: 52°36′33″N 10°04′17″E
- Country: Germany
- State: Lower Saxony
- District: Celle
- Town: Celle
- Elevation: 38 m (125 ft)

Population (2020-12-31)
  - Total: 7,940
- Time zone: UTC+01:00 (CET)
  - Summer (DST): UTC+02:00 (CEST)
- Postal codes: 29221
- Dialling codes: 05141

Neuenhäusen (German pronunciation: [nɔʏənˈhɔʏzn̩]) is a suburb of the town of Celle in Lower Saxony, Germany, and lies south of the Altstadt (old town) in its centre. A particular feature of this suburb is that it is where most of the many authorities and public institutions, that have their headquarters in Celle, are located.

== History ==
The village was established in 1680 under Duke George William of Brunswick-Lüneburg. The older "Altenhäusen" was incorporated along with Neuenhäusen in 1869 into the town of Celle. Neuenhäusen borders on the River Aller in the north, the River Fuhse in the east, the Wilhelm-Heinichen Ring road in the south and the railway facilities of the Hamburg-Hanover main line to the west.

== Politics ==
Neuenhäusen council represents the interests of the suburb to the town council and consists of nine councillors. The chair is Dr. Jörg Rodenwaldt since 2013.

== Places of interest ==
The neoclassical Neuenhäusen church was built in 1751 on the site of a 1710 chapel. In 1866 the clock tower was added and, in 1963, a small chapel was built onto it. It has numerous carvings by Hubert Distler.

Neuenhäusen Cemetery is a protected monument. Burials were conducted here as early as 1690. In part of the cemetery is the largest enclosed field of slab graves (Plattengräberfeld) in North Germany.

== Public authorities ==
The public authorities and other business institutions that are located in Neuenhäusen include the following:

- Celle District Court (Amtsgericht Celle)
- Celle Industrial Tribunal (Arbeitsgericht Celle)
- Celle Public Prosecutor's Office (Staatsanwaltschaft Celle)
- State Trade Control Office (Staatliches Gewerbeaufsichtsamt)
- State Planning and Building Inspection Department (Staatshochbauamt)
- Celle Tax Office (Finanzamt Celle)
- Celle District Council (Landkreis Celle)
- Celle Police Headquarters (Polizeiinspektion Celle)
- Celle Prison (Justizvollzugsanstalt)
- Celle State Stud Farm (Landgestüt Celle)
- Telephone Exchange (Fernmeldeamt)
- Customs House (Zollamt)
- Office of Weights and Measures (Eichamt)
- Mining Office (Bergamt)
- Schools inspectorate (Schulaufsichtsamt)
- Public Utilities (Stadtwerke)
- Celle railway station (Bahnhof)
- Congress Union Celle
- St Joseph's Hospital (Krankenhaus St. Joseph Stift)
- District Music School (Kreismusikschule)
- Altstadt School (Altstädter Schule)
- Empress Augusta Victoria Grammar School (Kaiserin-Auguste-Viktoria-Gymnasium)
- Celle Swimming Pool (Celler Badeland)
- Cambridge Dragoons Barracks Youth Centre (Jugendzentrum CD-Kaserne)
- German Staff Academy Celle (Deutsche Angestellten Akademie Celle)
- Eastern Europe Centre (Osteuropazentrum)
