= Itterbeck =

- Municipality
- Coat of arms

- Location of Itterbeck within Grafschaft Bentheim district
- Interactive map of Itterbeck
- Location within Germany Location within Lower Saxony
- Coordinates: 52°30′23″N 6°48′10″E
- Country: Germany
- State: Lower Saxony
- District: Grafschaft Bentheim
- Municipal assoc.: Uelsen
- Subdivisions: 7 Ortsteile

Government
  - Mayor: Lambertus Wanink

Area
  - Total: 41.01 km^{2} (15.83 sq mi)
- Elevation: 39 m (128 ft)

Population (2025-12-31)
  - Total: 1,697
  - Density: 41.38/km^{2} (107.2/sq mi)
- Time zone: UTC+01:00 (CET)
  - Summer (DST): UTC+02:00 (CEST)
- Postal codes: 49847
- Dialling codes: 05948
- Vehicle registration: NOH
- Website: www.itterbeck.net

Itterbeck in the district of Grafschaft Bentheim in Lower Saxony is an old farming community that has developed into an independent community with almost 1,800 inhabitants (2005). Itterbeck belongs to the Joint Community (Samtgemeinde) of Uelsen, whose administrative seat is in the like-named community.

The name Itterbeck springs from the brook that runs through the community, called the Itter. The Itterbeck landscape is marked by heath, woods and cultivated moorland. In the outlying centre of Egge is found an Evangelical Reformed chapel that belongs to the parish of Uelsen. Worth seeing are the nature reserve and Flora Fauna Habitat Itterbecker Heide (heath) and the Egger Riese (“Egge Giant”), an ice-age glacial erratic several metres high. In 2004, Itterbeck celebrated its 750th birthday.

Itterbeck's constituent communities (Ortsteile) are Itterbeck, Egge, Itterbeckermoor, Kleine Striepe, Balderhaarmoor, Itterbeckerdoose and Ratzel.

== Politics ==
Since the municipal election on 10 August 2006, the community council has consisted of eleven councillors, one woman and ten men. The mayor is Lambertus Warnink.

== Education and social services ==
Itterbeck has one elementary school. All further learning is handled by schools in neighbouring Uelsen. For younger children, the community has two play groups: in Itterbeck “Wonneproppen” and in Egge the “Egger Zwerge” (“Egge Dwarves”). Since 2001, there has moreover been in Egge a toddlers’ group (a Loslösegruppe in German) which cares for children from 2½ years on up. For older children there is an independent youth meeting place as well as children's afternoon groups organized by the YMCA and the Reformed church parish.

== Leisure ==
Itterbeck has at its disposal extensive cycling and hiking paths which lead either through the community or throughout the whole Lower County. Popular outing destinations are the Egger Riese, the Itterbeck Heath and the sources of the Itter. For some time, the Hof für Heimatpflege (“Yard for Homeland Fostering”), which brings Itterbeck's past back to life, has been drawing many visitors under its spell. A costume group belongs to this, and wears authentic, historic Itterbeck costumes.

Furthermore, tennis courts, football fields and a wading pool are also open to public use in the community.
