= Neuenhaus (Samtgemeinde) =

Samtgemeinde in Lower Saxony, Germany

- Samtgemeinde
- Location of Neuenhaus within Bentheim district
- Interactive map of Neuenhaus
- Location within Germany Location within Lower Saxony
- Coordinates: 52°30′N 6°58′E
- Country: Germany
- State: Lower Saxony
- District: Bentheim
- Seat: Neuenhaus
- Subdivisions: 5 municipalities

Area
  - Total: 101.48 km^{2} (39.18 sq mi)

Population (2025-12-31)
  - Total: 14,965
  - Density: 147.47/km^{2} (381.94/sq mi)
- Time zone: UTC+01:00 (CET)
  - Summer (DST): UTC+02:00 (CEST)
- Website: www.neuenhaus.de

Neuenhaus is a Samtgemeinde ("collective municipality") in the district of Bentheim, in Lower Saxony, Germany. Its seat is in the town Neuenhaus.

The Samtgemeinde Neuenhaus consists of the following municipalities:

1. Esche
2. Georgsdorf
3. Lage
4. Neuenhaus
5. Osterwald
