= Wielen =

- Municipality
- Location of Wielen within Grafschaft Bentheim district
- Interactive map of Wielen
- Location within Germany Location within Lower Saxony
- Coordinates: 52°33′N 6°43′E
- Country: Germany
- State: Lower Saxony
- District: Grafschaft Bentheim
- Municipal assoc.: Uelsen
- Subdivisions: 4 Ortsteile

Government
  - Mayor: Gerold Stroeve

Area
  - Total: 23.06 km^{2} (8.90 sq mi)
- Elevation: 20 m (66 ft)

Population (2025-12-31)
  - Total: 503
  - Density: 21.8/km^{2} (56.5/sq mi)
- Time zone: UTC+01:00 (CET)
  - Summer (DST): UTC+02:00 (CEST)
- Postal codes: 49847
- Dialling codes: 0 59 48
- Vehicle registration: NOH
- Website: www.uelsen.de

Wielen is a small village in the district of Grafschaft Bentheim in Lower Saxony, Germany, and belongs to the Joint Community (Samtgemeinde) of Uelsen. Wielen has 614 inhabitants. Within the village is found the Lower County's oldest maintained school, het Schöltien.

== Constituent communities ==
Along with the namesake Ortsteil, there are outlying centres named Balderhaar, Striepe and Vennebrügge.
