= Neuenhaus =

- Town
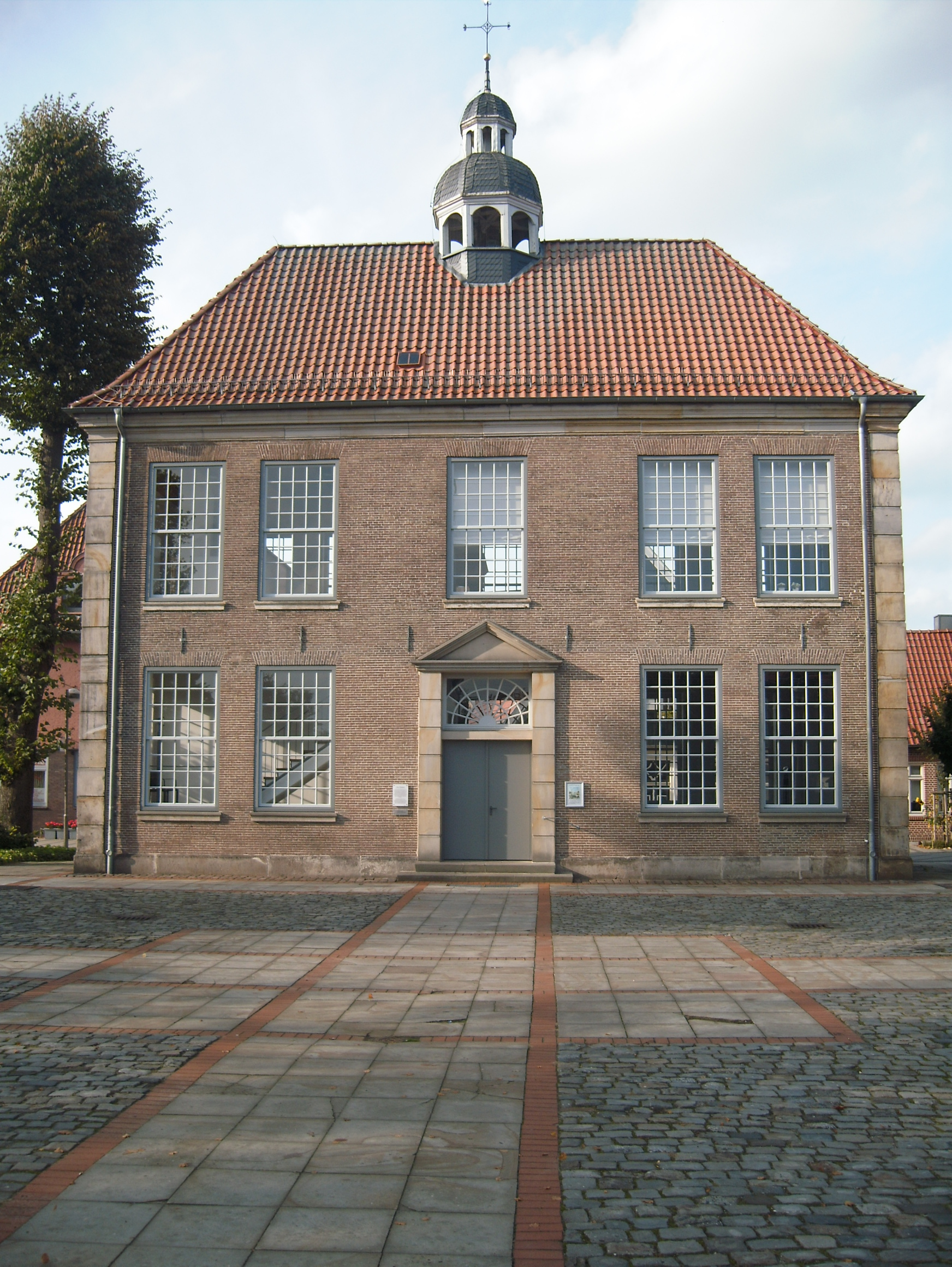
- Old Town Hall

- Flag Coat of arms

- Location of Neuenhaus within Grafschaft Bentheim district
- Interactive map of Neuenhaus
- Location within Germany Location within Lower Saxony
- Coordinates: 52°30′N 6°58′E
- Country: Germany
- State: Lower Saxony
- District: Grafschaft Bentheim
- Municipal assoc.: Neuenhaus

Government
  - Mayor: Paul Mokry (CDU)

Area
  - Total: 31.37 km^{2} (12.11 sq mi)
- Elevation: 17 m (56 ft)

Population (2025-12-31)
  - Total: 10,827
  - Density: 345.1/km^{2} (893.9/sq mi)
- Time zone: UTC+01:00 (CET)
  - Summer (DST): UTC+02:00 (CEST)
- Postal codes: 49828
- Dialling codes: 0 59 41
- Vehicle registration: NOH
- Website: www.neuenhaus.de

Neuenhaus (German pronunciation: [ˈnɔʏənˌhaʊs]; Low German: Neenhuus) is a town in the district of Grafschaft Bentheim in Lower Saxony, and is the seat of a like-named collective municipality Neuenhaus. Neuenhaus lies on the rivers Dinkel and Vechte near the border with the Netherlands and is roughly 10 km northwest of Nordhorn, and 30 km north of Enschede.

== History ==
Neuenhaus was founded in 1317 on the trade road between Münster and Amsterdam by Bentheim’s Count Johannes II, who also had a castle built for its security. The quickly growing new town was granted town rights in 1369. The town had at its disposal an Amt court and other authorities that were moved to the district seat of Nordhorn after the Second World War. Today’s town of Neuenhaus was enlarged in 1970 through the amalgamation of the formerly autonomous communities of Grasdorf, Hilten and Veldhausen, the last of which had already existed as early as the 10th century. By building two weirs on the Vechte and another on the river Dinkel, the flooding that had so often beset Neuenhaus in earlier years was brought under control.

The main street through Neuenhaus’s inner town has been dismantled since 2005 after a southwest bypass was built around the town.

Many old Ackerbürgerhäuser (roughly "gentleman farmers’ houses") have been or are being renovated.

The town's cycling paths are well signposted (a roughly 250 km network throughout the district) and lead through meadows and woods as well as alongside the rivers Vechte and Dinkel. Furthermore, the local gymnastic and sport club (known locally as the "TuS", for "Turn- und Sportverein"), is celebrating its 100-year jubilee.

=== Veldhausen ===
The outlying centre of Veldhausen is actually a more-than-1000-year-old parish village that has been amalgamated with the town of Neuenhaus since 1970. Nonetheless, Veldhausen has been able to keep some of its autonomy. There are roughly 2,200 villagers.

Veldhausen arose when farmers from the nearby communities of Esche, Grasdorf and Osterwald expressed a wish to have a place for their own new church, as it was too far for many to go to the church in Uelsen, and indeed even impossible in bad weather. Thus, a centrally located plot of unproductive land was sought, of the kind once known locally by the Dutch word veld, meaning "field" (Dutch was still used in officialdom in Veldhausen no more than 100 years ago). The first church is believed to have been built mainly of wood. Around this church over time settled craftsmen and gentleman farmers (Ackerbürger). Today’s stone Evangelical-Reformed church, along with the windmill and neighbouring mill park, counts itself among Veldhausen’s landmarks.

On the mill park grounds, the Brauchtum- und Mühlenverein – Tradition and Mill Club – have built an old miller’s house and a bakehouse. In the bakehouse, hobby bakers bake bread made out of the flour ground at the mill.

== Politics ==
The current town council’s seats are apportioned thus:

- CDU: 13 seats
- SPD: 11 seats
- Bündnis 90/Die Grünen: 1 seat

The town’s mayor is Paul Mokry.

=== Coats of arms ===
Neuenhaus’s arms might heraldically be described thus, although the wavy bend parting is considered to be unheraldic: Party per bend wavy sinister, in gules a war tent argent surmounted by a crown argent, in the chief sinister four orbs Or, in Or a house gules with stepped gables and tower on the peak of the roof.

The greater charge in the red part of the shield is a Dutch baron’s war tent, and the four orbs next to it stand for the Counts of Bentheim. The house with stepped gables is a charge taken from the town’s seal, borne since 1400.

==== Veldhausen ====
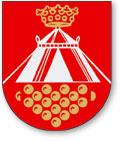
Veldhausen’s arms

Veldhausen’s arms likewise show a war tent with a baronial crown over it, referring to Dutch Commander Carl von Rabenhaupt, Baron at Sucha, whose headquarters in 1673-1674, in his campaign against Christoph Bernhard von Galen, Prince-Bishop of Münster, were in Veldhausen.

== Transportation ==
Neuenhaus lies on Bundesstraße 403 running from Nordhorn into the Netherlands. There is further a railway link following roughly the same route; however, there had been no passenger service on the line since the mid-1970s, although the line still handled goods. The passenger service resumed on 7 July 2019 with the following train stations on the line RB56: Neuenhaus - Neuenhaus Süd - Nordhorn - Nordhorn Blanke - Quendorf - Bad Bentheim

== Clubs ==
- Astronomischer Verein der Grafschaft Bentheim e.V. (district astronomical club)
- SV Borussia 08 Neuenhaus e.V. (soccer club)
- CVJM Veldhausen (YMCA)
- Ev.-ref. Posaunenchor Veldhausen (choir)
- Kulturpass Neuenhaus e.V.
- Kunstverein Grafschaft Bentheim e.V. (art club)
- Mühlen- und Brauchtumsverein e.V. (Tradition and Mill Club)
- Freiwillige Feuerwehr Neuenhaus (volunteer fire department)
- Ortsfeuerwehr Veldhausen (volunteer fire department)
- Rassegeflügelzuchtverein Veldhausen e.V. (thoroughbred fowl raising)
- SG Neuenhaus/Uelsen (sport club)
- Sozialverband Deutschland Ortsverband Veldhausen
- Sturmvögel Hilten/Lemke e.V (sport club)
- SV Veldhausen 07 e.V. (soccer club)
- TC RW Neuenhaus e.V
- Trachtenfreunde Veldhausen (costume club)
- TuS Neuenhaus (gymnastic and sport club)
- Unabhängiger Jugendtreff Neuenhaus e.V. (youth meeting)
- Veldhauser Werbegemeinschaft e.V. (advertising alliance)
- Verein für Brauchtum und Geselligkeit e.V.
- Werbegemeinschaft Neuenhaus e.V. (advertising alliance)

== Events ==
- Marksmanship festival on first weekend in July
- Town festival on last weekend in August
- Christmas Market behind the Old Town Hall on first weekend in Advent
- Changing of the Watch on New Year’s Eve
- Folk festival in Veldhausen on first weekend in August

== Notable people ==
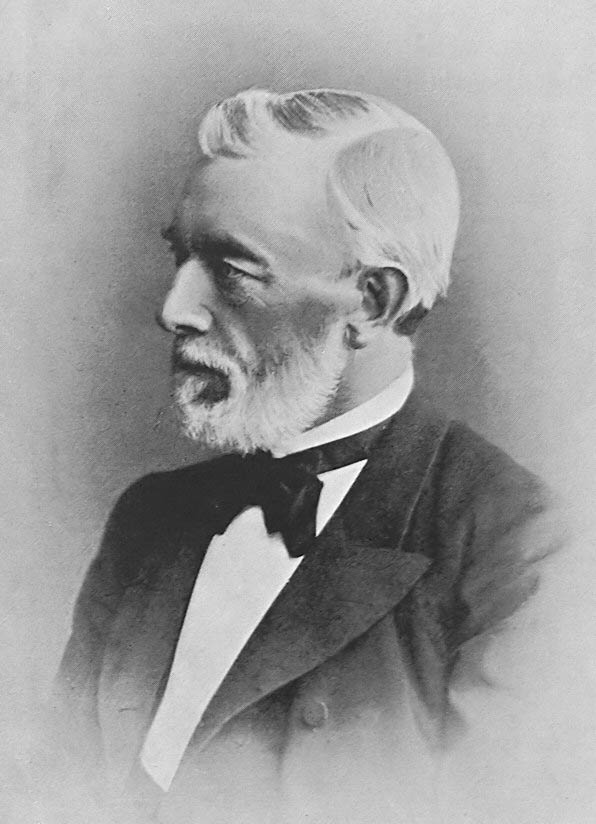
Johannes von Miquel

- Friedrich Anton Wilhelm Miquel (1811-1871), German-Dutch botanist
- Johannes von Miquel (1829-1901), said to be the "Forefather of All Fiscal Reformers", was Prussian Finance minister, later Chief Mayor (Oberbürgermeister) of Osnabrück and Frankfurt am Main
- Wilhelm Staehle (1877–1945), German Resistance fighter and participant in the 20 July plot.
- Karl E. Smidt (1903–1984), West German admiral, NATO commander (fleet commander),
- Roland Riese (born 1960), politician of the FDP
- Hanna Naber (born 1971), politician
