= Ohne, Germany =

- Municipality
- Coat of arms

- Location of Ohne, Germany within Grafschaft Bentheim district
- Interactive map of Ohne, Germany
- Location within Germany Location within Lower Saxony
- Coordinates: 52°16′00″N 07°16′00″E
- Country: Germany
- State: Lower Saxony
- District: Grafschaft Bentheim
- Municipal assoc.: Schüttorf

Government
  - Mayor: Johann Ruschulte

Area
  - Total: 9.03 km^{2} (3.49 sq mi)
- Elevation: 40 m (130 ft)

Population (2025-12-31)
  - Total: 651
  - Density: 72.1/km^{2} (187/sq mi)
- Time zone: UTC+01:00 (CET)
  - Summer (DST): UTC+02:00 (CEST)
- Postal codes: 48465
- Dialling codes: 05923
- Vehicle registration: NOH

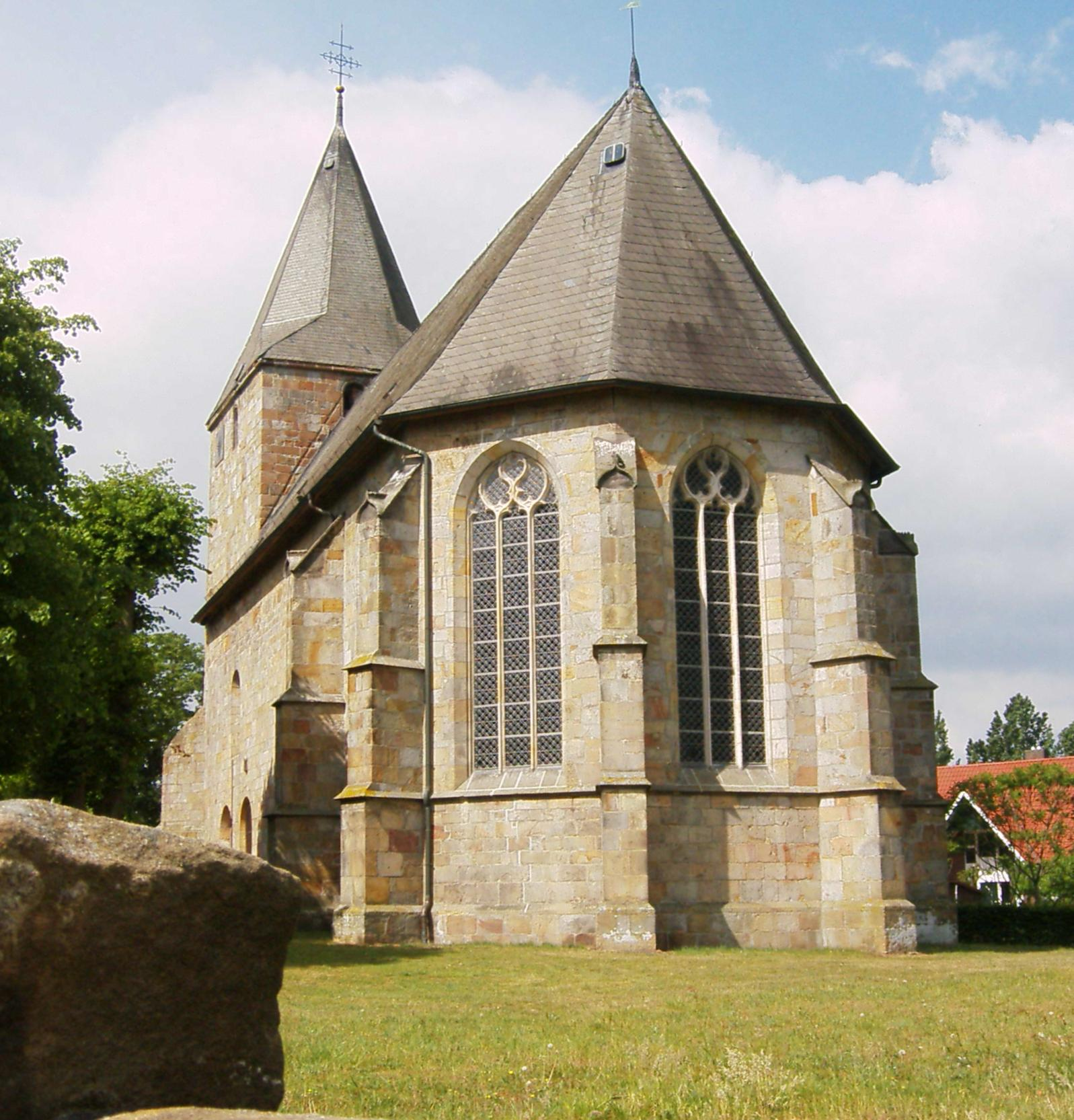
Church in Ohne, Grafschaft Bentheim's oldest church (partly from the 13th century)

Ohne (German pronunciation: [ˈoːnə]) is a community in the district of Grafschaft Bentheim in Lower Saxony, Germany.

== Geography ==
=== Location ===
Ohne lies between Nordhorn and Steinfurt on the boundary with North Rhine-Westphalia. The community belongs to the Joint Community (Samtgemeinde) of Schüttorf, which has its seat in the like-named town.

The community of Ohne in the southernmost and southeasternmost parts of the Joint Community of Schüttorf, shows a distinct, very compact village site and lies right on a ford on the river Vechte. With a self-contained village centre above the Vechte Valley, Ohne's settlement development, unlike any other rural community's, is characterized not by scattered locations but rather by an accumulation of homesteads and buildings. Even the scattered homesteads lie quite near the village itself with its church, play group and various other institutions typical of a village.

Beyond the village site, the municipal area is marked by widespread agricultural land (also places without farms) and in the westernmost part by woods that stretch to Bad Bentheim.

=== Neighbouring communities ===
Ohne's neighbours are Samern, Suddendorf, Brechte and Wettringen, the last two of which lie in Westphalia.

== History ==
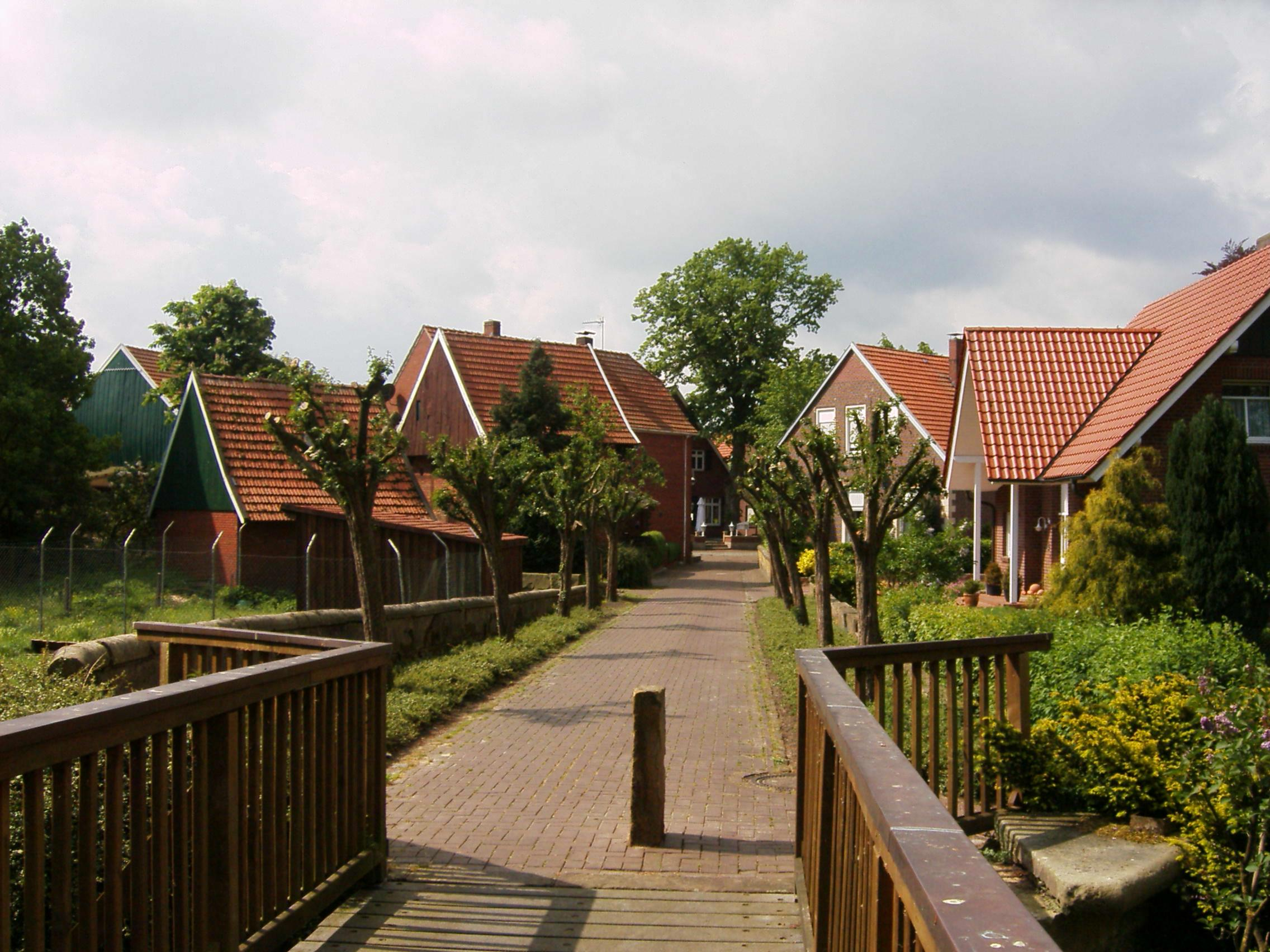
Way from the Vechtebridge into Ohne's centre

The area was already settled by the Old Stone Age. The village is Grafschaft Bentheim's oldest. It was Frankish immigrants who established the village of “Oen” in Carolingian times.

On the edge of the site where the village's original centre was, settlement spread outwards. The shape that the village has today was brought about not least of all by the Vechte Valley with its broad floodplain and, in the more recent past, by farmlands abutting the village site. The village's name was first mentioned in 1213 in the monosyllabic form “On” (in German, a final -e is usually pronounced, and given the “schwa” sound, making the name “Ohne” two syllables).

The name's modern form has given it the same pronunciation and spelling as a standard German word, and this has caused misunderstandings, as an event in June 2022 shows. At that time, the municipality had received a new road sign which was supposed to have the municipality's name on it, but owing to a misunderstanding, the road sign, while being of the required size and in the colours prescribed by law, was absolutely blank; neither the municipality's name, Ohne, nor any other text appeared on the sign. The misunderstanding had happened at the factory, where a worker had apparently misunderstood the entry "Ohne" on the order form, which was supposed to state the sign's contents. The worker, however, took it literally; "ohne" also happens to be the German word for "without".

Also found in Ohne is the municipal area's only windfarm, built according to municipal planning and already realized.

== Politics ==
=== Municipal council ===
Ohne's municipal council is made up of 9 councillors.

=== Mayor ===
The mayor Charlotte Ruschulte was elected in November 2011.

== Culture and sightseeing ==
The village has kept its traditional village character. L 68 (state highway) and K 25 (district road) keep through traffic well away from the village road. The finely designed, small village square lying in the middle of the village, where the warriors’ memorial once stood, is marked by old tree growth. There are four pollarded lindens and a further linden trimmed in a more usual way, and also two tall hawthorn trees. The square also still fulfils transport functions. The roadways are cobbled, and red paving stones have been laid over the park areas. The surrounding buildings fit in quite harmoniously with their red-brick façades or red clinker dressing.

Atypically, the village church does not stand right on the square, but rather one row of buildings back. From the square, a path runs through natural areas down to the Vechte. With its tall hawthorn trees, the path leads behind the church to a wooden bridge over the river. There are a table and benches for those who wish to tarry. East of the river, the path continues, bordered on each side by hedges, and ends at the district road as a cycling path.

=== Clubs ===
- Schützenverein Ohne-Haddorf e.V. (marksmen's club, founded 1827)
- Spielmannszug Ohne Haddorf e.V. (band, founded 1904)
- Ortsfeuerwehr Ohne (fire brigade, founded 1934)
- Landjugend Samern Ohne (founded 1947)
- Landfrauenverein Samern-Suddendorf-Ohne (rural women's club, founded 1949)
- Sport- und Spielvereinigung Ohne e. V. (sport and games, founded 1966)
- Schießsport-Freunde-Ohne-Haddorf e.V. (shooting sports)

One peculiarity at some clubs is that some members come from the community of Haddorf, which is in North Rhine-Westphalia, outside Ohne's state of Lower Saxony.

=== Buildings ===
The Evangelical-Reformed church is said to be Grafschaft Bentheim's oldest church, built as it was in the earlier half of the 13th century.

=== Regular events ===
- Kermis (on the first Tuesday in September and the Sunday before that)
- Evangelical-Reformed parish's Christmas Market (on the last Saturday before Advent)

== Economy and infrastructure ==
=== Transport ===
Autobahn A 31 can be reached 8 km from the community.

Since the beginning of May 2007, the Bürgerbus, line 510, has been running from Schüttorf by way of Ohne and Bilk to Wettringen, and by way of Haddorf, Ohne and Samern back to Schüttorf. The drivers work for free, and manage to keep the considerable costs down.

Two tourist cycling path projects, the Grafschafter Fietsentour (Fietse is a local word for “bicycle”) and the Vechtetalroute (“Vechte Valley Route”) lead through the village, showing the visitor how tightly knit the village is, and revealing something of communal life.

=== Development ===
In the community of Ohne, with its building lots as shown in its hitherto operative land use planning, there are still development opportunities to be had that will largely fulfil foreseeable demand.
