= Quendorf =

- Municipality
- Location of Quendorf within Grafschaft Bentheim district
- Interactive map of Quendorf
- Location within Germany Location within Lower Saxony
- Coordinates: 52°20′N 7°11′E
- Country: Germany
- State: Lower Saxony
- District: Grafschaft Bentheim
- Municipal assoc.: Schüttorf

Government
  - Mayor: Hermann Rademaker

Area
  - Total: 14.13 km^{2} (5.46 sq mi)
- Elevation: 31 m (102 ft)

Population (2025-12-31)
  - Total: 635
  - Density: 44.9/km^{2} (116/sq mi)
- Time zone: UTC+01:00 (CET)
  - Summer (DST): UTC+02:00 (CEST)
- Postal codes: 48465
- Dialling codes: 05922, 05923
- Vehicle registration: NOH

Quendorf (German pronunciation: [ˈkvɛnˌdɔʁf]) is a rural community belonging to the Joint Community of Schüttorf in southwestern Lower Saxony. There is no village centre. The community is made up of several settlements and scattered farms. In 1971, Quendorf joined the town of Schüttorf along with the communities of Drievorden (amalgamated with Engden since 1974), Engden, Neerlage (amalgamated with Isterberg since 1974), Ohne, Samern, Suddendorf and Wengsel (amalgamated with Isterberg since 1974) into the Joint Community of Schüttorf.

While the Autobahn A 30 was being built, a small lake arose, which is now used as a local recreation area. The Vechte, a small river that empties into the IJsselmeer splits the community area and offers anglers and canoeists an opportunity to pursue their hobbies in scenic surroundings.

A small primary school serves children from Quendorf and the neighbouring community of Isterberg. There is, of course, a yearly shooting festival held by the community’s marksmen’s club.
