= Engden =

- Municipality
- Location of Engden within County of Bentheim district
- Interactive map of Engden
- Location within Germany Location within Lower Saxony
- Coordinates: 52°24′N 07°11′E
- Country: Germany
- State: Lower Saxony
- District: County of Bentheim
- Municipal assoc.: Schüttorf
- Subdivisions: 2 centres

Government
  - Mayor: Gerhard Theißing (CDU)

Area
  - Total: 44.3 km^{2} (17.1 sq mi)
- Elevation: 29 m (95 ft)

Population (2025-12-31)
  - Total: 413
  - Density: 9.32/km^{2} (24.1/sq mi)
- Time zone: UTC+01:00 (CET)
  - Summer (DST): UTC+02:00 (CEST)
- Postal codes: 48465
- Dialling codes: 0 59 26
- Vehicle registration: NOH

Engden (German pronunciation: [ˈɛŋdn̩]) is a community in the district of the County of Bentheim in Lower Saxony.

== Geography ==
=== Location ===
Engden lies between Nordhorn and Schüttorf. It belongs to the Joint Community (Samtgemeinde) of Schüttorf, whose administrative seat is in the like-named town.

== Politics ==
Engden was and is dominated by a Catholic church milieu, and as such, markedly few Engdeners opted for the NSDAP in Nazi times.

=== Mayor ===
The honorary mayor Gerhard Theißing was elected on 9 September 2001.

== Culture and sightseeing ==
=== Buildings ===
The Katholische Kirche Abt St. Antonius (church) was built in 1899 as a neo-Romanesque brick structure.

The Dobbe warehouse may have been built about 1800 and is said to be northwest Germany’s oldest maintained rural grain distillery building, and as such it is an important industrial monument.

The Bügeleisen-Haus, or Clothes Iron House, came to be because the farmers would only relinquish to the house builder a narrow, tapered lot whose odd layout has resulted in the house's having no right angles at all. Building work began on the house “about 1900”, but it was finished only after the First World War.

== Economy and infrastructure ==
=== Transport ===
Autobahnen A 31 and A 30 lie 6 km from the community and are easily reached.

== Curiosity ==
Children from Engden go to school or kindergarten in Emsbüren, in another district.
