= Isterberg =

- Municipality
- Location of Isterberg within Grafschaft Bentheim district
- Interactive map of Isterberg
- Location within Germany Location within Lower Saxony
- Coordinates: 52°20′56″N 07°08′47″E
- Country: Germany
- State: Lower Saxony
- District: Grafschaft Bentheim
- Municipal assoc.: Schüttorf
- Subdivisions: 2 Ortsteile

Government
  - Mayor: Heinrich Verwold

Area
  - Total: 20.28 km^{2} (7.83 sq mi)
- Elevation: 35 m (115 ft)

Population (2025-12-31)
  - Total: 625
  - Density: 30.8/km^{2} (79.8/sq mi)
- Time zone: UTC+01:00 (CET)
  - Summer (DST): UTC+02:00 (CEST)
- Postal codes: 48465
- Dialling codes: 05922
- Vehicle registration: NOH

The community of Isterberg, in Lower Saxony’s district of Grafschaft Bentheim, came into being in the 1970s, through the amalgamation of the two former communities of Wengsel and Neerlage. It lies between Bad Bentheim and Nordhorn, and is part of the Samtgemeinde ("joint community") of Schüttorf (whose administrative seat is in the like-named town).

There is no actual village centre.

The namesake hill, the Isterberg—with an elevation of 68 m -- is one of the last outliers of the Teutoburg Forest. There is a local YMCA (CVJM Isterberg-Quendorf), which serves not only the youth, but also adults and older citizen, as a meeting point. The Landjugend (“Rural Youth”) is also established in the community; among other activities, it organizes a yearly tent festival that is well known throughout the former County of Bentheim. This small community also has its own volunteer fire brigade, which receives wide participation.

The farthest outlying portion of the Teutoburg Forest is not to be found right at the Isterberg, but rather in Bad Bentheim‘s outlying centre at the center of Gildehaus. On the way out of that centre, on Gronauer Str., going towards the Netherlands, the forest's last trees stand.

It is supposed, however, that the Teutoburg Forest once stretched all the way to the Fürstlicher Busch (Princely Bush), which lies in the farming community of Bardel.

Isterberg also has a no-fee outdoor swimming pool.
