= Schüttorf =

- Town
- Flag Coat of arms

- Schüttorf's location in Grafschaft Bentheim
- Interactive map of Schüttorf
- Location within Germany Location within Lower Saxony
- Coordinates: 52°19′N 7°13′E
- Country: Germany
- State: Lower Saxony
- District: Grafschaft Bentheim
- Municipal assoc.: Schüttorf

Government
  - Mayor: Jörn Tüchter (CDU)

Area
  - Total: 19.45 km^{2} (7.51 sq mi)
- Elevation: 33 m (108 ft)

Population (2025-12-31)
  - Total: 13,523
  - Density: 695.3/km^{2} (1,801/sq mi)
- Time zone: UTC+01:00 (CET)
  - Summer (DST): UTC+02:00 (CEST)
- Postal codes: 48465
- Dialling codes: 05923
- Vehicle registration: NOH
- Website: www.schuettorf.de

Schüttorf (German pronunciation: [ˈʃʏtɔʁf]; Northern Low Saxon: Schüttrup) is a town in the district of Grafschaft Bentheim in southwesternmost Lower Saxony near the Dutch border and the boundary with Westphalia (North Rhine-Westphalia). The town of Schüttorf forms with the surrounding communities the Joint Community (Samtgemeinde) of Schüttorf. It is the district's oldest town. It lies on the river Vechte, roughly 5 km east of Bad Bentheim, and 20 km southeast of Nordhorn.

== Geography ==
=== Location and landscape description ===
The town of Schüttorf lies in southwesternmost Lower Saxony and in the westernmost part of the Federal Republic of Germany. It is roughly 10 km to the Dutch border. With regards to the cultural makeup and to the natural environment, it lies in a transitional zone between the Emsland and Westphalia. The surroundings may be characterized as settled countryside. Middle centres in the area are, among others, Nordhorn and Rheine.

The town is crossed through the middle southeast to northwest by the river Vechte, which farther downstream flows into the Netherlands. The town's highest point rises to 48 m above sea level. Schüttorf lies in the foothills of the Bentheimer Berg, a great sandstone formation from the Cretaceous rising to 80 m and a wooded western outlier of the Teutoburg Forest. Only a small piece of the Bentheim Forest is in the town. All together, roughly 89 ha of woodland is found within the town, making up 8% of the town's total land area.

North of the town is found a former heathland, which sees mainly agronomic use nowadays. There were still broad heathlands in the town just before the First World War. The last heath was converted to agricultural land in 1993. A peculiarity was the dune area in Schüttorf, which consisted of windblown sand, but this was quarried and exploited in the mid-20th century. The outlying centre where these dunes were is, however, still popularly called “Marokko” or, in Low German, Witten Over (“White Shore”), referring to the area's “desertlike” appearance.

There are quite a number of open areas around the town, mainly used for agriculture. Residential areas are characterized by one-family dwellings. There are no genuine highrises in town. With the completion of the Schüttorfer Kreuz (“Schüttorf Cross”), an Autobahn cloverleaf formed by the A 30 and the A 31, greater commercial and industrial areas were laid out in the town's northeast near this interchange in 2004 and 2005.

A beautiful floodplain landscape is the Große Maate northwest of town. In this lowland area by the Vechte are many pools replenished over and over again by flooding. Many butterfly and other insect species are found here, and also the rare kingfisher. The Holmer Maate is another of Schüttorf's floodplain landscapes, where lapwings and great crested grebes may be spotted. Near the centre is the Vechteniederung Recreation Area, which is a floodplain and contains stormwater basins.

Land use
Use	Area in ha
residential	242
commercial-industrial	100
recreation	52
transport	135
agriculture	382

=== Neighbouring communities ===
The town of Schüttorf mainly borders on other members of the Joint Community, namely Samern in the southeast, Quendorf in the northwest and Engden in the north. Within the district of Grafschaft Bentheim, Schüttorf borders on the town of Bad Bentheim in the west. In the east, the town limit is also part of the boundary with the neighbouring district of Emsland, bordering there on Ahlde, an outlying centre of the community of Emsbüren. There is found – only 2 km from Schüttorf – a noteworthy, small conservation area with a heath pond.

=== Environmental classification ===
Environmental areas, or units, within the municipal area can be broken down thus according to mainly geomorphological and geological criteria, and soil science (see 1):

- D30 Dümm Geest Lowland and Ems-Hunte-Geest
  - Nordhorn-Bentheim Sand Area – with subunits:
    - Nordhorn-Engden Moor- and Sand Landscape
    - (Middle) Vechte Lowland/Nordhorn Lowland
- D34 Münsterland (Westphalian) Depression
  - Westmünsterland – with subunit:
    - Bentheim Forest

The town of Schüttorf lies mainly on valley sand plates which are crossed by the Vechte Lowland, which is almost flush with them along this stretch. The lowland lies roughly 30 m above sea level and is from 200 to 500 m wide. Bordering its edges are river terraces with a height of roughly 35 m above sea level. Owing to the slight difference in elevation even within the river valley, the middle Vechte meandered in the past, leading to the formation of many backwaters. Since then, however, the river has been straightened and is kept at Schüttorf level.

=== Geology and local soil science conditions ===
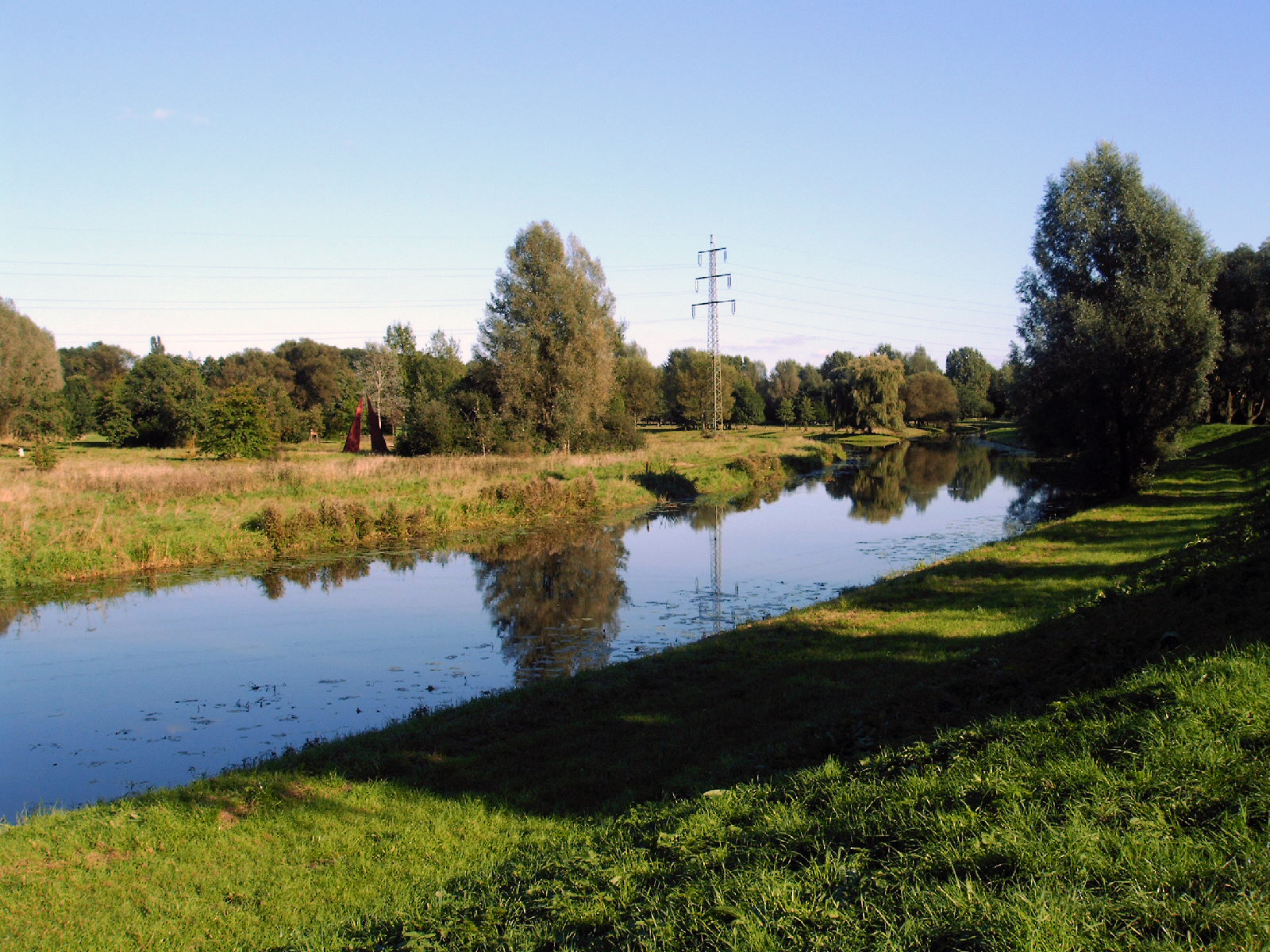
Backwater on the Vechte near Schüttorf

Climate diagram for Schüttorf

The Vechte Lowland is part of the Nordhorn glacial terminal basin, which was filled during the Saalian Stage by a glacier. This same glacier also pushed up the terminal moraine that is now the Uelsen Hills and the Lingen Heights in today's Grafschaft Bentheim and Emsland. In the south, the glacier found its abutment at the Mesozoic Bentheim Cretaceous Sandstone Mountain Chain. During the last ice age, the terminal basin was filled with fluvial sand, and locally, sand dunes were blown up by the wind. Within the Vechte Valley, the river deposited Holocene – that is, post-ice-age – sands and floodplain loam.

The mainly sandy, partly loamy or moory soils of the valley sand plates and the narrow river floodplain are relatively sparse in soil quality, ranking between 11 and 30 on the scale used in Germany (which goes up to 100). The outliers of the Bentheim Hill are made up of Bentheim sandstone, a sandstone from the Early Cretaceous. These heights are the northwesternmost outposts of the Central European Uplands. Towards the surface are, as a general rule, clayey soils and till loam. The clay is also used by industry, such as at the brickyard in Suddendorf.

=== Climate ===
Schüttorf lies in the Mid-European Temperate Zone. The average yearly temperature is 8.5 °C, the mean air pressure is 1015.2 hPa and the mean yearly precipitation amounts to between 700 and 800 mm. The climate is Subatlantic with rather mild winters and fairly warm summers. In Schüttorf itself, there is no weather station run by the German Weather Service (Deutscher Wetterdienst). The nearest weather station is Nordhorn, whose weather is not notably different from Schüttorf's.

Lower Saxony's state hydrological service maintains a water quality monitoring station in Samern where the Vechte's water levels and water quality are measured and documented.

== Population ==
Schüttorf's population development (1945 - 1950) The population grew with the arrival of people driven out of the eastern territories

Schüttorf's population growth (1987 - 2005)

Schüttorf has 11,711 inhabitants (as of 18 April 2005) in an area of 11.23 km^{2}, 51.3% of whom are female. The town's population density is 1027/km^{2}.

Evangelical-Reformed Christians account for 40.7% of the town's population, whereas 22.1% are Catholic, 14.9% are Lutheran and 22% either hold no religious beliefs or belong to other faiths. There are 942 foreigners (8%) living in Schüttorf, among whom the biggest group is Turkish nationals (448), and the second-biggest Dutch nationals (187). There are 1,894 people (16.2%) living in Schüttorf who are German nationals, but whose background is foreign (as of 1 January 2006).

=== Population development ===
The first population count for Schüttorf is yielded by a document from Claus von Tecklenburg from the year 1399, which clearly speaks of a total of 350 persons. What is known from this is that in 1399, Schüttorf had at least 52 townsmen, as they are named in the document. However, it seems unlikely that there were considerably more. Going by average family size, it seems likelier that at this time, the population was actually somewhere between 200 and 250 inhabitants in the town. Thereafter, the town's population climbed continuously, a trend interrupted only by the Second World War.

There were three great surges in the population growth. The first came in the late 19th century, especially in the 1890s while the textile industry boom due to the Industrial Revolution was luring workers to Schüttorf. After the Second World War came the second wave of immigration when roughly 2,600 refugees driven out of Germany's former eastern territories reached Schüttorf. Towards the end of the 1990s, the population once again rose sharply owing mainly to locally favourable building land prices.

Year	Inhabitants
1399	~250
1788	963
1820	1,041
1830	1,373
1841	1,453
1860	1,703
1871	1,682
1890	1,994
1900	4,110

Year	Inhabitants
1939	5548
1945	4953
1946	6769
1957	7982
1972	9479
1987	9,550
1997	11,222
2005	11,711
2007	11,753

== History ==
Schüttorf's town hall was struck by an aerial bomb in 1945 in the Second World War's last days and was completely gutted. The fire also destroyed the town archive and many valuable historical documents, making research into Schüttorf's history very difficult. Many things, however, have been reconstructed since then.

=== Etymology ===
The etymology of the name Schüttorf is not exactly known and various folk explanations have been put forth, the most widespread of which is the legend that tells of the river Vechte being diverted around the town as early as 1295 by building a dam. The workers on this project are said to have dumped out the contents of their pushcarts on the command Schütt’t d’r up. This legend, however, only explains the sound of one of the town's modern names (the Low German name Schüttrupp).

The earliest forms of the name Schüttorf were Scuhtthorp, Scutorpe, Scuttorpe and Scotdorpe in documents from 1154. On a coin issue from the first half of the 13th century is the form SCOTOR(p)E.

Hermann Abels (see 2) is of the opinion that the name's origin is the Dutch word schut (limber wall, dam, sluice), which comes close to the folk meaning. Historically, however, it comes up short, as it assumes that the Vechte was already dammed at the time the placename arose, and it leaves unexplained all forms in Scot-, which must be derived from the Low German Schott (“dividing wall in a stall”).

Another explanation has the name coming from the Vechteschuten, barges (Schuten) being the flat-bottomed boats with a very small draught that were used for shipping Bentheim sandstone. The Vechte is navigable by barge as far up as Schüttorf, and it is known that the stone was loaded here. This explanation, however, presupposes intensive river shipping at the time of the town's founding.

Quite another explanation is that the name Schüttorf stems from Scutthorpe or Scuttrop, which means “Protection Village” (this would be Schutzdorf in Modern High German), referring to Altena Castle in the town. Historically, however, this explanation also does not bear up under scrutiny, for the castle was not built until well after the town's founding.

A modern explanation says that the placename comes from the Low German Scuit (“Irishman”). Ireland’s mediaeval name was Scoti or Scotti. In Gaelic there are many dialects containing and illustrating the vowel variants o and u. Furthermore, finds at digs around Schüttorf of Celtic crosses and fan crosses show that there were once Irish monks in the area.

=== Early history ===
During excavation work for a railway line, a woman’s thighbone was unearthed in Schüttorf reckoned to date from roughly 2000 BC. Schüttorf must therefore have already been settled by that time. The cromlechs in nearby Emsbüren were also built at about this time. Also, a clay pot found in 1927 comes from this same era.

Already very early on, there was an important crossing of two trade routes on the site that is now Schüttorf, as the river Vechte could be crossed here at a ford. At this hub was an “original yard” around which the settlement developed and which existed until 1792 as the Alter Hof (“Old Yard”).

In the 6th or 7th century missionaries from the British Isles came to Schüttorf. At archaeological digs, Irish Celtic crosses, for instance, have been found. The naming of Schüttorf's outlying centre of Schottbrink, whose existence can be proved by the 15th century, bears further witness to an Irish presence in the area.

In the 8th and 9th centuries, farmers from the Calais and Boulogne area came and settled in Schüttorf to further Christianization. Even today many families still bear names that come from villages in that region, such as Hermeling from Hermelinghen, Hummert from Humbert or Wanning from Maninghen (see 3).

=== Town rights ===
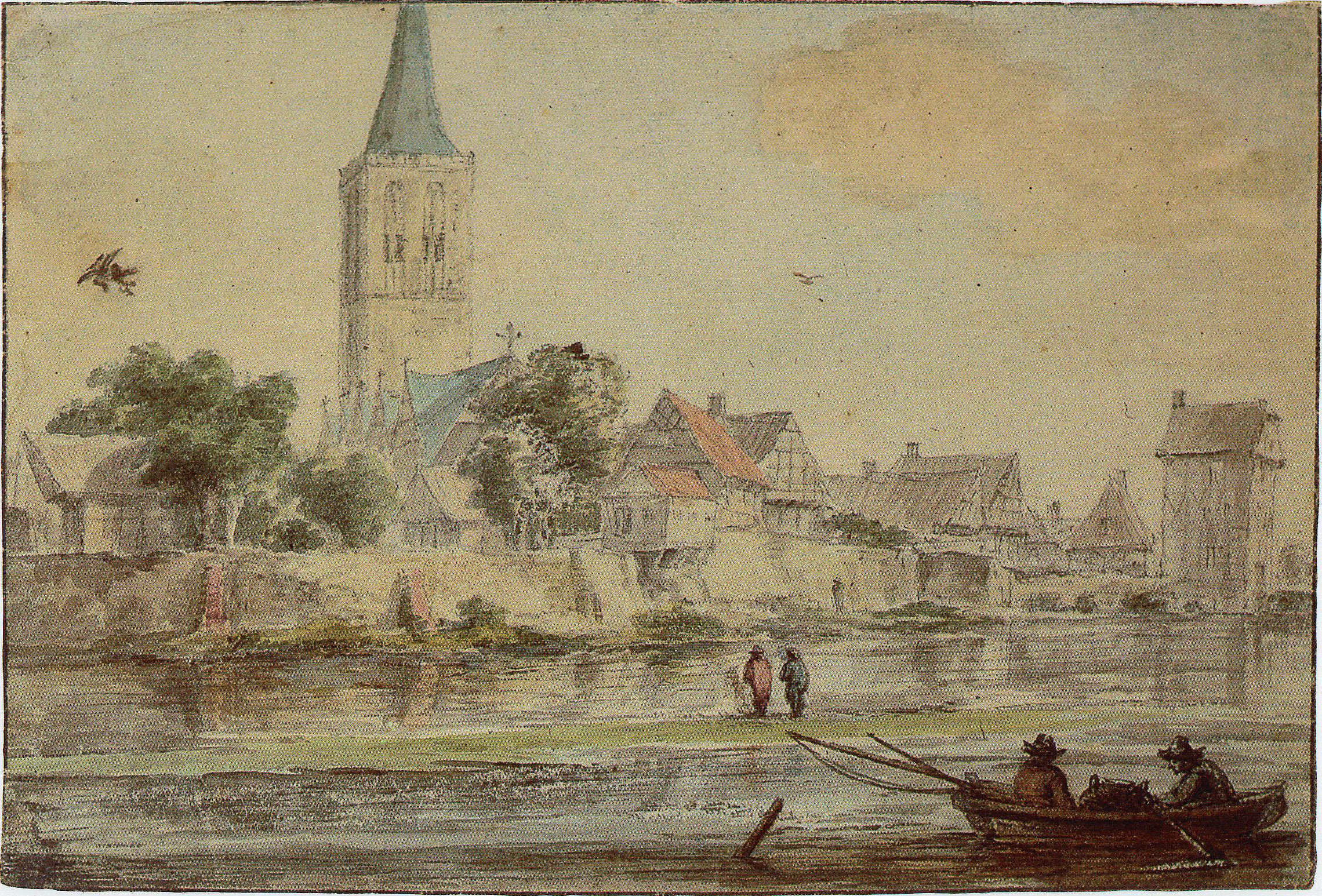
Jacob Isaakszoon van Ruisdael: View of the Town of Schüttorf from the East, about 1650

Schüttorf had its first documentary mention in 1154, in the curtis Scutthorp, as an estate belonging to the Counts at Bentheim. Town rights were granted Schüttorf on 6 November 1295, the Sunday after All Hallows, by Count Egbert at Bentheim. The document witnessing this has been preserved and is now found at the Fürstlich Bentheimschen Archiv in Burgsteinfurt. This makes Schüttorf Grafschaft Bentheim's oldest town. It is known, however, that before the founding there were a count's main court and an ecclesiastical centre for the Upper County here. In 1295 there were only two other towns within 30 km of Schüttorf: Horstmar and Oldenzaal, making the new town into an important market and shipping place, and Schüttorf became a member of the Hanse. The town rights contained in particular six rights to which townsmen were entitled. Namely these were:

- tax exemption;
- a share of the court's proceeds (two-thirds of all taxes and fines);
- free inheritance right;
- acquisition of freedom after one year and six weeks;
- tax freedom for dealers in wood and peat;
- all rights enjoyed by the Münster townsmen.

Beyond these six rights, there are a great many special conditions for the so-called Wicbeldeslude (this would be Weichbildleute in Modern High German) – or people from the outlying countryside – which indeed make up the bulk of the document. These people were inhabitants of the town who were subject to a special right, but they were not townsmen. In 1297, Schüttorf was also given its own jurisdiction by Count Bernd in the coram judico nostro Scottorpe.

The town's inner political organization was left up to the townsmen. Quickly, a ruling class of traders and craftsmen arose. New townsmen were always invested on St. Peter's Day (22 January), and even unwed women had the right to become townswomen. Until 1555, townsmen were obliged yearly to pay the Bürgergewinnungsgeld (“townsman’s recovery tax”), which cost them each five Taler, roughly matching the price of a fat ox and a calf. To put this into perspective, a master mason earned roughly six Schilling a day, meaning that he had to work for three and a half days to earn a Taler. Alternatively it was also possible to pay a considerably lower inhabitant tax, but this brought with it no townsman's rights. Many inhabitants chose this thriftier alternative. To be allowed to live within the town's walls, it was a requirement for townsmen and other inhabitants alike to swear an oath of loyalty to the town of Schüttorf. Until 1719, all fully grown townsmen had the right to vote for town councillors, but thereafter only fully grown married men who were citizens were allowed to vote.

In 1465, Count Everwyn at Bentheim once again renewed and expanded the town rights. The document witnessing this no longer exists, having been lost in the town hall fire in 1945. The new town rights were subdivided into 49 sections and dated in perpetuity. The town rights were subsequently affirmed and expanded by each Count. From 1589, however, relations between the Count's court in Bentheim under Count Arnold and the town were souring. In this year, the Count even had the town's mayor imprisoned, releasing him only after the payment of 100 golden guilders and a hogshead (actually described as 1 1/2 barrels) of wine. The situation thereafter steadily escalated. In 1645, Count Ernst Wilhelm refused to renew the town rights. Instead, he had the town's mayor imprisoned for 38 weeks and then banished him. After this, the townsmen appealed to the Imperial Court in Vienna. This grievance is still preserved there. Ernst Wilhelm on the other hand petitioned the Reichshofrat for the cassation of the town rights. The conflict further escalated when in 1668 the House of the Counts at Bentheim converted to Catholicism while Schüttorf remained Reformed. When Ernst Wilhelm abdicated in 1693, the town refused to render homage to his son, Arnold Maruk, although in the end it was forced to do so.

=== Taxes ===
Even though the town of Schüttorf was entitled to full tax freedom in the town rights of 1295, it says in the town rights of 1465: “unse Stadt und Börger [...] nicht beschwehren mitt ungewohnliche Schattinge” (“not burden our town and townsmen with unusual taxes”). So, of course, taxes were imposed. At first, taxes were levied by head of cattle owned, but as of 1638 also for each hearth. Special taxes were levied in the 15th century for the war against the Hussites, and again in the 16th century to prevent the danger from the Turks and to fight the Anabaptists. Towards the end of the 17th century, war contributions rose, and there were even foreign troops stationed in Schüttorf, leading to a grave financial emergency in the town. In 1682, the Count of Bentheim even felt himself forced to gather in taxes with the troops’ help.

=== Town fortification ===
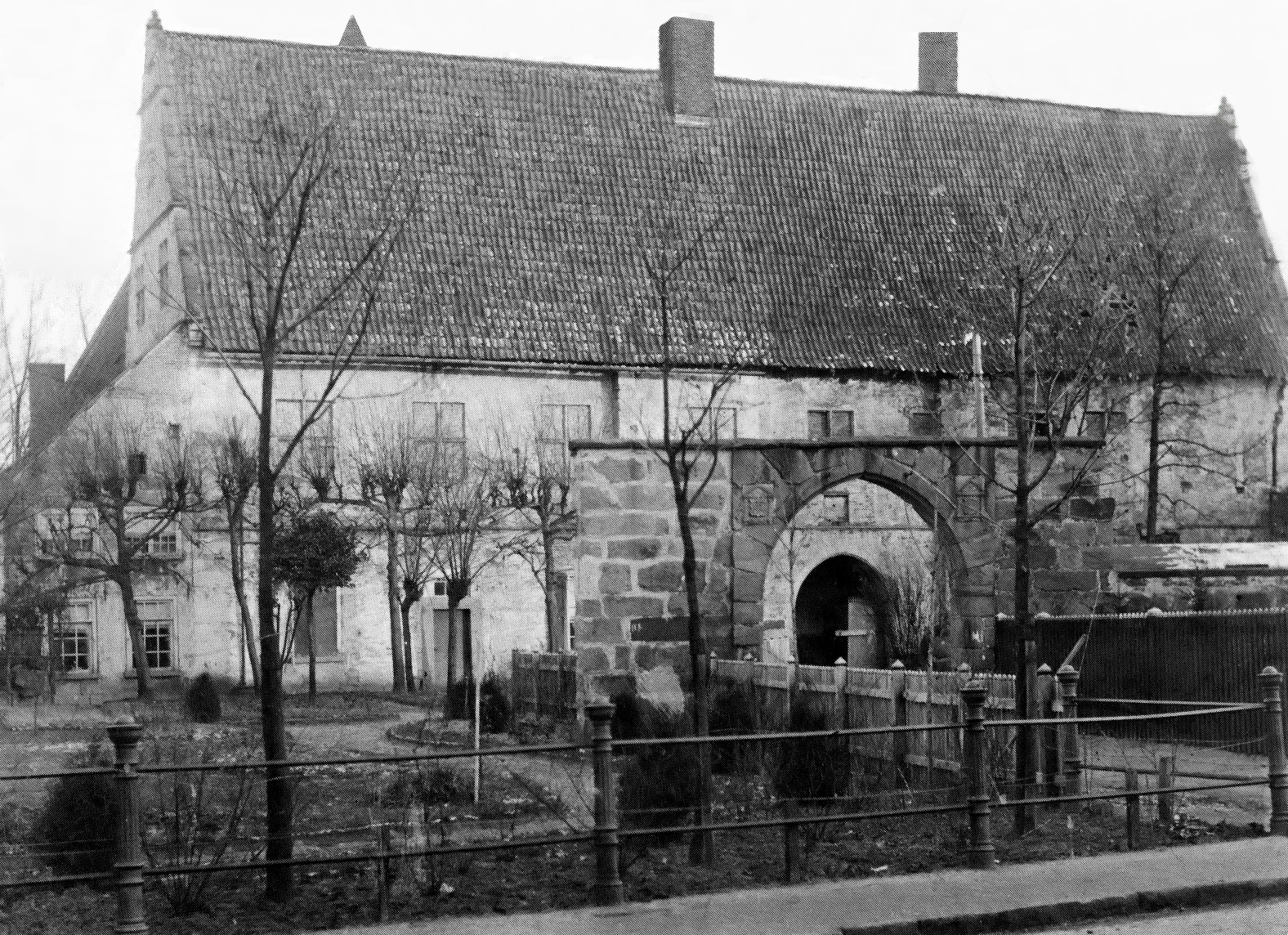
Altena Castle's west side with gate arch, late 19th century

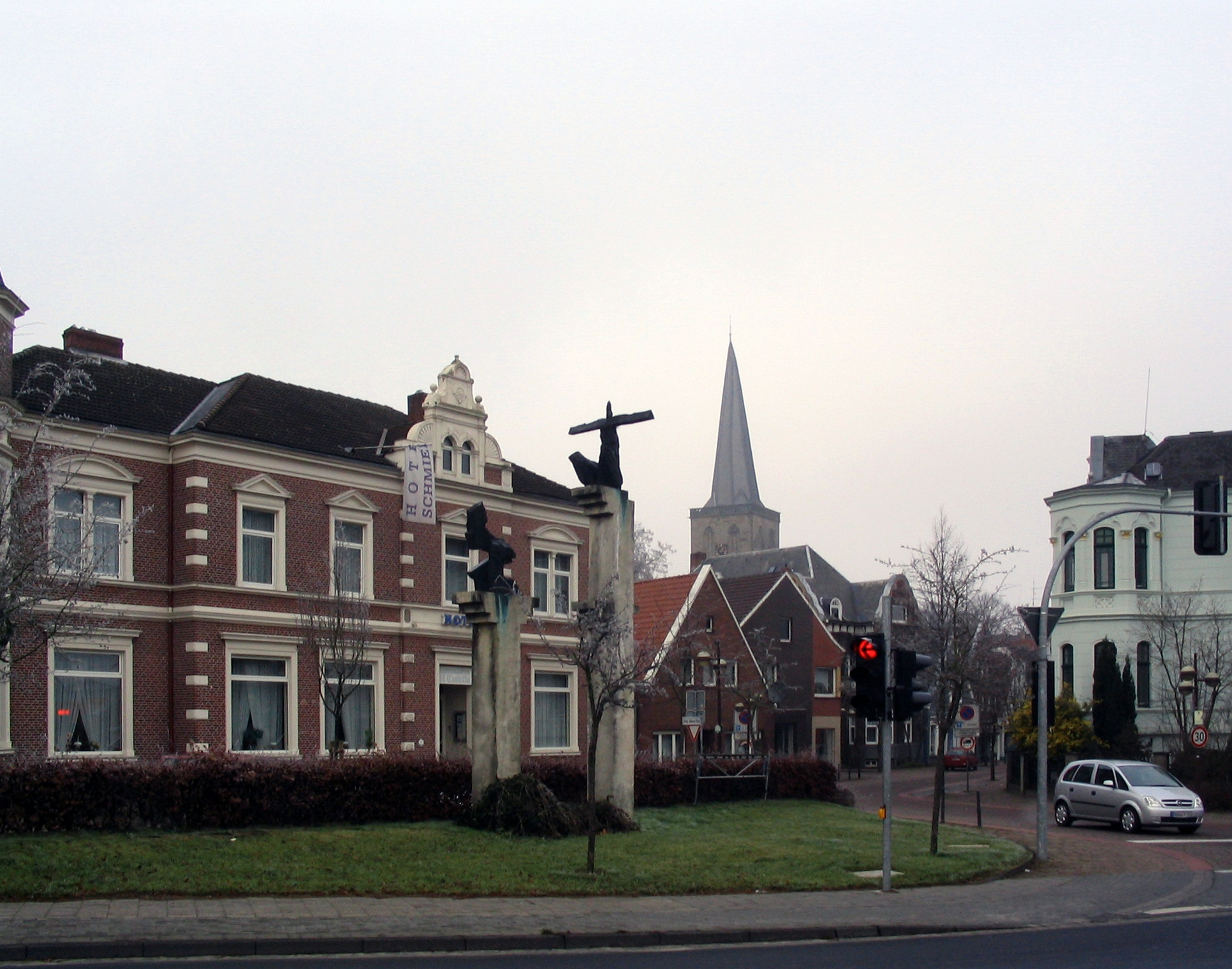
Today's Burg-Altena-Platz – without Altena Castle

Right after town rights were granted, work began on fortifying the town, which involved building a 1 400 m-long town wall enclosing an area of 15 ha. Roughly 30 000 m^{3} of Bentheim sandstone was quarried and brought to town by oxcart to build the wall. By the late 14th century, Schüttorf was girt by a strong defence system that had at its disposal three town gates:

- The Voeporte (completed 1424): The Föhntor
- The Steenporte (completed 1392): The Steintor
- The Wyneporte (completed 1379): The Windtor

To fortify the town further, Altena Castle (Burg Altena) was built, being completed in the first half of the 14th century. Then, in 1560, the castle became the widow's seat of the House of the Counts at Bentheim. As of the 17th century, the castle was gradually sinking into oblivion, slowly falling into ruins that, over the townsfolk's loud protests, were eventually torn down in 1975 to make way for a thoroughfare. Parts of the town's old wall are preserved in the southwest Old Town (Altstadt).

Burg Altena is not to be confused with the castle in Altena, which bears the same name, but which still stands today.

=== Guilds ===
In 1341, Count Simon at Bentheim recognized Schüttorf's first guild, namely de Schomackere Amte (shoemakers), leading to the conclusion that this profession was particularly widespread. In 1362, Count Otto recognized the wall builders’ and cabinetmakers’ guilds, and finally in 1387, Count Bernhard recognized the smiths’ guild. In 1465, in the new town rights, these were still the only guilds mentioned, and no others. To be allowed to practise one of these professions it was a requirement to be a Schüttorf townsman, and also to have “won over” that profession's guild. This entailed considerable material benefits.

Already quite early on, there was welfare in Schüttorf. The Heiliger Geist Stiftung (“Holy Ghost Foundation”) had its first documentary mention in 1379, when Count Bernhard gave the Foundation a plot of land free of charge on which to build an almshouse. The Foundation supplied poor and elderly townsfolk with clothing, and from 1384, the needy also got a yearly allowance of four Schilling. The Heiliger Geist Stiftung still exists today and is owned by the town. It has broadened its work into promoting youth.

=== Municipality and community ===
No sooner had French Foreign Minister Charles-Maurice de Talleyrand guaranteed the Count at Bentheim neutrality than Napoleon ignored it, annexing the County on 12 June 1806 to the Duchy of Berg. This was forthwith followed by marked encroachment upon Schüttorf's jurisdiction and the upcoming town council election. On 7 March 1809, the Interior Minister stripped Schüttorf of its town rights and instead created the municipality of Schüttorf out of the town itself and the outlying communities of Quendorf, Wengsel, Suddendorf and Neerlage. At the same time, a census was compiled, which found the town's population to be 1,040, and the municipality's 2,140. In 1810, the municipality was further enlarged by having the communities of Salzbergen, Hummeldorf and Steide added to it. In Napoleon's time, serfdom also came to an end in the region. In a decree about the “abolition of serfdom in the Grand Duchy of Berg” issued on 12 December 1808 by the Imperial camp at Madrid, Napoleon ordered that even the Colonen and serfs were to be granted all civil rights. In 1813, the French were driven out and Schüttorf was merged with the Kingdom of Hanover. There was a blanket invalidation of all French laws. However, a return to the old structures proved difficult.

On 15 May 1851, an order reached the town of Schüttorf from the Osnabrück Landdrostei for the town to conform to the new Hanoverian town system. This, however, would have required the town to have a professional mayor and a town police force, things that the town could then ill afford. Thus, Schüttorf was placed under the Hanoverian Landgemeindeordnung as a community (Gemeinde) – and thereby also under a royal Amt. The later mayor Dr. Scheurmann called this a dark chapter in Schüttorf town history. Even Hanover's annexation by Prussia and the founding of the Empire in 1871 changed nothing with regards to Schüttorf's status as a community.

=== The rise of industry ===
The decisive rôle in Schüttorf's industrialization was played by the textile industry. This was due, on the one hand, to textile manufacture from linen on handlooms having already been done here for centuries, and on the other hand to cottage industry being channelled into this field. In the 17th century, many Schüttorfers had been going each year to the wealthy Netherlands to improve their livelihoods by cutting peat, mowing or selling wares. With the onset of hard times in the Netherlands in the early 19th century, however, this source of income dwindled. A remedy was afforded by more intensive home weaving. About 1850, the Schlikker family already employed about 400 weavers, and a few years later the first factory building was built. In 1865, the Schümer family's dyeworks followed. In 1867, the first Schlikker und Söhne mechanically powered cotton loom went into operation. In 1881 came the cotton spinning works. What followed was an economic upswing and a skyrocketing population. At the turn of the 20th century, Schüttorf was said to be the town with the most millionaires in proportion to population. Nonetheless, the saturated textile manufacturers gradually withdrew from this business, as they could foresee an end to the boom, and they busied themselves instead as bankers and financiers in, for example, the expansion of the textile industry in neighbouring Nordhorn, which was quickly overtaking Schüttorf.

=== First World War and reinstatement of town rights ===
The First World War led to a standstill in the textile industry, which by this time had grown into the most important economic activity in town, but raw materials were no longer being delivered. Only one business avoided closure by making uniforms, which were important to waging a war. This led to extremely high joblessness, moving the community to resolve to cultivate at its own cost the heath surrounding Schüttorf, to give people something to do. However, this led to a heavy burden on the town's coffers. Owing to high inflation, Schüttorf was forced to issue token money and bread tokens.

After the war the community resolved to install a professional mayor as the first step back towards townhood. On 28 February 1924, the Berliner Dr. Franz Scheurmann was installed as Schüttorf's first full-time mayor, a fact officially recorded in a document. On 15 June 1924 came the decision that as of 1 July, Schüttorf would once more be constituted as a town. From that day, too, Schüttorf would also have its own police force. On 1 October 1924, the town founded a town savings bank to encourage the townsfolk to save after the inflation.

=== Third Reich and Second World War ===
In October 1942, Mayor Scheurmann was removed from office owing to serious differences with the local NSDAP leader Arnold Horstmeier and the NSDAP district leader Dr. Josef Ständer. He was succeeded by Arnold Horstmeier, who was appointed mayor, and who imposed on the outgoing mayor a restraining order forbidding him to speak or stay in Schüttorf. In Schüttorf there came great disputes between the state and the Reformed Church, as Pastor Friedrich Middendorf was a member of the Reichsbruderrat (“Reich Brotherly Council”) of the Confessing Church. Despite mass protests, he eventually had to leave the community after having a restraining order imposed on him forbidding him to stay in the region.

In Schüttorf, before the National Socialist régime came to power, there were three Jewish families, two of whom fled, and the other of whom was deported. Today, there are no Jews living in Schüttorf.

During the Allied air war on Germany, Schüttorf was repeatedly bombed, not as a primary target, however. When Allied fliers had not used all their bombs on their mission, it was common practice simply to dump the unused ones anywhere before leaving Germany. Schüttorf was unlucky enough to be chosen as the dumping ground several times. On 3 April 1945, after the Allies had taken Bad Bentheim (then still Bentheim), they supposed that strong German forces were lying in wait in Schüttorf, and so they shelled the town heavily, with bomber squadrons also dropping phosphorus incendiary bombs. This brought about the utter destruction of 15 houses. A further 25 were heavily damaged, and roughly 600 lightly damaged.

The German paratroopers who had been stationed in Schüttorf had withdrawn already anyway, to Lingen, blowing up all bridges on the Vechte and wrecking the electrical and telephone systems as they went. On 4 April 1945, the town hall was struck by an aerial bomb and burnt, along with the town's archive. The next day, Schüttorf was liberated by British troops. All together, Schüttorf counted 222 dead, eight civilians had been killed in bombings and shellings, and 114 inhabitants were said to be missing.

The British military government installed Bernhard Verwold as honorary mayor in April 1945 until the townsfolk could once again elect a mayor themselves. This they eventually did, and on 25 January 1946 they returned the later honorary citizen Dr. Franz Scheurmann to the mayor's office. In 1960, he was awarded the Bundesverdienstkreuz. (see 4)

One Nazi opponent was Friedrich Middendorff, who was made pastor of the Evangelical-Reformed parish in Schüttorf in 1926. Even before the Machtergreifung, he had been openly disagreeing with National Socialist Ideology in the Deutsches Allgemeines Sonntagsblatt, and he was also known through his work in the Christlich-Sozialer Volksdienst, and he quickly became a target for the Nazis. What followed was surveillance by the Gestapo and state reprisals. The disagreement reached its apex on 18 April 1937 when several hundred Schüttorfers gathered before the town hall after Middendorff had been arrested and “sang him free”, standing there for hours singing chorales until he was released. His article Ein Weniges zur Judenfrage (“A Little About the Jewish Question”), which was seized and banned, had become well known. Middendorff had to flee town in 1937, and so did his family the following year. Only after the war, when the Third Reich had been defeated, in 1946, did he come back to Schüttorf. He later held many offices, and became from 1946 to 1953 the ecclesiastical president of the Evangelical-Reformed Church. Later he was the lead candidate for the DFU in the Lower Saxony elections. In 1973, however, he lost his life in a traffic accident. A square in Schüttorf, Friedrich-Middendorff-Platz, is named after him. (see 5)

== Religion ==
=== Religious history ===
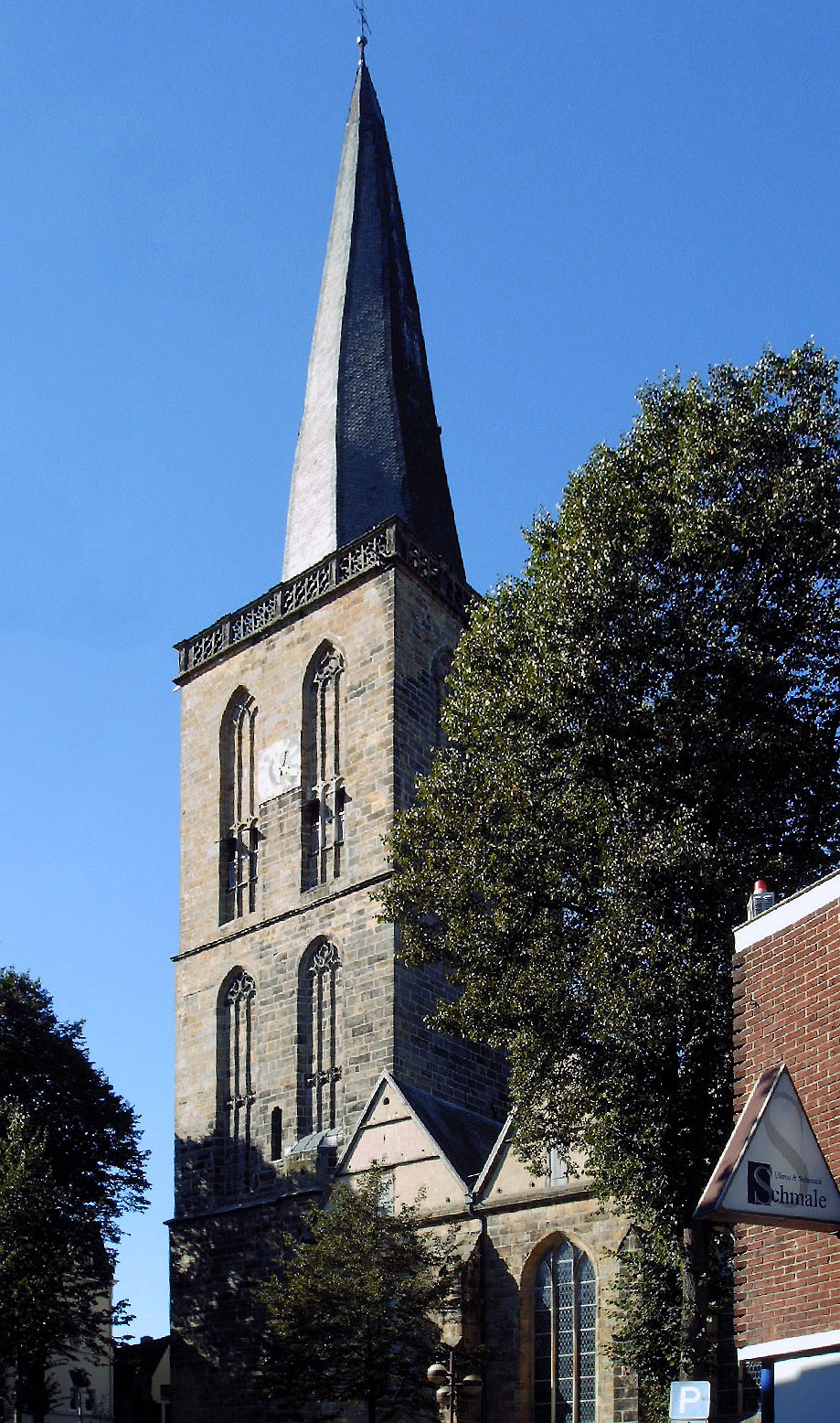
Town of Schüttorf Reformed Church

In 1209, a church consecrated to Saint Lawrence in Schüttorf was mentioned in a document for the first time. In 1544, Count Arnold converted to the Lutheran faith, and along with him the whole County. In 1588, the County became Evangelical-Reformed and thereby Calvinist. Even today, most Schüttorfers are Evangelical-Reformed. From 1598 to 1599, however, Schüttorf was occupied by Spanish troops and Reformed services were banned on penalty. In 1629, a convent was founded in Schüttorf. It stood at first under the Beguines’ care, but was later transferred to the Augustinians. In 1843, the convent was torn down.

=== Churches ===
Schüttorf has at its disposal six houses of God. The most striking is the Evangelical-Reformed Church of Saint Lawrence (Kirche St. Laurentius), also known as große Kirche (“Big Church”) or Schüttorfer Riese (“Schüttorf Giant”). This church is a three-naved hall church built in the Gothic style with four bays, a transept and a polygonal choir. It also once served as the burying place for the Bentheim Counts.

The nave was built in stages. The oldest part likely dates from 1355 and consists of a one-naved, cross-shaped building with today's fourth bay as the crossing and today's crossing as the choir, as well as the second and third bays and the fourth bay's side nave. The tower stood on the spot where today the first bay stands. In the fourth bay's north side nave is found a fresco-secco painting from the 14th century. Bit by bit, the bays were widened with side naves. The nave was likely only joined to the tower after that was finished.

The church's overall length is 54 m and its breadth 19 m. The tower is 81.17 m high and can be seen from anywhere in Schüttorf. This church had its first documentary mention in 1355 when an indulgence letter for its construction was sold; in 1390, it was expanded. Building work on the choir in today's building began on the Thursday after Corpus Christi in 1477. It was finished on Christmas Eve 1478. Work on the nave began in 1500, while work continued on the square west tower, which had an eight-sided pyramidal cupola, until 1535. This tower burnt six times, however, in 1684, 1703, 1799, 1817 (twice in as many days) and 1889 after being struck by lightning. A legend has it that the last tower fire on 8 February 1889 was quenched with milk, which in the fire's heat quickly dried and formed a crust, smothering the fire. The original bells for the tower came from the years 1502 and 1772; however, in 1917, these bells had to be handed over and melted down for war requirements. Today there are six bells hanging in the tower, among them an old firebell from 1435 that was spared in 1917. The church's organ is a two-manualled instrument with tin pipes. it was built in 1963 by the Swiss organ-building business Th. Kuhn.

The Catholic Church of Mary (Marienkirche) was built in 1868. It contains a sandstone Madonna from the late 16th century. Before this church was built, Schüttorf's Catholics had to make do with the chapel at Altena Castle. After the Second World War, there first came a New Apostolic church and in 1955 the Lutheran church. The Lutheran church has been called Christophorus-Kirche (“St. Christopher’s Church”) since 1992. In this same year, a small mosque was founded in an old workshop. Since 2004 there has also been a House of God for the Free Christian community. Furthermore, Schüttorf has, besides an Evangelical and a Catholic, also an old Jewish cemetery.

== Politics ==
=== Joint Community ===
When Lower Saxony was founded in 1946, Schüttorf became part of this Bundesland. On 14 December 1970 the Joint Community (Samtgemeinde) of Schüttorf was founded. This at first consisted of nine communities, the town of Schüttorf itself and the communities of Engden, Drievorden, Neerlage, Wengsel, Ohne, Quendorf, Samern and Suddendorf. Later, the communities of Engden and Drievorden were merged into the community of Engden, and likewise the communities of Neerlage and Wengsel into the community of Isterberg, so that the Joint Community now consisted of seven communities. The Joint Community's work is to take charge of collective planning work, to promote tourism and to take charge of disposing of sewage and rubbish. Furthermore, adult education, the promotion and creation of cultural institutions and civil status functions also fall within its field of responsibility. The Joint Community is administered by the Samtgemeinderat (Joint Community council), the Samtgemeindeausschuss (Joint Community board) and the Samtgemeindebürgermeister (Joint Community mayor) and has its own seal.

Politics in Schüttorf is subdivided into the Joint Community administration and the town's own administration; so there is not only a Joint Community council but also a town council for Schüttorf itself. The Joint Community mayor and the mayor, moreover, are two different persons, and each of the other constituent communities in the Joint Community has its own mayor. The mayor's office also has at its side an unelected town director (Stadtdirektor). Until November 2006 the mayoralty was honorary, but it was then replaced with a full-time, professional position.

=== Town council and mayor ===
Seat apportionment

Seat apportionment on current Schüttorfer town council
Party/group	Seats
CDU	9
SPD	9
Bündnis 90/Die Grünen	2
FDP	1
Wählergemeinschaft Bürger für Bürger	1
Schüttorfer-Liste	1

On Schüttorf's town council, the SPD once traditionally held a majority; however, once an independent voters’ community was founded in September 1968, the SPD could no longer achieve an absolute majority. This situation still held true in 2006, since which time, when municipal elections were last held, Schüttorf has been governed by a “Jamaica coalition”. The current mayor is Thomas Michael Hamerlik (CDU) with two deputies: Claudia Middelberg (Bündnis 90/Die Grünen) and Jochen Vahl (FDP).

After Dr. Franz Scheurmann (see Third Reich and Second World War above) left office in 1949, he was followed by Johann Wenning (SPD) who held office until 1952, when Scheurmann (CDU) was reëlected, holding office until October 1956. After this, Johann Wenning was once again mayor until 1972. On 16 November of that year, Hermann Brinkmann (SPD) was elected, serving until 16 January 1989 when he was beaten by Karl-Heinrich Dreyer (SPD), who himself held office until 8 November 2006, when he was declared the town's “honorary mayor”. Shortly thereafter, he was awarded the Bundesverdienstkreuz for his achievements. His successor is Thomas M. Hamerlik (CDU).

List of Schüttorf's mayors
Mayor	Time
Dr Franz Scheurmann later (CDU)	28 February 1924 – October 1942; 25 January 1946 – 5 January 1949; 1952 – October 1956
Arnold Horstmeyer (NSDAP)	October 1942 – April 1945 (installed by NSDAP district leadership)
Bernhard Verwold	April 1945 – 25 January 1946 (installed by British military government)
Johann Wenning (SPD)	5 January 1949 – 1952; October 1956 – 16 October 1972
Hermann Brinkmann (SPD)	16 November 1972 – 14 November 1988
Karl-Heinz Dreyer (SPD)	16 January 1989 – 8 November 2006
Thomas Michael Hamerlik (CDU)	8 November 2006 – today

=== Coat of arms ===
The town's arms presumably came into being not long after Schüttorf was raised to town. Town privilege is not mentioned by any seal or coat of arms, the choice of arms having been left to the townsmen. The oldest preserved document showing Schüttorf's arms as a seal dates from 1315.

The coat of arms shows a stylized town gate with two towers between which is found Grafschaft Bentheim's arms. It is, however, not one of Schüttorf's town gates shown in the arms – the arms are older than the town gates – but rather the arms are meant to symbolize the town's status as such.

Schüttorf also has its own flag, which has two broad horizontal stripes and bears in the middle the town's arms in oval form.

=== Town partnerships ===
Schüttorf maintained until 2005 a town partnership with Vriezenveen (Twenterand) in the Netherlands, in the Twente region. This town partnership was part of the EUREGIO programme, a municipal league, to which roughly 140 German and Dutch towns, communities and districts belong. The EUREGIO league seeks to develop cross-border economic relations and fosters cultural exchange and German-Dutch school contacts. In 2005, Vriezenveen cancelled the town partnership, although Schüttorf remained part of EUREGIO. Dutch is an optional subject in Schüttorf's Realschule.

== Infrastructure and economy ==
=== Transport ===
==== Air transport ====
Schüttorf lies roughly a 50-minute drive away from the international Münster/Osnabrück Airport (FMO) in Greven. A regional airport is to be found 15 minutes’ drive away at Klausheide near Nordhorn.

==== Rail and bus transport ====
Schüttorf railway station lies on the Bad Bentheim–Minden railway line (KBS 375). There is local rail transport provided by the RB 61 on the Wiehengebirgs-Bahn (Bad Bentheim–Rheine–Osnabrück–Herford–Bielefeld).

In local road transport, buslines join Schüttorf with Nordhorn, Bad Bentheim, Ochtrup and the surrounding villages.

==== Roads ====
In Schüttorf's northeast is found the cloverleaf known as the Schüttorfer Kreuz where the Autobahnen A 30 (Bad Oeynhausen – Osnabrück – Hengelo) and A 31 (Emden – Oberhausen) cross each other.

=== Economy ===
Towards the end of the 19th century, a strong textile industry was developing itself in Schüttorf with several large local businesses (Schlikker & Söhne, Gathmann & Gerdemann, G. Schümer & Co. and ten Wolde, later Carl Rremy; today's RoFa is not one of the original textile companies, but was founded by H. Lammering and later taken over by Gerhard Schlikker jun., Levert Rost and Wilhelm Edel; the name RoFa comes from the postwar shareholders Rost and Falley). Moreover, a margarine factory (Wilhelm Edel & Co.) was also established. Schüttorf managed to do very well for itself from this industrialization, which was reflected in the population figures (1871: 1692 inhabitants, 1900: 4110). (see 6). In the textile industry crisis in the 1970s, the industry in Schüttorf, too, fell into crisis, and nowadays only the firms RoFa and G. Schümer GmbH & Co. still exist. As a result of this, joblessness rose, and the town's tax revenues fell.

After the Schüttorfer Kreuz was completed in December 2004, Schüttorf profited from its favourable transport location and its proximity to the Dutch border. Schüttorf had at this time laid out a big industrial area on the Autobahn and tried by fostering the economy to get businesses to locate there. The Joint Community's unemployment rate lay at 6.7% in May 2007, which was lower than the figure for Lower Saxony as a whole (8.5%), but higher than the figure for the district (6.1%).

==== Established businesses ====
One of the biggest business taxpayers in Schüttorf since 1971 has been the Swiss company Georg Utz GmbH with 280 employees. This enterprise maintains a plastics factory in which plastic palettes and containers are made. Similarly big is a corrugated cardboard factory run by the Prowell Group, which was completed in 2005 right on the cloverleaf. Stemmann-Technik GmbH, with its 320 employees, produces pantographs for the ICE and other trains, tramways and metros as well as further products for energy and data transfer in industry. Midsized businesses are Arnold Lammering GmbH & Co. KG, a steel wholesaler with roughly 100 employees, Mannebeck Landtechnik, which manufactures stable equipment and Kortmann Beton GmbH & Co. KG, which makes concrete parts and blocks. Until 2004, the town was also home to a lime sand brickworks, but this was closed and torn down. Schüttorf's favourable transport location encourages shippers to set up shop here. Five such companies have done so: Rigterink GmbH & Co. KG, Fiege net, SLK Kock internationale Spedition & Logistik GmbH, Euregio-Logistik GmbH and Wanning Spedition GmbH & Co. KG.

The best known company in Schüttorf, even far beyond the town, is the Danish company Tulip Food Company GmbH which processes meat and sausage products which are sold under this name in German supermarkets. Further companies known well beyond the town are the family business (since 1821) H. Klümper GmbH & Co. KG and Klüsta-Schinken Klümper & Stamme GmbH, which distribute ham specialities. The biggest service business in Schüttorf is the Index, a discotheque with 6000 to 7000 guests every weekend.

==== Town works ====
Schüttorf has at its disposal its own Stadtwerke Schüttorf GmbH – the town works – which is publicly owned. Already in 1896, a direct-current power station had been established on Fabrikstraße. From 1897, Schüttorf had electric street lighting, thus becoming one of the first towns in the German Empire to have it. In the same year, the lighting on Unter den Linden in Berlin was electrified. On 1 April 1909, the town bought the power station for 110,000 gold marks, and it has been owned by the town ever since. By 1955, the network switched from direct current to three-phase alternating current, and it stopped generating its own electricity. In 1928 and 1929, Schüttorf acquired a town watermain. From 28 December 1970, the town works also began supplying natural gas. Today, the two local swimming pools are also owned by the town works.

==== Medical institutions ====
On 17 October 1904, the manufacturer Hermann Schlikker endowed the town with 250,000 gold marks to build a hospital. The Krankenhaus Annaheim with 40 beds was opened in 1907. It was named after Schlikker's late wife. In the 1980s, a nursing home run by the Evangelical-Reformed church was made part of the hospital. The hospital, however, had never been solvent, and was closed in 1996. In the building arose a healthcare centre to which medical and physiotherapeutic practices also belong. Today, there are nine physicians, two veterinarians and six dentists in practice in Schüttorf.

== Culture and sightseeing ==
=== Schüttrupper Platt ===
In Schüttorf, Low German is traditionally spoken. For a few years now, people have been moved to preserve the local dialect, the Schüttrupper Platt. The Joint Community's homeland club (Heimatverein) for instance stages regular events under the title Wij kürt ock Platt. There is a Low German theatre group. At the primary school in German lessons, the local dialect is discussed and there also appear literature and newspaper articles in Low German.

=== Buildings ===
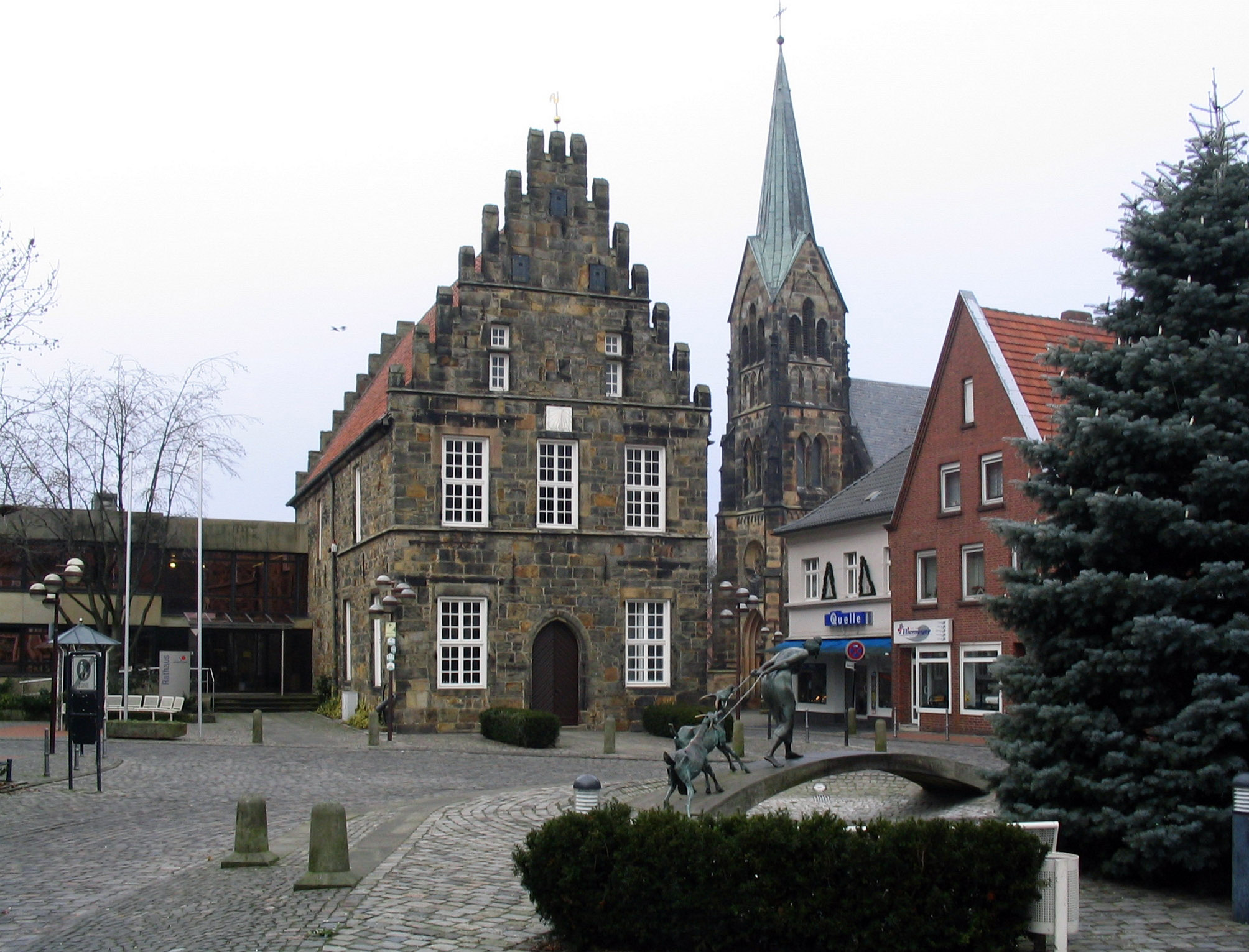
The marketplace with fountain, town hall and Catholic church

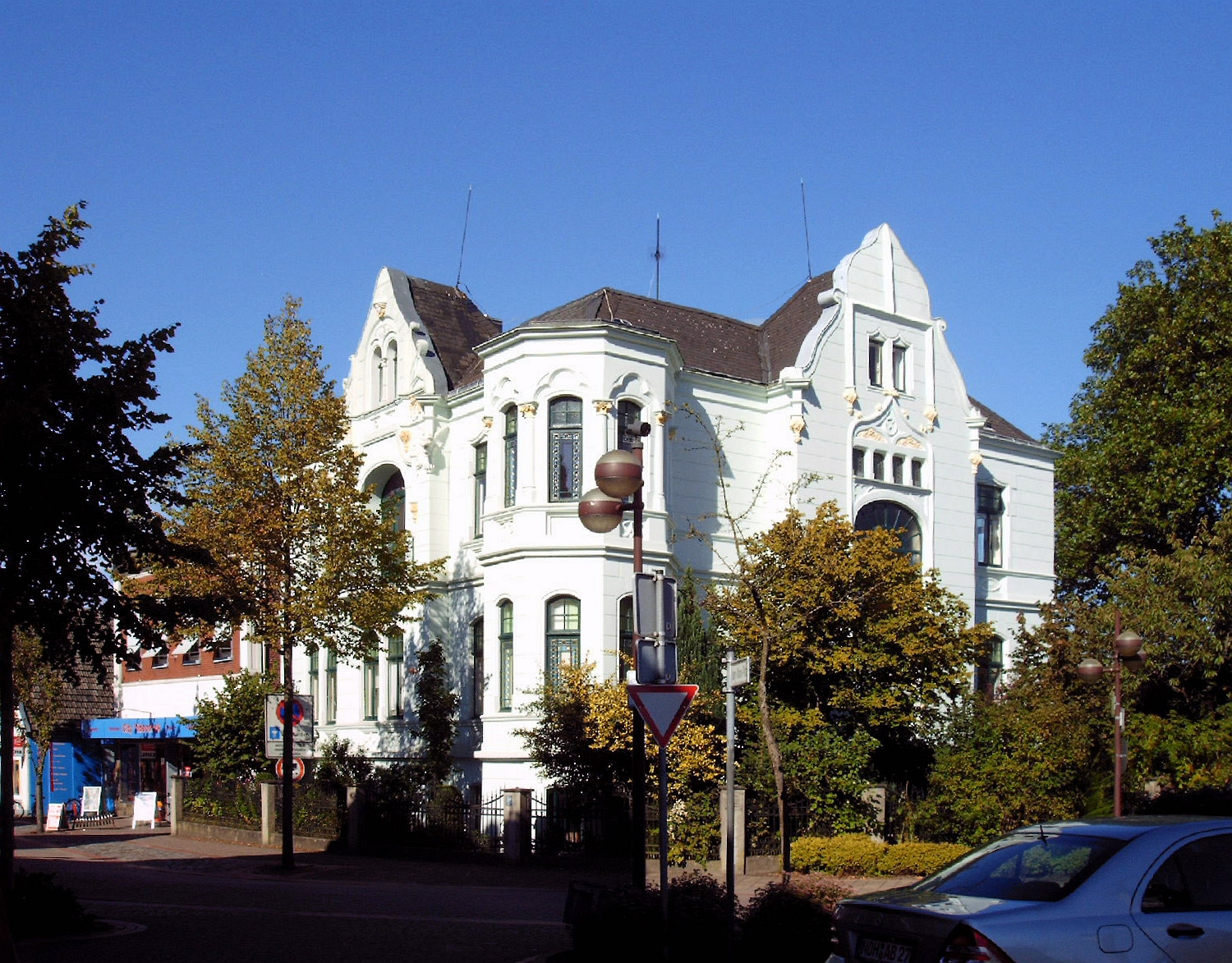
Villa Schlikker from 1903, Steinstraße

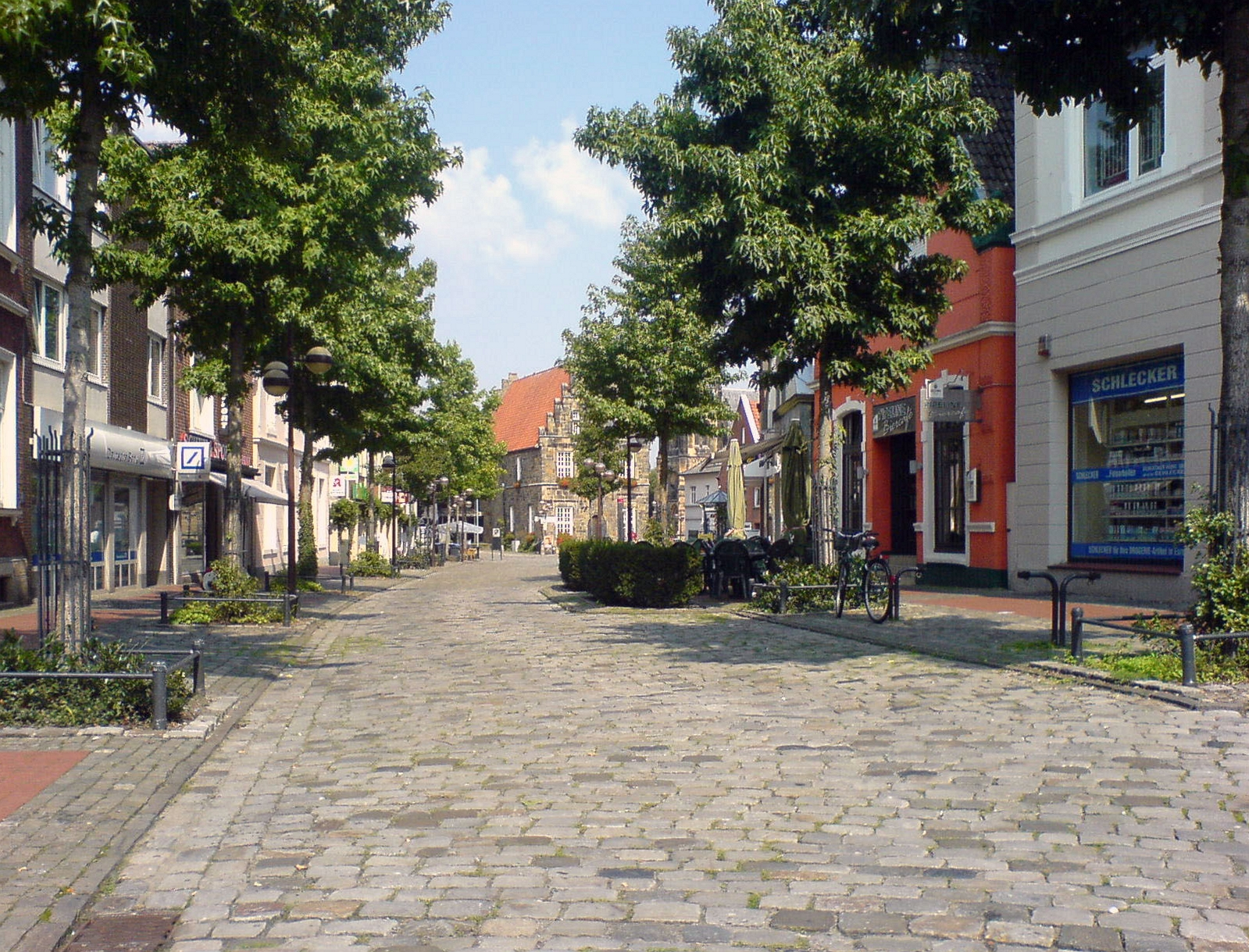
Schüttorf inner town

Besides the “Great Church” (the Evangelical-Reformed Church of Saint Lawrence), the Town Hall is particularly worth seeing. It is a two-story stone-block building made of Bentheim sandstone with crow-stepped gables from the 15th century, in which Schüttorf's ellwand is kept. This is a 68 cm-long metal bar which served for calibration. On the marketplace before the town hall is a bronze statue of a woman leading two goats. Right next door to the town hall stands the Catholic Church. Behind the church school is found the old Princely watermill from 1914. It is the only preserved mill of many that Schüttorf once had and it lies on a kolk pothole surrounded by old weeping willows.

Also in Schüttorf, there is a whole range of residential buildings that are worth seeing. Originally, one-story timber frame Dielenhäuser – houses with very high entrance halls – with gables towering over jetty bressummers, as are still commonly seen, for instance, in Quakenbrück, were the predominant type. In Schüttorf, however, the façades were not seldom massively remodelled. After demolitions, only a few older examples are still to be seen. Worthy of mention among them is the town pharmacy, which was originally made up of two forward-gabled single houses that were joined about 1750 with a false façade. The righthand part of the building dates from about 1645. A few older houses are still found on Steinstraße. Among these, house no. 7, which originally dates from the 17th century, is particularly worthy of mention. The façade was remodelled in 1827 in the Dutch Classicist style. On Singel (no. 1) stands a timber-frame Dielenhaus from about 1600. It is used nowadays as an inn.

Three villas are especially striking. The Villa Remy on Bentheimer Straße was built in 1906 in Baroque building master Johann Conrad Schlaun’s style, although he had been dead since 1773. The hipped mansard roof recalls the Baroque, while the façades are Classicist. Villa Rost on Lehmkuhle, also known nowadays as the “Blue Villa”, is a renovated villa from 1902. Villa Schlikker on Steinstraße was a gift from manufacturer Herman ten Wolde to his daughter Ida and his son-in-law in 1903. This house is a protected monument because of its rich Art Nouveau interior design.

=== Theatre ===
Schüttorf is home to the Theater der Obergrafschaft, which has existed since 1975. Here, performances are staged about twice every month. As well, famous artists are invited, and plays by Schüttorfers are rehearsed and performed. By 2006 there had been 350 performances all together with over 150,000 visitors.

=== Sport and leisure ===
In Schüttorf there are two public swimming pools, the Vechtebad, an indoor swimming pool, and an outdoor swimming pool, founded in 1935 and overhauled in 1997. Furthermore, there is also the Quendorfer See (lake) which affords bathing or swimming. The best known player in the FC's football division was Simon Cziommer, who now plays for AZ Alkmaar. A pure, if smaller, football club is SC Borussia 26 Schüttorf. TC Schüttorf 85 has its own tennis hall and tennis courts. The Reitsportgemeinschaft Schüttorf e.V. (horseback riding) conducts dressage and show jumping. Another big sport club is the Sportfischerverein Schüttorf e. V. (sport fishing) with roughly 760 members.

All together Schüttorf has four sport halls at its disposal, three sport fields, a riding hall, a tennis area, a playing field and nine children's playgrounds. Another popular kind of sport, especially in the colder months, is Kloatsheeten, which involves teams rolling a small wooden disk with a leaden core along roadways. There are many small private clubs, which can be seen, mostly in January, on the local roads playing the game.

Schüttorf also has its Unabhängiges Jugendzentrum KOMPLEX Schüttorf e.V. – independent youth centre – but despite the name, concerts are also staged there and there are various projects and work associations for young people. The YMCA (or CVJM in Germany) maintains a youth café in Schüttorf. There is a local fire brigade, and there is also a youth fire brigade. There are even three carrier pigeon breeding clubs in town, and other clubs for those who raise small animals. There are four glee clubs, five music clubs and a few other clubs and associations.

=== Regular events ===
An important nationally well known regular event was the Schüttorf Open Air. From 1980 to 1994 this open-air festival was held regularly every year on the Vechtewiesen (meadows) in Schüttorf. Well known bands were, for instance, Midnight Oil and Whitesnake. Also, Frank Zappa, Rod Stewart, the Simple Minds, David Bowie, BBM and Die Toten Hosen appeared in Schüttorf. Legendary was the appearance of Münster band Törner Stier Crew, who in 1982 outdid Frank Zappa onstage as the better opening band before 50,000 spectators. The town administration's and the building office's growing stricter requirements hindered the running of the festival. Once these became nearly impossible to fulfil, another festival was held in 1994 under the name Schüttorf Open Air near Bad Bentheim-Gildehaus. In 1995 there was then another Schüttorf Open Air near Gildehaus at which the Rolling Stones appeared. Since this time, the festival has no longer existed, and also an attempt to revive it in 2004 failed. Parallelling it, however, the Komplex Open Air in Schüttorf has been developed over the last few years, organized by the Komplex youth centre's Konzertinitiative Zikadumda. Thus far, renowned bands such as Blackmail and 4Lyn have played there, but local bands, too, can book appearances.

Furthermore, three yearly marksmanship festivals are held in Schüttorf by different shooting clubs – the Bürger-Schützenfest, the Gilde-Schützenfest and the Adler-Schützenfest. There are summer and autumn kermises. Since 1984, there has been a weekly market in Schüttorf

=== Culinary specialities ===
In Schüttorf, as in most rural areas in northern Germany, meals can be quite hefty. Widespread is self-prepared Hausmannskost (“plain fare”). The North's typical dishes are also eaten here, the most popular sidedish being potato.

One of Schüttorf's regional specialities is Kaneelkökskes, flat, round little cakes baked to a crisp in a waffle iron and with a light taste of cinnamon imparted by a small amount of cinnamon oil.

Schümers Korn (corn or grain), although it is baked in the neighbouring community of Salzbergen, can also be said to be a Schüttorf speciality. The Schümer distillery was at first located in the inner town, but at the Count's behest, it was not allowed to build its own mill, as the wind blowing over the land belonged to the Lord. Schümer moved just outside the community limit and ran his newly built mill nevertheless with “the Count’s wind”.

One custom practised in Schüttorf and the old County (now district) is the Weggenbringen. When a child is born to a family, the neighbours and friends bring a Weggen, a loaf of raisin bread that is often up to two metres long, and which is borne on a ladder. Traditionally, the Weggen was baked by the neighbours themselves and given as a Christening gift along with ham and cheese. After the Christening, it is then consumed. The clothing for this is the Holtbeus, a blue work jacket with black trousers, grey socks, wooden shoes, a top hat and a red neckerchief tied with a matchbox. Today, the Weggen is hardly ever brought anymore on the Friday before the Christening. Even when there is a Weggenbringen, it is not usually a Weggen with ham and cheese that is brought, but rather things like Bobbycars, child car seats and other useful articles.

=== Songs and verse ===
In the 1920s, the Schüttorf shoemaker Fritz Lübke composed a song for the town that quickly came to enjoy great popularity and was sung in Schüttorf. Today only older inhabitants still know the song, which Lübke gave the name Mein Schüttorf.

Durch der Grafschaft grüne Fluren,
Fließt der Vechte silbern’ Band.
Flüstert leis’ in alten Sagen,
Vom Gescheh’n an früheren Tagen,
Von daheim und Vaterland.

Ob vorbei die alten Zeiten,
Schüttorf bleibt sich ewig treu.
Arbeit schaffen fleiß’ge Hände,
Einig sind sich alle Stände,
Schätzend beides: Alt und Neu.

Mag's auch schön’re Städte geben,
Schüttorf ist mein Heimatort,
Nur für Schüttorf woll’n wir leben,
Seinem Wohl gilt unser Streben,
— Schüttorf, dauere immerfort! —

(Through the County’s green meadows,
Flows the Vechte’s silver band.
Whispers lightly in old legends,
Of events in earlier days,
Of home and Fatherland.)

(Whether the old times are past,
Schüttorf remains for ever true.
Work accomplish hardworking hands,
As one are all ranks,
Treasuring both: old and new.)

(Though there might be lovelier towns,
Schüttorf is my hometown,
Only for Schüttorf do we want to live,
Its well-being is our quest,
— Schüttorf, last evermore! —)

Also well known is the old poem Die gläserne Kutsche (“The Glass Coach”), which tells of a glass coach drawn every year on Saint John's Night through Schüttorf by three black, fire-snorting stallions.

De Wiewe, de fröger dat Labben nich löten,
de kwammen in de Glaskutsch met Handen und Vöten.
Tot Spott van Alle. In de Süntjannsnacht wörden se
döör de Stroaten van Schüttrup bracht.

(The women who could not leave the gossip,
Who came into the glass coach with hands and feet.
To everyone’s taunting. On Saint John’s Night they are
brought through the streets of Schüttorf.)

The town song is in High German, while “The Glass Coach” is in Low German.

== Education ==
In Schüttorf there are, besides the school kindergarten also a municipal kindergarten and two further ones under the Evangelical-Reformed Church's sponsorship and one more under the German Red Cross’s. There are three primary schools, a Hauptschule and a Realschule, and until 2004 there was also a middle school (Orientierungsstufe) but this was abolished by the state of Lower Saxony. The Hauptschule and Realschule have since 2006 been joined to the all-day school programme.

Schüttorf’s oldest school is the Kirchschule (“Church School”) or Evangelische Volksschule Schüttorf (“Schüttorf Evangelical Elementary School”) from 1608. The school founded then as a Latin grammar school had room for 200 pupils. In July 2007, the school moved into the former Hauptschule’s building. The old building has stood empty since then and is either to be made into flats for the elderly or to become a transregional museum building. Going back to a founding in 1712 is the Catholic community's Katholische Volksschule Schüttorf. It is today the town's smallest primary school with room for only 200 pupils. The biggest is the municipal school Grundschule auf dem Süsteresch founded in 1970.

In 1955, Schüttorf became home to the Erich-Kästner-Schule, a school for those with learning difficulties. The Hauptschule was founded in 1967, while the Realschule developed out of the elementary school. Young Schüttorfers who want to go to a Gymnasium can commute to one of the surrounding Gymnasien, in particular the Burg-Gymnasium Bad Bentheim, the municipal Gymnasium in Ochtrup, the Gymnasium Rheine or the private Missionsgymnasium St. Antonius in Bardel (see 9).

Since September 2007, Schüttorf has had its own school museum housed in the community centre (Bürgerhaus) near the former Church School.

== Famous people ==
=== Honorary citizens ===
Schüttorf's first, and thus far only, honorary citizen is the town's first full-time mayor, who was later also a Landrat for Grafschaft Bentheim, Franz Scheurmann (born 8 May 1892 in Berlin, died 3 October 1964 in Nordhorn), on whom this honour was bestowed on 8 May 1962. In May 1957, he had also been awarded the Bundesverdienstkreuz am Bande and since 1966, a square, Dr. Scheurmann-Platz in Schüttorf, has been named after him. Scheurmann set himself to work during his time in office above all for the town archive, bringing many old documents and historical papers together, which he published in many essays about Schüttorf (see 10).

=== Sons and daughters of the town ===
The following overview contains important personages born in Schüttorf, listed chronologically by birth year. Whether their later lives dealt with Schüttorf or not is not considered. The list does not profess to be complete.

- 1425, Johan van den Mynnesten, German-Dutch painter and copper engraver
- 1540, Wessel Schulte, Farmer from Neerlage, Forefather of the Pretorius Family in South Africa
- 1826, 13 December, Johann Hermann Julius Maekel, German portrait and landscape painter
- 1873 Georg Schümer (1873–1945), educator, writer, politician, member of the Landtag, peace activist
- 1912, 2 February, Hans Leussink, German Minister for Education and Science (1969–1972)
- 1980, 6 November, Simon Cziommer, German footballer
