= Schüttorf (Samtgemeinde) =

Samtgemeinde in Lower Saxony, Germany

- Samtgemeinde
- Coat of arms

- Location of Schüttorf within Bentheim district
- Interactive map of Schüttorf
- Location within Germany Location within Lower Saxony
- Coordinates: 52°19′N 7°14′E
- Country: Germany
- State: Lower Saxony
- District: Bentheim
- Seat: Schüttorf
- Subdivisions: 6 municipalities

Area
  - Total: 133.3 km^{2} (51.5 sq mi)

Population (2025-12-31)
  - Total: 16,644
  - Density: 124.9/km^{2} (323.4/sq mi)
- Time zone: UTC+01:00 (CET)
  - Summer (DST): UTC+02:00 (CEST)
- Website: www.schuettorf.de

Schüttorf is a Samtgemeinde ("collective municipality") in the district of the County of Bentheim, in Lower Saxony, Germany. Its seat is in the town Schüttorf.

The Samtgemeinde Schüttorf consists of the following municipalities:

- Engden
- Isterberg
- Ohne
- Quendorf
- Samern
- Schüttorf
