= Samern =

- Municipality
- Location of Samern within Grafschaft Bentheim district
- Interactive map of Samern
- Location within Germany Location within Lower Saxony
- Coordinates: 52°19′00″N 07°15′00″E
- Country: Germany
- State: Lower Saxony
- District: Grafschaft Bentheim
- Municipal assoc.: Schüttorf

Government
  - Mayor: Gerhard Schepers

Area
  - Total: 26.07 km^{2} (10.07 sq mi)
- Elevation: 36 m (118 ft)

Population (2025-12-31)
  - Total: 797
  - Density: 30.6/km^{2} (79.2/sq mi)
- Time zone: UTC+01:00 (CET)
  - Summer (DST): UTC+02:00 (CEST)
- Postal codes: 48465
- Dialling codes: 0 59 23
- Vehicle registration: NOH

Samern (German pronunciation: [ˈzaːmɐn]) is a community in the district of Grafschaft Bentheim in Lower Saxony, Germany.

== Geography ==
=== Location ===
Samern lies between Nordhorn and Steinfurt on the boundary with North Rhine-Westphalia. The community belongs to the Joint Community (Samtgemeinde) of Schüttorf whose administrative seat is in the like-named town.

== Culture and sightseeing ==
The Mansbrügge watchtower, or in the local speech the Piggetörnken, was once, according to local lore, a mint belonging to a count in the 14th century. Newer findings, however, show that this building was only ever used as a customs post.

=== Sport ===
Samern has a sport club, SV Suddendorf-Samern 1959 e.V.

== Economy and infrastructure ==
=== Transport ===
The Autobahn A 31 runs directly through the community of Samern.
