= Suddendorf =

- Ortsteil of Schüttorf
- Interactive map of Suddendorf
- Location within Germany Location within Lower Saxony
- Coordinates: 52°18′N 7°13′E
- Country: Germany
- State: Lower Saxony
- District: Grafschaft Bentheim
- Town: Schüttorf

Area
  - Total: 8.2 km^{2} (3.2 sq mi)
- Elevation: 34 m (112 ft)

Population (2010-12-31)
  - Total: 1,089
  - Density: 130/km^{2} (340/sq mi)
- Time zone: UTC+01:00 (CET)
  - Summer (DST): UTC+02:00 (CEST)
- Postal codes: 48465
- Dialling codes: 05923
- Vehicle registration: NOH
- Website: www.suddendorf.de

Suddendorf is a village and a former municipality in the district of Grafschaft Bentheim in Lower Saxony, Germany. Since 1 November 2011, it is part of the town Schüttorf.

== History ==
The name Suddendorf comes from the earlier form Zudendorpe, Zuden meaning “south” and dorpe – cognate with the English “thorpe” – meaning “village”. It was therefore descriptive of the village’s location south of Schüttorf.

Suddendorf has roughly 1,000 inhabitants in several settled centres and farms.

== Politics ==
=== Mayor ===
The community’s honorary mayor is Karl-Ernst Kiewit.

== Culture and sightseeing ==
=== Clubs ===
- Schützenverein Suddendorf (shooting club, founded 1886)
- Spielmannszug Suddendorf (band, founded 1950)
- SV Suddendorf-Samern (sport club, founded 1959)

=== Regular events ===
Each year in Suddendorf, a marksmanship festival, a children’s marksmanship festival, a Stoppelfest (literally “stubble festival” – a celebration of the harvest) and a Christmas market are held.
