= Bad Bentheim =

Place in Lower Saxony, Germany

- Town
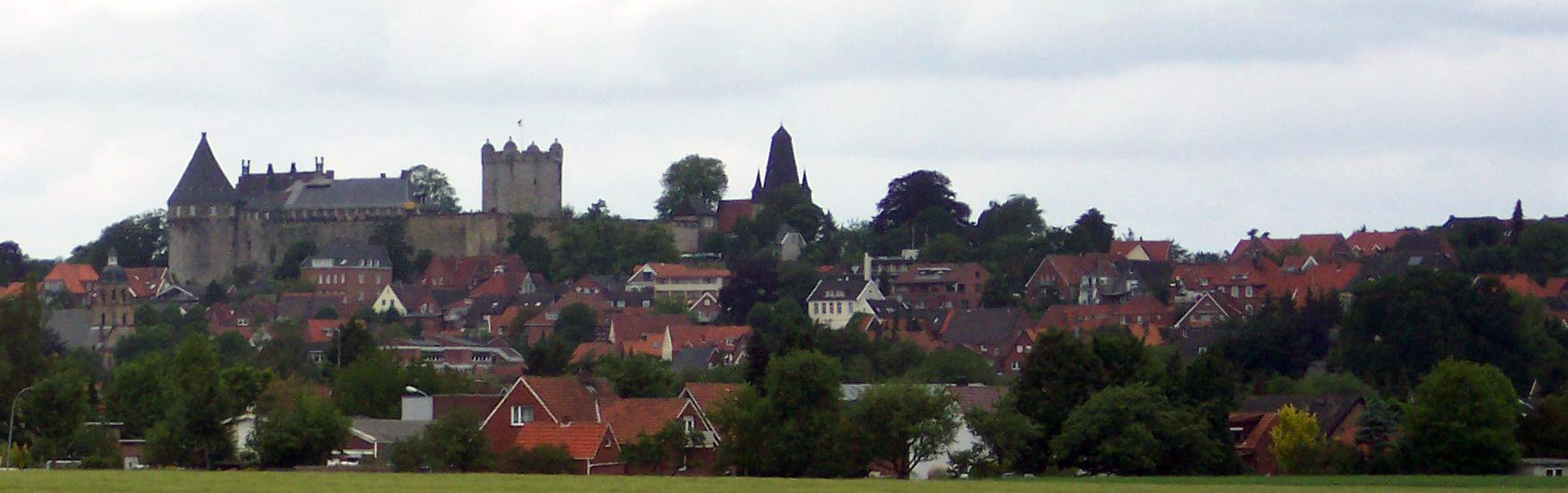
- Bad Bentheim with its castle

- Flag Coat of arms

- Location of Bad Bentheim within Grafschaft Bentheim district
- Interactive map of Bad Bentheim
- Location within Germany Location within Lower Saxony
- Coordinates: 52°18′11″N 07°09′35″E
- Country: Germany
- State: Lower Saxony
- District: Grafschaft Bentheim

Government
  - Mayor (2021–26): Volker Pannen (SPD)

Area
  - Total: 99.99 km^{2} (38.61 sq mi)
- Elevation: 49 m (161 ft)

Population (2025-12-31)
  - Total: 16,676
  - Density: 166.8/km^{2} (431.9/sq mi)
- Demonym: Bentheimer
- Time zone: UTC+01:00 (CET)
  - Summer (DST): UTC+02:00 (CEST)
- Postal codes: 48455
- Dialling codes: 05922; 05924 for Gildehaus
- Vehicle registration: NOH
- Website: http://www.stadt-badbentheim.de/index/

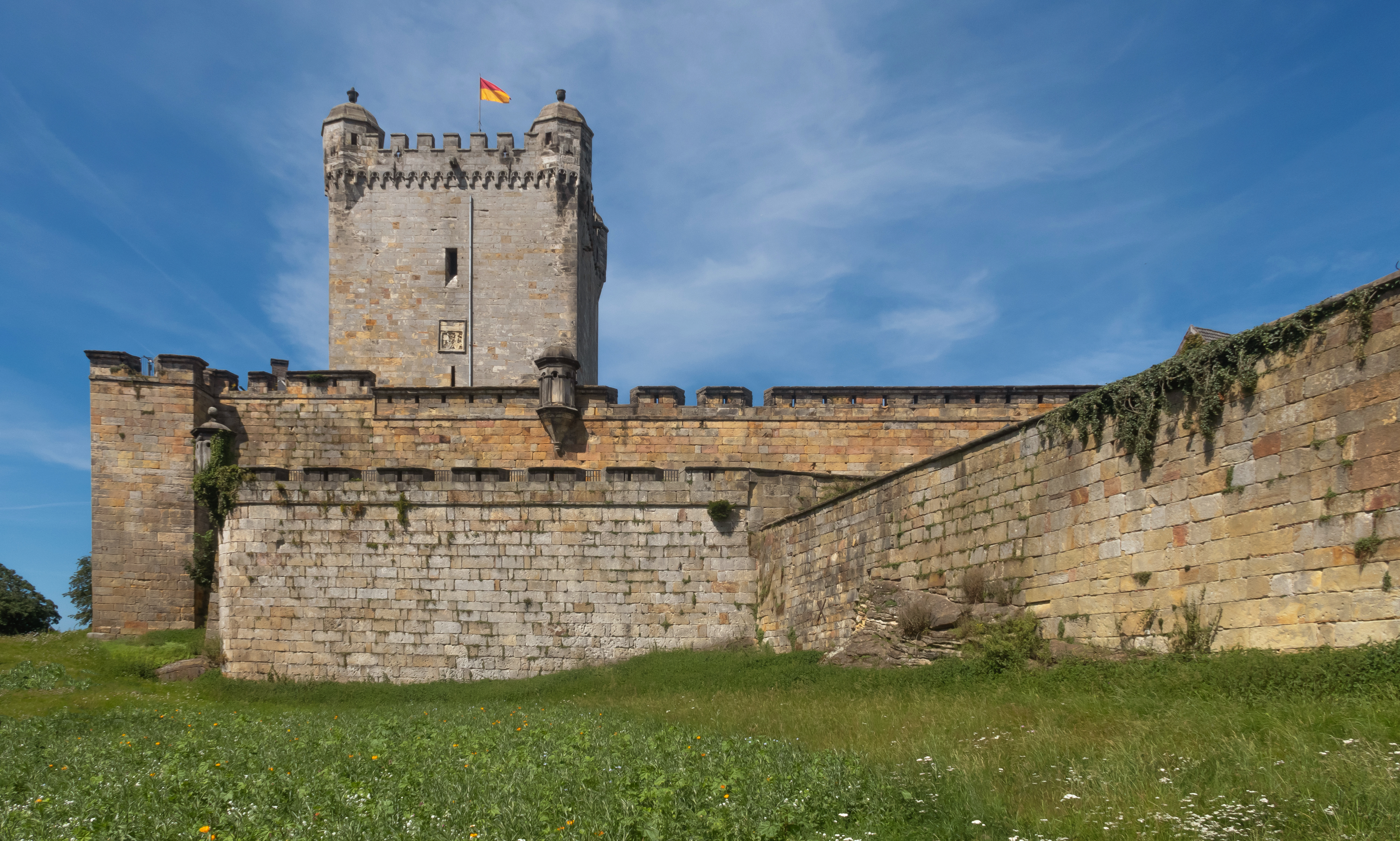
Tower (the Pulverturm) of Burg Bentheim

Bad Bentheim (German: [baːt ˈbɛnthaɪm]; Dutch Low Saxon: Beantem) is a town in the southwestern part of Lower Saxony, Germany, in the district of Grafschaft Bentheim on the borders of North Rhine-Westphalia and the Netherlands roughly 15 km south of Nordhorn and 20 km northeast of Enschede. It is a state-recognized thermal brine and sulphur spa town, hence the designation Bad (“Bath”). Also to be found in Bad Bentheim is the castle Burg Bentheim, the town's emblem.

== Geography ==
=== Extent of the municipal area ===
The town limit is 49 km, with a north–south reach of 14 km and an east–west reach of 12 km. The area under Bad Bentheim's jurisdiction, along with all its constituent communities, has a total area of 100.16 km^{2}.

=== Neighbouring communities ===
Bad Bentheim, a town shaped by the Evangelical Church, belongs to Lower Saxony's district of Bentheim. It borders on two other towns in Lower Saxony, Schüttorf and Nordhorn as well as on the more characteristically Roman Catholic towns of Gronau and Ochtrup in North Rhine-Westphalia's Steinfurt and Borken districts respectively. Bad Bentheim lies right on the Dutch border, its immediate neighbours on the other side being De Lutte and Losser, both Catholic places in the province of Overijssel (Twente region). Not far away lie the Dutch cities of Almelo, Enschede and Hengelo, and on the German side Lingen, Rheine, Münster and Osnabrück.

=== Constituent communities ===
The town comprises the centres of Achterberg, Bardel, Gildehaus, Hagelshoek, Holt und Haar, Sieringhoek, Waldseite and Westenberg.

== History ==
Bad Bentheim's first documentary mention came about 1050 under the name Binithem. There are various etymologies put forth for the town's name. It could refer to the rushes (Binsen in German) that grew on boggy land in the area in earlier times. It is also supposed by some, as with the Dutch region of Twente, that the name could go back to the Tubanti. Bad Bentheim, a former count's residence, looks back on a history rich in tradition. For centuries, this market town was the hub of the like-named county (Grafschaft) of Bentheim. In 1945, the British occupational authorities stripped “brown Bentheim” of its district seat and transferred it to the working-class town of Nordhorn, which was more centrally located.

The town's emblem is the mighty castle of the Counts of Bentheim, the Burg Bentheim, which was first mentioned in a document from 1116. About 1711, curative sulphur springs were discovered, from which grew the spa with its thermal brine and clinic.

In 1895, Queen Emma of the Netherlands and her 15-year-old daughter Wilhelmina spent several weeks at Bentheim's baths. Before this, both Otto von Bismarck and Kaiser Wilhelm I had stayed there. In Otto von Bismarck's honour, a sandstone statue in his likeness was raised on the square that also bears his name, Bismarckplatz, in Bentheim's inner town. It still stands today, right beneath the castle.

Since 1865, Bentheim has held town rights. In the course of municipal reform in Lower Saxony, the town of Bentheim, the Samtgemeinde (a municipality made up of several centres) of Gildehaus (whose member communities were Gildehaus, Achterberg, Hagelshoek, Holt und Haar, Waldseite and Westenberg) and the communities of Bardel and Sieringhoek merged on 1 March 1974 to form the unified Town of Bentheim. Since 1979, it has been called Bad Bentheim. The constituent community of Gildehaus has been a state-recognized health resort (Erholungsort) since 1982.

After the Second World War, the whole area, along with many other border areas in Germany, would have been annexed by the Netherlands under the Bakker-Schut plan in 1945, but this plan was scuttled by US objections.

Bentheim's sandstone, known as Bentheimer Gold, which is or was quarried in the main town and Gildehaus, was shipped beyond the old county's borders between the 15th and 18th centuries into the Münsterland, to East Frisia, into the Netherlands and to Belgium and Denmark. A few examples of important buildings made of this sandstone are the Royal Palace in Amsterdam, the theatre and the Church of Our Lady in Antwerp, the Catholic Church in Århus, the Martini Church's tower in Groningen (completed in 1482) and the City Hall in Münster.

Supposedly, the pedestal on which stands New York’s Statue of Liberty is even made out of Bentheim sandstone, but other German towns, among them Obernkirchen, claim that they furnished the stone for that undertaking.

=== Coat of arms ===
The town of Bad Bentheim was granted its arms in 1661 by Count Ernst Wilhelm of Bentheim and Steinfurt (1643–1693). The coat of arms shows a golden monogram consisting of the letters E and G on a red background, surrounded by nineteen likewise golden balls. The letters stand for “Ernestus Guilelmus”, the Count's name in Latin.

The golden balls stem from the district's arms, although it is unclear what they mean there. This same charge is also seen in several other coats of arms from Bentheim district, among them those borne by Nordhorn, Neuenhaus, De Wijk and Geldermalsen.

In the early 19th century, the bearing of these arms was banned. Later, in the late 19th century, the arms consisted simply of 18 golden balls on a red background, without the monogram. In 1955, the town was granted approval by the Lower Saxony ministry of the interior to bear once again the arms originally bestowed upon the town by Count Ernst Wilhelm in the 17th century.

=== Religion ===
As with the old county, the town of Bad Bentheim has mostly been shaped by Protestant belief, held by 52.6% of the townsfolk (30 June 2006), of whom 36.7% are Reformed and 15.9% Lutherans. A further 21.5% are followers of the Roman Catholic faith. The other 25.9% either hold no religious beliefs or follow other faiths.

== Culture and sightseeing ==
=== Sightseeing ===
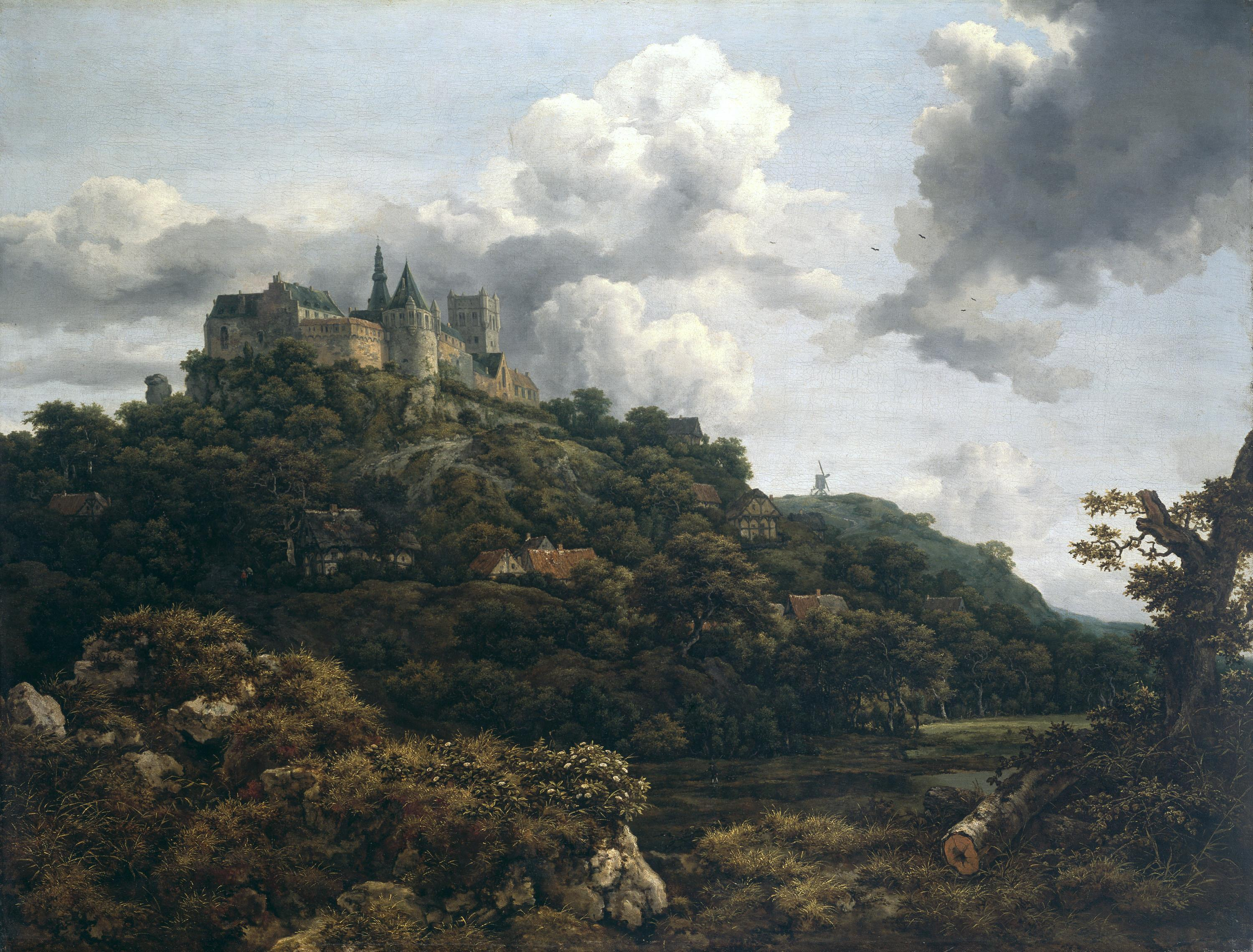
Bentheim Castle painted by Jacob van Ruisdael in 1653

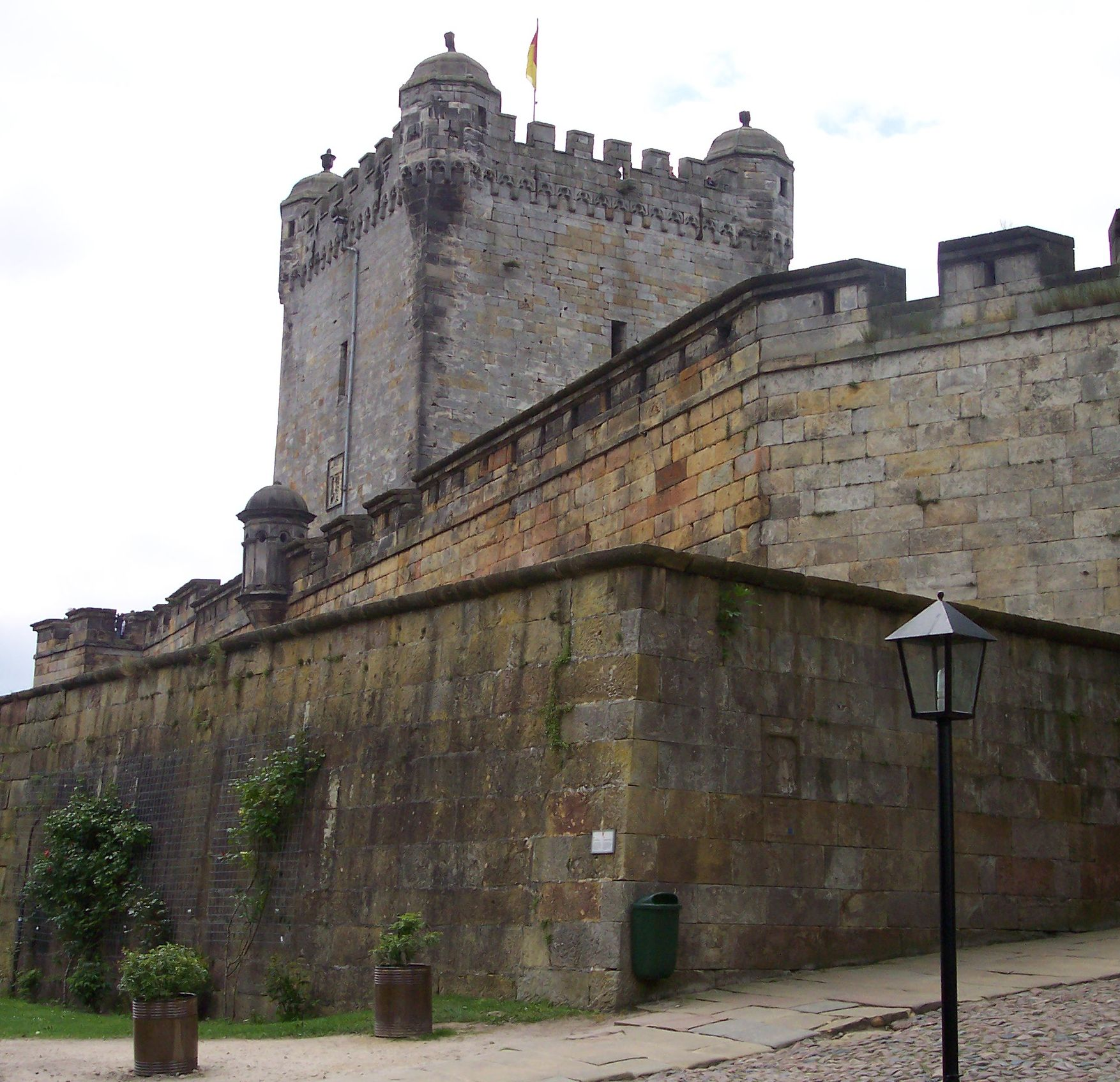
Castle walls with Pulverturm – or “Powder Tower” behind

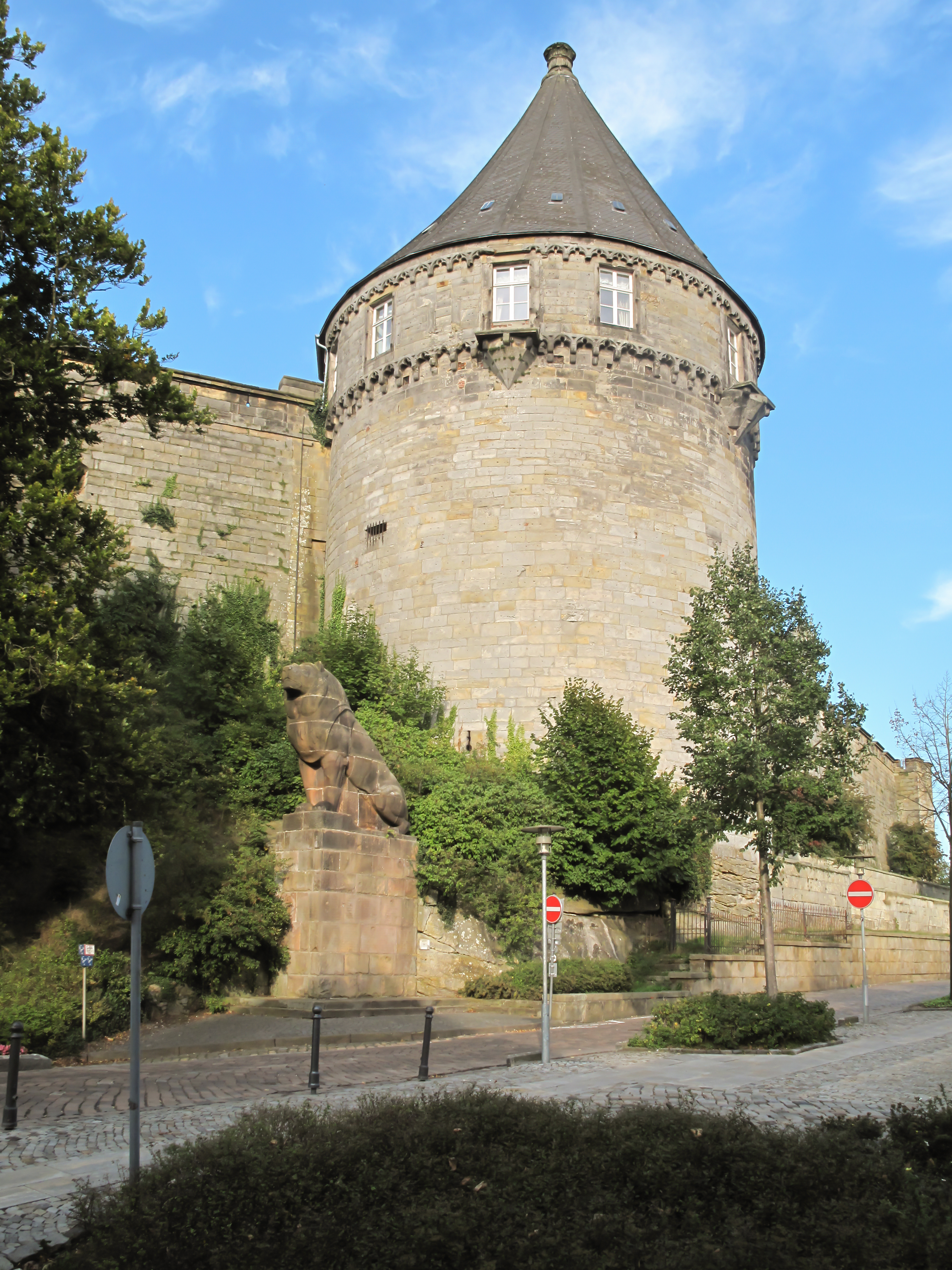
Tower: der Batterieturm

The town's most prominent emblem, the castle – Burg Bentheim – stands in the town's centre where it simply cannot be overlooked. The popular tourist site can be visited nowadays as a museum, with or without a guide. The high keep, known as the Pulverturm, or “Powder Tower”, affords visitors a good view over Bad Bentheim.

The Bad Bentheim Sandstone Museum (Bad Bentheimer Sandsteinmuseum) is a museum housed in an historic Bentheim farmer's townhouse (the farmer in this case was an Ackerbürger, who lived in town and had a townsman's rights, unlike many farmers ) with additions, which shows the history of Bentheim sandstone (quarrying and use, trade and work) and the stone's geology. Exhibits like, for instance, Romanesque baptismal fonts from the 12th and 13th centuries or fossils, to mention the two permanent exhibits, may be seen here.

The Franzosenschlucht (“Frenchman’s Gorge”) is found right next to the open-air theatre, the so-called Bentheimer Freilichtbühne (open-air stage). The Bad Bentheim open-air plays have an unusual venue set in three disused quarries, thereby offering an extraordinary natural backdrop. In summer plays are staged here. Often special events are held here such as nighttime performances.

The Haus Westerhoff is said to be one of the town's loveliest farmer's townhouses (Ackerbürgerhäuser), with its beginnings in 1656. Between 1989 and 1991, it was professionally restored. Today, artists and craftsmen display their works there.

Also worth seeing is the Reformed Protestant church with its Calvinistic interior décor, within which, among others, Count Arnold II zu Bentheim-Tecklenburg lies buried. It was built in 1696 on the site of the former early Gothic church from 1321, of which only bits are now maintained, such as a Gothic room and the Count's crypt that lies thereunder. Today it is a plain Baroque church in the middle of which stands an old stone pulpit. In the graveyard around the church are found impressive, centuries-old gravestones of importance to art history.

The Roman Catholic Church of St. John the Baptist (Kirche St. Johannes Baptist) with its Baroque interior lies west of the Schlosspark and comes from the time of the Counterreformation. At Count Ernst Wilhelm's behest, it was built in 1670 from Bentheim sandstone.

Outside, the building is rather plain, but inside there are stately, early Baroque altars and remains of the original glazing in the windows in the north wall.

Other sightseeing highlights include:

- evangelisch-altreformierte Kirche (church, 1896)
- Martin-Luther-Kirche (1912)
- Bardel Franciscan Monastery
- Naturökologisch - Niederländisches Ferienreservat Gut Langen (holiday reserve)
- Bentheimer Wald (forest)
- Bentheimer Berge (mountains)

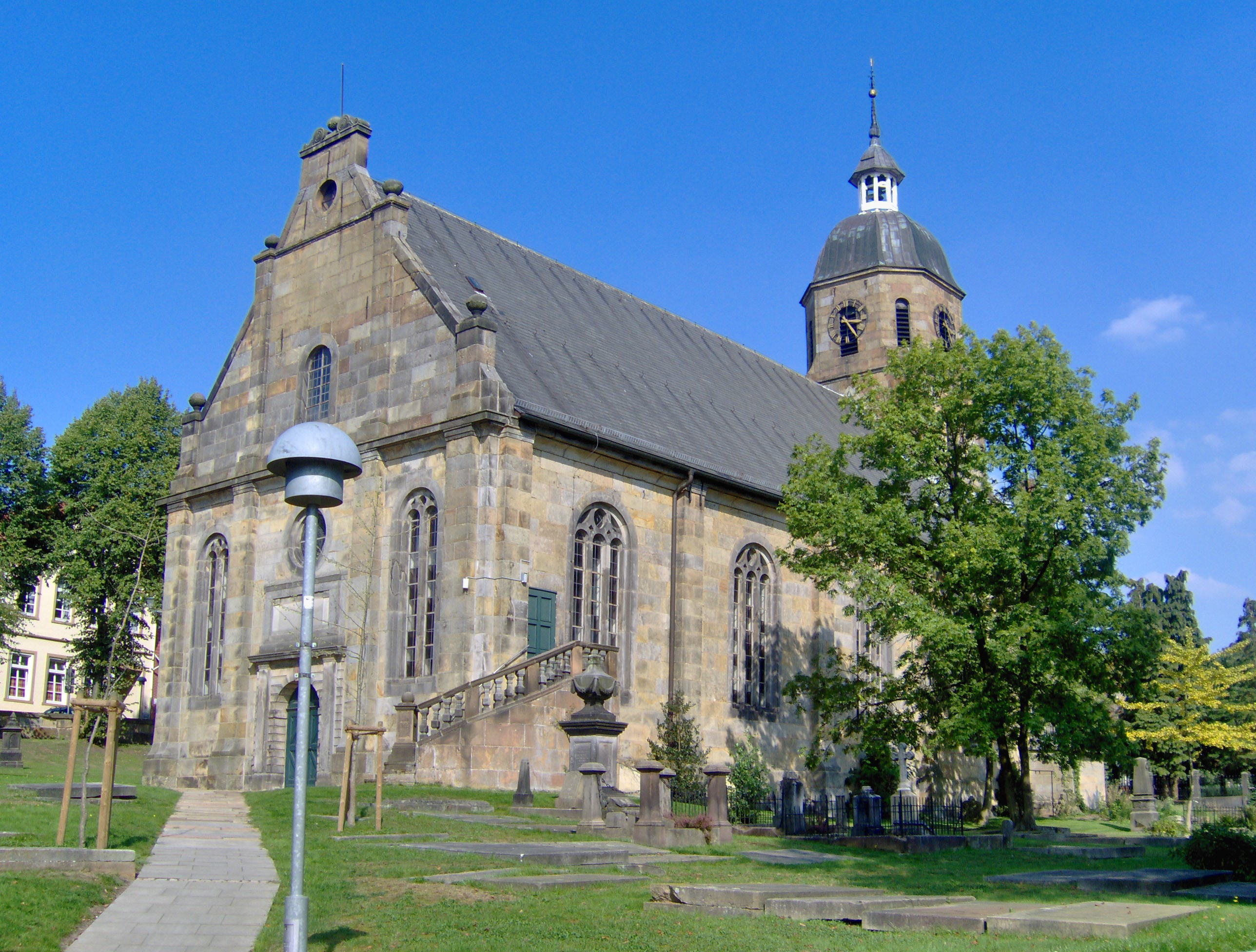
Reformed Protestant church from 1696

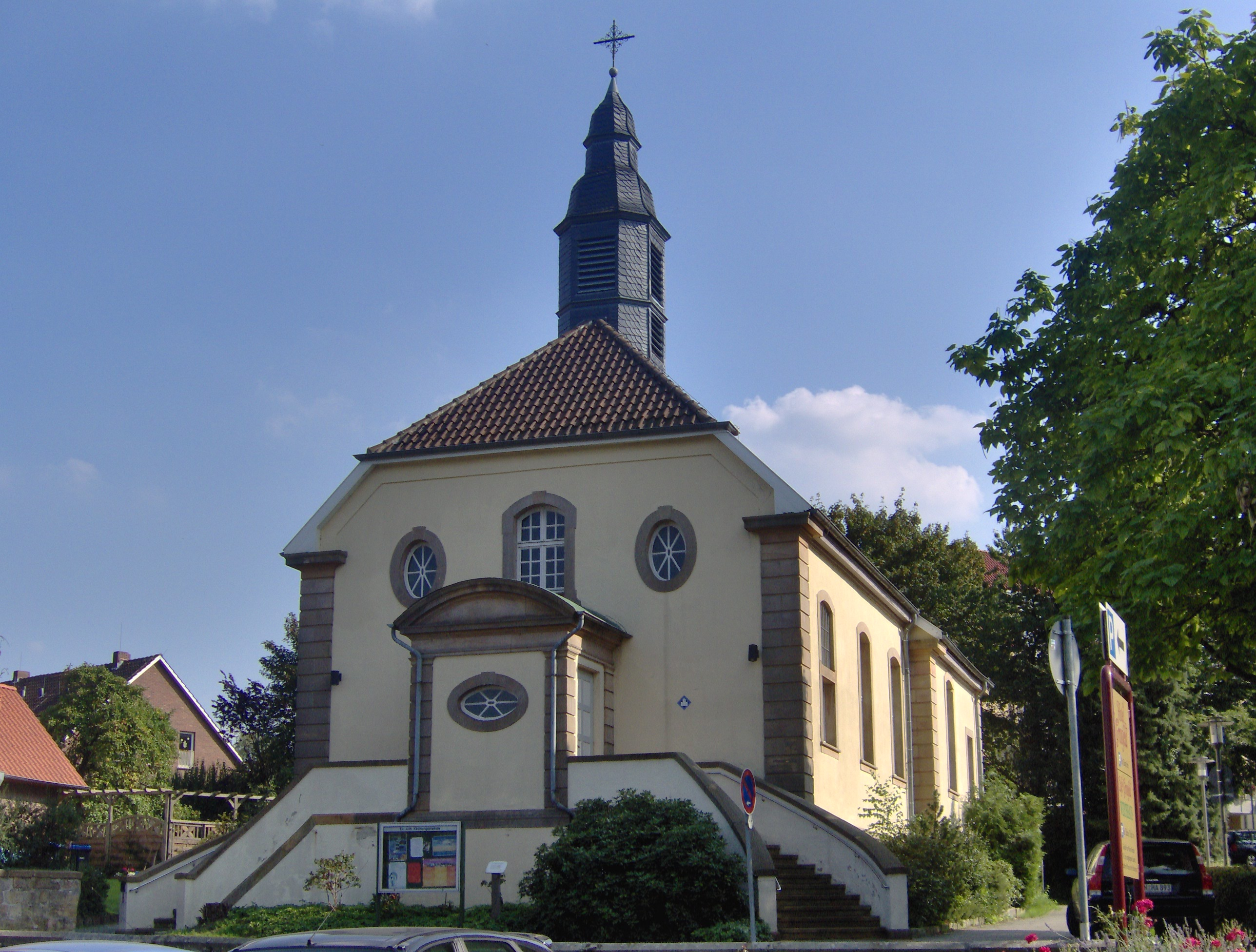
Martin-Luther-Kirche from 1912

=== Culture ===
A popular activity in the town is the Nachtwächterrundgänge, or Night Watchman's Walks. These take place Monday, Friday and Saturday evenings beginning at 9 o’clock. The meeting point is the lower castle gate at the Burg Bentheim. These walking tours are staged by the town travel office and are free. On these nighttime tours through Bad Bentheim visitors are treated to stories and legends about the town and the castle as well as historical data and facts, making for an interesting insight into the town's history.

The so-called Weggen wegbringen is an old tradition still practised in Bad Bentheim and the old county. The Weggen is a metre-long loaf of raisin bread brought by friends and neighbours after a child's birth to the family to celebrate the newborn's future. The Weggen is borne for this endeavour on a ladder.

Another cultural “hallmark”, in this case culinary, is the Bentheimer Moppen. These are rather hard, long-keeping biscuits baked with a great deal of caraway, and are eaten in Bad Bentheim and Schüttorf, as well as the neighbouring areas, mainly around Christmastime. They are supposed to be a special treat if dipped beforehand in coffee. The caraway gives them a flavour that sets them very much apart from the usual Christmastime treats.

- Recipe:Bentheimer Moppen

The town is also known for the Ritterfestspiele Bad Bentheim, an annual historical festival held in the castle park.

== Mayors ==
List of mayors of Bad Bentheim
Mayor	Term of office
Johann Krabbe	1899–1930
Christian Mikkelsen	1930–1937
Karl Raapitz, (NSDAP; introduced by the Kreisleiter)	1938–1944
Karl Brose (NSDAP; introduced by the Kreisleiter)	1944–1945 (9 months)
Hermann Lammers, (introduced by the British military government)	1945
Johann Schütte, farmer (CDU)	1946–1949
August Lippold (CDU)	1949–1956
Gerhard Krabbe (CDU)	1956–1964
Dietrich Somberg, tax official (CDU)	1964–1991
Horst Winkler (SPD)	1991–1996
Günter Alsmeier, tax official (CDU)	1996–2006
Volker Pannen, tax official (SPD)	since 2006

== Infrastructure and economy ==
=== Transport ===
==== Air transport ====
Bad Bentheim is roughly one hour's drive from Münster/Osnabrück International Airport (FMO) in Greven. A regional airport is found in Klausheide near Nordhorn, about 30 minutes’ drive away.

==== Rail transport ====
Bad Bentheim station lies on the Wiehengebirgs-Bahn, which begins in Bad Bentheim, although connecting tracks continue west into the Netherlands. The local train on this line is the RB 61 (Bad Bentheim–Rheine–Osnabrück–Herford–Bielefeld).

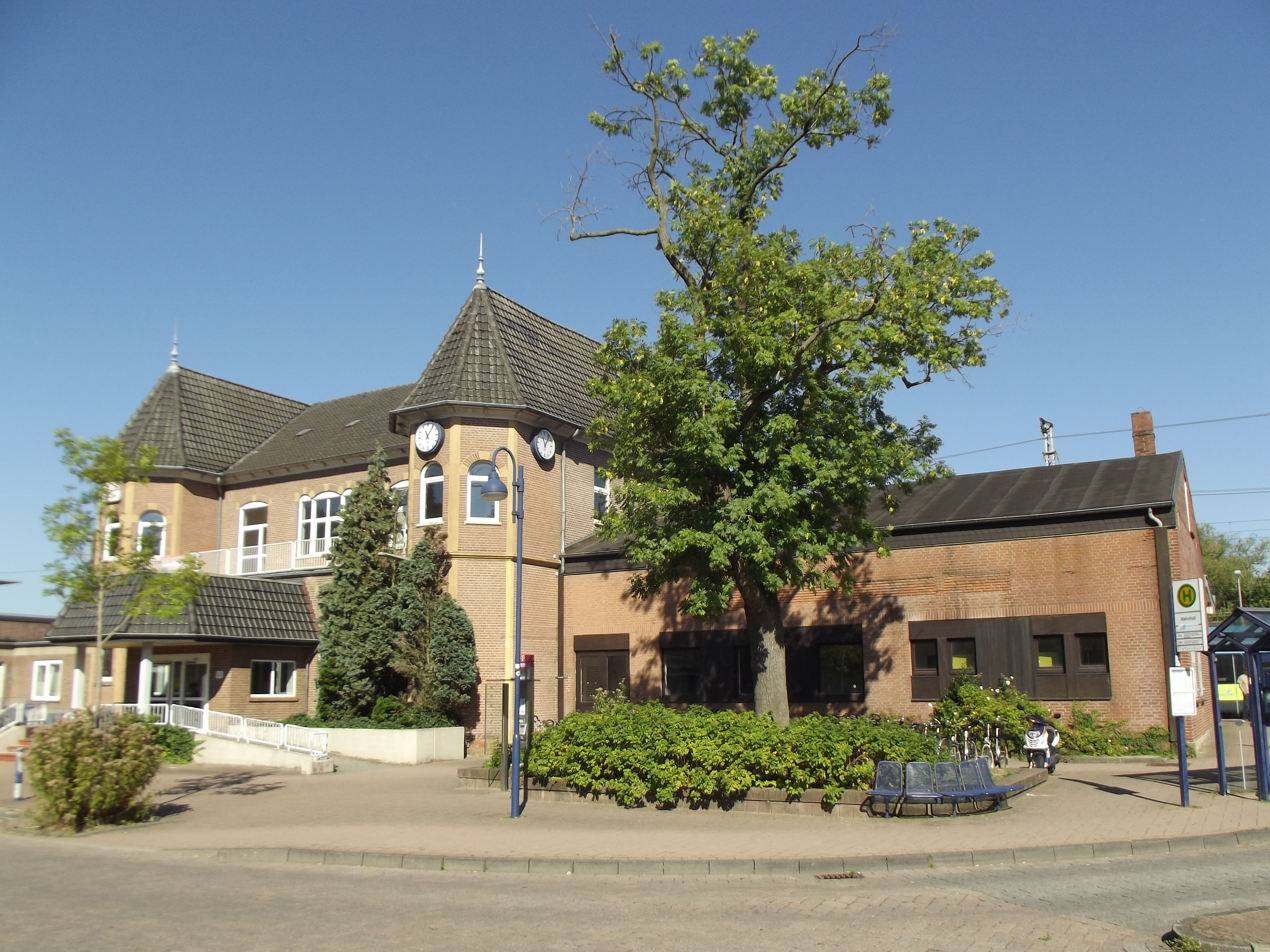
Railway Station Bad Bentheim

As for long-distance rail travel, Bad Bentheim is served by the IC-77 (Amsterdam–Osnabrück–Hanover–Berlin). All the international trains have a standstill at the station of Bad Bentheim because the locomotive of the trains has to be changed as Germany and The Netherlands have different electric systems for their trains. These systems are not compatible.

==== Bus services ====
There are bus services to Gronau (Westfalen) and Nordhorn.

==== Roads ====
The town lies on Bundesstraße 403 and is furthermore connected to the long-distance road network through the Autobahnen A 30 (Bad Oeynhausen – Osnabrück – Hengelo) and A 31 (Emden – Oberhausen).

=== Economy ===
Bad Bentheim has small and medium-sized businesses for tourism typical of smaller spa towns: cafés, hotels and guesthouses. The constituent community of Gildehaus has developed itself into a centre for the German-Dutch ambulance trade.

The town's biggest employers are:

- The Eylarduswerk in Gildehaus; an Evangelical Deaconry institution for helping youth; roughly 210 employees
- Fachklinik Bad Bentheim (dermatology, psoriasis, rheumatology, orthopaedics); roughly 270 employees
- Site and offices of the oil and gas companies Deilmann, KCA Deutag, Interfels; worldwide roughly 9.500 employees

==== Agriculture ====
Bad Bentheim or the surrounding “county” is known for two breeds of domestic livestock, namely the Bentheim sheep and the Bentheim Black Pied pig.

== Leisure ==
=== Schloßpark ===
A popular meeting and walking place in town is the Schloßpark beneath the castle. This is a geometrical 12-ha parkland laid out going by old records in the style of the princely gardens of the 18th century. In a large lake at the park's north end are found ducks that are often fed by visitors. Other animals, such as wild rabbits, may be spotted from time to time in the park's bushes.

In summer there is a fountain in the Schloßpark, which, shoots up into the air from a flat, sandstone basin. In winter, the water is pumped out and the fountain does not run. This fountain is surrounded by symmetrically laid-out rose beds, themselves enclosed by hedges. In winter, the townsfolk, especially the younger ones, come to the park to run their sleds down the steep slopes in the south part of the park, right beneath the castle. In late summer (on the last Saturday in August), the Bad Bentheim flea market is held here.

In the large car park in the western part of the park, the summer and autumn fairs, and the town's shooting festival, are held annually.

Near to this car park is the Bad Bentheim Sandstone Museum.

== Famous people ==
=== Honorary citizens ===
After the Second World War, the town of Bad Bentheim sought to improve once again the noticeably cooler relations with its neighbours to the west, that is to say, the Dutch. Prof. Dr. Hendricus Prakke, since 1966 an honorary citizen of Bentheim, strongly supported this quest. Prakke, who died in 1992, was a citizen of the Dutch town of Assen, with which Bad Bentheim has been intensively cultivating a partnership since 1959.

Also Herr Dr. h. c. Hans-Carl Deilmann was awarded the town's honours when his business, Deilmann AG (now KCA Deutag), employing more than 8,000 in the 1970s, took a leading part in the economic upswing in Bentheim and the old county. To honour Deilmann, Deilmannstraße in Bad Bentheim was named after him.

=== Celebrities ===
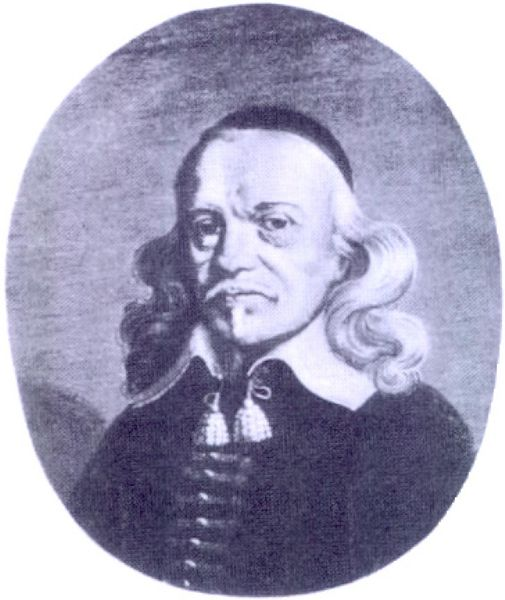
Johan Picardt

- Johan Picardt, (1600–1670), German-Dutch, moor colonizer, Reformed Protestant pastor, doctor and writer
- Wilhelm Heinrich von Bentheim-Steinfurt, (1584–1632), member of the Fruitbearing Society, count, Capitular of Strasbourg
- Hanna Krabbe, (born 1945), was born and grew up in Bad Bentheim, Red Army Faction member, released from prison in 1996
- Friederike Krabbe, (born 1950), was born and grew up in Bad Bentheim, Red Army Faction member, international warrant issued for her arrest
- Gaby Baginsky, (born 1954), hit singer with about 20 albums released, resident in Bad Bentheim
- Franz Wittenbrink, (born 1948), arranger, composer, conductor, director and pianist born in Bad Bentheim
- Hermann Schulze-Berndt, religious educator and author
- Margitta Gummel, (born 1941), athlete and Olympic medallist; settled in Bad Bentheim
- Rene Lange, (born 1988), footballer
- Hayo Vierck (1939–1989), archaeologist
- Nils Röseler (born 1992), footballer
