= List of municipal flags of Northern Germany =

This page lists the municipal flags of Northern Germany. It is a part of the Lists of German municipal flags, which is split into regions. In turn, it is also split into states due to its size.

== Index by state ==
Click the states to browse the municipal flags

== Bremen ==
=== Cities ===
| Municipality | Flag | Coat of arms | Enactment Date Abolition Date | Description |
|---|---|---|---|---|
| Bremen | | | 1952 | Main articles: Flag of Bremen and Coat of arms of Bremen The flag features eight equal horizontal stripes of red alternating with white and checked at the hoist. |
| Bremen | | | 1952 | Variant with the coat of arms. |
| Bremen | | | 1952 | Variant with the greater coat of arms. |
| Bremerhaven | | | 28 May 1947 | The red-white-red flag with the coat of arms. The ship represents the Hanseatic League while its sails represents the Hanseatic cities (the red-white horizontal sail with the red cross and the key represents Bremerhaven, the blue sail with a gold anchor represents Geestemünde and the red sail with two scythe blades represents Lehe). Both the ship and fish represents the municipality as a port city. Designed by Waldemar Mallek. |

=== Historical ===
| Municipality | Flag | Coat of arms | Enactment Date Abolition Date | Description |
|---|---|---|---|---|
| Bremen | | | 14th century 1811 | Hanseatic flag |
| Bremen | | | 1871 1918 | The flag features eight equal horizontal stripes of red alternating with the coat of arms. |
| Bremen | | | 1935 1945 | Variant without the coat of arms. |
| Bremen | | | 1891 1892 | Sea flag. |
| Bremen | | | 1893 1921 | Sea flag. |
| Bremen | | | 1893 1921 | Sea flag. |
| Bremen | | | 1921 1933 | Sea flag. |
| Bremen | | | 1933 1935 | Sea flag. |
| Bremen | | | 1952 | Service flag. |
| Bremen | | | 1895 1918 | Navy pilot flag. |
| Bremen | | | 1895 1918 | Navy customs flag. |
| Bremen | | | 1921 1933 | Navy customs flag. |

== Hamburg ==
=== Cities ===
| Municipality | Flag | Coat of arms | Enactment Date | Description |
|---|---|---|---|---|
| Hamburg | | | Coat of arms: 16th century Flag: 1834 | Main articles: Flag of Hamburg and Coat of arms of Hamburg A red flag with a white castle. |
| Hamburg | | | Coat of arms: 16th century Flag: 1834 | Middle coat of arms. |
| Hamburg | | | Coat of arms: 16th century Flag: 1897 | Variant with the greater coat of arms. |
| Hamburg | | | 1642 | Naval flag |

=== Boroughs ===
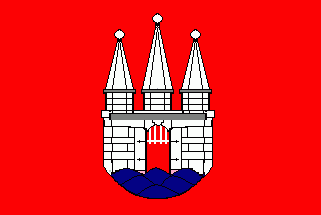
Altona

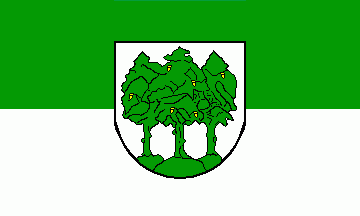
Bergedorf

Eimsbüttel

Hamburg-Mitte

Hamburg-Nord

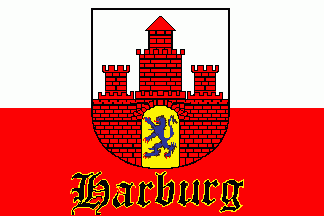
Harburg

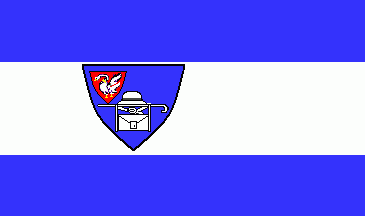
Wandsbek

=== Historical ===
| Municipality | Flag | Coat of arms | Enactment Date Abolition Date | Description |
|---|---|---|---|---|
| Hamburg | | | 13th century 1685 | Hanseatic flag. A red flag. |
| Hamburg | | | 1685 14 May 1752 | A red flag with a white castle. |

== Lower Saxony ==
=== Cities ===
| Municipality | Flag | Coat of arms | Enactment Date Abolition Date | Description | References |
|---|---|---|---|---|---|
| Braunschweig | | | First adopted: 1231; Current form: 1954 | A horizontal red and white flag with the coat of arms. The seal features a red Brunswick Lion as a symbolism of royal dignity and courage and it is used by many monarchies. It is used by Henry the Lion (one of the famous individuals of the House of Welf) during his lifetime. Its modern form is designed in 1954 by Hermann Eidenbenz. | |

Emden

Göttingen

Göttingen (variant)

Hanover

Hildesheim

Oldenburg

Osnabrück

Osnabrück (variant)

Salzgitter

Schneverdingen

Wolfsburg

Wolfsburg (variant 1)

Wolfsburg (variant 2)

=== Samtgemeinde ===
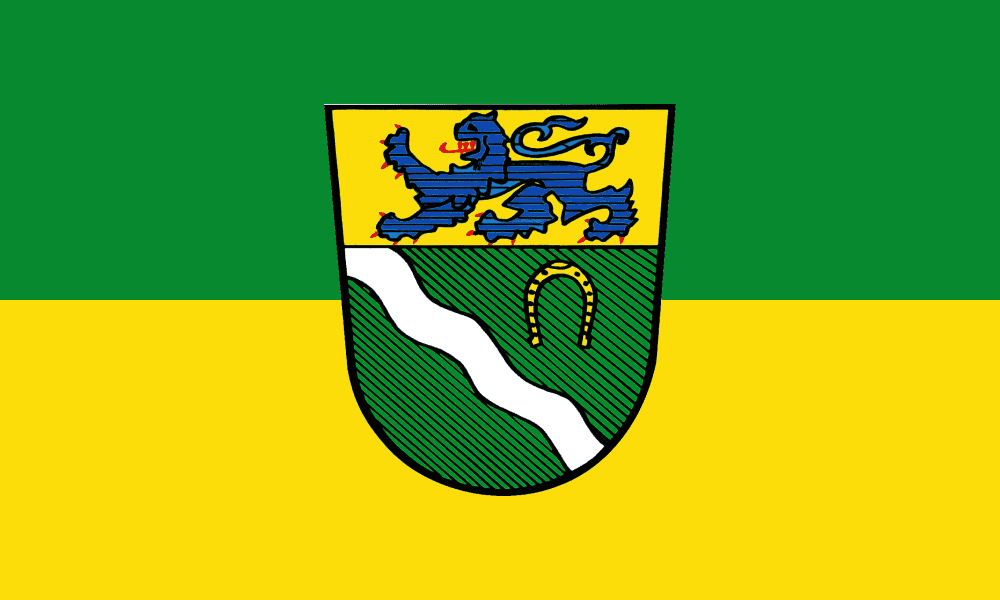
Elbmarsch

Esens

Hattorf am Harz

Hattorf am Harz (variant)

Hollenstedt

Holtriem

Jümme

Land Hadeln

Radolfshausen

Selsingen

Spelle

=== Towns and villages ===
Achim

Adelebsen

Andervenne

Andervenne (variant)

Apen

Appel

Aurich

Bad Bentheim

Bad Fallingbostel

Bad Fallingbostel (variant)

Bad Grund

Bad Lauterberg

Bad Lauterberg (variant)

Bad Münder

Bad Münder (variant)

Bad Zwischenahn

Baltrum

Barßel

Basdahl

Bassum

Beesten

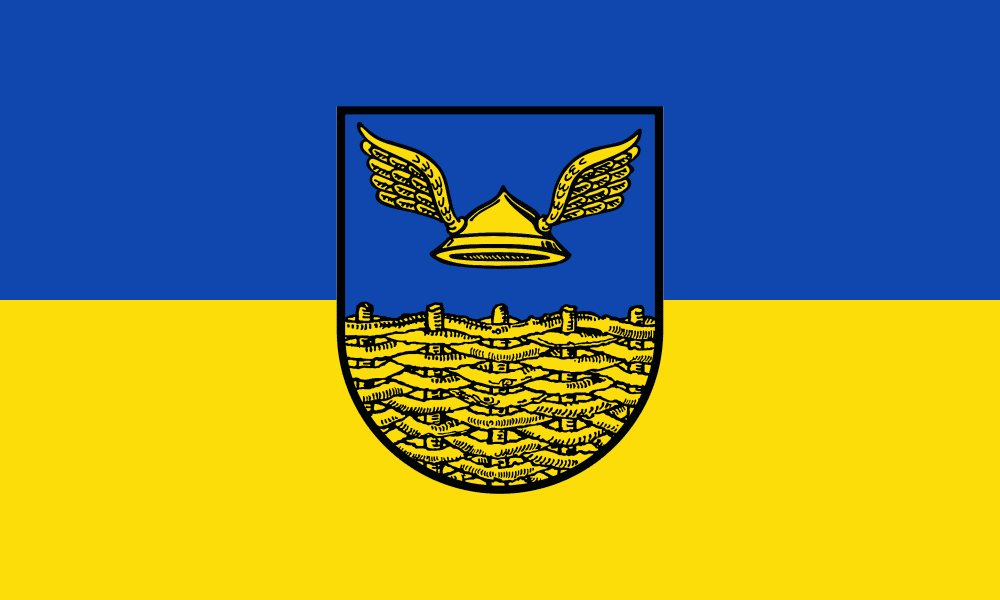
Belum

Berumbur

Beverstedt

Bilshausen

Bockhorn

Bodensee

Boffzen

Boffzen (variant)

Börger

Borkum

Bösel

Bovenden

Brake

Brinkum

Buchholz in der Nordheide

Buchholz in der Nordheide (variant)

Bückeburg

Bülstedt

Burgdorf

Burgdorf (variant)

Celle

Cloppenburg

Damme (Dümmer)

Damme (Dümmer) (variant)

Dassel

Delmenhorst

Deinstedt

Derental

Dersum

Dornum

Dörpen

Drestedt

Drestedt

Drochtersen

Edewecht

Elbingerode

Elbingerode (variant)

Emlichheim

Emsbueren

Emstek

Emtinghausen

Esche

Esens

Essen

Esterwegen

Estorf

Freren

Friedeburg

Friesoythe

Fürstenberg

Garrel

Geeste

Geeste (variant)

Geestland

Georgsdorf

Georgsmarienhütte

Georgsmarienhütte (variant)

Getelo

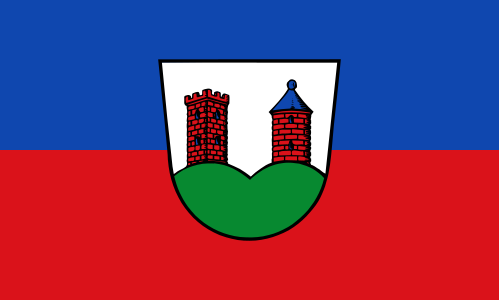
Gleichen

Goslar

Goslar (variant)

Gölenkamp

Gnarrenburg

Großefehn

Großheide

Guderhandviertel

Hage

Hagen im Bremischen

Hagermarsch

Halbemond

Halle

Haren

Haselünne

Hattorf am Harz

Hattorf am Harz (variant)

Hechthausen

Heinbockel

Herzberg am Harz

Herzberg am Harz (variant)

Himmelpforten

Hinte

Hoerden am Harz

Hoerden am Harz (variant)

Holzminden

Holzminden (variant)

Hoogstede

Ihlienworth

Ihlow

Isterberg

Itterbeck

Jemgum

Jever

Jever (variant)

Jühnde

Jühnde (variant)

Juist

Kettenkamp

Kranenburg

Krebeck

Krummhörn

Laar

Lage

Langeoog

Lauenförde

Lingen

Lingen (variant)

Lastrup

Leer

Leezdorf

Lindern

Lohne

Löningen

Lüneburg

Lünne

Lünne (variant)

Lütetsburg

Marienhafe

Melle

Melle (variant)

Meppen

Meppen (variant)

Messingen

Mittelnkirchen

Molbergen

Munster

Munster (variant)

Neuenhaus

Neuenkirchen im Alten Land

Neuhaus

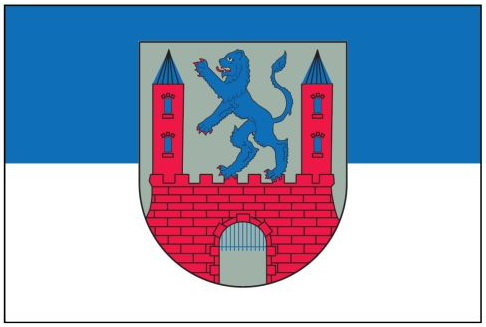
Neustadt am Rübenberge

Neu Wulmstorf

Niemetal

Norden

Norderney

Norderney (variant)

Nordhorn

Nordleda

Northeim

Northeim (variant 1)

Northeim (variant 2)

Oberndorf

Ohne

Osteel

Osten

Osterholz-Scharmbeck

Osterholz-Scharmbeck (variant 1)

Osterholz-Scharmbeck (variant 2)

Osterwald

Ostrhauderfehn

Papenburg

Quendorf

Rastede

Rechtsupweg

Regesbostel

Rhauderfehn

Rhede

Rhede (variant)

Ringe

Rosengarten

Rosdorf

Rüdershausen

Salzbergen

Salzbergen (variant)

Samern

Sande

Saterland

Schapen

Schapen (variant)

Scheden

Schöppenstedt

Schöppenstedt (variant)

Schortens

Schwerinsdorf

Schüttorf

Seeburg

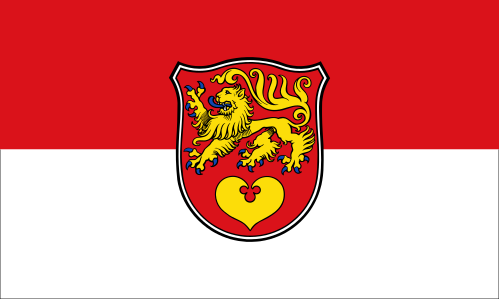
Seesen

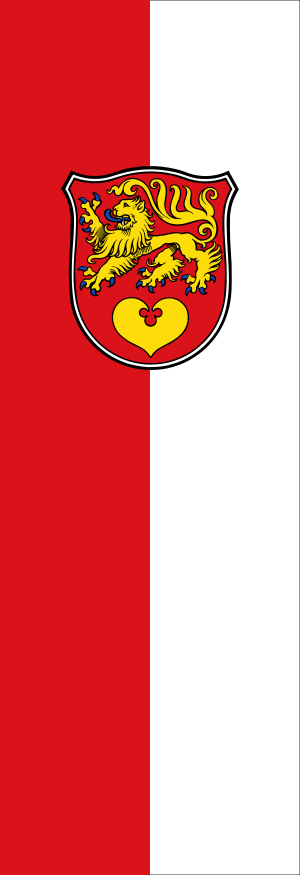
Seesen (variant 1)

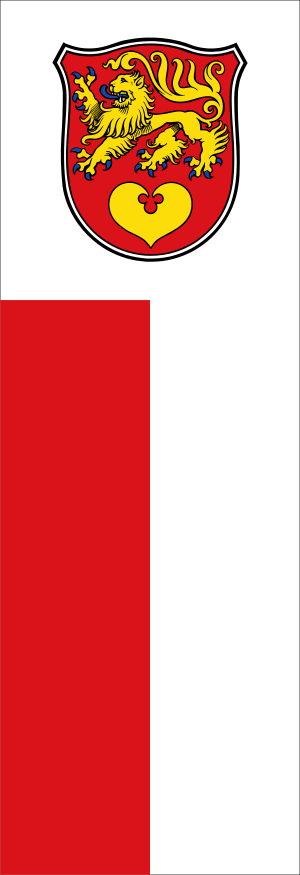
Seesen (variant 2)

Seevetal

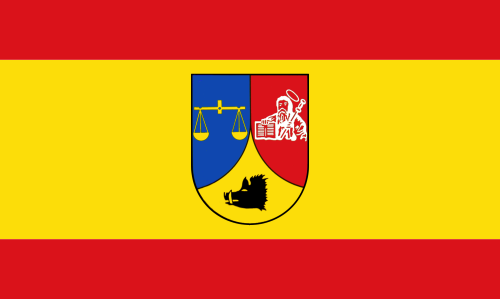
Soegel

Soltau

Soltendieck

Spelle

Spiekeroog

Spiekeroog ("S" variant)

Südbrookmerland

Tespe

Thuine

Thuine (variant)

Uelsen

Upgant-Schott

Uplengen

Varel

Vechta

Vechta (variant)

Verden an der Aller

Visselhövede

Visselhövede (variant)

Waake

Walsrode

Walsrode (variant)

Wangerland

Wangerland (variant)

Wangerooge

Wanna

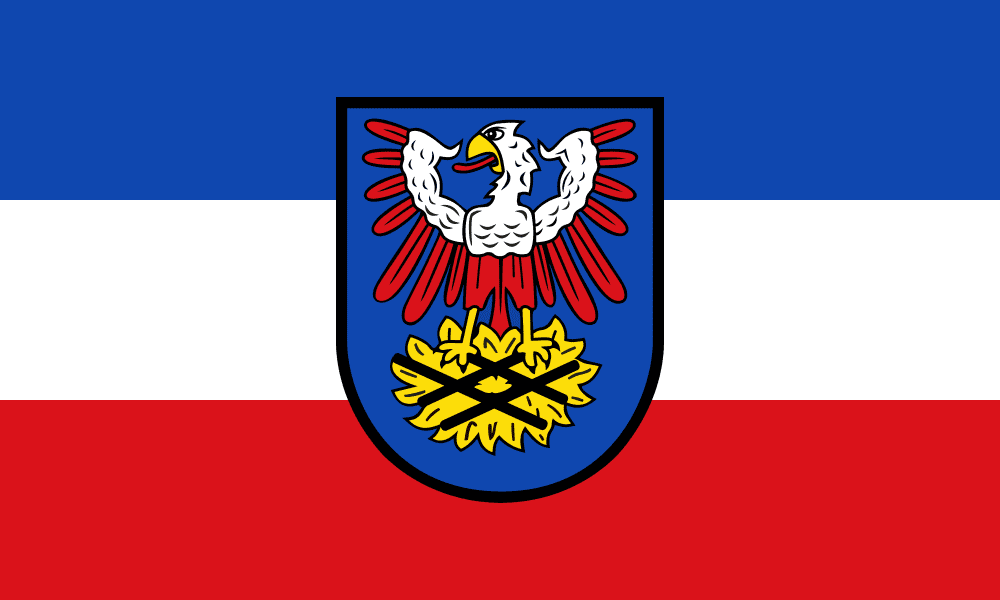
Weener

Wenzendorf

Westerstede

Westoverledingen

Wiefelstede

Wielen

Wiesmoor

Wietmarschen

Wietzendorf

Wilhelmshaven

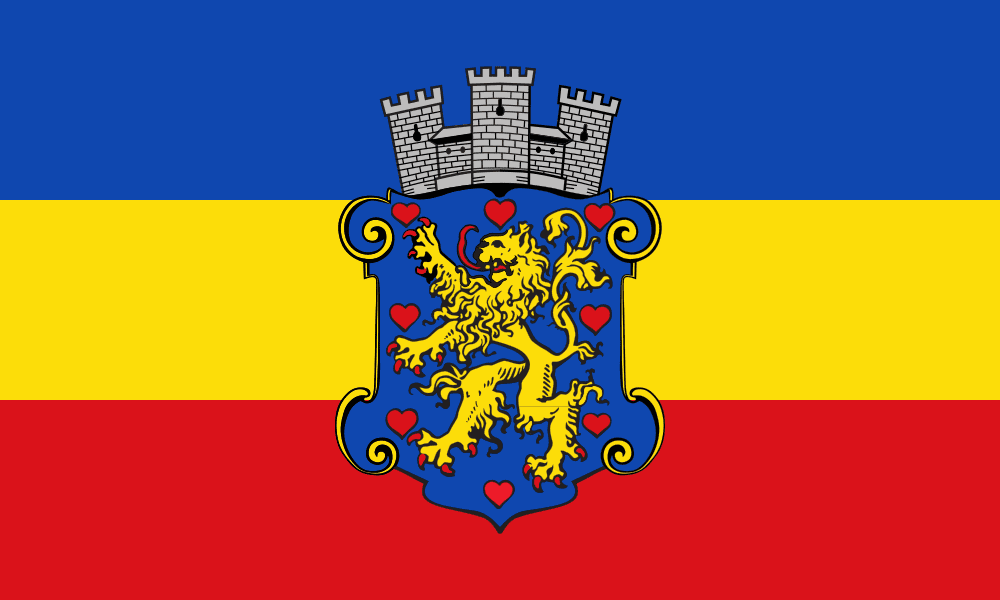
Winsen (Luhe)

Wirdum

Wittmund

Wittmund (variant)

Wolfenbüttel

Wolfenbüttel (variant)

Wollbrandshausen

Wollershausen

Wrestedt

Wulften am Harz

Wulften am Harz (variant)

Zetel

Zeven

=== Historical ===
Badenhausen (1961–2013)

Badenhausen (1961–2013; variant)

Bingum (1950–1973)

Cadenberge (1939–2016)

Eisdorf (1951–2013)

Eisdorf (1951–2013; variant)

Gittelde (1953–2013)

Gittelde (1953–2013; variant)

Hooksiel (1949–1972)

Langen (1981–2015)

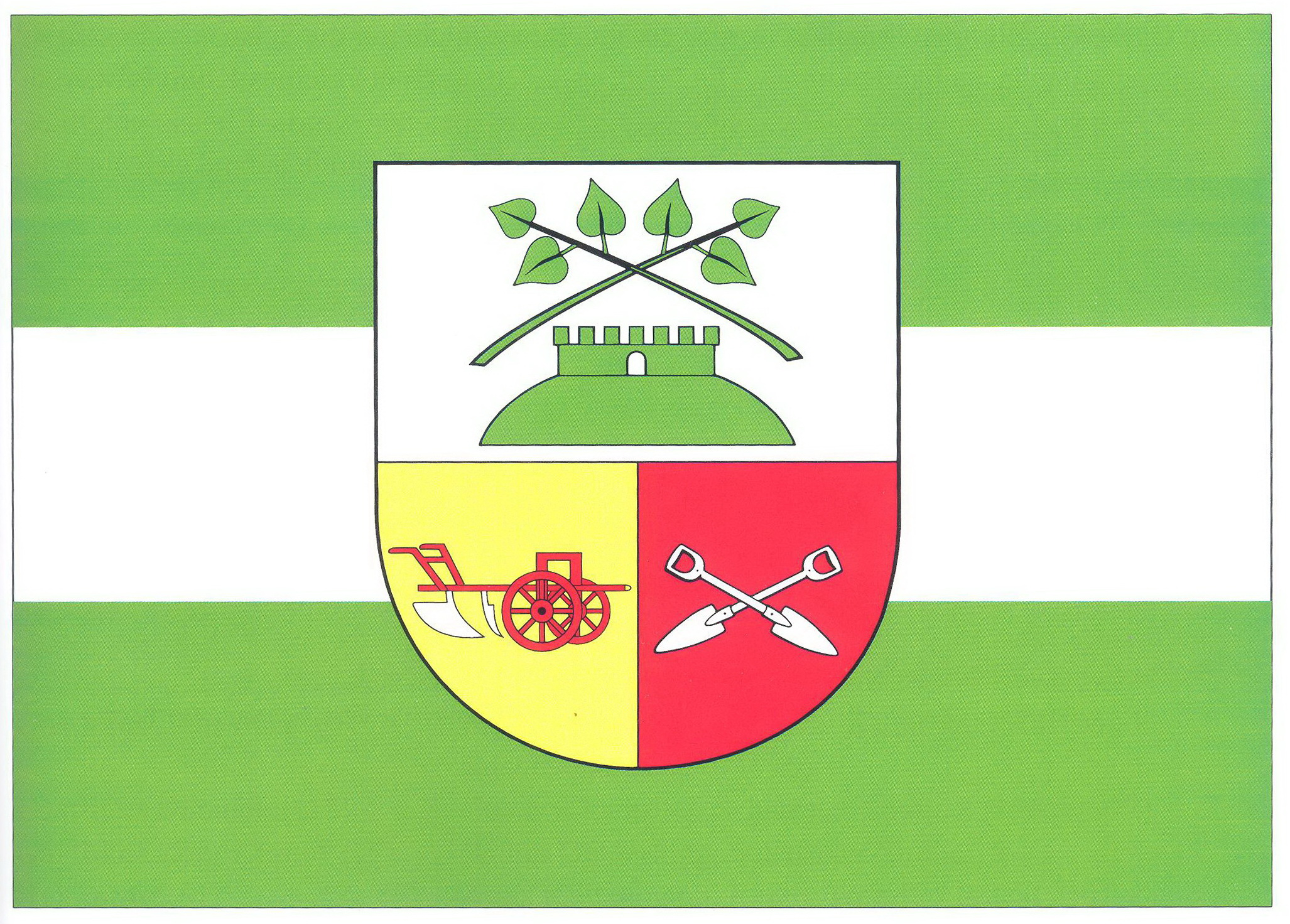
Scharrel (Neustadt am Rübenberge) (1900–1974)

Windhausen (1973–2013)

Windhausen (1973–2013; variant)

== Mecklenburg-Vorpommern ==
=== Cities ===
Neubrandenburg

Rostock

Rostock (sea flag)

Schwerin

Stralsund

Wismar

=== Communities ===
Rüterberg

=== Towns and villages ===
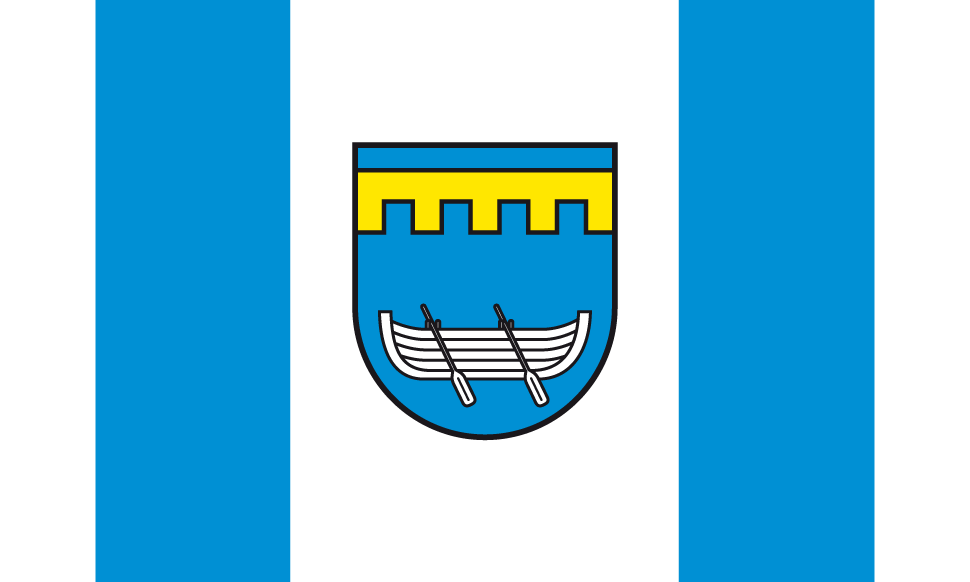
Altefähr

Bad Doberan

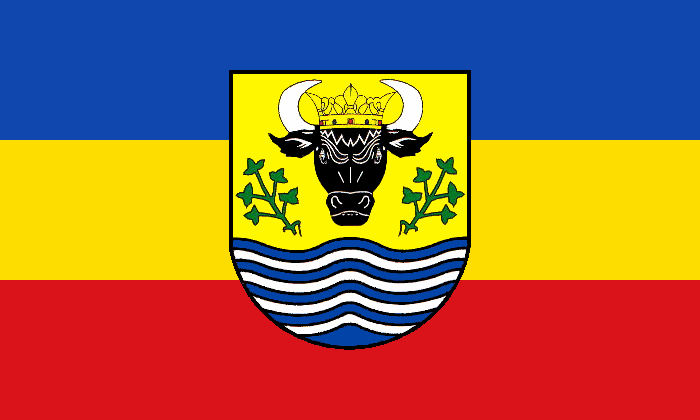
Bad Sülze

Boizenburg

Bresegard bei Picher

Brüel

Burg Stargard

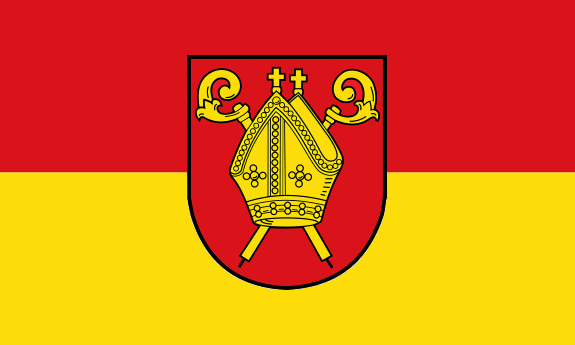
Bützow

Cölpin

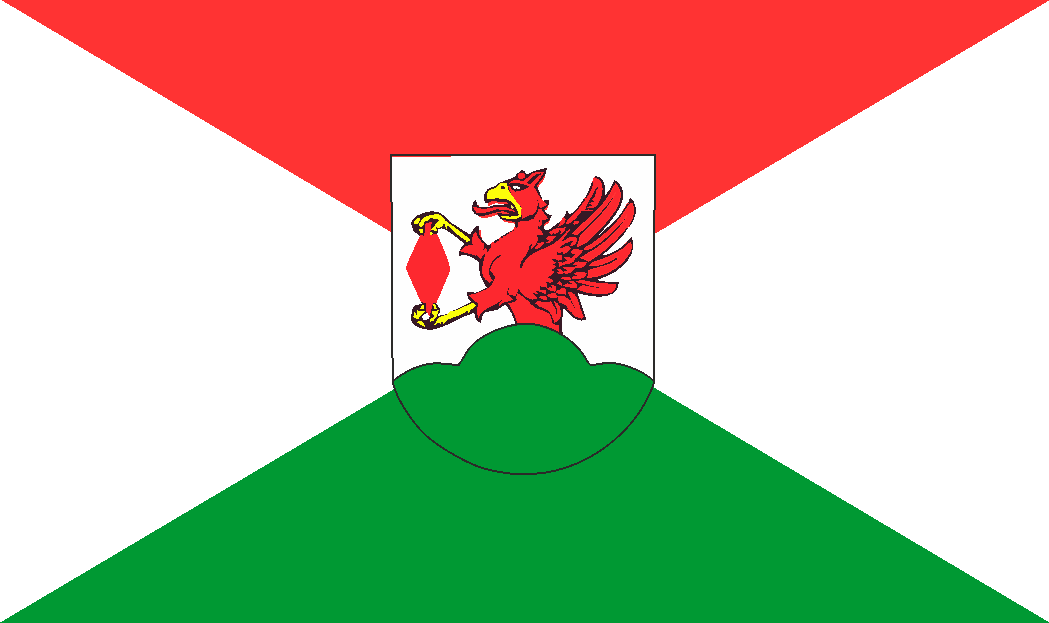
Ducherow

Ducherow (variant)

Eggesin

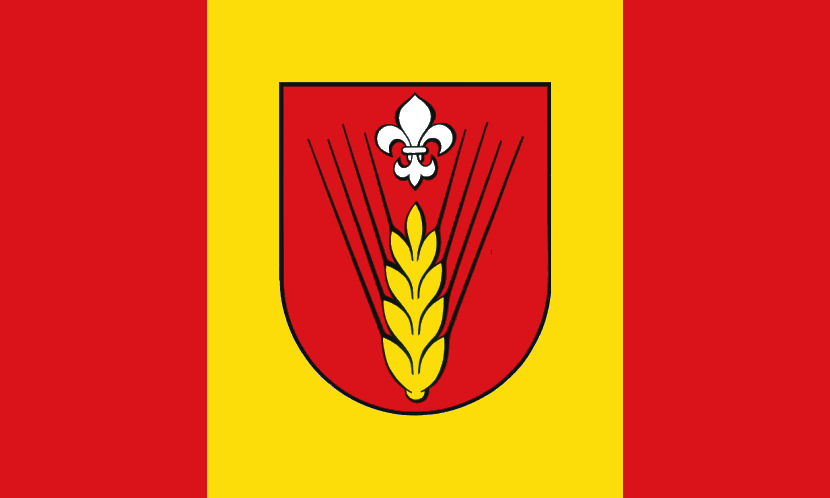
Glasin

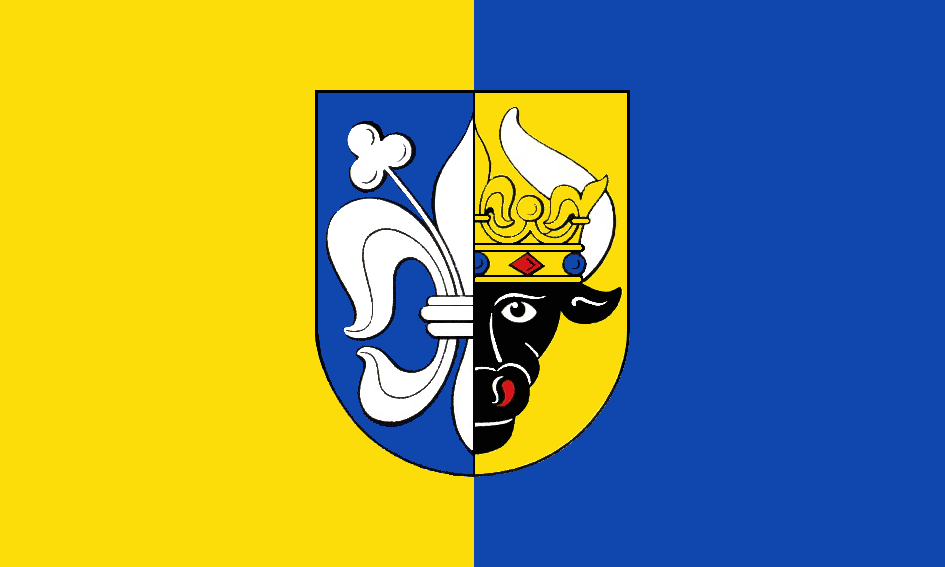
Gnoien

Greifswald

Grevesmühlen

Güstrow

Hagenow

Hohen Sprenz

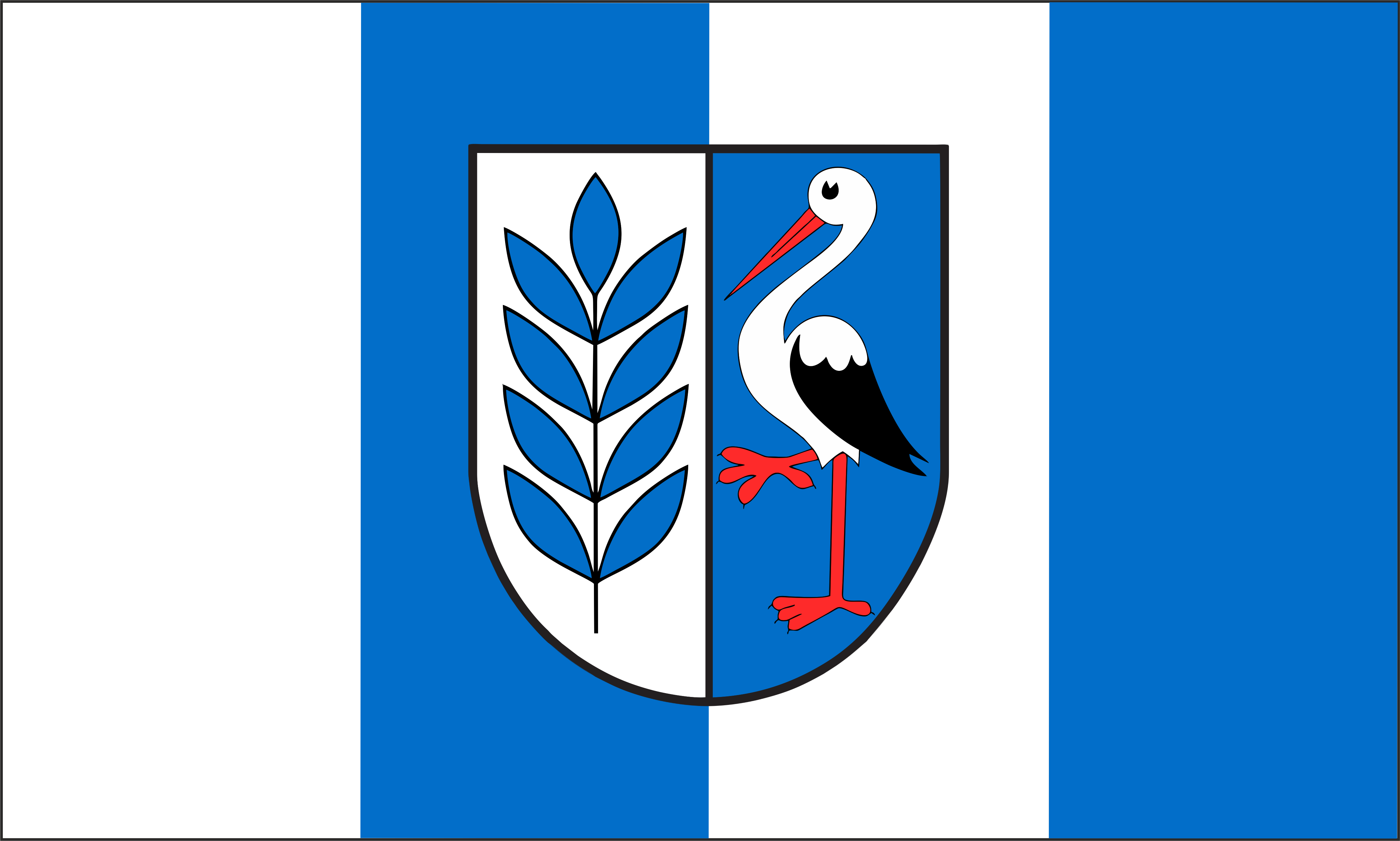
Jatznick

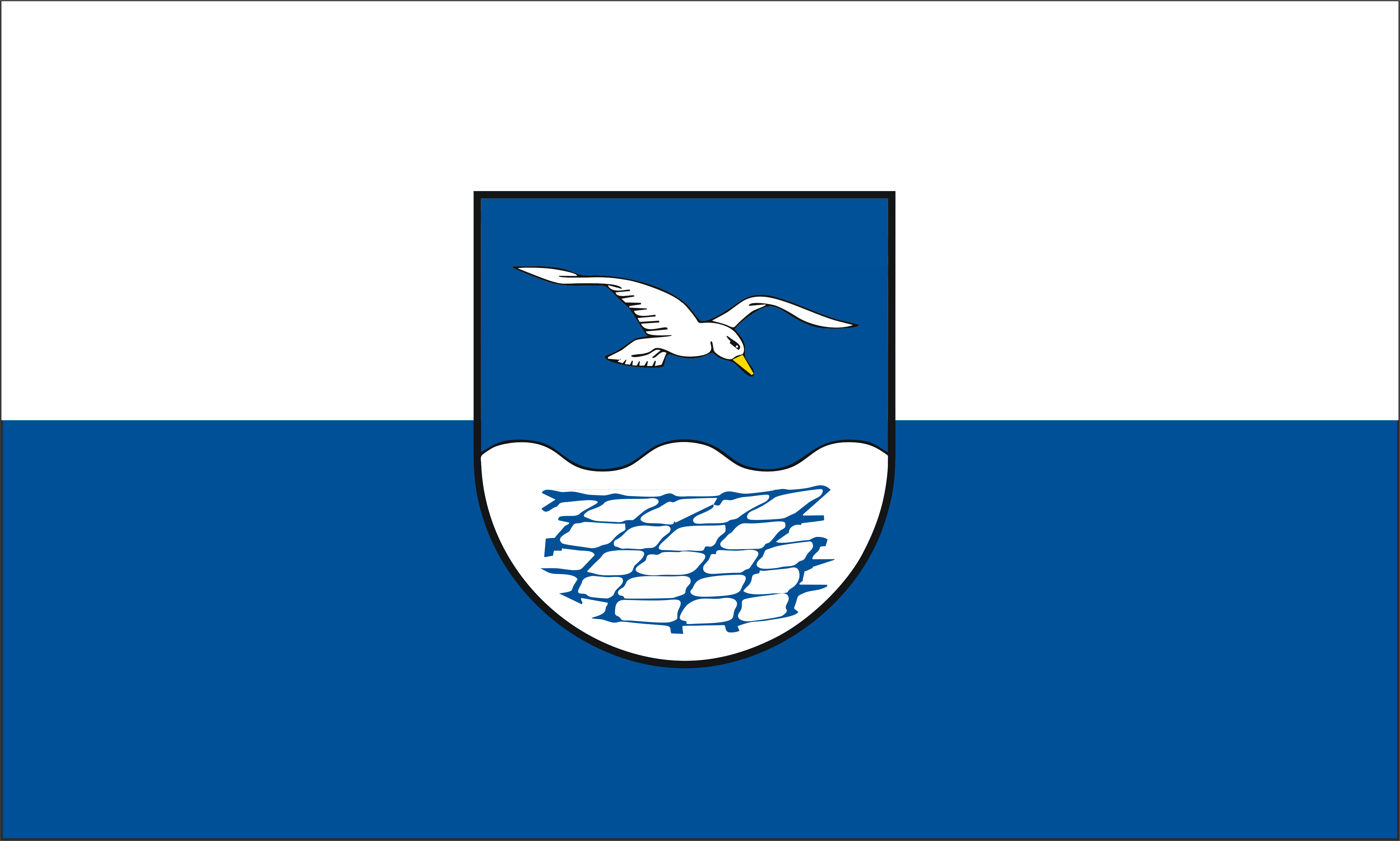
Karlshagen

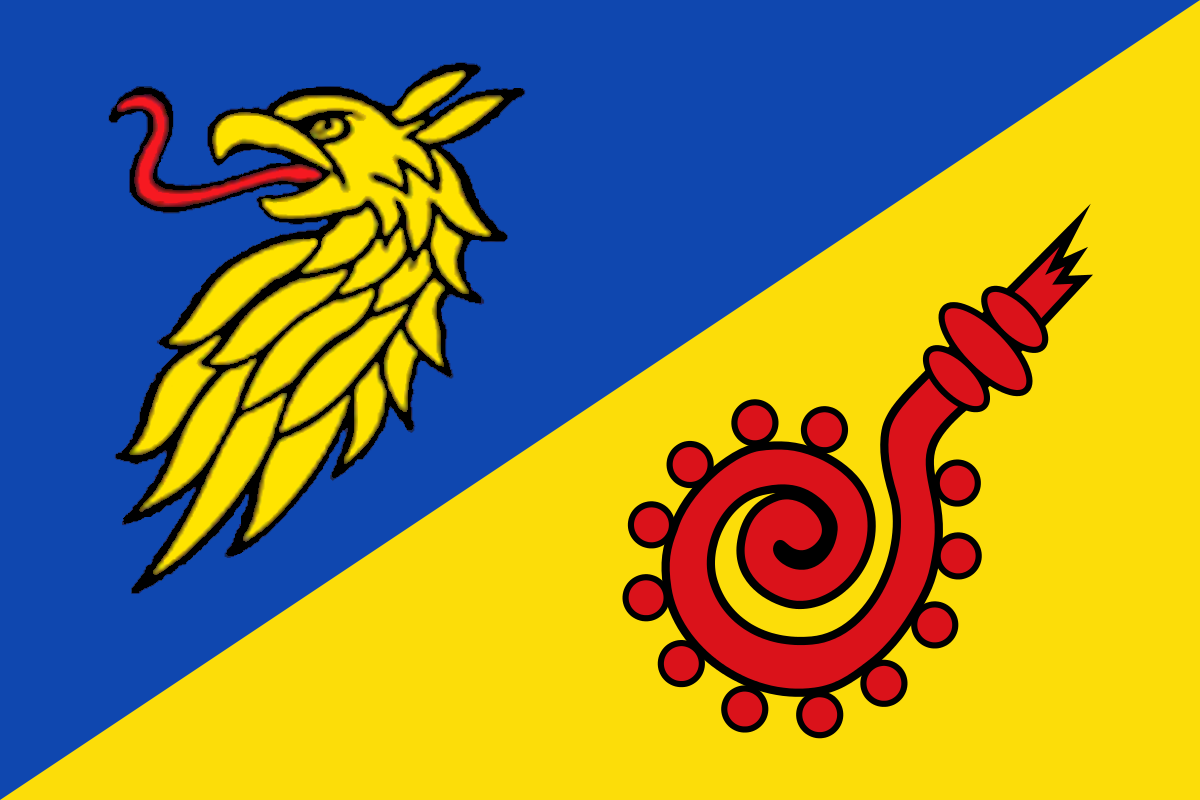
Kritzmow

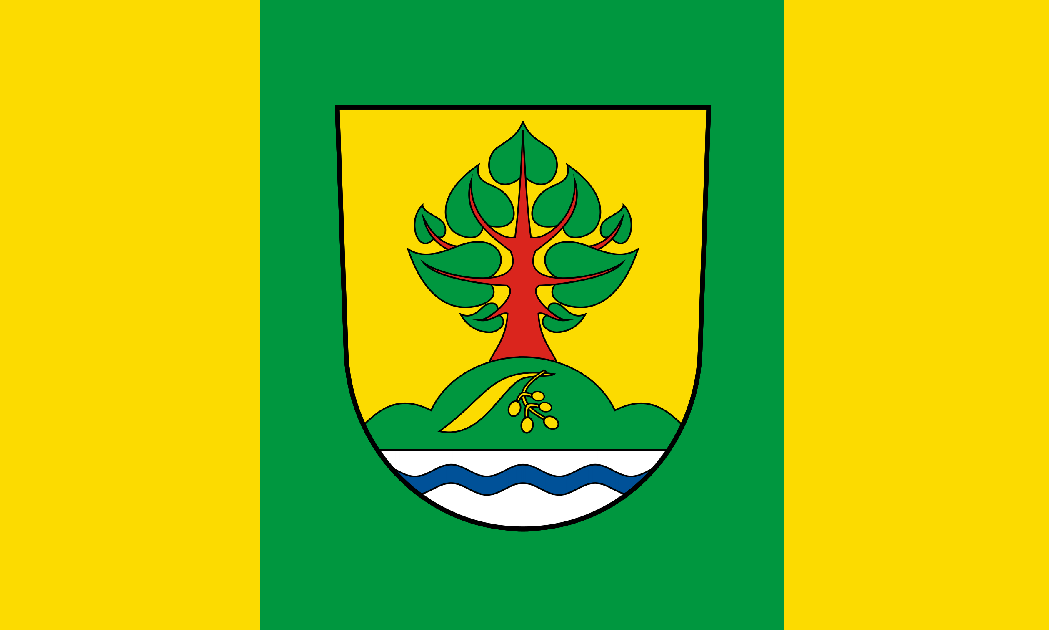
Liepgarten

Lubmin

Ludwigslust

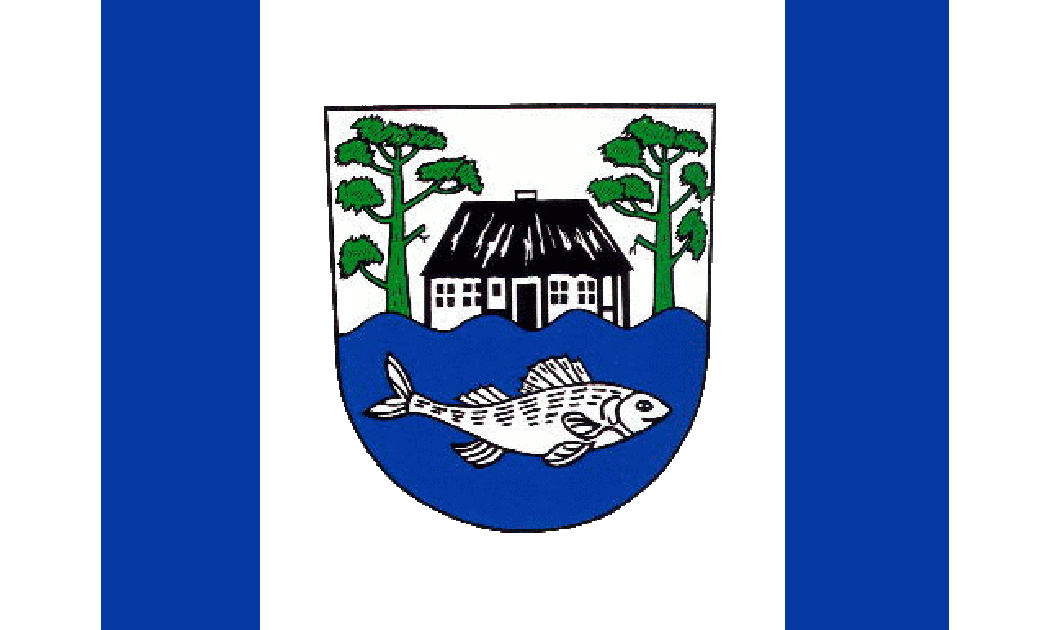
Mönkebude

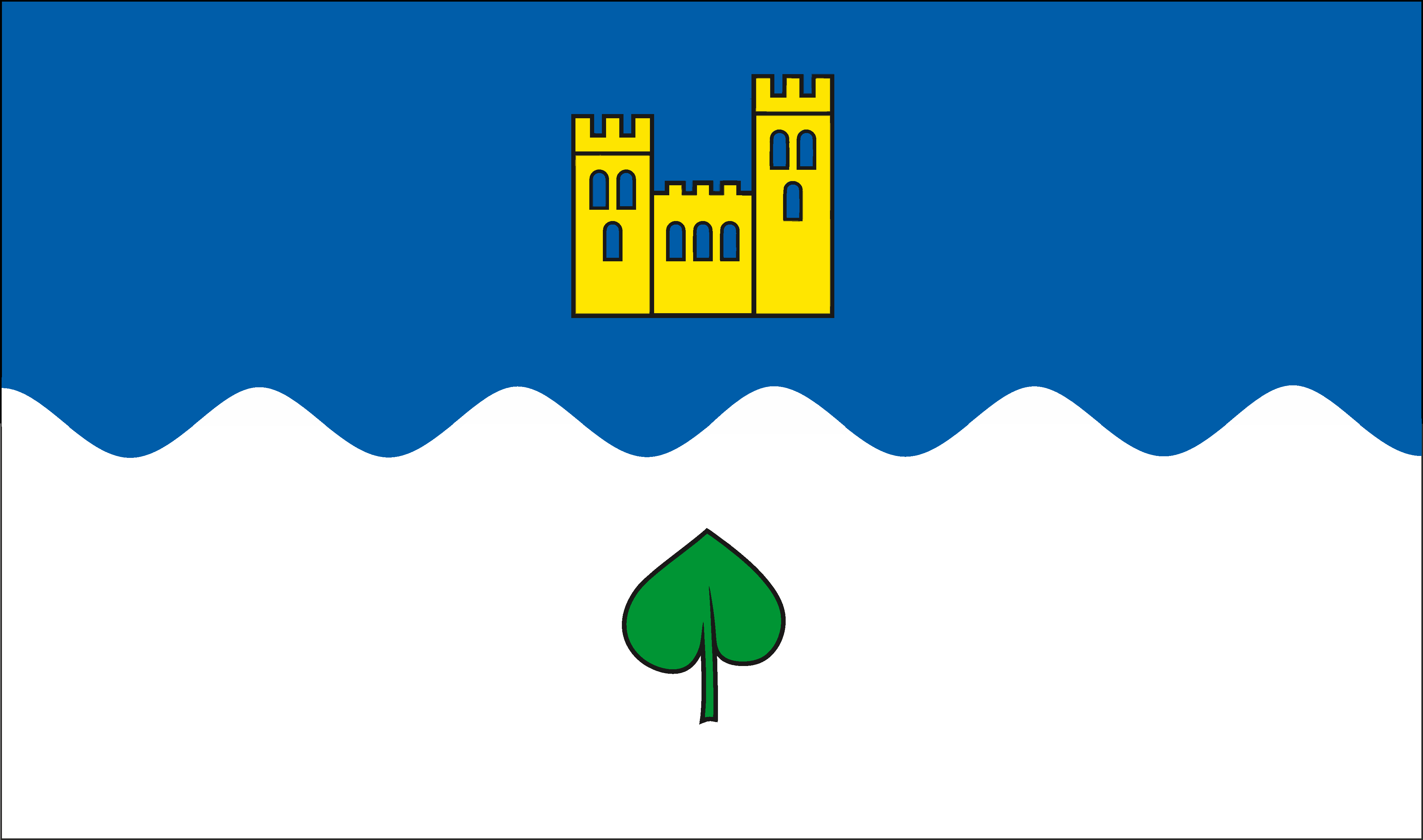
Neetzow-Liepen

Neuenkirchen

Neustadt-Glewe

Neustrelitz

Neverin

Parchim

Penzlin

Plau am See

Pölchow

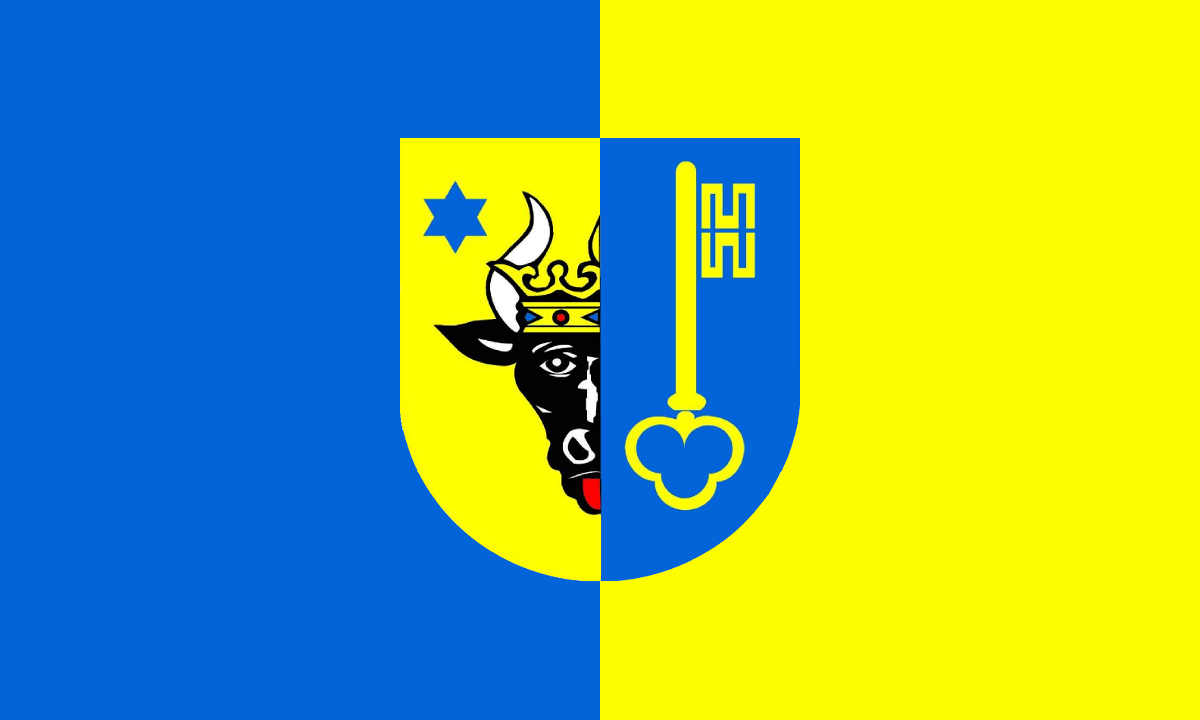
Röbel

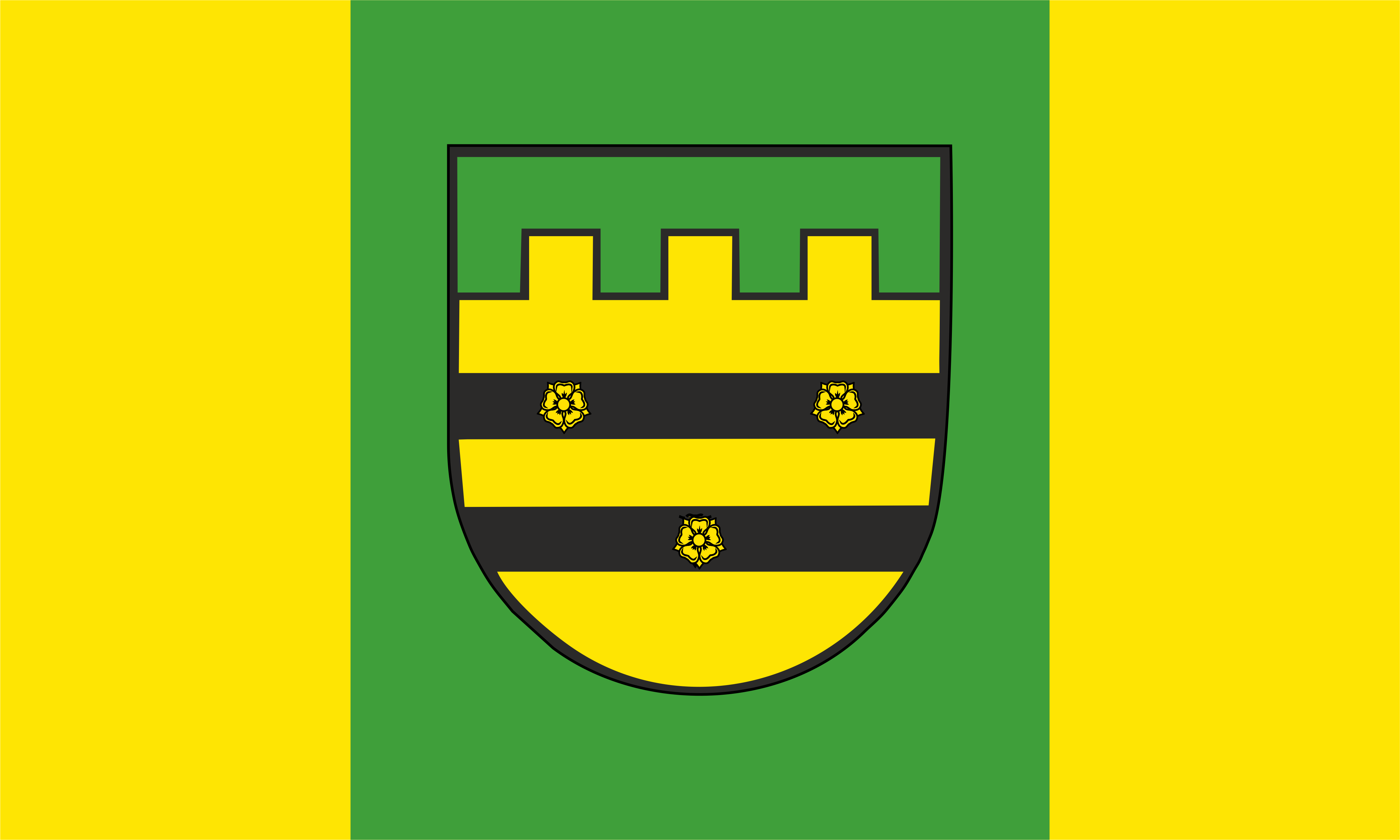
Rothenklempenow

Teterow

Torgelow

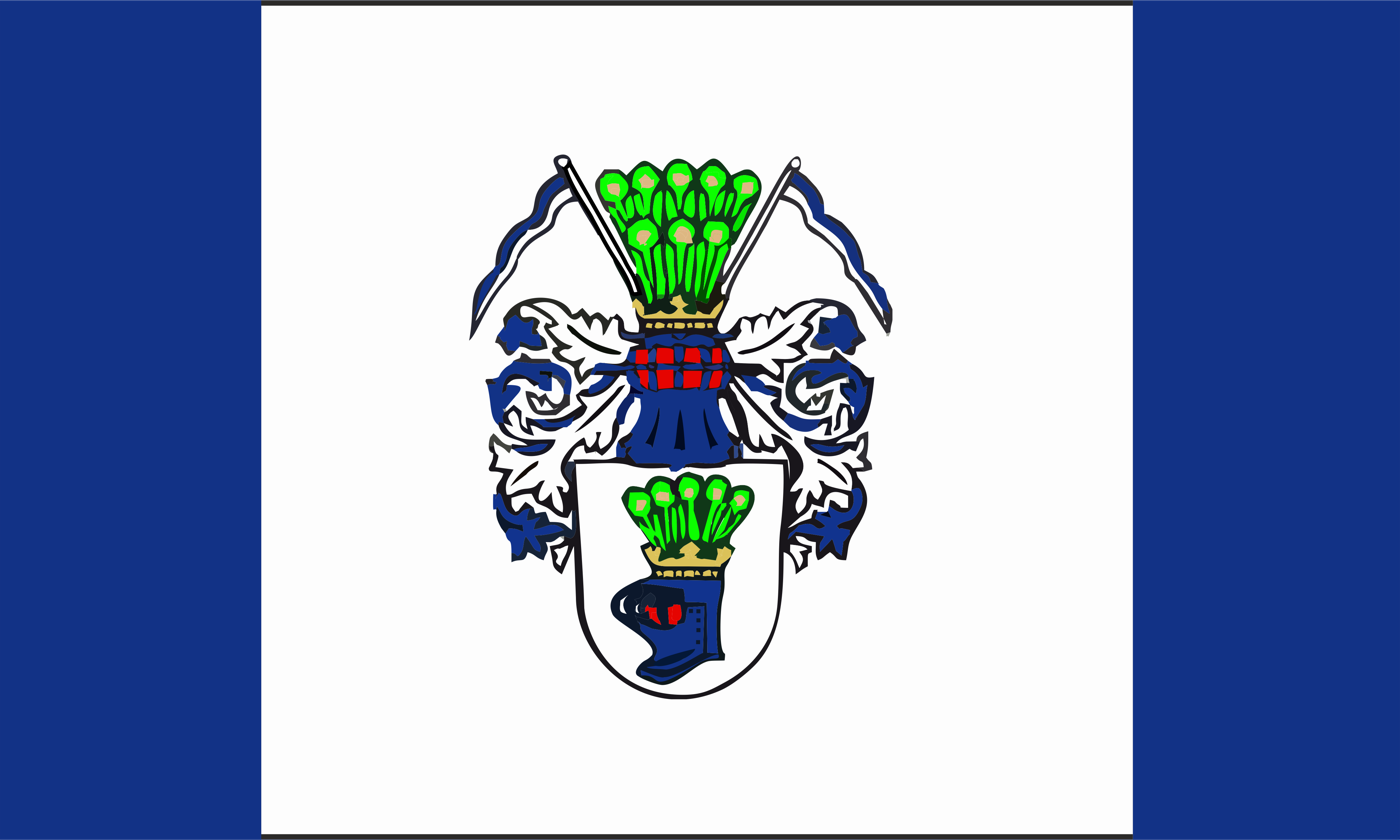
Usedom

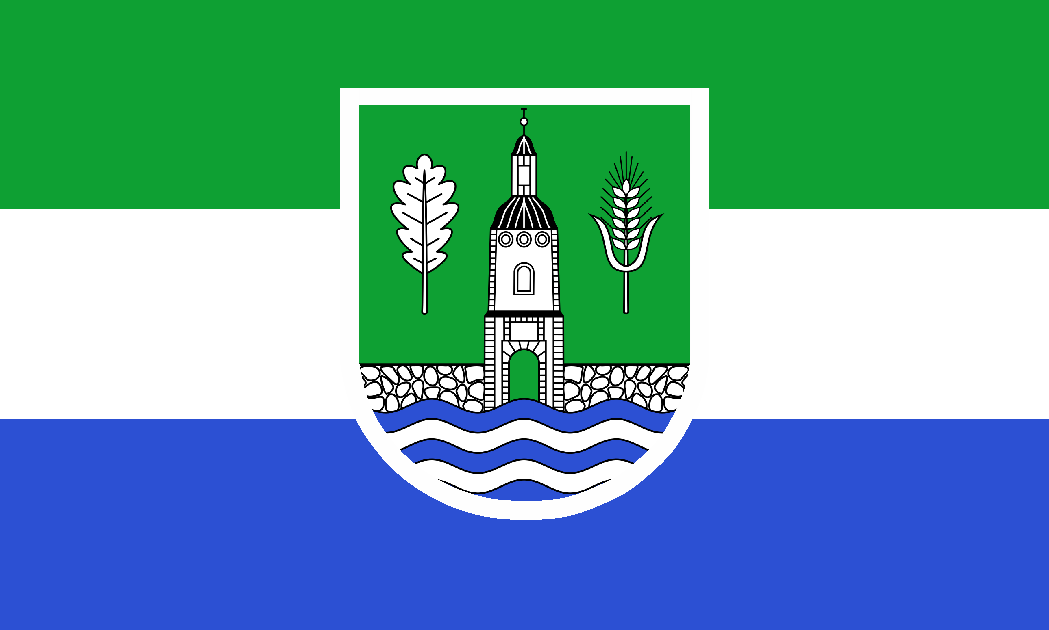
Vogelsang-Warsin

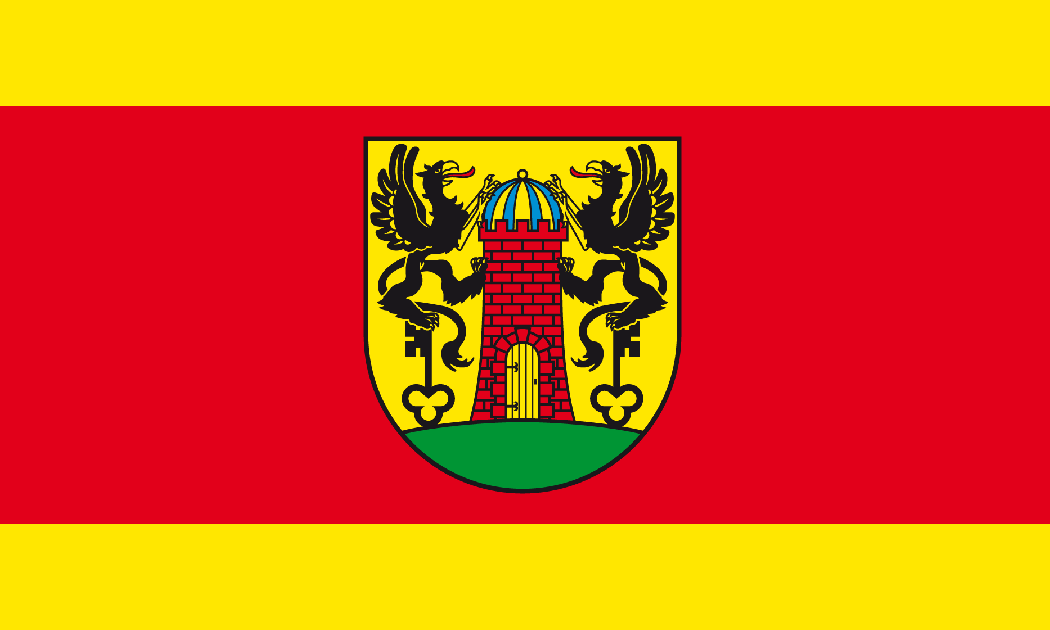
Wolgast

Wrangelsburg

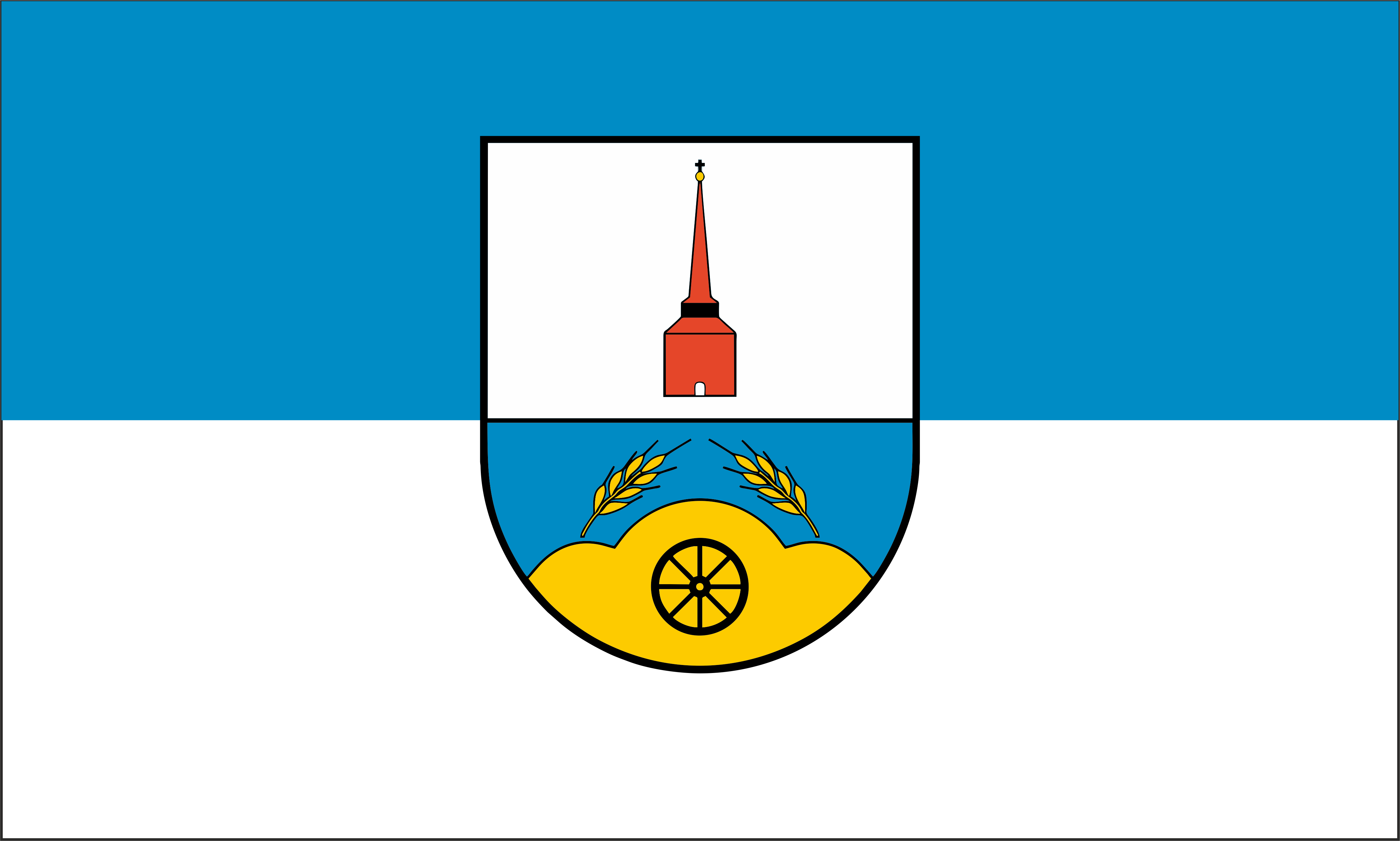
Zerrenthin

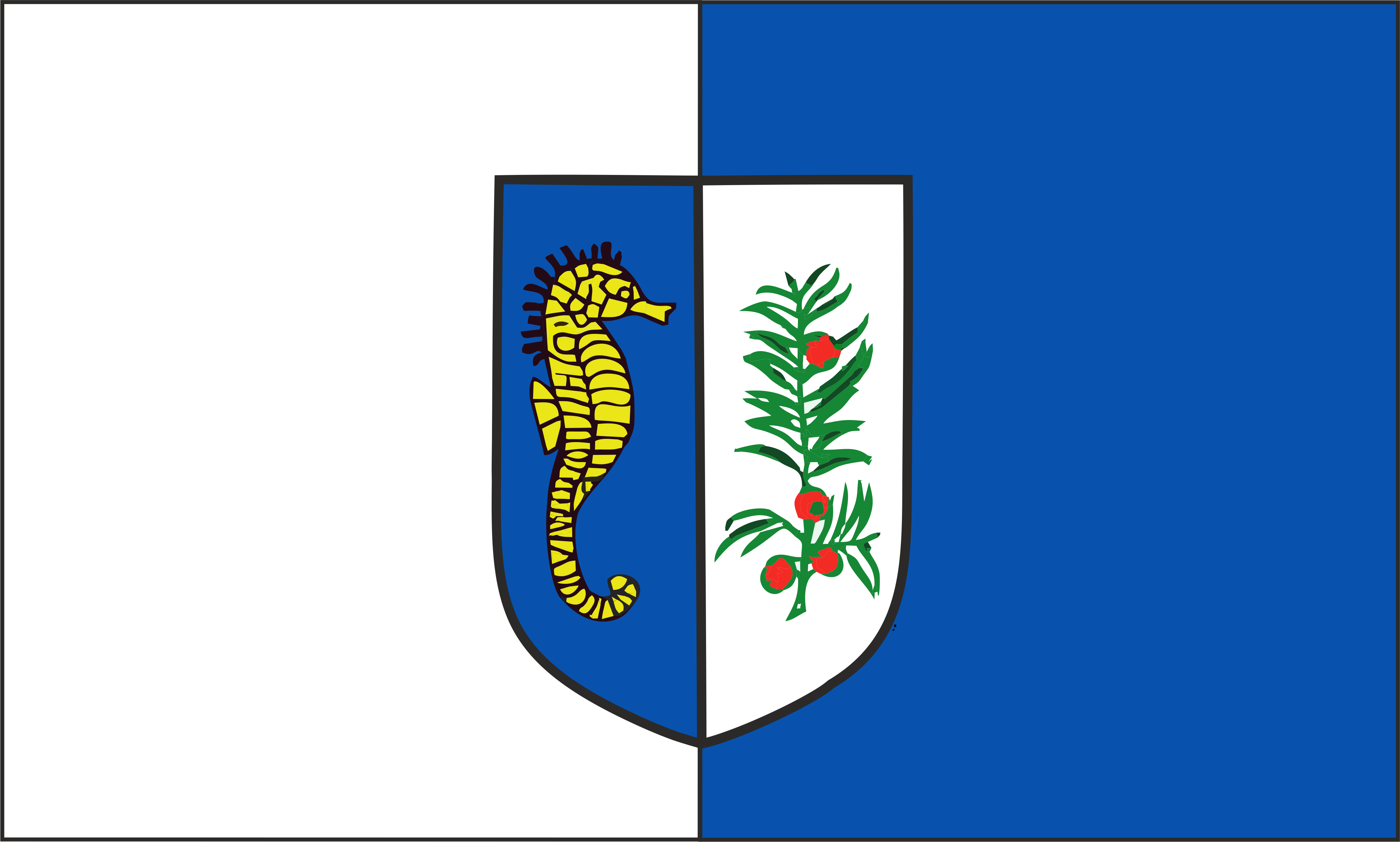
Zinnowitz

=== Historical ===
Rostock (14th century; Hanseatic flag)

Rostock (15th-18th centuries)

Rostock (18th century)

Rostock (19th century)

Rostock (19th century; variant 1)

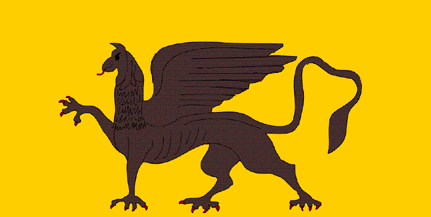
Rostock (19th century; variant 2)

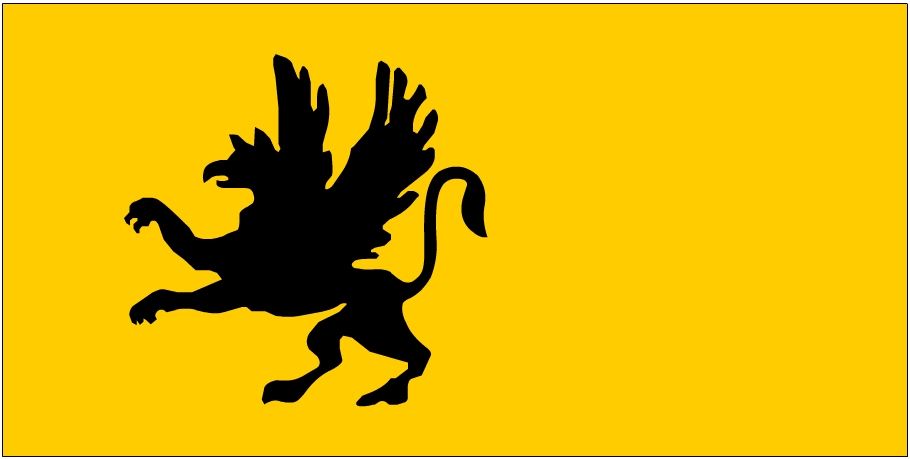
Rostock (19th century; variant 3)

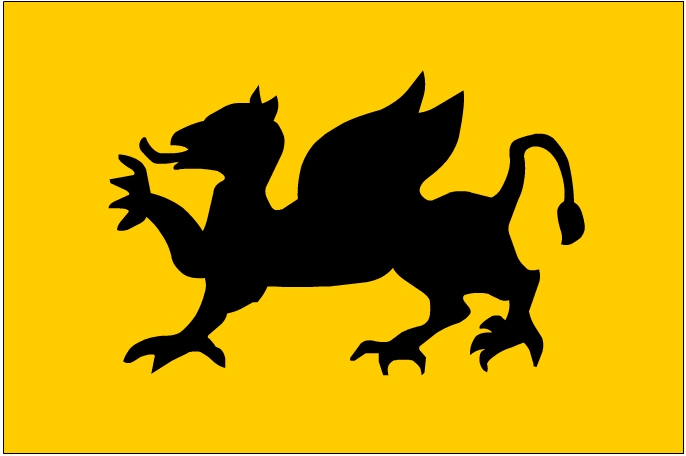
Rostock (19th century; variant 4)

Rostock (19th century; variant 5)

Stralsund (14th century; Hanseatic flag)

Wismar (15th century; Hanseatic flag)

== See also ==
- List of municipal flags of Western Germany
- List of municipal flags of Central Germany
- List of municipal flags of Eastern Germany
- List of municipal flags of Southern Germany
