= Maria Könning-de Siqueira Regueira =

German diplomat

Consul General of Germany in Recife
- In office 11 July 2016 – 26 June 2020
- President: Joachim Gauck; Frank‑Walter Steinmeier
- Chancellor: Angela Merkel
- Ambassador to Brazil: Dirk Brengelmann; Georg Witschel
- Preceded by: Dietmar Bock
- Succeeded by: Rainer Münzel

Personal details
- Born: Maria Könning; 24 March 1954 (age 72) Freren, West Germany
- Education: University of Freiburg; University of Paris; University of Bonn

Maria Könning-de Siqueira Regueira is a retired German diplomat who served as Consul General of Germany in Recife, Brazil from 2016 to 2020.

== Early life and education ==
Könning was born in Freren, in the Emsland region of Lower Saxony, West Germany. She studied Romance studies, history, philosophy, and political science at the Universities of Freiburg, Paris and Bonn.

== Diplomatic career ==
Könning joined the German foreign service and held various diplomatic assignments. Prior to her posting in Recife, she worked for approximately five years at the German Embassy in Brasília.

On 11 July 2016, she assumed office as Consul General of Germany in Recife. In this role, Könning was responsible for Germany's diplomatic representation in northeastern Brazil, covering the federal states of Alagoas, Bahia, Ceará, Maranhão, Paraíba, Pernambuco, Piauí, Rio Grande do Norte and Sergipe.

During her tenure, Könning promoted Germany-Brazil relations in areas such as education, renewable energy, and economic cooperation. She supported initiatives to expand German language teaching in Brazilian schools and fostered cultural and academic exchange. Könning also participated in diplomatic events and bilateral meetings with regional governments in northeastern Brazil, aiming to strengthen economic and cultural ties between Germany and Brazil.

== Personal life ==
Könning was married to Roberto Mariano de Siqueira Regueira, a Brazilian from the state of Pernambuco, until his death in 2023. They met in Germany, had three children and several grandchildren and have resided in Boa Viagem, Recife during her diplomatic posting.
