= Lists of German municipal flags =

The list of German municipal flags lists the flags of municipalities of Germany. Most municipalities of Germany have unique flags.

Like state flags, most of them are horizontal bicolors or tricolors, with or without the armorial shield or emblem (wappen). Therefore, the list will also discuss the emblems. Please note that some of the flags listed are either de facto flags, flags that are flown for local purposes or flags that are not yet approved by state interior ministries.

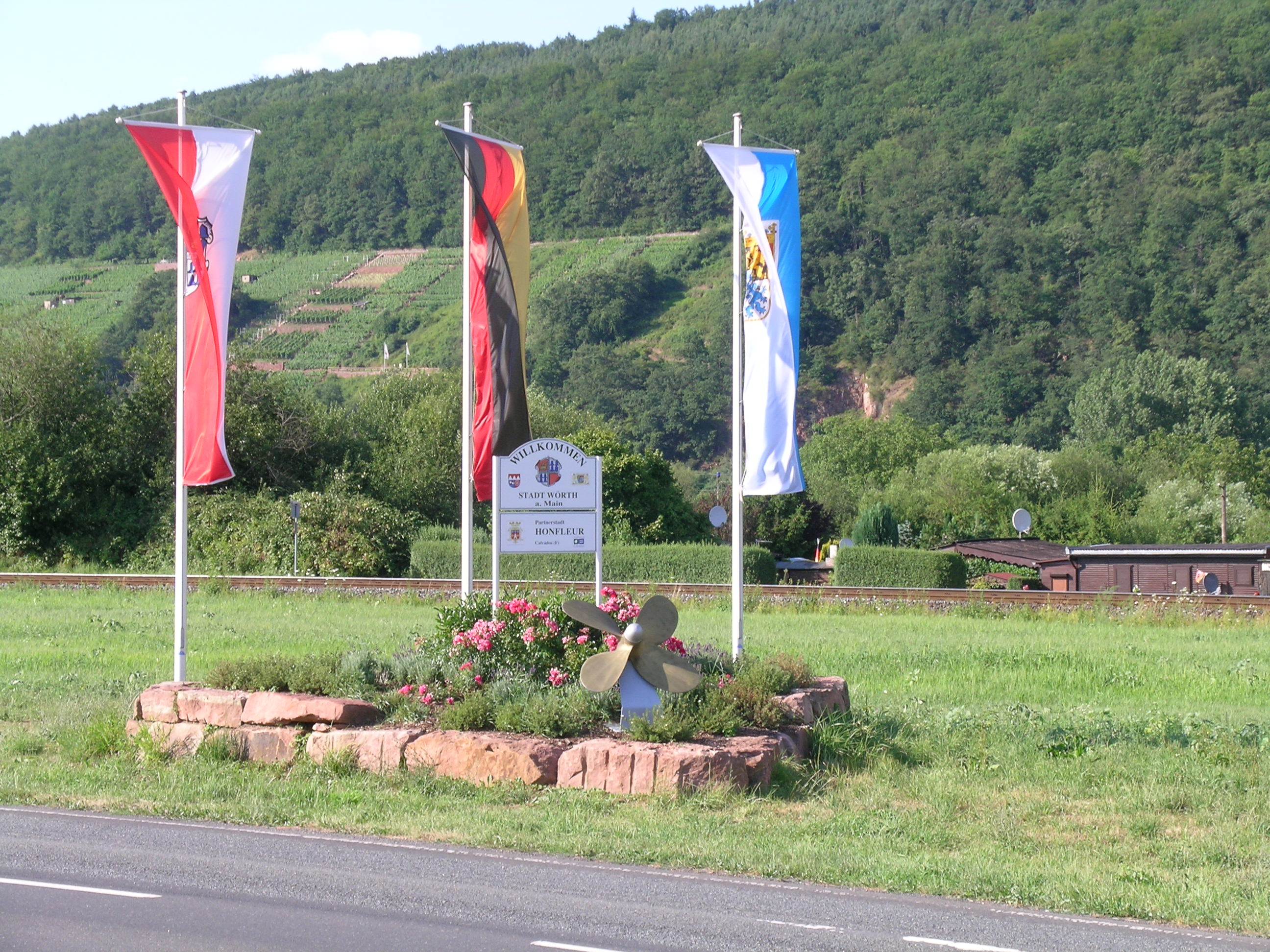
The German flag flying with the vertical flags of Bavaria and Wörth am Main

Due to its size, the list is sorted per states, select the state to navigate the municipal flags per state. Please note that some municipalities had either not adopted a flag yet or used a de facto flag.

== Flags of the Großstädte ==
Aachen, North Rhine-Westphalia

Augsburg, Bavaria

Aalen, Baden-Württemberg

Achim, Lower Saxony

Adenau, Rhineland-Palatinate

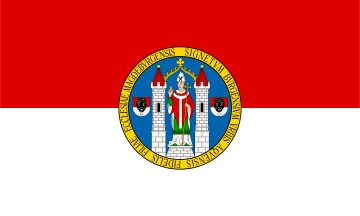
Aken, Saxony-Anhalt

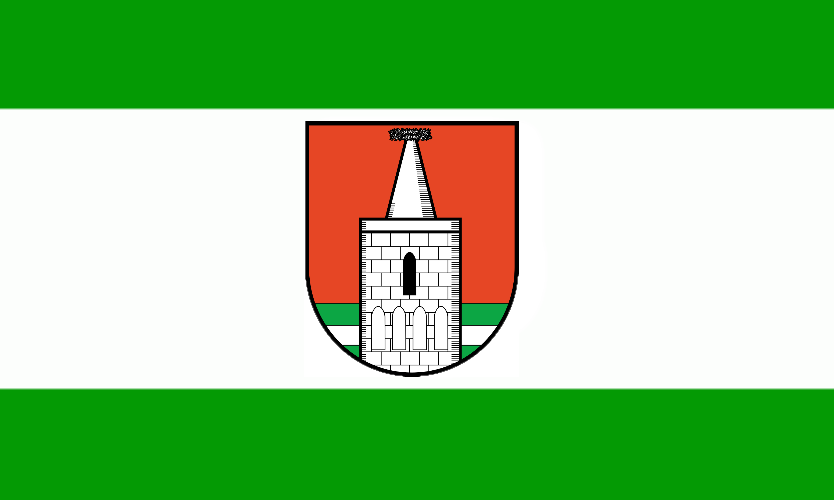
Altlandsberg, Brandenburg

Amberg, Bavaria

Ansbach, Bavaria

Arnis, Schleswig-Holstein

Arnsberg, Rhine-Westphalia

Arnstadt, Thuringia

Aschaffenburg, Bavaria

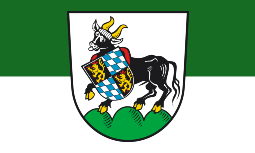
Aunerbach-Oberpfalz, Bavaria

Aurich, Lower Saxony

Bergisch Gladbach, North Rhine-Westphalia

Berlin

Bielefeld, North Rhine-Westphalia

Bochum, North Rhine-Westphalia

Bonn, North Rhine-Westphalia

Bottrop, North Rhine-Westphalia

Braunschweig, Lower Saxony

Bremen, Bremen

Bremerhaven, Bremen

Chemnitz, Saxony

Cologne, North Rhine-Westphalia

Darmstadt, Hesse

Dortmund, North Rhine-Westphalia

Dresden, Saxony

Duisburg, North Rhine-Westphalia

Düsseldorf, North Rhine-Westphalia

Erfurt, Thuringia

Essen, North Rhine-Westphalia

Erlangen, Bavaria

Frankfurt, Hesse

Freiburg im Breisgau, Baden-Württemberg

Fürth, Bavaria

Gelsenkirchen, North Rhine-Westphalia

Gera, Thuringia

Göttingen, Lower Saxony

Hagen, North Rhine-Westphalia

Hamburg

Hamm, North Rhine-Westphalia

Herne, North Rhine-Westphalia

Hanover, Lower Saxony

Heidelberg, Baden-Württemberg

Heilbronn, Baden-Württemberg

Hildesheim, Lower Saxony

Ingolstadt, Bavaria

Jena, Thuringia

Karlsruhe, Baden-Württemberg

Kassel, Hesse

Kiel, Schleswig-Holstein

Koblenz, Rhineland-Palatinate

Krefeld, North Rhine-Westphalia

Leverkusen, North Rhine-Westphalia

Ludwigshafen, Rhineland-Palatinate

Lübeck, Schleswig-Holstein

Mannheim, Baden-Württemberg

Moers, North Rhine-Westphalia

Mönchengladbach, North Rhine-Westphalia

Mülheim, North Rhine-Westphalia

Munich, Bavaria (striped variant)

Munich, Bavaria (lozengy variant)

Münster, North Rhine-Westphalia

Neuss, North Rhine-Westphalia

Nuremberg, Bavaria

Oberhausen, North Rhine-Westphalia

Offenbach am Main, Hesse

Oldenburg, Lower Saxony

Osnabrück, Lower Saxony

Pforzheim, Baden-Württemberg

Recklinghausen, North Rhine-Westphalia

Regensburg, Bavaria

Reutlingen, Baden-Württemberg

Rostock, Mecklenburg-Vorpommern

Saarbrücken, Saarland

Salzgitter, Lower Saxony

Siegen, North Rhine-Westphalia

Solingen, North Rhine-Westphalia

Stuttgart, Baden-Württemberg

Trier, Rhineland-Palatinate

Ulm, Baden-Württemberg

Witten, North Rhine-Westphalia

Wolfsburg, Lower Saxony

Wuppertal, North Rhine-Westphalia

Würzburg, Bavaria

Wörth am Main, Bavaria

== See also ==
- List of municipal flags of Central Germany
- List of municipal flags of Eastern Germany
- List of municipal flags of Northern Germany
- List of municipal flags of Southern Germany
- List of municipal flags of Western Germany
