= Freren (Samtgemeinde) =

- Samtgemeinde
- Location of Freren within Emsland district
- Interactive map of Freren
- Location within Germany Location within Lower Saxony
- Coordinates: 52°28′N 7°33′E
- Country: Germany
- State: Lower Saxony
- District: Emsland
- Seat: Freren
- Subdivisions: 5 municipalities

Area
  - Total: 132.22 km^{2} (51.05 sq mi)

Population (2025-12-31)
  - Total: 10,398
  - Density: 78.642/km^{2} (203.68/sq mi)
- Time zone: UTC+01:00 (CET)
  - Summer (DST): UTC+02:00 (CEST)
- Website: www.freren.de

Freren is a Samtgemeinde in the district Emsland in Lower Saxony, Germany. Its seat is in the town Freren.

The Samtgemeinde Freren consists of the following municipalities:

1. Andervenne
2. Beesten
3. Freren
4. Messingen
5. Thuine
