= List of municipal flags of Eastern Germany =

This page lists the municipal flags of Eastern Germany. It is a part of the Lists of German municipal flags, which is split into regions due to its size.

== Index by state ==
Click the states to browse the municipal flags

== Berlin ==
=== Cities ===
Municipality	Flag	Coat of arms	Enactment Date Abolition Date	Description
Berlin			1954	Main articles: Flag of Berlin and Coat of arms of Berlin The flag features red-white-red stripes with a black bear inside the white stripe.
Berlin			1954	Variant with the coat of arms.
Berlin	Berlin		1954	Vertical variant.
Berlin	Berlin		1954	Vertical variant.

=== Boroughs ===
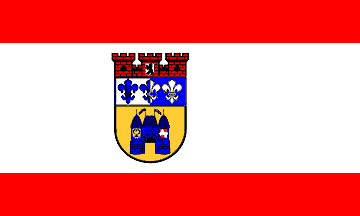
Charlottenburg-Wilmersdorf

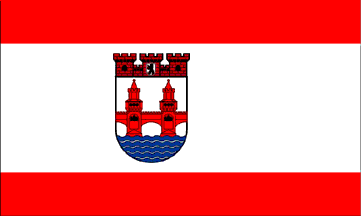
Friedrichshain-Kreuzberg

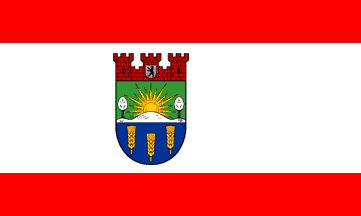
Lichtenberg

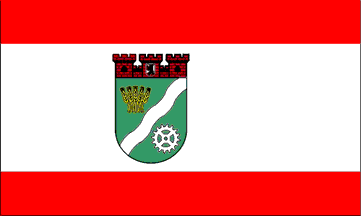
Marzahn-Hellersdorf

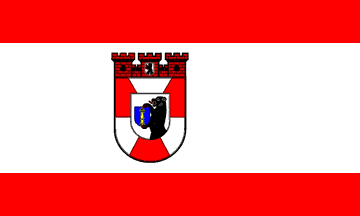
Mitte

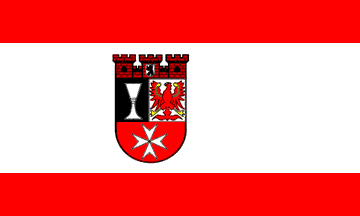
Neukölln

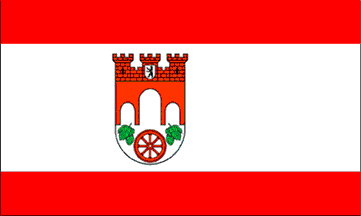
Pankow

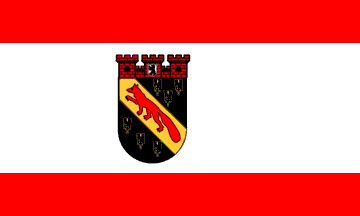
Reinickendorf

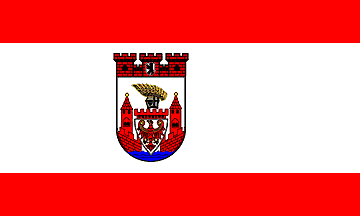
Spandau

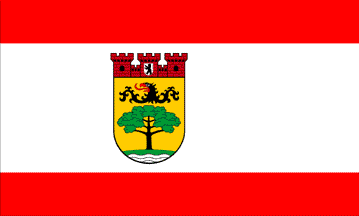
Steglitz-Zehlendorf

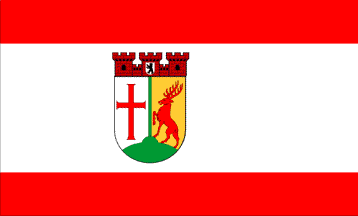
Tempelhof-Schöneberg

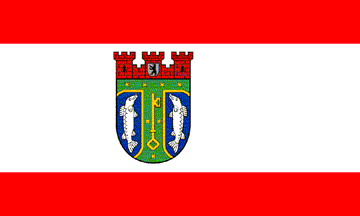
Treptow-Köpenick

=== Historical ===
Berlin (1618–1861)

Berlin (1861–1912)

Berlin (1934–1954)

East Berlin (1956–1990)

== Brandenburg ==
=== Cities ===
Cottbus

Potsdam

=== Towns and villages ===
Brandenburg an der Havel

Frankfurt (Oder)

Werneuchen

== Saxony ==
=== Cities ===
Chemnitz

Dresden

Leipzig

=== Towns and villages ===
Lommatzsch

== Saxony-Anhalt ==
=== Cities ===
Municipality	Flag	Coat of arms	Enactment Date Abolition Date	Description
Halle (Saale)			First adopted: 1327; Current form: 21 August 1996	A horizontal red and white flag with the coat of arms. The coat of arms probably comes from the provost seal of the local Augustinian monastery.The oldest surviving image of the coat of arms dates back to 1327, on which it is shown on a seal as a symbol of the valley jury court. For the later years, there are multiple representations of the coat of arms, of which in particular the oldest surviving one above the Moritztor at the Moritzburg and the representation of Lucas Fürttenagel on the bookplate of the Council Library, which shows the coat of arms for the first time in red on a white background. It is likely that it was used as the city's coat of arms from around the middle of the 15th century. There is no evidence of the meaning of the coat of arms. However, it can be assumed that the colors red and silver (white) can be traced back to the archbishopric of Magdeburg and the Hanseatic League. In contrast, the symbolic content of the coat of arms elements moon and stars is disputed because of their ambiguity. One of the oldest interpretations states that it is a stylized salt pan and salt crystals. Other assumptions relate to Byzantium or the Middle East or see a sun in one of the stars and thus the coat of arms as a symbol of day or the presence of God. More recent considerations, on the other hand, see symbols of justice in the elements of the coat of arms. A combination of the symbols with Marian devotion is usually favored, since the coat of arms was added to the council seal in the 14th century, which showed a Madonna. A legend reports that the Halloren asked the bishop to be allowed to build a city on the wooded banks of the Saale. Alluding to their poor condition, the bishop asked if they had found a good buyer for their rags to build cities with. But they replied: "If we take care of water and wood, then tomorrow we will have silver and gold." To which the bishop replied: "Build with water and wood, and may the sun, moon and stars shine on you!"

=== Towns and villages ===
Salzwedel

== See also ==
- List of municipal flags of Northern Germany
- List of municipal flags of Western Germany
- List of municipal flags of Central Germany
- List of municipal flags of Southern Germany
