= List of municipal flags of Southern Germany =

This page lists the municipal flags of Southern Germany. It is a part of the Lists of German municipal flags, which is split into regions due to its size.

== Index by state ==
Click the states to browse the municipal flags

== Baden-Württemberg ==
=== Cities ===
Municipality	Flag	Coat of arms	Enactment Date Abolition Date	Description	Ref.
Freiburg im Breisgau			Coat of arms: 1327; Flag: 1368	The coat of arms of the city of Freiburg shows a red cross on a white background. It is the attribute of St. George, the city's oldest patron. The city seal shows a stylized castle in red on a white background with two tower brass on the outer towers. This seal is only represented sporadically in color throughout the city; On the other hand, this depiction, cast in iron, is more often seen on the manhole covers in the city center. The stylized castle served as a model for the Freiburg moated castle built in the Sternwald in 1896. You can often see a coat of arms with a black eagle or raven head on a gold background. This coat of arms was created after 1327 from the Freiburg mint mark. Initially, the coins minted in Freiburg showed the outstretched eagle, i.e. the coat of arms of the Counts of Freiburg. After the Freiburgers bought the minting rights from the counts in 1327, the city minted coins that only showed the head of an eagle to distinguish them. This was soon seen as the head of a raven (Alemannic “rappen”), which is why the small coin was also called a “rappenpfennig”. In 1399, Freiburg and other Upper Rhine cities such as. B. Basel formed the Rappenmünzbund to facilitate trade among themselves. The Rappenpfennig gave its name to the Swiss black horse. The city coat of arms is often shown together with the coat of arms of Austria on historical buildings or in paintings, a reference to the city's long affiliation with Upper Austria. The flag of the city of Freiburg shows, as in the coat of arms, the St. George's Cross, a red continuous cross on a white background. It is identical to the flag of England, whose patron saint, like in Freiburg, is St. George. It is primarily flown as an upright flag, but can also be seen horizontally. This flag has been used since around 1368, when Freiburg came to the Habsburgs.	
Heilbronn			1265	A red-white-blue horizontal tricolor. The coat of arms is gold with a red-armored and red-tongued black imperial eagle with a breastplate divided into red, white and blue. The eagle is the symbol of the imperial immediacy of the former imperial city. It appears on the triangular seal, which has been detectable since 1265, and recurs on all later seals. In addition to this "large insignia", a smaller round seal can be found for the year 1361 and a secretary seal since 1453, which was also referred to as the "large Insigel" in 1498 and seems to have taken its place since the middle of the 16th century. Only slightly different from this seal is a replica that was created in 1680 according to the note on the seal stamp. On smaller letter seals from the 17th and 18th centuries, the eagle is covered with a breastplate with the letters HB. A breastplate divided by red, silver and blue appears on the 18th century chancery seal, on the 1764 sinking seal, on the 1803 seal and the later city seals. The printing blocks of the oldest seal, the secretary seal and the chancellery seal from the 18th century were destroyed in the Second World War. Colored representations of the coat of arms have been known since the second half of the 15th century. The main banner of the imperial cities from 1462 shows the black eagle in a silver field for Heilbronn. The coat of arms also appears in Siebmacher's coat of arms book from 1605 and - probably based on this - in coats of arms books of the 18th century. In Heilbronn itself, where the coat of arms window from 1487 from St. Kilian's Church is the oldest evidence of the colors of the city's coat of arms, the eagle always stood in a golden shield, as in the coat of arms of the empire.	

Flag	City	Date	Description
	Karlsruhe	1895 – present	A red-yellow-red horizontal bicolor.
	Mannheim	1613 – present	A blue-white-red horizontal tricolor.
	Offenburg	1260 – present	A red-white horizontal bicolor with the coat of arms.
	Pforzheim	18th century – present	A white-blue horizontal bicolor with the coat of arms. The dexter represents Baden. The yellow also represents Baden and the white and blue is said to have come from the House of Wittelsbach.
	Reutlingen	1462 – present	A black-red-white horizontal tricolor with the Reichsadler (imperial eagle).
	Stuttgart	1950 – present	A black-yellow horizontal bicolor with the coat of arms. The coat of arms is a reference to a legend in which Liudolf, Duke of Swabia founded a ranch, a horse breeding center and riding school on where the city is located now.
	Ulm	1244 – present	A black-white horizontal bicolor. The meaning of the colours is still unknown til this day.

=== Towns and villages ===
Flag	City	Date	Description
	Baden-Baden	1421 – present	The yellow-red-yellow horizontal flag with the coat of arms.
	Heidelberg	1938 – present	A black-yellow horizontal bicolor.
	Ofterdingen	6 June 1982 – present	A yellow-blue horizontal bicolor with the coat of arms.

== Bavaria ==
=== Bezirk ===
Lower Franconia

Middle Franconia

Swabia

Upper Bavaria (not official)

Upper Bavaria (in use)

Upper Franconia

Upper Palatinate

=== Cities ===
Augsburg

Ansbach

Erlangen

Fürth

Ingolstadt

Munich (striped variant)

Munich (lozengy variant)

Nuremberg

Passau

Regensburg

Regensburg (banner)

Rosenheim

Schwabach

Schweinfurt

Straubing

Weiden in der Oberpfalz

Würzburg

=== Aichach-Friedberg ===
Municipality	Flag	Coat of arms	Enactment Date	Description	Ref.
Aichach			Coat of arms: 14th century Flag: Not yet approved	A blue-white horizontal striped flag. The coat of arms represent the origin of the municipality's name (“settlement near the oak forest”). Imprints of the oldest seal with the inscription SIGILLUM CIVIVM IN AICHACH, which have been handed down since 1315, already show the oak tree. Aichach, the Wittelsbach capital in the Paar area, was mentioned as a town as early as the 13th century. In 1347, Emperor Ludwig the Bavarian granted her the privileges and the law book of Munich. The seal image changed over the years. From 1721 it shows a natural oak tree standing on a hill. In the early 16th century, blue was mentioned as the field color. The colors known today have been used since 1560, with a brief interruption: from around 1910, the shield was mistakenly divided into silver and red. The coat of arms has existed in its current version since 1949.	
Friedberg			Coat of arms: 1264; Vertical flag: 1964; Hortizonal flag: Not yet approved	A red-white-blue striped flag. The representation of the Sechsberg indicates the settlement in the hill country, with the blue background establishing a connection to the Duchy of Bavaria and the House of Wittelsbach. The cross in the middle symbolizes Marktfrieden and thus also includes the city name. The jurisdiction and case law in Friedberg is symbolized by the lilies arranged on both sides.	

=== Towns and villages ===
Aschaffenburg

Bad Grönenbach

Bamberg

Bayreuth

Coburg

Emskirchen

Geretsried

Günzburg

Kaufbeuren

Kempten

Landshut

Memmingen

Poing

== See also ==
- List of municipal flags of Northern Germany
- List of municipal flags of Western Germany
- List of municipal flags of Central Germany
- List of municipal flags of Eastern Germany
