= Hohenkirchen (Wangerland) =

- Ortsteil of Wangerland
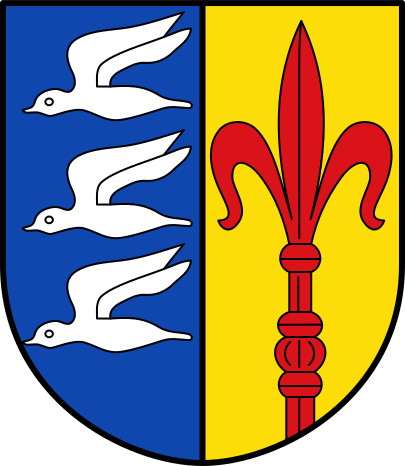
- Coat of arms
- Interactive map of Hohenkirchen
- Location within Germany Location within Lower Saxony
- Coordinates: 53°39′N 07°54′E
- Country: Germany
- State: Lower Saxony
- District: Friesland
- Municipality: Wangerland
- Elevation: 2 m (6.6 ft)

Population (2011)
  - Total: 1,530
- Time zone: UTC+01:00 (CET)
  - Summer (DST): UTC+02:00 (CEST)
- Postal codes: 26434
- Dialling codes: 04463
- Vehicle registration: FRI
- Website: www.hohenkirchen.de

Hohenkirchen (German pronunciation: [hoːənˈkɪʁçn̩]) is a village in the municipality of Wangerland in district of Friesland in Lower Saxony. The village is the administrative center of the municipality of Wangerland, formed in 1971.
