= Wulften am Harz =

- Municipality
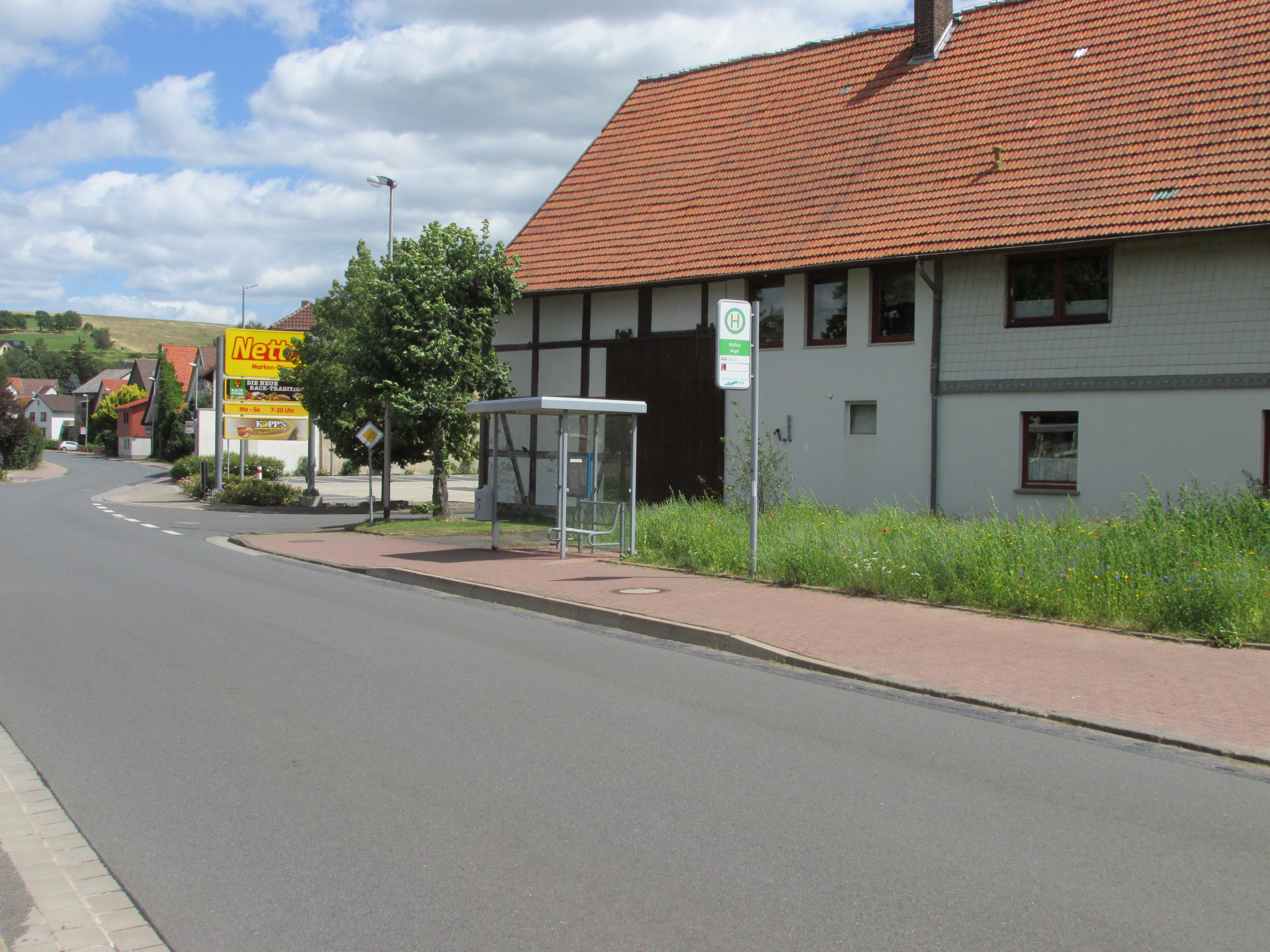

- Flag Coat of arms

- Location of Wulften am Harz within Göttingen district
- Interactive map of Wulften am Harz
- Location within Germany Location within Lower Saxony
- Coordinates: 51°39′46″N 10°10′36″E
- Country: Germany
- State: Lower Saxony
- District: Göttingen
- Municipal assoc.: Hattorf am Harz

Government
  - Mayor: Henning Kruse (SPD)

Area
  - Total: 14.81 km^{2} (5.72 sq mi)
- Elevation: 157 m (515 ft)

Population (2025-12-31)
  - Total: 1,795
  - Density: 121.2/km^{2} (313.9/sq mi)
- Time zone: UTC+01:00 (CET)
  - Summer (DST): UTC+02:00 (CEST)
- Postal codes: 37199
- Dialling codes: 05556
- Vehicle registration: GÖ, OHA
- Website: www.wulftenamharz.de

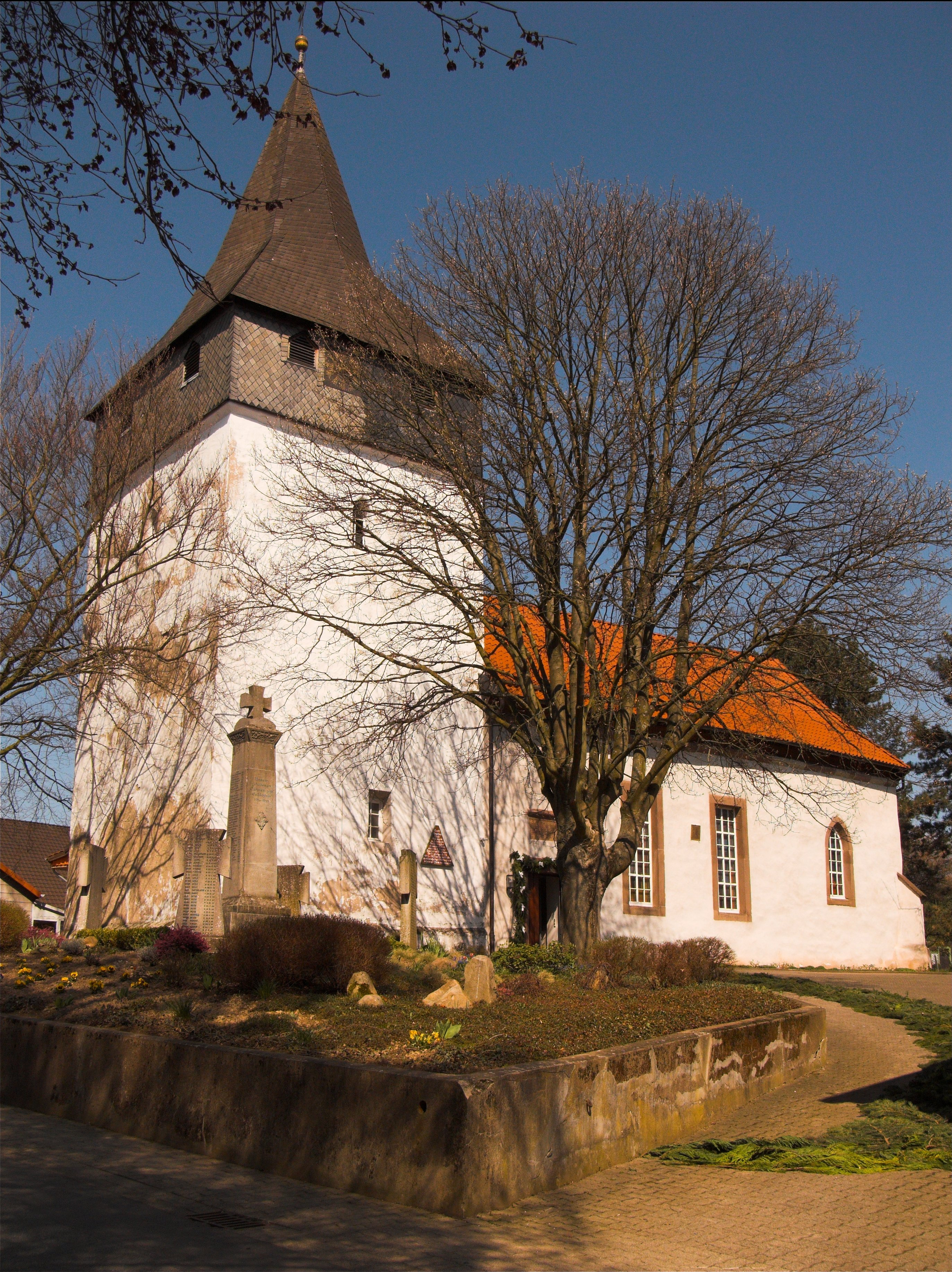
The St. Aegidien-Church in Wulften

Wulften am Harz is a municipality in Lower Saxony, Germany, near the towns of Northeim and Osterode am Harz.

== Geography ==
Wulften am Harz lies on the south western edge of the Harz mountains and on the north western end of the Rotenberg hills. The Oder river flows past the village. The nearest towns are Osterode am Harz (12 km), Herzberg am Harz (15 km) and Göttingen (30 km).

== History ==
- Wulften am Harz was mentioned for the first time in the year 889: the East Frankish king Arnulf of Carinthia granted Adalgar, the Gaugraf of Lisgau the villages of Kalefeld and Wulften (6 July 889).
- In 1502 the St. Aegidienkirche was established under the patronage of Hardenberg nobles.
- In 1567 Wulften came under the rule of the Welfen principality of Grubenhagen. Wulften became integrated with the church offices in Herzberg am Harz and the Reformation led to the population becoming Lutheran (in 2004, 78.5%).
- In 1626 Johann t'Serclaes von Tilly, heading to the battle of Lutter am Barenberge crossed the Oder River at Wulften. There was repeated plundering here during the Thirty Years War.
- In the Seven Years' War of 1756-63 the St. Aegidienkirche church was damaged.
- 1807-1813 Wulften belonged to the kingdom of Westphalia (Département of Harz; 1815-1866 to the kingdom of Hanover, 1866-1946 to the Prussian province of Hanover and since 1946 to the Bundesland of Lower Saxony.
- On 1 December 1868 Wulften gained railway access when the Northeim-Herzberg am Harz railway (later called the Südharzstrecke) opened. The Wulften-Duderstadt railway opened on 31 October 1889.
- In 1933 Nazi rule came to Wulften: on 7 July 1933 all German Democratic Party members of the community council were dismissed by police order. The Nazi regime ended in Wulften on 10 April 1945 with the liberation by soldiers of the 9th US Army.
- From 1972 the Gemeinde of Wulften became part of the Samtgemeinde of Hattorf am Harz.
- From 1 October 2004 the village has had the official name Wulften am Harz.

== Politics ==
On 1 November 2006 eight councillors from the Social Democratic Party of Germany (SPD) and five from the Christian Democratic Union (CDU) parties were elected. The Bürgermeister is Henning Kruse (SPD).

== Industry ==
In Wulften there are two regionally important businesses:

- Ehrhardt Reifen und Autoservice (motor vehicle services)
- Gebr. Gropengiesser, Bauunternehmen und Kieswerke (construction)

== Literature ==
- D. Greunig (et al.): Wulften am Harz: ein Streifzug durch die Vergangenheit; 1100 Jahre; 889–1989. Horb am Neckar 1989
- D. Witte: 1591–1991: Kirchengeschichte der ev. luth. Kirchengemeinde Wulften am Harz. Duderstadt 1991
