= Elbingerode, Lower Saxony =

Elbingerode
- Municipality
- Flag Coat of arms

- Location of Elbingerode within Göttingen district
- Interactive map of Elbingerode
- Location within Germany Location within Lower Saxony
- Coordinates: 51°39′33″N 10°16′45″E
- Country: Germany
- State: Lower Saxony
- District: Göttingen
- Municipal assoc.: Hattorf am Harz

Government
  - Mayor: Karin Wode

Area
  - Total: 5.65 km^{2} (2.18 sq mi)
- Elevation: 200 m (660 ft)

Population (2025-12-31)
  - Total: 432
  - Density: 76.5/km^{2} (198/sq mi)
- Time zone: UTC+01:00 (CET)
  - Summer (DST): UTC+02:00 (CEST)
- Postal codes: 37412
- Dialling codes: 05521
- Vehicle registration: GÖ, OHA
- Website: www.elbingero.de

Elbingerode (German pronunciation: [ɛlbɪŋəˈʁoːdə]) is a municipality in the district of Göttingen, in Lower Saxony, Germany.

== Geography ==
=== Geographical location ===
Elbingerode is in the Harz National Park near the Sieber river. Elbingerode belongs to the municipality of Hattorf am Harz. The village is in the immediate proximity of Bundesstraße 27, which results from Göttingen to Blankenburg.
