= Messingen =

- Municipality
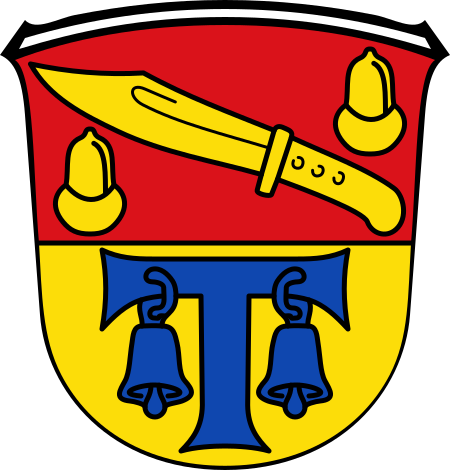
- Flag Coat of arms

- Location of Messingen within Emsland district
- Interactive map of Messingen
- Location within Germany Location within Lower Saxony
- Coordinates: 52°28′N 07°28′E
- Country: Germany
- State: Lower Saxony
- District: Emsland
- Municipal assoc.: Freren

Government
  - Mayor: Ansgar Mey (CDU)

Area
  - Total: 25.43 km^{2} (9.82 sq mi)
- Elevation: 34 m (112 ft)

Population (2025-12-31)
  - Total: 1,118
  - Density: 43.96/km^{2} (113.9/sq mi)
- Time zone: UTC+01:00 (CET)
  - Summer (DST): UTC+02:00 (CEST)
- Postal codes: 49832
- Dialling codes: 0 59 05
- Vehicle registration: EL
- Website: www.messingen.de

Messingen is a municipality in the Emsland district, in Lower Saxony, Germany.
