= Hörden am Harz =

- Municipality
- Coat of arms

- Location of Hörden am Harz within Göttingen district
- Interactive map of Hörden am Harz
- Location within Germany Location within Lower Saxony
- Coordinates: 51°40′15″N 10°17′07″E
- Country: Germany
- State: Lower Saxony
- District: Göttingen
- Municipal assoc.: Hattorf am Harz

Government
  - Mayor: Henning Kunstin (CDU)

Area
  - Total: 7.82 km^{2} (3.02 sq mi)
- Elevation: 200 m (660 ft)

Population (2025-12-31)
  - Total: 902
  - Density: 115/km^{2} (299/sq mi)
- Time zone: UTC+01:00 (CET)
  - Summer (DST): UTC+02:00 (CEST)
- Postal codes: 37412
- Dialling codes: 05521
- Vehicle registration: GÖ, OHA
- Website: www.hoerden-harz.de

Hörden am Harz is a municipality in the district of Göttingen, in Lower Saxony, Germany.
