= Hattorf am Harz (Samtgemeinde) =

- Samtgemeinde
- Coat of arms

- Location of Hattorf am Harz within Göttingen district
- Interactive map of Hattorf am Harz
- Location within Germany Location within Lower Saxony
- Coordinates: 51°39′N 10°14′E
- Country: Germany
- State: Lower Saxony
- District: Göttingen
- Seat: Hattorf am Harz
- Subdivisions: 4 municipalities

Area
  - Total: 57.48 km^{2} (22.19 sq mi)

Population (2025-12-31)
  - Total: 7,100
  - Density: 120/km^{2} (320/sq mi)
- Time zone: UTC+01:00 (CET)
  - Summer (DST): UTC+02:00 (CEST)
- Website: www.hattorf-am-harz.de

Hattorf am Harz is a Samtgemeinde ("collective municipality") in the district of Göttingen, in Lower Saxony, Germany. Its seat is in the village Hattorf am Harz.

The Samtgemeinde Hattorf am Harz consists of the following municipalities:

1. Elbingerode
2. Hattorf am Harz
3. Hörden am Harz
4. Wulften am Harz
