= Andervenne =

- Municipality
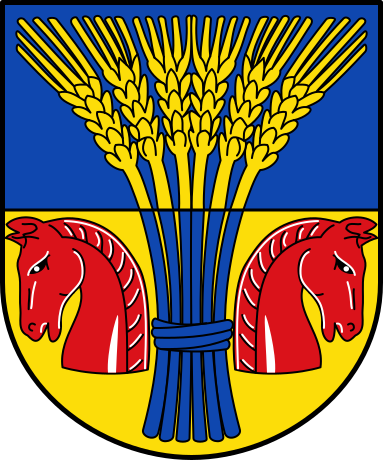
- Flag Coat of arms

- Location of Andervenne within Emsland district
- Interactive map of Andervenne
- Location within Germany Location within Lower Saxony
- Coordinates: 52°30′38″N 07°34′21″E
- Country: Germany
- State: Lower Saxony
- District: Emsland
- Municipal assoc.: Freren
- Subdivisions: 2

Government
  - Mayor: Reinhard Schröder (CDU)

Area
  - Total: 19.52 km^{2} (7.54 sq mi)
- Elevation: 36 m (118 ft)

Population (2025-12-31)
  - Total: 910
  - Density: 47/km^{2} (120/sq mi)
- Time zone: UTC+01:00 (CET)
  - Summer (DST): UTC+02:00 (CEST)
- Postal codes: 49832
- Dialling codes: 0 59 02
- Vehicle registration: EL

Andervenne is a municipality in the Emsland district, in Lower Saxony, Germany.
