= Freren =

- Town
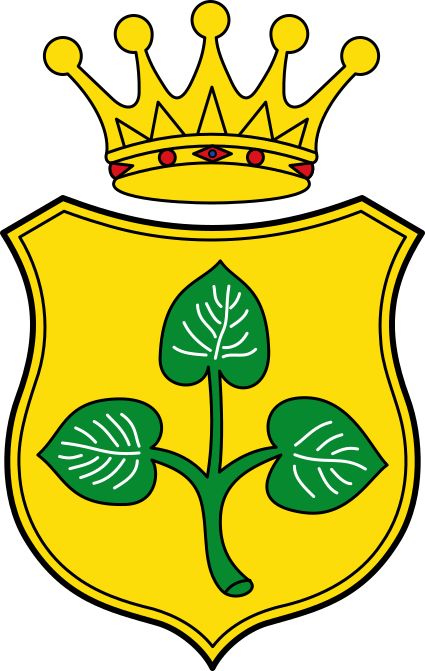
- Flag Coat of arms

- Location of Freren within Emsland district
- Interactive map of Freren
- Location within Germany Location within Lower Saxony
- Coordinates: 52°28′N 07°32′E
- Country: Germany
- State: Lower Saxony
- District: Emsland
- Municipal assoc.: Freren

Government
  - Mayor: Klaus Prekel (CDU)

Area
  - Total: 48.97 km^{2} (18.91 sq mi)
- Elevation: 33 m (108 ft)

Population (2025-12-31)
  - Total: 4,892
  - Density: 99.90/km^{2} (258.7/sq mi)
- Time zone: UTC+01:00 (CET)
  - Summer (DST): UTC+02:00 (CEST)
- Postal codes: 49832
- Dialling codes: 05902
- Vehicle registration: EL
- Website: www.freren.de

Freren (German pronunciation: [ˈfʁeːʁən]) is a municipality in the Emsland district, in Lower Saxony, Germany. It is situated approximately 15 km east of Lingen.

Freren is also the seat of the Samtgemeinde ("collective municipality") Freren.

== Notable people ==
- Erwin Jaenecke (1890–1960), general
- Maria Könning-de Siqueira Regueira (* 1954), diplomat
- Ernst Middendorp (* 1958), football coach
- Mathias Surmann (* 1974), football player
