= Wangerland =

- Municipality
- Flag Coat of arms

- Location of Wangerland within Friesland district
- Interactive map of Wangerland
- Location within Germany Location within Lower Saxony
- Coordinates: 53°39′N 7°57′E
- Country: Germany
- State: Lower Saxony
- District: Friesland
- Subdivisions: 14 quarters

Government
  - Mayor (2021–26): Mario Szlezak (SPD)

Area
  - Total: 176.19 km^{2} (68.03 sq mi)
- Elevation: 2 m (6.6 ft)

Population (2025-12-31)
  - Total: 9,137
  - Density: 51.86/km^{2} (134.3/sq mi)
- Time zone: UTC+01:00 (CET)
  - Summer (DST): UTC+02:00 (CEST)
- Postal codes: 26434, 26441 (Groß Hauskreuz)
- Dialling codes: 04463, 04464, 04461, 04425, 04426
- Vehicle registration: FRI
- Website: www.wangerland-online.de

Wangerland (German pronunciation: [ˈvaŋɐˌlant]) is a municipality in the district of Friesland, Lower Saxony, Germany. It is situated on the North Sea coast, approximately 20 km northwest of Wilhelmshaven, and 10 km north of Jever. Its seat is in the village Hohenkirchen.

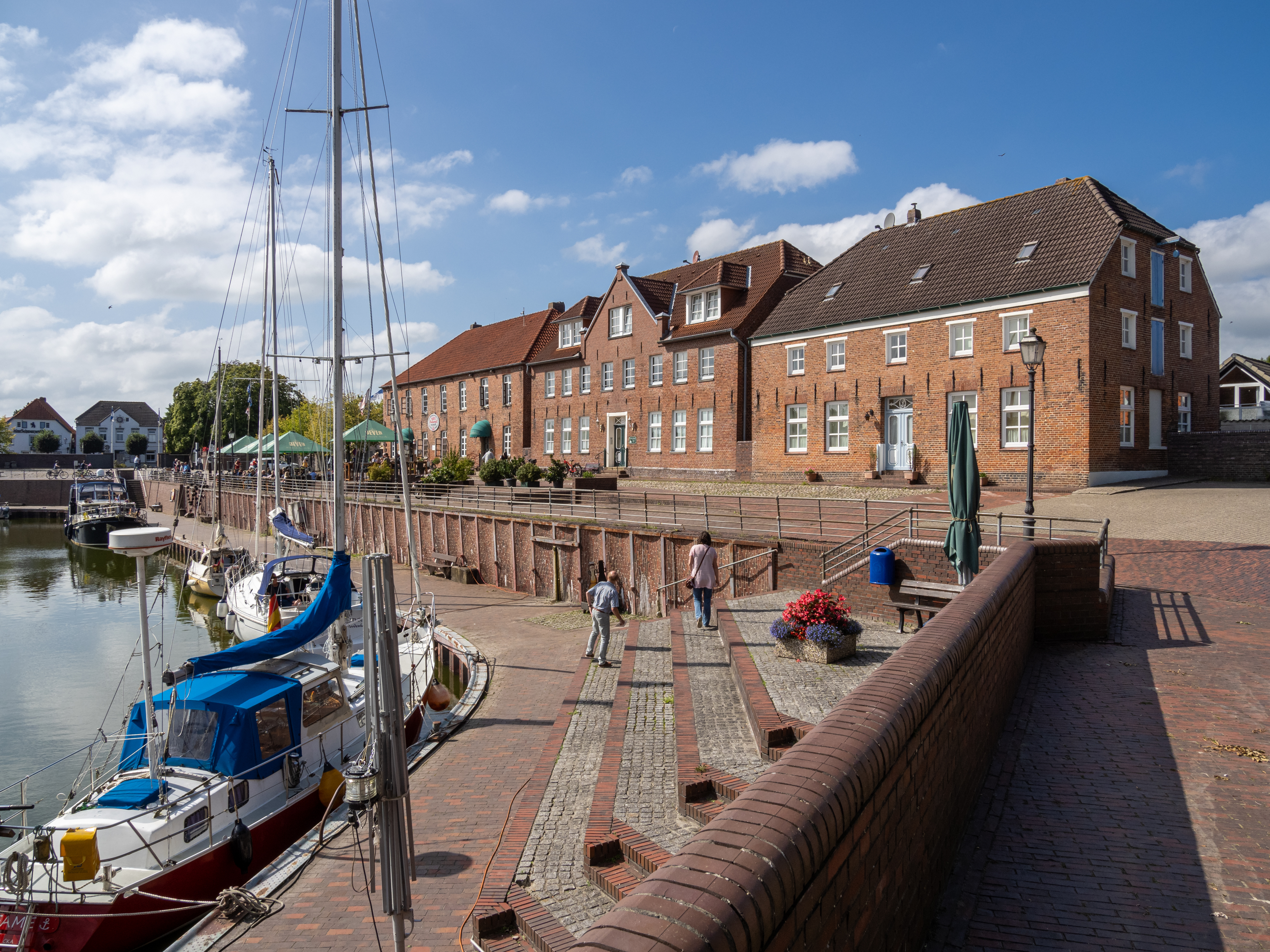
Old harbour with warehouses in Hooksiel

== History ==
First settlements are dated on the 2nd century B.C.

== Subdivision ==
The municipality consists of the following villages: Altgarmssiel, Förrien, Friederikensiel, Hohenkirchen, Hooksiel, Horumersiel, Middoge, Minsen, Neugarmssiel, Oldorf, Schillig, Tettens, Waddewarden and Wiarden.
