= Beesten =

- Municipality
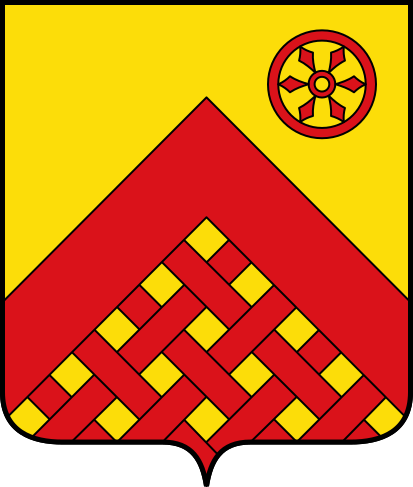
- Flag Coat of arms

- Location of Beesten within Emsland district
- Interactive map of Beesten
- Location within Germany Location within Lower Saxony
- Coordinates: 52°26′N 07°30′E
- Country: Germany
- State: Lower Saxony
- District: Emsland
- Municipal assoc.: Freren

Government
  - Mayor: Werner Achteresch (CDU)

Area
  - Total: 25.81 km^{2} (9.97 sq mi)
- Elevation: 32 m (105 ft)

Population (2025-12-31)
  - Total: 1,753
  - Density: 67.92/km^{2} (175.9/sq mi)
- Time zone: UTC+01:00 (CET)
  - Summer (DST): UTC+02:00 (CEST)
- Postal codes: 49832
- Dialling codes: 0 59 05
- Vehicle registration: EL

Beesten is a municipality in the Emsland district, in Lower Saxony, Germany.
