= Drestedt =

- Municipality
- Flag Coat of arms

- Location of Drestedt within Harburg district
- Interactive map of Drestedt
- Location within Germany Location within Lower Saxony
- Coordinates: 53°20′N 09°46′E
- Country: Germany
- State: Lower Saxony
- District: Harburg
- Municipal assoc.: Hollenstedt

Government
  - Mayor: Bernd Apel

Area
  - Total: 5.71 km^{2} (2.20 sq mi)
- Elevation: 58 m (190 ft)

Population (2025-12-31)
  - Total: 872
  - Density: 153/km^{2} (396/sq mi)
- Time zone: UTC+01:00 (CET)
  - Summer (DST): UTC+02:00 (CEST)
- Postal codes: 21279
- Dialling codes: 04186
- Vehicle registration: WL

Drestedt is a municipality in the district of Harburg, in Lower Saxony, Germany.
