= Hattorf am Harz =

- Municipality
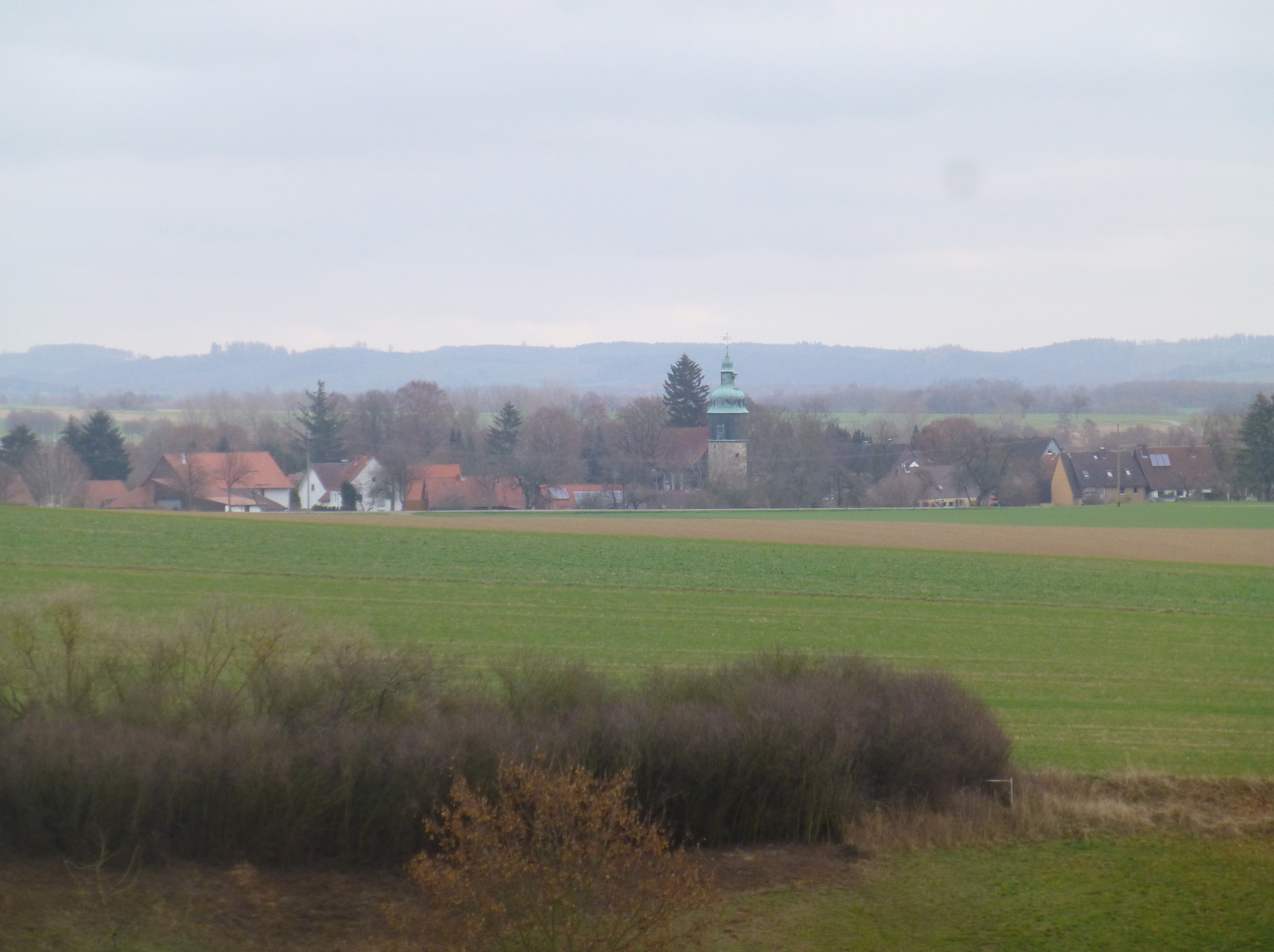

- Flag Coat of arms

- Location of Hattorf am Harz within Göttingen district
- Interactive map of Hattorf am Harz
- Location within Germany Location within Lower Saxony
- Coordinates: 51°39′05″N 10°14′13″E
- Country: Germany
- State: Lower Saxony
- District: Göttingen
- Municipal assoc.: Hattorf am Harz

Area
  - Total: 29.19 km^{2} (11.27 sq mi)
- Elevation: 176 m (577 ft)

Population (2025-12-31)
  - Total: 3,971
  - Density: 136.0/km^{2} (352.3/sq mi)
- Time zone: UTC+01:00 (CET)
  - Summer (DST): UTC+02:00 (CEST)
- Postal codes: 37197
- Dialling codes: 05584
- Vehicle registration: GÖ, OHA
- Website: www.hattorfamharz.de

Hattorf am Harz is a municipality in the district of Göttingen, in Lower Saxony, Germany. It is situated in the southern Harz, approx. 10 km south of Osterode am Harz.

Hattorf is also the seat of the Samtgemeinde ("collective municipality") Hattorf am Harz.

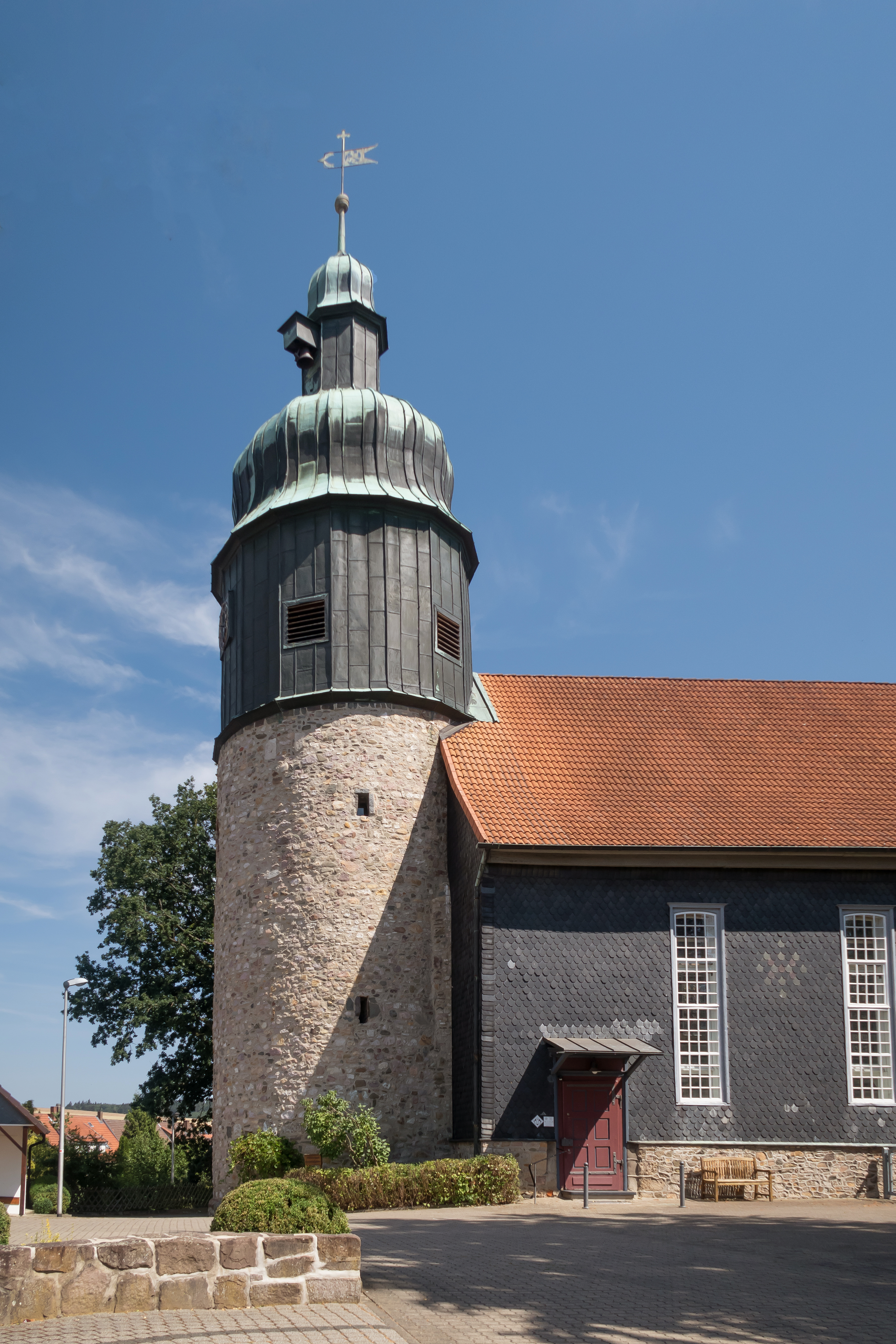
Reformed church: Kirche Sankt Pankratius

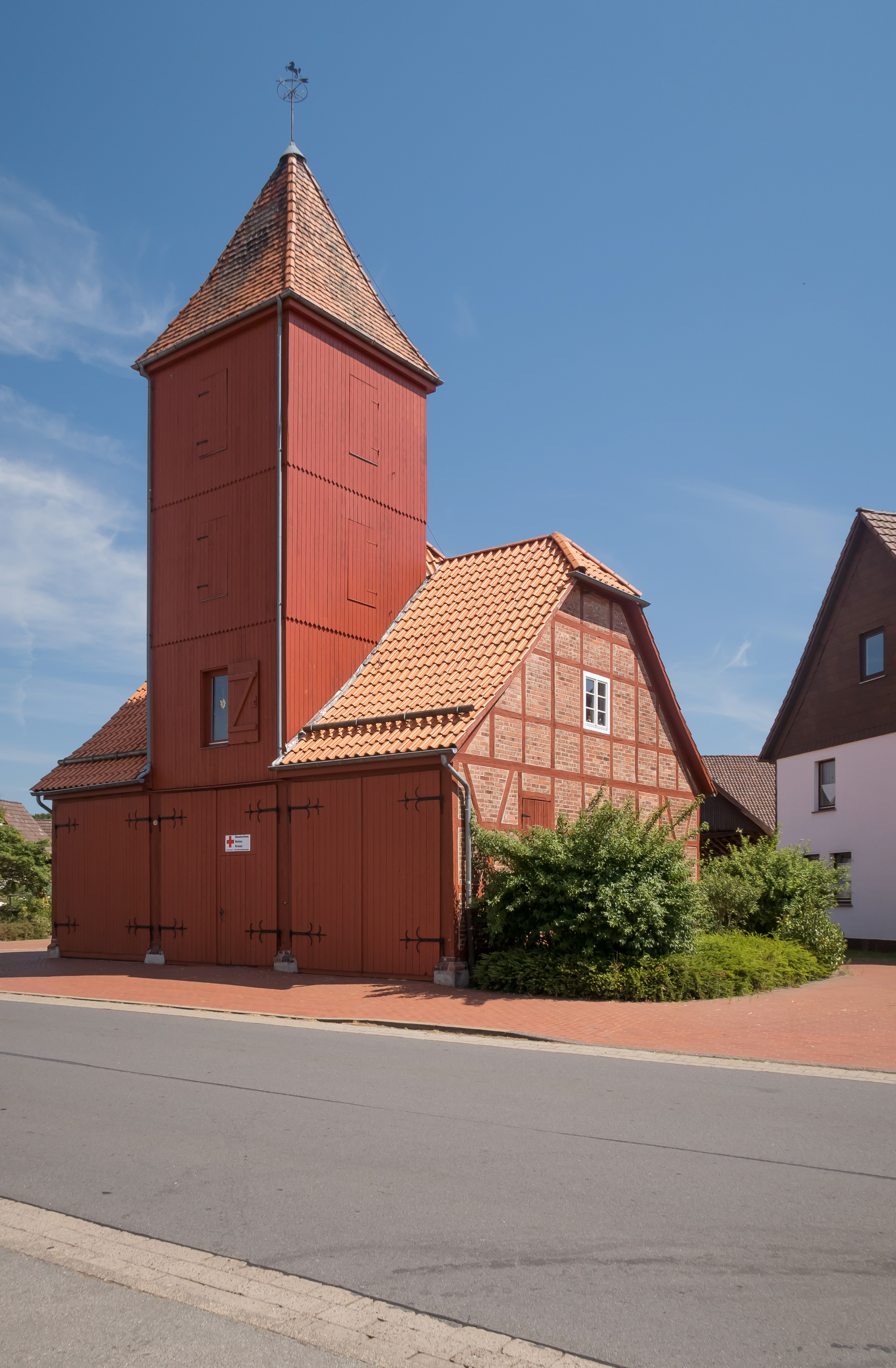
Warehouse for the Red Cross

== Twinning ==
Asten (Netherlands)

== Coat of arms ==
The coat of arms of Hattorf exists since 1952. The gear stands for the economic of the village, the ears of corn as symbols for the agriculture of Hattorf and the red kite for nature and environment.
