= Rotenberg (hills) =

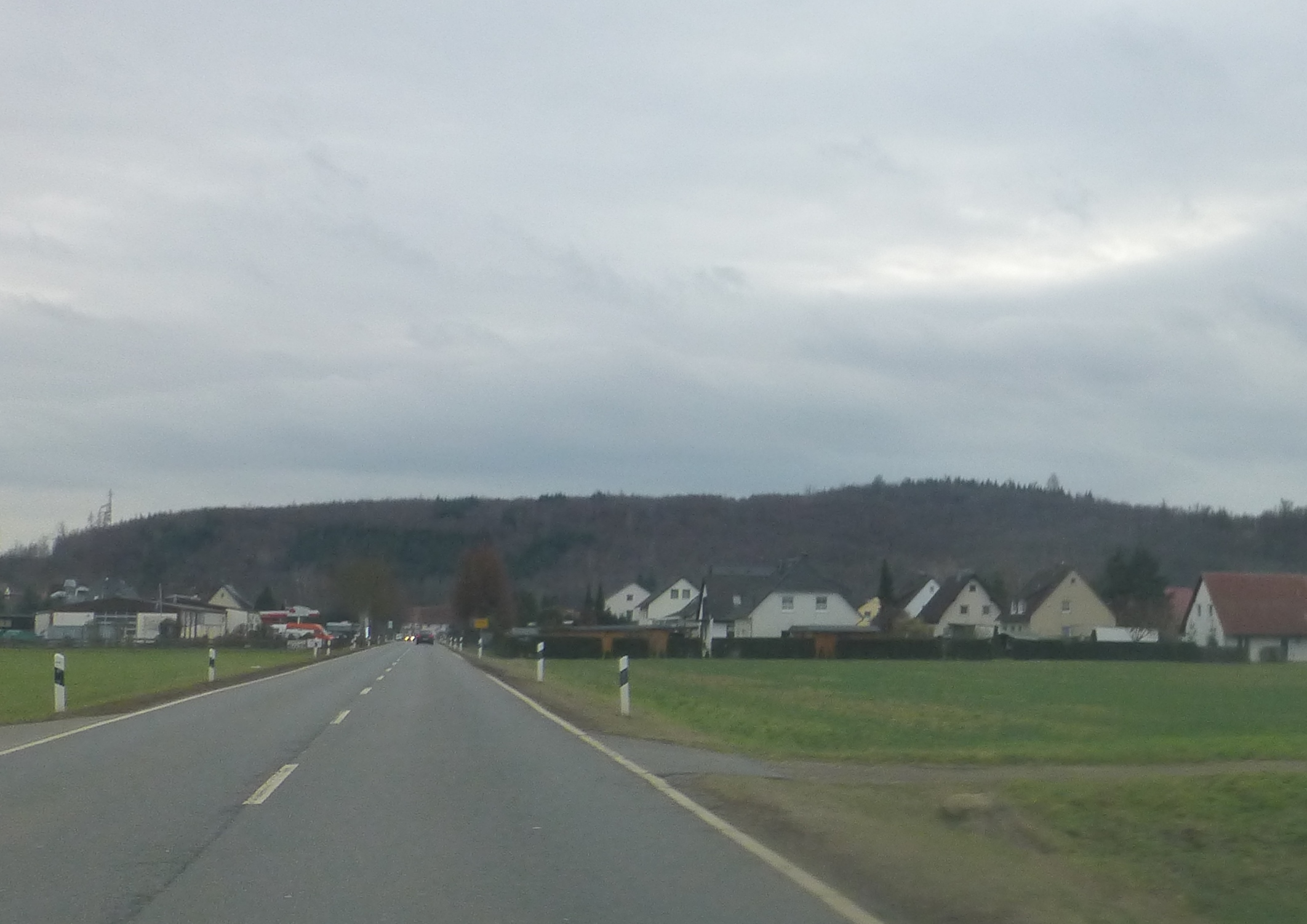

Highest point
- Elevation: 317 m (1,040 ft)
- Coordinates: 51°35′00″N 10°22′00″E

Geography
- Location within Lower Saxony
- Location: Lower Saxony, Germany

The Rotenberg is a hill range, up to 317.3 m high, in the Lower Saxon Hills in southeastern Lower Saxony, Germany.

== Geography ==
The Rotenberg ridge is oriented northwest–southeast and measures about 14 kilometres long by 2 kilometres wide. It lies in the district of Göttingen in the southeastern corner of the Lower Saxon Hills. It is located on the southwestern Harz Foreland roughly between Wulften to the northwest, Hattorf am Harz and Pöhlde to the north, Silkerode to the east, Rhumspringe and Gieboldehausen to the south and Bilshausen to the west. Somewhat further away are Osterode am Harz to the north, Herzberg am Harz to the northeast, Bad Lauterberg to the east, Duderstadt to the south, Göttingen to the southwest and Northeim to the northwest.

According to the official classification of natural regions of Germany the ridge belongs to the landscape unit of the Eichsfeld Basin in the Weser-Leine Uplands.

The Rotenberg is surrounded by the following other ranges: the Harz Mountains to the north and, somewhat further away, the Ohm Hills to the southeast and the Göttingen Forest to the southwest.

The Rotenberg hills lie on the watershed between the Oder and Beber rivers in the north and the Rhume and Eller rivers in the south. These rivers and the small streams that rise in the hills belong to the catchment area of the Leine, several kilometres to the west.

== Hills ==
The hills in and near the Rotenberg include the:

- Rotenberg (317,3 m) – southeast of Pöhlde, near the border with Thuringia
- Schiebehalbe (290 m) – southwest of Pöhlde
- Heimkenberg (274,1 m) – south of Hattorf
- Kethanteichskopf (260 m) – west of Pöhlde
- Rollershauser Kopf (245 m) – southwest of Hattorf
- Hohe Warte (241 m) – north of Wollershausen
- Finnenkopf (238 m) – southeast of Pöhlde
- Bornberg (237 m) – northeast of Rhumspringe
- Spitzenröder Berg (239 m) – east of Rhumspringe
- Bilshäuser Kopf (236 m) – east of Bilshausen
- Mittelberg (236 m) – east of Wollershausen
- Thiershäuser Berg (215 m) – north of Gieboldehausen
