= Georg Schreiber =

German politician (1882–1963)

George Schreiber
- Born: 8 January 1882; Rüdershausen, Province of Hanover, Prussia, German Empire
- Died: 24 February 1963; Münster (NRW), West Germany
- Education: Münster; Berlin
- Occupations: Politician church historian priest university professor and rector
- Political party: Catholic Centre party
- Parent(s): Franz Ignaz Schreiber (1835–87); Marie Freckmann (1860–1942)

Georg Schreiber (5 January 1882 – 24 February 1963) was a German politician (Catholic Centre party) and church historian. He spent fifteen years as a student which, even by the standards of Wilhelmine Germany, was exceptional. Following ordination he increasingly combined his student career with chaplaincy work. He nevertheless ended up with an unusually broad university-level education. He held a full "ordinary" professorship at the University of Münster between 1917 and 1935, and again between 1945 and 1951, also serving as University Rector during 1945/46. He served as a Member of Parliament, representing electoral district 19 – later 17 (Westphalia North) – between 1920 and 1933.

== Life and works ==
=== Provenance and early years ===
Georg Schreiber was born in Rüdershausen, a small yet ancient village set in the wooded countryside to the north of Duderstadt (Göttingen). Franz Ignaz Schreiber (1835–87), his father worked in forestry. His grandfather, Ignaz Fromm Schreiber (1760–1846), is described as a manufacturer. He attended a church school at Duderstadt between 1885 and 1895, then moving on to the "Gymnasium Josefinum" (catholic secondary school) in Heidesheim till 1901 and then enrolled at the University of Münster where he studied Theology. In or around 1901 he joined the catholic student fraternity "Unitas Frisia". The next year he was elected to chair the university student committee. On 7 April 1905 Georg Schreiber was ordained into the priesthood at Heidesheim. He now broadened the scope of his university education, studying History and Germanistics. In 1906 he switched to the Friedrich Wilhelm University (as the Humboldt was known at that time) in Berlin where he combined his studies with chaplaincy work at the "Elisabeth-Stift" philanthropic-recuperative institution run by the "Grey sisters". He received his first doctorate from Berlin University on 26 June 1909, (Note: Georg Schreiber's doctoral dissertation concerned church history and was entitled "Kurie und Kloster im 12. Jahrhundert" ("Curia and Monastery in the twelfth century"). When it was adapted for publication in 1910 it ran to two volumes.) and then in 1911 - still at Berlin - switched to the study of Jurisprudence. Throughout this period, between 1909 and 1913, Schreiber was also undertaking priestly duties at the Royal St. Joseph Hospital in Potsdam. On 29 November 1913 he received his Doctorate in Theology from the University of Freiburg. The qualification was provided in return for work on "the use of language in the Medieval Oblation System: a contribution to the History of the Church Taxation System and Church Law". Unusually, he submitted his dissertation and received his Theology doctorate at Freiburg University despite never having enrolled as a student there or studied there. Then of 1 April 1915 he received his Habilitation (higher degree) in Church History from the University of Münster, thereby opening the way for a lifelong career in the universities sector.

=== Professor ===
Between 1915 and 1917 he taught as a full-time associate professor at the Royal Lyceum (later relaunched as the Regensburg Philosophical-Theological Academy) in Regensburg, teaching church law, as well as (Bavarian) state and administrative law. During this period he developed an interest in religious folklore, a topic which he would later research more systematically. In 1917 he returned to Münster, accepting a full professorship in Church History and of Church Charity and Virtue ("Caritas"). He retained his professorship without a break till 1933, despite his election to the Reichstag (national parliament) in 1920, and his church promotion to the (probably largely honorary) rank of Papal Domestic Prelate in 1924. Nevertheless, described later by his biographer Rudolf Morsey as a "worker bee of parliament" and a "key figure in the politics of culture and the arts at a national level", Schreiber needed a reliable deputy for his university teaching duties, a role undertaken by the church historian Ludwig Mohler (1883–1943).

In 1927, with financial backing from the Foreign Ministry, Schreiber set up the university's research centre for "Auslandsdeutschtum und Auslandkunde" (German communities abroad). That was followed up in 1929 with the establishment of an "Emigration Advice Centre", also at Münster. In March 1933 he founded a "Deutsche Institut für Volkskunde e.V" (German Folklore Institute), closely linked to the "Auslandsdeutschtum und Auslandkunde" research centre.

=== Under National Socialism ===
Meanwhile, in January 1933 the Hitler government had taken power. The National Socialists lost no time in transforming Germany into a post-democratic one- party dictatorship. For those involved in politics, the security services proved particularly assiduous in their persecution of known former Communists and Socialists, many of whom escaped abroad or were imprisoned by the government, and in some cases subsequently killed. Those from the political centre, such as Georg Schreiber, were not in such immediate peril, but as a Member of Parliament (till its dissolution during 1933) who had never shown any interest in backing Hitler, Schreiber quickly became a focus of government suspicion. During 1933 the university came under pressure to dismiss him. They held out for nearly two years, but on 2 March 1935 the government had Schreiber forcibly appointed to a full professorship in Medieval and Modern Church History at the Collegium Hosianum in Braunsberg, not far from Königsberg, but a very long way from Berlin (and a very long way down in the rankings of university-level educational institutions after Münster). The government plan was for a simple job swap with Joseph Lortz who had held the Braunsberg job since 1929. With the help of friends who still retained some influence in academic circles, notably Karl Haushofer and Ferdinand Sauerbruch, Schreiber was able to defer his transfer by taking an extended leave of absence from Münster. Then, in 1936, he was able to take early retirement "due to illness". Lortz had by that time already taken over his professorship at Münster the previous year, though he did resign his party membership a couple of years later.

Schreiber remained under intense government surveillance. In 1939 the Institutes for "Auslandsdeutschtum und Auslandkunde" (German communities abroad) and "German folklore" were "confiscated", their roles reconfigured and taken over by replacement organisations controlled more directly by the party.

After 1942 the prospect of the promised easy military victory receded. Despite government efforts to control the information flow, rumours of industrial scale killings of Jews and government opponents in death camps began to emerge among those able and willing to ask the right questions in the right places and listen to the answers. By 1944, with military defeat looming on the horizon, the mood was increasingly one of despair: the government was becoming unpopular. A high-profile assassination attempt in July 1944 left the leader seriously injured and sent the government into a protracted spasm of enhanced paranoia. Thousands were arrested overnight on 22/23 August. It is clear from the list of addresses visited at that time by police, Nazi paramilitaries and Gestapo officers that the government's list of people to be rounded up was heavily dependent on (by now increasingly outdated) lists of politicians who had served the country before 1933.

In 1940 the prosecutor's office in Münster had launched a criminal investigation against Schreiber in respect of supposed violation of technical and administrative regulations at the institutes confiscated from him the previous year. Embezzlement was alleged. Many details of the case remain unclear, as are the circumstances under which it was dropped, probably for lack of evidence, on 9 May 1942. The party did not give up, however, and Schreiber was now placed under house arrest, while the security services continued to try and find reasons to reopen the case against him. Schreiber avoided capture in the aftermath of the assassination attempt, already aware that he was likely to be at heightened risk of detention, and having evidently received timely warnings from insiders. There are references to security service reports describing him as "passionately opposed to Nazism" (though it is not clear precisely what he might have done to attract such comments). In any event, during the second half of the summer in 1944 he fled south, taking refuge initially in Osterhofen and nearby Arbing. It seems reasonable to suppose that his choice of location was connected with the still dominant role of the church in the district. In January 1945 he found a more permanent place of refuge, hiding for the rest of the war with the Benedictines in the monastery at Ottobeuren.

=== Münster after the war ===
Early in 1947 Georg Schreiber reached the then conventional retirement age of 65. In a letter addressed to the university trustees on 24 February 1947, the Dean of the Catholic-Theological faculty at the university asked that the minister for Education and Culture should be approached with a request that Schreiber's term of service might me extended. He gave three reasons in support:

Mit Schreiben vom 24. Februar 1947 an den Kurator bittet der Dekan der Katholisch-Theologischen Fakultät der Universität Münster diesen, sich beim Kultusminister dafür einzusetzen, die Dienstzeit von Georg Schreiber zu verlängern. In seinem Schreiben führt er folgende Begründungen an:

1. Mr. Schreiber is still in full possession of his physical and mental powers. He still has a formidable capacity for work.
2. He is able to access a highly unusual breadth of knowledge in the fields of Medieval and Modern Church History, Medieval Legal History, Religious Folklore and 'Caritas'.
3. Mr Schreiber still has plans for a number of academic projects which will be best implemented if he himself is able to undertake them in parallel with his teaching duties.

1. Herr Schreiber ist noch in vollem Besitz seiner körperlichen und geistigen Kräfte und noch von einer gewaltigen Arbeitsfähigkeit.
2. Er verfügt über ein seltenes, umfassendes Wissen, namentlich auf dem Gebiet der mittelalterlichen und neueren Kirchengeschichte, der mittelalterlichen Rechtsgeschichte, der religiösen Volkskunde und der Karitaswissenschaft.
3. Herr Schreiber hat noch eine Reihe von wissenschaftlichen Arbeiten geplant, die er am besten im Zusammenhang mit seinem Lehramt durchführen kann.

In July 1945 Schreiber was able to return to Münster. The southern part of Germany in which he had been hiding for more than six months had been part of the US occupation zone since May 1945, and his return was mediated through the intervention of the US News agency across the Swiss frontier in Bern. His home in Münster had been badly damaged by Anglo-American aerial bombing, and he lived for the time being in a seminary in the Cathedral Square. It was only when he got back to Münster that he discovered that he had been elected University Rector earlier in the month, at a meeting of a hastily convened "emergency" University Senate, held on 16 July 1945. The senate had met under the chairmanship of the serving rector, the Pathology professor Herbert Siegmund who had been permitted by the British military authorities to retain his office in the immediate aftermath of the war despite his close National Socialist connections during the Hitler years. The other members of the emergency senate were university professors who had all been determined to be "unencumbered" (in the phrase used at the time) by Nazi links. Following election by the university professors, Schreiber's appointment as rector was confirmed by Rudolf Amelunxen who had been installed as First President of the newly reconstituted Province of Westphalia, though Amelunxen written confirmation came through only on 26 October 1945, following formal agreement from the British military administrators. Meanwhile, the university authorities had already, in August 1945, restored his professorship.

His term as rector lasted a year. Sources report the unstinting commitment with which he launched the massive reconstruction process necessary. More broadly he dedicated his energies to restoring the relationship of mutual respect and collaboration between the church, society and the world of politics which had existed before 1933. He believed the integration of the proper spiritual dimension was fundamental to the operation of a modern society, and was able to call on his deep knowledge of the Medieval church and legal history in promoting his own visions for foreign and cultural policy. Georg Schreiber eventually retired on 1 April 1951, a couple of months after celebrating his seventieth birthday. In the formal letter releasing him from his professorial duties, the minister paid warm tribute in respect of his work and achievements. There are indications that he remained closely involved with the University of Münster for the rest of his life.

He also joined the boards of a number of academic institutions, working to rebuild German academic tradition in the western part of the now divided country. Between 1951 and his death in 1963 he was an academic member of the Heidelberg-based Max Planck Institute for Comparative Public Law and International Law. Between 15 February 1946 and 23 June 1962 he chaired the Westphalia Historical Commission, following which, during the final months of his life, he retained his link in his capacity as honorary chairman.

== Politics ==
Towards the end of 1918, with old certainties dissolving in the dismal aftermath of a catastrophic war, George Schreiber launched himself as a politician of the Centre Party, which was seen by many as the political manifestation of Catholic Germany. He embarked on his political career by authoring a succession of newspaper articles, sometimes using the pseudonym "Richard Richardy", and by delivering speeches at party meetings. A broadly sympathetic commentator implies unambiguously that Schreiber's "big ... speeches" could be a little too carefully prepared: when he improvised, the impact of his oratory was sometimes greater. Reflecting the satisfyingly simplistic beliefs of the time that the war had been "caused" by an excess of Prussian militarism, he adopted with relish the party slogan, "Los von Berlin – Los von Preußen". His speeches may not have been to the taste of everyone, but his position as a youthful energetic professor of church history evidently appealed to Catholic voters. On 19 November 1918 he published an article in the widely read (in the region) Kölnische Volkszeitung (newspaper) calling for a "strong political coming together" of the formerly Prussian provinces of Westphalia and Rhineland into a new German federal state. This campaign was ended in 1919 when the Weimar National Assembly (pre-parliament) produced a new constitution that provided for the establishment of new federal states through the roguish device of a referendum, but it had significantly helped raise Schreiber's public profile in the regions concerned. The first national election of the new Republican Germany was held early in June 1920. Schreiber stood as a candidate for the "Westphalia North" electoral district (which included his home region of Münster) and was directly elected (without recourse to the "second preference votes" of losing candidates).

During his twelve years in the Reichstag a not unsympathetic journalist described Georg Schreiber's political style:

"He's never still, always in receiving mode, a master listener. He's so skilful at it that he quickly knows a lot about a lot, and retains an impartial assessment of the essentials. He's a better speaker than he thinks he is. His great 'state of the nation' speeches are, perhaps, too well prepared, over-thought through and syntactically embellished – when he improvises he comes across more strongly. He loves to play with irony. But he also demonstrates a measured temperament, and brings to private discussion an amiable sarcasm. Then he assumes an innocent expression on his face even as he serves up a shot of telling malice. But always perfectly graciously."

»Er ist immer in Bewegung, immer aufnehmend, ein Meister der Rezeption. Das macht er so geschickt, daß er sich in vielem rasch auskennt und den unbefangenen Sinn für das Wesentliche behält. Er kann rednerisch mehr, als er sich zutraut. Seine großen Etatreden sind vielleicht etwas zu gut vorbereitet, überlegt und geschmückt – wenn er improvisiert, kann er stärker wirken. Er liebt den ironischen Vortrag. Aber er hat auch eine gute Portion Temperament und für den Privatgebrauch liebenswürdigen Sarkasmus. Dann macht er ein unschuldsvolles Gesicht und serviert verbindliche Bosheiten. Das macht er recht graziös.«

As a Centre party Member of Parliament between 1920 and 1933, Georg Schreiber's focus was on cultural issues, broadly defined. He sought to improve collaboration between religious and worldly elements. Naturally he also represented church interests. He was an influential member of the parliamentary budget committee. At the same time he tried to reduce what he saw as an unnecessary distancing between Centre Party and the universities establishment, to stand up for the interests of "intellectual and spiritual workers", and to reconcile the traditionalist church community with the new republican order.

He was keen to sustain the empire tradition, despite recent attacks by foreign armies and internal fissures, but still a "great power spiritually, culturally and scientifically". Along with his own journalistic contributions Schreiber, as self-appointed "emergency rescuer of German scholarship," was able to trigger a more extensive surge in public editorialising, and to promote a culturally oriented foreign policy in support of German minorities abroad. Five universities and university departments in Germany and a further three in Austria awarded him honorary doctorates in gratitude, most notably, in 1928, the law faculty at Heidelberg.

As a Reichsprälat (loosely, "state prelate"), he also participated in the struggle to strengthen the position of the church and "repatriate exiled Catholicism" (... um das "Rückkehr des deutschen Katholizismus aus dem Exil"). (Note: Border changes mandated by the victorious allies at Versailles had reallocated predominantly Roman Catholic parts of Germany to France and Pol and, leaving Catholics outnumbered by Protestants in a ratio of approximately 2:1 in what remained of Germany.) Schreiber was centrally engaged, virtually throughout the 1920s, in the extensive preparatory work for the so-called Prussian Concordat signed in 1929 and designed to place the relationship between the German republic and the Holy See on a regular legal footing. That was something that had been lacking since the abrupt termination of the Prussian monarchy back in 1918. Most of the provisions of the concordat – which was given effect by means of papal bull in 1930, remain in force as part of the instrument regulating relations between the church and modern Germany today.

In the summer of 1933, facing intolerable pressure from various levels of the National Socialist government, the Centre Party dissolved itself. When Georg Schreiber thereby lost his parliamentary mandate, he lost a number of other representative role and responsibilities at the same time. But as a respected former member of the former Centre Party he remained in the sites of the security services, and his name soon appeared on a list of persons against whom further "appropriate measures" should be taken.

After the war he sought to return to politics, in 1947 standing for election to the state parliament in the newly reconfigured state of North Rhine-Westphalia. It was widely believed that it was only on account of political division on the left and centre that in 1933 post-democratic populist street politicians had been able to take power in Germany. In the Soviet occupation zone that conviction led, in April 1946, to the contentious creation of the Socialist Unity Party (SED). However, the SED gained no traction in the western zones, where it was widely seen as a device for the furtherance of Soviet imperialist ambitions. A number of parties formerly of the centre and centre-right had nevertheless come together in the western zones, leading to the formation in 1945 of the Christian Democratic Union (CDU party). One of these was the old Catholic Centre party. It was accordingly as a CDU candidate that Georg Schreiber stood for election in 1947. He failed to gain a seat, and thereafter concentrated on his work at the university, also taking a number of significant positions at the interface between the universities sector and politics.

== Authorships ==
Goerg Schreiber was one of the most eminent culture and church historians of his generation. His 1951 2-volumes on the Council of Trent quickly became a "standard work" and, some would contend, has yet to be supplanted. He also produced several important works on German administrative history and on socio-cultural themes. His work on the history of wine making in Germany and central Europe was a case in point. In respect of church history, his writings on the history of the church tax system, the history of miracles and of popular piety, all deserve particular mention. All his work is characterised by a careful combining of different approaches, in ways which at the time were far from usual, notably in terms of the way he incorporates folkloric material, giving rise to a pioneering interdisciplinary view of historical research.

== Published output (selection) ==
- Mutter und Kind in der Kultur der Kirche. Studien zur Quellenkunde und Geschichte der Caritas, Sozialhygiene und Bevölkerungspolitik. Herder, Freiburg im Breisgau 1918.
- Deutsche Kulturpolitik und der Katholizismus. Herder, Freiburg im Breisgau 1922.
- Deutsches Beamtentum und deutsche Kulturpolitik. In: Werner Friedrich Bruck, Heinrich Weber (Caritaswissenschaftler)|Heinrich Weber (Hrsg.): Beamtenschaft und Verwaltungsakademie: Festschrift zur Tagung des Reichsverbandes Deutscher Verwaltungsakademien am 1. und 2. Juni 1928 in Münster i. W. und Bochum. Westfälische Vereinsdruckerei, Münster 1928, pp. 81–90.
- Das Auslandsdeutschtum als Kulturfrage. Aschendorff, Münster 1929.
- Nationale und internationale Volkskunde. Schwann, Düsseldorf 1930.
- Volkstum und Kulturpolitik: Eine Sammlung von Aufsätzen. Gewidmet Georg Schreiber zum fünfzigsten Geburtstage. Hrsg. von Heinrich Konen und Johann Peter Steffes. Gilde, Köln 1932.
- Deutsche Bauernfrömmigkeit in volkskundlicher Sicht. Schwann, Düsseldorf 1937.
- Die Sakrallandschaft des Abendlandes mit besonderer Berücksichtigung von Pyrenäen, Rhein und Donau. Schwann, Düsseldorf 1937. Digitalisat
- Deutsche Mirakelbücher: Zur Quellenkunde und Sinngebung. Schwann, Düsseldorf 1938.
- Zwischen Demokratie und Diktatur. Persönliche Erinnerungen an die Politik und Kultur des Reiches 1919–1944. Regensbergsche Verlagsbuchhandlung, Münster 1949.
- Iroschottische und angelsächsische Wanderkulte in Westfalen. In: Heinrich Börsting, Alois Schröer (as compilers): Westfalia sacra. Quellen und Forschungen zur Kirchengeschichte Westfalens. vol. 2. Aschendorff, Münster 1950, pp. 1–132.
- Das Weltkonzil von Trient. Sein Werden und Wirken. 2 vols. Herder, Freiburg im Breisgau 1951.
- Deutsche Wissenschaftspolitik von Bismarck bis zum Atomwissenschaftler Otto Hahn. Westdeutscher Verlag, Köln 1954.
- Westdeutsche Charaktere. Daten und Erinnerungen an die Wissenschaftsgeschichte und Sozialpolitik der letzten Jahrzehnte. In: Westfälische Forschungen. vol. 9, 1956, pp. 54–82.
- Deutsche Weingeschichte. Der Wein in Volksleben, Kult und Wirtschaft. Rheinland-Verlag, Köln 1980, ISBN 3-7927-0331-9.
- Bernd Haunfelder: Die Rektoren, Kuratoren und Kanzler der Universität Münster 1826–2016. Ein biographisches Handbuch. (= Veröffentlichungen des Universitätsarchivs Münster. 14). Aschendorff, Münster 2020, ISBN 978-3-402-15897-5, pp. 224–228.
- Rudolf Morsey: Schriftenverzeichnis Georg Schreiber (Catalogue of the writings of Georg Schreiber). Alber, München/ Freiburg 1953.

== Awards and honours (selection) ==
- 1924 Honorary doctorate University of Aachen.
- 1926 Honorary doctorate University of Münster.
- 1926 Honorary doctorate LMU Munich.
- 1926–1933 Senator of the Kaiser Wilhelm Society.
- 1928 Honorary doctorate Heidelberg University.
- 1932 Goethe Medal for Arts, Sciences and Humanities.
- 1946–1960 Senator (later honorary senator) of the Max Planck Society.
- 1950 Member of the Working Circle for Research of the state of North Rhine-Westphalia.
- 1952 Honorary doctorate University of Salzburg.
- 1952 Corresponding Membership of the Royal Academy of Fine Literature of Barcelona.
- 1954 Commander's Cross.
- 1957 Grand Decoration of Honour in Gold for Services to the Republic of Austria.
- 1958 Protonotary apostolic.
- 1960 Honorary doctorate KU Leuven.
- 1961 Honorary doctorate University of Innsbruck.
- 1962 Harnack Medal of the Max Planck Society, awarded for exceptional services to society.
- 1962 Knight Commander's Cross: Great Cross with Star.
- 1963 Baron von Stein Medal (Westfalen-Lippe).
