= Masters M65 10000 metres world record progression =

This is the progression of world record improvements of the 10000 metres M65 division of Masters athletics.

Key

Incomplete information Pending

Hand	Auto	Athlete	Nationality	Birthdate	Location	Date
34:42.2		Derek Turnbull	New Zealand	05.12.1926	Christchurch	15.03.1992
36:04.6		Tedde Jensen	Sweden			
36:11.0		John Gilmour	Australia	03.05.1919	Melbourne	01.10.1984
37:04.0		Erich Kruzycki	Germany	18.02.1911	Bilshausen	10.04.1976
