= Bodensee, Lower Saxony =

Place in Lower Saxony, Germany

Bodensee
- Municipality
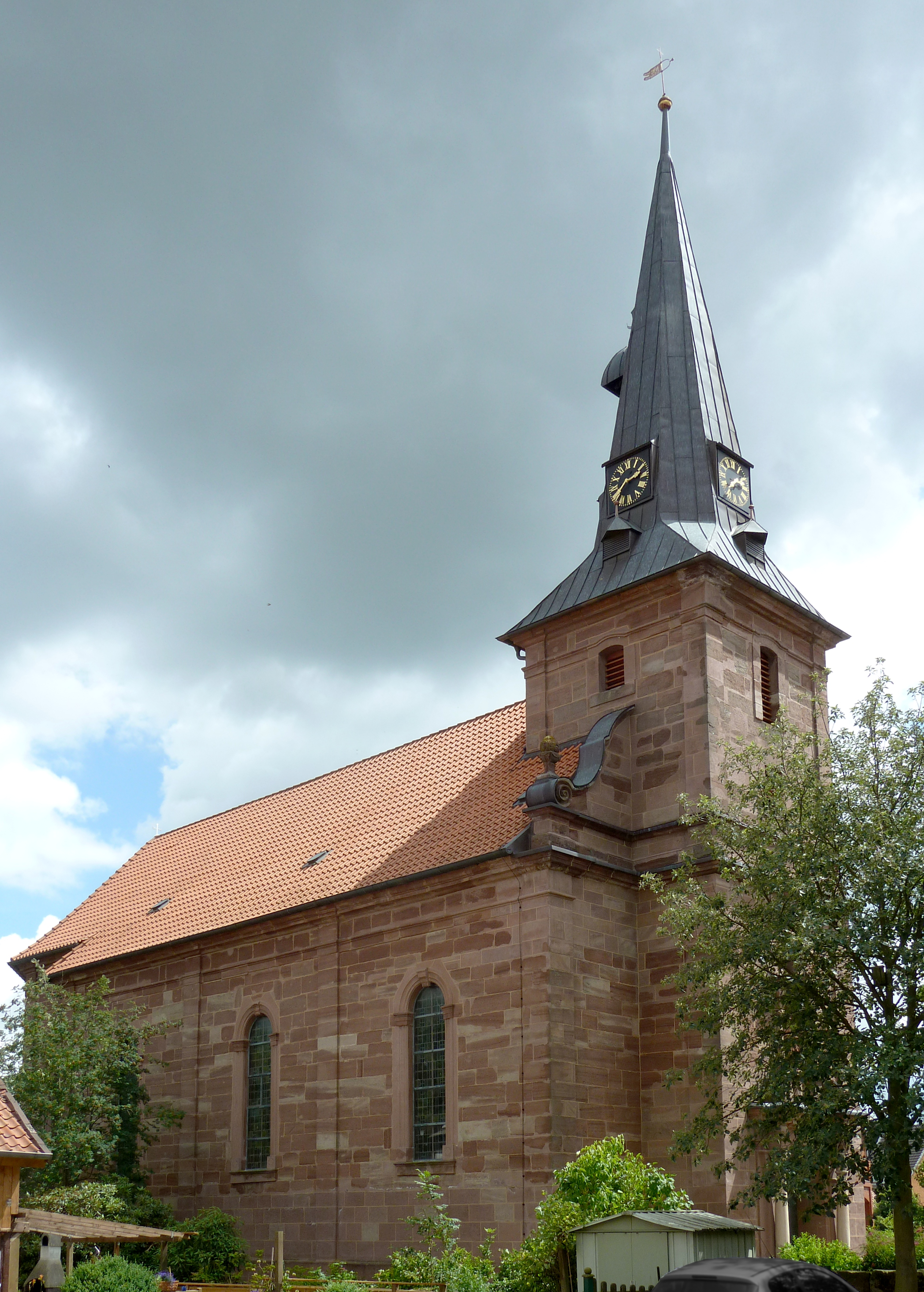
- Church of Saint Matthew

- Flag Coat of arms

- Location of Bodensee within Göttingen district
- Interactive map of Bodensee
- Location within Germany Location within Lower Saxony
- Coordinates: 51°36′N 10°8′E
- Country: Germany
- State: Lower Saxony
- District: Göttingen
- Municipal assoc.: Gieboldehausen

Government
  - Mayor: Friedrich Henniges (CDU)

Area
  - Total: 7.47 km^{2} (2.88 sq mi)
- Elevation: 168 m (551 ft)

Population (2025-12-31)
  - Total: 757
  - Density: 101/km^{2} (262/sq mi)
- Time zone: UTC+01:00 (CET)
  - Summer (DST): UTC+02:00 (CEST)
- Postal codes: 37434
- Dialling codes: 05507
- Vehicle registration: GÖ
- Website: www.samtgemeinde-gieboldehausen.de

Bodensee (German pronunciation: [ˈboːdn̩zeː]) is a municipality in the district of Göttingen, in Lower Saxony, Germany. It is part of the Eichsfeld.
