= Rhume Spring =

German spring

Coordinates: 51.589656°N 10.310175°E

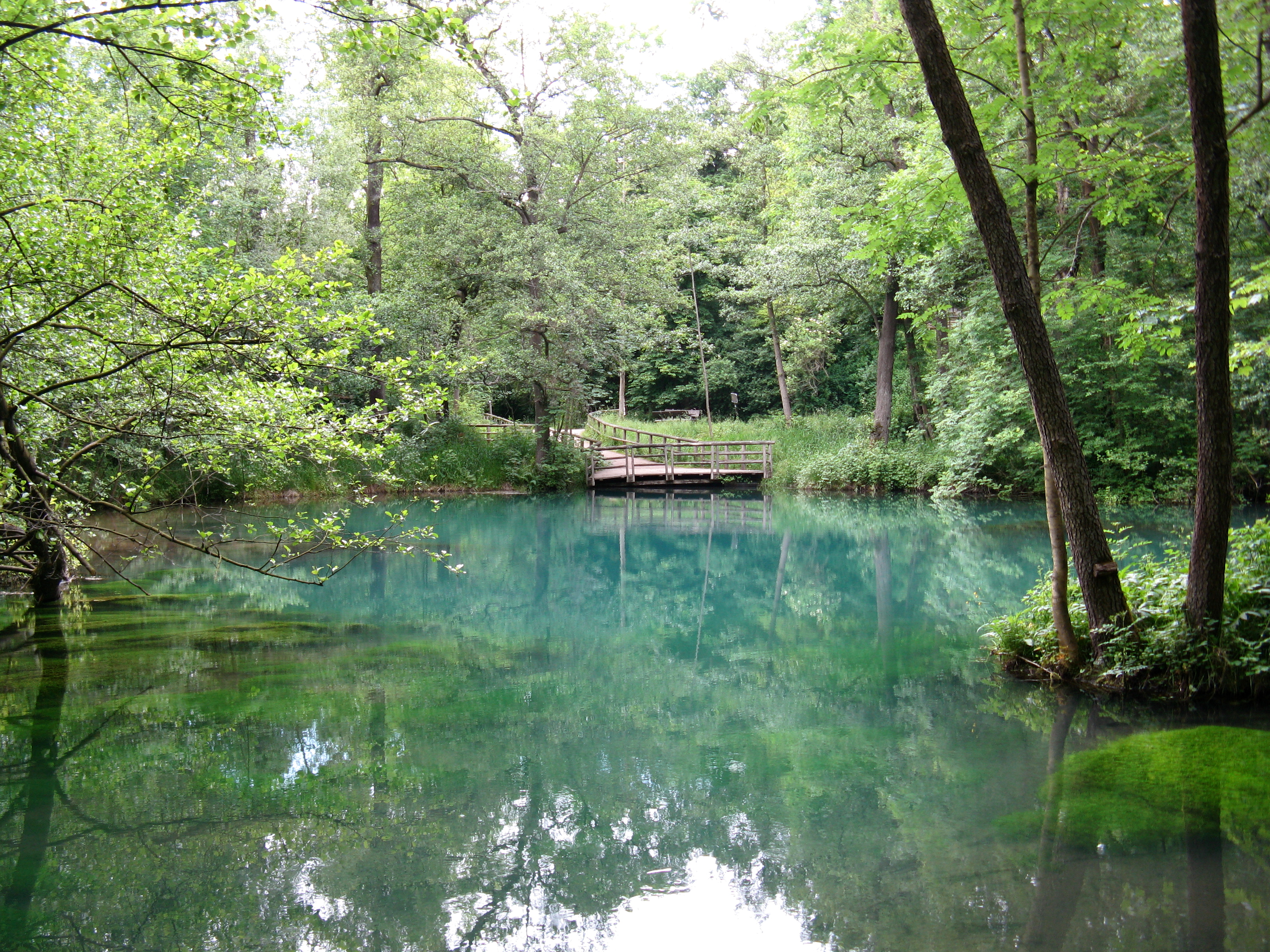
Main source of the Rhume Spring with blue-green colouration

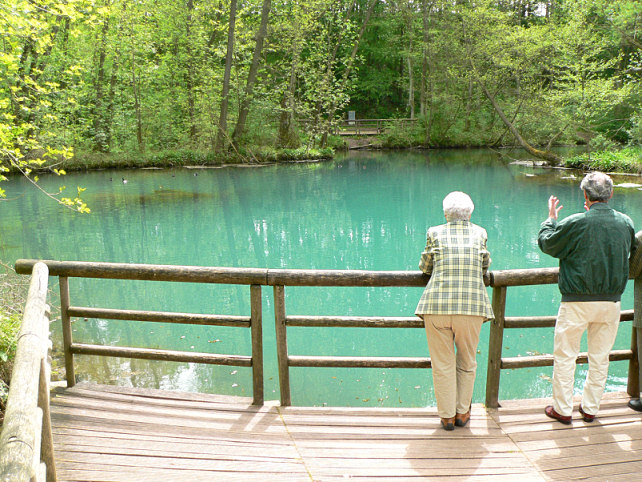
Observation platform at the source

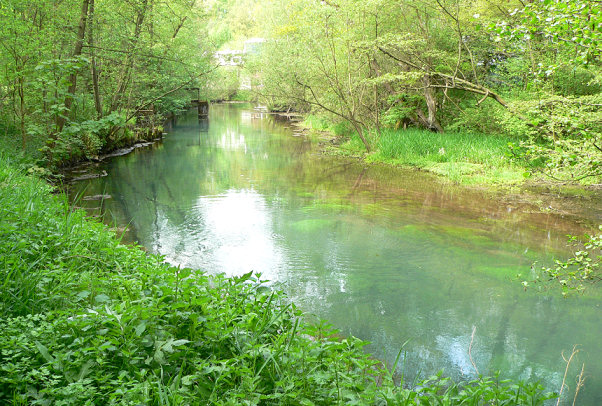
The Rhume a few metres behind its spring

The Rhume Spring (German: Rhumequelle, pronounced [ˈʁuːməˌkvɛlə]) is a large karst spring in the eastern part of the Rotenberg ridge not far from the northeastern edge of the village of Rhumspringe in the Harz mountains of Germany. It is the source of the River Rhume.

== Description ==
The spring is easily accessible by a nearby road.
