= Wollbrandshausen =

- Municipality
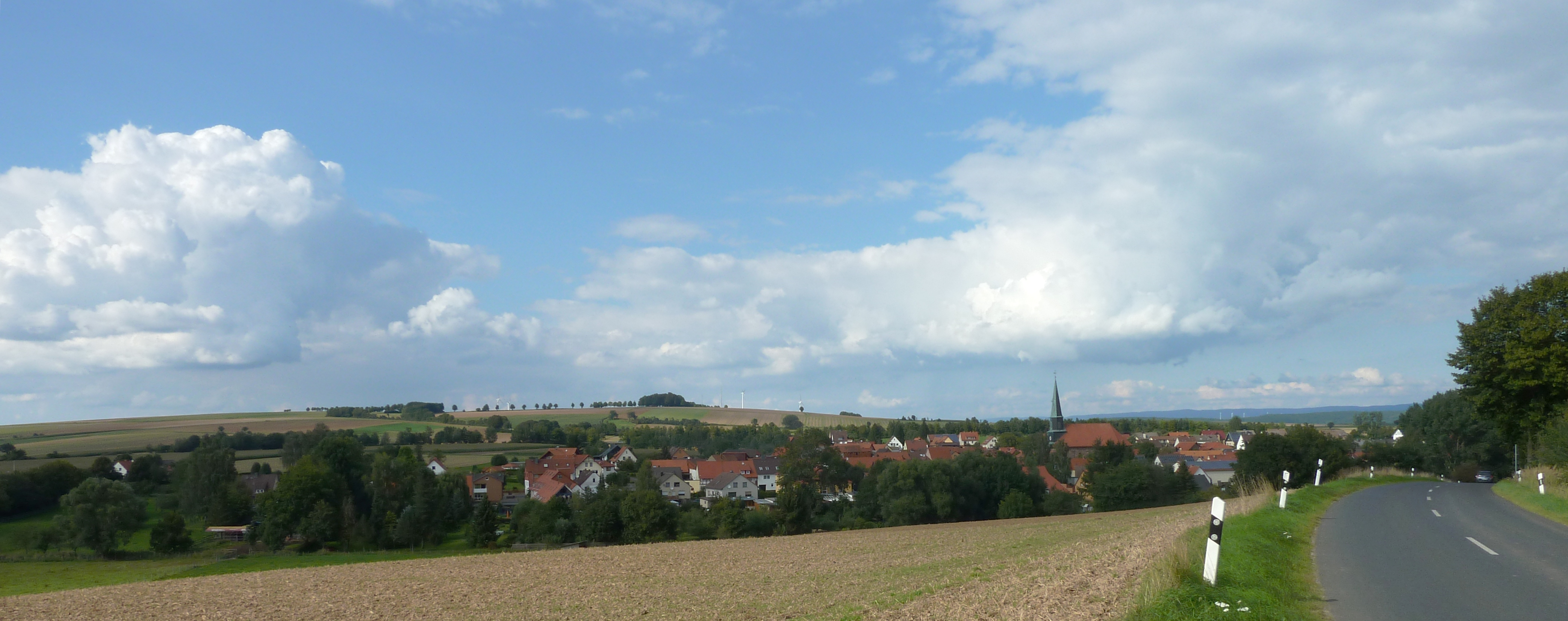

- Coat of arms

- Location of Wollbrandshausen within Göttingen district
- Interactive map of Wollbrandshausen
- Location within Germany Location within Lower Saxony
- Coordinates: 51°35′N 10°10′E
- Country: Germany
- State: Lower Saxony
- District: Göttingen
- Municipal assoc.: Gieboldehausen

Government
  - Mayor: Georg Freiberg (CDU)

Area
  - Total: 6.26 km^{2} (2.42 sq mi)
- Elevation: 174 m (571 ft)

Population (2025-12-31)
  - Total: 629
  - Density: 100/km^{2} (260/sq mi)
- Time zone: UTC+01:00 (CET)
  - Summer (DST): UTC+02:00 (CEST)
- Postal codes: 37434
- Dialling codes: 05528
- Vehicle registration: GÖ
- Website: www.wollbrandshausen-homepage.de

Wollbrandshausen is a municipality in the district of Göttingen, in Lower Saxony, Germany. It is part of the Eichsfeld.

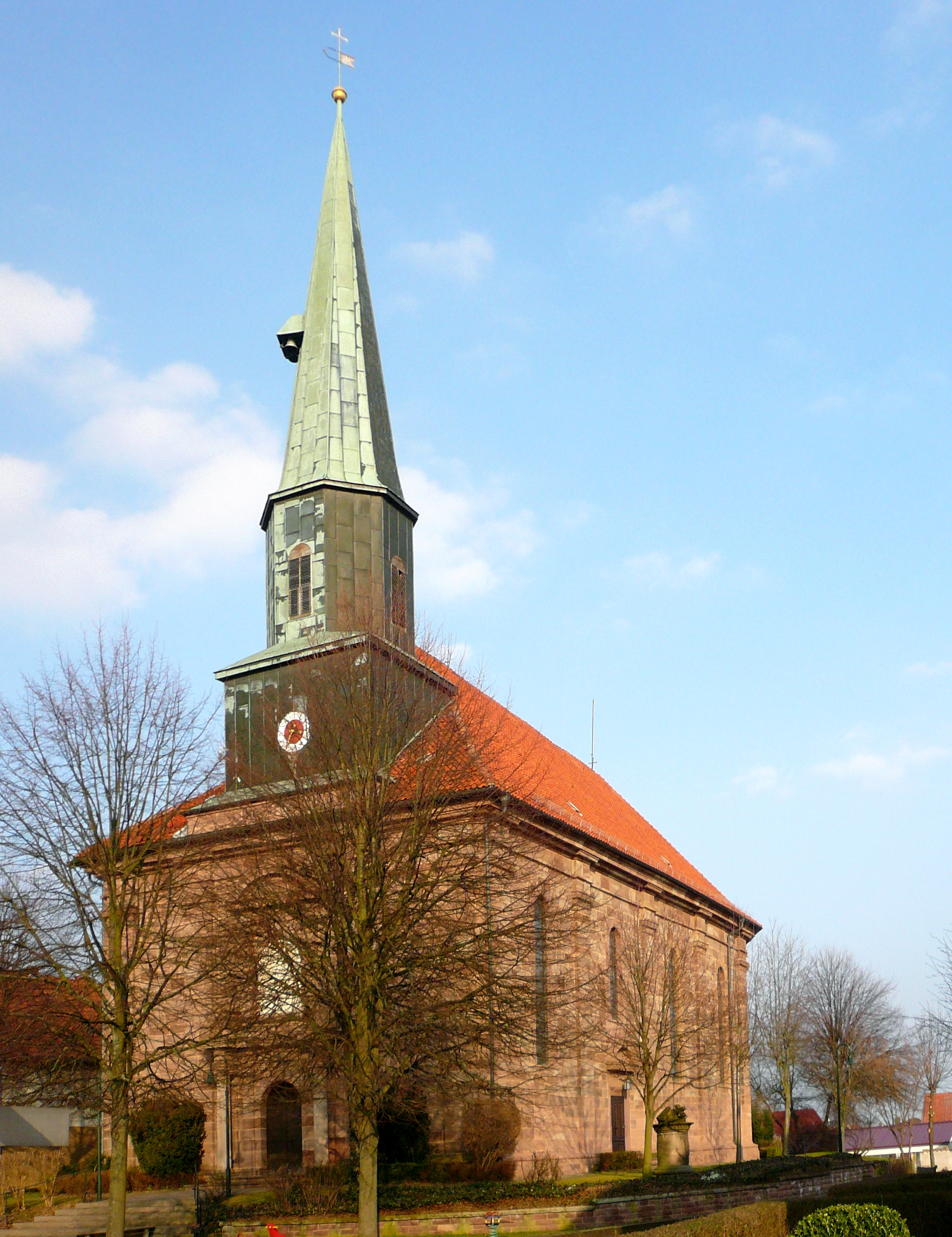
The catholic church
