= Obernfeld =

- Municipality
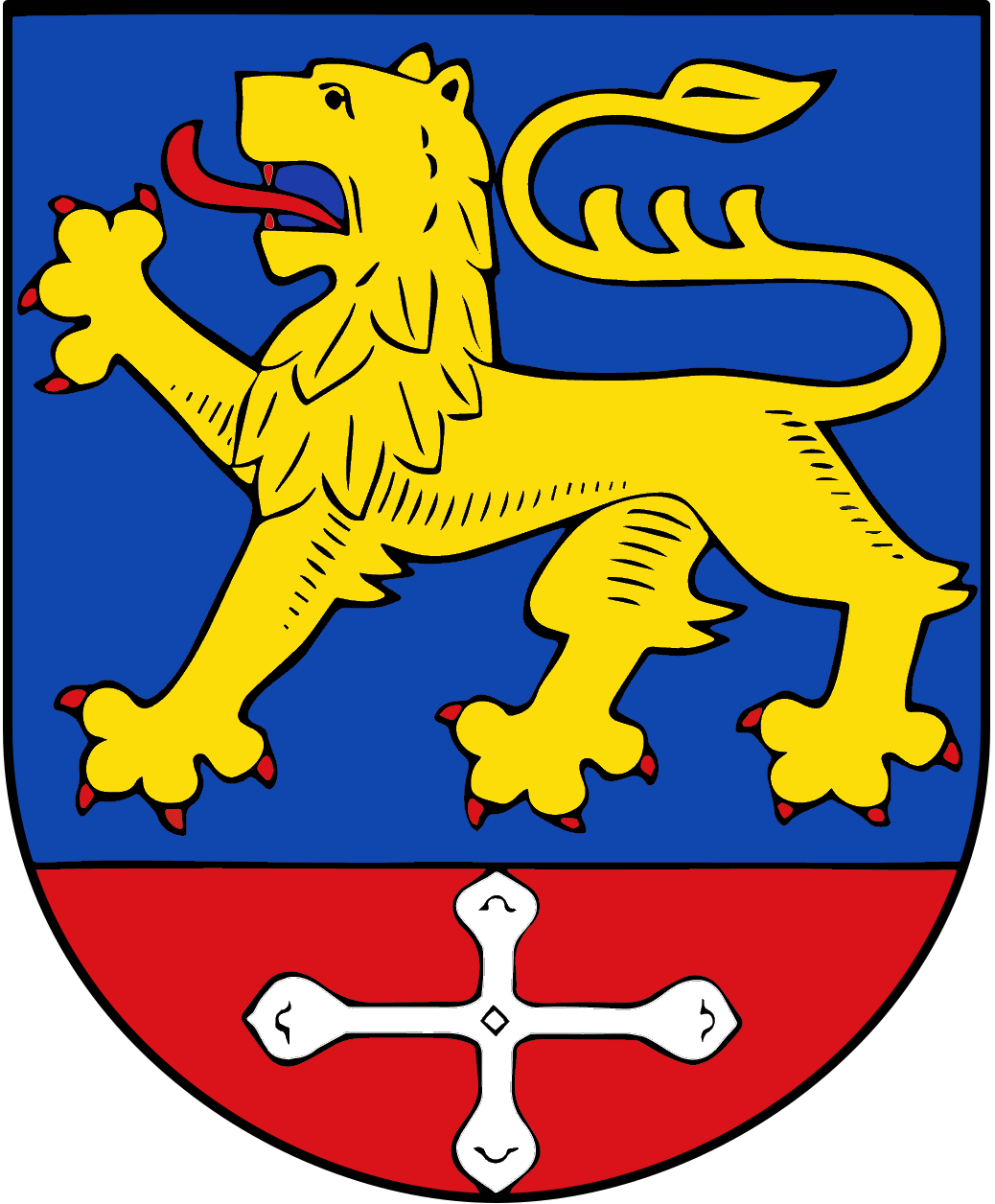
- Coat of arms

- Location of Obernfeld within Göttingen district
- Interactive map of Obernfeld
- Location within Germany Location within Lower Saxony
- Coordinates: 51°33′20″N 10°14′00″E
- Country: Germany
- State: Lower Saxony
- District: Göttingen
- Municipal assoc.: Gieboldehausen

Government
  - Mayor: Dietmar Ehbrecht (CDU)

Area
  - Total: 10.72 km^{2} (4.14 sq mi)
- Elevation: 171 m (561 ft)

Population (2025-12-31)
  - Total: 943
  - Density: 88.0/km^{2} (228/sq mi)
- Time zone: UTC+01:00 (CET)
  - Summer (DST): UTC+02:00 (CEST)
- Postal codes: 37434
- Dialling codes: 05527
- Vehicle registration: GÖ
- Website: www.obernfeld.de

Obernfeld is a municipality in the district of Göttingen, in Lower Saxony, Germany. It is part of the Eichsfeld.

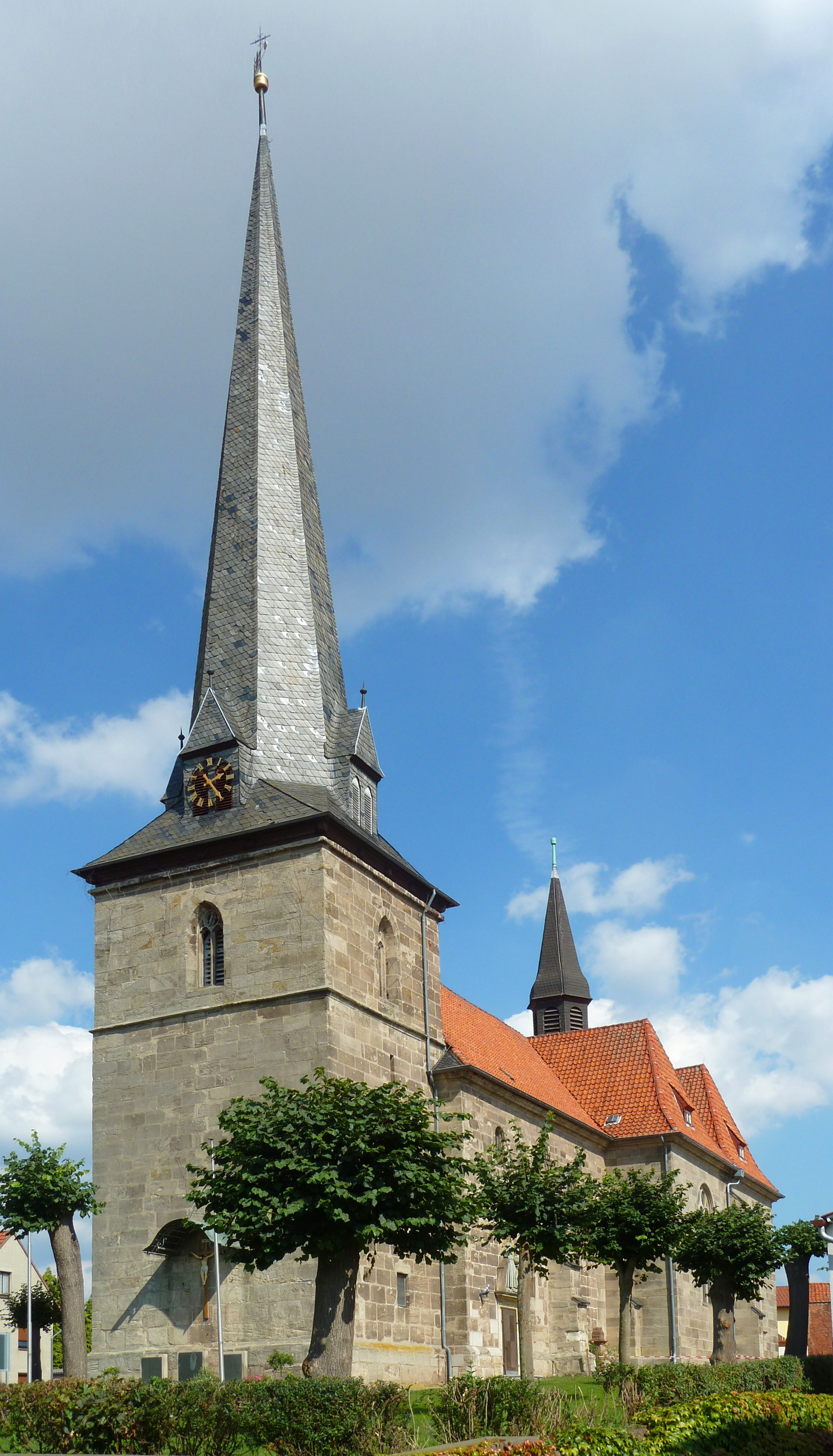
The Catholic Church
