= Central Germany =

Central Germany or Middle Germany (German: Zentraldeutschland or Mitteldeutschland) may refer to:

- Central Germany (linguistics) is the region where the Central German dialects are spoken
- Central Germany (geography) describes the regions in the geographic center of Germany
- Central Germany (cultural area) is the economic and cultural identity of a region in Germany. The name dates back to the 19th century, when the area was in a roughly central location in the German Empire
