= Rollshausen =

- Municipality
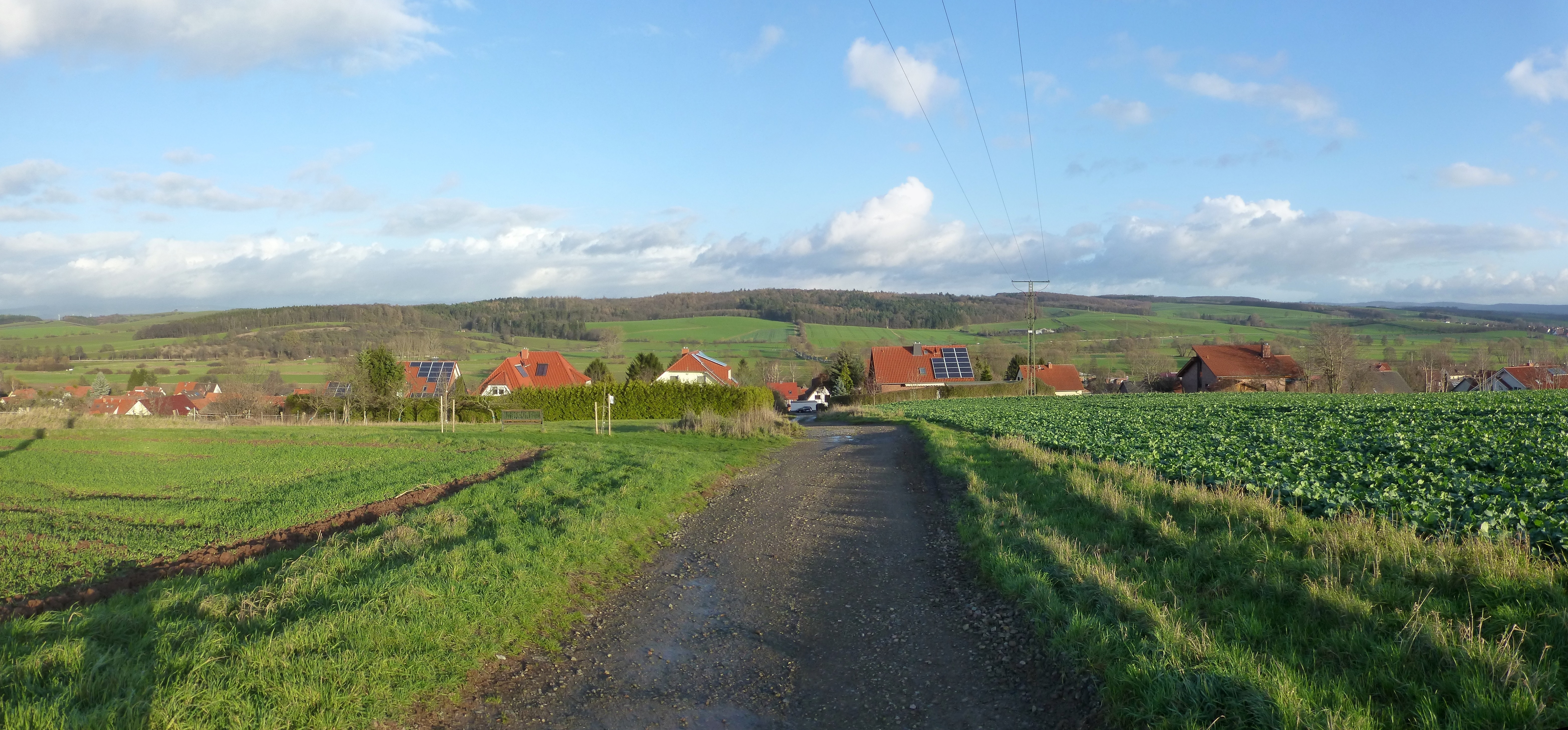

- Coat of arms

- Location of Rollshausen within Göttingen district
- Interactive map of Rollshausen
- Location within Germany Location within Lower Saxony
- Coordinates: 51°34′N 10°13′E
- Country: Germany
- State: Lower Saxony
- District: Göttingen
- Municipal assoc.: Gieboldehausen

Government
  - Mayor: Werner Koch

Area
  - Total: 11.68 km^{2} (4.51 sq mi)
- Elevation: 160 m (520 ft)

Population (2025-12-31)
  - Total: 833
  - Density: 71.3/km^{2} (185/sq mi)
- Time zone: UTC+01:00 (CET)
  - Summer (DST): UTC+02:00 (CEST)
- Postal codes: 37434
- Dialling codes: 05528
- Vehicle registration: GÖ

Rollshausen is a municipality in the district of Göttingen, in Lower Saxony, Germany. It is part of the Eichsfeld.

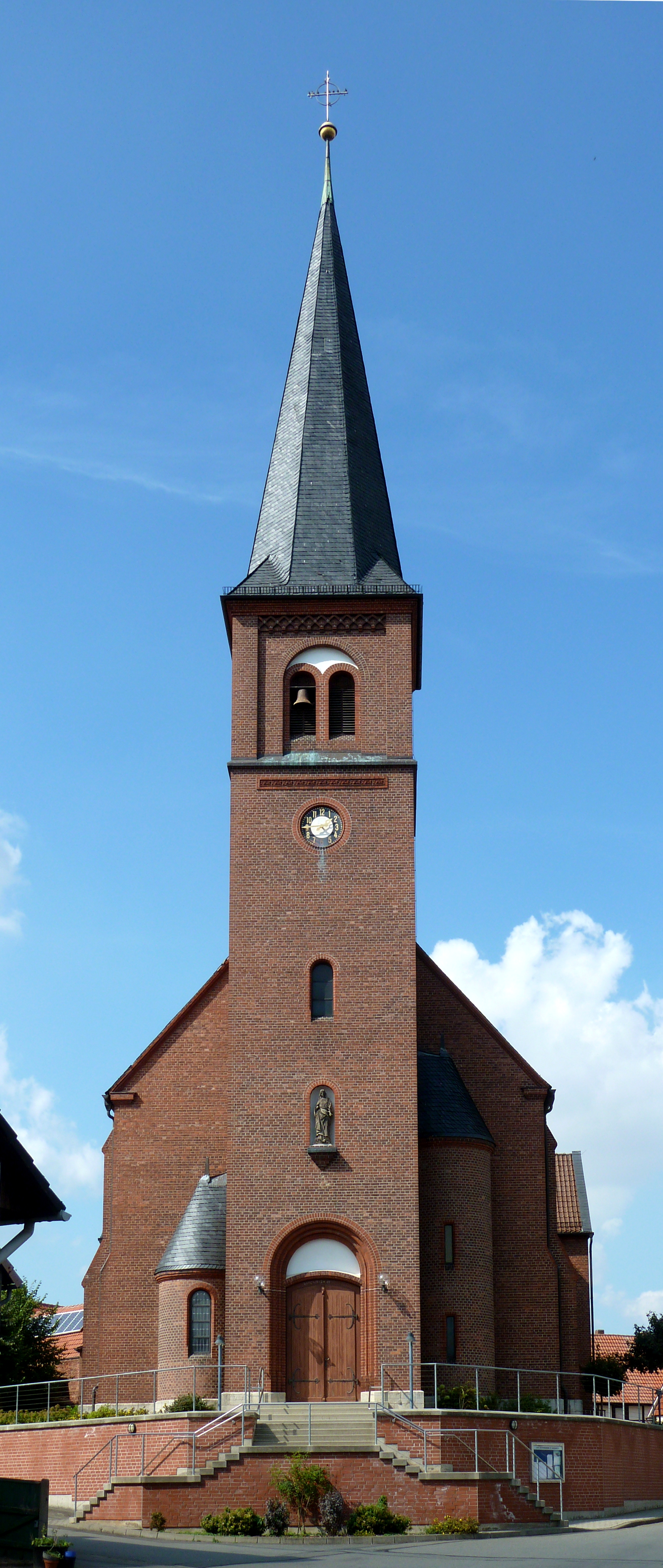
The Catholic Church
