= Rhumspringe =

- Municipality
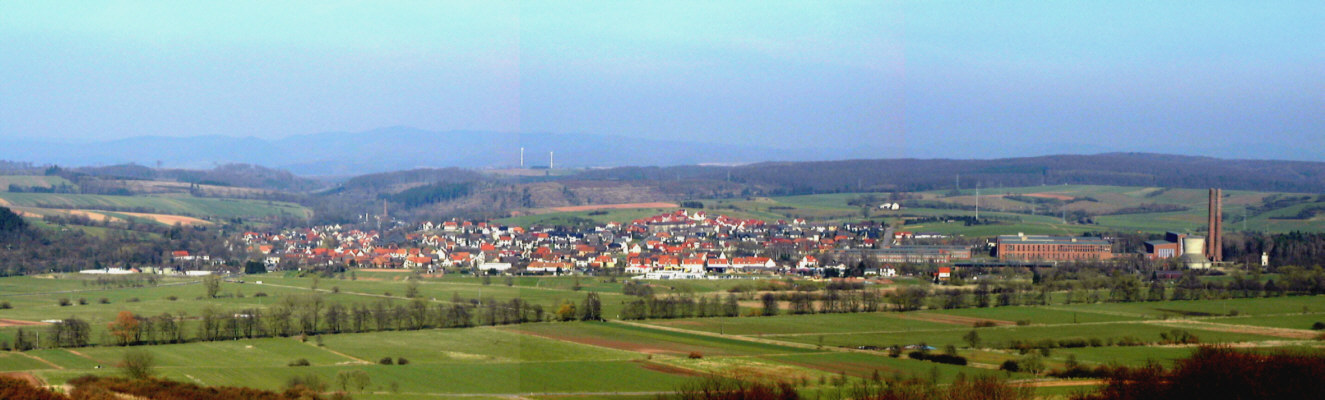

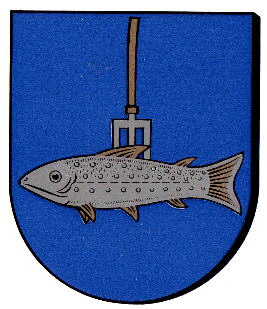
- Coat of arms

- Location of Rhumspringe within Göttingen district
- Interactive map of Rhumspringe
- Location within Germany Location within Lower Saxony
- Coordinates: 51°34′59″N 10°18′00″E
- Country: Germany
- State: Lower Saxony
- District: Göttingen
- Municipal assoc.: Gieboldehausen

Government
  - Mayor: Franz Jacobi (CDU)

Area
  - Total: 9.36 km^{2} (3.61 sq mi)
- Elevation: 193 m (633 ft)

Population (2025-12-31)
  - Total: 1,692
  - Density: 181/km^{2} (468/sq mi)
- Time zone: UTC+01:00 (CET)
  - Summer (DST): UTC+02:00 (CEST)
- Postal codes: 37434
- Dialling codes: 05529
- Vehicle registration: GÖ

Rhumspringe is a municipality in the district of Göttingen, in Lower Saxony, Germany. It is part of the Eichsfeld. The source of the river Rhume is at Rhume Spring in Rhumspringe.

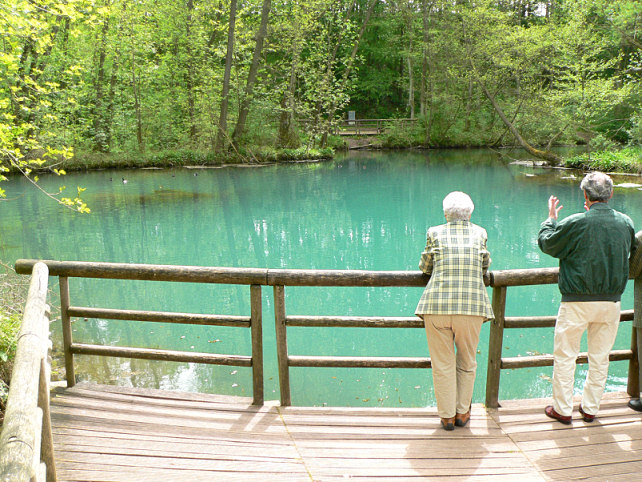
Rhume Spring
