= Rüdershausen =

- Municipality
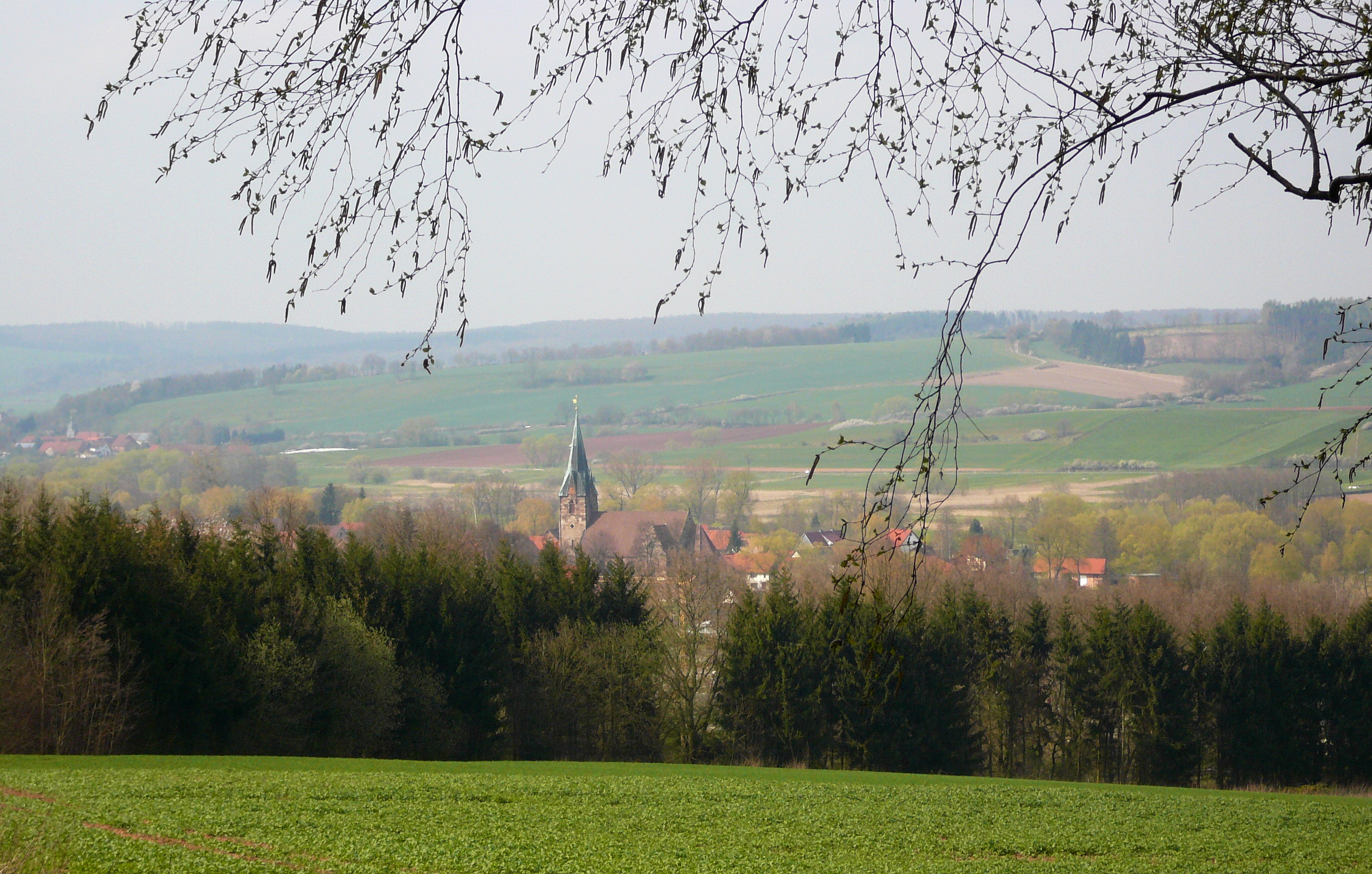

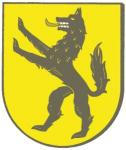
- Flag Coat of arms

- Location of Rüdershausen within Göttingen district
- Interactive map of Rüdershausen
- Location within Germany Location within Lower Saxony
- Coordinates: 51°35′N 10°16′E
- Country: Germany
- State: Lower Saxony
- District: Göttingen
- Municipal assoc.: Gieboldehausen

Government
  - Mayor: Annegret Lange (CDU)

Area
  - Total: 11.68 km^{2} (4.51 sq mi)
- Elevation: 153 m (502 ft)

Population (2025-12-31)
  - Total: 782
  - Density: 67.0/km^{2} (173/sq mi)
- Time zone: UTC+01:00 (CET)
  - Summer (DST): UTC+02:00 (CEST)
- Postal codes: 37434
- Dialling codes: 05529
- Vehicle registration: GÖ

Rüdershausen is a municipality in the district of Göttingen, in Lower Saxony, Germany. It is part of the Eichsfeld.

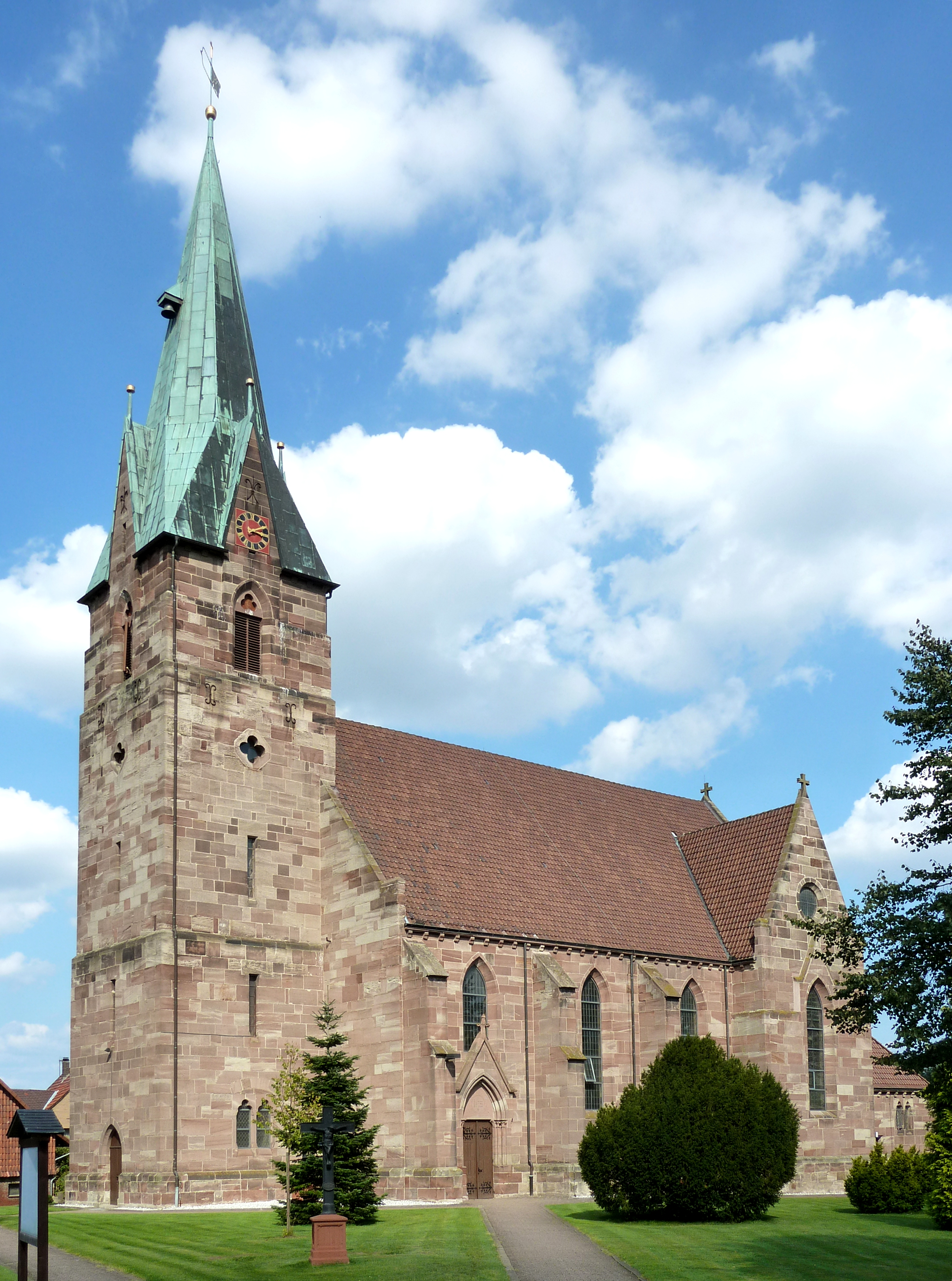
The Catholic Church
