= Wollershausen =

- Municipality
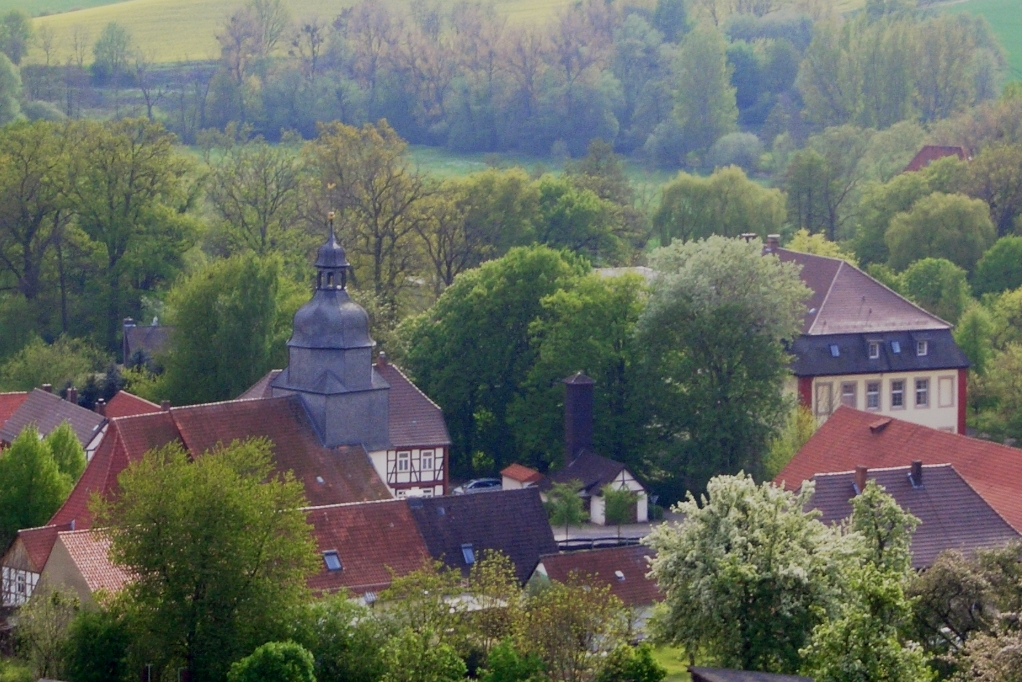

- Flag Coat of arms

- Location of Wollershausen within Göttingen district
- Interactive map of Wollershausen
- Location within Germany Location within Lower Saxony
- Coordinates: 51°36′N 10°15′E
- Country: Germany
- State: Lower Saxony
- District: Göttingen
- Municipal assoc.: Gieboldehausen

Government
  - Mayor: Ulrich Schakowske (SPD)

Area
  - Total: 9.15 km^{2} (3.53 sq mi)
- Elevation: 173 m (568 ft)

Population (2025-12-31)
  - Total: 472
  - Density: 51.6/km^{2} (134/sq mi)
- Time zone: UTC+01:00 (CET)
  - Summer (DST): UTC+02:00 (CEST)
- Postal codes: 37434
- Dialling codes: 05528
- Vehicle registration: GÖ
- Website: www.Wollershausen.de

Wollershausen is a municipality in the district of Göttingen, in Lower Saxony, Germany.

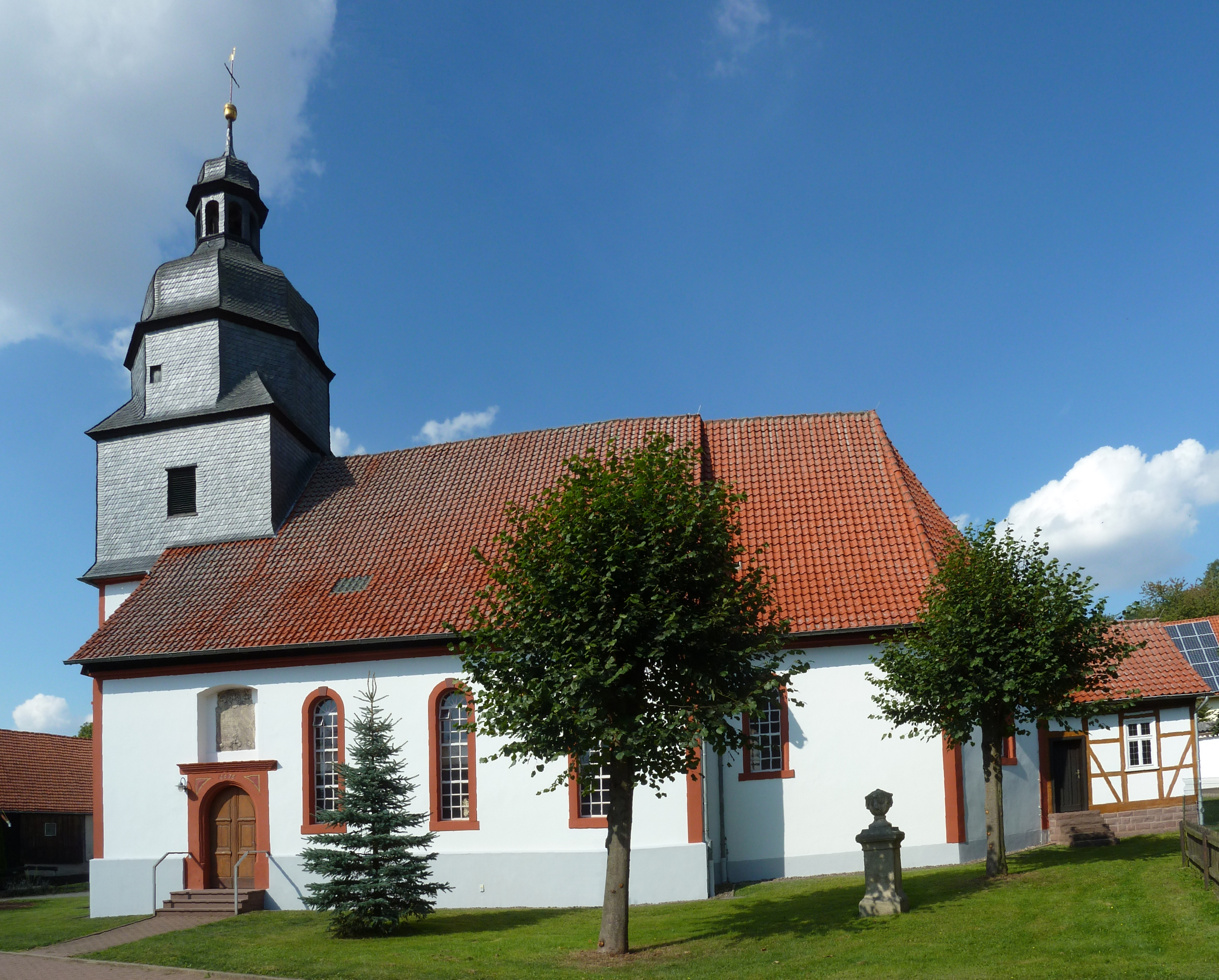
The Lutheran Church
