= Central Germany (geography) =

Areas surrounding the geographical centre of Germany

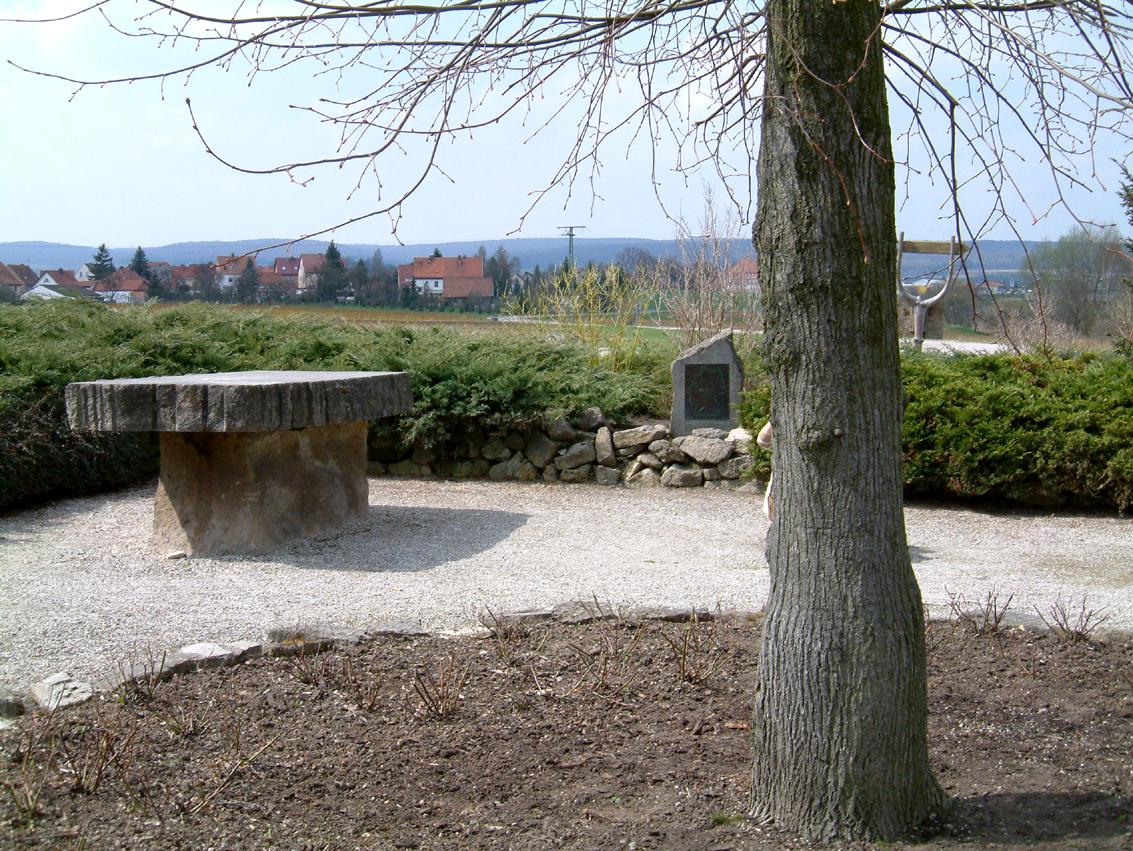
"Central point" in Niederdorla

Central Germany (German: Zentraldeutschland) or Middle Germany (Mitteldeutschland [ˈmɪtl̩ˌdɔʏtʃlant]), in geography, describes the areas surrounding the geographical centre of Germany.

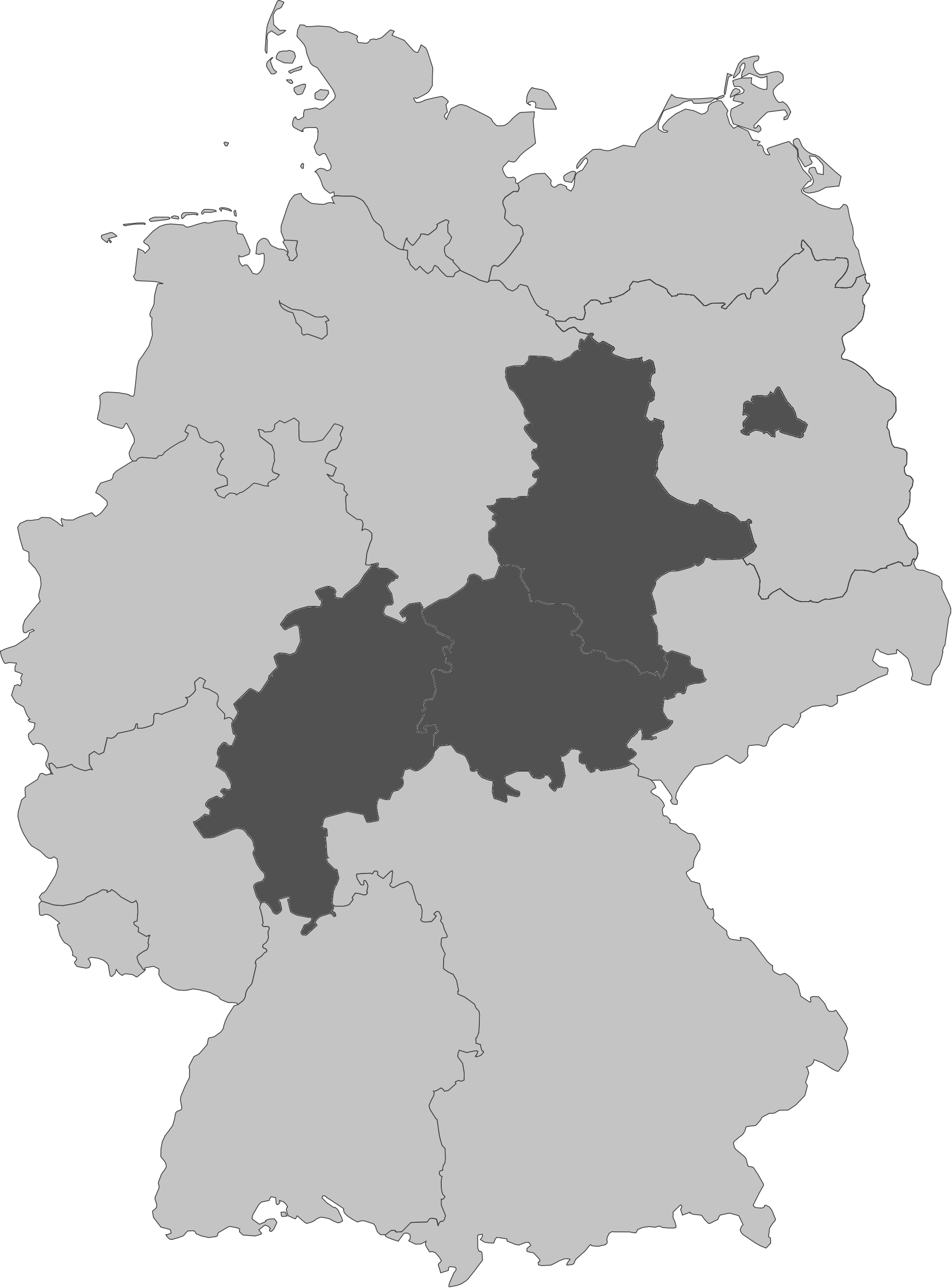
Landlocked German states without external borders

Berlin, Hesse, Saxony-Anhalt and Thuringia are the only landlocked German states without an international border.

== Geographical centre ==
The central point shifted several times during the country's eventful history. Today, Niederdorla, in the state of Thuringia, claims to be the most central municipality in Germany. A plaque was erected and a lime tree planted at 51°9′48.15″N 10°26′51.66″E after the 1990 German reunification. The point was confirmed as the centroid of the extreme coordinates by the Dresden University of Technology. Niederdorla is also the centre of gravity (equilibrium point), about 4.5 km (2.8 mi) to the southwest. Other municipalities claiming the title are Krebeck, in Lower Saxony, and Edermünde, in Hesse; the village of Landstreit, near Eisenach claims it as well.

The geographical centre of the German Empire from 1871 to 1919 was located at Spremberg, in the Province of Brandenburg, Prussia. The centroid of East Germany until 1990 was located between the villages of Verlorenwasser and Weitzgrund, near Bad Belzig.

== Topography ==
The German Central Uplands (Mittelgebirgsschwelle) is the Mittelgebirge area of low mountains and hills, comprising numerous individual ranges like the Rhenish Massif, the Lower Saxon Hills, the West and East Hesse Highlands, the Harz and the Thuringian-Franconian Highlands as well as the Bohemian Massif - in between the North German Plain and the Main river separating it from the South German Scarplands. The Thuringian Basin forms one of the core regions.

== See also ==
- Central German
- Central Germany (cultural area), often an area within the modern states of Saxony, Saxony-Anhalt and Thuringia
