= Gieboldehausen =

- Municipality
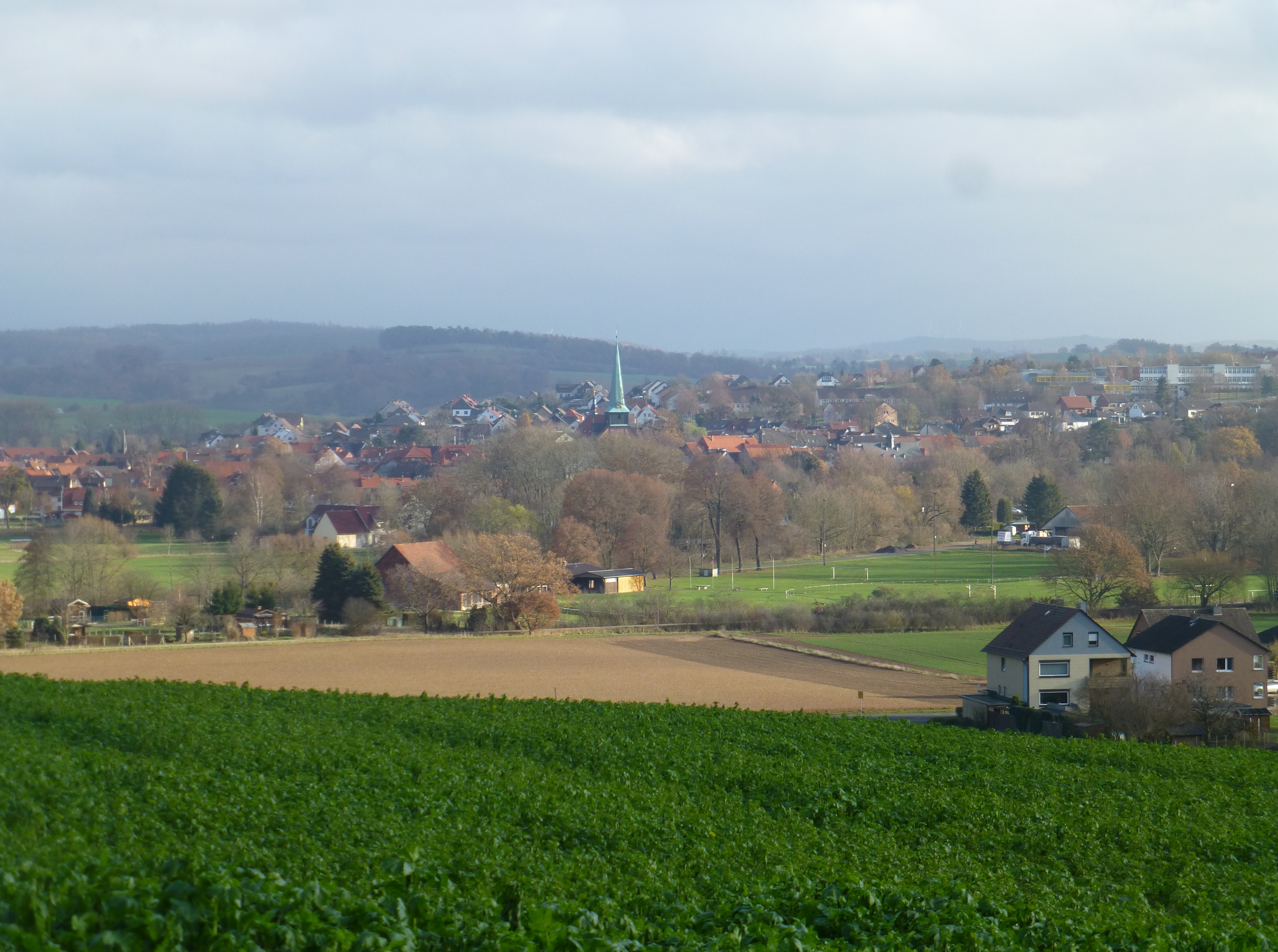

- Coat of arms

- Location of Gieboldehausen within Göttingen district
- Interactive map of Gieboldehausen
- Location within Germany Location within Lower Saxony
- Coordinates: 51°36′39″N 10°12′53″E
- Country: Germany
- State: Lower Saxony
- District: Göttingen
- Municipal assoc.: Gieboldehausen
- First mentioned: 1003

Government
  - Mayor: Maria Bock (CDU)

Area
  - Total: 19.86 km^{2} (7.67 sq mi)
- Elevation: 150 m (490 ft)

Population (2025-12-31)
  - Total: 3,738
  - Density: 188.2/km^{2} (487.5/sq mi)
- Time zone: UTC+01:00 (CET)
  - Summer (DST): UTC+02:00 (CEST)
- Postal codes: 37434
- Dialling codes: 05528
- Vehicle registration: GÖ / DUD
- Website: www.gieboldehausen.de

Gieboldehausen is a municipality in the district of Göttingen, in Lower Saxony, Germany. It is situated on the river Rhume, approx. 25 km northeast of Göttingen, and 15 km south of Osterode am Harz. It is part of the Eichsfeld.

Gieboldehausen is also the seat of the Samtgemeinde ("collective municipality") Gieboldehausen.
