= Gieboldehausen (Samtgemeinde) =

- Samtgemeinde
- Location of Gieboldehausen within Göttingen district
- Interactive map of Gieboldehausen
- Location within Germany Location within Lower Saxony
- Coordinates: 51°37′N 10°13′E
- Country: Germany
- State: Lower Saxony
- District: Göttingen
- Seat: Gieboldehausen
- Subdivisions: 10 municipalities

Area
  - Total: 104.67 km^{2} (40.41 sq mi)

Population (2025-12-31)
  - Total: 13,065
  - Density: 124.82/km^{2} (323.28/sq mi)
- Time zone: UTC+01:00 (CET)
  - Summer (DST): UTC+02:00 (CEST)
- Website: www.samtgemeinde-gieboldehausen.de

Gieboldehausen is a Samtgemeinde ("collective municipality") in the district of Göttingen, in Lower Saxony, Germany. Its seat is in the municipality Gieboldehausen.

The Samtgemeinde Gieboldehausen consists of the following municipalities:

1. Bilshausen
2. Bodensee
3. Gieboldehausen
4. Krebeck
5. Obernfeld
6. Rhumspringe
7. Rollshausen
8. Rüdershausen
9. Wollbrandshausen
10. Wollershausen
