= Rhume =

River in Germany

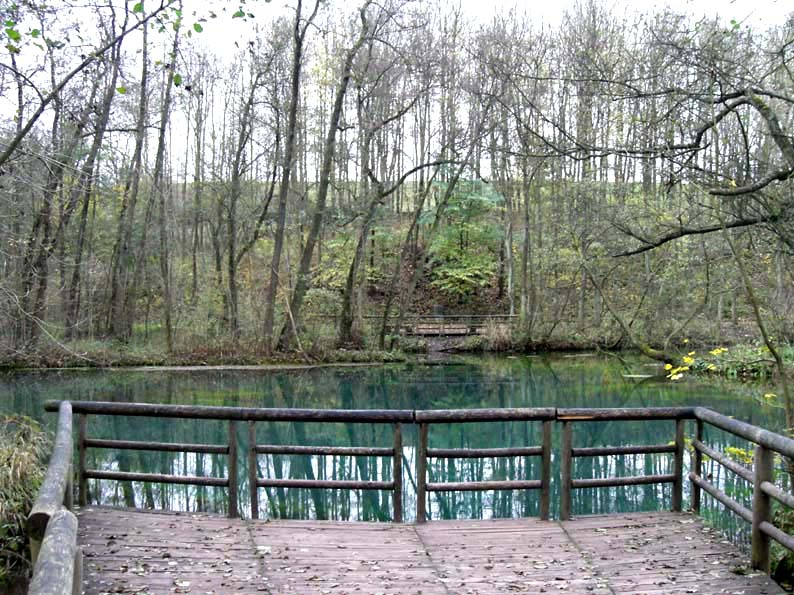
- Rhume source

Location
- Country: Germany
- State: Lower Saxony

Physical characteristics
- Source
  - location: Lower Saxony
  - coordinates: 51°35′23″N 10°18′36″E
  - elevation: 160 m (520 ft)
- Mouth
  - location: Leine
  - coordinates: 51°43′43″N 9°56′52″E
- Length: 48 km (30 mi)
- Basin size: 1,187 km^{2} (458 sq mi)

Basin features
- Progression: Leine→ Aller→ Weser→ North Sea

The Rhume (German pronunciation: [ˈʁuːmə]) is a 48 km (30 mi) long river in Lower Saxony, Germany. It is a right tributary of the Leine. Its source is the karstic spring of Rhume Spring in Rhumspringe, south of the Harz mountain range. The water drains with high pressure from the ground of the funnel-shaped well, known for its turquoise colour.

The Rhume then flows in northwesterly direction through the municipalities of Gieboldehausen, Katlenburg-Lindau and Northeim. It finally joins the Leine river west of Northeim.

== Tributaries ==
- Eller
- Hahle
- Oder
- Söse
- Düne (also called Uhbach)

== See also ==
- List of rivers of Lower Saxony
