= Krebeck =

- Municipality
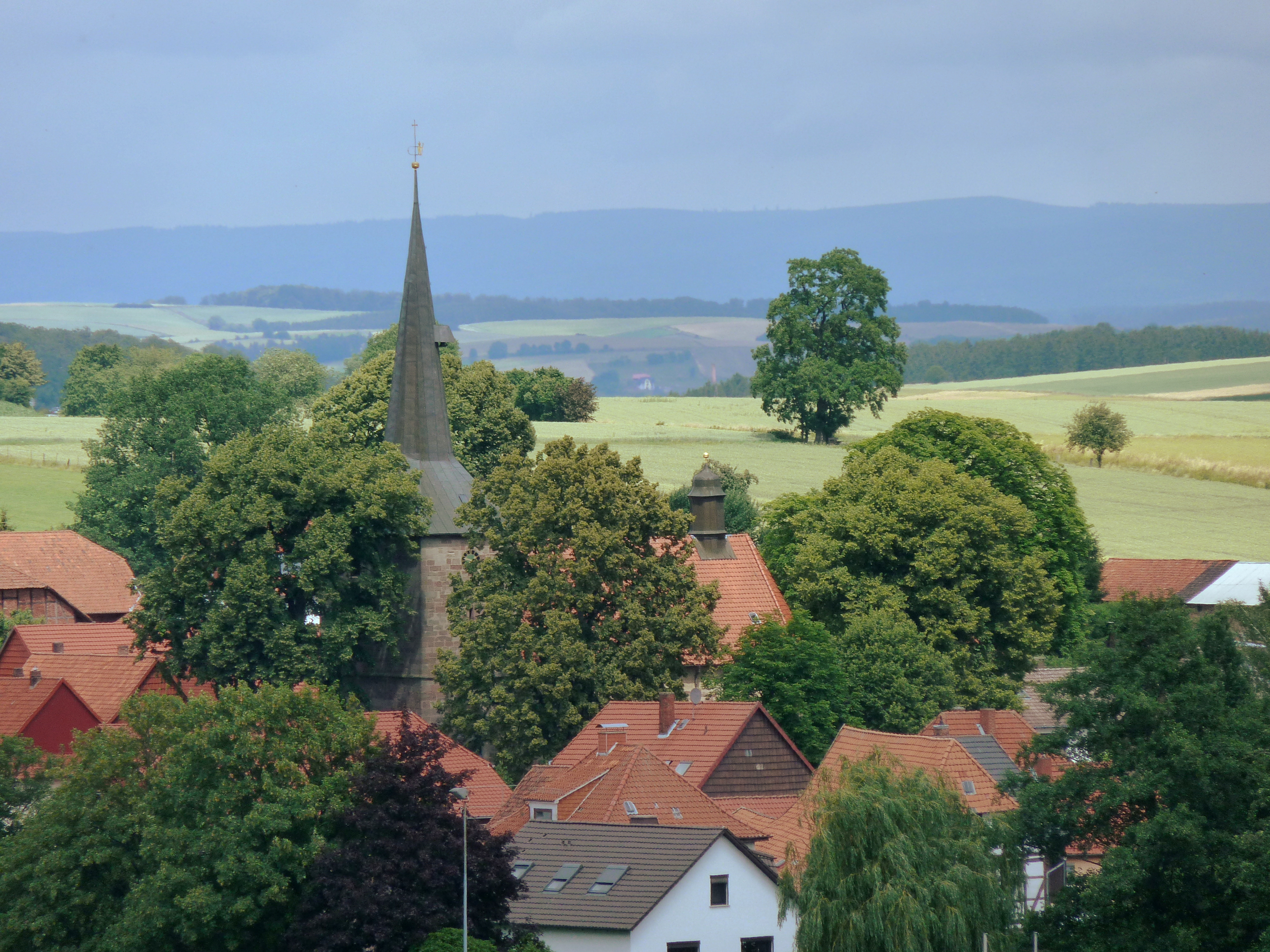

- Flag Coat of arms

- Location of Krebeck within Göttingen district
- Interactive map of Krebeck
- Location within Germany Location within Lower Saxony
- Coordinates: 51°35′N 10°07′E
- Country: Germany
- State: Lower Saxony
- District: Göttingen
- Municipal assoc.: Gieboldehausen

Government
  - Mayor: Josef Sorhage (CDU)

Area
  - Total: 12.26 km^{2} (4.73 sq mi)
- Elevation: 172 m (564 ft)

Population (2025-12-31)
  - Total: 1,019
  - Density: 83.12/km^{2} (215.3/sq mi)
- Time zone: UTC+01:00 (CET)
  - Summer (DST): UTC+02:00 (CEST)
- Postal codes: 37434
- Dialling codes: 05507
- Vehicle registration: GÖ
- Website: www.gemeinde-krebeck.de

Krebeck (German pronunciation: [ˈkʁeːbeːk]) is a municipality in the district of Göttingen, in Lower Saxony, Germany.
