= Borderland Museum Eichsfeld =

Museum in Germany

Coordinates: 51°28′56.5″N 10°15′43″E

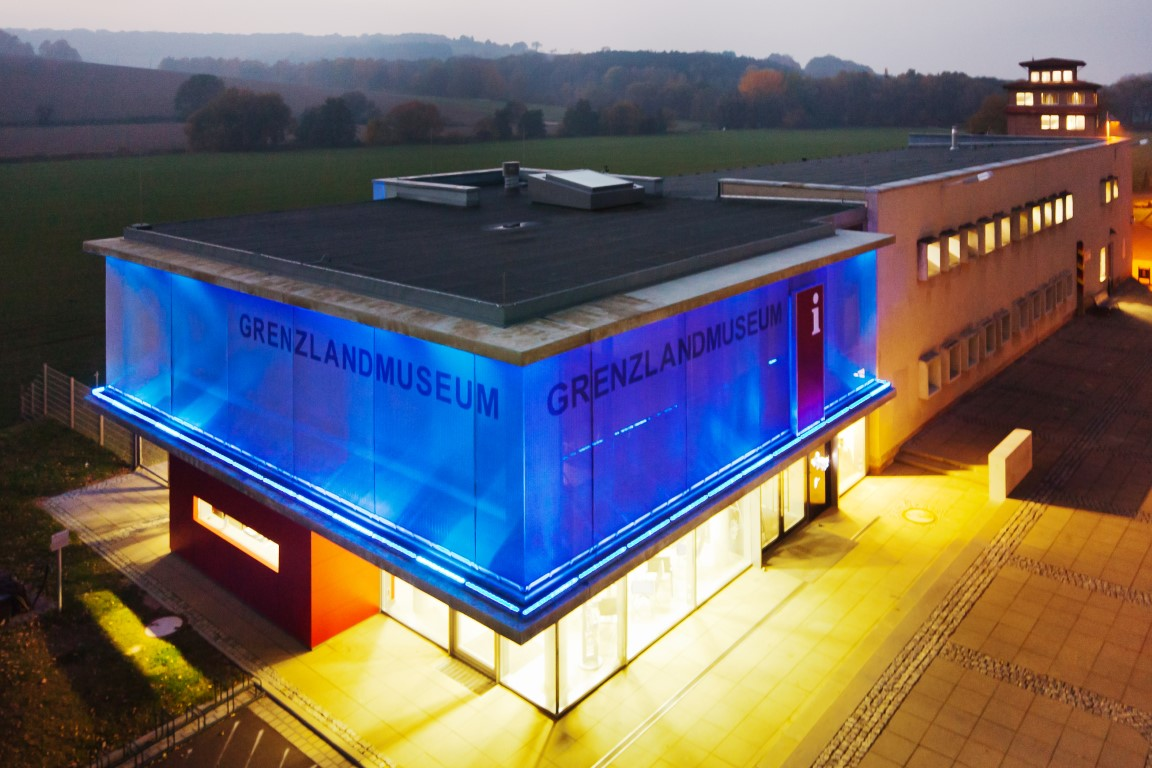
Borderland Museum Eichsfeld in Thuringia, Germany.

Borderland Museum Eichsfeld, Thuringia

The Borderland Museum Eichsfeld is a history museum located in Central Germany at the former inner-German border between East and West Germany. It deals with the Cold War in general and the German division in specific.

The museum exhibitions are situated in a complex of buildings at a former border crossing point near Göttingen and Kassel in the Eichsfeld region.

The museum area also includes a circular hiking trail. It leads along the former Iron Curtain, which was transformed into the European Green Belt after the Cold War had ended.

== Historical development ==
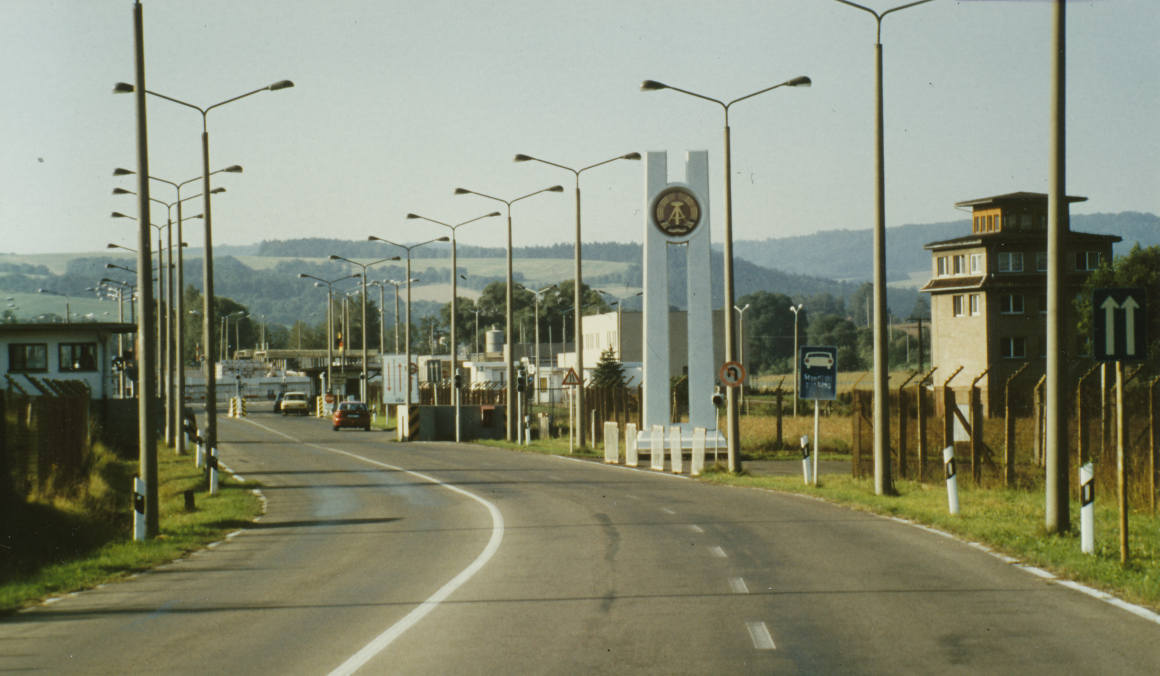
Border crossing point Duderstadt-Worbis. After the German reunification, the Borderland Museum Eichsfeld was opened in these buildings in 1995.

After the end of World War II, defeated Germany was divided into four occupation zones. The Eichsfeld region and many families who lived here were separated by the British and the Soviet zone, and from 1949 onwards by the two German states.

As early as the 1950s and '60s, the Eichsfeld region was the site of mass expulsions from the border area and dramatic escape attempts from East to West Germany. What started as a demarcation line turned into a heavily guarded border with barbed wire fences, minefields and observation towers.

Here a border crossing point was established in summer 1973, which was used by millions of travellers, mostly West Germans, until the opening of the GDR borders in 1989. Passport controls were abandoned shortly after midnight on 10 November 1989, resulting from the fall of the Berlin Wall.

In July 1990, three months ahead of the German reunification, the border and its crossing point had lost their purpose.

== Exhibition ==
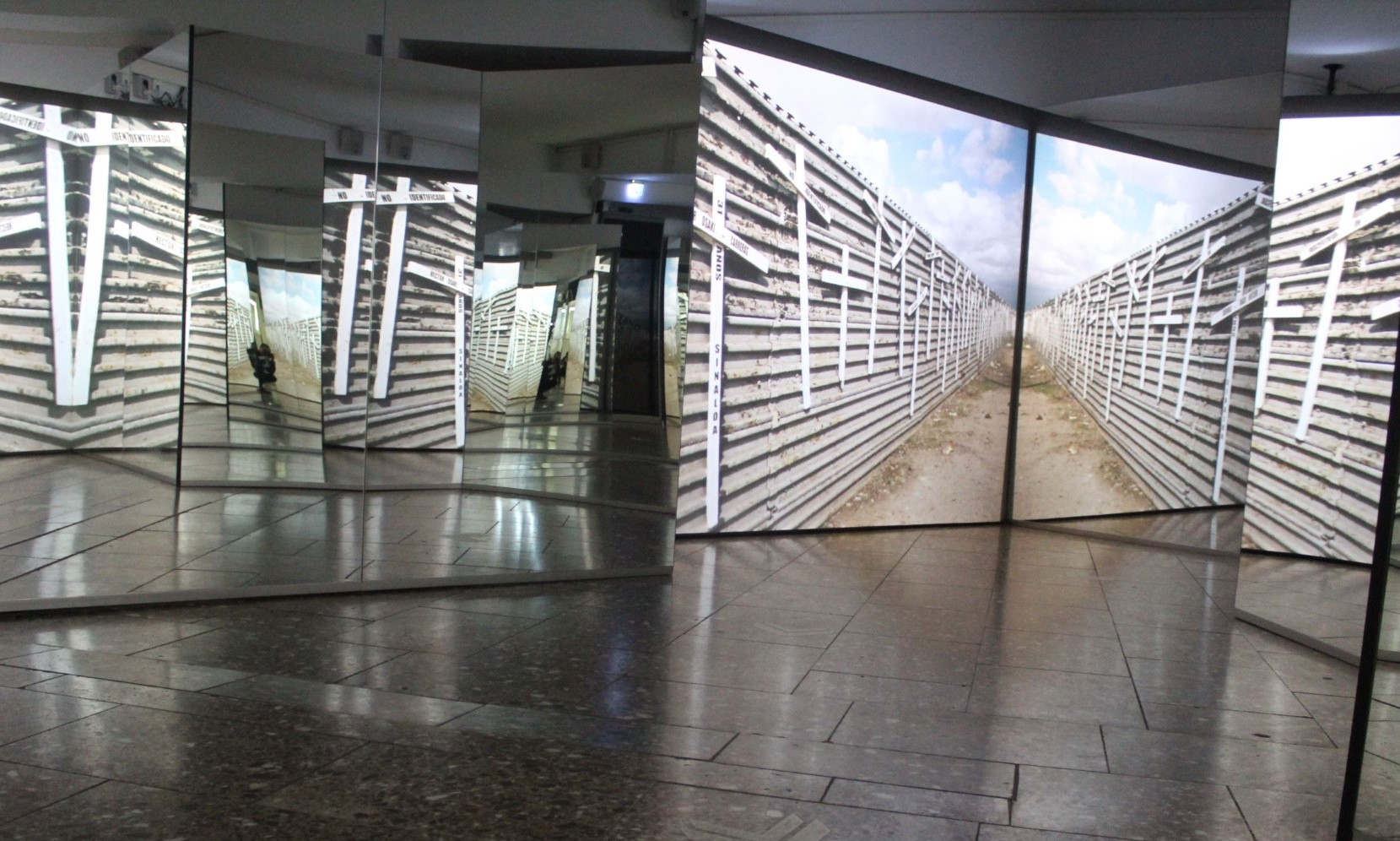
The Hall of Mirrors at the Borderland Museum Eichsfeld shows pictures and short films of borders around the world.

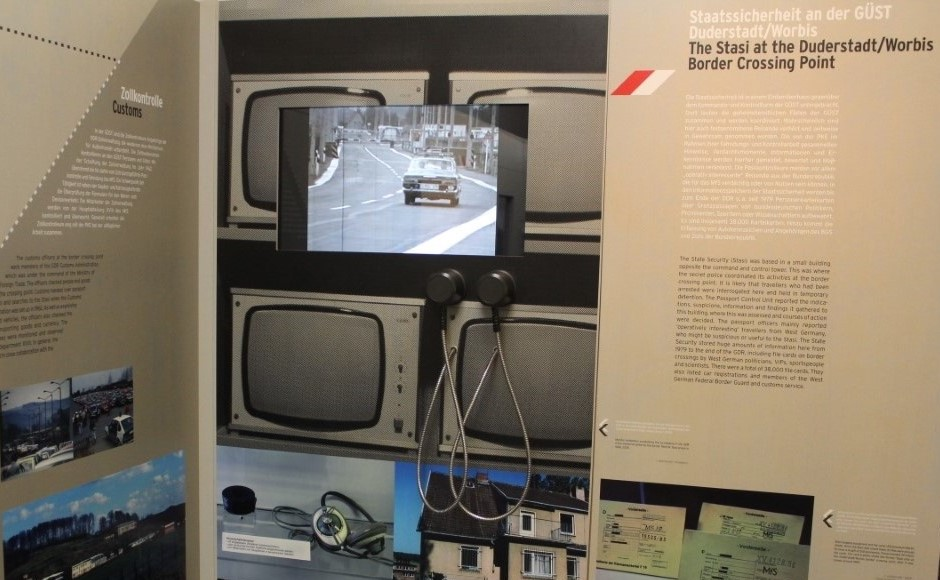
An insight into the permanent exhibition of the Borderland Museum Eichsfeld.

At this historical place the Borderland Museum Eichsfeld was opened in 1995. It is located in the original buildings of the former border crossing point, allowing its visitors to see the original rooms, such as the passport checking rooms and the detention cells.

The museum presents various aspects of the history of the GDR and the division of Germany on an area of 1000 square metres. All the information in the museum is displayed in both German and English.

The permanent exhibition deals with the division of Germany, the GDR border regime and the everyday life of East and West Germans living in the border area. Further topics include the organization of state and society in communist East Germany and the role of the Stasi as well as the Peaceful Revolution and the border opening in 1989.

Additionally to the permanent exhibition, the Borderland Museum also offers special exhibitions on a regular basis.

The museum has 45,000 to 60,000 visitors from all over the world every year.

== Open-air museum ==
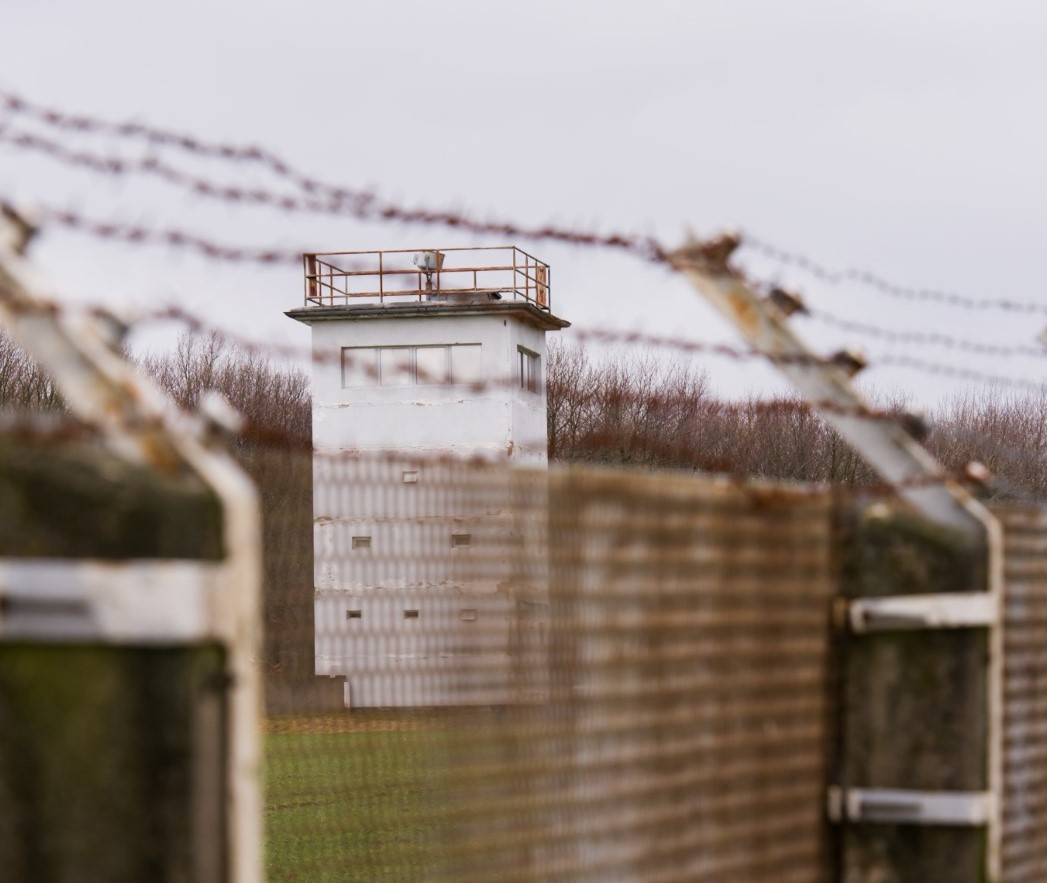
Observation tower of the GDR border troops and part of the original fence.

A six kilometres long circular trail leads from the Borderland Museum Eichsfeld across the borderland, featuring multiple information panels about the former border. On their way along the former inner-German border, the visitors can take a look at preserved parts of the original border installations, such as observation towers of the GDR border troops and the Federal Border Guards.

As the museum is part of the European Green Belt, it also addresses ecological topics, natural borders and the ecological impact of the Iron Curtain.
