= Bilshausen =

- Municipality
- Flag Coat of arms

- Location of Bilshausen within Göttingen district
- Interactive map of Bilshausen
- Location within Germany Location within Lower Saxony
- Coordinates: 51°37′50″N 10°09′30″E
- Country: Germany
- State: Lower Saxony
- District: Göttingen
- Municipal assoc.: Gieboldehausen

Government
  - Mayor: Matthias Diederich (CDU)

Area
  - Total: 8.49 km^{2} (3.28 sq mi)
- Elevation: 176 m (577 ft)

Population (2025-12-31)
  - Total: 2,200
  - Density: 260/km^{2} (670/sq mi)
- Time zone: UTC+01:00 (CET)
  - Summer (DST): UTC+02:00 (CEST)
- Postal codes: 37434
- Dialling codes: 05528
- Vehicle registration: GÖ
- Website: www.bilshausen.de

Bilshausen is a municipality in the district of Göttingen, in Lower Saxony, Germany. It is part of the Eichsfeld.

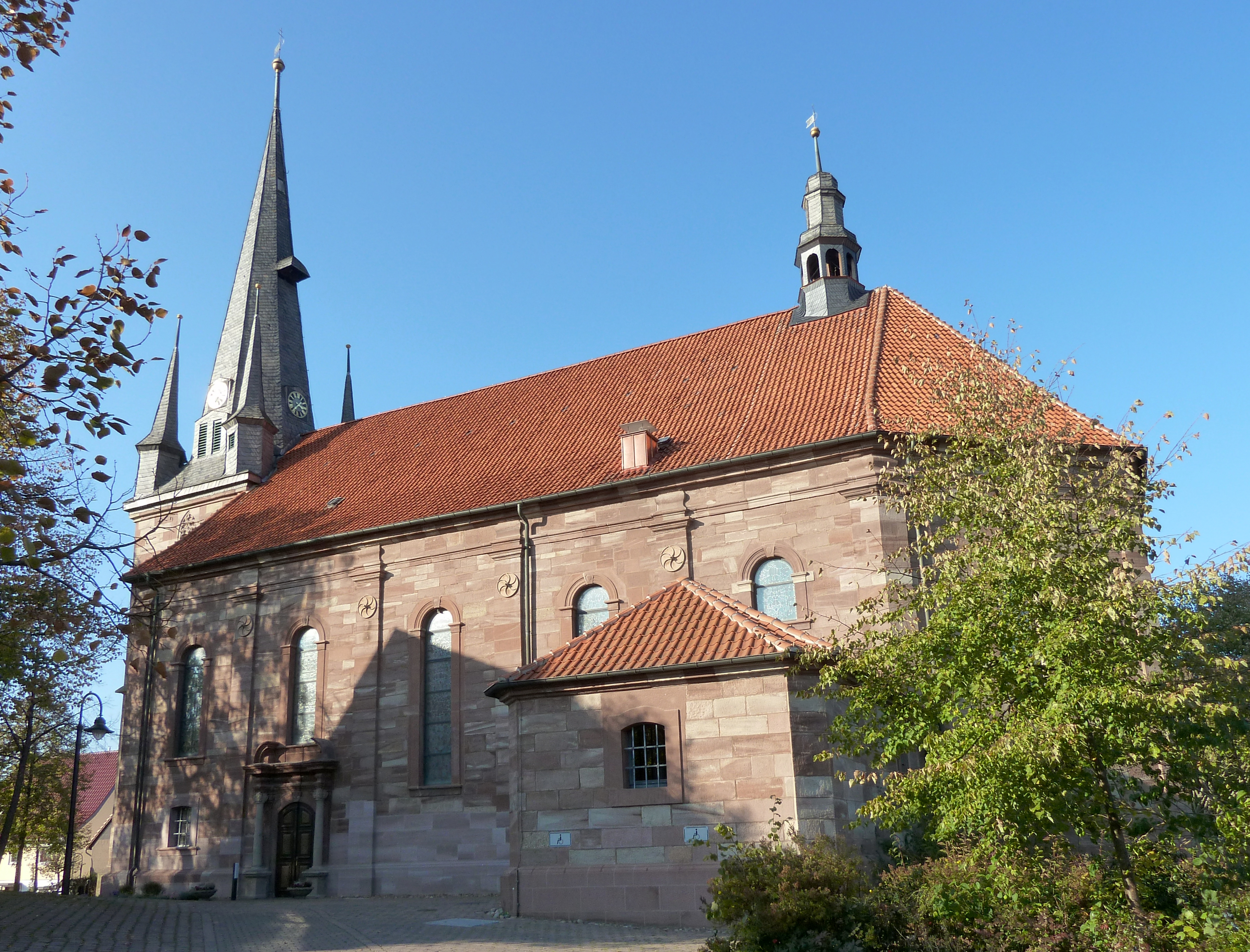
The Catholic Church
