= Göttingen (district) =

District in Lower Saxony, Germany

Coordinates: 51°30′N 9°55′E

- District
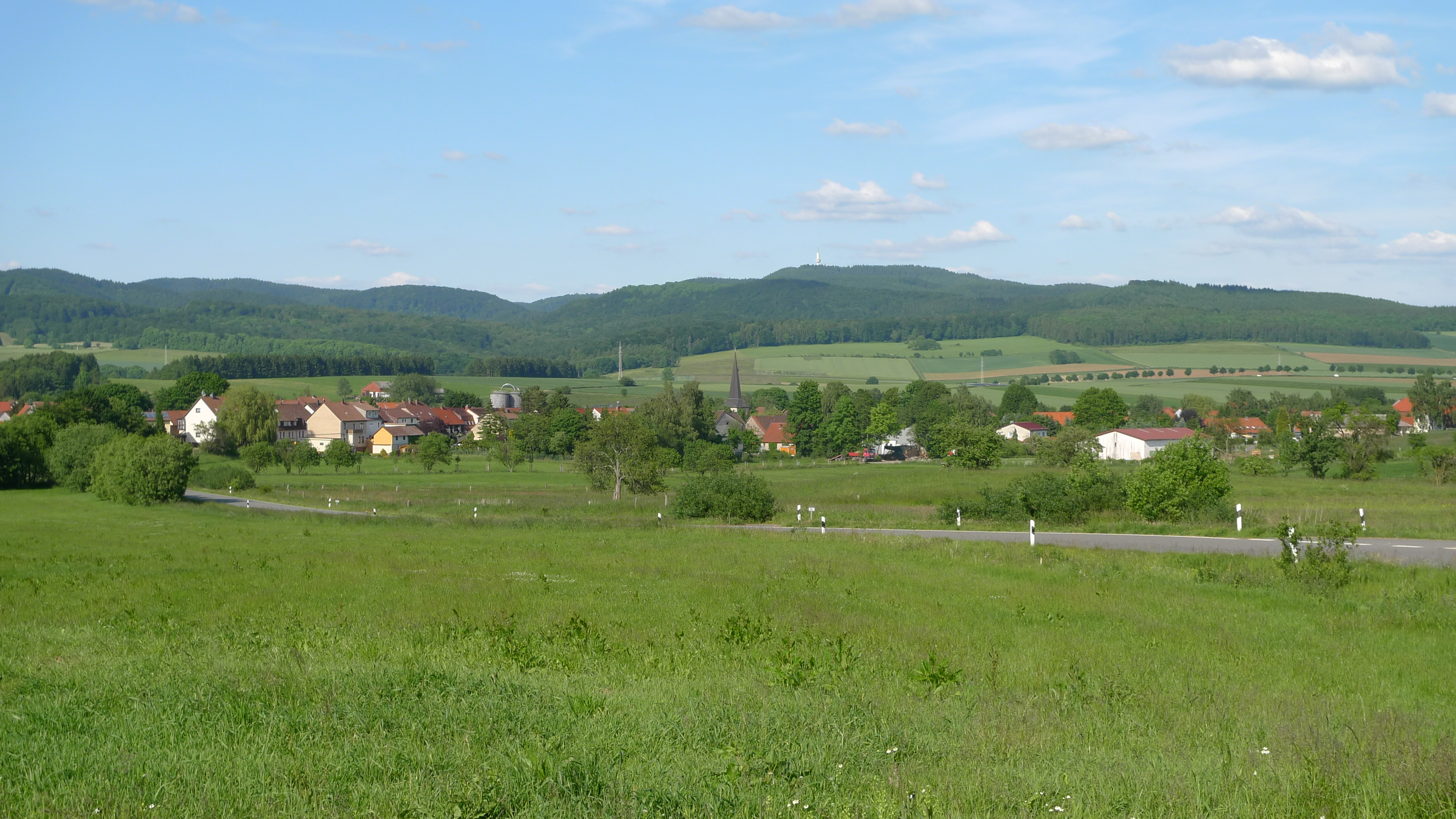

- Flag Coat of arms
- Country: Germany
- State: Lower Saxony
- Capital: Göttingen

Government
  - District admin.: Marcel Riethig (SPD)

Area
  - Total: 1,753 km^{2} (677 sq mi)

Population (31 December 2024)
  - Total: 328,028
  - Density: 187.1/km^{2} (484.6/sq mi)
- Time zone: UTC+01:00 (CET)
  - Summer (DST): UTC+02:00 (CEST)
- Vehicle registration: GÖ, DUD, HMÜ, OHA
- Website: landkreis-goettingen.de

Göttingen (German pronunciation: [ˈɡœtɪŋən]) is a district (German: Landkreis) in Lower Saxony, Germany. It is bounded by (from the northwest and clockwise) the districts of Northeim and Goslar, and by the states of Thuringia (district of Eichsfeld) and Hesse (districts of Werra-Meißner and Kassel, and the district-free city of Kassel). The capital is the university city of Göttingen.

== History ==
In 1885 the Prussian government established the districts of Göttingen, Münden and Duderstadt within the Province of Hanover. These districts existed for 88 years, before they were merged in 1973 to form the present district of Göttingen.

In 1964, the formerly district-free Göttingen city was incorporated into the district.

On 1 November 2016, it was reformed by the addition of the former district of Osterode.

== Geography ==
The western half of the district is occupied by the Weserbergland mountains. The Weser River receives its name near the town of Hannoversch Münden, where the Fulda joins the Werra. Further east the Leine river runs through the district from south to north.

== Sights and museums ==
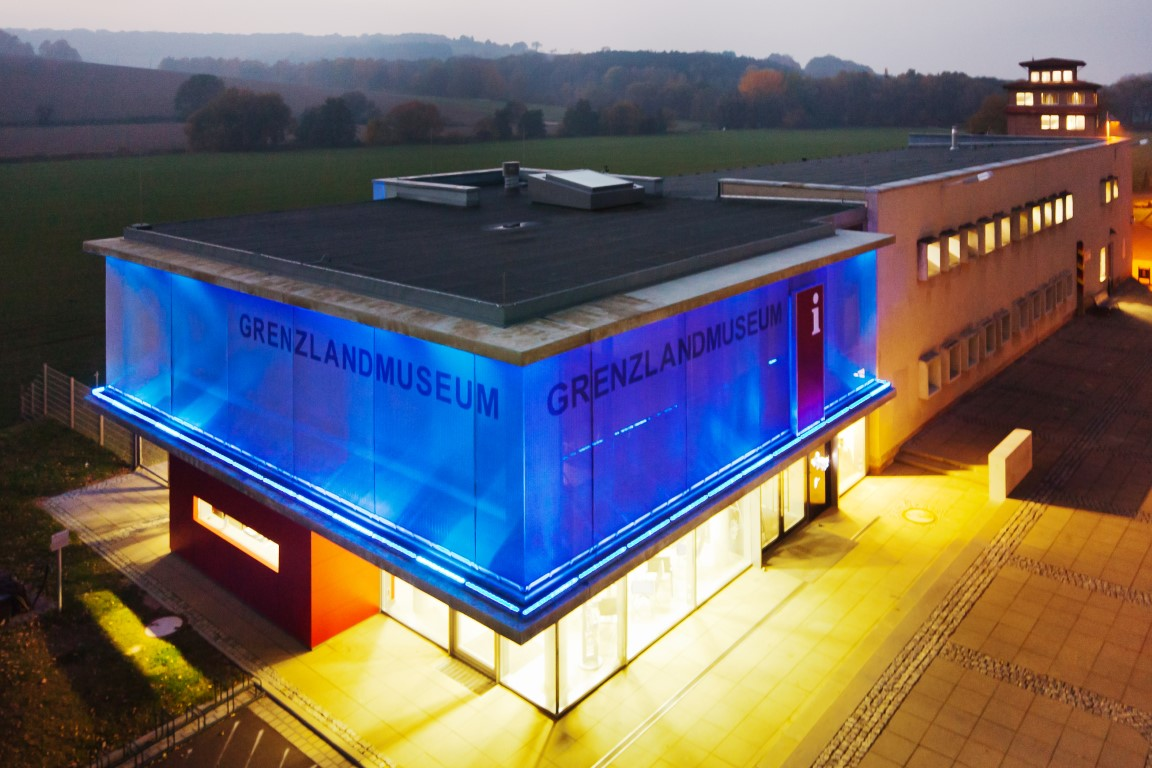
The Borderland Museum Eichsfeld in the district of Göttingen

A popular museum in the district of Göttingen is the Borderland Museum Eichsfeld which attracts around 50,000 visitors from many countries every year. It deals with the inner-German border and the history of the GDR. The museum area includes a hiking trail along the former Iron Curtain.

== Coat of arms ==
In the upper part is the heraldic lion of the Duchy of Brunswick-Lüneburg. Below is a combination of the arms of the former districts, which were merged in 1973 to form the present district: the shield of Münden, the anchor of Göttingen, and the wheel of Duderstadt.

== Towns and municipalities ==
Clickable map of towns and municipalities in the district

Towns	Samtgemeinden
1. Bad Grund; 2. Bad Lauterberg; 3. Bad Sachsa; 4. Duderstadt; 5. Göttingen; 6. Hann. Münden; 7. Herzberg am Harz; 8. Osterode am Harz; 9. Walkenried; Free municipalities: 1. Adelebsen; 2. Bovenden; 3. Friedland; 4. Gleichen; 5. Rosdorf; 6. Staufenberg; Unincorporated area: Harz (267.37 km², uninhabited)	1. Dransfeld; 1. Bühren; 2. Dransfeld^{1, 2}; 3. Jühnde; 4. Niemetal; 5. Scheden	2. Gieboldehausen; 1. Bilshausen; 2. Bodensee; 3. Gieboldehausen^{1}; 4. Krebeck; 5. Obernfeld; 6. Rhumspringe; 7. Rollshausen; 8. Rüdershausen; 9. Wollbrandshausen; 10. Wollershausen	3. Hattorf am Harz; 1. Elbingerode; 2. Hattorf am Harz^{1}; 3. Hörden am Harz; 4. Wulften am Harz	4. Radolfshausen; 1. Ebergötzen^{1}; 2. Landolfshausen; 3. Seeburg; 4. Seulingen; 5. Waake
	^{1}seat of the Samtgemeinde; ^{2}town

== See also ==
- Metropolitan region Hannover-Braunschweig-Göttingen-Wolfsburg
