= Eichsfeld =

Historical region in Lower Saxony and Thuringia, Germany

Coordinates: 51°19′48″N 10°15′00″E

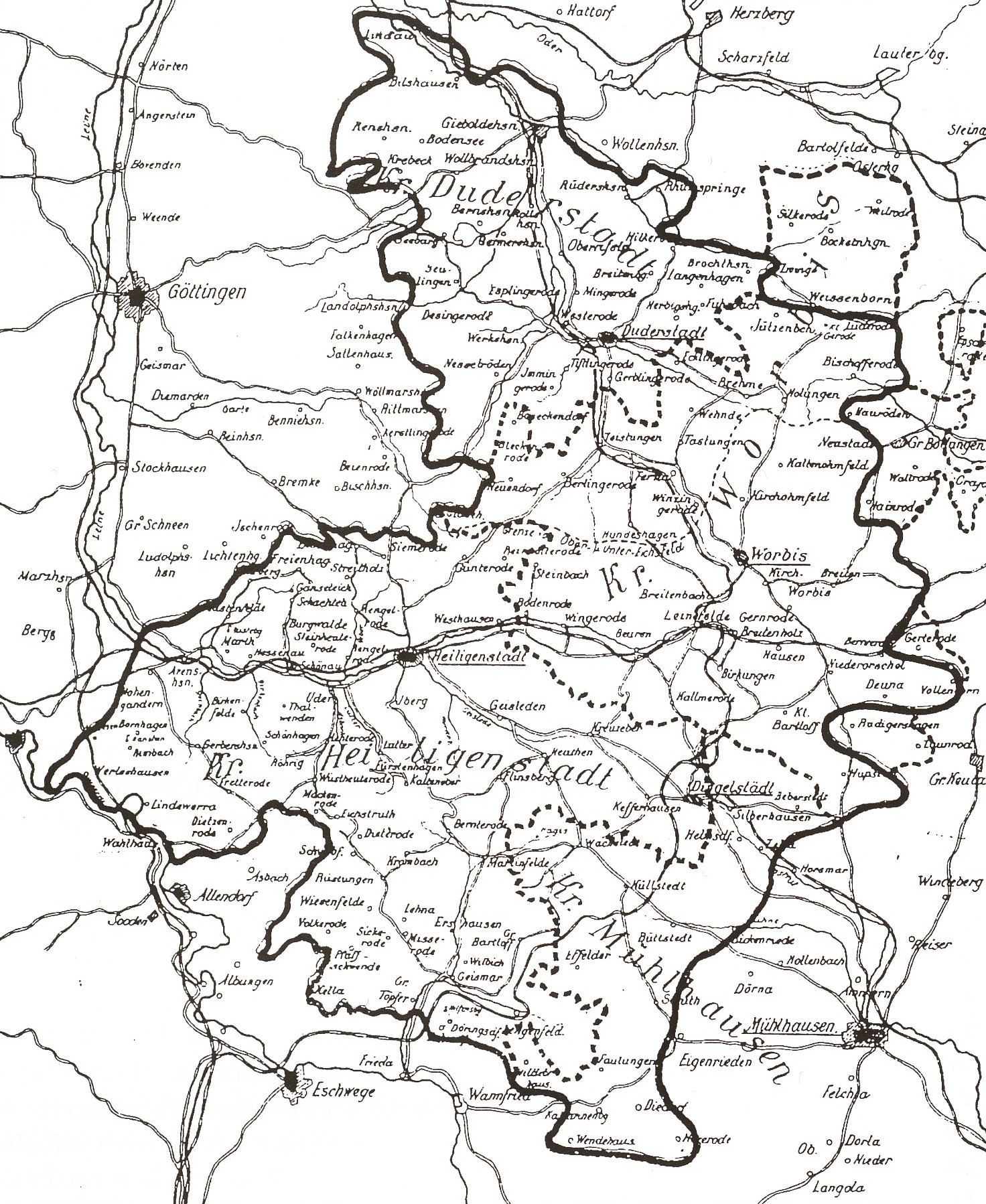
Eichsfeld map from 1900

The Eichsfeld (German: [ˈaɪçsfɛlt] or [ˈaɪksfɛlt]; 'Oak-field') is a historical region in the southeast of the state of Lower Saxony (which is called Untereichsfeld, 'lower Eichsfeld') and northwest of the state of Thuringia (Obereichsfeld, 'upper Eichsfeld') in the south of the Harz mountains in Germany. Until 1803 the Eichsfeld was for centuries part of the Archbishopric of Mainz, which is the cause of its current position as a Catholic enclave in the predominantly Protestant north of Germany. Following German partition in 1945, the West German portion became Landkreis Duderstadt. A few small transfers of territory between the American and Soviet zones of occupation took place in accordance with the Wanfried Agreement.

== Geography ==
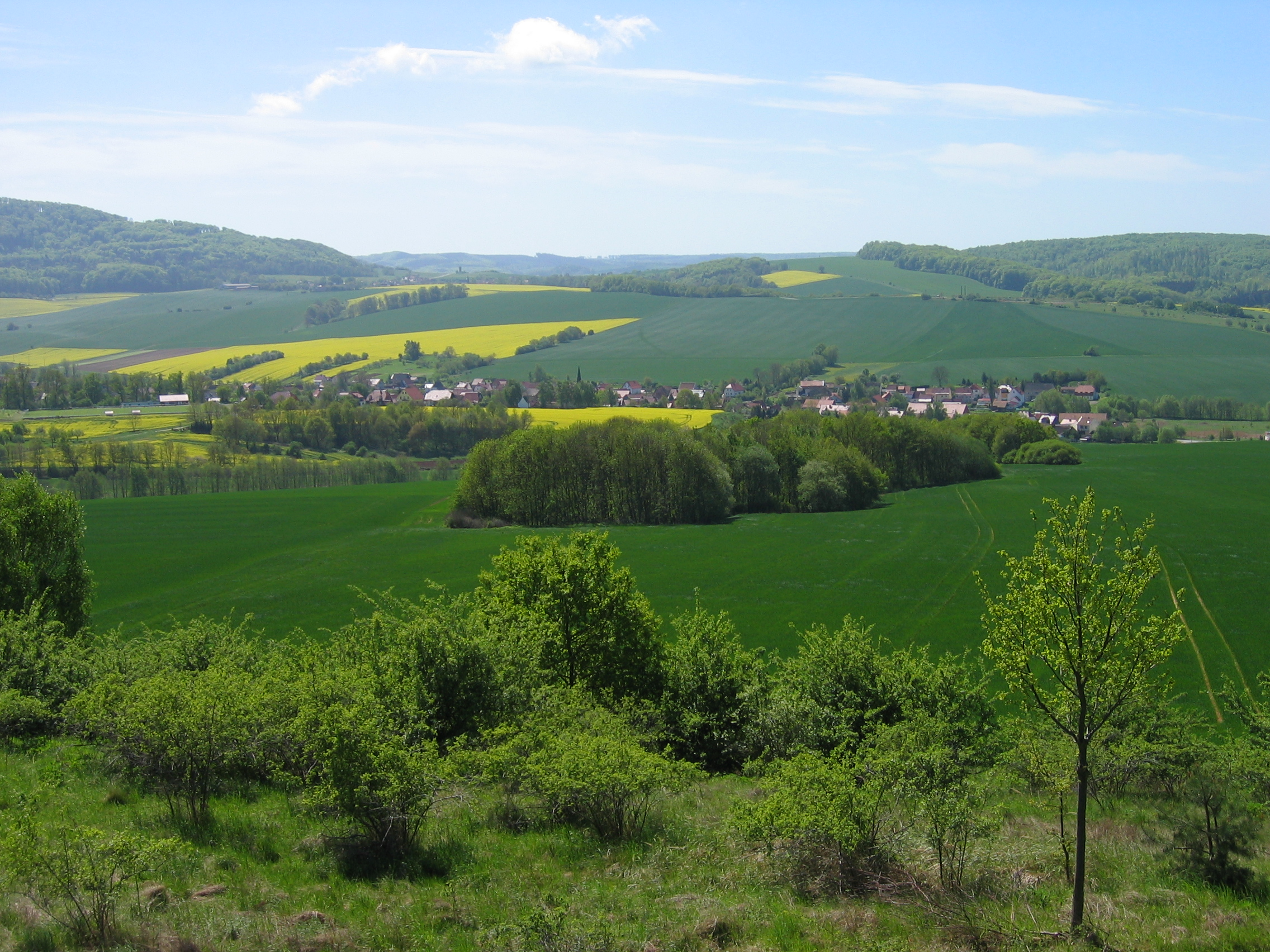
Typical landscape in the Eichsfeld: Villages between fields and wooded hills

Today the greatest part of the Obereichsfeld makes up the Landkreis (district) Eichsfeld. Other parts belong to the district Unstrut-Hainich-Kreis. The Untereichsfeld, later Landkreis Duderstadt, was merged mostly with the Landkreis of Göttingen, while Lindau became part of Katlenburg-Lindau which is now part of the Landkreis of Northeim.

Cities in the Eichsfeld are Duderstadt, Heiligenstadt, Leinefelde-Worbis and Dingelstädt.

== History ==
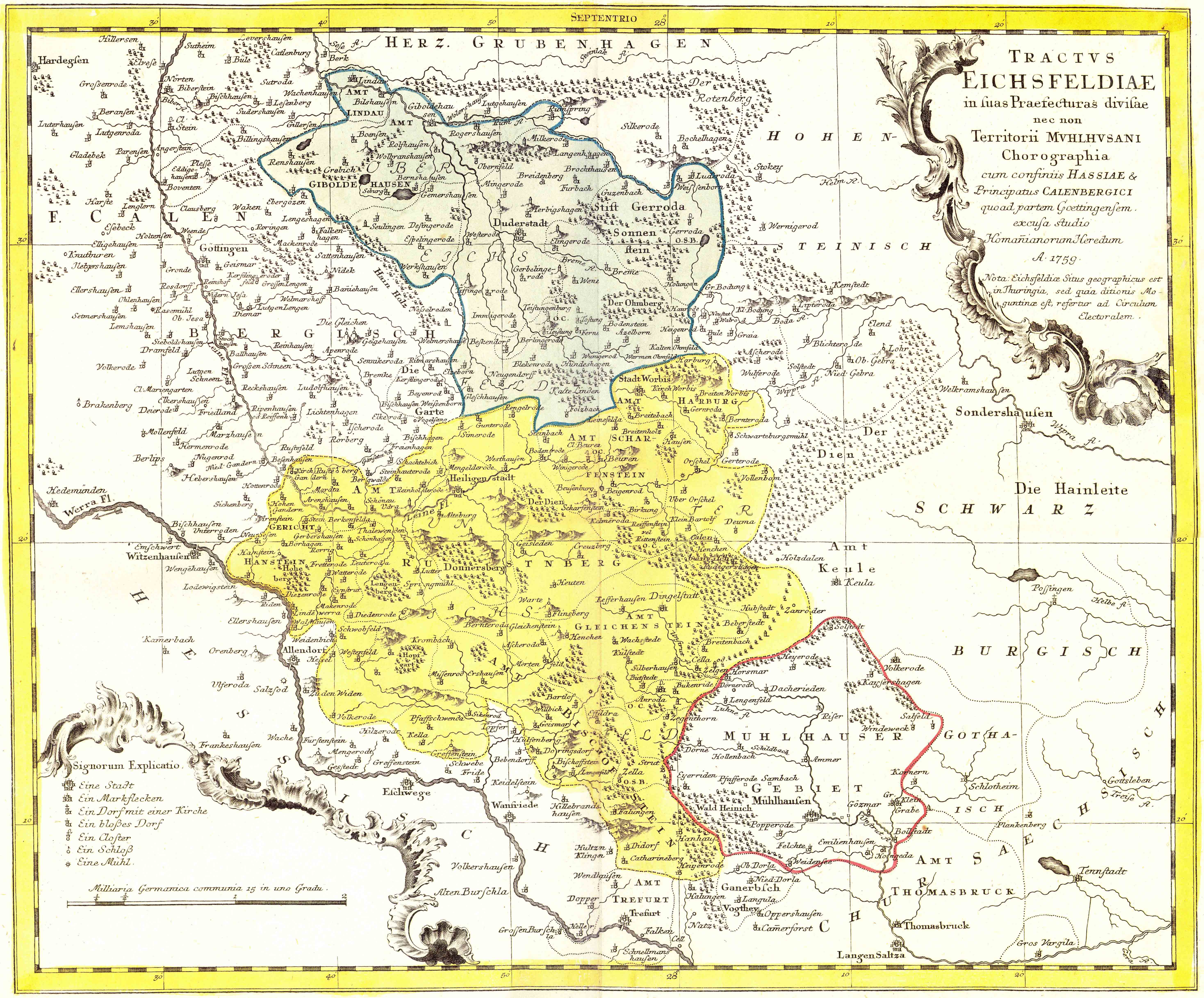
Eichsfeld map from 1759

The Eichsfeld was first mentioned in 897, and in 1022 the Archbishopric of Mainz listed its possessions in the region, which were increased up until 1573. The Ottonian Untereichsfeld became part of Eichsfeld after being part of Brunswick-Lüneburg and Grubenhagen between 1342 and 1434.

During the German Peasants' War within the Reichsstadt of Mühlhausen most of the monasteries, churches and castles were plundered and most of the Eichsfeld became Protestant.

In 1575 the Society of Jesus successfully established the Counter-Reformation in Eichsfeld. The Thirty Years' War reached Eichsfeld in 1622 and during the years following several armies (Swedish, Danish, Thuringian) plundered the region. According to the Peace of Westphalia the Archbishopric of Mainz reestablished Catholicism in the area which was two thirds devastated and had lost 75% of its population.

During the Napoleonic time Eichsfeld was part of the Kingdom of Westphalia, which was dissolved after the victory over Napoleon at the Battle of Leipzig.

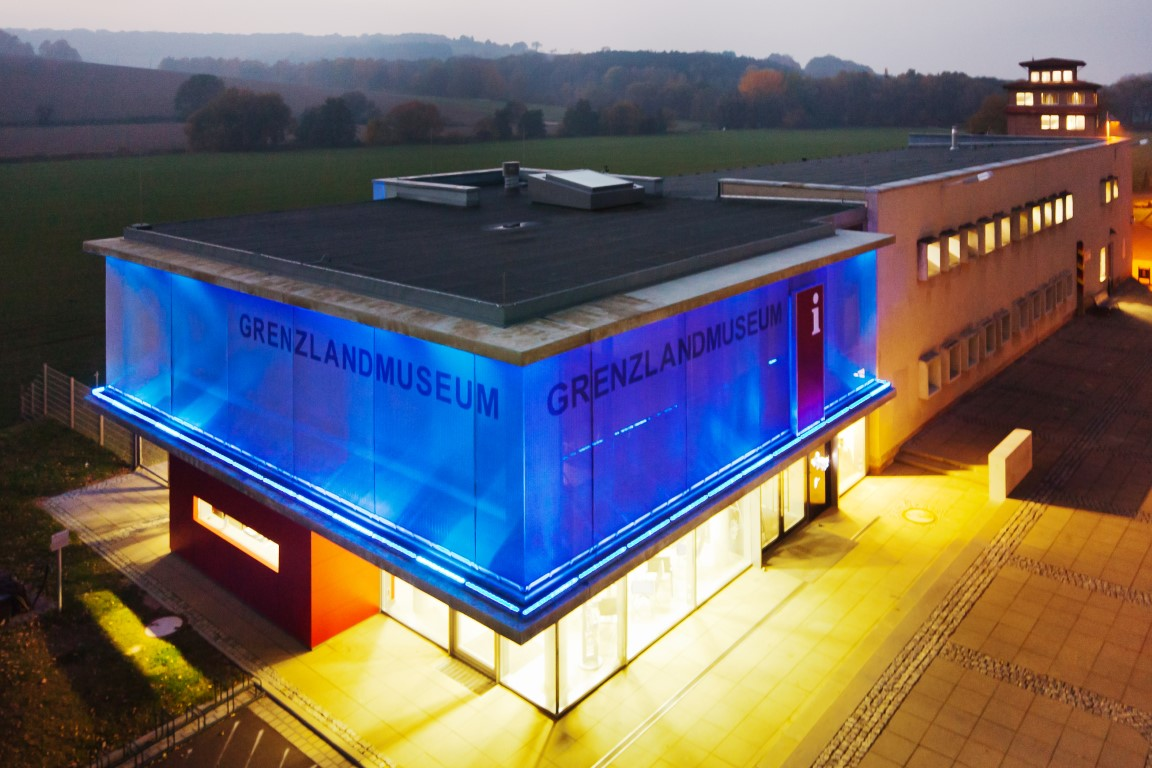
The Borderland Museum Eichsfeld in Teistungen, Thuringia.

From 1949 to 1990 the Obereichsfeld belonged to the GDR. In this atheistic state the people preserved their Catholic roots, and church life stayed relatively intact.

After the fall of the Berlin Wall and the end of the GDR, the Borderland Museum Eichsfeld was opened in the buildings of the former border crossing point Duderstadt-Worbis in the centre of the Eichsfeld region. It addresses the history of the GDR and the German division with focus on its meaning for the Eichsfeld region.

== Politics ==
In consequence of the traditionalism in Eichsfeld, the percentage of voters for the CDU is significantly higher than in the surrounding area.
