= Schindelkopf =

- Location within Lower Saxony

Highest point
- Elevation: 629 m above sea level (NN) (2,064 ft)
- Coordinates: 51.721139°N 10.339583°E

Geography
- Location: Göttingen district Lower Saxony, Germany
- Parent range: Harz Mountains (Upper Harz)

The Schindelkopf (629 m above sea level (NN)) in the Harz Mountains of central Germany is a southwestern outlier of the mountain ridge known as Auf dem Acker (865.1 m). It is located near the town of Osterode am Harz within the unincorporated area of Harz which is in the district of Göttingen in the state of Lower Saxony.

== Location ==
The Schindelkopf lies in the Upper Harz within the Harz Nature Park. It rises between the southwestern end of the main Acker crest in the east and the town of Osterode am Harz in the west. Towards the north-northeast the countryside falls away through the valley of Schachttal to the eastern end of the Söse Reservoir with its pre-basin. To the south-southwest it descends through the valley of the Kleine Steinau, which has its source on the mountains, to the Sieber valley, and, to the west-northwest, it descends along the Eipenke, which also rises on the mountainside, into the valley of the Söse. The Große Schweimke rises a little southwest of the mountain; it is fed by the Kleine Schweimke and is a tributary of the Kleiner Steinau.

== Hiking ==
The Schindelkopf can only be reached on forest tracks. On its northwestern flank stands a Köte (ca. 550 m above NN; 51°43′22.97″N 10°20′10.95″E), which is checkpoint no. 143 in the Harzer Wandernadel hiking system.
