= Ospenke =

River in Germany

Location
- Country: Germany
- State: Lower Saxony

Physical characteristics
- Source
  - location: east of Osterode
  - coordinates: 51°43′23″N 10°18′32″E
  - elevation: ca. 390 m above sea level (NN)
- Mouth
  - location: east of Osterode into the Söse
  - coordinates: 51°43′47″N 10°17′32″E
  - elevation: ca. 260 m above sea level (NN)
- Length: 1.5 km (0.93 mi)

Basin features
- Progression: Söse→ Rhume→ Leine→ Aller→ Weser→ North Sea

The Ospenke is a left tributary of the Söse near Osterode in the Harz Mountains of central Germany in the state of Lower Saxony.

== Course ==
The Ospenke rises between the valleys of the Apenke and Eipenke, runs parallel to the latter and empties from the left into the Söse in the suburb of Scheerenberg.

== See also ==
- List of rivers of Lower Saxony
