= Alte Burg (Osterode) =

Ruined castle in Lower Saxony, Germany

- Osterode am Harz
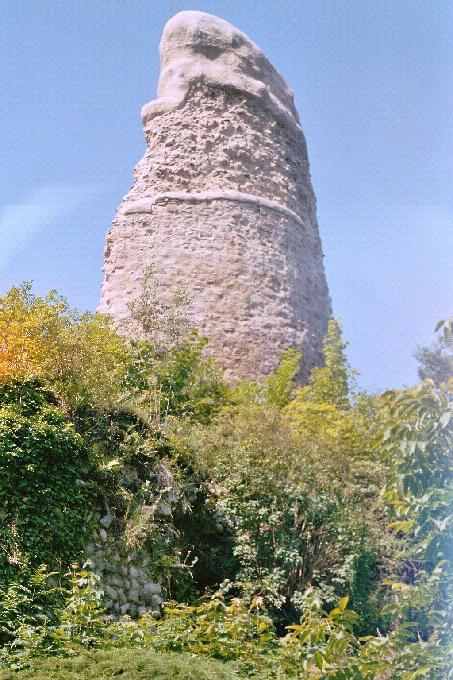
- Fragment of the tower of the "Alte Burg" in Osterode/Harz

Site information
- Type: hill castle
- Code: DE-NI
- Condition: ruin

Location
- Coordinates: 51°43′48″N 10°15′26″E

The Alte Burg is a ruined spur castle that only comprises half a bergfried and is located in the Lower Saxon district of Osterode in the Harz Mountains of central Germany. The name means "Old Castle".

== Location ==
The ruins stand on a hill spur between the valleys of the rivers Söse and Lerbach. Today the ruins find themselves within a cemetery. The castle ruins cannot actually be visited even though access through the cemetery is possible.

== Site ==
Of the old castle on a site measuring 40 x 60 metres, only a small part of the bergfried has survived. The greater part of the castle was used as a quarry and much of the stone was carried away. The remaining tower ruins were extensively repaired. Originally the round bergfried was 33 metres high and had an outside diameter of 15 metres. Its walls were up to 3.5 metres thick and it had 5 stories.

== History ==
The castle was first recorded in 1153. It belonged in the 12th century to Henry the Lion. After his death, his son, Otto IV inherited it. Later he bequeathed it to Otto the Child. Other owners were Albert the Tall and Henry the Admirable. In the 14th and 15th centuries the castle became the seat of the dukes of Grubenhagen and was used as a dowager seat for the family. It was last lived in by Duchess Elisabeth who died in 1513. After that it fell into ruins.

== Sources ==
- Ernst Andreas Friedrich: Wenn Steine reden könnten. Band IV, Landbuch-Verlag, Hanover, 1998, ISBN 3-7842-0558-5
