= Teufelsloch (Teufelsbäder) =

Coordinates: 51.705026°N 10.290327°E

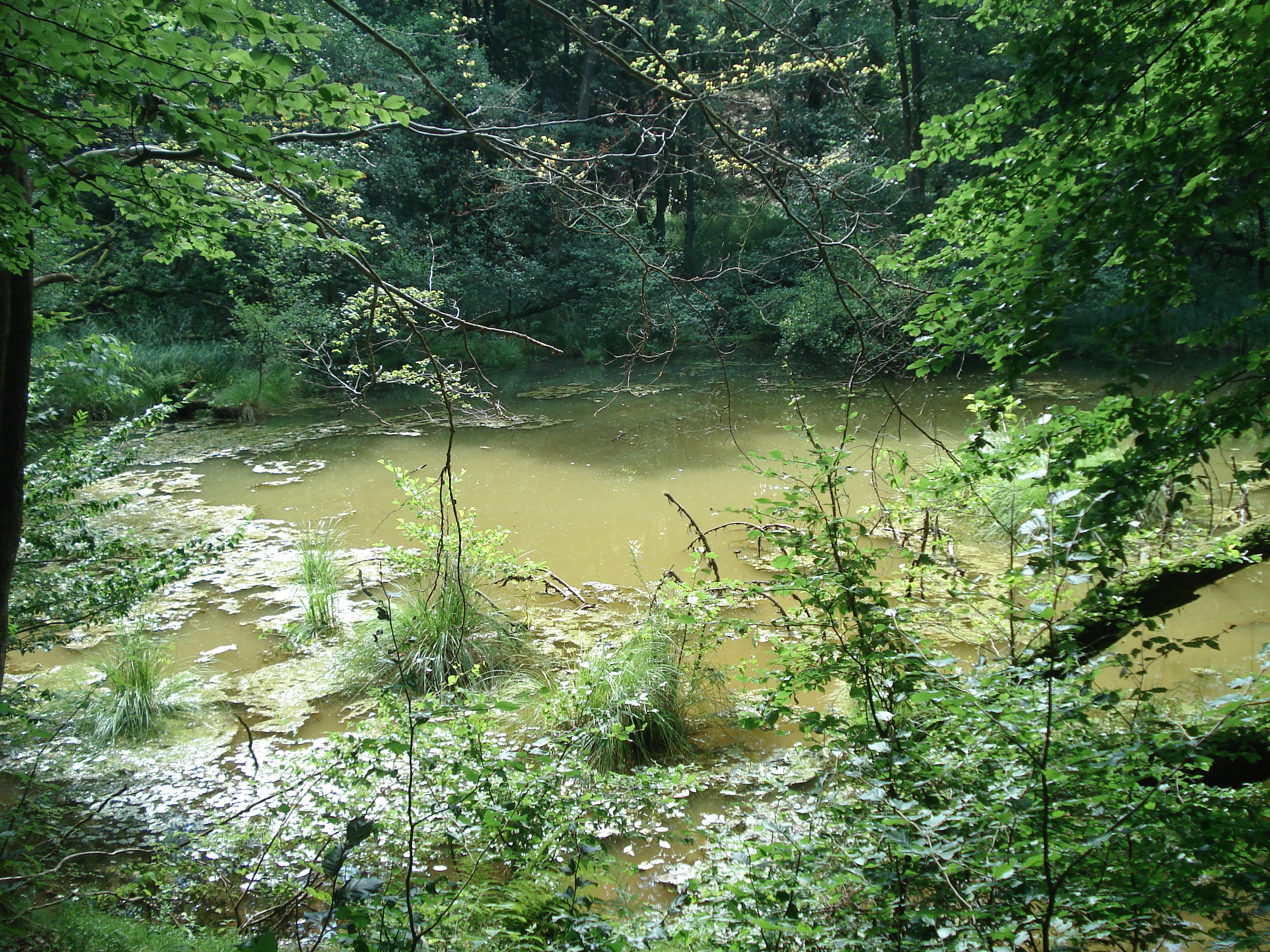
The Teufelsloch

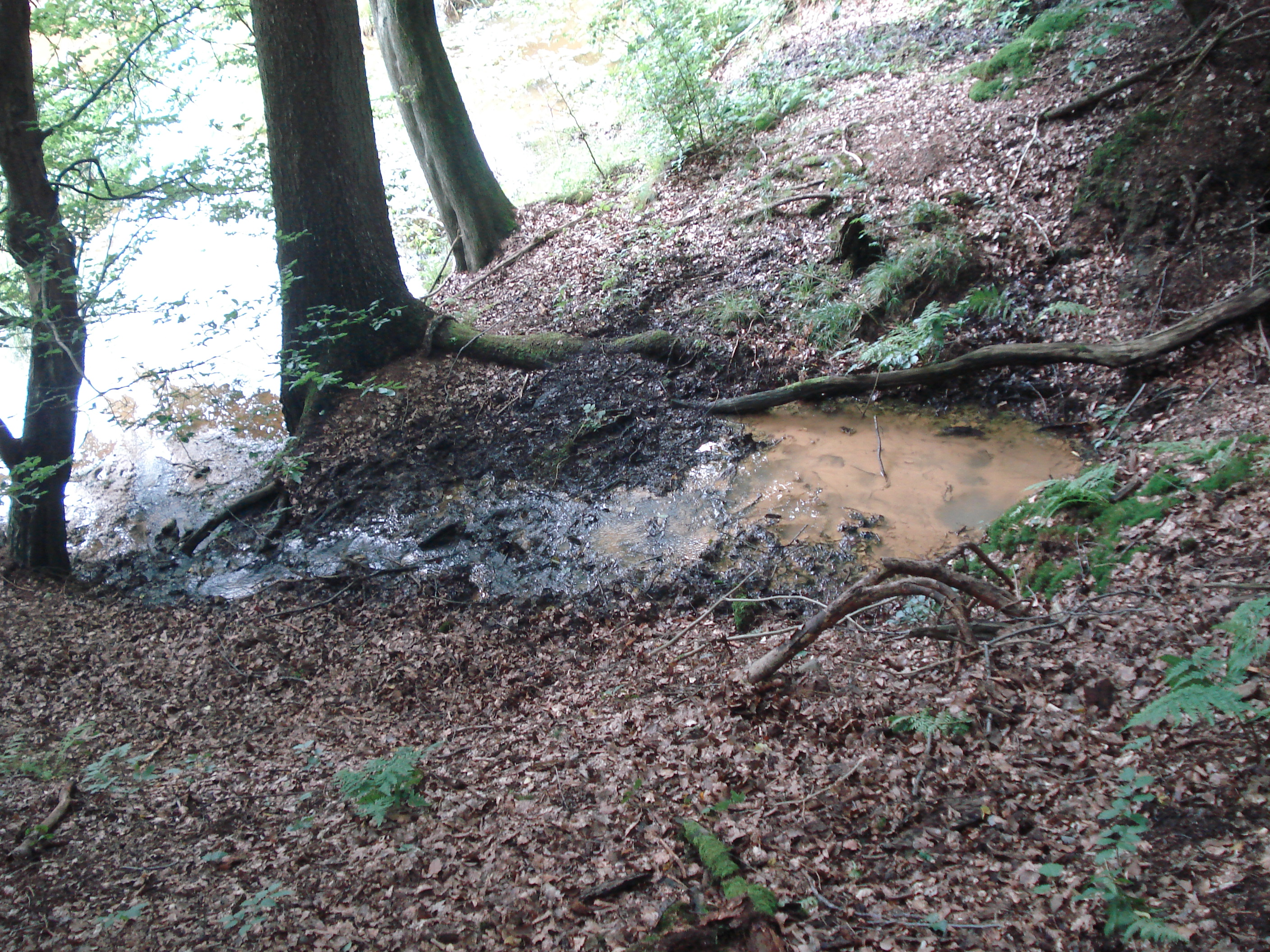
Sporadically flowing spring on the shore/bank of the Teufelsloch

The Teufelsloch ("Devil's Hole") is a karst spring near Osterode am Harz in the German state of Lower Saxony.

== Description ==
The Teufelsloch is located southeast of Augustental in mature forest near the Karst Trail. It is a circular sinkhole with lustrous blue-green water. The stream that drains it feeds the Teufelsbäder moor to the west, and then flows through the Apenke to the river Söse. After heavy rain, other springs rise in the area around its banks that give the karst water in the Teufelsloch a brownish colour. The Teufelsloch lies within the Nature Reserve.

== Folk stories ==
In earlier times, the Teufelsloch was perceived as something rather threatening. The origin of its shimmering blue waters rising from eerie depths could not be explained by the people. They talked of will-o'-the-wisps of human size, who would lure wanderers at night over a bent tree into the Teufelsloch. Others believed that the devil in the form of a giant one-eyed fish with a needle-sharp bite, lurked in the water.
