= Charcoal burner =

Occupation of manufacturing charcoal

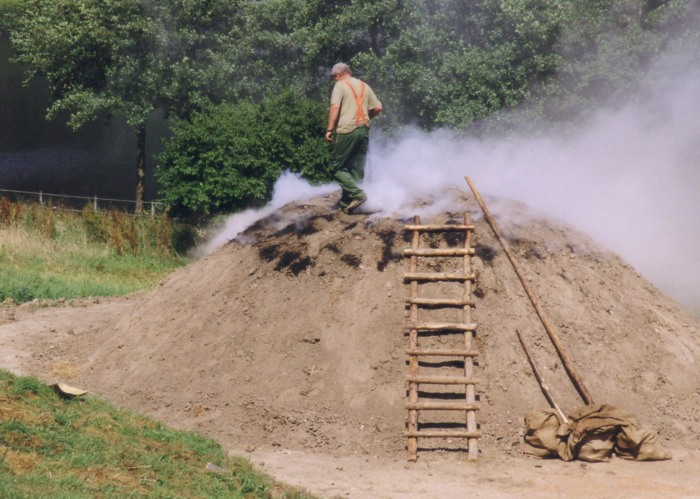
A charcoal burner at his charcoal pile

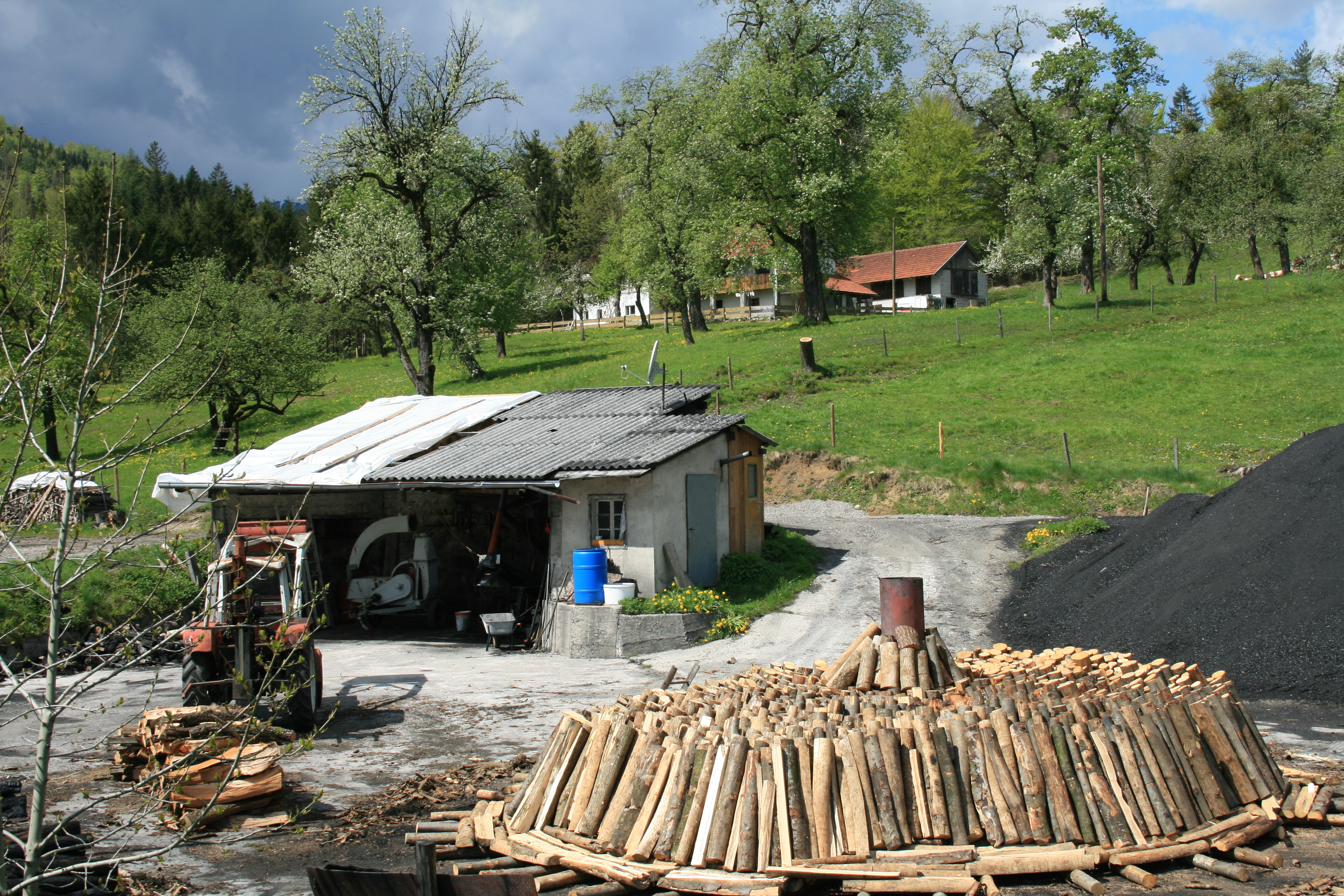
Charcoal burning in Grünburg near the River Steyr water gap

A charcoal burner is someone whose occupation is to manufacture charcoal. Traditionally this is achieved by carbonising wood in a charcoal pile or kiln. Charcoal burning is one of the oldest human crafts.

== History and technique ==
=== Medieval charcoal burners ===
Since the Iron Age, high temperatures have had to be produced for iron smelting, for glassmaking, and for the working of precious metals. Charcoal has been used to do this for centuries and, in order to produce it, entire forests were felled. With the increasing use of stone coal from the 18th century, the charcoal burning industry declined.

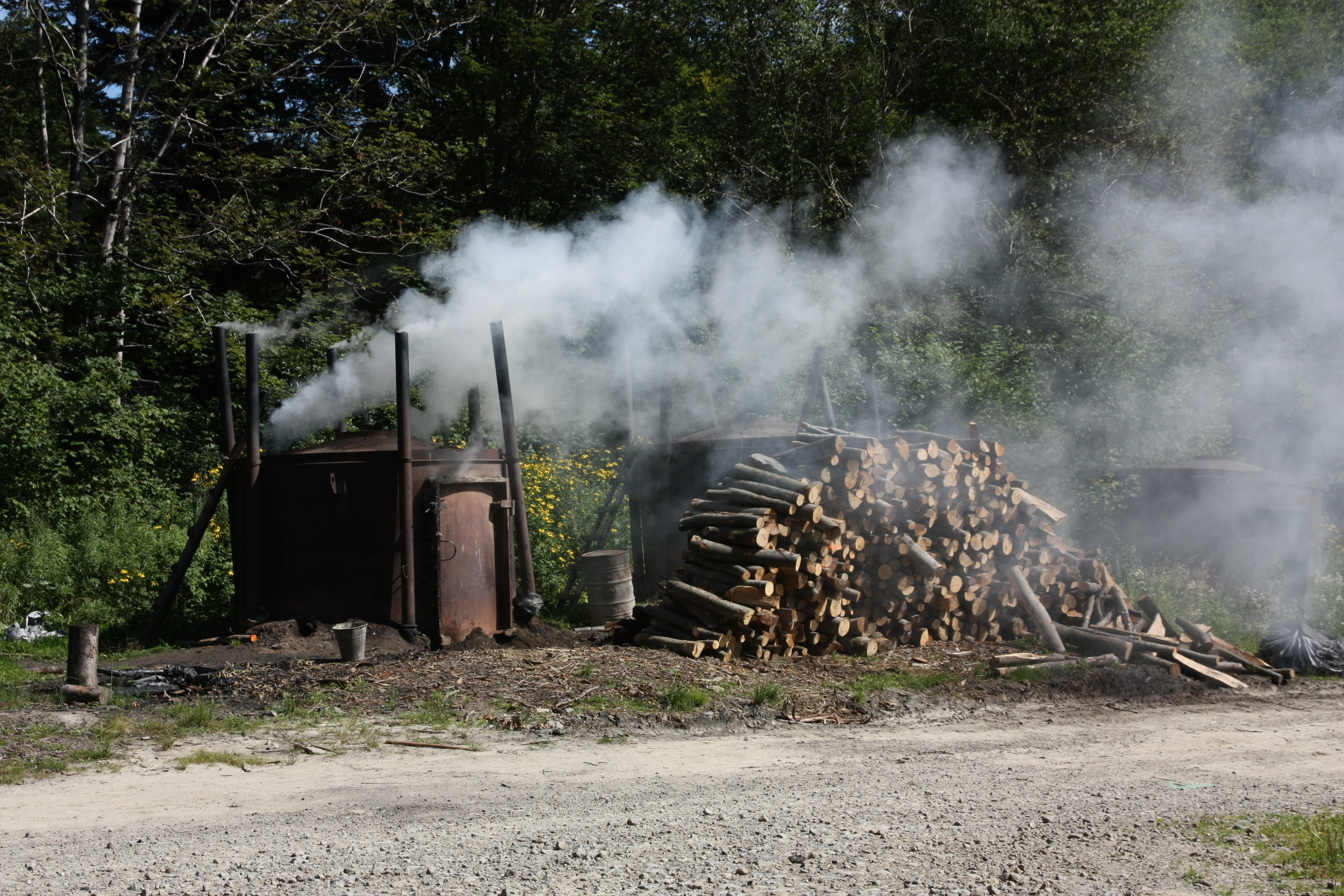
Charcoal burning in modern iron retorts, Otryt, Poland

Even in ancient times, charcoal was manufactured in kilns. Logs were arranged in a conical heap (a charcoal kiln or pile) around posts, a fire shaft was made using brushwood and wood chips and covered with an airtight layer of grass, moss and earth. The pile was ignited inside the firing shaft and, at a temperature of between 300 and 350 °C, the carbonization process began. The process took six to eight days - in large kilns several weeks - during which time the charcoal burner had to control the draught (by piercing small holes and resealing them), being careful neither to allow the pile to go out nor let it go up in flames. By observing the smoke exiting the kiln, the charcoal burner could assess the state of the carbonization process. If the smoke was thick and gray, the wood was still raw; thin, blue smoke indicated good carbonization.

In earlier times, charcoal burners led an austere, lonely life. They had to live near the kiln, usually in a charcoal burner's hut (Köhlerhütte or Köte in Germany, Austria and Switzerland). During the Middle Ages, charcoal burners were ostracised. Their profession was considered dishonourable and they were frequently accused of evil practices. Even today there is a certain denigration of this former occupation. In the German language to have a charcoal burner's faith (Köhlerglauben) is to have blind faith in something. That aside, the continuing requirement to keep the kiln at the right temperature in all weathers meant that the job must have been arduous, lonely and, at times, dangerous.

=== Modern ===
Charcoal burning is still carried out commercially in parts of the world. It is rare in Europe, but still practised in Romania, Poland, the UK, Slovenia, and Switzerland. Other places where it is still common are the tropical rain forests of South America and Africa.

Even in the 20th century, charcoal burners in remote areas like the Harz Mountains and the Thuringian Forest, still used a illebille, a large contraption of beechwood boards, used as alarm and signal device. This is commemorated in the name of a mountain ridge in the Harz, called Hillebille. Today the tradition of this old craft is mainly preserved in clubs and societies. These include the European Charcoal Burners' Society (Europäische Köhlerverein) and the Glasofen Charcoal Burners' Society (Köhlerverein Glasofen). In 2014, charcoal burning and tar distilling were incorporated into the register of the Intangible Cultural Heritage in Germany by the Kultusministerkonferenz.

== In popular culture ==
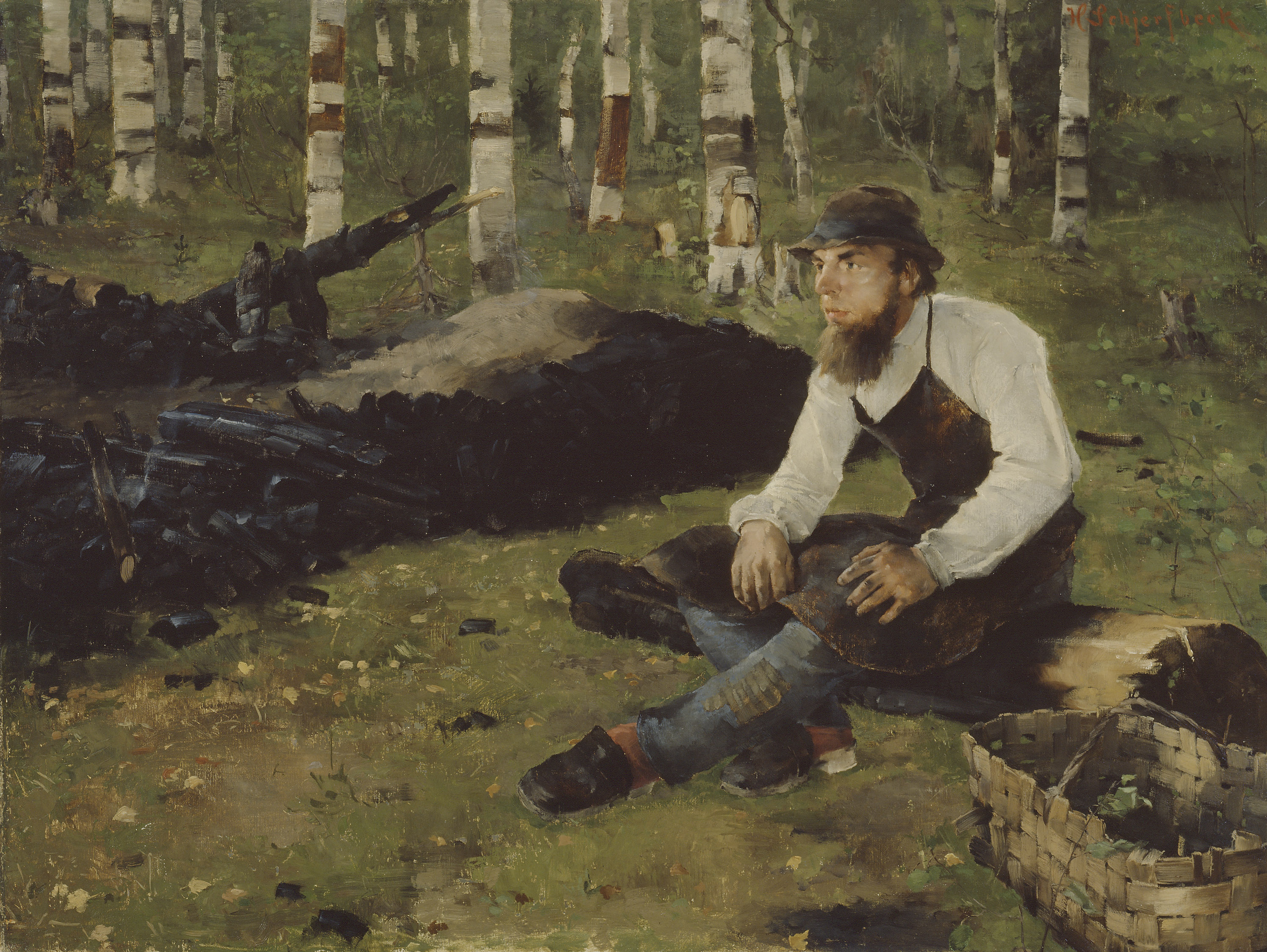
Charcoal Burner by Helene Schjerfbeck, 1882

Saint Alexander of Comana (died c. 251) is known as "the charcoal burner". He is said to have taken up the job of charcoal burner to avoid worldly acclaim.

A. A. Milne's poem "The Charcoal Burner" appeared in Now We Are Six, a collection of verse. It begins:

The Charcoal Burner has tales to tell.
He lives in the forest,
alone in the forest;
he sits in the forest,
alone in the forest.
And the sun comes slanting between the trees

In Swedish children's author Maria Gripe's Hugo and Josephine trilogy (the middle book of which was made into the film Hugo and Josephine in 1967), the character Hugo's father is a charcoal burner. Both father and son are portrayed as independent, unmaterialistic people with forest craft skills. When Hugo is first introduced, his father the charcoal burner is in prison for assault, something Hugo attributes to him trying to live in a town instead of alone in the forest.

A father and son pair of charcoal burners in 1930s England, both named Billy, are recurring characters in the Swallows and Amazons series of children's books by Arthur Ransome.

The family of the protagonist siblings of the manga and anime Demon Slayer, Kamado Tanjirō and Kamado Nezuko, are charcoal burners; their surname, Kamado, refers to a Japanese charcoal stove. A significant part of their characterization comes from the fact they grew up in a forested mountain near a small town, cutting and burning wood.

Charcoal burners and charcoal-burning camps appear in the video games Kingdom Come: Deliverance and Kingdom Come: Deliverance II, which depict everyday life in medieval Bohemia.

== See also ==
- Biochar

== Bibliography ==
- Armstrong, Lyn (1978). Woodcolliers and Charcoal Burning. Horsham/Singleton: Coach Publishing House/Weald and Downland Open Air Museum. ISBN 0-905259-05-X.
- Dietrich, Vincenz (1847). Das Ganze der Verkohlung in stehenden Meilern oder die sogenannte italienische Köhlerei, nach den 30jährigen praktischen Erfahrungen und Betriebsresultaten zu Hieflau und Obersteiermark bearbeitet. Graz: Kienrich.
- Hasel, Karl; Schwartz, Ekkehard (2002). Forstgeschichte: Ein Grundriss für Studium und Praxis (2nd ed.). Remagen: Kessel. ISBN 3-935638-26-4.
- Kelley, D. W. (1986). Charcoal and Charcoal Burning. Shire Album. Vol. 159. Aylesbury: Shire Publications. ISBN 0-85263-731-4.
- Strauch, Thomas (2007). "Von Köhlern, Rußbrennern und Harzsammlern: Historische Waldberufe rund um die Holzverwertung". Jahrbuch zum Bergmannskalender. Deutsche Steinkohle: 173–80.
