= Lerbach =

Lerbach may refer to:

- Lerbach, Osterode am Harz, a village of Osterode am Harz in Lower Saxony, Germany
- Lerbach (Söse), a river of Lower Saxony, Germany, tributary of the Söse
