= Teufelsbäder =

Coordinates: 51.708503°N 10.278686°E

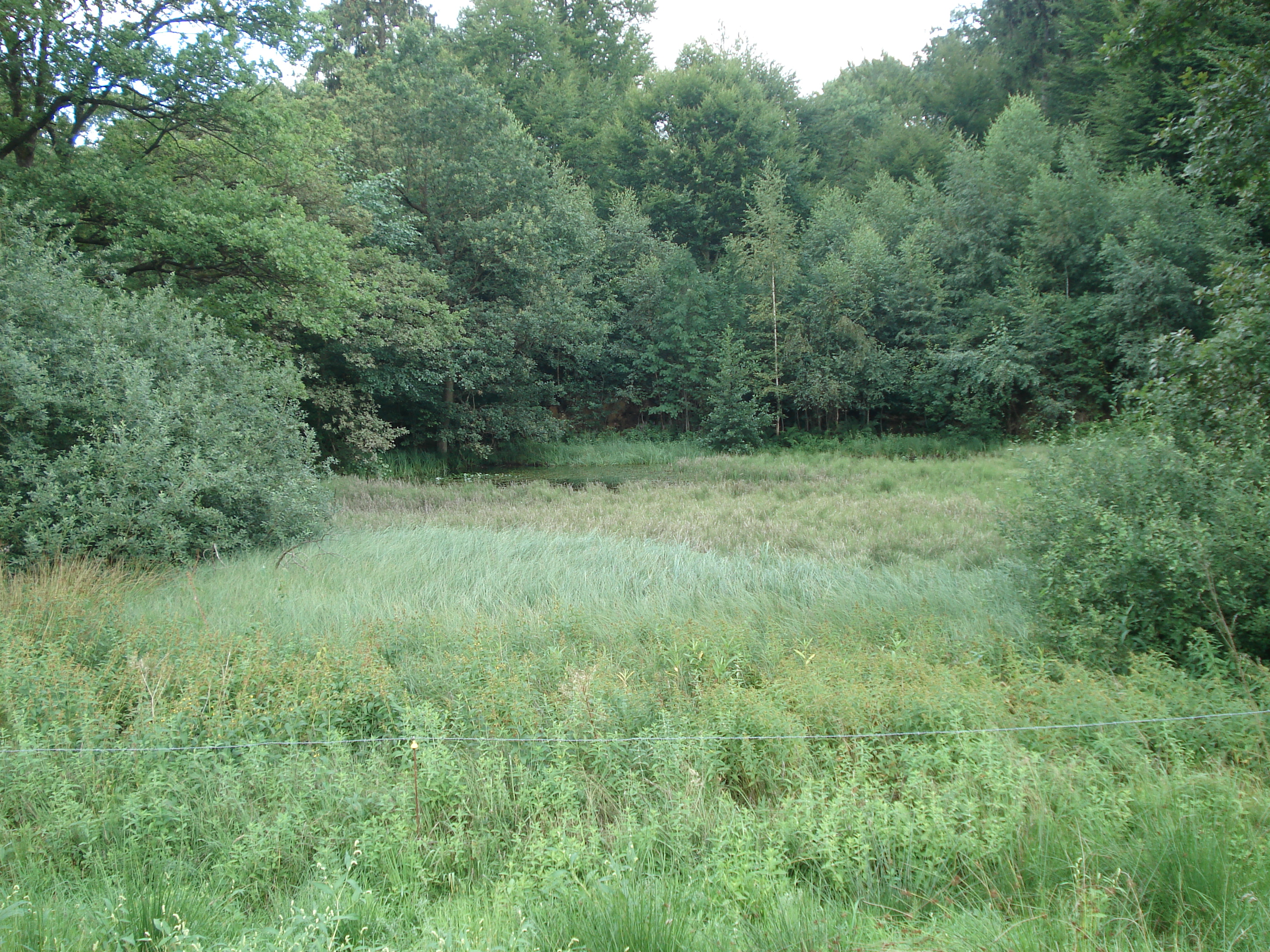
In the Teufelsbäder Nature Reserve

The Teufelsbäder ("Devil's Baths") is the name of a moor landscape near Osterode am Harz in the Harz Mountains of central Germany. It lies within the nature reserve of the same name southeast of Augustental on the B 243 federal road.

== Description ==
The ponds and marshy depressions in the nature reserve, which covers an area of roughly 84 hectares (210 acres), are fed by the Teufelsloch, a karst spring in the highland forest. They are the remains of an intensive deposition of Werra anhydrites and a representative part of the gypsum karst landscape of the South Harz. The Großes and Kleines Teufelsbad ("Large and Small Devil's Bath") were formed by embankments and have become silted up fishing ponds. Their runoff empties into the Apenke stream after flowing for just a few metres.

in 1980 the Lower Saxon State Office of Soil Science drilled 145 metres into the karst cavities below the anhydrite. In the hole, a steel pipe was installed from which about 1.5 litres of karst water flowed per second. With the help of contrast water testing unsuccessful attempts were made to determine the origin of the water.

The area, which has been a nature reserve since 1984, is a habitat for rare plant species and a breeding ground for numerous birds typical of such features. Walkers are not permitted to leave the Karst Trail that runs past the Teufelsbäder.
