= Köte =

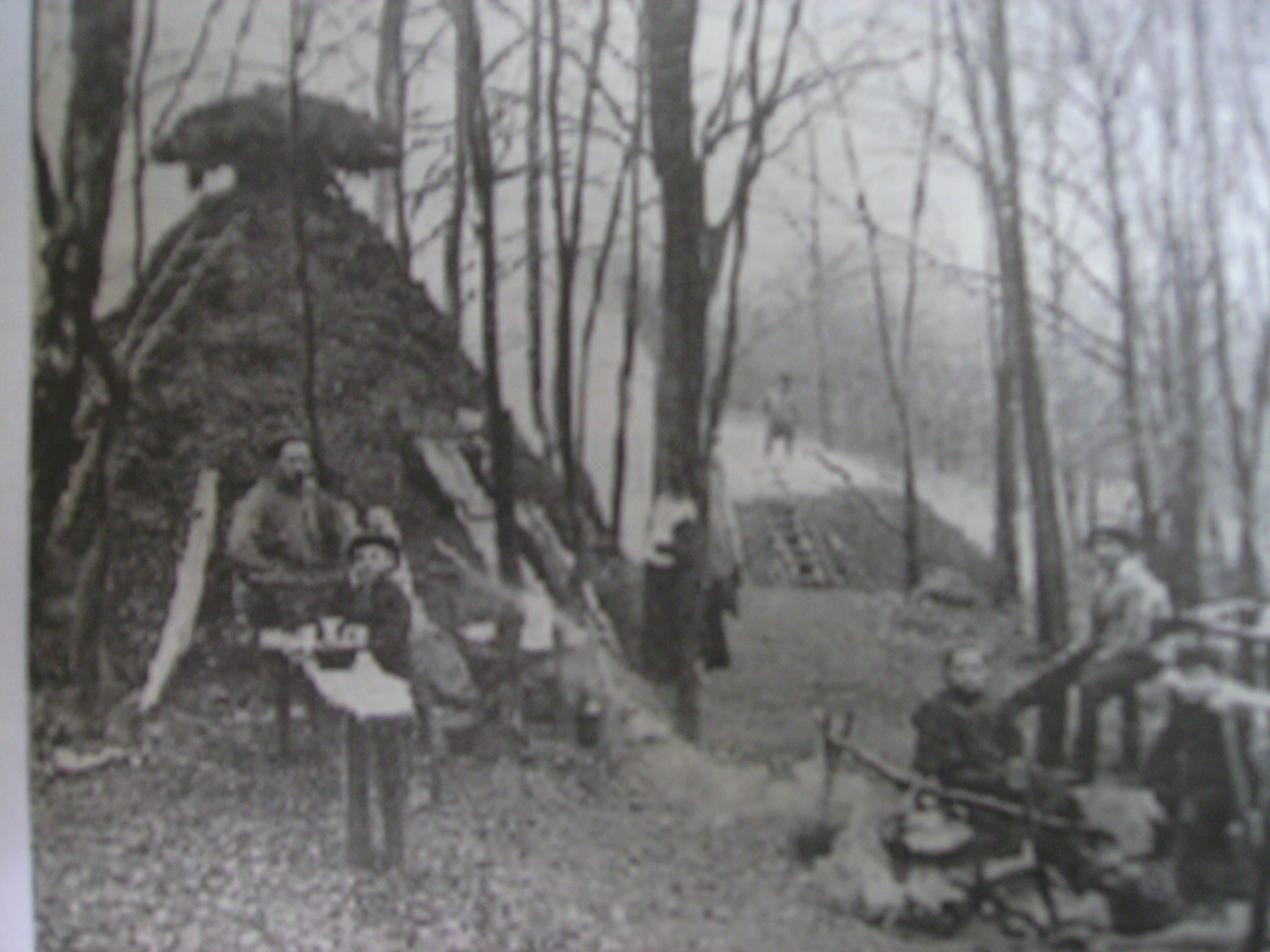
A Köte and Kohlenmeiler with charcoal burners at their work (turn of the 19th/20th century)

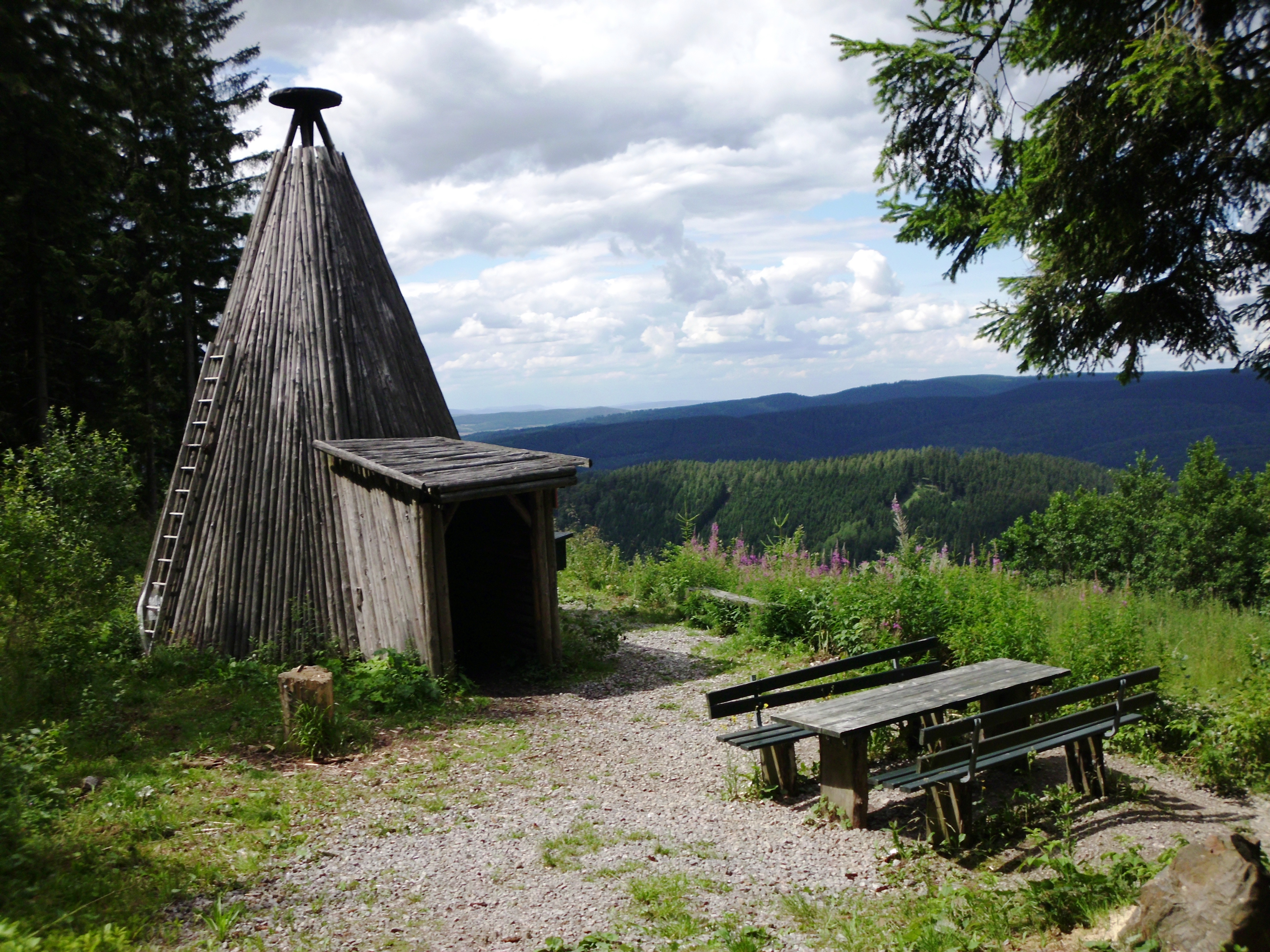
A Köte and rest area on the Schindelkopf

A Köte (also Köthe) is the term used in the Harz Mountains of central Germany for a charcoal burner's hut (Köhlerhütte). A Köte was occupied by a charcoal burner in order to look after a nearby wood pile (Kohlenmeiler). The charcoal burner prepared the necessary charcoal for the smelting of ores.

Today, Köten are used for tourism purposes as shelters and rest stops for hikers.

== Examples ==
There are replicas of Köten in the Harz, for example at these places:

- Köte am Heidenstieg (51°50′26.7″N 10°25′24.3″E), in the Schulenberg Forest northwest of and above Schulenberg im Oberharz between the Großer (645.4 m) and Kleiner Wiesenberg (512.5 m above sea level (NHN)) at about 521 m on the Heidenstieg; as No. 124 in the system of checkpoints in the Harzer Wandernadel hiking network
- Köte am Schindelkopf (51°43′23″N 10°20′11″E), in the Osterode Municipal Forest east of Osterode am Harz on the northwestern slopes of the Schindelkopf (ca. 629 m above sea level (NHN)) at about 570 m on the Nassen Weg; as No. 143 in the system of checkpoints of the Harzer Wandernadel

== Gallery ==
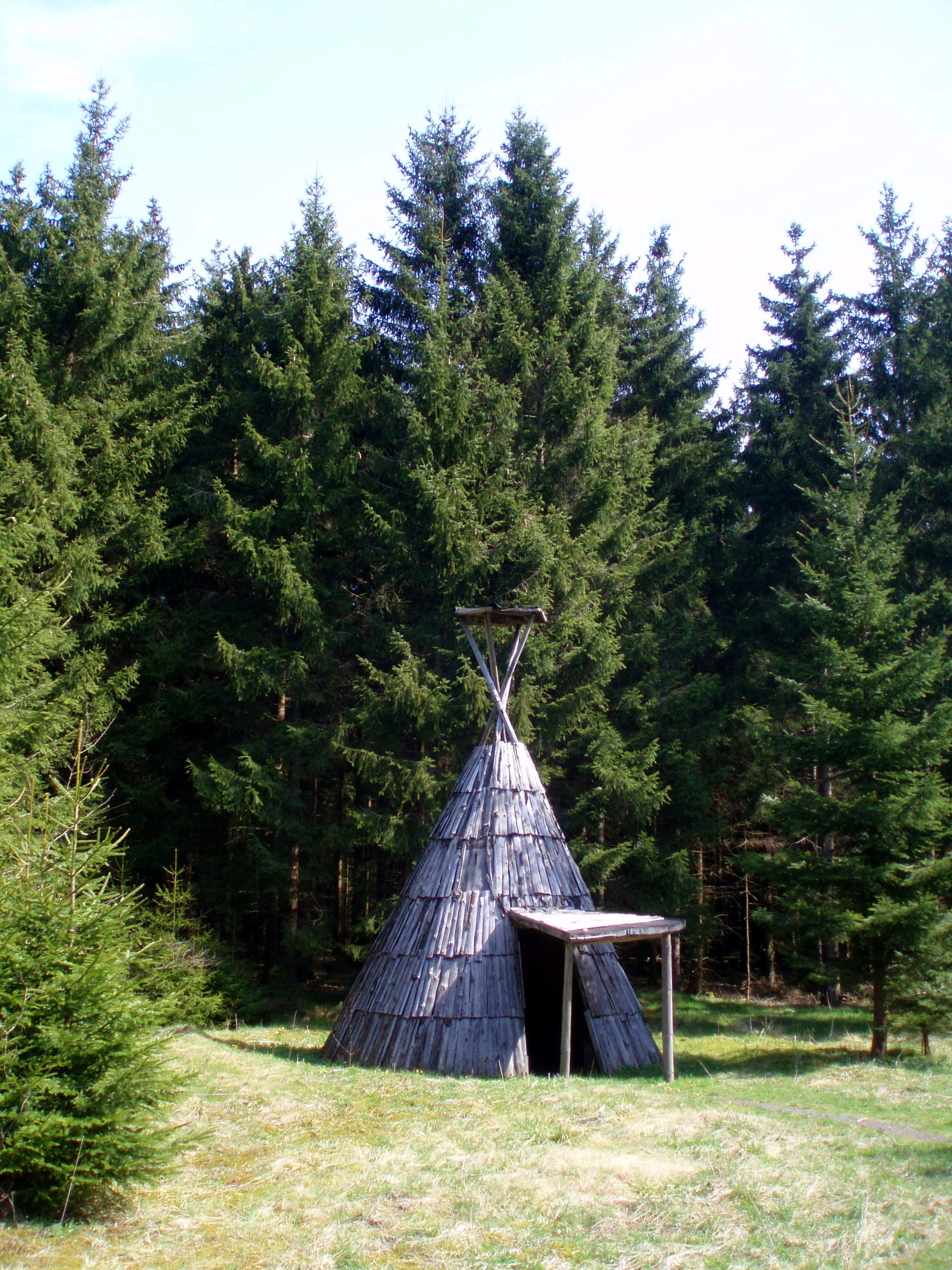
Typical Köte in the Harz

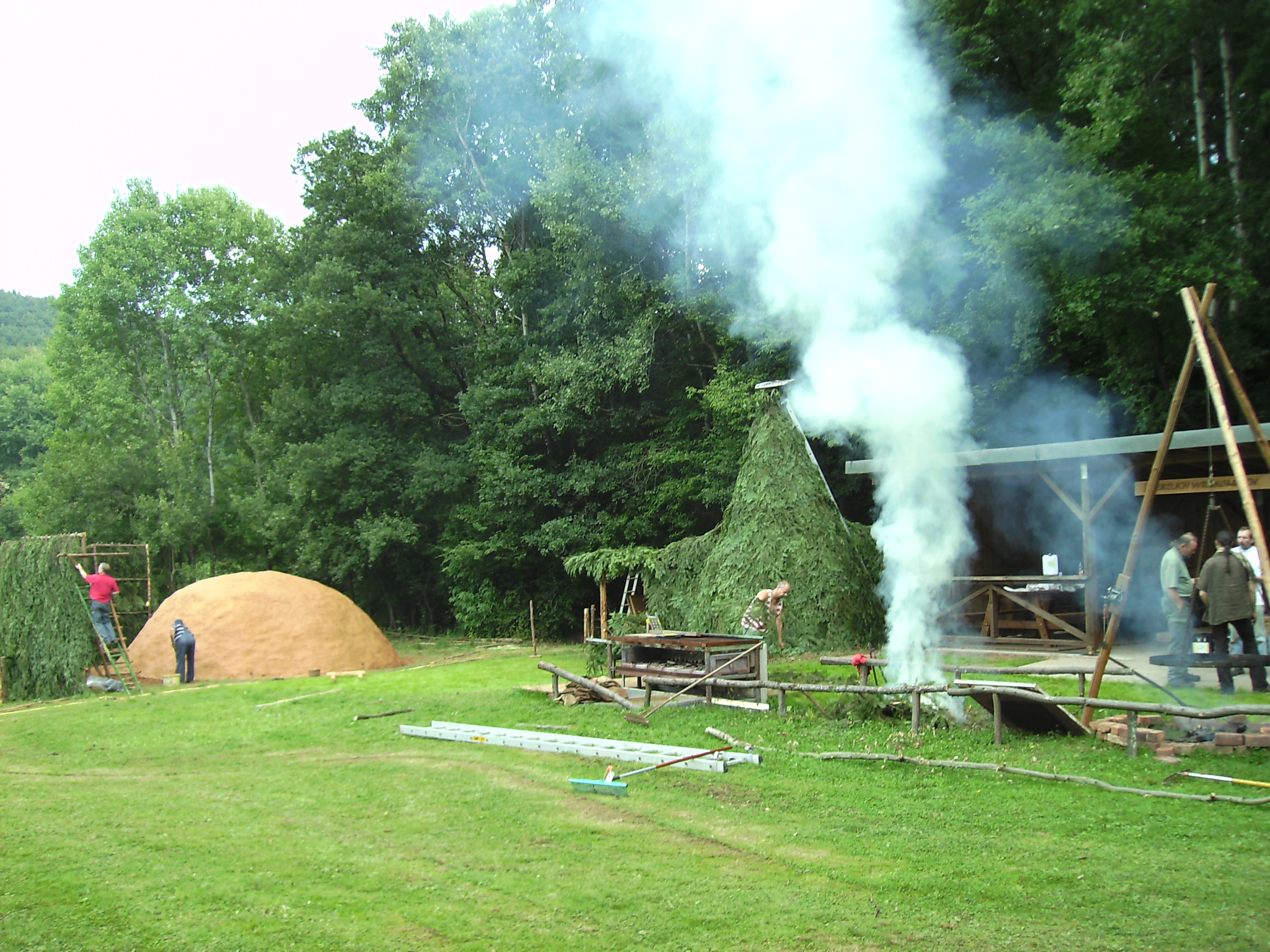
Completed Meiler with wind break, charcoal hut and fireplace
