= Teufelsloch =

Teufelsloch may refer to:

- Teufelsloch (Teufelsbäder), a sinkhole with a karst spring in the Harz Mountains of Germany near Osterode am Harz, Lower Saxony
- Teufelsloch (doline), a doline in the southern Black Forest in Germany near Rheinfelden, Baden-Württemberg.
- Teufelsloch (ravine), a ravine in the Swabian Jura near Bad Boll, Baden-Württemberg
- Teufelsloch (Lattengebirge), the natural rock arch in the Lattengebirge near Berchtesgaden, Bavaria
- The Teufelshöhle (Pottenstein), near Pottenstein, Bavaria, Germany
- The Teufelshöhle (Steinau), near Steinau, Hesse, Germany
- Průrva Ploučnice, the artificial, underground river course in Bohemia, Czech Republic
- Devil's Hole, the underground water reservoir in Nevada, USA
