= Kleine Schweimke =

River in Germany

Location
- Country: Germany
- States: Lower Saxony

Physical characteristics
- Source
  - elevation: 572 m (1,877 ft)
- Mouth
  - location: Große Schweimke
  - coordinates: 51°42′8″N 10°18′26″E
  - elevation: 315 m (1,033 ft)
- Length: 2 km (1.2 mi)

Basin features
- Progression: Große Schweimke→ Kleine Steinau→ Sieber→ Oder→ Rhume→ Leine→ Aller→ Weser→ North Sea

Kleine Schweimke is a small river of Lower Saxony, Germany. It flows into the Große Schweimke southeast of Osterode am Harz.

== See also ==
- List of rivers of Lower Saxony
