= George William Alberti =

George William Alberti (1723 – 3 September 1758) was a German essayist and theologian, who spent many years in England.

== Biography ==
He was born at Osterode am Harz in 1723, and studied philosophy and theology under Heumann and Oporin at Göttingen, where he graduated in 1745. He spent some years in England. He became minister of Tundern in Hanover, and died there on 3 September 1758.

== Works ==
He published:

- Diss. de Pseudothaumaturgis Pharaonis, 1744
- De Imputabilitate Somni (graduation thesis), 1745
- Some Thoughts on the Essay on Natural Religion, 1747
- Aufr. Nachricht von der Rel. . . . der Quäker, 1750
- Briefe betreffend den allerneuesten Zustand der Rel. und der Wissenschaften in Gross-Britannien, 1752–4
