= Nico Lauenstein =

German footballer

Personal information
- Full name: Nico Lauenstein
- Date of birth: 12 January 1986 (age 40)
- Place of birth: Osterode, West Germany
- Height: 1.85 m (6 ft 1 in)
- Position: Goalkeeper

Team information
- Current team: Grün-Weiß Amisia

Youth career
- SV Scharzfeld
- VfR Osterode
- –2004: Hertha BSC

Senior career*
Years	Team	Apps	(Gls)
2004–2009	Eintracht Braunschweig II	106	(0)
2008–2009	Eintracht Braunschweig	2	(0)
2009–2013	Goslarer SC	119	(0)
2013–2016	MTV Wolfenbüttel	43	(0)
2017–2020	SV Rot-Weiß Hörden	15	(0)
2020–	Grün-Weiß Amisia		
- * Club domestic league appearances and goals as of 05:59, 13 January 2019 (UTC)

Nico Lauenstein (born 12 January 1986) is a German footballer who plays as a goalkeeper for Grün-Weiß Amisia Rheine.

== Career ==
Lauenstein made his professional debut for Eintracht Braunschweig in the 3. Liga on 4 March 2009, coming on as a substitute in the 68th minute for Jasmin Fejzić in the 1–2 away loss against Rot-Weiß Erfurt.
