= Apenke =

River in Germany

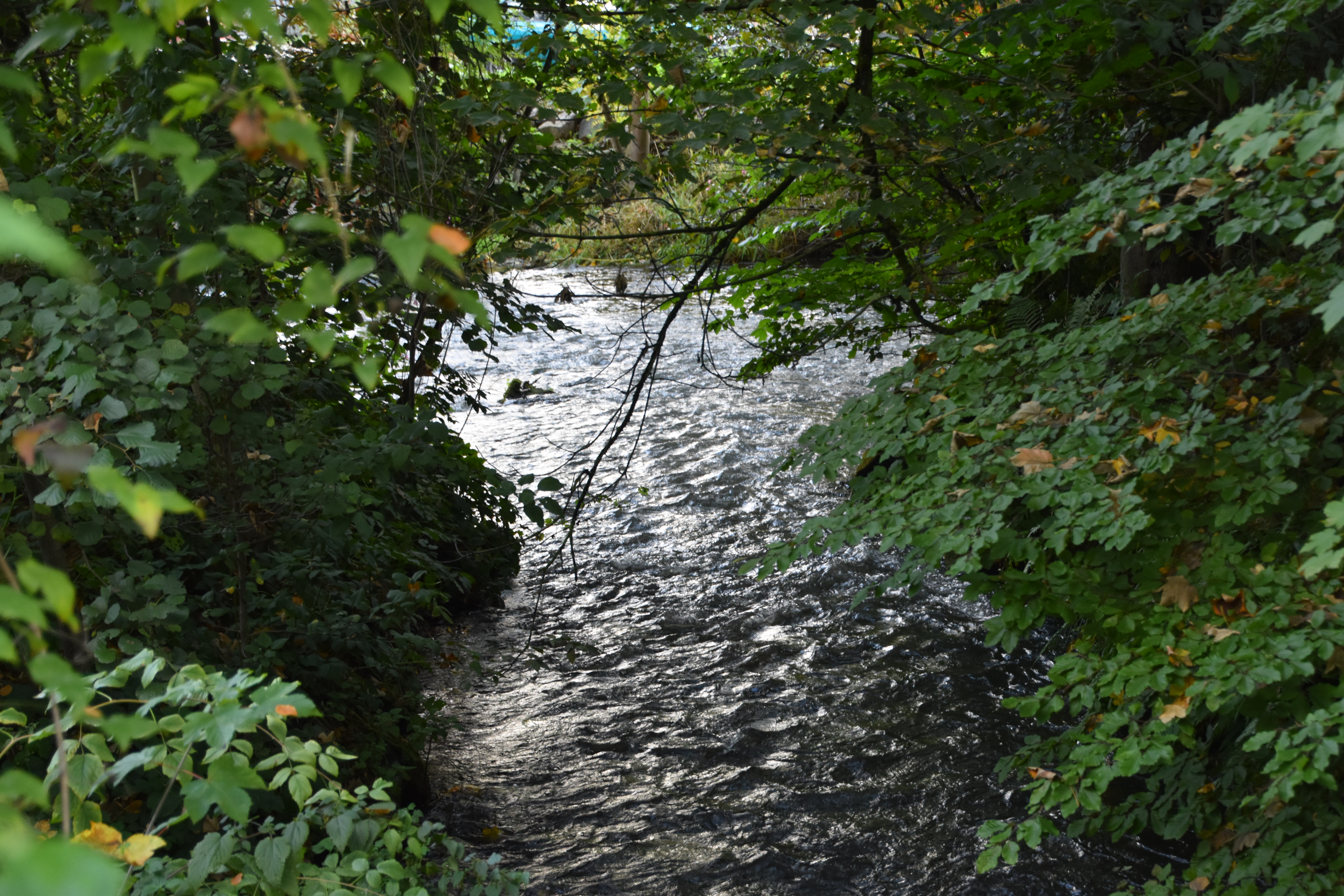

- Location of mouth in Lower Saxony

Location
- Country: Germany
- State: Lower Saxony

Physical characteristics
- Source
  - location: east of Osterode
  - coordinates: 51°43′19″N 10°19′13″E
  - elevation: ca. 460 m above sea level (NN)
- Mouth
  - location: in Osterode into the Söse
  - coordinates: 51°44′10″N 10°13′48″E
  - elevation: ca. 195 m above sea level (NN)
- Length: 8.5 km (5.3 mi)

Basin features
- Progression: Söse→ Rhume→ Leine→ Aller→ Weser→ North Sea

The Apenke is a left tributary of the Söse in Osterode in the Harz Mountains in the German state of Lower Saxony.

== Course ==
The Apenke rises south of the Feenhöhe heights in the Bärengarten. It flows initially parallel to the Eipenke stream in a southwesterly direction. Near Augustental it is joined by more water draining from the Teufelsbäder moor. For the rest of its course the Apenke flows northwest and feeds the ponds of Kaiserteich and Pferdeteich. In the Osterode town district of Petershütte it empties into the Söse.

== History ==
The water power of the Apenke used to be used to drive the various water wheels for gypsum, corn and saw mills. In 1991, the Apenke was polluted in Osterode by 8 m^{3} (280 cu ft) of diesel fuel.

The following is a translation of the verses (rhyming in the original German) written by Manfred Kleiner about the Apenke:

Pure and clear all silvery bright,
is the Apenke's little spring
on the Harz's western rim,
where I found the little beck's source.
There, where the stream begins its sally,
where the water runs down the valley,
under trees and hidden well
still untainted,
the Apenke murmurs quietly,
wanting to reach Osterode.
Happy to escape the dark forest
it helps to refresh the meadows
and fills along its way
pond after pond with water.
This habitat for fish
also helps to refresh the sheep
and is, as is clear to anyone,
the home of a huge flock of ducks.
Half hidden, to the side of paths
it flows gently through the terrain,
its water keeping gardens looked after,
it only has to be nimbly scooped up.
At the Apenke's mouth at last
has the Apenke reached its end,
it gives its water without complaining
to the millstream and its continuation.

== See also ==
- List of rivers of Lower Saxony
