= Karst Trail =

Marked and signed footpath in Germany

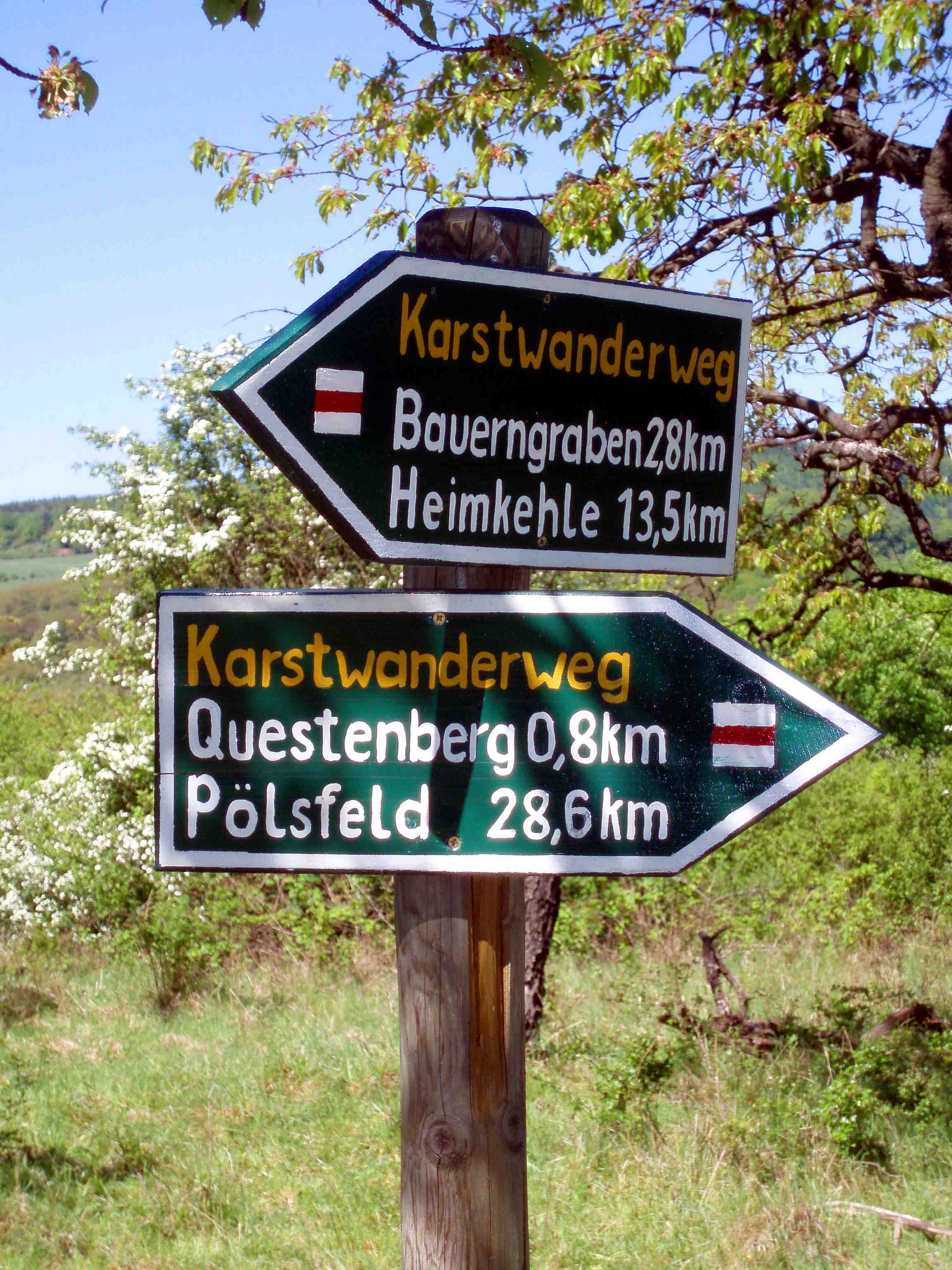
Signposts on the Karstwanderweg

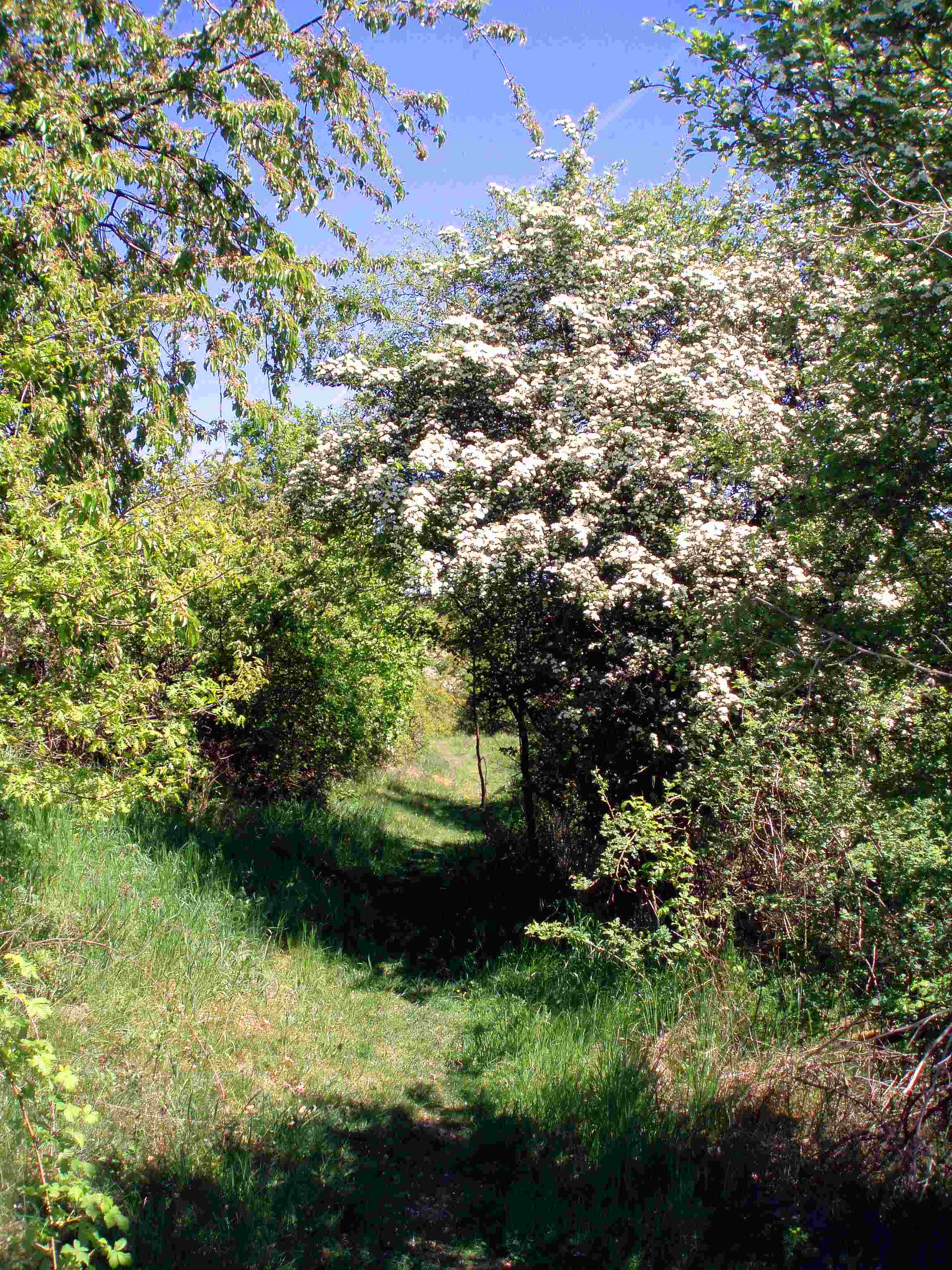
Hawthorn on the Karstwanderweg near Questenberg

The Karst Trail (German: Karstwanderweg) is a marked and signed footpath that runs for over 250 kilometres between Förste in Lower Saxony and Pölsfeld in Saxony-Anhalt through the karst landscape of the South Harz in Germany.

The path runs past a number of areas of natural beauty, including caves like the Heimkehle and the Barbarossa Cave, sinkholes like the Juessee and the Schwimmende Insel, depressions, moor landscapes like the Teufelsbäder, karst springs like the Rhumequelle and the Teufelsloch, disappearing streams and subterranean rivers like the Bauerngraben and gypsum rocks.
