= Otryt =

Mountain range in Poland

Coordinates: 49°14′30.2″N 22°38′04″E

Otryt is a mountain range in the Bieszczady Mountains of south-eastern Poland. It is located north of the San river. Its highest point is Trohaniec (939 m). Otryt is a long, straight ridge, approx. 18 km long, covered with fir and beech forests.
