= Eipenke =

River in Germany

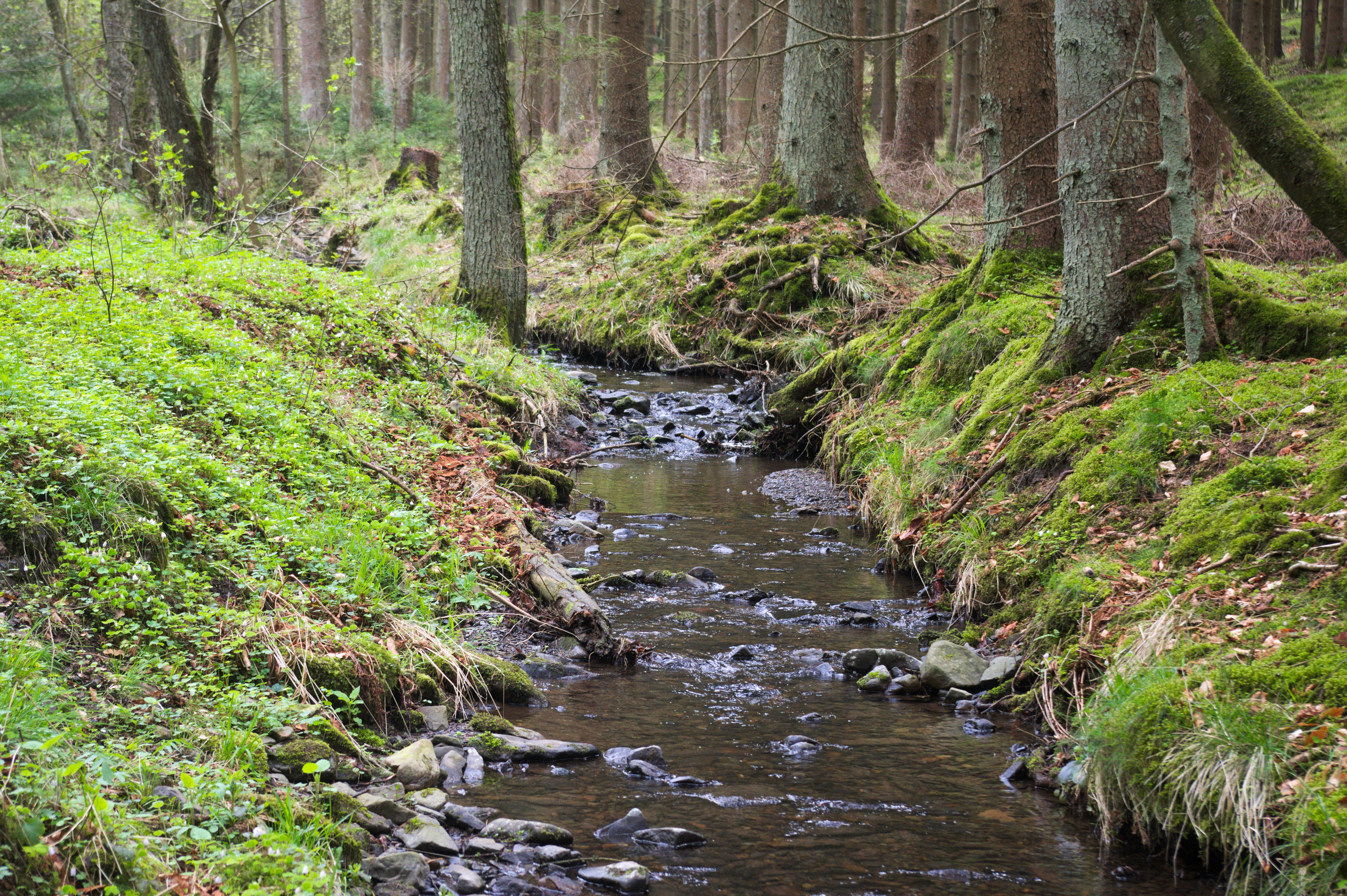

Location
- Country: Germany
- State: Lower Saxony

Physical characteristics
- Source
  - location: south of the Söse Reservoir
  - coordinates: 51°43′40″N 10°20′10″E
  - elevation: ca. 470 m above sea level (NN)
- Mouth
  - location: east of Osterode into the Söse
  - coordinates: 51°43′53″N 10°17′37″E
  - elevation: ca. 260 m above sea level (NN)
- Length: 3.5 km

Basin features
- Progression: Söse→ Rhume→ Leine→ Aller→ Weser→ North Sea

The Eipenke is a left tributary of the River Söse near Osterode in the Harz Mountains in the German state of Lower Saxony.

== Course ==
The Eipenke rises south of the Söse Reservoir and flows below the hill known as the Sösenkopf (423 m) in a western direction. It discharges into the Söse in the Osterode district of Scheerenberg.

== See also ==
- List of rivers of Lower Saxony
