= Lerbach (Söse) =

River in Germany

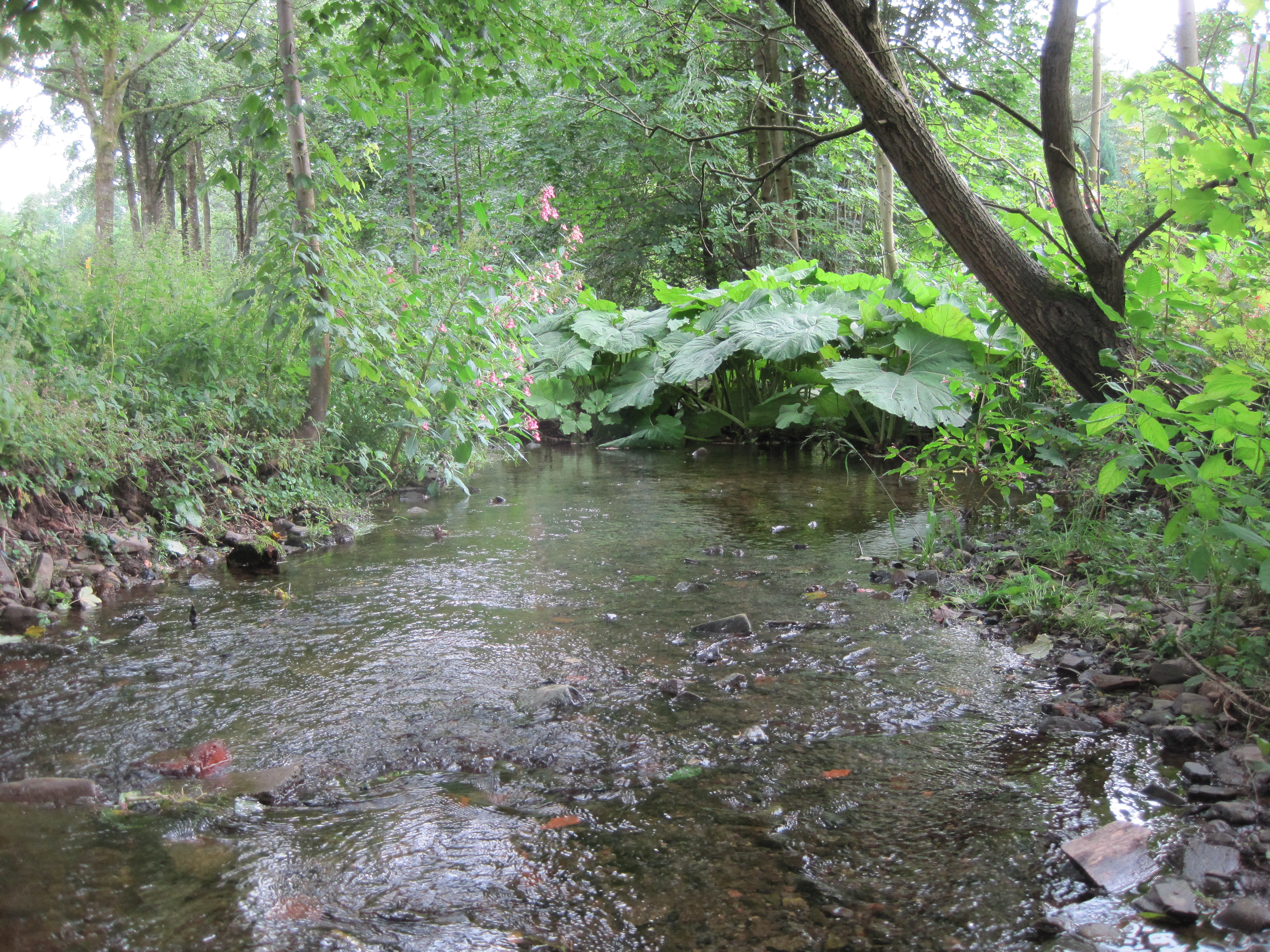
- Lerbach above the artificial pond Hüttenteich

Location
- Country: Germany
- State: Lower Saxony

Physical characteristics
- Source
  - location: Forrest spring south of Buntenbock
  - elevation: 596 m (1,955 ft)
- Mouth
  - location: Söse river in Osterode am Harz
  - coordinates: 51°43′46.19″N 10°15′08.59″E
  - elevation: 220 m (720 ft)
- Length: 7,970 m (26,150 ft)

Basin features
- Progression: Söse→ Rhume→ Leine→ Aller→ Weser→ North Sea

Lerbach is a small river of Lower Saxony, Germany. It flows into the Söse in Osterode am Harz.

== See also ==
- List of rivers of Lower Saxony
