= Große Schweimke =

River in Germany

Location
- Country: Germany
- State: Lower Saxony
- Location: Göttingen district

Physical characteristics
- Source
  - location: South of the Schindelkopf on the Acker ridge
  - coordinates: 51°42′41″N 10°20′29″E
  - elevation: 602 m above sea level
- Mouth
  - location: On the Kleine Steinau
  - coordinates: 51°42′03″N 10°18′04″E
  - elevation: 290 m above sea level
- Length: 3.2 km (2.0 mi)

Basin features
- Progression: Kleine Steinau→ Sieber→ Oder→ Rhume→ Leine→ Aller→ Weser→ North Sea
- Tributaries
  - right: Kleine Schweimke

The Große Schweimke is a river of Lower Saxony, Germany.

It is 3.2 km (2.0 mi) long and a tributary of the Kleine Steinau, north of Herzberg am Harz in the district of Göttingen. It rises at about 602 m above sea level and 1 km (0.6 mi) south of the Schindelkopf and roughly 600 m (2,000 ft) north of the Weinbergstraße road on the ridge known as Auf dem Acker. It flows initially in a southwesterly direction before swinging west and discharging into the Kleine Steinau.

== See also ==
- List of rivers of Lower Saxony

== Sources ==
- Topographische Karte 1:25000, Nr. 4228 Riefensbeek (source)
- Topographische Karte 1:25000, Nr. 4227 Osterode im Harz (mouth)
