= Kleine Steinau =

River in Germany

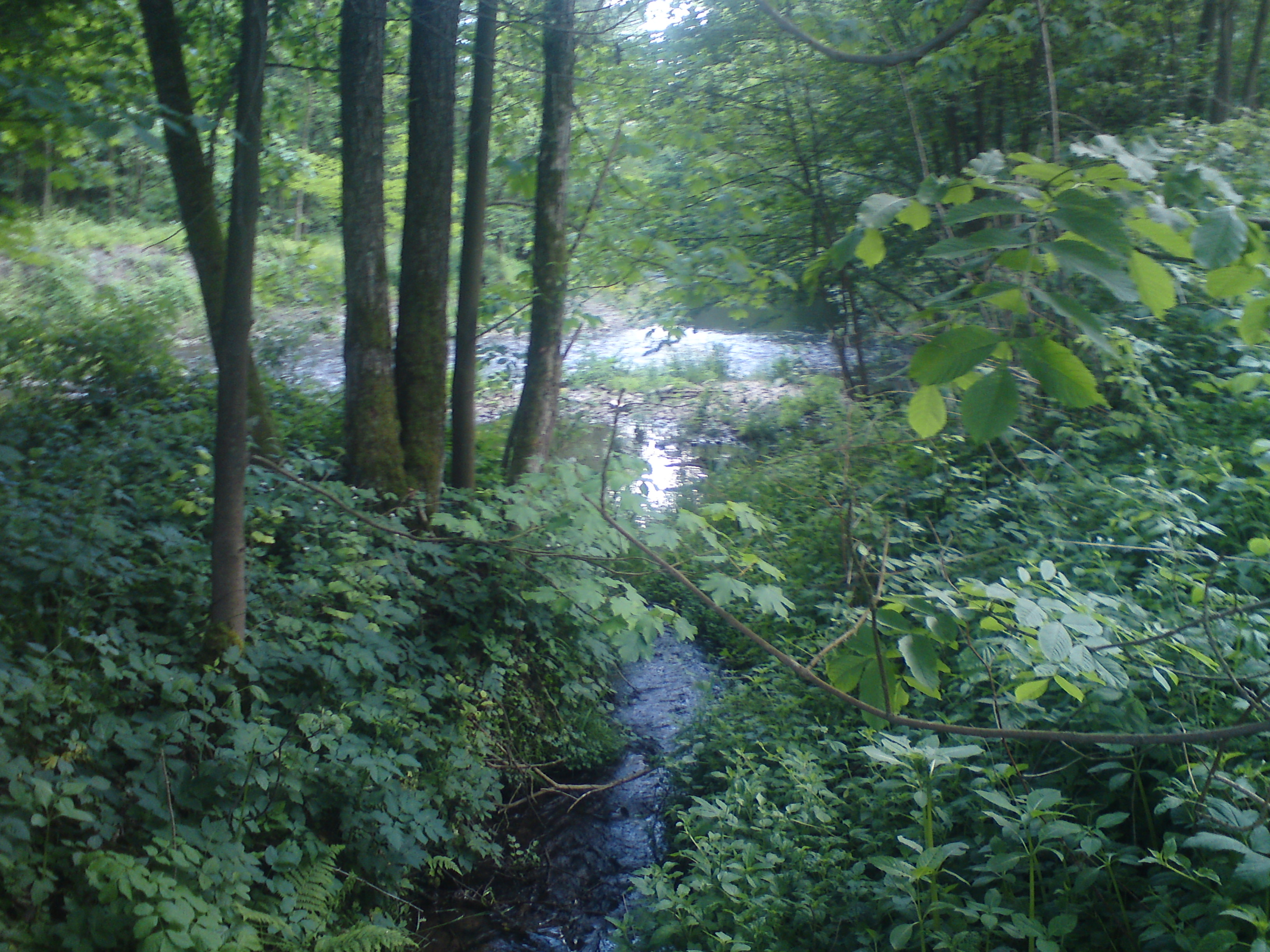

Location
- Country: Germany
- State: Lower Saxony
- District: Göttingen

Physical characteristics
- Source
  - location: Between Schindelkopf and Spießerklippe on the Auf dem Acker
  - coordinates: 51°43′02″N 10°21′05″E
  - elevation: 690 m above sea level
- Mouth
  - location: Near Aschenhütte into the Sieber
  - coordinates: 51°40′26″N 10°18′06″E
  - elevation: 210 m above sea level
- Length: 9.1 km (5.7 mi)

Basin features
- Progression: Sieber→ Oder→ Rhume→ Leine→ Aller→ Weser→ North Sea
- Tributaries
  - left: Große Schweimke

Kleine Steinau is a river of Lower Saxony, Germany. It is a 9.1-kilometre-long (5.7 mi) tributary of the Sieber, north of Herzberg am Harz in the district of Göttingen.

The Kleine Steina rises at about 690 m (2,260 ft) between the Schindelkopf mountain and the Spießerklippe crags on the ridge of Auf dem Acker. It initially flows in a westerly direction, but later swings south before emptying into the River Sieber near the small settlement of Aschenhütte, not far from the mouth of the Große Steinau. In the upper reaches of the Kleine Steinau it is also called the Schindelgraben, although it is not clear from the maps at which point the name changes.

== See also ==
- List of rivers of Lower Saxony

== Sources ==
- Topographische Karte 1:25000, Nr. 4228 Riefensbeek
- Topographische Karte 1:25000, Nr. 4227 Osterode im Harz
- Topographische Karte 1:25000, Nr. 4327 Gieboldehausen
