= Söse =

River in Germany

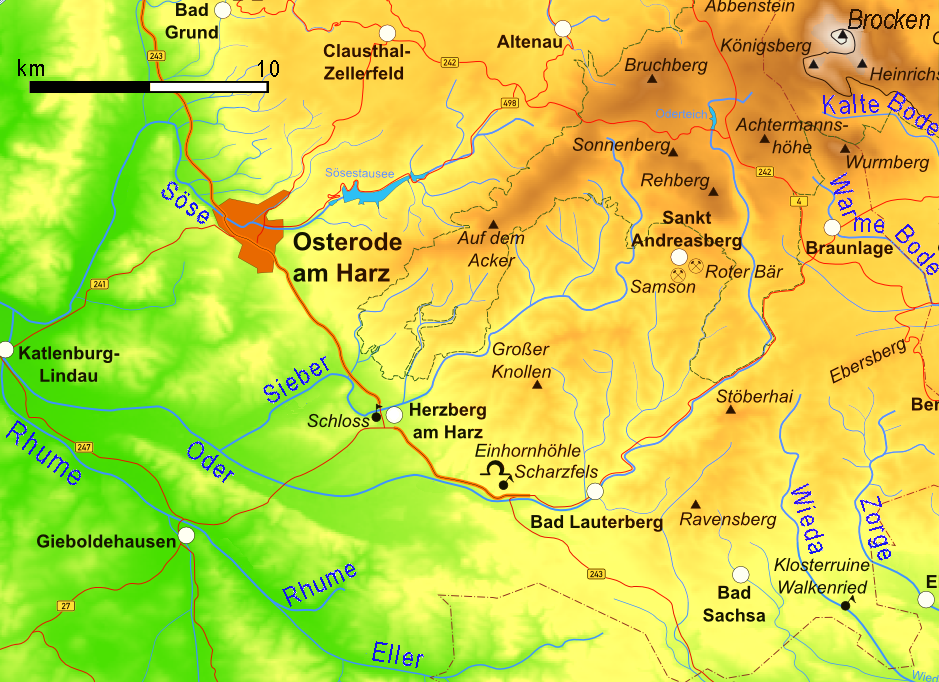
- The southwestern Harz with the River Söse

Location
- Country: Germany
- State: Lower Saxony
- Reference no.: DE: 48828

Physical characteristics
- Source
  - location: Auf dem Acker in the Harz
  - elevation: ca. 800 m above sea level (NN)
- Mouth
  - location: Into the Rhume near Katlenburg-Lindau
  - coordinates: 51°41′58″N 10°06′24″E
  - elevation: 130 m above sea level (NN)
- Length: 37.8 km (23.5 mi)
- Basin size: 213 km^{2} (82 sq mi)
- Discharge
  - location: at Riefensbeek gauge
  - average: 0.654 m^{3}/s (23.1 cu ft/s)
  - minimum: Record low: 0.012 m^{3}/s (0.42 cu ft/s) (in 20.08.2003); Average low: 0.070 m^{3}/s (2.5 cu ft/s)
  - maximum: Average high: 13.3 m^{3}/s (470 cu ft/s); Record high: 56.5 m^{3}/s (2,000 cu ft/s) (in 01.08.1967)

Basin features
- Progression: Rhume→ Leine→ Aller→ Weser→ North Sea
- Landmarks: Large towns: Osterode
- Tributaries
  - left: Alte Söse
  - right: Große Bremke, Sülpkebach, Markau
- Waterbodies: Reservoirs: Söse Reservoir

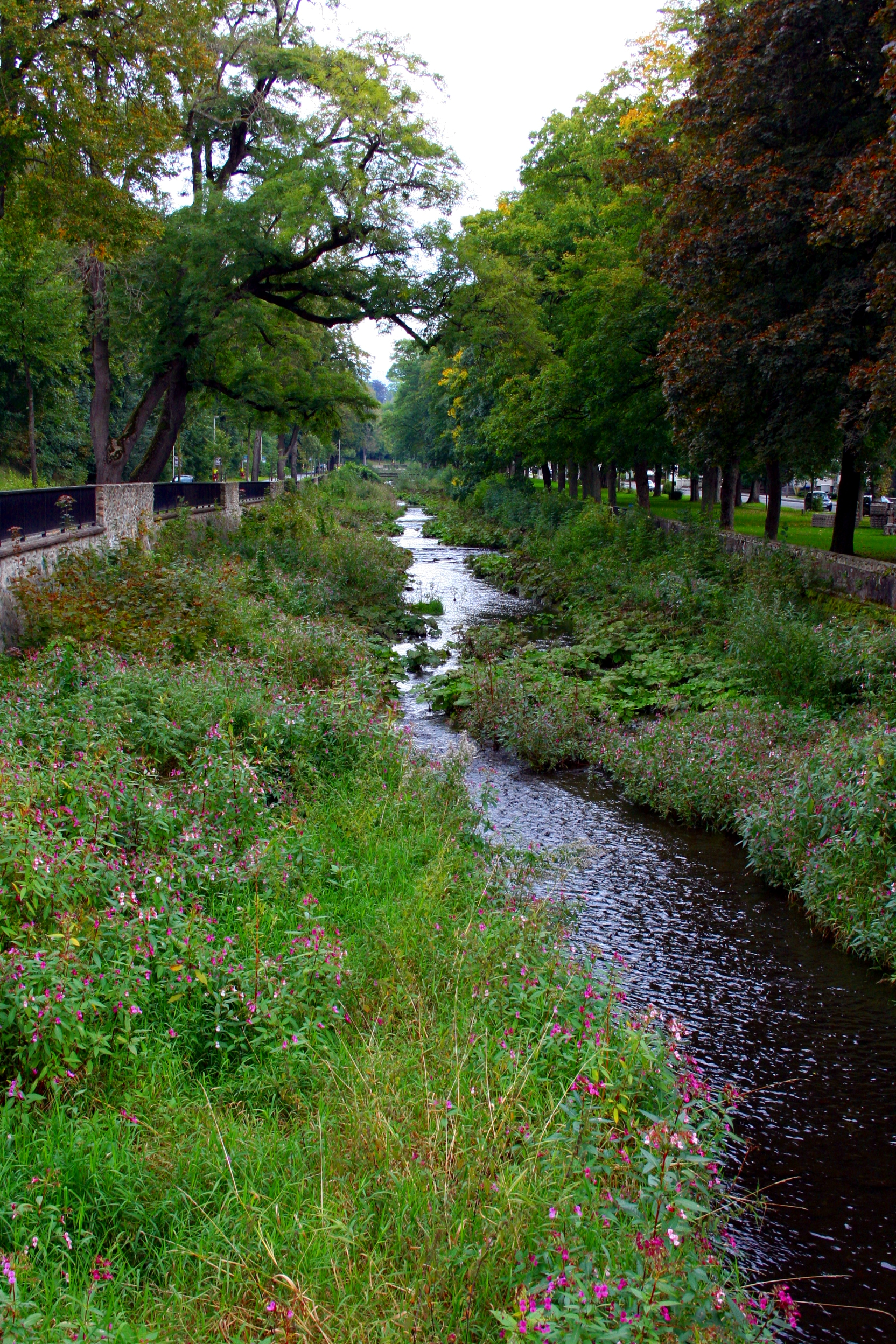
The Söse in Osterode

Söse (German pronunciation: [ˈzøːzə]) is a river of Lower Saxony, Germany. It is a right tributary of the river Rhume and 38 kilometres (24 mi) long.

== Geography ==
The Söse rises on the plateau of Auf dem Acker in the district of Göttingen in the southwestern part of the Harz Mountains in Germany. From there it flows initially westwards; and is then impounded at a pre-dam and then by the Söse Dam between the Osterode village of Riefensbeek and the town of Osterode itself. In Osterode the river bends northwest, only to swing westwards near Badenhausen and then southwards near Eisdorf just a few kilometres west of the Harz. It flows in that direction through Osterode-Dorste before entering the westward-flowing Rhume between the villages of Berka and Elvershausen, both part of the borough of Katlenburg-Lindau in the district of Northeim.

== Tributaries ==
- Große Söse ("Great Söse", left headstream)
- Kleine Söse ("Little Söse", right headstream)
- Große Limpig (right)
- Eipenke (left)
- Ospenke (left)
- Lerbach (right)
- Apenke (left)
- Große Bremke (right)
- Wellbeek (right)
- Uferbach (right)
- Sulpebach (right)
- Markau (right)
- Bierbach (right)
- Dornkesbach (right)
- Goldbach (right)
- Salza (left)
- Dorster Mühlenbach (left)

== Walking ==
At the confluence of the Great Söse and the Great Morgenbrod is the Morgenbrodt Hut (ca. 600 bis 605 m above NN; 146 – Morgenbrodt Hut 51.76260°N 10.44573°E). This spot is no. 148 in the system of checkpoints in the Harzer Wandernadel hiking network. The Morgenbrodt Hut was demolished in 2013 by the National Park Authority as it was falling down and it is not intended to be replaced.

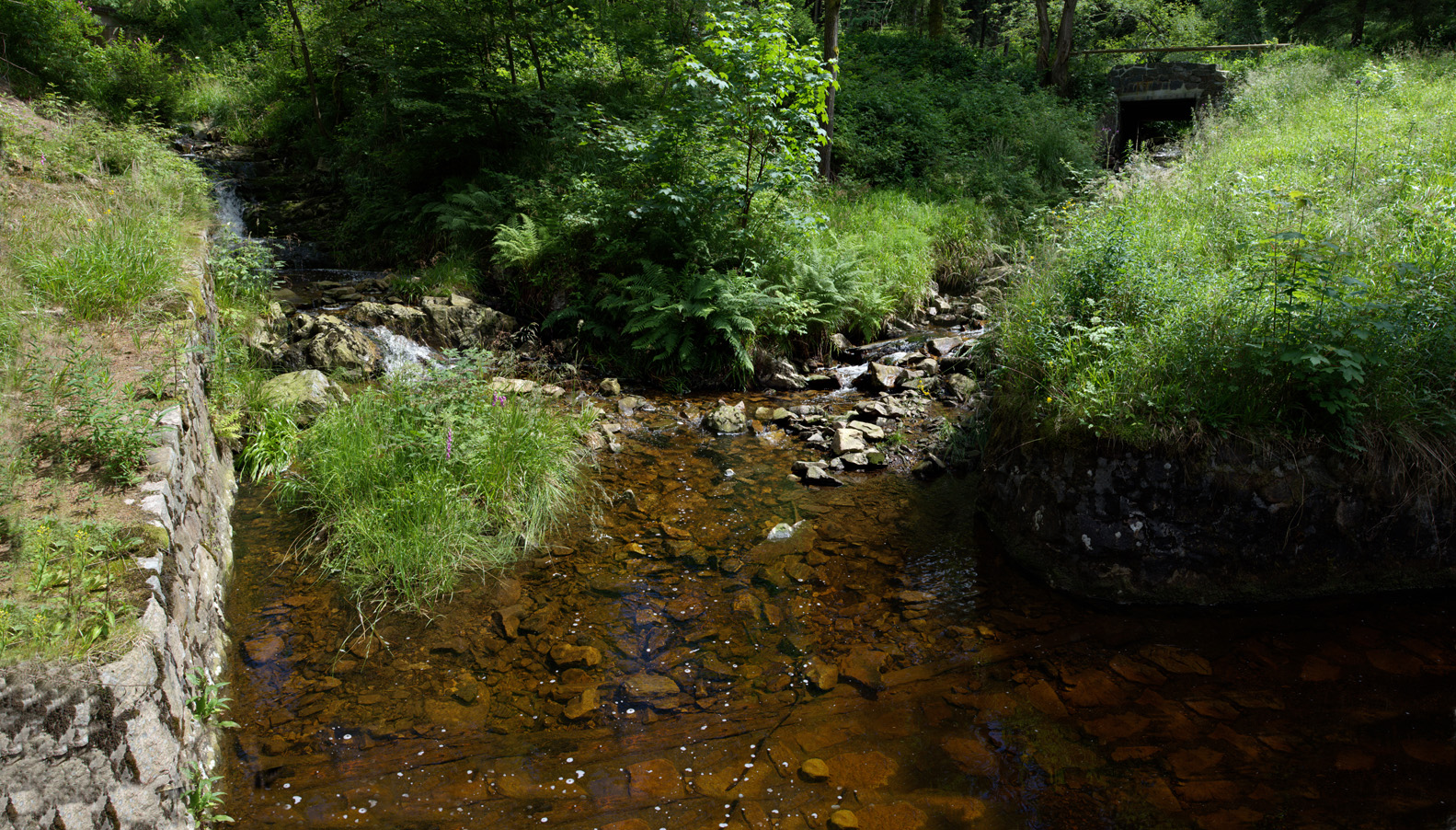
Confluence of the Great Söse and Great Morgenbrod by the Morgenbrodt Valley Hut HWN 146

== See also ==
- List of rivers of Lower Saxony
