= Söse Dam =

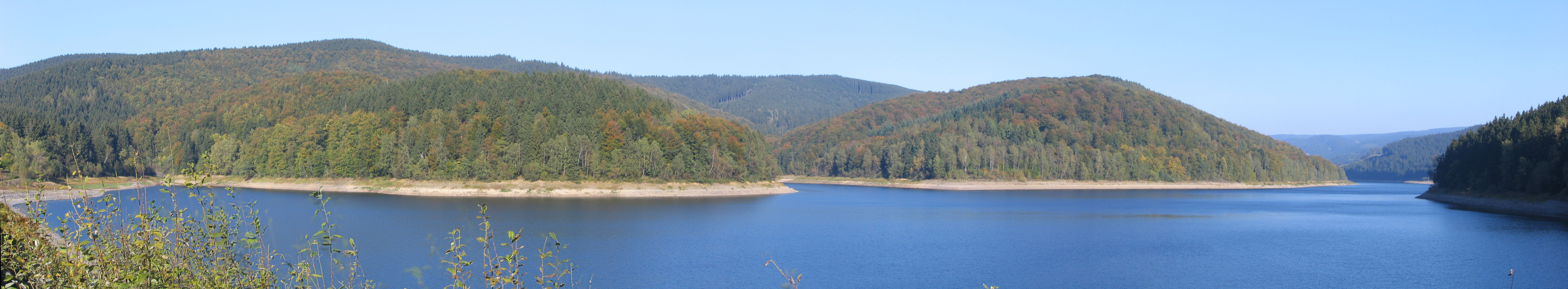

- Location within Germany
- Country: Germany
- Location: Lower Saxony
- Coordinates: 51°44′21″N 10°19′34″E
- Construction began: 1928 (Harzwasserwerke)
- Opening date: 1931

Dam and spillways
- Type of dam: Embankment dam
- Height: 56 m (184 ft)
- Length: 485 m (1,591 ft)
- Width (crest): 9 m (30 ft)
- Dam volume: 1,900,000 m^{3} (67,000,000 ft^{3})

Reservoir
- Total capacity: 26,250,000 m^{3} (927,000,000 ft^{3})
- Catchment area: 49 km^{2} (19 mi^{2})
- Surface area: 124 ha (0 mi^{2})

Power Station
- Installed capacity: 1.44 MW

The Söse Dam is a dam in the Lower Saxon part of the Harz mountains near Osterode in the German state of Lower Saxony.

It was the first modern dam and reservoir complex (German: Talsperre) to be built in the Harz and was constructed by the Harzwasserwerke between 1928 and 1931. It is used for flood prevention, electricity generation, supplying drinking water and for raising water levels during times of low water. The construction of the dam cost 14.7 million Reichsmarks at the time. The Harzwasserwerke still operate the dam today. In 1933 construction began on a long-distance water pipe from the Söse reservoir, whose northern branch goes as far as Bremen. Today it mainly supplies towns and communities in the Hildesheim and Hanover areas. Since 1980 the town of Göttingen has also been supplied with drinking water from the reservoir.

== Main dam ==
The main barrier is an earth-fill dam with a central concrete core and clay sealing. The hydro-electric power station, which is used to supply electricity at peak loading periods, has a power of 1.44 MW and an annual energy output of 3.10 GWh. The spillway is located on the southern abutment of the dam with the hillside.

== Pre-dam ==
The Söse Reservoir has a pre-dam (Vorsperre) upstream, which is 200 m long and 20 m high and has a volume of 0.75 million m³. Its reservoir acts as a sediment trap to catch any particles in the river before they get to the main reservoir. In addition there is also a stilling basin (Ausgleichsbecken) below the primary dam, with a 10 m high dam wall, which controls any irregularity arising from the flow of water through the primary dam, power station and waterworks.

== Leisure ==
Camping, fishing and walking are permitted. The path around the reservoir is 9 km long. There used to be a restaurant by the main dam, but it has since been demolished.

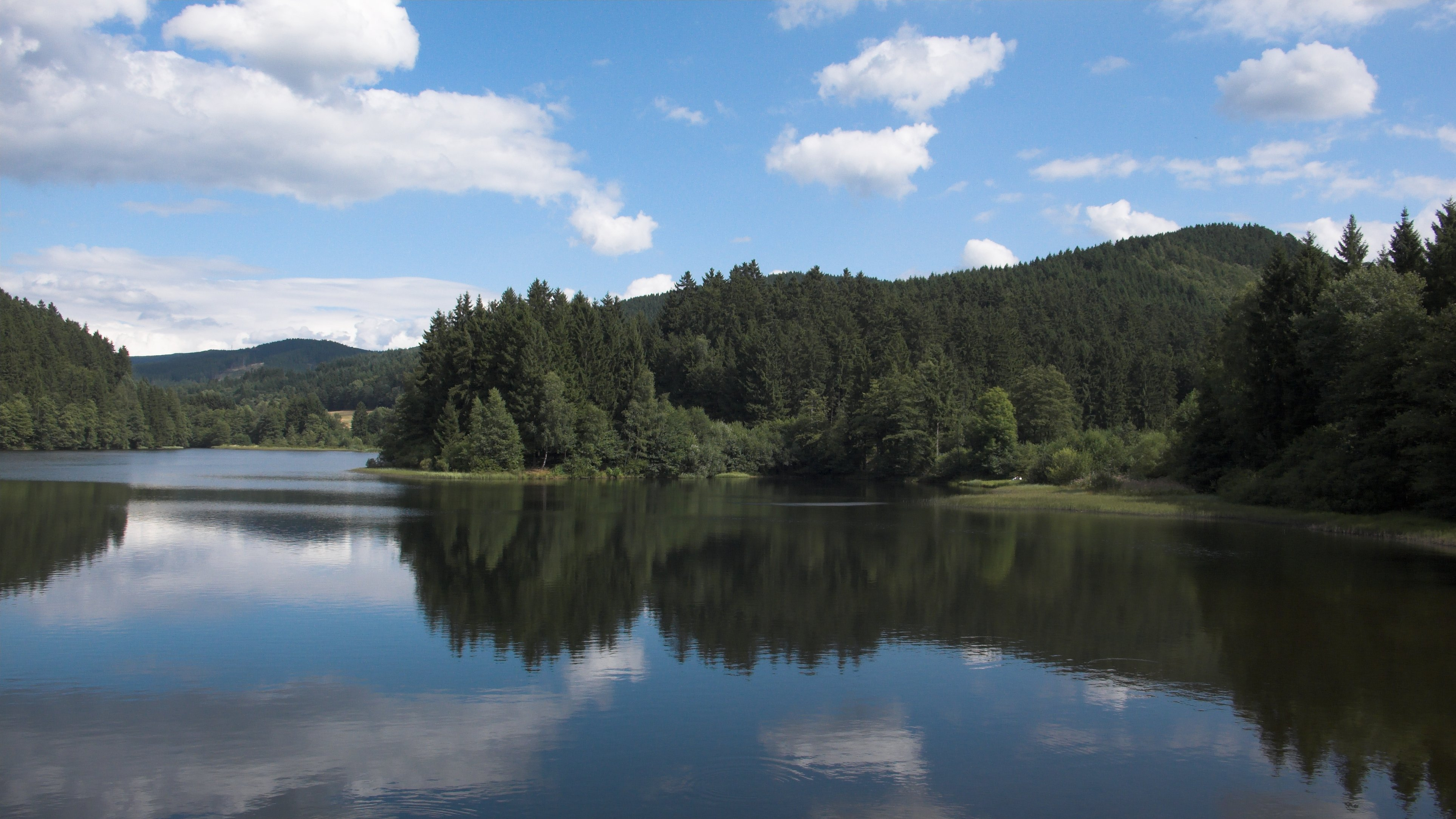
The pre-dam.

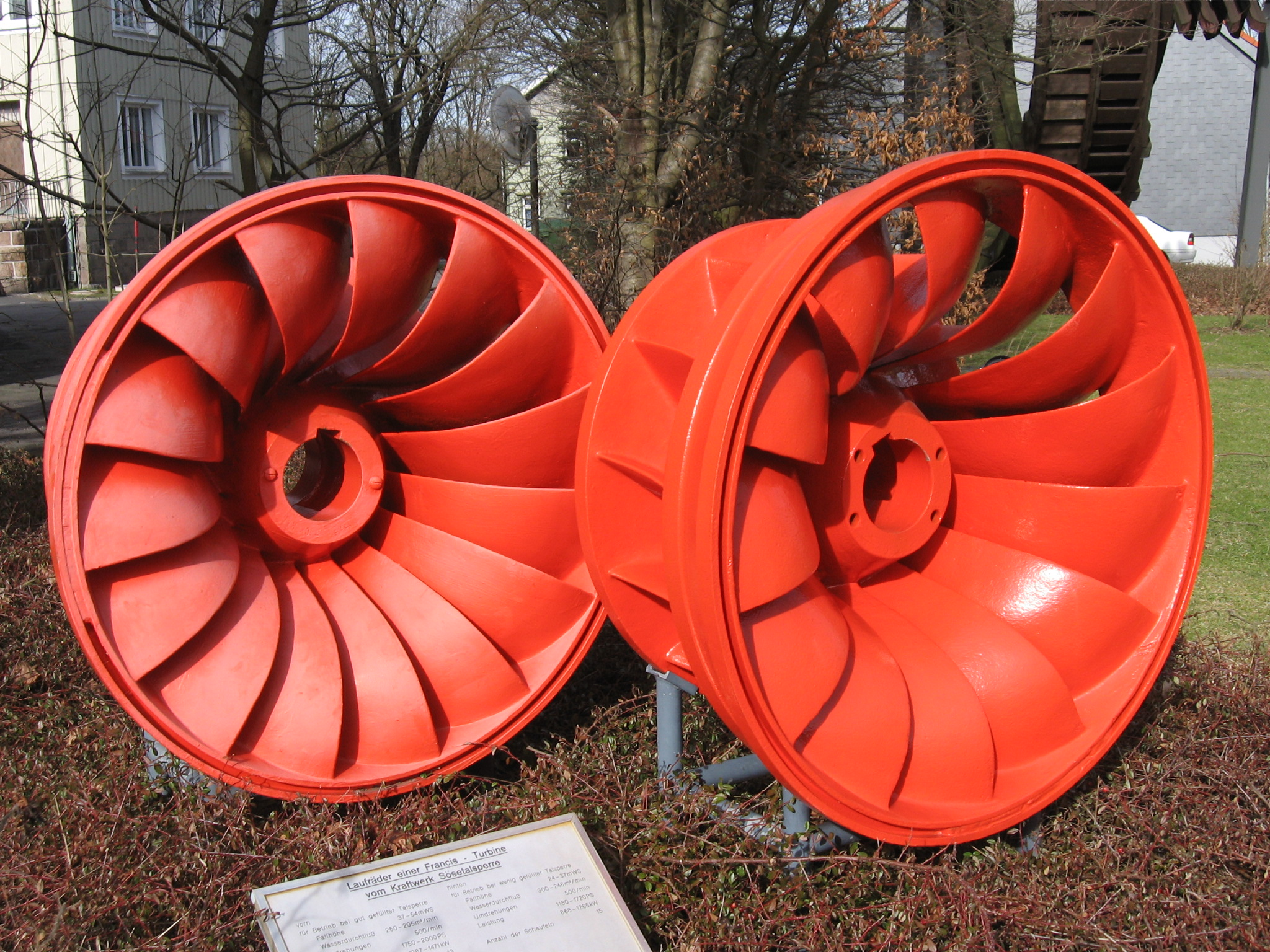
Rotors of a Francis turbine from the Söse Dam power station

== See also ==
- List of reservoirs and dams in Germany
- List of dams in the Harz

== Notes ==
- Peter Franke; Wolfgang Frey (1987), damn in The Bundesrepublik Germany (in German), Berlin: Systemdruck, ISBN 3-926520-00-0
