= Osterode am Harz =

Place in Lower Saxony, Germany

- Town
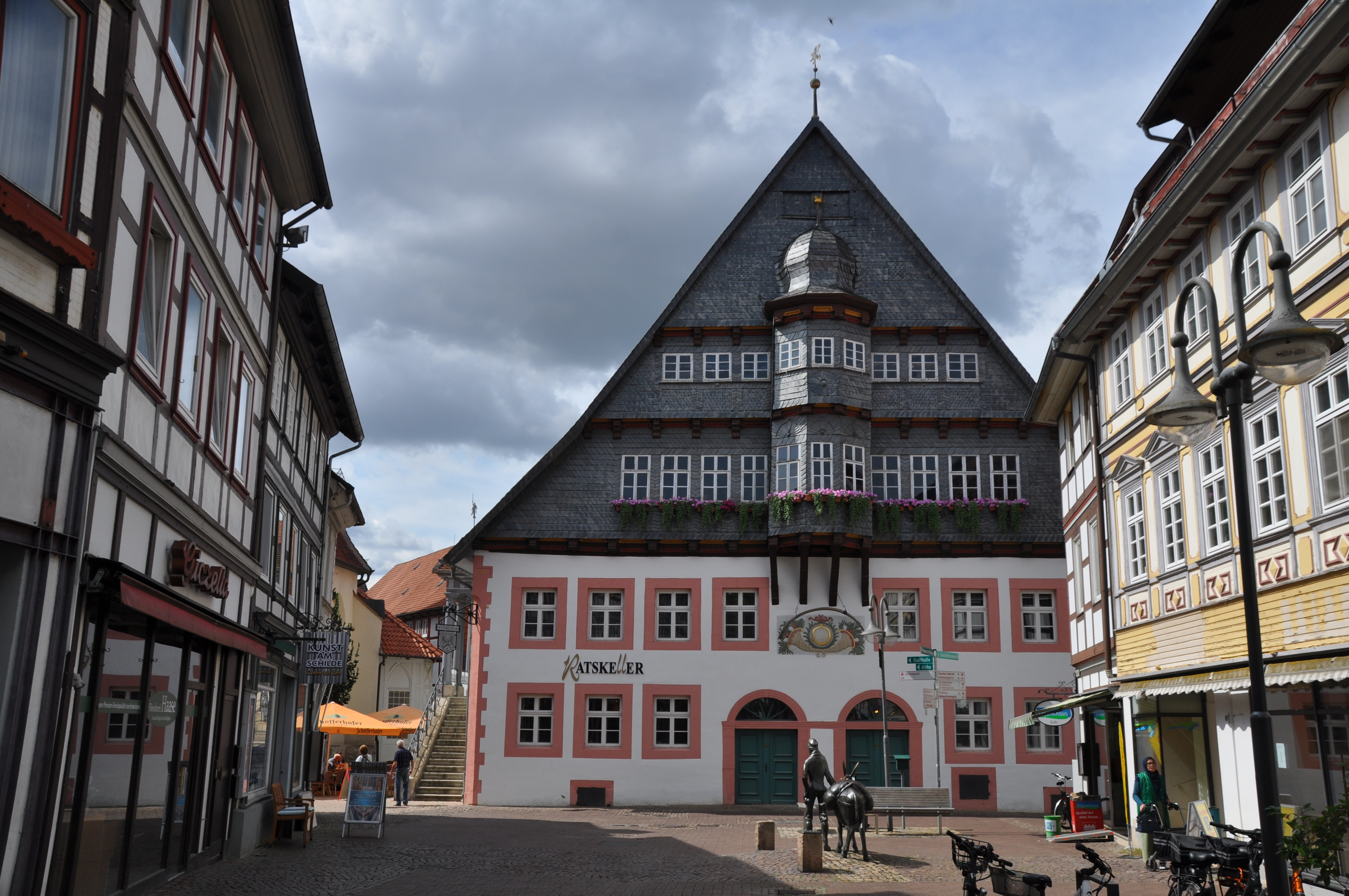
- Old Town Hall

- Coat of arms

- Location of Osterode am Harz within Göttingen district
- Interactive map of Osterode am Harz
- Location within Germany Location within Lower Saxony
- Coordinates: 51°43′43″N 10°15′08″E
- Country: Germany
- State: Lower Saxony
- District: Göttingen

Government
  - Mayor (2019–24): Jens Augat (SPD)

Area
  - Total: 102.54 km^{2} (39.59 sq mi)
- Elevation: 220 m (720 ft)

Population (2025-12-31)
  - Total: 21,474
  - Density: 209.42/km^{2} (542.40/sq mi)
- Time zone: UTC+01:00 (CET)
  - Summer (DST): UTC+02:00 (CEST)
- Postal codes: 37520
- Dialling codes: 05522
- Vehicle registration: GÖ, OHA
- Website: www.osterode.de

Osterode am Harz (German pronunciation: [ɔstəˈʁoːdə ʔam ˈhaːɐ̯ts], lit. 'Osterode on the Harz'), often simply called Osterode (Eastphalian: Ostroe), is a town in south-eastern Lower Saxony in central Germany on the south-western edge of the Harz mountains. It was the seat of government of the district of Osterode. Osterode is located on the German Timber-Frame Road.

== Geography ==
=== Water ===
The Söse River flows through the town from the reservoir for the Söse Dam about 5 km upstream. The dam was built in 1931 and has a capacity of 25.5 million m³. The Harzwasserwerke water company pipes drinking water as far away as Bremen.

=== Districts ===
The following districts (mainly surrounding villages) are part of the borough of Osterode am Harz, with populations in brackets (as of 1 July 2012):

- Dorste (1,650)
- Düna (140)
- Förste (2,000)
- Freiheit (2,100)
- Katzenstein (1,200)
- Lasfelde (1,300)
- Lerbach (1,000)
- Marke (150)
- Nienstedt am Harz (440)
- Osterode am Harz (11,500)
- Petershütte (800)
- Riefensbeek-Kamschlacken (350)
- Schwiegershausen (1,800)
- Ührde (100)

== History ==
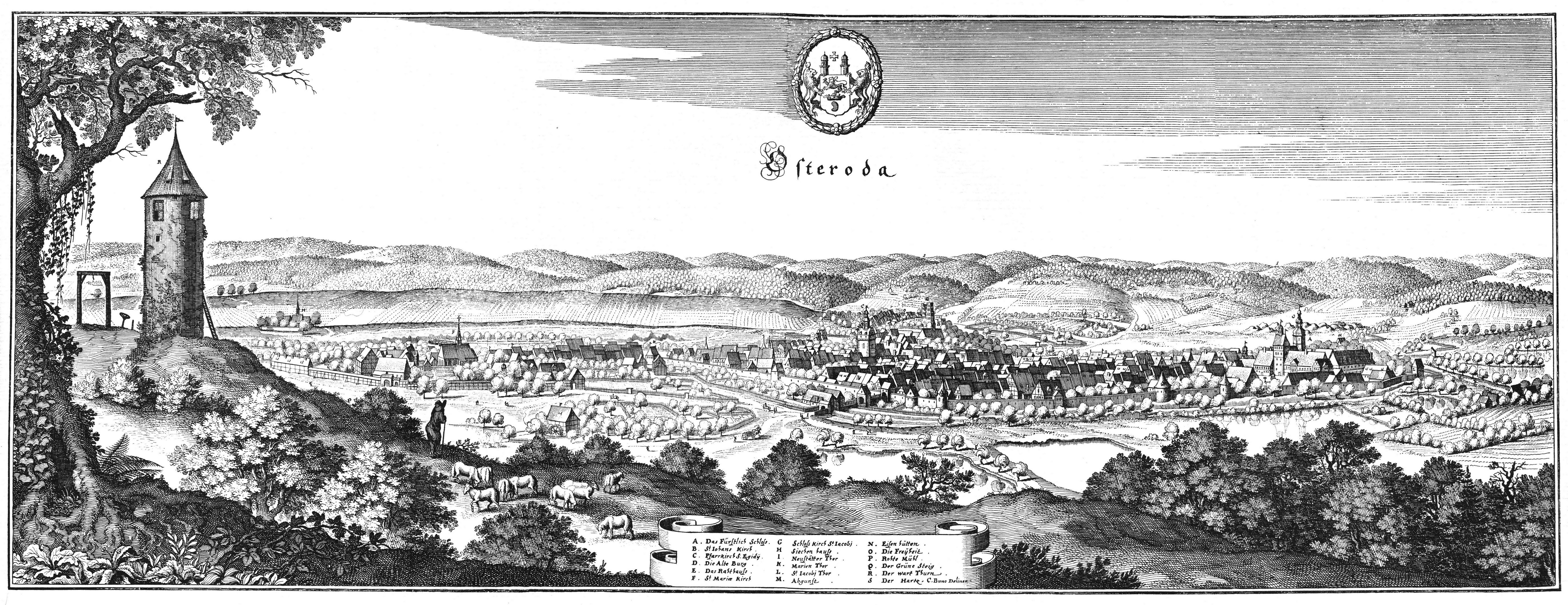
17th-century view of Osterode

Osterode was granted town rights in the early 13th century. Defensive walls were built in the 13th century, and then expanded by 1330. In 1510, it was the site of riots and the townspeople murdered the town's mayor. In response, Duke Philip I held a court session, after which the leaders of the riots were sentenced, town property was confiscated and municipal privileges were revoked. In 1545, the town suffered a fire. Frequent marches of troops and marauders, looting, high war taxes, epidemics etc. devastated the town during the Thirty Years' War of 1618–1648. Since 1665, Osterode belonged to the domain of the House of Hanover, which also ruled Great Britain.

In 1807 the town became part of the Napoleonic Kingdom of Westphalia, in 1813 it passed to the Kingdom of Hanover (in union with Britain), in 1866 it was annexed by the Kingdom of Prussia, and from 1871 it formed part of the German Empire. In 1905, the town had a population of 7,467.

The Great Depression caused a collapse of numerous local business, which led to mass unemployment and radicalisation of the people, and in 1933 the Nazi Party gained a majority in Osterode. During World War II, from 1939 to 1941, Osterode was the location of the Oflag XI-A prisoner-of-war camp for Polish officers, which was eventually relocated to Włodzimierz in German-occupied Poland, and, from 1944 to 1945, there was also a subcamp of the Buchenwald concentration camp for men of various nationalities. In April 1945, Osterode was captured by American troops. Following the war, it formed part of West Germany.

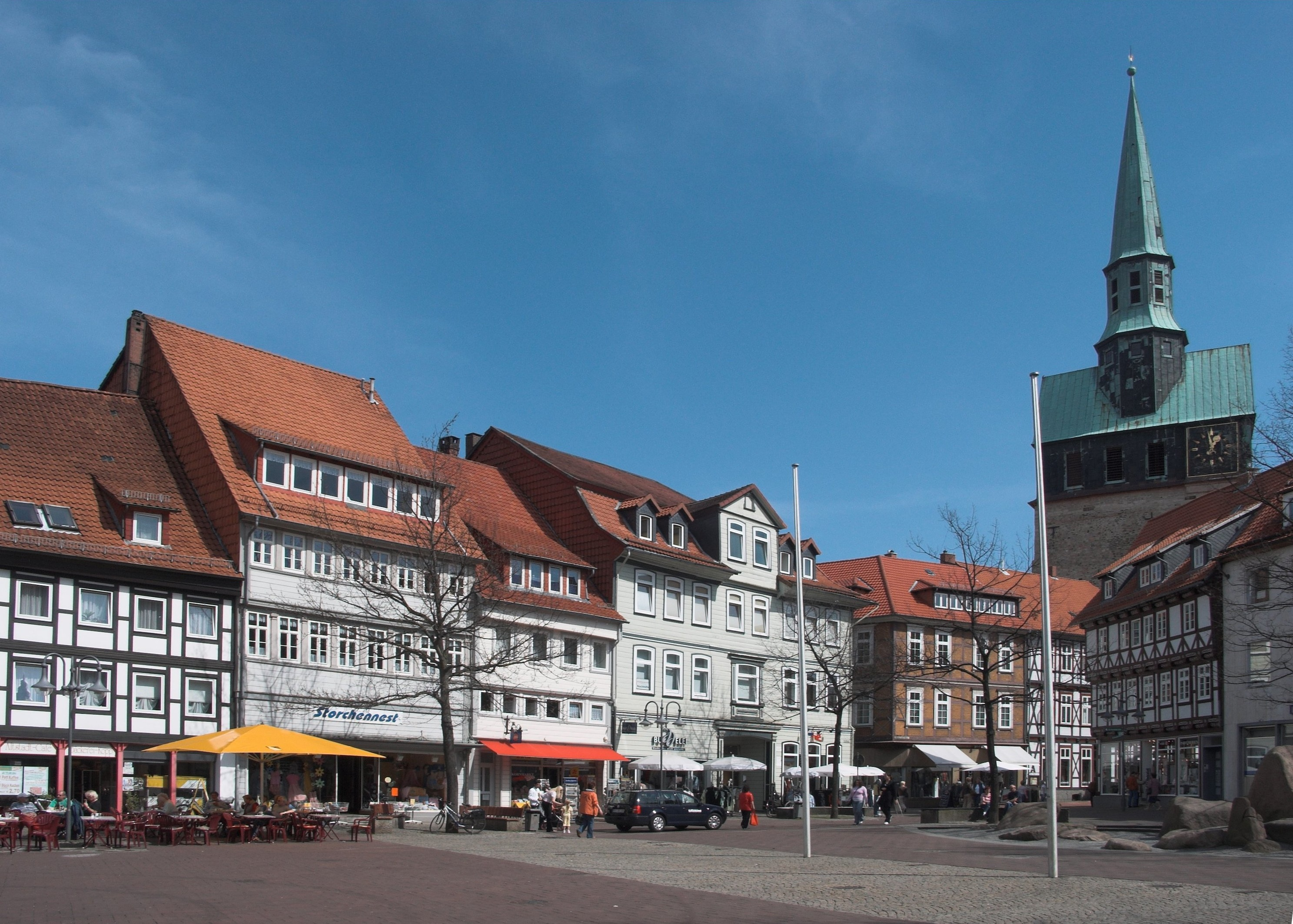
Kornmarkt (grain market)

== Political ==
=== Local council ===
The Gemeinderat or council of Osterode has 34 members:

- SPD: 16
- CDU: 12
- Grüne: 3
- FDP: 3

and one Bürgermeister (mayor). (local election on 11 September 2016)

=== Mayor ===
Jens Augat (SPD) has been Bürgermeister (mayor) of Osterode since 1 November 2019.

== Culture and attractions ==
=== Museums ===
The Museum im Ritterhaus displays documents from Osterode's history from the Middle Ages to the recent past, as well as occasional temporary exhibitions.

The Lichtenstein Cave is an archaeological site near Dorste, in the western part of the municipality. Two inhabitants of the village Nienstedt am Harz, 2 km north of the cave, have the same rare DNA pattern as that found in the skeletal material of a man whose bones were found in the Lichtenstein Cave dating to about 1000 BC.

=== Architecture ===
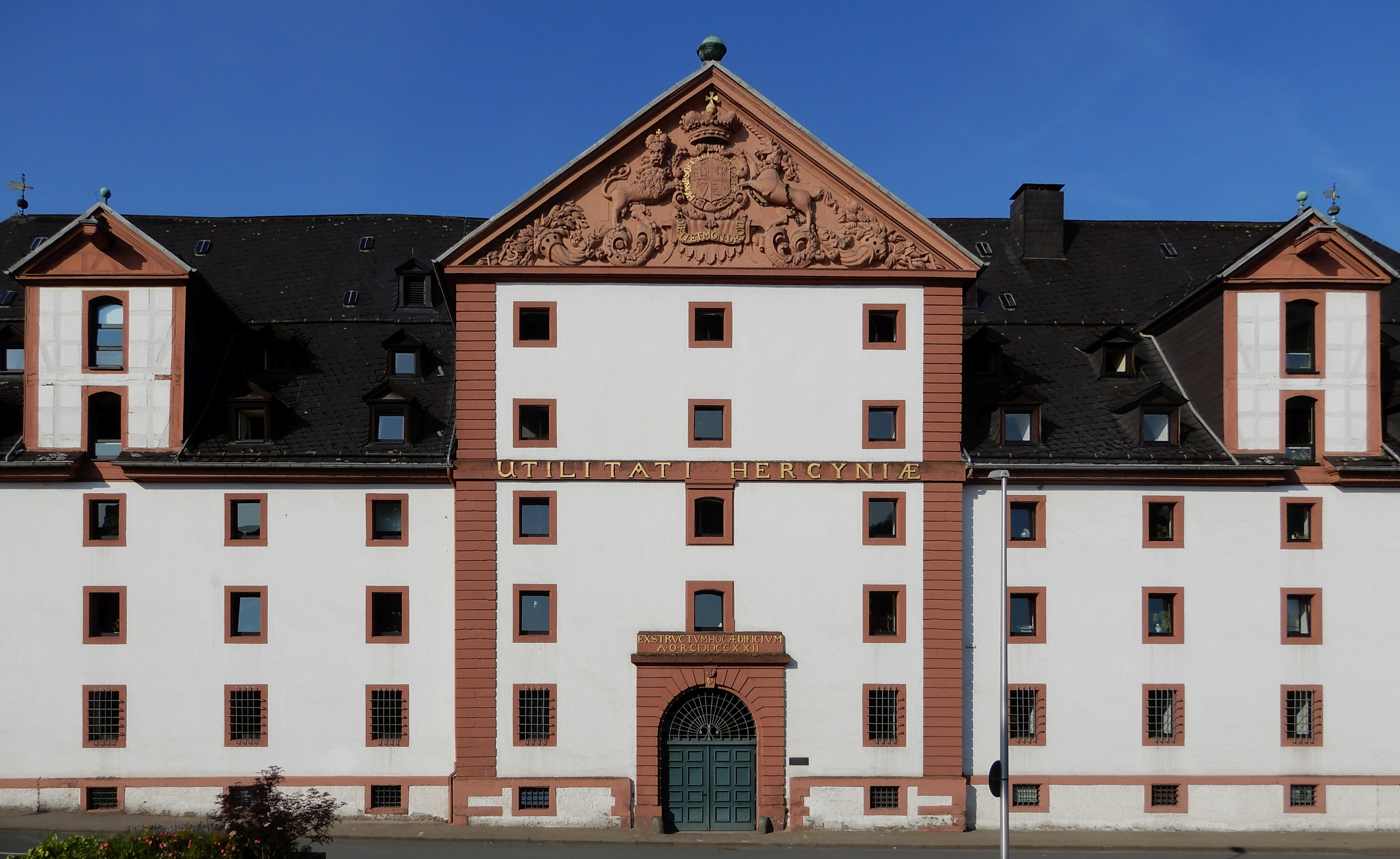
Granary with the 18th-century coat of arms of Great Britain at the top

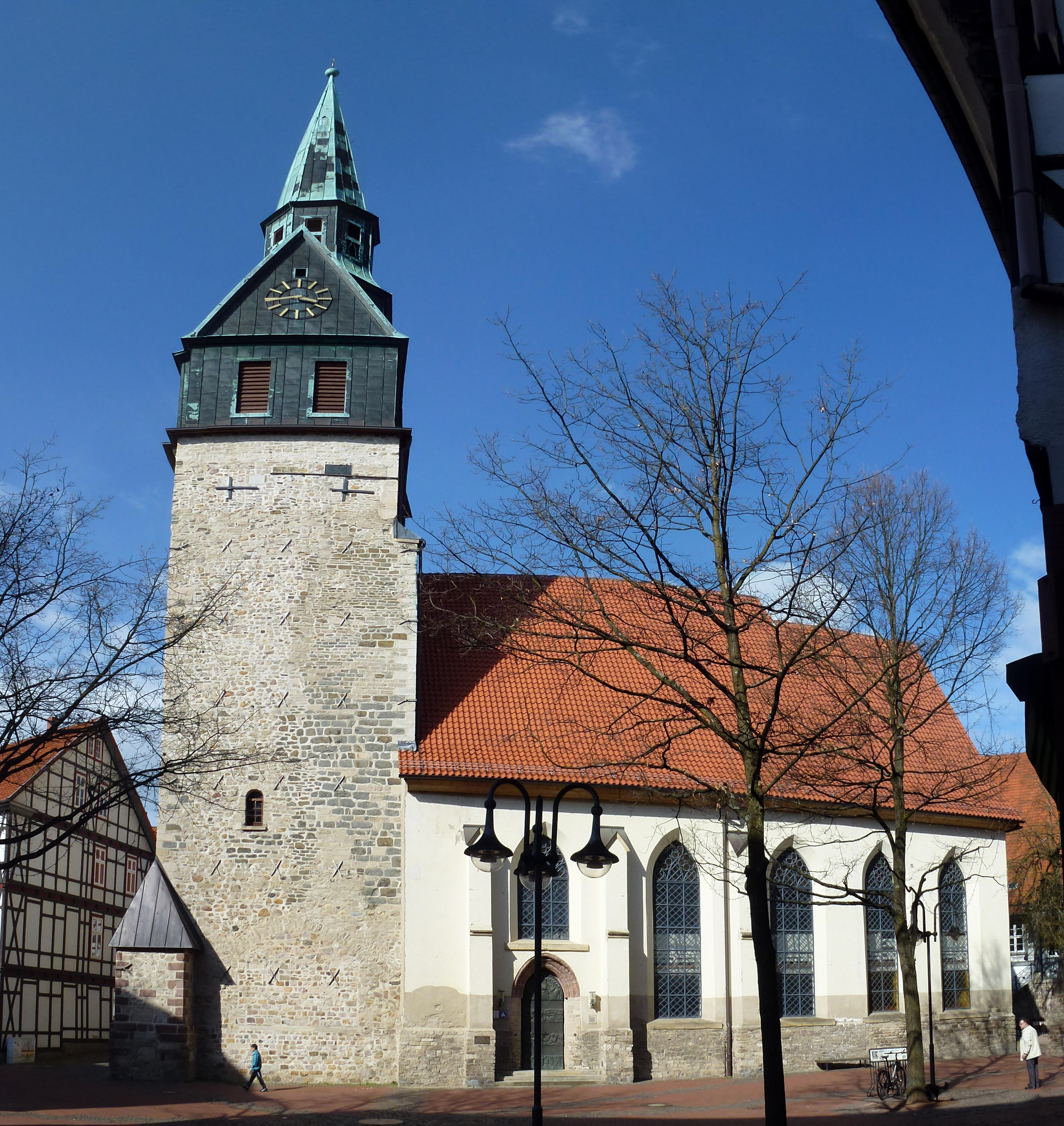
Saint Giles church

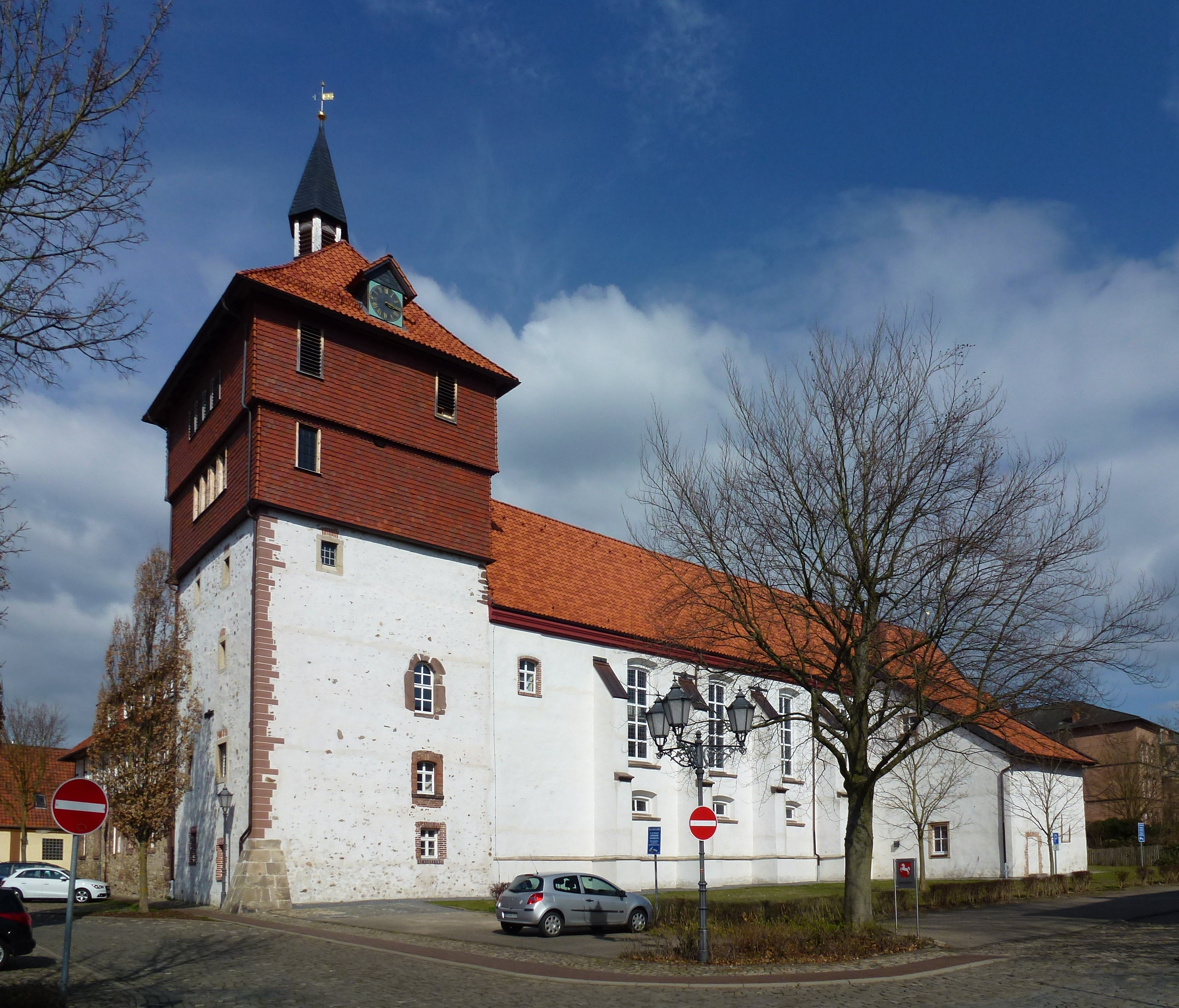
Saint James church

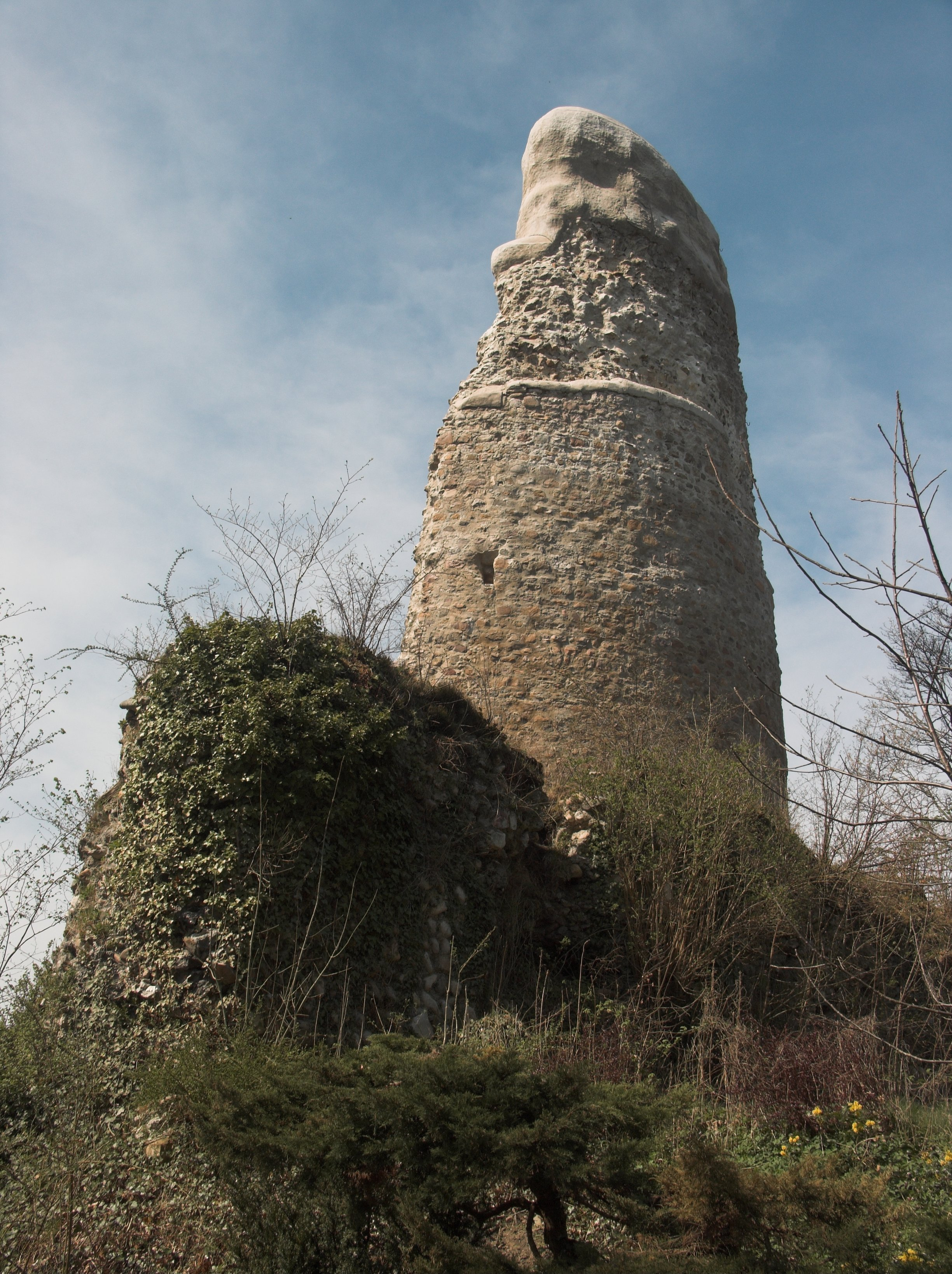
Castle ruins

In the environs of Osterode there are several castle ruins, and Lichtenstein Castle between Dorste and Förste.

The town granary built between 1719 and 1722 is one of the most imposing buildings, built to supply the mining villages in the Upper Harz with grain. Today after a comprehensive renovation it has become the town hall. It is decorated with a bas-relief featuring the 18th-century coat of arms of Great Britain.

=== Recreation ===
Osterode is the starting point of the 100 km long Harzer Hexenstieg, a hiking trail to Thale.

== Transport ==
The B 243 federal route, built as a divided highway, is the main western link between the northern and southern Harz area. B 241 and B 498 link Solling to the eastern Harz.

Osterode lies on the Herzberg–Seesen railway, with services to Brunswick. In November 2004 the town gained two new stations at a cost of about 1 million Euro, replacing two previous halts and providing a more central access to public transport.

== Educational institutions ==
- Tilman-Riemenschneider-Gymnasium (high school), Osterode am Harz
- Berufsbildende Schulen I des Landkreises Osterode am Harz
- Berufsbildende Schulen II
- Realschule Osterode
- Hauptschule Neustädter Tor

== Twin towns – sister cities ==
Osterode am Harz is twinned with:

- Armentières, France; one of the bridges over the Söse is called "Armentieres Bridge"
- Ostróda, Poland
- Scarborough, United Kingdom
- Whitby, United Kingdom

== Notable people ==
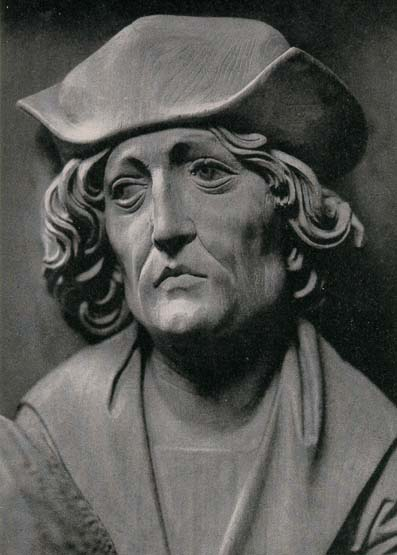
Tilman Riemenschneider

- Tilman Riemenschneider (1460–1531), sculptor and artist, brought up locally.
- Andreas Cludius, (DE Wiki) (1555–1624), legal scholar, professor
- George William Alberti (1723–1758), essayist and theologian.
- Friedrich (Fritz) Jorns, (DE Wiki) (1837–1910), Reichstag delegate (1893–1907), owner of the Osteroder Kupferhammer, died locally
- Paul Homeyer (1853–1908), concert organist
- Friedrich Rinne (1863–1933), mineralogist, crystallographer and petrographer.
- Otto Wernicke (1893–1965), actor from 1923 to 1959.
- Jochen Ulrich (1944–2012), choreographer and dancer.
- Renate Krößner (1945–2020), actress, with roles in films and television.
- Petra Emmerich-Kopatsch, (DE Wiki) (born 1960), politician (SPD)
- Marco Bode (born 1969), footballer, played 421 games for SV Werder Bremen and 40 for Germany
- Nico Lauenstein (born 1986), a football goalkeeper who has played over 280 games

== See also ==
- Metropolitan region Hannover-Braunschweig-Göttingen-Wolfsburg
