= Hartmut Haenchen =

German conductor

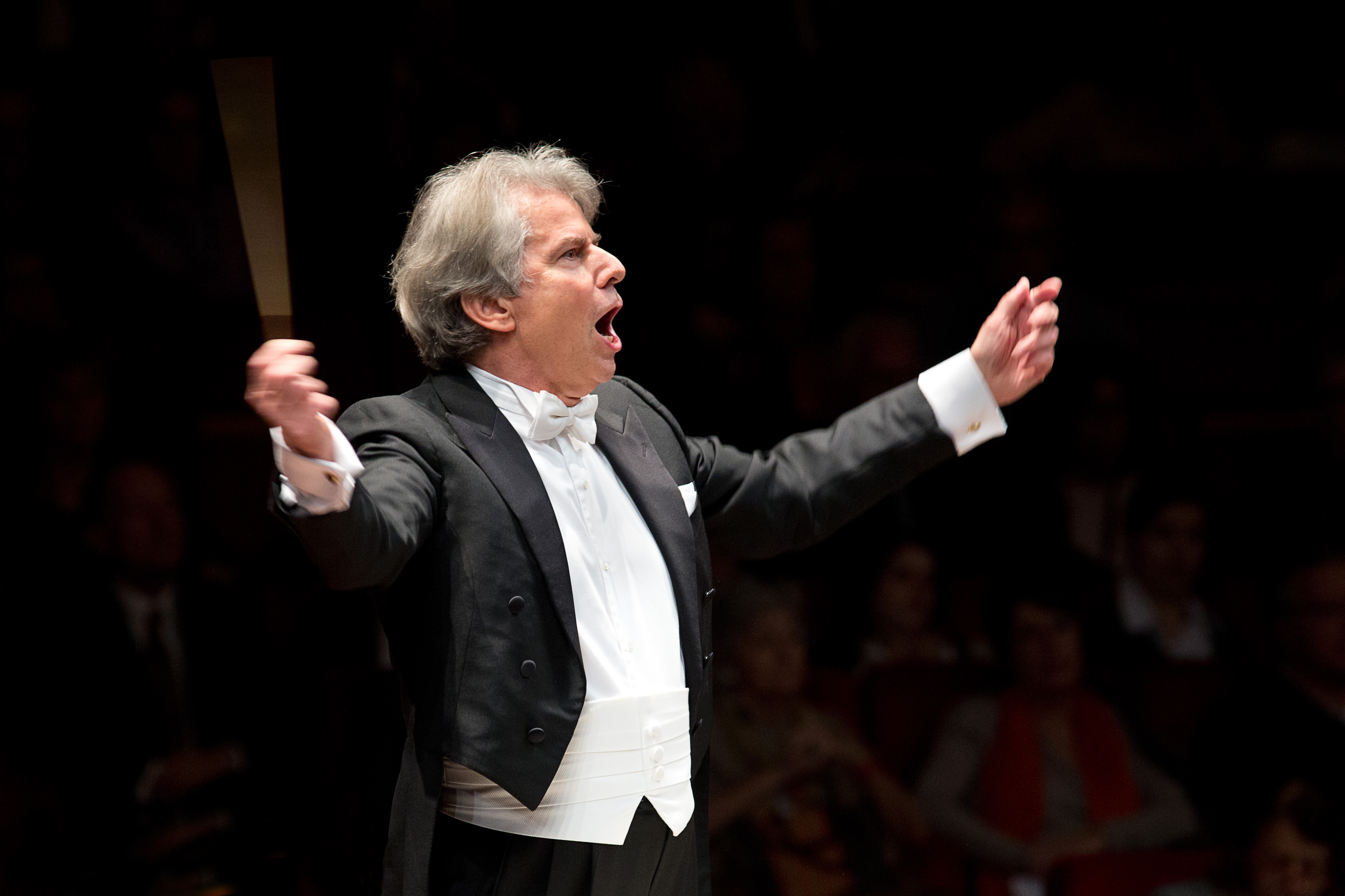
Hartmut Haenchen

Hartmut Haenchen (born 21 March 1943) is a German conductor, known as a specialist for the music of Carl Philipp Emanuel Bach, and for conducting operas in the leading opera houses of the world.

== Career ==
Born in Dresden, Haenchen began his musical career as a member of the Dresdner Kreuzchor. By the age of 15, he was already conducting performances as cantor. As a 17-year-old, he attracted widespread attention with his revival of Johann Adolph Hasse's Requiem. Haenchen subsequently studied conducting and voice at the Hochschule für Musik Carl Maria von Weber. He then attended master classes in Berlin, Leningrad and at Carinthian Summer Festival in Austria, later attending rehearsals at the Bayreuth Festival and concerts conducted by Herbert von Karajan.

Haenchen's first engagement was as director of the Robert-Franz-Singakademie (choral society) in Halle and conductor of the Halle Philharmonic Orchestra in 1966. He went on to win first prize at the Carl Maria von Weber Competition in Dresden in 1971. In 1972–1973 Haenchen served as principal Kapellmeister of the Zwickau Theatre. During that period he made his debut at the Berlin State Opera, directing Mussorgsky's Boris Godunov. He appeared there regularly until 1986.

From 1973 to 1976, Haenchen was conductor of the Dresden Philharmonic and a regular guest with the Semperoper. Between 1976 and 1979, he served as music director of the Mecklenburgische Staatskapelle and Staatstheater in Schwerin. Subsequently, he began to make regular appearances at Komische Oper Berlin. From 1980 to 2014 he was artistic director of the Carl Philipp Emanuel Bach Chamber Orchestra in Berlin.

In 1986, Haenchen became music director of the De Nederlandse Opera (DNO) in Amsterdam and chief conductor of the Netherlands Philharmonic Orchestra (NPO) and the Netherlands Chamber Orchestra. During his tenure in Amsterdam, DNO became renowned for its high-quality ensemble productions and innovative stagings. Haenchen was particularly associated with the German repertoire: Richard Strauss, Mozart, and Wagner, but he also conducted opera of Verdi, Bartók, Tchaikovsky, Puccini, and Gluck. After the 1999 Ring cycle, Haenchen left his post but has continued as a guest conductor. With the NPO, the newly formed Netherlands Philharmonic Orchestra quickly rose in stature, under his leadership, not only in its opera performances but also in symphonic concerts, recordings, and foreign tours. Haenchen resigned his position in September 2002 to protest budget cuts. However, he frequently returned to the NPO and was appointed as their honorary conductor in March 2023.

Haenchen has made guest appearances in virtually all the European countries and toured Japan, the United States and Canada. He has conducted operas in Amsterdam, Berlin, Bologna, Dresden, Geneva, Jerusalem, London, Madrid, Milan, Munich, New York City, Paris, Stuttgart, Warsaw, Vienna and the Hessisches Staatstheater Wiesbaden.

He was scheduled to conduct Parsifal at the Bayreuth Festival in the summer of 2016 and 2017.

== Awards ==
- 1984 Kunstpreis der DDR
- 1990/1992 Laurence Olivier Award (Gluck Orfeo ed Euridice and Mozart Mitridate, both Royal Opera House, London)
- 1996 Knight in the Order of the Dutch Lion
- 2008 Cross of the Order of Merit of the Federal Republic of Germany
- 2013 Honorary doctorate Hochschule für Musik Carl Maria von Weber
- 2017 The magazine Opernwelt has chosen on the basis of a vote of fifty journalists worldwide Haenchen as Conductor of the Year 2017.
- 2018 Richard Wagner Prize of the Richard Wagner Foundation Leipzig

== Discography ==
(chronological selection from 137 CDs/DVDs)

- Early classical horn concertos with Peter Damm, ETERNA, 1984, reissued by BERLIN Classics 0032102BC
- Friedrich II: Symphonies and flute concertos with Manfred Friedrich, ETERNA, 1984, CAPRICCIO 10064, 1985, featured record of the month
- Oboe concertos by Wolfgang Amadeus Mozart, Giuseppe Ferlendis and Franz Anton Rößler with Burkhard Glätzner, 1984, CAPRICCIO 10 087
- C.Ph.E. Bach: The Berlin Symphonies, 1985, CAPRICCIO 10103, awarded the Deutsche Schallplattenpreis
- C.Ph.E. Bach: Flute concertos with Eckart Haupt, 1985, CAPRICCIO 10104 und CAPRICCIO 10105, awarded the Deutsche Schallplattenpreis
- C.Ph.E. Bach: Organ concertos with Roland Münch, 1985, CAPRICCIO 10135, awarded the Deutsche Schallplattenpreis
- C.Ph.E. Bach: String symphonies Wq 182, 1985 CAPRICCIO 51 033, awarded the Deutsche Schallplattenpreis
- C.Ph.E. Bach: Four orchestral symphonies, 1986, CAPRICCIO 10175 awarded the Deutsche Schallplattenpreis, award winner in the magazine “Scala” as one of the best 50 recordings of the 20th century.
- Wolfgang Amadeus Mozart: Flute concertos with Werner Tast, 1987, ETERNA 7 28 022CD
- Georg Friedrich Händel: Arias with Jochen Kowalski, 1987, ETERNA 3 29 099, awarded the Deutsche Schallplattenpreis
- Joseph Haydn: Symphonies nos. 26, 44 & 49, 1988, BERLIN Classics 1013-2, CD of the year 1993, AVRO's Platenzaak
- Christoph Willibald Gluck: Orfeo ed Euridice, 1988, CAPRICCIO 60008-2, awarded the Deutsche Schallplattenpreis, Gramophone Award Nomination
- C.Ph.E. Bach: Magnificat and two Berlin Symphonies with Venceslava Hruba-Freiberger, Barbara Bornemann, Peter Schreier, Olaf Bär, 1988, BERLIN Classics 0110 011
- Joseph Haydn: Symphonies nos. 43, 45 & 59, 1989, BERLIN Classics 0110 014
- Joseph Haydn: Symphonies nos. 31, 73 & 82, 1989, BERLIN Classics BC 1028-2
- Wolfgang Amadeus Mozart: Sinfonia concertante KV 297b and Concerto for flute and harp with Werner Tast and Katharina Hanstedt, 1990, BERLIN Classics 0120 004
- Wolfgang Amadeus Mozart: Concertone and Sinfonia concertante KV 364 with Thorsten Rosenbusch, Christian Trompler and Erich Krüger, 1990, BERLIN Classics 0120 003
- Joseph Haydn: Symphonies nos. 48, 53 & 85, 1990, BERLIN Classics 0110 024
- Carl Maria von Weber: Symphony no. 1 C-Dur; Felix Mendelssohn Bartholdy: String symphony no. 10 in B minor; Hugo Wolf: Italian Serenade; Richard Wagner: Siegfried Idyll, 1991, Sony Classical SK 53109
- Concert at the Prussia court with Thorsten Rosenbusch, Erich Krüger, Christian Trompler, Karl-Heinz Schröter, Christine Schornsheim, Klaus Kirbach, 1991, BERLIN Classics 1040-2
- Joseph Haydn: Symphonies nos. 94, 103 & 60, 1991, BERLIN Classics 1027-2
- C.Ph.E. Bach: Symphony in D major; Wolfgang Amadeus Mozart: "Eine kleine Nachtmusik"; Johann Sebastian Bach: Brandenburg Concerto no. 3; Benjamin Britten: Simple Symphony; Georg Friedrich Händel: Water Music Suite no. 2, 1991, Sony Classical SK 4806
- Giovanni Pergolesi: Stabat mater with Dennis Naseband and Jochen Kowalski, 1992, BERLIN Classics BC 1047-2
- Gustav Mahler – String Quartet arrangements: Ludwig van Beethoven: String Quartet in F minor op. 95, Franz Schubert: String Quartet in D minor D 810 “Death and the Maiden", 1992, BERLIN Classics 0010642
- Italian and German Christmas Music, 1992, Sony Classical S2K 53266
- Water Music: Georg Friedrich Händel and Georg Philipp Telemann, 1992, BERLIN Classics 1051-2
- Wolfgang Amadeus Mozart: Concert arias with Christiane Oelze, 1993, BERLIN Classics 0013252BC, awarded the Deutsche Schallplattenpreis
- Joseph Haydn: Symphonies nos. 22, 55 & 64, 1993, BERLIN Classics 0011092BC
- Wilhelm Friedemann Bach: The orchestral works, 1993, BERLIN Classics B001FY2KVW
- Pietro Locatelli: Concerti grossi Op. 7, 1994, BERLIN Classics 0011332BC
- Johann Sebastian Bach: Cantatas 35, 169 & 49 with Jochen Kowalski and Raphael Alpermann, 1994, BERLIN Classics 0011322BC
- C.Ph. E. Bach: Die letzten Leiden des Erlösers with Christine Schäfer, Ellen Schuring, Thomas Dewald, Roman Trekel and the Hallenser Madrigalisten, 1994, DVD: EuroArts 2060808
- Felix Mendelssohn-Bartholdy, Symphony No. 3 (Mendelssohn), and Hebrides Overture – Fingal's Cave ca. 1988, Berlin Classics.
- Johann Christian Bach: Symphony in G minor op. 6, no. 6; Wolfgang Amadeus Mozart: Symphony no. 40 in G minor KV 550 (1st version); Franz Schubert: Symphony no. 5 in B flat major, 1995, SONY Classical SMK 93831
- Franz Liszt: Dante Sinfonie, CAPRICCIO 10 736, 1995
- Cello concertos of the 18th century by C.Ph.E. Bach (A major), Nicola Porpora (G major), Joseph Haydn (no. 2 in D major) with Jens Peter Maintz, 1996, PHILIPS 456015-2
- Richard Wagner: Der Ring des Nibelungen, 1999, OPUSARTE
- Gustav Mahler: Symphony no. 5, 2001, PENTATON, SACD PTC 5 186 004
- Gustav Mahler: Symphony no.1 and 8, 2002, ICA (ICAC 5094)
- Johann David Heinichen: La Gara degli Dei with Alexandra Coku, Carola Höhn, Simone Nold, Katharina Kammerloher, Annette Markert, Ralph Eschrig, Olaf Bär, 2003, Berlin Classics 0300544BC
- Classical Violin concertos. Works by W.A. Mozart (Rondo in C major KV 373, Concerto in G major KV 216), M. Haydn (Concerto in B flat major), F. Schubert (Rondo in A major D 438) with Baiba Skride, 2004, Sony Classical 92939
- Wolfgang Amadeus Mozart: Divertimento in E flat major KV 113, Piano concerto in D minor, with Stefan Vladar, Symphony no. 41 in C major (Jupiter), 2005, DVD EuroArts 2055088
- Wolfgang Amadeus Mozart Discovering Masterpieces: Jupiter Symphony with an introduction by Hartmut Haenchen, 2006, DVD EuroArts 2056018
- Richard Wagner: Der Ring des Nibelungen, 2006, ET'CETERA KTC5504
- Gustav Mahler: Symphonie no. 6, DVD, ICAD 5018, 2009, Diapason d'Or
- Richard Wagner: Der fliegende Holländer, DNO, 2010, OPUS ARTE, 4947487
- Richard Wagner: Parsifal, director: Romeo Castellucci, 2011, DVD BelAir, MEILLEURE DIFFUSION MUSICALE AUDIOVISUELLE
- C.Ph.E. Bach: Die letzten Leiden des Erlösers with Christina Landshamer, Christiane Oelze, Anke Vondung, Maximilian Schmitt, Roman Trekel and RIAS-Kammerchor, 2014, BERLIN Classics 0300575BC
- Wolfgang Amadeus Mozart: Symphonies nos. 39, 40 & 41, 2014, BERLIN Classics 0300587BC
- Richard Wagner: Parsifal, 2016, DVD, Deutsche Grammophone 004400735350
- Anton Bruckner: Symphonie no. 8, CD, Genuin 18622, 2017

== Books ==
- Hartmut Haenchen "Werktreue und Interpretation", Pfau-Verlag Saarbrücken 2013, 2. Auflage 2016, Band 1 ISBN 978-3-89727-499-0, Band 2 ISBN 978-3-89727-500-3, als Schuber ISBN 978-3-89727-501-0
- Texte von Hartmut Haenchen
- Hartmut Haenchen: Gustav Mahlers fiktive Briefe, 14 volumes, Pfau-Verlag
- Hartmut Haenchen: Bibliographie
- Hartmut Haenchen: Von der Unvereinbarkeit von Macht und Liebe, Anmerkungen zu Wagners Der Ring des Nibelungen, DNO AMSTERDAM, 1990, 93 pages, ISBN 90-5082-111-1

== Exhibition ==
- Grenzüberschreitungen – Vom Dresdner Kreuzchor zur Mailänder Scala, Report about the opening of the exhibition in the Sächsische Landes- und Universitätsbibliothek

Cultural offices
Preceded by Hans Vonk	Chief Conductor, Dutch National Opera; 1986–1999	Succeeded by Edo de Waart
Preceded by (no predecessor)	Chief Conductor, Netherlands Philharmonic Orchestra; 1985–2002	Succeeded by Yakov Kreizberg
