= Carl Philipp Emanuel Bach Chamber Orchestra =

German chamber orchestra, active 1969–2014

Kammerorchester Carl Philipp Emanuel Bach
- Orchestra
- Founded: 1969
- Disbanded: 2014
- Concert hall: Konzerthaus Berlin, Philharmonie Berlin
- Principal conductor: Hartmut Haenchen

The Carl Philipp Emanuel Bach Chamber Orchestra (German: Kammerorchester Carl Philipp Emanuel Bach) was a German chamber orchestra, founded in 1969 in Berlin, dedicated to the music of Carl Philipp Emanuel Bach and his contemporaries.

== History ==
What was to become the Carl Philipp Emanuel Bach Chamber Orchestra was formed comprising members of the Staatskapelle Berlin in 1969 by composer Jean Kurt Forest with the support of the general manager of the Staatsoper Hans Pischner, with the aim of performing contemporary music. Jean Kurt Forest was succeeded as artistic director by Dieter-Gerhard Worm.

In 1980, following the initial collaboration with Hartmut Haenchen and then his appointment as artistic director, this specialist modern music orchestra changed its profile to concentrate on early classical repertoire, in particular that of the composer it was named after and his contemporaries. The reason for this change was state regulation by the East German government, which exerted influence on which contemporary works should be played. From these experiences arose the idea of searching for rediscoveries in Berlin musical history and of naming Carl Philipp Emanuel Bach, Friedrich the Great's court harpsichordist, the ensemble's patron.

By the 1980s, Carl Philipp Emanuel Bach, whose music belongs to the avant-garde of the 18th century, had been virtually forgotten. The orchestra's extensive recordings of C.P.E. Bach's works, many of them first recordings, were distinguished with numerous prizes. The C.P.E. Bach Chamber Orchestra held a special place in Berlin's musical life as "a point of reference for excellence of quality and unmistakable style" (Berliner Zeitung). There followed tours and invitations to festivals, and the chamber orchestra was a guest in Japan, Italy, Austria (Salzburg Festival, Vienna Musikwochen), the Netherlands, Spain, Poland and Switzerland, as well as at Germany's most important music festivals, such as the Brandenburgischer Musiksommer, the Dresdner Musikfestspiele, the Ludwigsburger Schlossfestspiele, the Mozartfest Würzburg, the Schleswig-Holstein Music Festival, the Schwetzinger Festspiele and the Festspiele Mecklenburg-Vorpommern. It performed with world-famous soloists including Dietrich Fischer-Dieskau, Anne-Sophie Mutter, Deborah Polaski, Sviatoslav Richter, Christine Schäfer and Frank Peter Zimmermann, as well as with Peter Schreier as singer and conductor. TV productions, radio broadcasts and 62 CDs and DVDs document the artistic quality of the ensemble.

The chamber orchestra continually extended its repertoire from the Baroque to Classical, Romantic and modern classics, dedicating itself as much to Richard Strauss and Dmitri Shostakovich as to Schubert, Mozart and in particular to Joseph Haydn. The heart of the work of the chamber orchestra, which consisted of 25 musicians (strings and wind) from Berlin's top orchestras, and of artistic director, was its own concert series, established in 1984, with 5 concerts per season in the Chamber Music Hall of the Berlin Philharmonie and the Great Hall of the Berlin Konzerthaus. Numerous rediscoveries, particularly works from the Berlin-Brandenburg musical tradition, were given their first performances in modern times in this concert series. The economic independence of this series was a financial and organisational challenge, which the orchestra overcame every year without public funding, as all involved waived their artists' fees. In 2014 the chamber orchestra looked back on 45 years of musical and contemporary history to celebrate a 34-year collaboration with Hartmut Haenchen. On 1 May 2014 the orchestra was disbanded and ceased its concert activity.

== The style of the chamber orchestra ==
Under the artistic direction of Hartmut Haenchen, a specific understanding of music, musico-structural analysis and virtuosity characterised the ensemble's successful interpretations. "The orchestra plays on modern instruments, without ignoring current historical performance practice. This results in remarkably intense and lively performances, which are deeply rooted in the score rather than amounting to nothing more than superficial pseudo-historical sound" (FonoForum). Alertness and agility distinguished the ensemble's concerts and recordings, "finely graded agogic nuances, precise assessment and moderate use of tonal space, controlled expressivity" (Berliner Zeitung) renders them unmistakable. While preparing the musical scores, Hartmut Haenchen referred to a knowledge resource of more than 200 theoretical texts from the 16th to 18th centuries. However, this was not to recreate an "authentic" performance, which many argue cannot exist in modern performance, but to create one of many possible interpretations according to stylistic insight. In order to present the intentions of a historical composition today with meaning, the interpretations concentrated on issues and statements that one can relate to today.

== Discography ==
Chronological selection, Catalogue numbers refer to the first CD edition

Recordings under Hartmut Haenchen

- Early classical horn concertos with Peter Damm, 1981, BERLIN Classics 0032102BC
- Friedrich II: Symphonies and flute concertos with Manfred Friedrich, 1982, CAPRICCIO 10064, featured record of the month
- Oboe concertos by Wolfgang Amadeus Mozart, Giuseppe Ferlendis and Franz Anton Rößler with Burkhard Glätzner, 1984, CAPRICCIO 10 087
- C.Ph.E. Bach: The Berlin Symphonies, 1985, CAPRICCIO 10103, awarded the Deutsche Schallplattenpreis
- C.Ph.E. Bach: Flute concertos with Eckart Haupt, 1985, CAPRICCIO 10104 und CAPRICCIO 10105, awarded the Deutsche Schallplattenpreis
- C.Ph.E. Bach: Organ concertos with Roland Münch, 1985, CAPRICCIO 10135, awarded the Deutsche Schallplattenpreis
- C.Ph.E. Bach: String symphonies Wq 182, 1985 CAPRICCIO 51 033, awarded the Deutsche Schallplattenpreis
- C.Ph.E. Bach: Four orchestral symphonies, 1986, CAPRICCIO 10175 awarded the Deutsche Schallplattenpreis, award winner in the magazine "Scala" as one of the best 50 recordings of the 20th century.
- Wolfgang Amadeus Mozart: Flute concertos with Werner Tast, 1987, ETERNA 7 28 022CD
- Georg Friedrich Händel: Arias with Jochen Kowalski, 1987, ETERNA 3 29 099, awarded the Deutsche Schallplattenpreis
- Joseph Haydn: Symphonies nos. 26, 44 & 49, 1988, BERLIN Classics 1013-2, CD of the year 1993, AVRO's Platenzaak
- Christoph Willibald Gluck: Orfeo ed Euridice, 1988, CAPRICCIO 60008-2, awarded the Deutsche Schallplattenpreis, Gramophone Award Nomination
- C.Ph.E. Bach: Magnificat and two Berlin Symphonies with Venceslava Hruba-Freiberger, Barbara Bornemann, Peter Schreier, Olaf Bär, 1988, BERLIN Classics 0110 011
- Joseph Haydn: Symphonies nos. 43, 45 & 59, 1989, BERLIN Classics 0110 014
- Joseph Haydn: Symphonies nos. 31, 73 & 82, 1989, BERLIN Classics BC 1028-2
- Wolfgang Amadeus Mozart: Sinfonia concertante KV 297b and Concerto for flute and harp with Werner Tast and Katharina Hanstedt, 1990, BERLIN Classics 0120 004
- Wolfgang Amadeus Mozart: Concertone and Sinfonia concertante KV 364 with Thorsten Rosenbusch, Christian Trompler and Erich Krüger, 1990, BERLIN Classics 0120 003
- Joseph Haydn: Symphonies nos. 48, 53 & 85, 1990, BERLIN Classics 0110 024
- Carl Maria von Weber: Symphony no. 1 C-Dur; Felix Mendelssohn Bartholdy: String symphony no. 10 in B minor; Hugo Wolf: Italian Serenade; Richard Wagner: Siegfried Idyll, 1991, Sony Classical SK 53109
- Concert at the Prussia court with Thorsten Rosenbusch, Erich Krüger, Christian Trompler, Karl-Heinz Schröter, Christine Schornsheim, Klaus Kirbach, 1991, BERLIN Classics 1040-2
- Joseph Haydn: Symphonies nos. 94, 103 & 60, 1991, BERLIN Classics 1027-2
- C.Ph.E. Bach: Symphony in D major; Wolfgang Amadeus Mozart: "Eine kleine Nachtmusik"; Johann Sebastian Bach: Brandenburg Concerto no. 3; Benjamin Britten: Simple Symphony; Georg Friedrich Händel: Water Music Suite no. 2, 1991, Sony Classical SK 4806
- Giovanni Pergolesi: "Stabat mater" with Dennis Naseband and Jochen Kowalski, 1992, BERLIN Classics BC 1047-2
- Gustav Mahler – String Quartet arrangements: Ludwig van Beethoven: String Quartet in F minor op. 95, Franz Schubert: String Quartet in D minor D 810 "Death and the Maiden", 1992, BERLIN Classics 0010642
- Italian and German Christmas Music, 1992, Sony Classical S2K 53266
- Water Music: Georg Friedrich Händel and Georg Philipp Telemann, 1992, BERLIN Classics 1051-2
- Wolfgang Amadeus Mozart: Concert arias with Christiane Oelze, 1993, BERLIN Classics 0013252BC, awarded the Deutsche Schallplattenpreis
- Joseph Haydn: Symphonies nos. 22, 55 & 64, 1993, BERLIN Classics 0011092BC
- Wilhelm Friedemann Bach: The orchestral works, 1993, BERLIN Classics B001FY2KVW
- Pietro Locatelli: Concerti grossi Op. 7, 1994, BERLIN Classics 0011332BC
- Johann Sebastian Bach: Cantatas 35, 169 & 49 with Jochen Kowalski and Raphael Alpermann, 1994, BERLIN Classics 0011322BC
- C.Ph. E. Bach: "Die letzten Leiden des Erlösers" with Christine Schäfer, Ellen Schuring, Thomas Dewald, Roman Trekel and the Hallenser Madrigalisten, 1994, DVD: EuroArts 2060808
- Johann Christian Bach: Symphony in G minor op. 6, no. 6; Wolfgang Amadeus Mozart: Symphony no. 40 in G minor KV 550 (1st version); Franz Schubert: Symphony no. 5 in B flat major, 1995, SONY Classical SMK 93831
- Cello concertos of the 18th century by C.Ph.E. Bach (A major), Nicola Porpora (G major), Joseph Haydn (no. 2 in D major) with Jens Peter Maintz, 1996, PHILIPS 456015-2
- Johann David Heinichen: "La Gara degli Dei" with Alexandra Coku, Carola Höhn, Simone Nold, Katharina Kammerloher, Carola Höhn, Annette Markert, Ralph Eschrig, Olaf Bär, 2003, Berlin Classics 0300544BC
- Classical Violin concertos. Works by W.A. Mozart (Rondo in C major KV 373, Concerto in G major KV 216), M. Haydn (Concerto in B flat major), F. Schubert (Rondo in A major D 438) with Baiba Skride, 2004, Sony Classical 92939
- Wolfgang Amadeus Mozart: Divertimento in E flat major KV 113, Piano concerto in D minor, with Stefan Vladar, Symphony no. 41 in C major (Jupiter), 2005, DVD EuroArts 2055088
- Wolfgang Amadeus Mozart Discovering Masterpieces: Jupiter Symphony with an introduction by Hartmut Haenchen, 2006, DVD EuroArts 2056018
- C.Ph.E. Bach: "Die letzten Leiden des Erlösers" with Christina Landshamer, Christiane Oelze, Anke Vondung, Maximilian Schmitt, Roman Trekel and RIAS-Kammerchor, 2014, BERLIN Classics 0300575BC
- Wolfgang Amadeus Mozart: Symphonies nos. 39, 40 & 41, 2014, BERLIN Classics 0300587BC

Recordings under Peter Schreier

- Johann Sebastian Bach: The four orchestral suites,1986; PHILIPS
- Johann Sebastian Bach: The Brandenburg concertos, 1986, PHILIPS
- Johann Sebastian Bach: Magnificat, 1987, PHILIPS
- Johann Sebastian Bach: Masses, 1989, PHILIPS
- Johann Sebastian Bach: Cantatas 51, 82, 202 & 208 with Barbara Hendricks, 1990, EMI
- Wolfgang Amadeus Mozart: "La finta semplice", "L'oca del Cairo",1991, PHILIPS
- Early classical flute concertos with Patrick Gallois, 1992, Deutsche Grammophon

== Books ==
- Hartmut Haenchen "Werktreue und Interpretation", Pfau-Verlag Saarbrücken 2013, 2. Auflage 2015, Band 1 ISBN 978-3-89727-499-0, Band 2 ISBN 978-3-89727-500-3, als Schuber ISBN 978-3-89727-501-0
