= Skride =

Skride is a surname. Notable people with the surname include:

- Baiba Skride (born 1981), Latvian classical violinist
- Lauma Skride (born 1982), Latvian pianist
