= Hando (disambiguation) =

Hando is an island of the Southern Red Sea Region of Eritrea.

Hando may also refer to:

- Hando (given name), a forename of Estonian origin
- a fictional character in the 1992 film Romper Stomper
- Arthur Hando (1891-1949), Australian rules footballer
- Fred Hando (1888-1970), Welsh writer
- Robert Hando (born 1944), Australian rules footballer
- Tünde Handó (born 1962), Hungarian jurist and judge
