= Eurovision Young Musicians 1998 =

International youth classical music contest

Dates and venue
- Semi-final: 2 June 1998
- Final: 4 June 1998
- Venue: Konzerthaus; Vienna, Austria

Organisation
- Organiser: European Broadcasting Union (EBU)
- Host broadcaster: Österreichischer Rundfunk (ORF)
- Musical director: Dennis Russell Davies
- Presenter: Julian Rachlin

Participants
- Number of entries: 18
- Number of finalists: 8
- Debuting countries: Slovakia
- Returning countries: Croatia; Sweden
- Non-returning countries: Belgium; France; Russia
- Participation map: Finalist countries Countries eliminated in the preliminary round Countries that participated in the past but not in 1998

Vote
- Voting system: Jury chose their top 3 favourites by vote.
- Winning musician: Austria; Lidia Baich

Eurovision Young Musicians 1998 was the 9th edition of Eurovision Young Musicians. It consisted of a semi-final on 2 June and a final on 4 June 1998, held at Konzerthaus in Vienna, Austria, and presented by Julian Rachlin. It was organised by the European Broadcasting Union (EBU) and host broadcaster Österreichischer Rundfunk (ORF). The Vienna Radio Symphony Orchestra conducted by Dennis Russell Davies accompanied all competing performers. ORF had previously hosted the contest in Austria in 1990.

Musicians representing eighteen countries took part in the competition, with eight of them participating in the televised final. Slovakia made their début, while Croatia and Sweden returned to the contest. Three countries withdrew from the 1998 contest; they were Belgium, France, and Russia.

The winner was violinist Lidia Baich representing Austria, with cellist Monika Leskovar representing Croatia placing second, and percussionist Adrian Spillett representing the United Kingdom placing third. Baich had represented Austria at the previous edition in 1996, placing second.

== Location ==
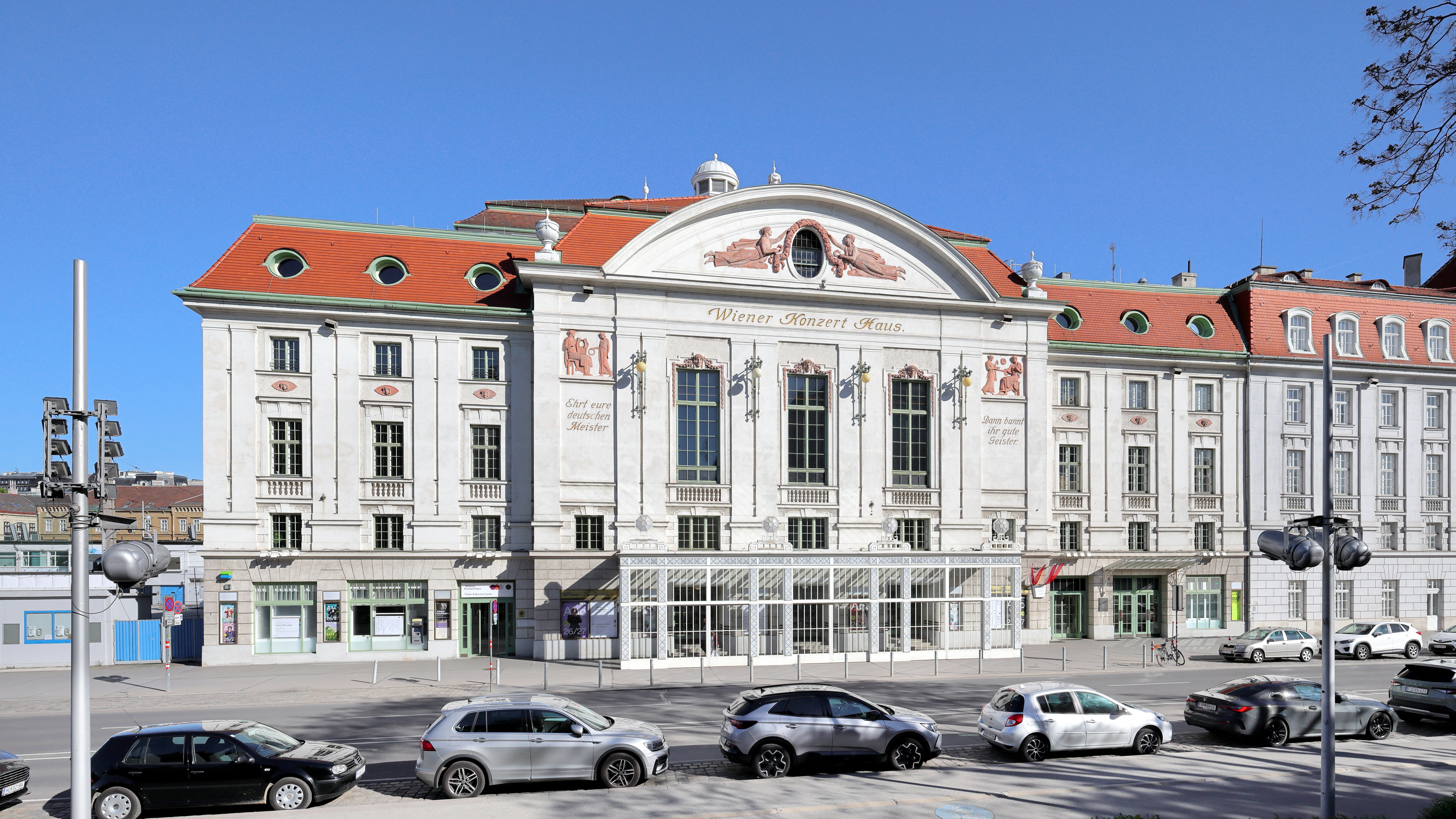
Konzerthaus, Vienna. Venue of Eurovision Young Musicians 1998.

The Konzerthaus, a concert hall in Vienna, Austria, was the host venue for the 1998 edition of Eurovision Young Musicians. Opened in 1913, it is situated in the third district just at the edge of the first district in Vienna. Since it was founded it has always tried to emphasise both tradition and innovative musical styles.

The Konzerthaus has the Vienna Symphony, the Vienna Chamber Orchestra, the Wiener Singakademie and the Klangforum Wien in residence. Several subscriptions also include concerts by the Vienna Philharmonic and other organizations.

== Format ==
Julian Rachlin was the host of the 1998 contest and performed during the interval.

== Participants and results ==
=== Preliminary round ===
Broadcasters from eighteen countries took part in the preliminary round of the 1998 contest, of which eight qualified to the televised grand final. The official list of performers in the preliminary round is unknown. The following countries failed to qualify as noted in the booklet of the official compilation album.

Country	Broadcaster	Performer	Instrument
Cyprus	CyBC	Nicolas Melis	Piano
Estonia	ETV	Hando Nahkur	Piano
Germany	ZDF	Korbinian Altenberger	Violin
Greece	ERT	Unknown	
Ireland	RTÉ	Cora Venus Lunny	Violin
Norway	NRK	Kristian Lindberg	Violin
Poland	TVP	Unknown	
Portugal	RTP	Unknown	
Spain	TVE	Leticia Moreno	Violin
Switzerland	SRG SSR	Francesco Piemontesi	Piano

=== Final ===
Awards were given to the top three participants. The table below highlights these using gold, silver, and bronze. The placing results of the remaining participants is unknown and never made public by the European Broadcasting Union.

Participants and results
R/O	Country	Broadcaster	Performer(s)	Instrument	Piece(s)	Composer(s)	Pl.
1	United Kingdom	BBC	Adrian Spillett	Percussion	Concerto for Percussion and Orchestra, 3rd Mov.	Joseph Schwantner	3
2	Finland	YLE	Kalle Toivio	Piano	Piano Concerto No. 2, 1st Mov.	Sergei Prokofiev	
3	Latvia	LTV	Lauma Skride	Piano	Piano Concerto No. 2, 3rd Mov.	Camille Saint-Saens	
4	Slovenia	RTVSLO	Borut Zagoranski	Accordion	Concierto para bandoneon presto	Astor Piazzolla	
5	Slovakia	STV	Michal Sťahel	Cello	Concerto for Violoncello and Orchestra, adagio	Edward Elgar	
6	Austria	ORF	Lidia Baich	Violin	Violin Concerto no. 5, 1st Mov.	Henri Vieuxtemps	1
7	Croatia	HRT	Monika Leskovar	Cello	Concerto for Violoncello and Orchestra, adagio	Edward Elgar	2
8	Sweden	SVT	David Sjögren	Violin	Violin Concerto, 3rd Mov.	Peter Tchaikovsky	

== Jury members ==
The jury members consisted of the following:

- United States – Yehudi Menuhin (head)
- Ukraine – Vadim Brodski
- France – Gérard Caussé
- Unknown – Friedrich Doligal
- Slovakia – Jack Martin Händler
- Georgia – Nana Yashvili
- Unknown – Eric Kushner
- Russia – Alexei Lyubimov

== Broadcasting ==
EBU members from the following countries broadcast the final round. Known details on the broadcasts in each country, including the specific broadcasting stations and commentators are shown in the tables below.

Broadcasters in participating countries
Country	Broadcaster	Channel(s)	Commentator(s)	Ref(s)
Austria	ORF	ORF 2 (Note: Deferred broadcast in a shortened format on 7 June at 09:05 (CET))	Otto Brusatti	
Croatia	HRT			
Cyprus	CyBC			
Estonia	ETV		Eero Raun	
Finland	YLE	TV1		
Germany	3sat			
Germany	ZDF (Note: The contest was summarised in an edition of ...und morgen Weltstar? broadcast on 15 June at 00:00 (CET))			
Greece	ERT			
Ireland	RTÉ			
Latvia	LTV	LTV1 (Note: Delayed broadcast on 6 June at 21:20 (EEST))		
Norway	NRK	NRK1 (Note: Deferred broadcast on 7 June at 21:45 (CET))		
Poland	TVP	TVP2		
Portugal	RTP			
Slovakia	STV	STV2 (Note: Deferred broadcast on 6 June at 21:45 (CEST))		
Slovenia	RTVSLO			
Spain	TVE			
Sweden	SVT	SVT1 (Note: Delayed broadcast on 8 August at 21:15 CET (20:15 UTC))	Marianne Söderberg	
Switzerland	SRG SSR	SF2		
Switzerland	SRG SSR	TSR 2	Jean-Pierre Pastori	
United Kingdom	BBC	BBC Two (Note: Delayed broadcast on 14 June at 17:15 (BST))	Stephanie Hughes	

Broadcasters and commentators in non-participating countries
Country	Broadcaster	Channel(s)	Commentator(s)	Ref(s)
Belgium	RTBF	La Deux		
Canada	TV5	TV5 Québec Canada (Note: Deferred broadcast on 28 June at 20:00 (EDT))		
France	France Télévision	France 3 (Note: Delayed broadcast in a shortened format; two finalists featured as part of the programme Nocturnales from 13–16 September 1999)		

== Official album ==
Eurovision Grand Prix For Young Musicians

Compilation album by Eurovision Young Musicians
- Released: 1998
- Recorded: June 1998
- Venues: Großer Saal, Konzerthaus, Vienna
- Genre: Classical
- Labels: ORF, Casinos Austria Classic
- Producer: Raimund Langner

Eurovision Grand Prix For Young Musicians was the official compilation album of the ninth edition of the contest, put together by the European Broadcasting Union and released by the host broadcaster ORF shortly after the contest in June 1998. The album featured live recordings of the eight finalists.

== See also ==
- Eurovision Song Contest 1998
