= Baiba Skride =

Latvian violinist

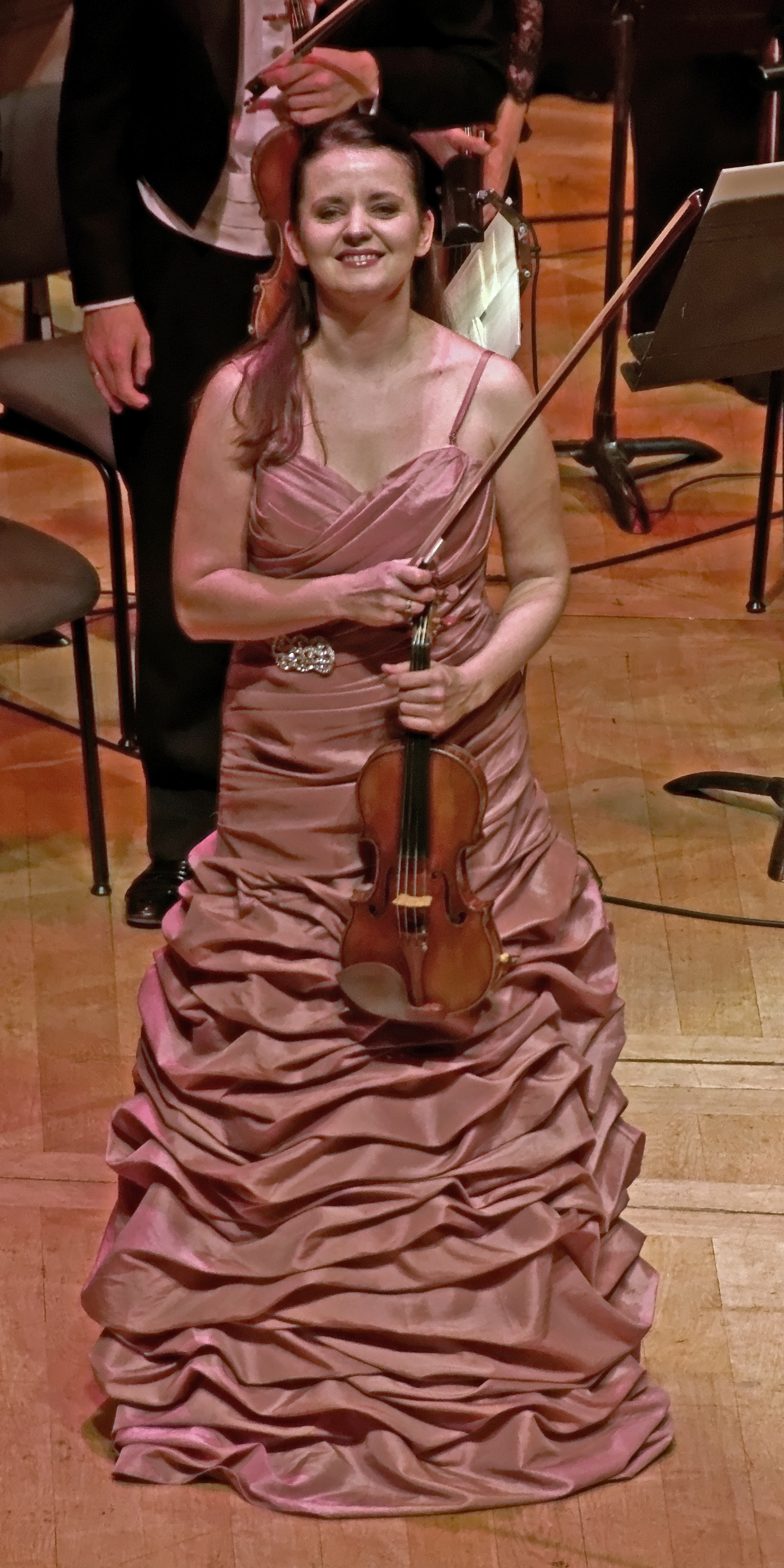

Background information
- Born: 19 February 1981 (age 44)
- Origin: Rīga, Latvian SSR
- Genres: Classical music
- Occupation: violinist
- Years active: 1990s–

Baiba Skride (born 19 February 1981) is a Latvian classical violinist. She was the winner of the Queen Elisabeth Violin Contest in 2001.

== Background and studies ==
Baiba Skride comes from a very musical Latvian family: her love of music comes from her grandmother who taught her and her two sisters to sing. Her father was a famous choral conductor, and her mother plays the piano. Her sister Lauma Skride, one year younger, also plays the piano, while her two-year-older sister Linda plays the viola. In Latvia, as a three-year-old she attended a music school. At the age of four, she was already playing the violin, and just before the age of five she gave her first concert.

Later, she attended a special school for musical talents in Riga. From 1995 she studied at the Conservatory of Music and Theatre in Rostock with Petru Munteanu. For a long time she commuted between the special school in Riga and the college in Rostock. She has taken masterclasses with Ruggiero Ricci and Lewis Kaplan.

Skride has performed around the world, including with the London Philharmonic Orchestra, and New Zealand Symphony Orchestra

== Instruments ==
Baiba Skride previously played the Stradivarius "Wilhelmj" violin (1725), which was on loan to her from the Nippon Music Foundation, and then the "Ex Baron Feilitzsch" Stradivarius violin (1734), which was loaned to her from Gidon Kremer. She now plays the Yfrah Neaman Stradivarius loaned to her by the Neaman family through the Beares International Violin Society. Her sisters are Lauma Skride, a pianist, and Linda Skride who plays viola.

== Awards ==
- 1995: 1st prize at the International Violin Competition in Schöntal Monastery
- 1996: finalist at the 8th Eurovision Competition in Lisbon
- 1997: 1st prize at the International Violin Competition "Jeunesses Musicales" in Bucharest
- 1998: 2nd prize at the Paganini Competition
- 2001: 1st prize at the Queen Elisabeth Competition for violin
- 2003: Luitpold Prize (German: Luitpoldpreis) of the festival Kissinger Sommer
- 2005: Echo Klassik, Best Young Artist Award for their debut CDs
- 2006: Echo Klassik in the category "Concert Recording of the Year, Music of the 20th/21st Centuries" for the recording of violin concertos by Shostakovich and Janáček

== Discography ==
Until 2008, Baiba Skride was under an exclusive contract with Sony. She took the place of Hilary Hahn, who had switched to Deutsche Grammophon. Since then she has collaborated with the music label Orfeo.

- 1998: "The Skride Sisters" – Works by Raimonds Pauls, Maurice Ravel, Johan Halvorsen, Eugène Ysaÿe, Johann Christian Bach, Emīls Dārziņš, Latvian Folk Song, Kurt Atterberg, Franz Liszt and Pablo de Sarasate with Linda Skride, Lauma Skride, Liga Skride and others (Higashikawa – Latvia Music Association)
- 2004: Works by Bach, Béla Bartók and Eugène Ysaÿe for violin solo (Sony Classical)
- 2004: Violin Concertos by Mozart, Michael Haydn and Franz Schubert with the Carl Philipp Emanuel Bach Chamber Orchestra under Hartmut Haenchen (Sony Classical)
- 2006: Violin Concertos by Shostakovich and Janáček with the Munich Philharmonic under Mikko Franck (Sony Classical)
- 2007: Works by Beethoven, Schubert and Ravel for violin and piano with Lauma Skride (Sony Classical)
- 2008: "Souvenir Russe" – Works by Tchaikovsky with the City of Birmingham Symphony Orchestra under Andris Nelsons (Sony Classical)
- 2011: Violin Concerto by Brahms with the Royal Stockholm Philharmonic Orchestra under Sakari Oramo; 21 Hungarian Dances by Brahms, arranged for violin and piano, with Lauma Skride (Orfeo)
- 2012: Violin Concertos by Stravinsky and Frank Martin, Pacific 231 and Rugby by Honegger, with the BBC National Orchestra of Wales under Thierry Fischer (Orfeo)
- 2013: Violin Concertos and Fantasy by Schumann with the Danish Radio Symphony Orchestra under John Storgårds (Orfeo)
- 2014: Szymanowski, Violin Concertos with the Oslo Philharmonic under Vassili Petrenko; Myths for violin and piano with Lauma Skride (Orfeo)
- 2015: Violin Concertos by Sibelius and Nielsen, two serenades by Sibelius, with the Tampere Philharmonic Orchestra under Santtu-Matias Rouvali (Orfeo)
- 2016: Sonatas and Pieces for Violin and Piano by Grieg, Nielsen, Sibelius and Stenhammar, with Lauma Skride (Orfeo)

== Personal life ==
As of 2010, she was living in Hamburg with her husband and 2-year-old son; by 2017, they had 2 children.
