= Hando (given name) =

Estonian male given name

- Gender: Male
- Language: Estonian
- Name day: 17 January

Origin
- Region of origin: Estonia

Hando an Estonian masculine given name.

As of 1 January 2021, 119 men in Estonia have the first name Hando, making it the 603rd most popular male name in the country. The name Hando is most commonly found in individuals in the 35-39 age range. The first name is the most commonly found in Järva County, where there 1.67 per 10,000 inhabitants of the county bear the name.

Individuals bearing the name Hando include:

- Hando Kask (born 1938), architect, playwright, director, poet and translator
- Hando Mugasto (1907–1937), artist
- Hando Nahkur (born 1982), pianist
- Hando Runnel (born 1938), poet
