= Scheden =

- Municipality
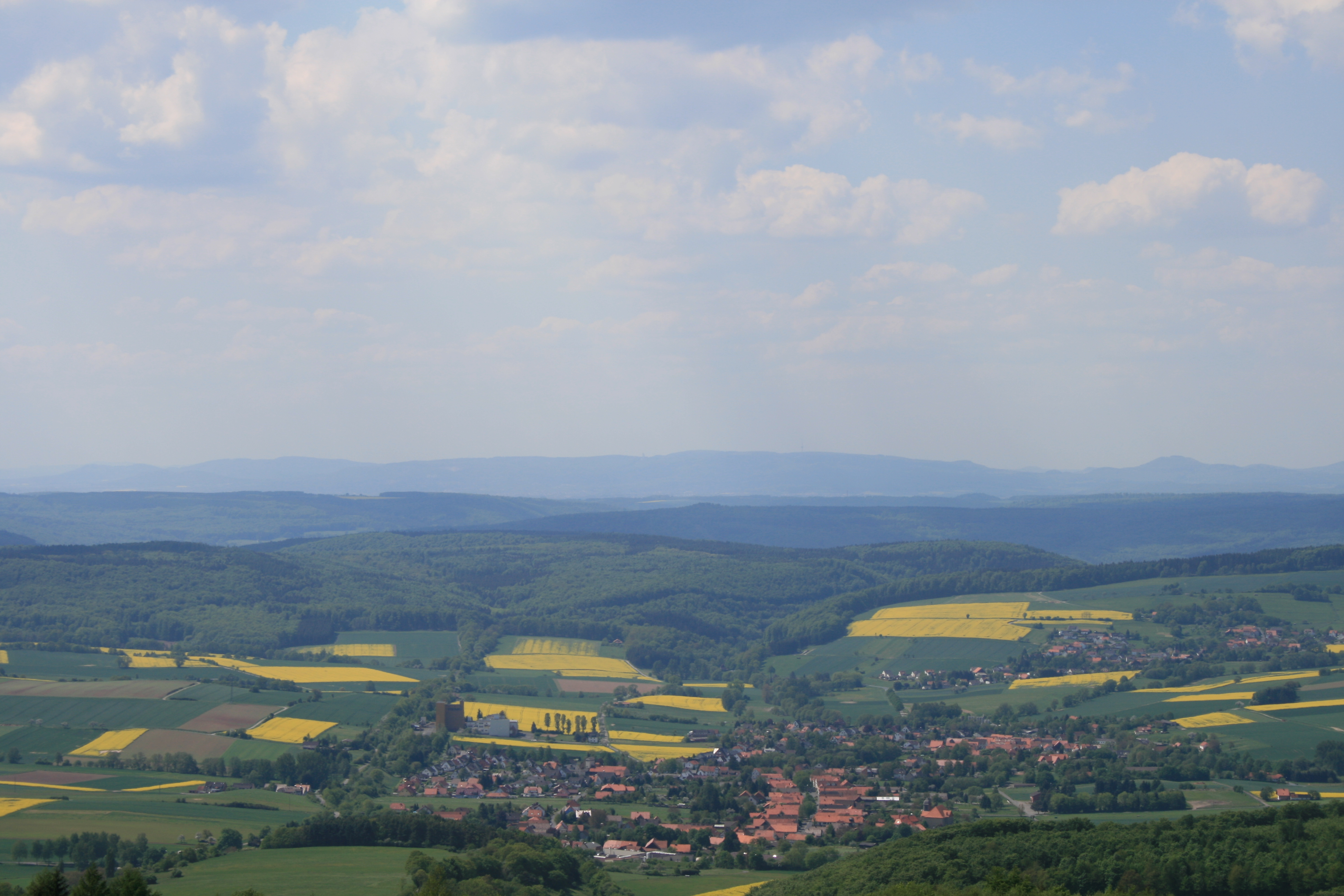

- Flag Coat of arms

- Location of Scheden within Göttingen district
- Interactive map of Scheden
- Location within Germany Location within Lower Saxony
- Coordinates: 51°27′N 09°44′E
- Country: Germany
- State: Lower Saxony
- District: Göttingen
- Municipal assoc.: Dransfeld
- Subdivisions: 3 Ortsteile

Government
  - Mayor: Ingrid Rüngeling

Area
  - Total: 26.69 km^{2} (10.31 sq mi)
- Elevation: 359 m (1,178 ft)

Population (2025-12-31)
  - Total: 1,792
  - Density: 67.14/km^{2} (173.9/sq mi)
- Time zone: UTC+01:00 (CET)
  - Summer (DST): UTC+02:00 (CEST)
- Postal codes: 37127
- Dialling codes: 05546
- Vehicle registration: GÖ
- Website: www.Scheden.de

Scheden is a village in the district of Göttingen, Lower Saxony, Germany. The commune of Scheden consists of the three villages: Scheden, Meensen, and Dankelshausen. The river Schede runs through the village. In 2020 the population was 1,871.

== Incorporations ==
The following communities were incorporated in the commune of Scheden:

- Dankelshausen
- Meensen

== People born in Scheden ==
- Johann Joachim Quantz was a flutist, flute maker, and composer, amongst others in the service of Frederick the Great.
- Senator Justus Christoph Grünewald, *1764 in Niederscheden. In 1801 the first communal savings and loan association of Germany was established on his suggestion.
