= Dransfeld (Samtgemeinde) =

Municipal community in Lower Saxony, Germany

- Samtgemeinde
- Coat of arms

- Location of Dransfeld within Göttingen district
- Interactive map of Dransfeld
- Location within Germany Location within Lower Saxony
- Coordinates: 51°30′N 9°46′E
- Country: Germany
- State: Lower Saxony
- District: Göttingen
- Seat: Dransfeld
- Subdivisions: 5 municipalities

Area
  - Total: 122.71 km^{2} (47.38 sq mi)

Population (2025-12-31)
  - Total: 8,867
  - Density: 72.26/km^{2} (187.2/sq mi)
- Time zone: UTC+01:00 (CET)
  - Summer (DST): UTC+02:00 (CEST)
- Website: www.dransfeld.de

Dransfeld is a Samtgemeinde ("collective municipality") in the district of Göttingen, in Lower Saxony, Germany. Its seat is in the town Dransfeld.

The Samtgemeinde Dransfeld consists of the following municipalities:

1. Bühren
2. Dransfeld
3. Jühnde
4. Niemetal
5. Scheden

== Coat of arms ==
The coat of arms shows a golden hill on black, a golden lion armed gules with raised right front paw, on the hill 12 linden leaves. The lion serves as a symbolic representation of the historical association with Braunschweig, while the golden hill represents the local landscape. The presence of the linden leaves corresponds to the number of communities present at the time of the establishment of the united community.
