= Johannes Jeep =

German organist, choirmaster and composer

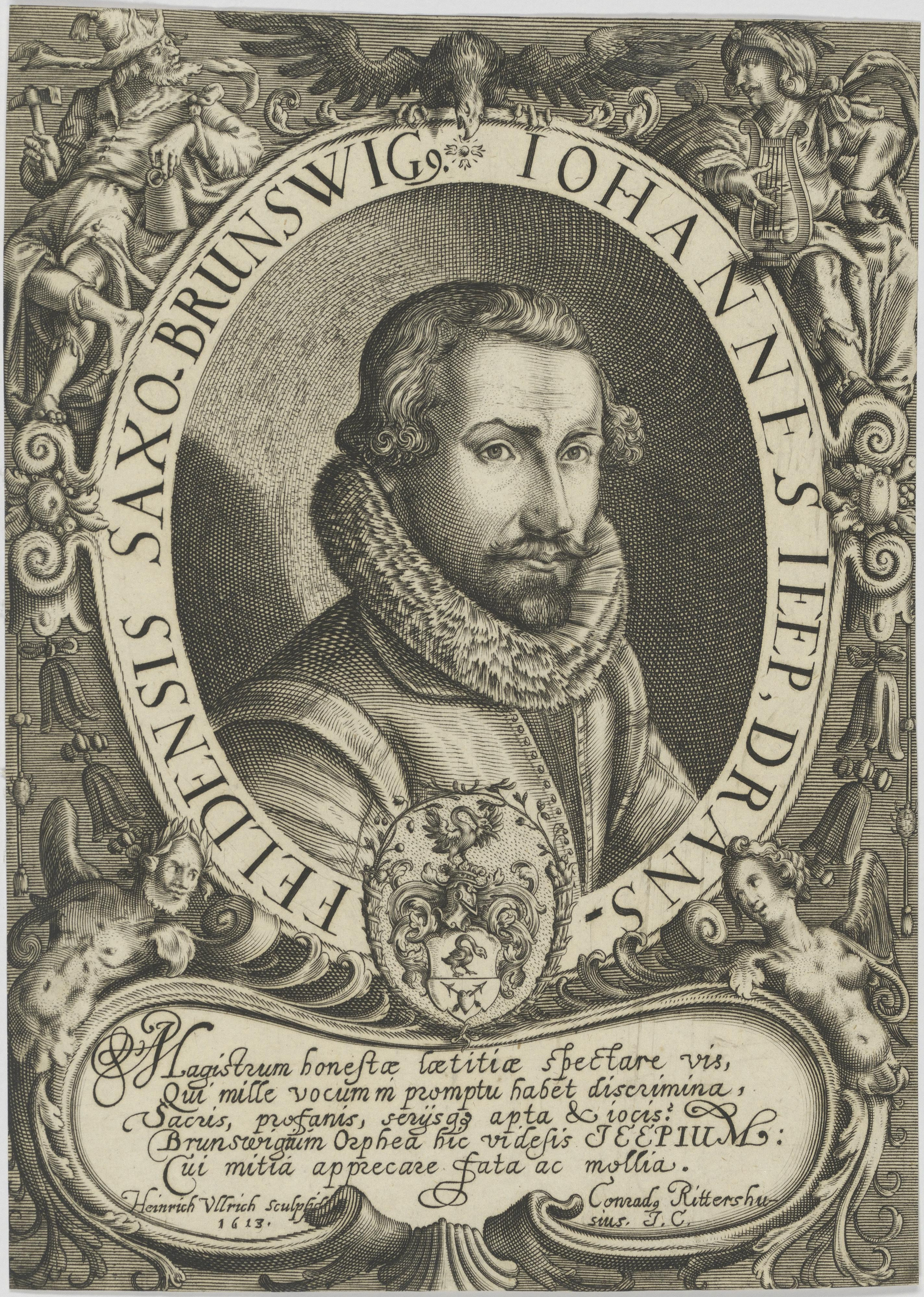
Johannes Jeep, frontispiece from Studentengartlein (1614)

Johannes Jeep (pronounced "Yape"; also Johann or Jepp; 1581/1582 – 19 November 1644) was a German organist, choirmaster and composer.

== Biography ==
Jeep, who was born in Dransfeld, Germany, is remembered for his choral writing. He collected his student songs in Studentengartlein, the first volume published in 1607, the second volume in 1609, and both published as a single volume in 1614. He also published more than one hundred hymns in the Hohenlohe Hymnbook in 1629.

He was one of the first German musicians to travel to Italy. In 1613, he was appointed director of music for the court of the Count of Hohenlohe, serving until 1625. Around 1635, he served as organist at Frankfurt Cathedral. In 1642, he was appointed conductor for the court of the Count of Hanau. He died in Hanau, Germany.

His best-known song is the 4-part madrigal "Musica, die ganz lieblich Kunst" ("Music, the most lovely art").

== Influence ==
The novelist James Joyce was an accomplished tenor. In Ulysses (Episode 16, "Eumaeus", 663:14-22), Joyce's autobiographical character, Stephen Dedalus, performs Jeep's spirited song "Von der Sirenen Listigkeit" ("Of the Siren's Cunning") for Leopold Bloom, and the two men bond over its misogyny.
