= Pierre-Gabriel Buffardin =

French flutist and composer (1693–1768)

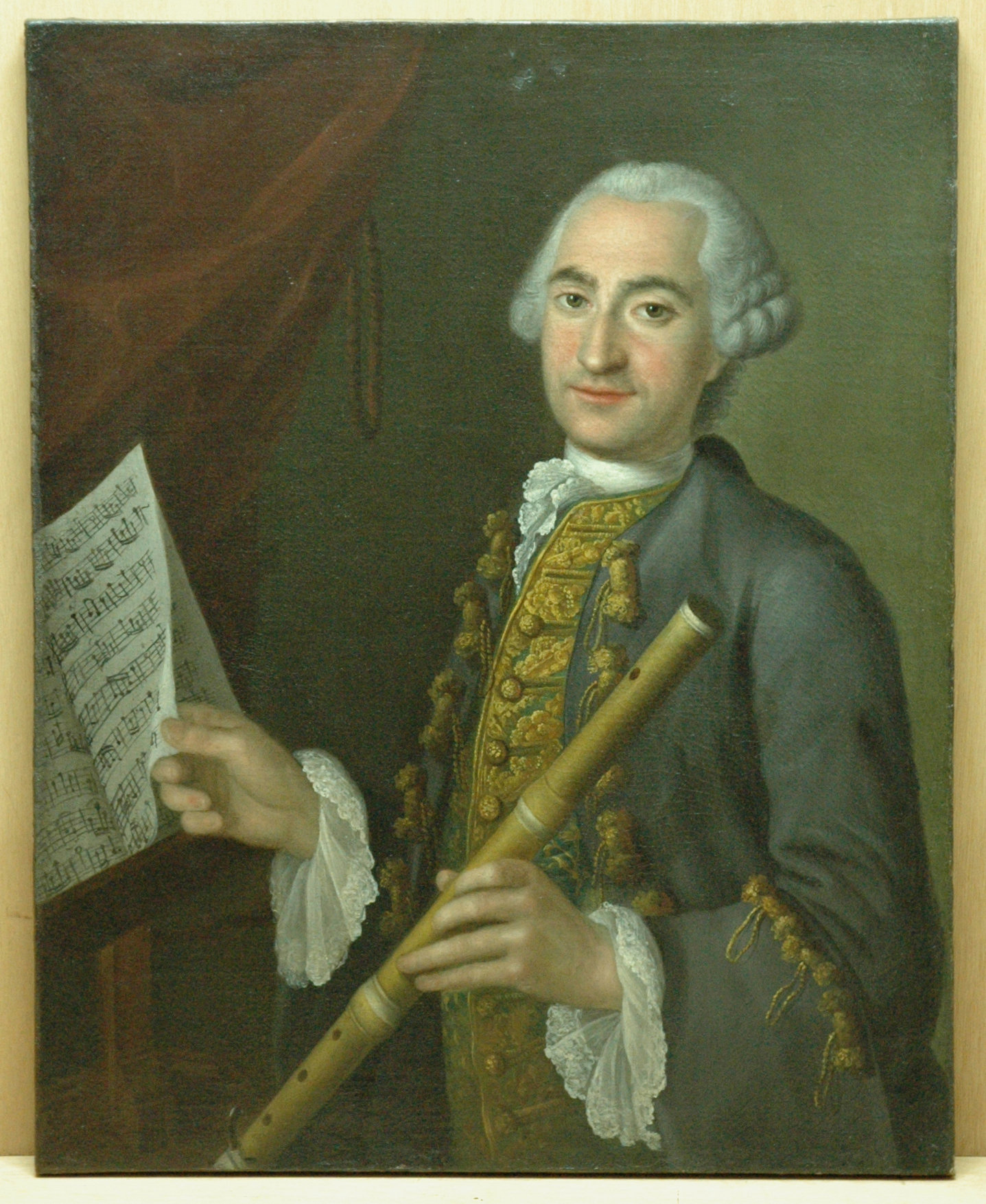
- Born: 24 March 1693; Toulon, Provence
- Died: 13 January 1768 (aged 74); Paris
- Occupations: Flautist; Composer

Pierre-Gabriel Buffardin (Toulon, 24 March 1693 - Paris, 13 January 1768) was a French flutist and composer of the late Baroque period. He was a son of Jean-Joseph Buffardin (Vaison-la-Romaine, 22 July 1664 - Avignon, 28 August 1726), an instrument maker.

Buffardin was the principal flutist of the orchestra (Hofkapelle) at the court of the Elector of Saxony in Dresden from 1715 to 1749. He was the teacher of flutists Johann Joachim Quantz, Pietro Grassi Florio, and Johann Sebastian Bach's elder brother, Johann Jacob Bach, whom he met in Constantinople in 1711.

Buffardin's Concerto in E minor for Flute is the only work which it is certain he wrote. Quantz said of Buffardin: "Il ne jouait que des choses rapides: car c'est en cela qu'excellait mon maître." (Translation: "He only played fast pieces; for in that my master excelled."). Antoine Mahaut claimed that Buffardin was the inventor of the flute's screw cap and the foot register; it remains uncertain whether or not a transverse flute stamped "Buffardin le fils" (discovered in 2015) may be attributed to him or a relative (see Giovanni Tardino, note for recording Bach: Sonate a cembalo obligato e traversiere solo, HRA (HiResAudio), 2018).

== Selected discography ==
- French Baroque Concertos, performed by Musica Antiqua Köln, directed by Reinhard Goebel (Ernst-Burghard Hilse, flute).
- "French Baroque Concertos," performed by Musica Antiqua Köln, directed by Reinhard Goebel (Wilbert Hazelzet, flute)
- "Flötenkonzerte des Barock" performed by Dresden Baroque Soloists (Eckart Haupt, flute)
