= Jeunesses International Music Competition Dinu Lipatti =

Jeunesses International Music Competition Dinu Lipatti was held for the first time in 1994. The event discovers and promotes the values of the new generation of classical music, supports young artists in building a successful career and provides a platform for multicultural dialogue that encourages performance. The idea of establishing this competition started from the desire of a musician to provide in a former communist country, Romania and to create a chance for young artists to participate in an international competition in their country and to benefit from the same conditions as anywhere in the world and to give them a chance to promote cooperation with international and European musical institutions .

The event is named after Romanian pianist Dinu Lipatti.

“I like the idea of Jeunesses Musicals because it makes music accessible to children, allowing young people of modest origins to enter into a realm that otherwise wouldn’t really be open to them.” Dinu Lipatti, Geneve, 1950.

== History ==
Held annually since 1994, the contest has included different disciplines – piano, violin, flute, clarinet, composition, horn, trumpet, singing. In 2011, "Jeunesses Musicales International Competition Bucharest" became "Jeunesses International Music Competition Dinu Lipatti", in honor of Lipatti, who supported and encouraged young musicians. Alongside the competition, the event includes workshops and master classes led by artists and music teachers from European academies.

== Participants ==
The competition has three age categories, encouraging young musicians from the earliest ages to a master competition category: 10–14 years, 14–18 years, 18–30 years. Usually, this competition brings together around 100 musicians from 30 to 40 countries, as a platform for communication and cultural dialogue.

== Jury ==
Jury is formed by recognized artists and professors appreciated in the field with experience in identifying new talent, reconfirmation of their decisions being the laureates professional path.

- Gabriel Croitoru
- Pierre-Yves Artaud – France
- Peter Stoyanov
- Marin Cazacu
- Valentin Gheorghiu
- Stefan Gheorghiu
- Eugenia Moldoveanu
- Alexandru Tomescu
- Violeta Dinescu
- Doina Rotaru
- Aurelian Octav Popa

== Progress ==
The competition takes place in areas with historical and cultural tradition: Athenaeum, Royal Palace – Hall Auditorium, Arcub – Center for Cultural Projects of Bucharest, Central University Library, the Philharmonic Sibiu – Thalia Hall.

== Laureates ==
1994 – REMUS Azoitei Is a violinist of sec. XXIII that currently is a violin professor at the Royal Academy of Music London, known in Romanian audience for charitable and anniversary concerts given together with the Royal Household and through its evolution along the Nigel Kennedy, the Palace Hall Bucharest.

1995 – Alexandru Tomescu He is the winner of Stradivarius violin. He played with Jeunesses Musical Youth Orchestra and as a soloist in 1997 and 1998 tournaments in the US and Japan. He was also present at the most famous concert halls in Europe, such as: Tonhalle Zurich, Het Concertgebouw, Amsterdam, Concert House, Berlin, Musikverein, Vienna.

1996 Jeunesses International Music Competition Dinu Lipatti was the first competition in Romania which was recognized by the European Union of Music Competitions for Youth.

1999 Simina Croitoru was born into a family of musicians and since childhood has shown extraordinary talent, winning the first "Jeunesses Musicales" Bucharest prize.

=== 2000 ===
Trumpet

18–30	Solymosi Peter	Hungary
14–18	Hanganu Dumitru	Moldavia

Piano

18–30	Yamamoto Satoko	Belgium
14–18	Bozhanov Evgeni	Bulgaria
10–14	Gavruc Vitalie	Moldavia
<10	Visovan Maria Aurelia	Romania

Clarinet

18-30	Theodoru Andrei	Romania
14-18	Mamudov Hidan	Macedonia

=== 2001 ===
Violin

18-30	Röhn Anja	Sweden
14-18	Gocan Andrei	Romania
14–18	Long Xi	China
10–14	Manza Dragos Mihail	Romania
<10	Saifi Arslan	Russian Federation

Flute

18-30	Sperissen Jean-Luc	France

=== 2002 ===
Piano

18-30	Smolskaia Ioulia	Russian Federation
14-18	Vanks Rudolfs	Latvia
10-14	Kavalerova Anna	Russian Federation
<10	Napradean Lena	Romania

Clarinet

18-30	Reman Tibor	Romania
14-18	Gao Yuan	China

=== 2003 ===
Violin

14-18	Azizian Loussine	Russian Federation
10-14	Lee Su Yeon	South Koreea
<10	Moscalu Artur	Moldavia

Flute

14-18	Felicia Van Den End	Netherlands

=== 2004 ===
Piano

18-30	Szychowski Piotr	Poland
14-18	Ye Sijing	China
10-14	Wang Chao	China
<10	Tudor Daria Ioana	Romania

Clarinet

18-30	Stolbov Ivan	Federatia Rusa
14-18	Stancioi Ciprian	Romania
14-18	Turk Borut	Slovenia

=== 2005 ===
Violin

18-30	Szadowiak Marianna	Polond
14–18	Shi Shuai	China
10–14	Gao Tianyang	China
<10	Tusupbekova Sharipa	Kazakhstan

Flute

18-30	Lima Ana Raquel	Portugal
14-18	Li Ang	China

Composition

<10	Chan Sze Rok	UK

=== 2006 ===
Piano

14-18	Mihai Ritivoiu	Romania
<10	Kravtsov Lev	Russian Federation

Composition

10-14	Rosenberger Katharina	Switzerland
10-14	Noda Kentaro	Japan
10-14	Martinez Burgos Manuel	Spain
<10	Eduardo Moguillansky	Argentina
<10	Elia Marios	Cyprus
<10	Pelzel Michael	Switzerland
<10	Prete Paolo	Italy
<10	Yamamoto Kazutomo	Japan

Clarinet

18-30	Maria Wilhelmina du Toit	South Africa
14-18	Puia Dorinel	Romania

=== 2007 ===
Violin

18-30	Gocan Andrei	Romania
14-18	Tang Yun	China
10-14	Zhu Minjia	China
<10	Pocitari Lilia	Moldavia

=== 2008 ===
Composition

10-14	Boodram Cameron	SUA
10-14	Longo Marco	Italy
10-14	Nassif Rafael	Brazil
10-14	Odai Kiyomitsu	Japan
10-14	Sikk Jaak	Estonia
<10	Hu Shuhan	China
<10	Bakas Dimitrios	Greece
<10	De Souza Fliblio Ferreira	Brazil
<10	Hurtado Jose Luis	Mexico
<10	Seo Hong Jun	South Koreea
<10	Yamamoto Kazutomo	Japan

Flute

18-30	Yaroshevskiy Stanislav	Russian Federation
14-18	Stoilova Nadya	Bulgaria

Clarinet

14-18	Brazauskas Zilvinas	Lithuania

=== 2009 ===
Violin

18–30	Boursier Khrystyna	Ukraine
14–18	Zhang Chendi	China
10–14	Zhang Jinru	China
<10	Zayranov Martin	Bulgaria

=== 2010 ===
Piano

14-18	Gologan Andrei	Romania
14-18	Li Zixiao	China
10-14	Ursu Melisa	Moldavia
10-14	Xu Jinzhao	China
<10	Boyadzhiev Emil	Bulgaria

=== 2011 ===
Flute

18-30	Bletton Charlotte	France
14-18	Park Yaeram	South Koreea, France

=== 2012 ===
Violin

18-30	Park Sujin	Australia
14-18	Hickey Mairead	Ireland
B<14	Boschkor Lara	Germany

=== 2013 ===
Piano

18-30	Masuda Momoka	Japan, Russia
14-18	Losito Nicola	Italy
14-18	Losito Nicola	Italy
<14	Harliono-Evans George	Uk

=== 2014 ===
Flute

18–30	Carmineluigi Amabile	Italy
14-18	Zolnacz Marianna	Poland

=== 2015 ===
Violin winners will be chosen from the 107 competitors representing 40 countries: Armenia, Austria, Belarus, Belgium, Bulgaria, Canada, China, South Korea, Denmark, Egypt, Switzerland, Finland, France, Georgia, Germany, Ireland, Italy, Japan, Kazakhstan, Latvia, Lithuania, Macedonia, UK, Mexico, New Zealand, Netherlands, Poland, Portugal, Romania, Russia, Serbia, Slovenia, Spain, USA, Sweden, Taiwan – China, Turkey, Ukraine, Hungary, Venezuela .

=== 2016 ===
2016 edition will be held from May 14 to 21 with the reference instrument-piano.

=== 2019 ===
Jeunesses International VIOLIN Competition Dinu Lipatti was held 11 - 18 May 2019

== See also ==
- Official ISME News Blog
