= Jühnde =

- Municipality
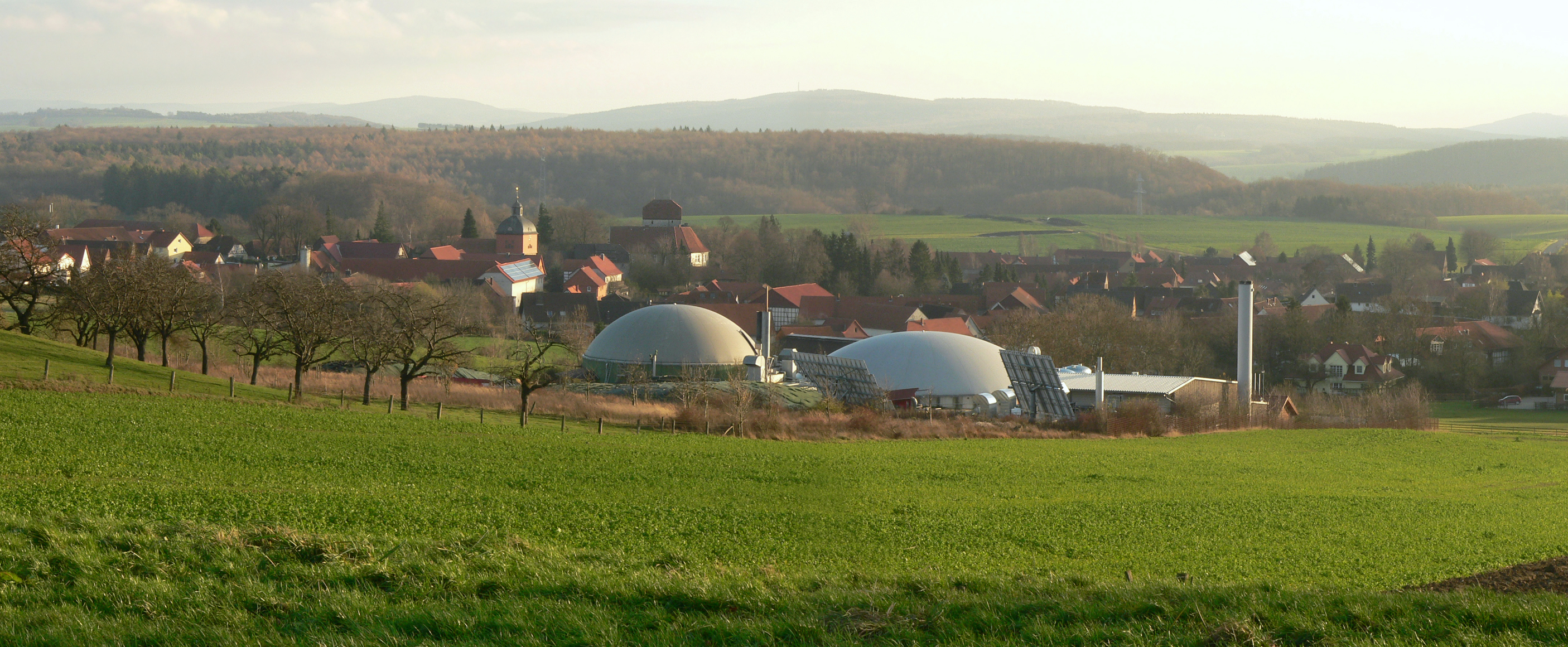

- Flag Coat of arms

- Location of Jühnde within Göttingen district
- Interactive map of Jühnde
- Location within Germany Location within Lower Saxony
- Coordinates: 51°27′53″N 09°48′01″E
- Country: Germany
- State: Lower Saxony
- District: Göttingen
- Municipal assoc.: Dransfeld
- Subdivisions: 2 Ortsteile

Government
  - Mayor: Dietmar Bode

Area
  - Total: 24.54 km^{2} (9.47 sq mi)
- Elevation: 300 m (980 ft)

Population (2025-12-31)
  - Total: 898
  - Density: 36.6/km^{2} (94.8/sq mi)
- Time zone: UTC+01:00 (CET)
  - Summer (DST): UTC+02:00 (CEST)
- Postal codes: 37127
- Dialling codes: 05502
- Vehicle registration: GÖ
- Website: www.juehnde.de

Jühnde (German pronunciation: [ˈjyːndə]) is a municipality in the south of the district of Göttingen, in Lower Saxony, Germany.

Recently, the village has come to be known as the first so-called "bio energy village" in Germany. Since autumn 2005, the heat and electricity supplies for the village have been entirely harnessed from waste products collected from the surrounding fields, by feeding them into a one-of-a-kind biogas plant.
