= Bühren =

- Municipality
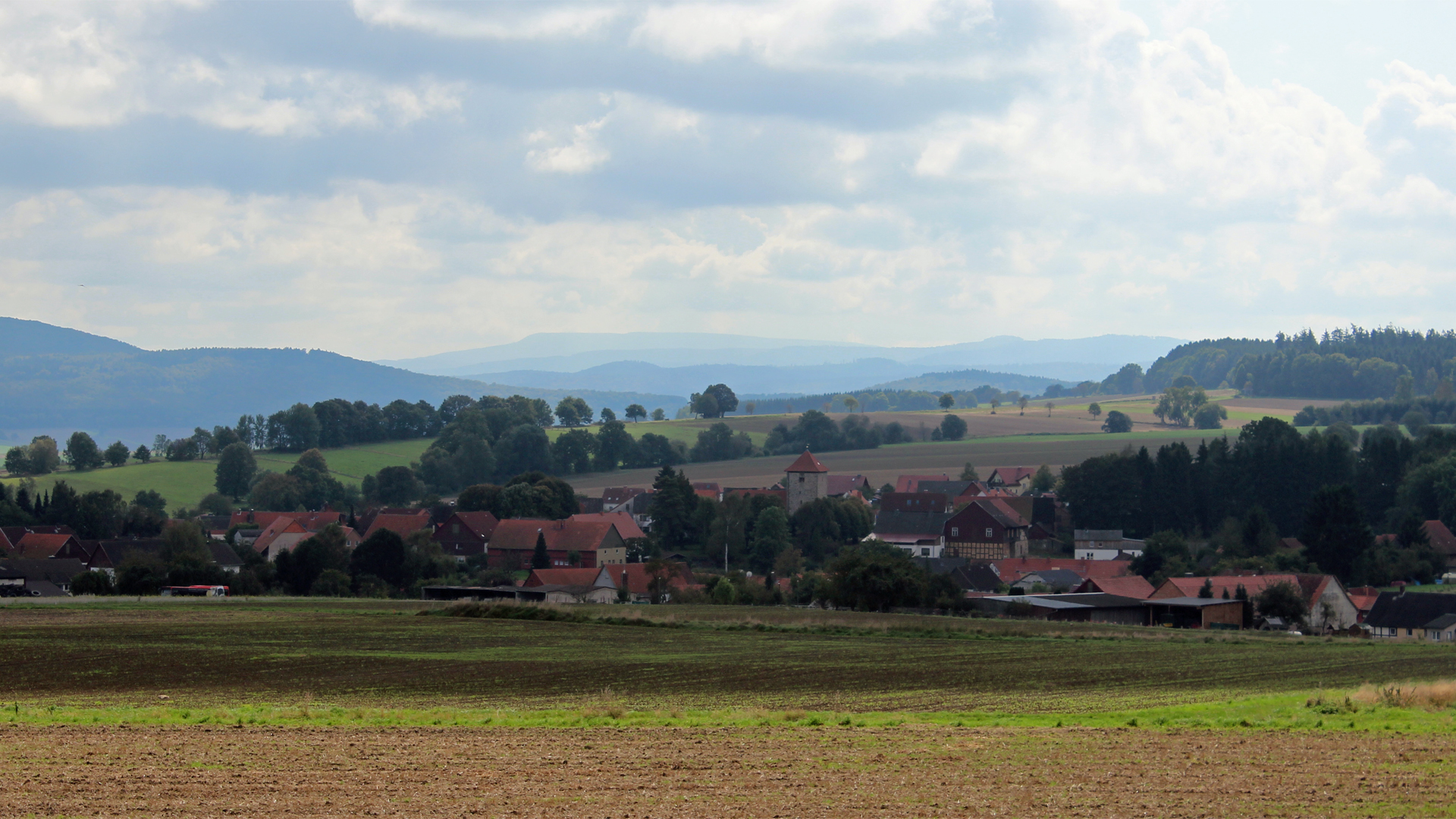

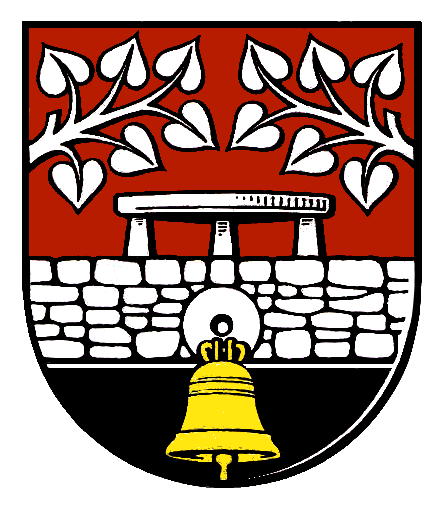
- Coat of arms

- Location of Bühren within Göttingen district
- Interactive map of Bühren
- Location within Germany Location within Lower Saxony
- Coordinates: 51°29′N 09°41′E
- Country: Germany
- State: Lower Saxony
- District: Göttingen
- Municipal assoc.: Dransfeld

Government
  - Mayor: Ute Surup (SPD)

Area
  - Total: 14 km^{2} (5.4 sq mi)
- Elevation: 242 m (794 ft)

Population (2025-12-31)
  - Total: 505
  - Density: 36/km^{2} (93/sq mi)
- Time zone: UTC+01:00 (CET)
  - Summer (DST): UTC+02:00 (CEST)
- Postal codes: 37127
- Dialling codes: 05502
- Vehicle registration: GÖ
- Website: www.buehren.de

Bühren (German pronunciation: [ˈbyːʁən]) is a municipality in the district of Göttingen, in Lower Saxony, Germany.

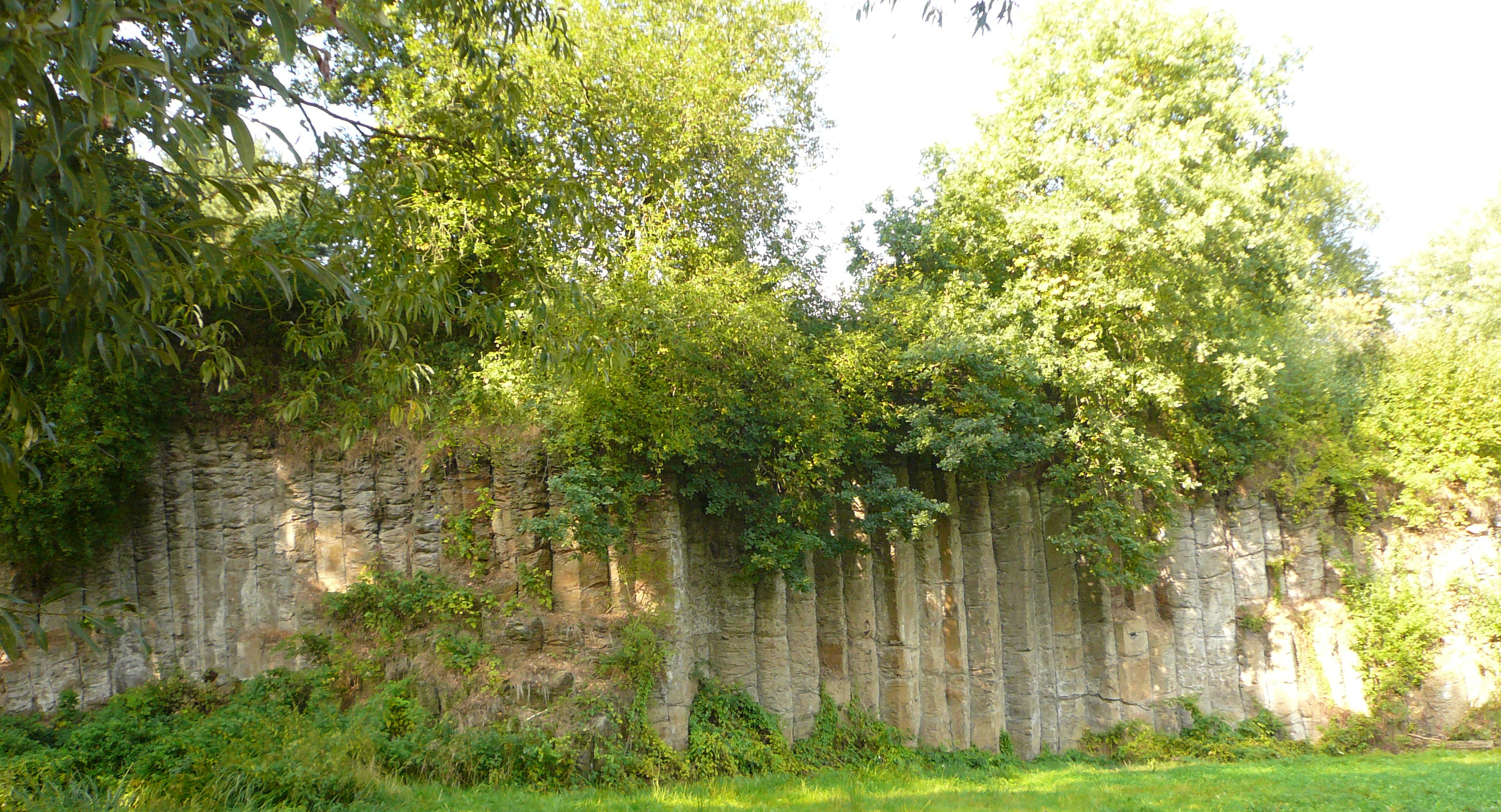
Basalt structures on Buehren.
