= Dransfeld =

- Town
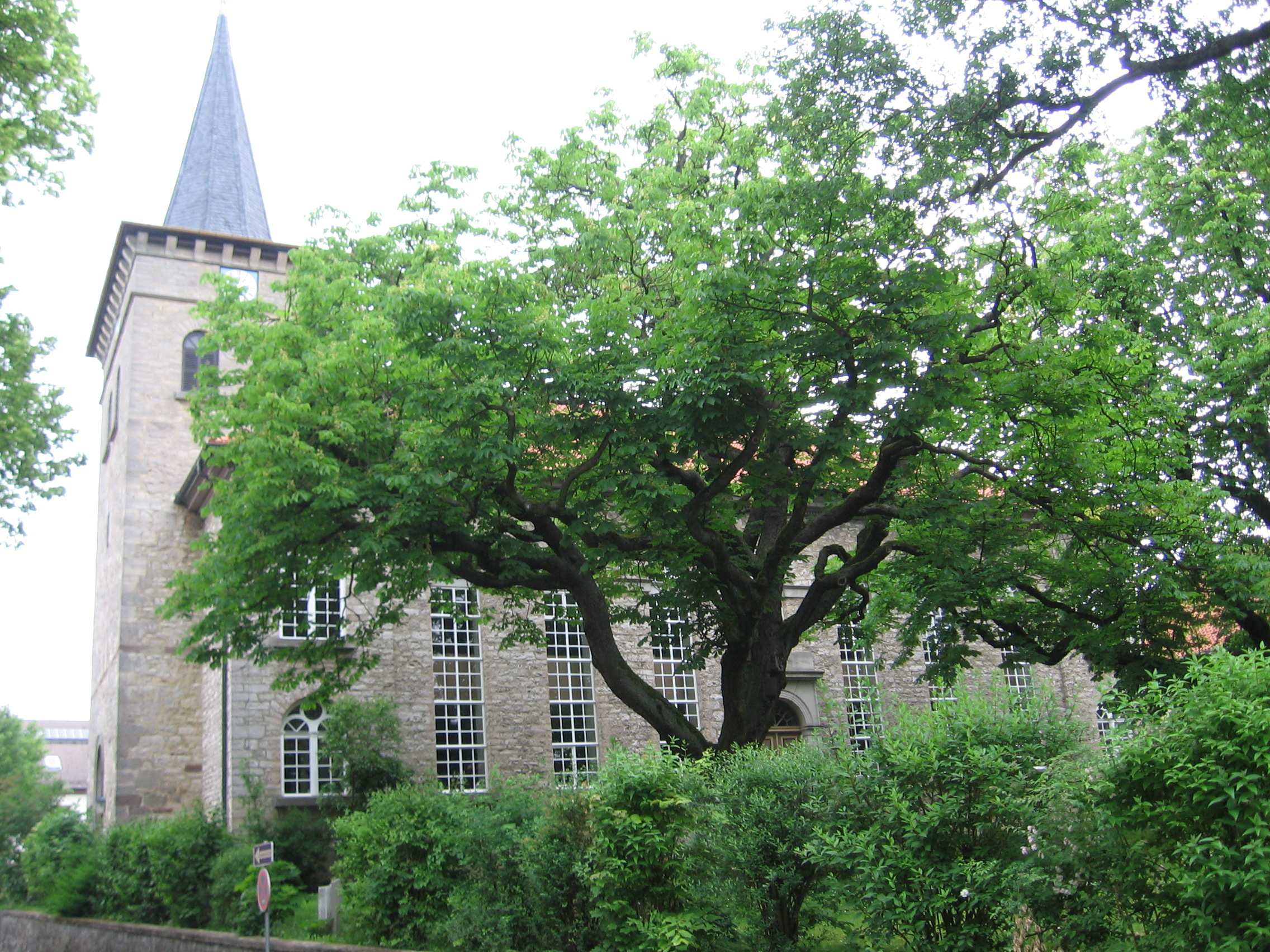
- St Martini Church in Dransfeld.

- Flag Coat of arms

- Location of Dransfeld within Göttingen district
- Interactive map of Dransfeld
- Location within Germany Location within Lower Saxony
- Coordinates: 51°30′N 9°46′E
- Country: Germany
- State: Lower Saxony
- District: Göttingen
- Municipal assoc.: Dransfeld

Government
  - Mayor: Rolf Tobien (SPD)

Area
  - Total: 28.91 km^{2} (11.16 sq mi)
- Elevation: 302 m (991 ft)

Population (2025-12-31)
  - Total: 4,274
  - Density: 147.8/km^{2} (382.9/sq mi)
- Time zone: UTC+01:00 (CET)
  - Summer (DST): UTC+02:00 (CEST)
- Postal codes: 37127
- Dialling codes: 05502
- Vehicle registration: GÖ, HMÜ, DUD, OHA
- Website: www.dransfeld.de

Dransfeld (German pronunciation: [ˈdʁansˌfɛlt]) is a town in the district of Göttingen, in Lower Saxony, Germany. It is situated approximately 12 km west of Göttingen.

Dransfeld is also the seat of the Samtgemeinde ("collective municipality") Dransfeld.

== Infrastructure ==
=== Traffic ===
Bundesstraße 3 runs through Dransfeld connecting it to Göttingen and Hann. Münden and to Bundesautobahn 7, one of the most important motorways in Germany. Bundesautobahn 38 to Halle and Leipzig is also nearby.

Local bus line 120 runs from Göttingen to Hann. Münden up to every 30 minutes and there are several other lines to nearby villages.

The nearby train station in Göttingen is part of the Schnellfahrstrecke Hannover/Würzburg and has regular ICE stops and multiple daily connections to Berlin, Hamburg, Munich, Frankfurt, Stuttgart and Basel.

=== Tourism ===
There is an outdoor pool including a camping area south of the town.

== Born in Dransfeld ==
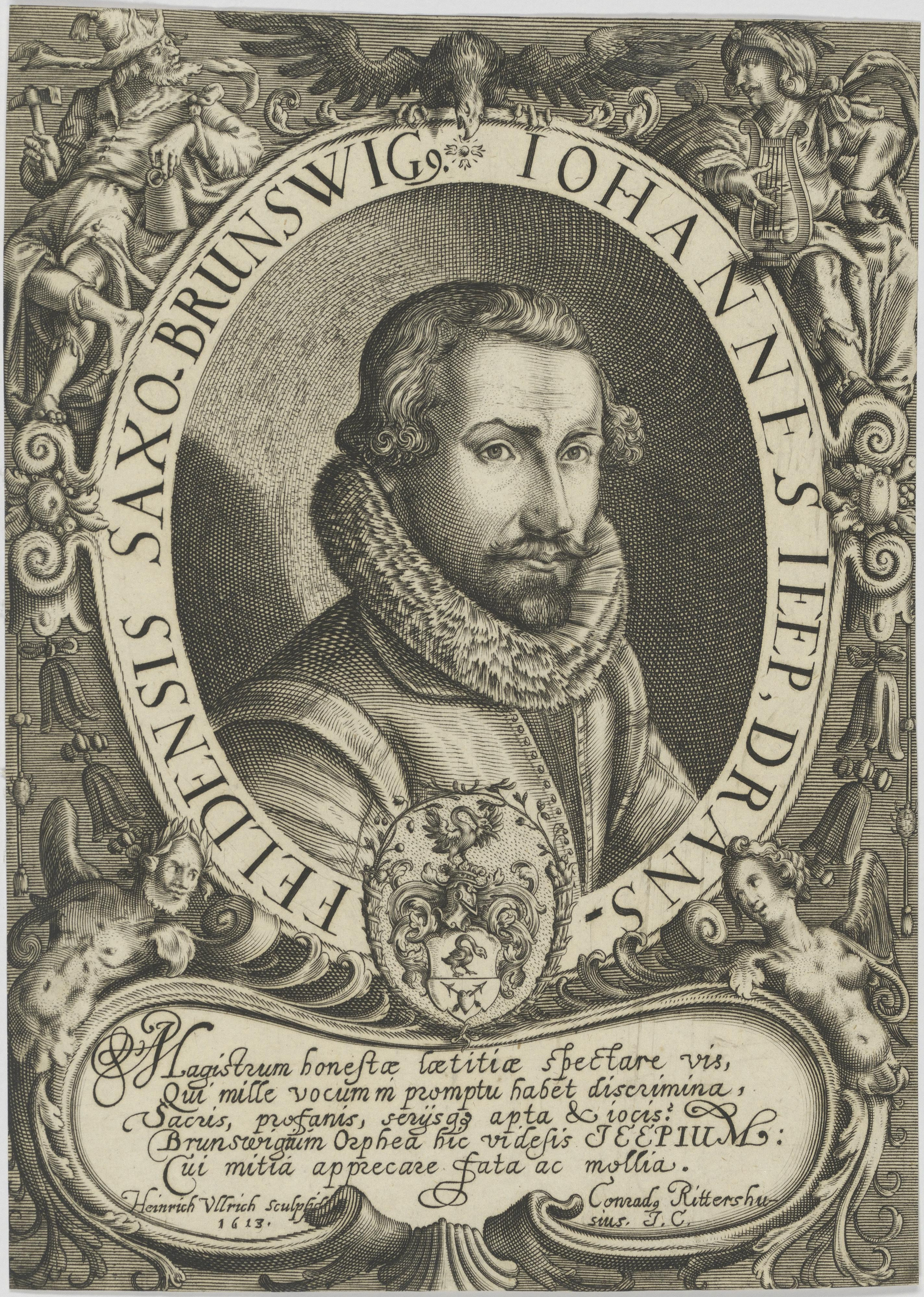
Johannes Jeep in 1613

- Johannes Jeep, (1581/1582 – 1644), German organist, choirmaster and composer
