= Johann Joachim Quantz =

German flautist, composer and flute maker (1697–1773)

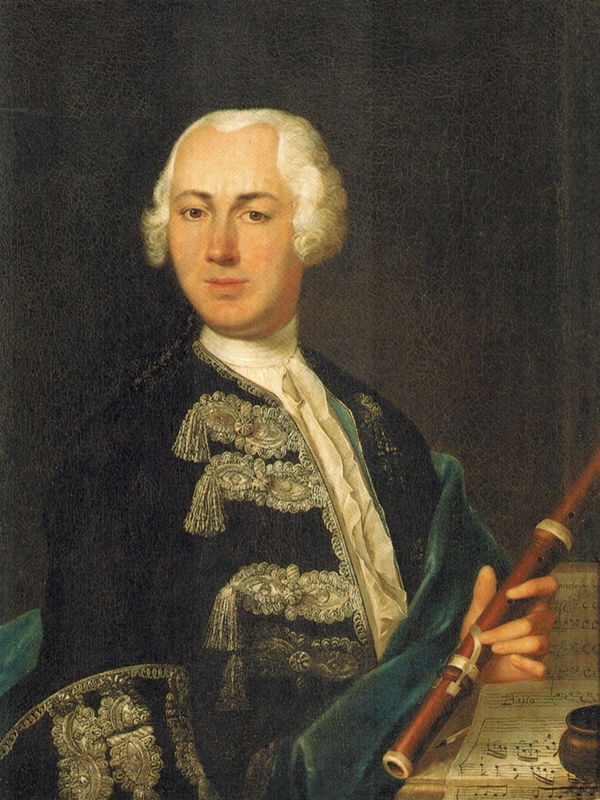
- 1735 portrait
- Born: 30 January 1697; Scheden, Germany
- Died: 12 July 1773 (aged 76); Potsdam, Kingdom of Prussia
- Occupations: composer; flutist; flute maker
- Works: List of compositions

Signature
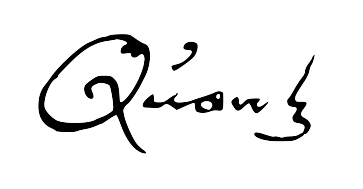

Johann Joachim Quantz (German: [kvants]; 30 January 1697 – 12 July 1773) was a German composer, flautist and flute maker of the late Baroque period. Much of his professional career was spent in the court of Frederick the Great, where he served as the king's flute teacher. Quantz composed hundreds of flute sonatas and concertos, and wrote On Playing the Flute, an influential treatise on flute performance. His works were known and appreciated by Bach and Haydn.

== Biography ==
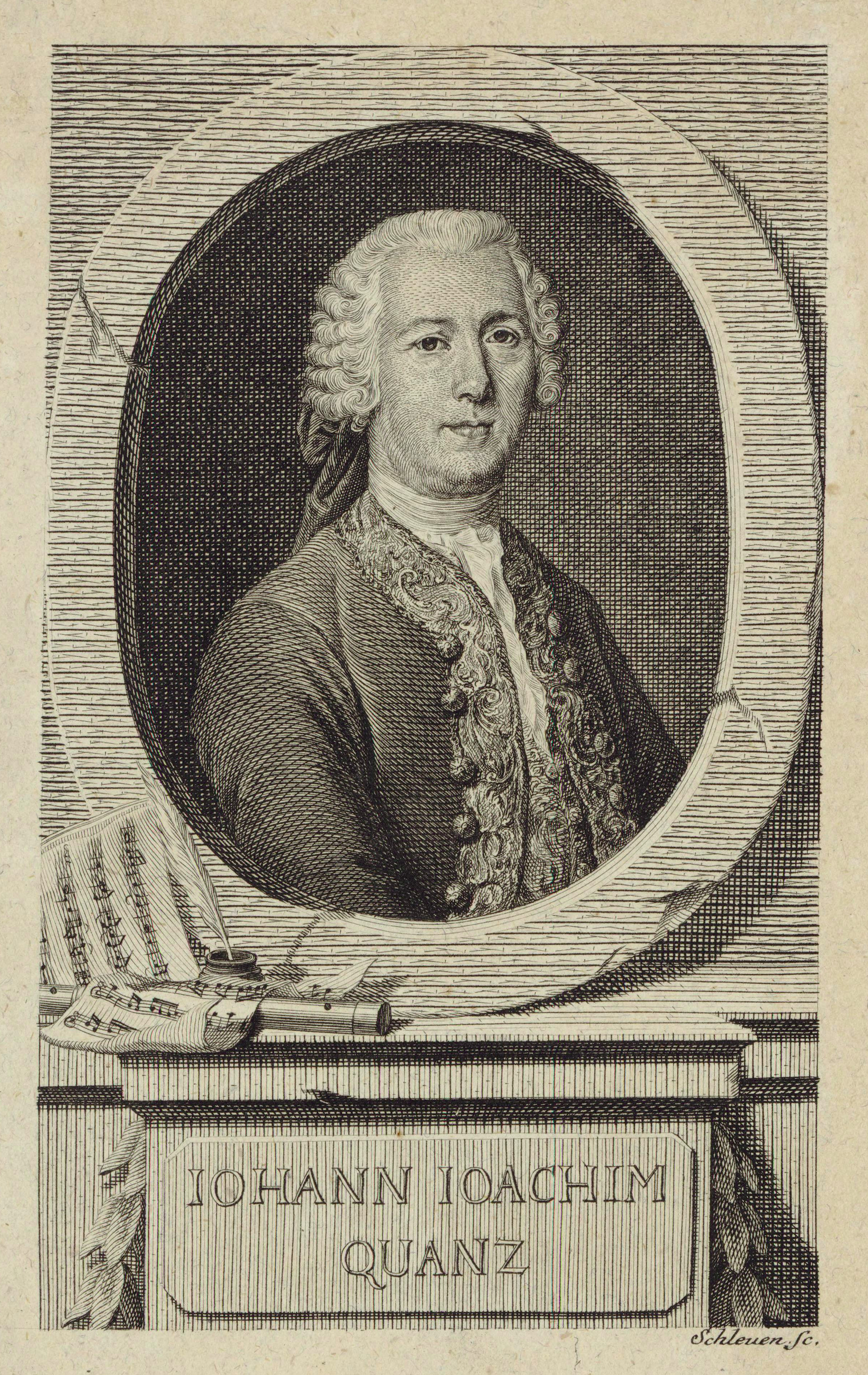
Portrait by Johann David Schleuen, 1767

=== 1697–1723: Early life ===
Quantz was born as Hanß Jochim Quantz in Oberscheden, near Göttingen, Lower Saxony, in the Electorate of Hanover. His father, Andreas Quantz, was a blacksmith who died when Hans was not yet 11; on his deathbed, he declared that his son should follow in his footsteps. Quantz states in his autobiography that he had been trained as a blacksmith from the age of nine. As a result of his father's death he was given the opportunity to choose his own career path and from 1708 to 1713 he began his musical studies with his uncle Justus Quantz, a town musician in Merseburg; he also studied for a time with a cousin's husband, the organist Johann Friedrich Kiesewetter. From 1714, Quantz studied composition extensively and pored over scores of the masters to adopt their style.

In 1716 he joined the town band in Dresden, where in 1717 he studied counterpoint with Jan Dismas Zelenka. In March 1718 he was appointed oboist in the newly formed Dresden Polish Chapel of August II, Elector of Saxony and King of Poland. As it became clear that he couldn't advance as an oboist in the Polish Chapel, Quantz decided to pursue the flute, studying briefly in 1719 with Pierre-Gabriel Buffardin, principal flute in the Royal Orchestra. He became good friends with Johann Georg Pisendel, concertmaster of the Royal Orchestra, who greatly influenced his style.

=== 1724–1727: Grand tour ===
Between 1724 and 1727 Quantz completed his education by doing a "Grand Tour" of Europe as a flautist. He studied counterpoint with Francesco Gasparini in Rome, met Alessandro Scarlatti in Naples, befriended the flutist Michel Blavet in Paris, and in London was encouraged by Handel to remain there. During Carnival 1728 the Crown Prince, Frederick the Great, visited Dresden and met or rehearsed with Pisendel and Quantz. In April Frederick suffered from depressions and hardly ate anything; his father feared for his life. In May 1728 Quantz accompanied August II on a state visit to Berlin. The Queen of Prussia was impressed and wanted to hire him for her son. Though August II refused, he allowed Quantz to travel to Berlin and Bayreuth twice a year. In June 1730 he took part in the Zeithainer Lustlager and travelled to Berlin. Quantz later told writer Friedrich Nicolai that he and Hans Hermann von Katte one day had to hide in a closet during an outburst of Frederick's domineering father, who disapproved of his son's hairstyle, musical studies, questionable books and fancy dressing gowns. Quantz married Anna Rosina Carolina Schindler in 1737; the marriage was not happy, and it was generally known in Berlin that his wife tyrannized him. Until 1741 Quantz remained at the Saxon Court in Dresden.

=== 1741–1773: Court of Frederick ===
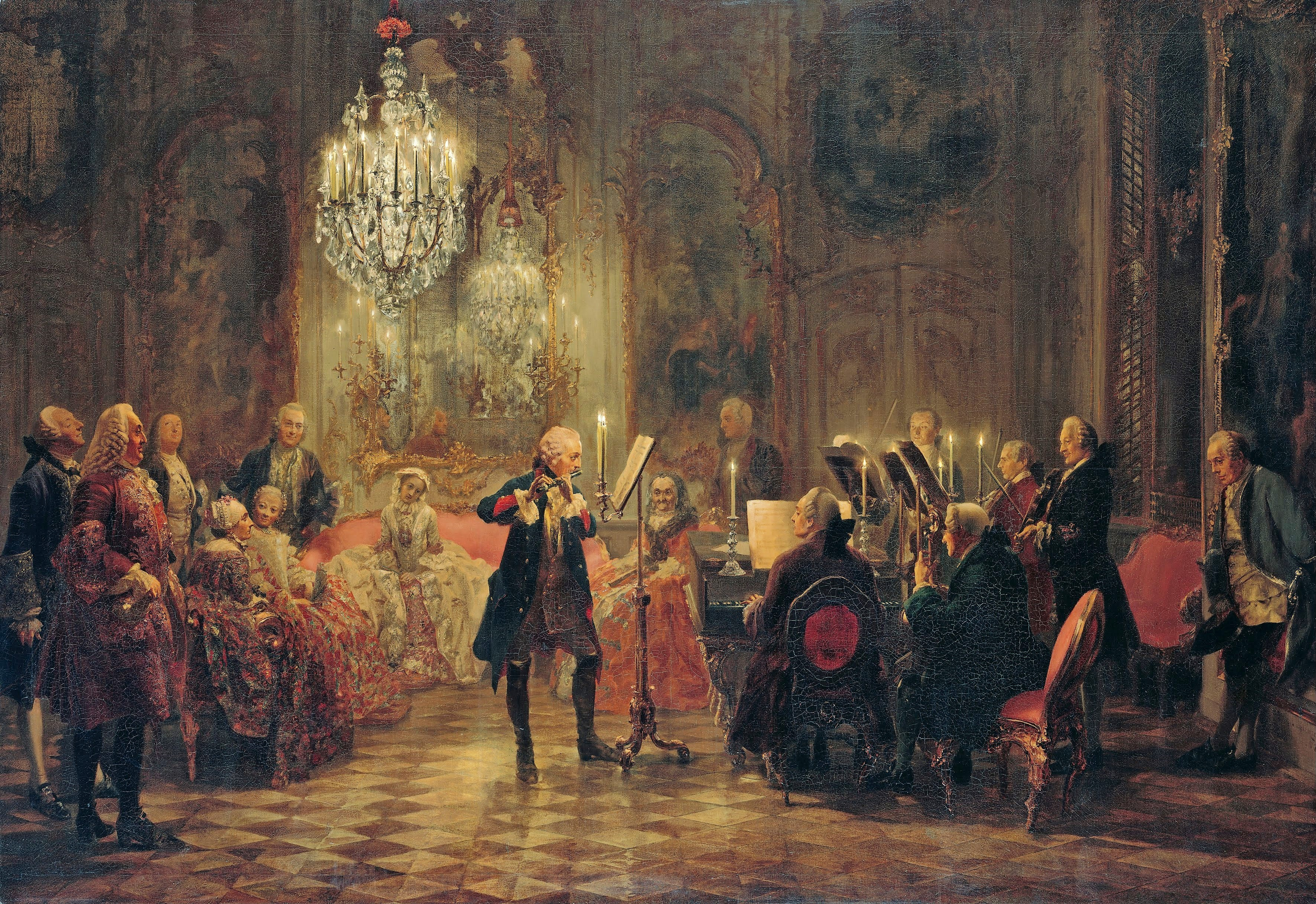
Frederick the Great playing a flute concerto in Sanssouci, C. P. E. Bach at the harpsichord, Quantz leaning on the wall to the right; by Adolph Menzel, 1852

When Frederick II became King of Prussia in 1740, Quantz finally accepted a position as flute teacher, flute maker and composer. He joined at the court in Berlin in December 1741 and stayed there for the rest of his career. He made flutes from at least 1739 and was an innovator in flute design, adding a second key (Eb, in addition to the standard D#) to help with intonation, for example. Frederick owned 11 flutes made by Quantz.

As well as writing hundreds of sonatas and concertos, mainly for the flute, he is known today as the author of Versuch einer Anweisung die Flöte traversiere zu spielen (1752) (titled On Playing the Flute in English), a treatise on traverso flute playing. It is a valuable source of reference regarding performance practice and flute technique in the 18th century.

Quantz never joined Frederick's orchestra, lived in Berlin-Mitte (Kronenstrasse), but played at Frederick's court until his death in 1773. A biography appeared in 1755 in Friedrich Wilhelm Marpurg's Historisch-kritischen Beyträgen zur Aufnahme der Musik; another, in Italian, followed in 1762. His grandnephew, Albert Quantz, published a full-length biography in 1877.

== Works ==
Sonata Concertate in D
Performed by Alex Murray (traverso) and Martha Goldstein (harpsichord)

Few of Quantz's works were published during his lifetime. Most of them are for transverse flute, including more than 200 sonatas, around 300 concertos, including several for two flutes; around 45 trio sonatas (mostly for 2 flutes or flute and violin, with continuo); 6 quartets for flute, violin, viola and continuo; various flute duets and flute trios; and unaccompanied caprices and fantasias for flute.

The thematic catalog for Quantz's works was published by Horst Augsbach. 'QV' stands for 'Quantz Verzeichnis', and 'Anh.' for 'Anhang' ("supplement") when the authenticity of the works is in doubt. A number of additional works have been discovered or come to light since its publication.
