= Roman Trekel =

German operatic baritone and Lied-singer

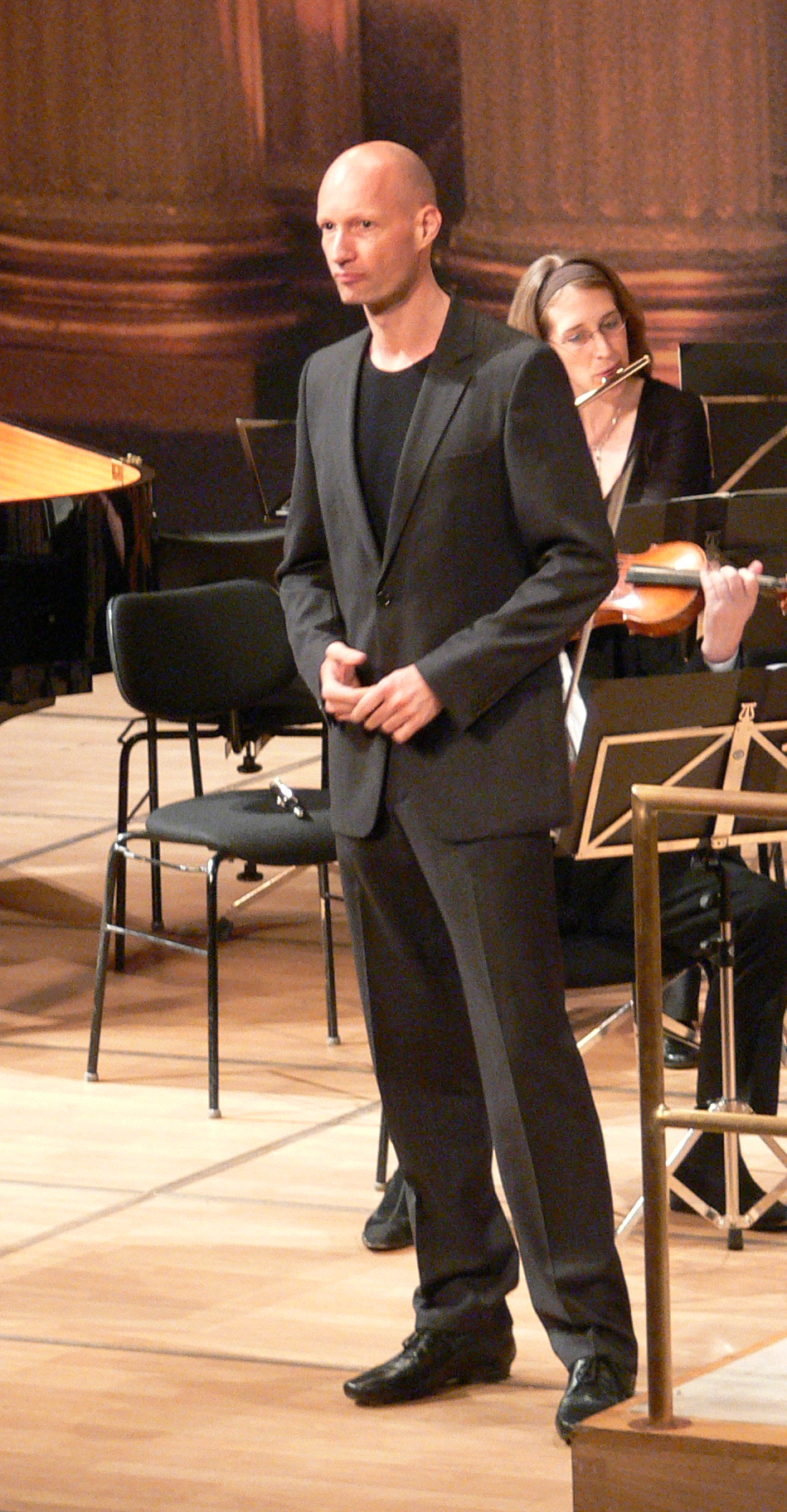
Roman Trekel, May 2008

Roman Trekel (born Pirna near Dresden in 1963) is a German operatic baritone and Lied-singer. He was awarded the title of Kammersänger in 2000.
