= Eckart Haupt =

German flutist (born 1945)

Eckart Haupt (born 2 November 1945) is a German flutist and university teacher. The Staatskapelle Dresden described him on their homepage as one of the "leading flutists of the present".

== Life ==
Born in Zittau, Saxony, Haupt grew up in Görlitz. He later studied in Dresden with Fritz Rucker (flute) and Manfred Weiss, as well as musical composition in the University of Music and Theatre Leipzig with Erich List (flute). He had his first jobs in Dessau and Berlin. In 1970, he was engaged by Kurt Masur as solo flutist of the Dresden Philharmonic. In 1981 he got an engagement as principal flutist of the Staatskapelle Dresden by Herbert Blomstedt, where he played until his retirement in 2010. Solo concerts in Europe, Japan, the Middle East, South America and the USA followed. Since 1992 he plays as solo flutist in the Bayreuth Festival orchestra.

Haupt has a broad repertoire ranging from Baroque to modern music. He has co-edited historical sources with Peters and Hofmeister Leipzig (e.g. by Johann Joachim Quantz and his teacher Pierre-Gabriel Buffardin and the Viennese composer and pianist Leopoldine Blahetka). His recordings are award-winning. The recordings with works by Johann Sebastian Bach and Carl Philipp Emanuel Bach were considered exemplary

Haupt holds a professorship at the Hochschule für Musik Carl Maria von Weber. Some of his students have found employment as flutists in the major orchestras of Germany. He is director of international master classes. Haupt has received numerous prizes and awards, for example the Fritz Busch Prize.

In 2010 Haupt received his doctorate on the topic Die Einführung der Böhmflöte in der Dresdner Hofkapelle (The introduction of the Boehm flute in the Dresden court orchestra) at the Hochschule für Musik Carl Maria von Weber Dresden. The revised version was published in 2011 as volume 2 of the Studien zum Dresdner Musikleben im 19. Jahrhundert by Verlag Dohr.

Haupt also deals with painting and graphics, works by him have already been exhibited several times, e.g. in 2011 in the series "Malende Musiker - Musizierende Maler" of the Sächsischer Musikrat in Colditz Castle.

== Publications ==
- Eckart Haupt: Flöten – Flötisten – Orchesterklang. Die Staatskapelle Dresden zwischen Weber und Strauss. Dohr, Cologne 2011, ISBN 978-3-936655-91-9.
