= Petru Stoianov =

Romanian composer

Petru Stoianov (born October 29, 1939, in Vinga, Arad County) is a Romanian composer.

Known as a modern composer, he signed a unique suite of lieds on Mihai Eminescu's poems. Petru Stoianov is a university professor, Ph.D. and The Dean of the Music Academy at Spiru Haret University. He is married to a musicologist, Carmen Stoianov, who is also a university professor, Ph.D.
