= Robert Hando =

Australian rules footballer

Personal information
- Full name: Robert Hando
- Born: 6 April 1944 (age 82)
- Original team: Warrnambool West End
- Height: 193 cm (6 ft 4 in)
- Weight: 85 kg (187 lb)

Playing career^{1}
Years	Club	Games (Goals)
1967	South Melbourne	2 (0)
- ^{1} Playing statistics correct to the end of 1967.

Robert Hando (born 6 April 1944) is a former Australian rules footballer who played with South Melbourne in the Victorian Football League (VFL).
