= Lauma Skride =

Latvian pianist

Lauma Skride (born 20 March 1982 in Riga) is a Latvian pianist.

== Life ==
Lauma's father, Arnolds Skride, conducts a musical ensemble after ten years as a violinist at the Dailes Theatre. He is the adopted son of the painter Ārijs Skride. Lauma's mother is the pianist Liga Skride. Lauma is the youngest of three sisters, all three of whom have devoted themselves to music. She began studying the piano at the age of 5 and then entered the Jāzeps Vītols Latvian Academy of Music. She also studied at the Hamburg Conservatory with Professor Volker Banfield.

In June 1998, Skride took part in the 9th edition of the Eurovision Young Musicians in Vienna.

She became known to a wider audience through performances as a duo with her sister Baiba, with whom she also released an album in March 2007 with works by Franz Schubert, Ludwig van Beethoven and Maurice Ravel. Her solo debut album with recordings of Fanny Hensel was already released in January 2007. Since then, she has increasingly established herself as a soloist. In 2009, for example, she made her debut with the hr-Sinfonieorchester and has appeared as a guest with orchestras such as the Hamburger Symphoniker and the Staatsphilharmonie Nürnberg.

Skride performs on stages all over the world and her duo concerts with her sister Baiba Skride (violinist) helped her to make herself known. She founded with her and the violist Lise Berthaud and the cellist Harriet Krijgh the Skride Piano Quartet.

== Recording ==
- 2007 Lauma Skride : Mendelssohn-Hensel - The Year
- 2007 Baiba & Lauma Skride : The Duo Sessions - Beethoven, Schubert, Ravel.
- 2022 Lauma Skride & Brandenburger Symphoniker - Beethoven, Pianoconcerto no.4, variationen WoO 80.
