= Christiane Oelze =

German operatic soprano (born 1963)

Christiane Oelze (born 9 October 1963 in Cologne) is a German operatic soprano. From 2003 to 2008, she taught singing at the Robert Schumann Hochschule Düsseldorf. Since 2010 she taught at the Masterclass of Apeldoorn (Netherlands), since 2011 at the Musik Academy in Arosa and since 2012 at IRCAM in Paris.

Numerous opera performances, especially Mozart-roles, she sang in London (Covent Garden), Paris (Théâtre Garnier), in Glyndebourne, Hamburg (Hamburger Staatsoper) at the Salzburg Festival and Mozartwochen in Salzburg, the Mostly Mozart Festival in New York and at the Lucerne Festival.

2015 she had produced 70 CDs and DVDs. Her recording of the Mahler-symphony No. 4, arranged by Erwin Stein, was highlighted by the Preis der deutschen Schallplattenkritik in 2006, also 2016 her Schönberg-Stringquartets No. 2 and No. 4. She is a jury-member of international contests.
