= Olaf Bär =

German opera singer

Olaf Bär (born 19 December 1957) is a German operatic baritone.

== Life ==
Bär received his musical training in his home city of Dresden, studying at the city's Hochschule für Musik. His career has concentrated on lieder and on the lyric baritone roles of the operatic repertoire. Many of his early lieder performances were accompanied by Geoffrey Parsons.

His operatic debut was in 1981 in Dresden and he was a member of that city's opera company (Semperoper) from 1985 to 1991. His voice has been compared favorably with that of Dietrich Fischer-Dieskau.

== Selected recorded repertoire ==
- Bach: Cantatas with Peter Schreier and the Scottish Chamber Orchestra (EMI, 1991)
- Brahms: A German Requiem (EMI, 1992)
- Duruflé: Requiem (EMI, 1988)
- Fauré: Requiem (EMI, 1988)
- Mahler (arr. Schoenberg): Lieder eines fahrenden Gesellen with Linos Ensemble (Capriccio, 1999)
- Mozart: The Magic Flute (Papageno) with Neville Marriner (Philips, 1989)
- Mozart: The Magic Flute (Sprecher) with Roger Norrington and the London Classical Players (EMI, 1990)
- Schubert: Winterreise (EMI, 1988)
- Schumann: Lieder (EMI, 1985, 1989, 1996, 1997)
- Wagner: Tristan und Isolde (Kurwenal) with the Royal Opera House Chorus, Covent Garden; the Royal Opera House Orchestra, Covent Garden; Antonio Pappano (EMI, 2004/05)
