= Jochen Kowalski =

German opera singer

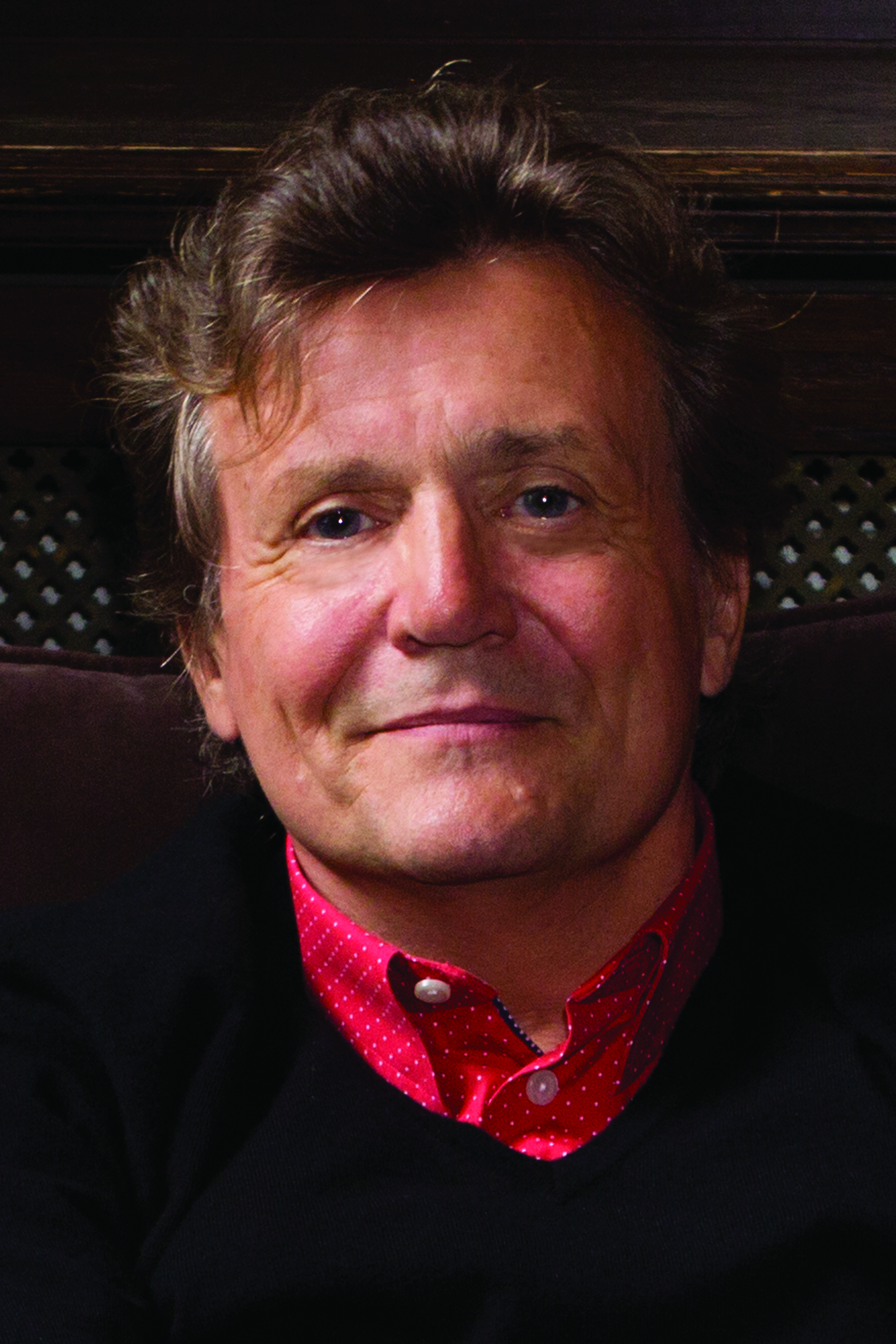
Portrait of Kowalski

Jochen Kowalski (born 30 January 1954) is a German alto or mezzo countertenor, noted for his very rich timbre.

== Early life ==
Jochen Kowalski was born in Wachow, Nauen District, Bezirk Potsdam, in East Germany (now a small village belonging to the city of Nauen), as the son of a butcher. His parents gave him a musical education. In 1977 he began his studies as a Heldentenor, specializing in Wagner, but when it became clear he was able to sing "Che farò senza Euridice?" as a stand-in Jochen was sent to Theo Adam and switched to countertenor. Kowalski specialized in baroque and classical music. He received his training at the Deutsche Hochschule für Musik in East-Berlin, in particular with the vocal pedagogue Marianne Fischer-Kupfer.

== Career ==
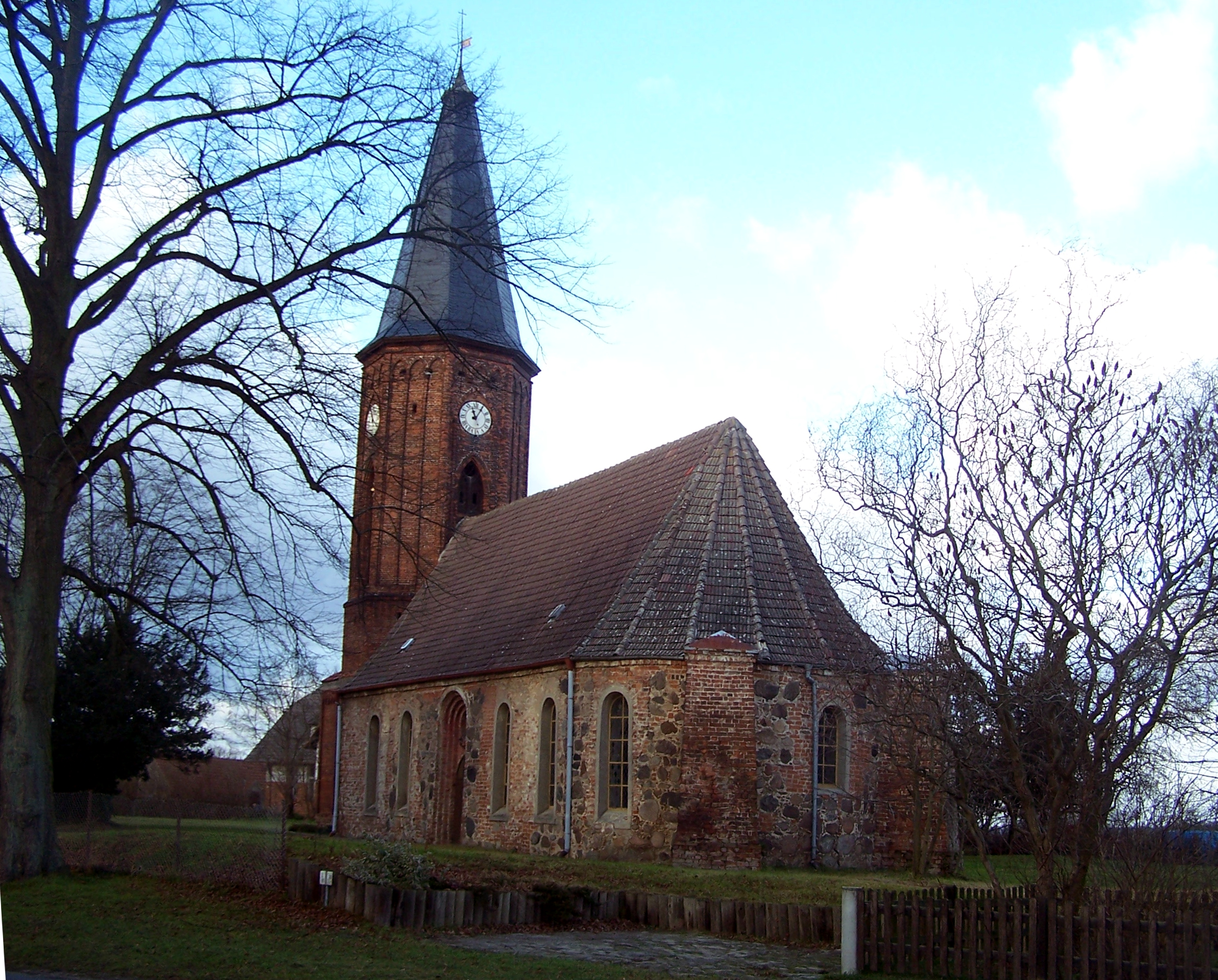
Church in Wachow, where Kowalski grew up

After completing his studies in 1983, Kowalski was engaged as soloist at the Komische Oper in Berlin. In 1984 he sang the title role in Georg Frideric Handel's Giustino, staged by Harry Kupfer. The artist drew international attention through his performance of Orpheus in Gluck's Orfeo ed Euridice in a new staging of the work in December 1987, and in the travelling production by the Komische Oper in August 1989 in London. Kupfer's Orpheus wears a leather jacket and carries an electric guitar in this innovative interpretation.

In 1984, Kowalski made his debut with the Hamburg State Opera singing the role of Daniel in G.F. Handel's oratorio Belshazzar in Harry Kupfer's staged realization under the musical direction of Gerd Albrecht. Since then he has been under contract at the State Opera, where he has also distinguished himself in many solo concerts. In 1987 and 1988, Kowalski appeared at the Netherlands Opera in Amsterdam and the Grand Opera in Paris. He made his debut in the Vienna State Opera and at the Royal Opera House Covent Garden in London in 1991, both times as Prince Orlofsky in Die Fledermaus. Kowalski also starred as Farnace in Mitridate, re di Ponto by Mozart at Covent Garden 1991. He made his debut at the Metropolitan Opera in 1994 as Orlofsky. In 1995 he took part in the Salzburg Festival. He has established a reputation as a concert and oratorio singer in the major musical centres of Europe, the USA and Japan, working with such conductors as Gary Bertini, Neville Marriner, Vittorio Negri, Zubin Mehta, and Nikolaus Harnoncourt, among others. He has performed in Austria, France, Japan, Netherlands, United Kingdom, and the United States and is well received by critics.

Kowalski is still a member of the Komischer Oper ensemble, and performs in the Volksbühne. One of his favourite singers is Lotte Lehmann; then there are Franz Völker and Fritz Wunderlich. Kowalski lives in Pankow in the north of Berlin. In 2013 his autobiography was published: Der Countertenor Jochen Kowalski: Gespräche mit Susanne Stähr. Henschel Verlag, Leipzig. ISBN 978-3-89487-930-3.
