= Peter Damm =

German horn player

- Born: July 27, 1937 (age 88); Meiningen, Thuringia, Germany
- Genres: Classical
- Occupations: Horn player; Professor
- Instrument: Horn
- Years active: 1957–2007
- Awards: Kammermusiker (1969); Kammervirtuose (1971); National Prize of the German Democratic Republic (1979); Fritz Busch Award (1995); Art Award of the City of Dresden (1998)

Peter Damm (born 27 July 1937, Meiningen, Thüringen) is a German horn player.

He began his musical education aged eleven, on the violin, and started playing the horn in 1951 and graduated from the Franz Liszt Academy in 1957. In 1959 he was appointed as principal horn of the Leipzig Gewandhaus Orchestra, and from 1969 to 2002 he was principal horn at the Dresden Staatskapelle. On his retiring, the orchestra made him an honorary member. He is professor of horn at the Carl Maria von Weber music conservatoire (Hochschule für Musik) in Dresden.

He was awarded the title "Kammermusiker" in 1969, and "Kammervirtuose" in 1971.

His professional career saw him touring extensively in Europe, as well as Japan and North America. He has also given many masterclasses and seminars. Peter Damm performed the Richard Strauss Horn Concerto Op.11 over 150 times.

Since 1986, Peter Damm has been president of the International Competition for Wind Instruments in Markneukirchen. He is an honorary member of the International Horn Society.

Damm has been described as "legendary" – he is known for both his exceptional abilities as a player, and for his editions of many of the standard works in the horn repertoire, published by Breitkopf. In particular, his recordings of Strauss with the Staatskapelle Dresden are still in demand.
