= Hando Nahkur =

Estonian pianist

Hando Nahkur (born 7 July 1982) is an Estonian pianist.

Since 2003, Hando Nahkur has been living in the United States. He holds a Bachelor's degree from the New England Conservatory of Music, a Master's degree from the Yale University School of Music, an Artist Diploma from the Texas Christian University School of Music, and diplomas from the Southern Methodist University Meadows School of the Arts. Nahkur is the first musician to receive the prestigious Artist Diploma from the Meadows School of the Arts. His instructors in the United States have included Pamela Mia Paul, Joaquín Achúcarro, Tamás Ungár, Gabriel Chodos and Boris Berman. He is also nearing the completion of his doctoral studies at the University of North Texas.

Since 2006, he is a member of Association of Estonian Professional Musicians.

== Awards ==
He has won several national and international awards:

- First Prize in the Estonian National Piano Competition (Estonia)
- National Winner of Eurovision Young Musicians (Austria)
- Special Prize winner in the Tchaikovsky International Piano Competition (Russia)
- Recipient of the Harold Von Mickwitz Prize (USA)
- Golden Medal of Merit (Canada)
- Diplomat of Nation Certificate of Merit (Estonia)
