= Schadenbeek =

River in Germany

Location
- Country: Germany
- States: Lower Saxony

Physical characteristics
- Mouth
  - location: Krumme Lutter
  - coordinates: 51°40′14″N 10°28′34″E

Basin features
- Progression: Krumme Lutter→ Lutter→ Oder→ Rhume→ Leine→ Aller→ Weser→ North Sea

Schadenbeek is a small river of Lower Saxony, Germany. It flows into the Krumme Lutter north of Bad Lauterberg.

== See also ==
- List of rivers of Lower Saxony
