= Heibeek =

River in Germany

Location
- Country: Germany
- States: Lower Saxony

Physical characteristics
- Mouth
  - location: Lutter
  - coordinates: 51°37′51″N 10°27′34″E

Basin features
- Progression: Lutter→ Oder→ Rhume→ Leine→ Aller→ Weser→ North Sea

Heibeek is a small river of Lower Saxony, Germany. It flows into the Lutter near Bad Lauterberg.

== See also ==
- List of rivers of Lower Saxony
