= Lutter =

Lutter or Lütter may refer to:

== Places ==
=== France ===
- Lutter, Haut-Rhin, a commune in the Haut-Rhin department

=== Germany ===
- Lutter am Barenberge, a municipality in the Goslar district, Lower Saxony
- Lutter am Barenberge (Samtgemeinde), a collective municipality in the Goslar district, Lower Saxony
- Lutter, Thuringia, a municipality in the Eichsfeld district, Thuringia
- Lutter, a locality of Neustadt am Rübenberge in the Hanover area, Lower Saxony

== Rivers in Germany ==
- Lutter (Aa), headwater stream of the Aa in North Rhine-Westphalia
- Lutter (Ems), tributary of the Ems in North Rhine-Westphalia
- Lutter (Frieda), tributary of the Frieda in Thuringia
- Lutter (Lachte), tributary of the Lachte in Lower Saxony
- Lutter (Leine), tributary of the Leine in Göttingen, Lower Saxony
- Lutter (Oder), tributary of the Oder in Lower Saxony
  - Grade Lutter, headstream of this Lutter
  - Krumme Lutter, headstream of this Lutter
- Lutter (Schunter), tributary of the Schunter in Lower Saxony
- Lütter, tributary of the Fulda in Hesse

== People ==
- Alfred Lutter (born 1962), American former child actor
- Howard Lutter (1889–1959), American musician and composer best known for creation of player piano rolls
- Lilian G. Lutter, British educationist who spent most part of her career in India
- Parke Lutter, fashion designer (Parke & Ronen)
- Travis Lutter (born 1973), American mixed martial arts fighter
- Vera Lutter (born 1960), New York-based artist

== Other uses ==
- Lutter (TV series), Germany 2007–2010
