= Stöberhai =

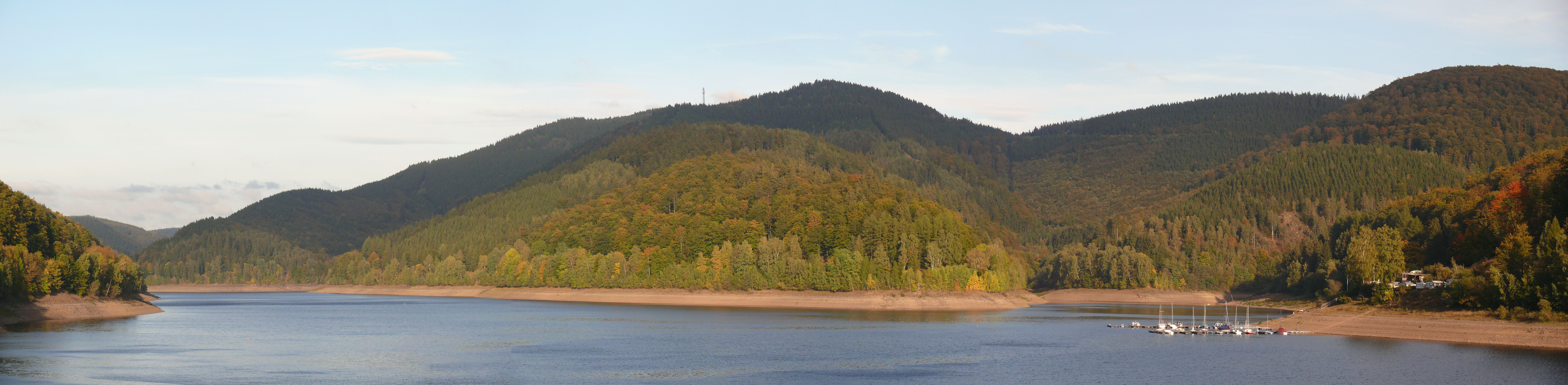
- View of the Stöberhai (centre) from the dam on the Oder Reservoir

Highest point
- Elevation: 720 m above sea level (NN) (2,360 ft)
- Coordinates: 51°39′27″N 10°32′54″E

Geography
- Location within Lower Saxony
- Location: Lower Saxony, Germany
- Parent range: Harz Mountains

Climbing
- Access: 1872–1980 Tavern and hotel 1957–1992 Military outpost 1967–2005 Surveillance tower

The Stöberhai is a mountain the Harz highlands in Central Germany, immediately south of the Oder Dam and northwest of Wieda. At a height of 720 m above sea level (NN) it is the highest mountain in the South Harz. The origin of the name is uncertain, but it is suggested, that a charcoal burner called Stöber may have had his charcoal store (Hai) here.

== Etymology ==
The origin of the name Stöberhai is not documented. It may have been that a charcoal burner named Stöber had his Hai here, which in the Harz Mountains referred to the charcoal burner's site in the forest. The term is derived from Hain (grove, which also coincides with the previously attested use of the Stöberhai as a forest clearing. A guide of the climatic health resort of Wieda in 1931 still recognises an "Upper Hai" on the mountain with a view of Hohegeiss. Attempts were made by the former master forester (Forstmeister) of Wieda, Stein, to prove the existence of a charcoal burner called Stöber, based on old documents and researching the neighbouring Prussian forestry departments, were unsuccessful.

== Geography ==
=== Location ===
The Stöberhai is located in the Harz Mountains, the highest mountain range in Northern Germany, and in the Harz Nature Park. It rises between the Oder Reservoir on the Oder river in the west and north-west and the village of Wieda on the Wieda stream in the southeast. A little west-southwest of the summit, the Steina stream (also Steinaer Bach) has its source where the mountain transitions to the Jagdkopf (701.2 m). The lower part of the mountain is mainly covered with beech forest, the upper part with dark stands of spruce.

=== Height ===
In older literature, the height is given as 731 m; and sometimes as 718 m. In fact the height of the East Top (51°39′22.82″N 10°33′16.1″E) is 714 m and that of the West Top (51°39′27.5″N 10°32′50.5″E), about 500m WNW of the main summit, is 699 m. The latter refers to an eminence along a trail to the east below the summit. A signpost on summit (East Top) give the height as 720 m.

== Hotel ==
In 1872 the first tavern was built by a publican from Wieda on the mountain top, but it was destroyed thereafter by a fire. In 1889 the Berghotel Stöberhai was built along with an observation tower. During the Second World War it was hit by five bombs in 1943 during an air raid. In the winter of 1943/44 the German Wehrmacht troops seized it for use as a ski training centre and in the following summer it was made available for those blinded in both world wars together with their families.

After the war the inter-zone bus company of P. Kühn from Berlin bought the hotel and established a regular shuttle bus service between Berlin and the Stöberhai. At the hotel was a small animal park with native wild animals. In 1980 the now empty hotel was the victim of a major fire and was never rebuilt. Its floor plate and a few old chairs were still around as evidence of the former hotel until the mid-1980s. The area was finally cleared up and a signpost erected in the middle. A small refuge hut was also built on the edge of the summit plateau - with views of Sankt Andreasberg, the Oder valley and the mountains of Achtermann, Wurmberg and Brocken.

== Surveillance tower ==
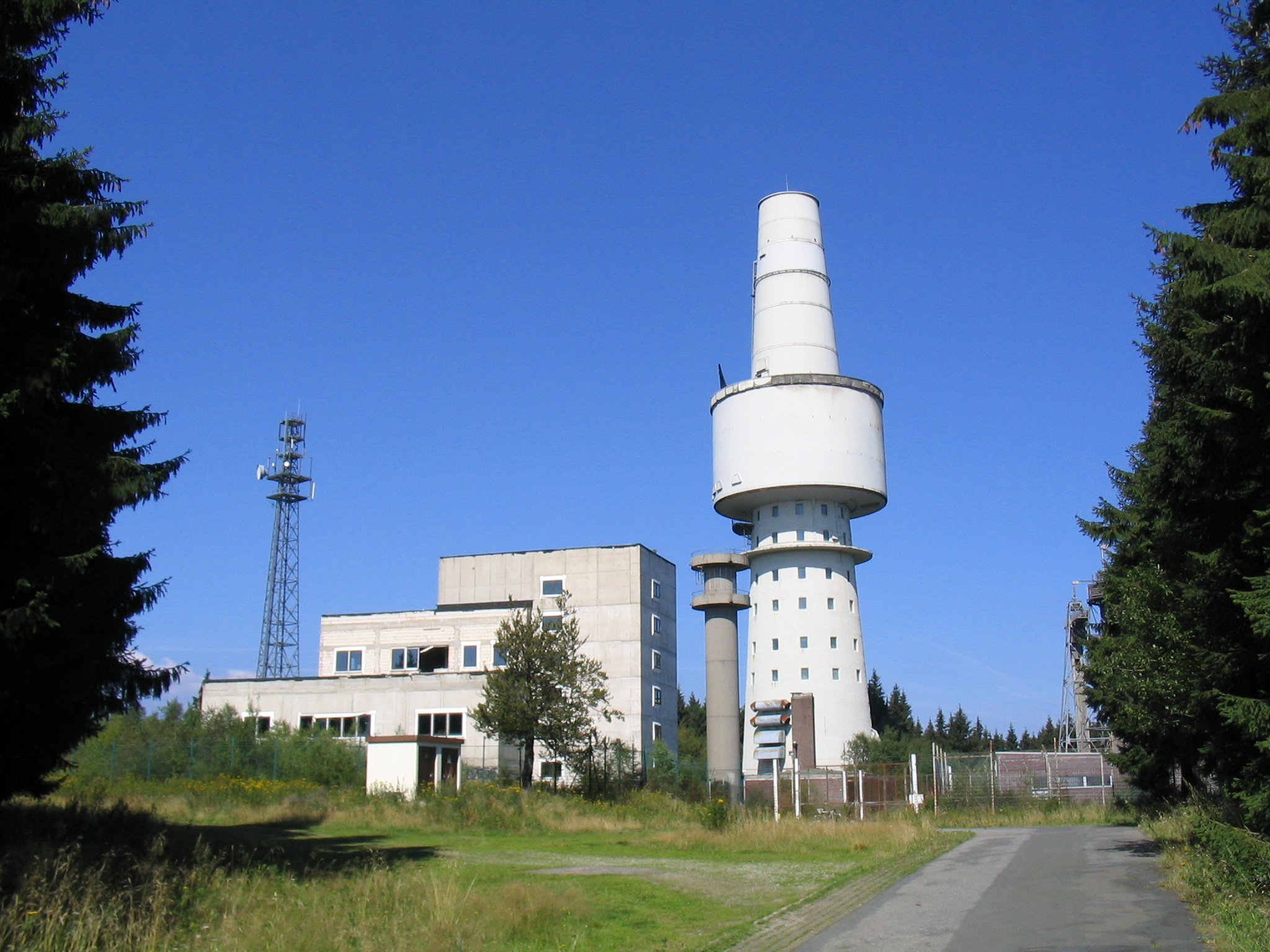
The old listening post in 2004

The Stöberhai gained a degree of fame as a result of the electronic surveillance tower built as a NATO listening post. This signals intelligence facility was used during the Cold War to listen into military radio traffic in East Germany. The facilities installed here were the equivalent of the station operated by the Stasi and Soviet Union on the Brocken.

Initially the Bundeswehr built the Wieda outpost (Dienststelle Wieda) in 1957. Six years later the French Armed Forces followed. The installations were continually expanded. With the completion of the 75 metres (246 ft) high concrete tower in 1967 the complex was formally transferred to the Luftwaffe's Communication Sector C (Fernmeldesektor C). The tower, the heart of the complex, had sixteen floors and a floor area of 750 square metres (8,100 sq ft) as well as antenna mountings, intelligence-gathering rooms and service rooms, but also offices, accommodation and a mess. The tower was linked to other buildings and an underground nuclear bomb shelter with alternate command post by a tunnel, which prevented observation as well as icing.

Although 14 million DM was invested in a never-completed upgrade during the time of German reunification, the military finally pulled out in 1992. On the summit plateau, which has an area of 28 hectares (69 acres), there is at present, in addition to the tower and ruins, an entrance building, a German accommodation block with its own nuclear bunker in the cellars, several garages and workshops, two French quarters, a French operations building and four French lattice towers for electronic intelligence gathering which still carry eastwards-facing antennas.

In the years after its closure the out-of-bounds area grew into a popular (illegal) adventure playground for various leisure sports. It gained a legendary reputation for geocaching. After years of dispute between the district and the Federal Government over the demolition costs of 3.5 million euros the Government had to bear the costs. The tower was brought down in a controlled demolition on 23 September 2005 with 38 kilograms (84 lb) of explosive (Gelamon 30 U) placed in 380 demolition holes.

The massive surveillance tower once made the Stöberhai a very prominent feature with the Harz mountains. All that is left is a comparatively small transmission tower, which is visible from Sankt Andreasberg and the surrounding mountains.

On 23 September 2006 –exactly a year after the demolition of the concrete tower –Lower Saxony's Finance Minister, Hartmut Möllring, opened a monument commemorating the tower and electronic warfare in general.

== Walks ==
With the exception of the northern side, which is closed off by the Oder Reservoir, the Stöberhai is easily accessible on all sides by a number of paths. Its main access route is the tarmac road, closed to the public, that runs from Wieda up to the Stöberhai. At one time another metalled road ran from Bad Lauterberg to the summit. However, the financial means that had actually been set aside for the demolition of the observation tower were enough to completely destroy this road as well. The old tarmac surface was replaced by a very rough ballast covering that even mountain bikes have difficulty negotiating. Considerably easier for bicycles is the long, slow path along the Steina, a stream that rises on the southern side of the summit. A much steeper trail runs from Weinglastal near the former Stöberhai station up to the summit. The higher access paths are crisscrossed and linked by numerous equally negotiable branching routes.

The Stöberhai is checkpoint no. 159 in the Harzer Wandernadel hiking network.

== See also ==
- List of mountains and hills in Lower Saxony
- List of mountains in the Harz
- Schneeberg (Fichtel Mountains) (Communication sector E)
- Hoher Bogen (Communication sector F).
