= Grade Lutter =

River in Germany

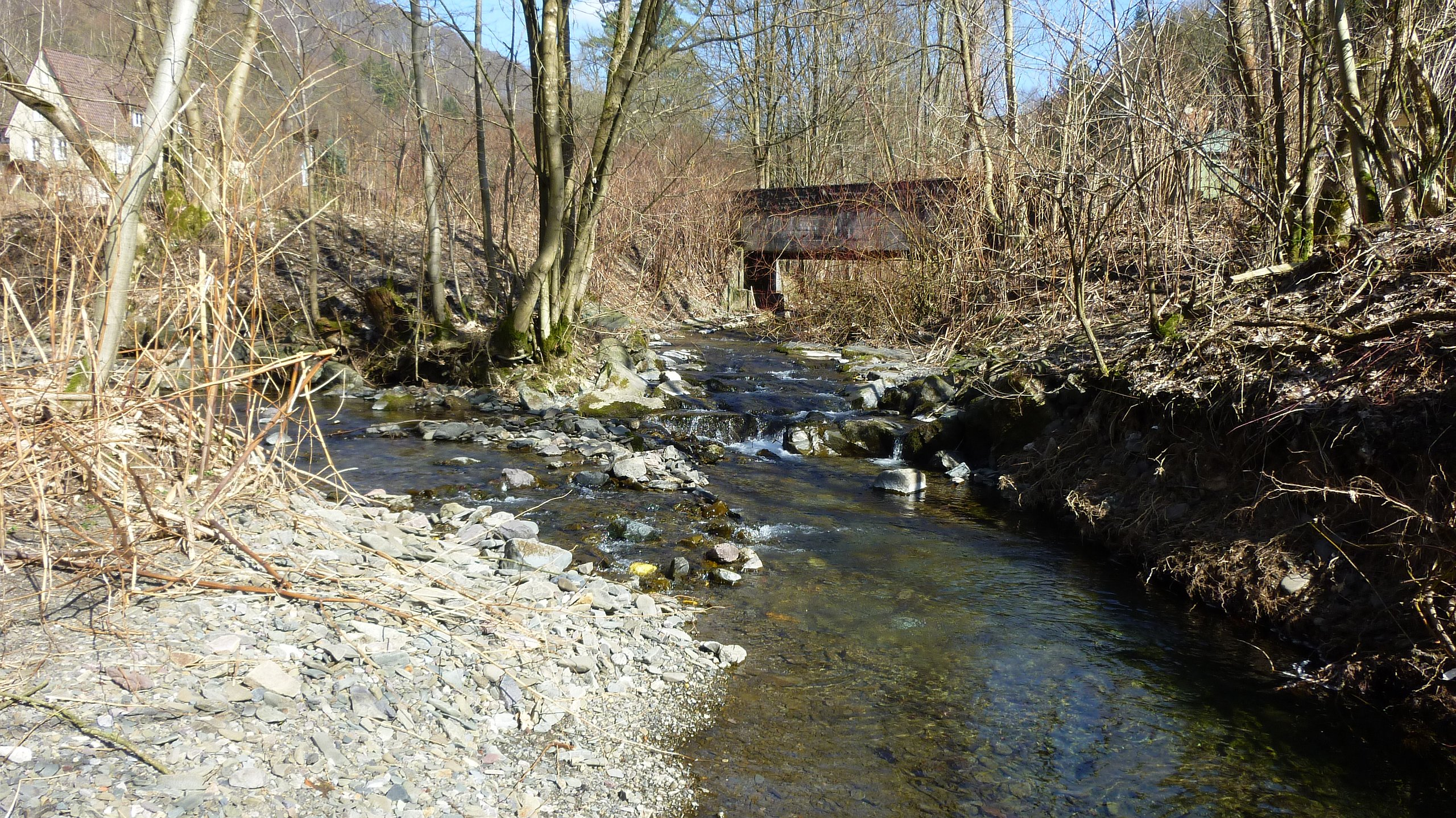
- Confluence of the Grade Lutter (l) and Krumme Lutter (r) north of Bad Lauterberg

Location
- Country: Germany
- State: Lower Saxony
- Location: North of Bad Lauterberg in Göttingen district

Physical characteristics
- Source
  - elevation: over 660 m
- Mouth
  - location: Confluence: with the Krumme Lutter to form the Lutter
  - coordinates: 51°38′33″N 10°27′36″E
  - elevation: 316 m
- Length: 5.9 km
- Basin size: 8.3 km^{2} (3.2 sq mi)

Basin features
- Progression: Lutter→ Oder→ Rhume→ Leine→ Aller→ Weser→ North Sea
- Tributaries
  - right: Ziegenkappe and Übelsbach

The Grade Lutter is a river of Lower Saxony, Germany.

It is one of the two headstreams of the River Lutter in the South Harz. It rises at over 660 metres on the Aschentalshalbe. It then flows mainly in a southerly direction in order to merge with the Krumme Lutter near the district Kupferhütte of Bad Lauterberg to form the Lutter.

== See also ==
- List of rivers of Lower Saxony

== Sources ==
- Topographische Karte 1:25000, Nr. 4328 Bad Lauterberg im Harz
