= Krumme Lutter =

River in Germany

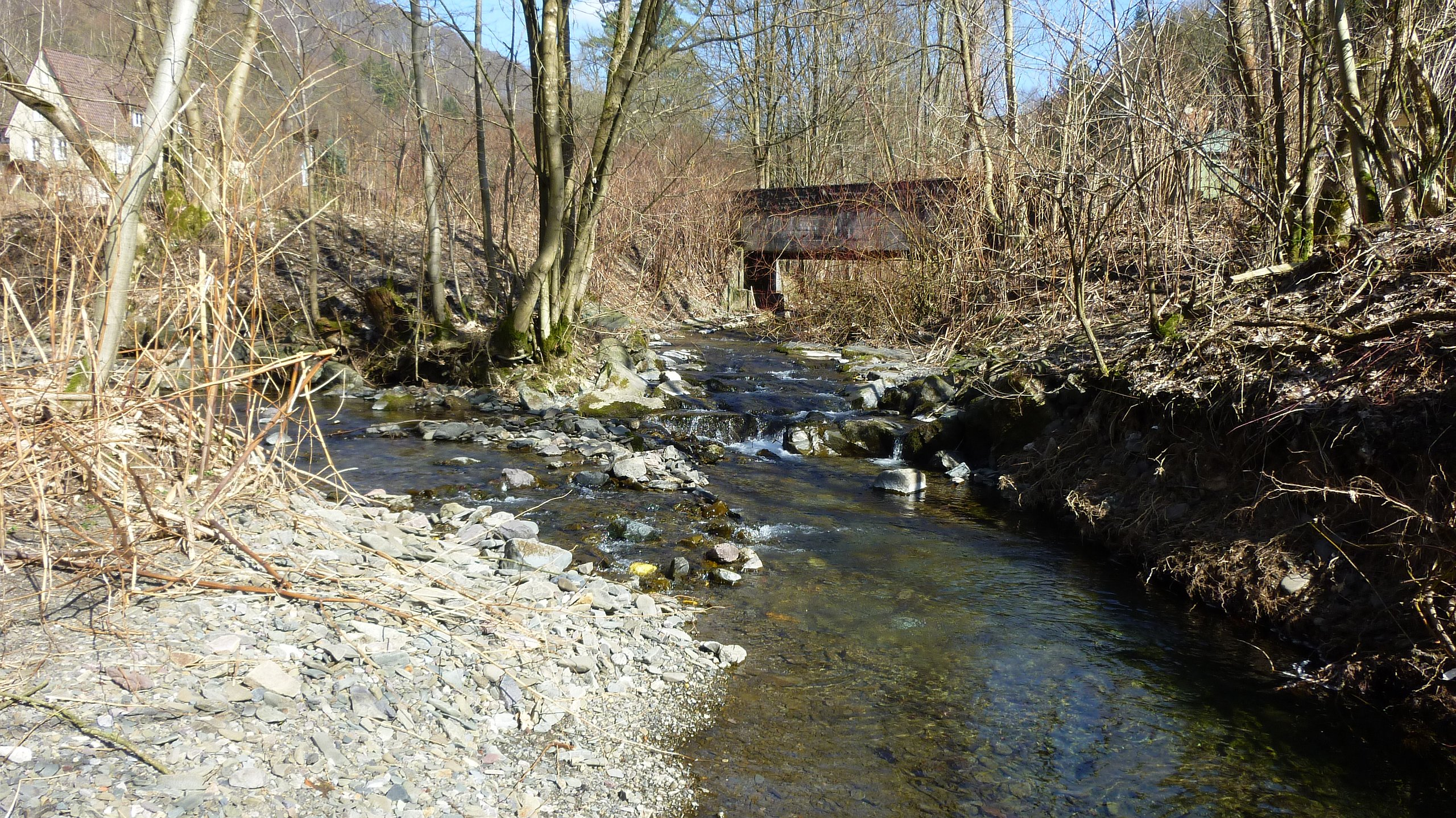
- Confluence of the Grade Lutter (l) and Krumme Lutter (r) north of Bad Lauterberg

Location
- Country: Germany
- State: Lower Saxony
- Location: north of Bad Lauterberg in the Harz Mountains

Physical characteristics
- Source
  - elevation: under 620 m
- Mouth
  - location: confluence: of the Grade Lutter and the Lutter in Kupferhütte
  - coordinates: 51°38′33″N 10°27′36″E
  - elevation: 316 m
- Length: 6.3 km (3.9 mi)
- Basin size: 7 km^{2} (2.7 sq mi)

Basin features
- Progression: Lutter→ Oder→ Rhume→ Leine→ Aller→ Weser→ North Sea
- Tributaries
  - right: Schadenbeek

Krumme Lutter is a river of Lower Saxony, Germany.

The Krumme Lutter is one of the two headstreams of the Lutter in the southern Harz, north of Bad Lauterberg in the district of Göttingen. It rises below 620 m on the Aschentalshalbe and flows towards the south past the former pits Wolkenhügel and Hoher Trost, before it unites with the Grade Lutter in Kupferhütte to become the Lutter.

== See also ==
- List of rivers of Lower Saxony
