= Oder Dam =

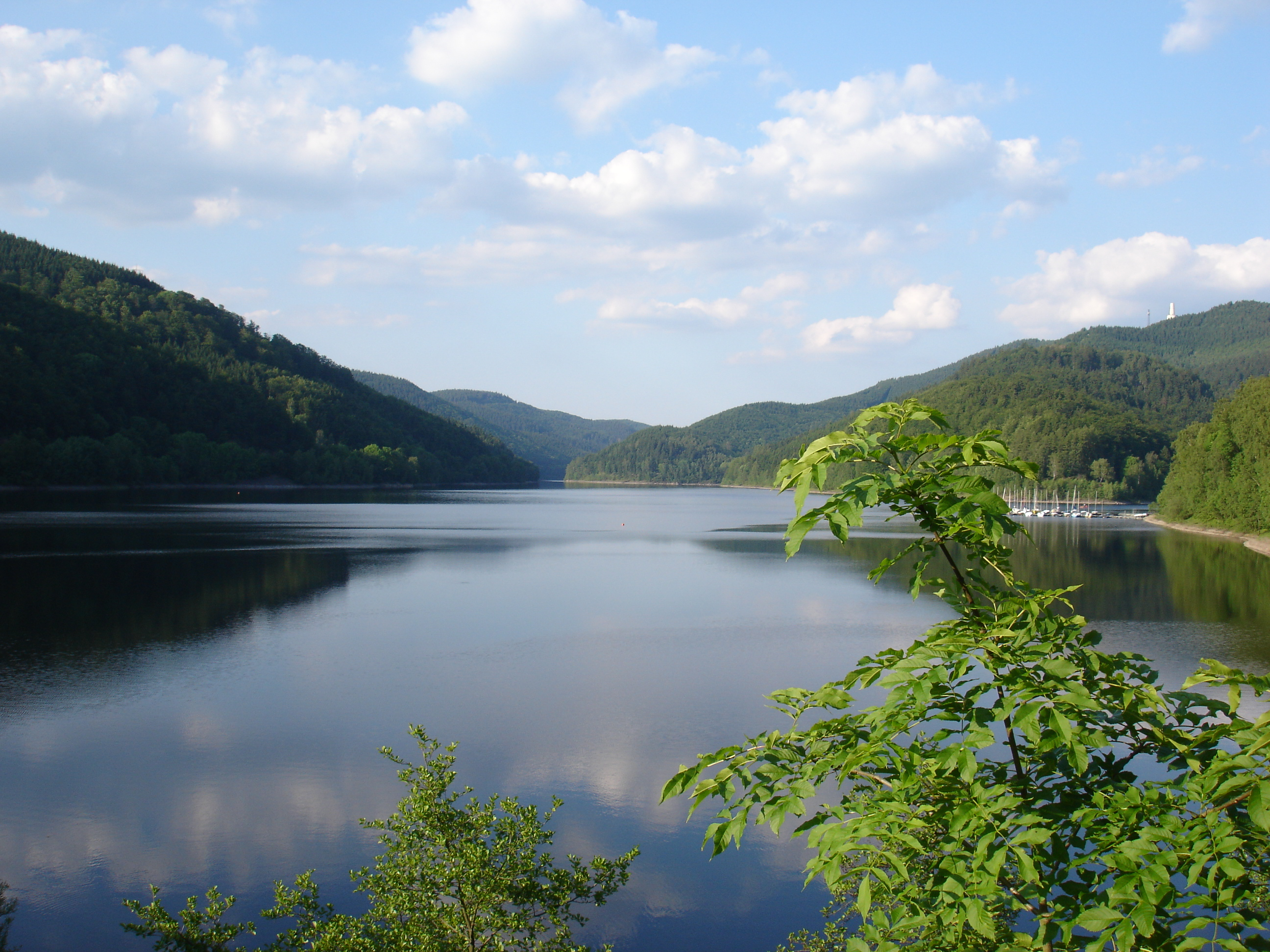

- Location within Germany
- Official name: Odertalsperre
- Country: Germany
- Location: district of Göttingen
- Coordinates: 51°39′02″N 10°30′57″E
- Construction began: 1930
- Opening date: 1933

Dam and spillways
- Type of dam: Embankment dam
- Height: 62 m (203 ft)
- Length: 316 m (1,037 ft)
- Width (crest): 8.65 m (28.4 ft)
- Dam volume: 1.4×10^{6} m^{3} (49×10^{6} cu ft)

Reservoir
- Total capacity: 31.85×10^{6} m^{3} (1.125×10^{9} cu ft)
- Catchment area: 52 km^{2} (20 sq mi)
- Surface area: 136 ha (340 acres)

Power Station
- Decommission date: 1990s
- Type: Pumped-storage
- Turbines: 2
- Installed capacity: 6.2 MW

The Oder Dam (German: Odertalsperre) is a dam in the Harz mountains of Germany. It lies above Bad Lauterberg in the district of Göttingen in Lower Saxony and impounds the river Oder. The dam went into service in 1934 after taking 3 years to build. The owner and operator of the Oder Dam is the Harzwasserwerke.

== Purposes ==
The reservoir serves the following purposes:

- Flood protection
- Low water regulation
- Power generation

These functions sometimes create conflicting demands. For flood protection, the reservoir should be as empty as possible; for low water regulation, it is desirable that the reservoir is as full as possible. Accordingly, there are for the water economy an operating plan that is dependent on the time of year and the expected water quantities. e.g. snow meltwaters at the end of winter, droughts in summer.

== Dam ==
The actual barrage is an embankment dam made of rubble (crushed stone) with a central concrete core and a grout curtain of clay. The concrete wall has joints that follow the shape of the whole dam, without leaking. The design is very similar in many respects to the Söse Dam built shortly beforehand.

== Pumped storage hydro-electric power station ==
The reservoir of the dam originally acted as the upper reservoir of the pumped-storage power station. Immediately below the dam is the lower reservoir with a 7.5 m high earth dam that acted as a stilling basin. The power station is also located at the foot of the dam. It has 2 turbines with a combined output of 5.04 MW (possibly as much as 6.2 MW). The pumped-storage facility has not been used since the 1990s as it was no longer economical. The power station now operates simply as a storage power station with a Francis turbine.

== Upgrades ==
The dam was rehabilitated from 2010 to 2018.

== Tourism ==
The lake is open to watersports such as angling, sailing and surfing. There is also a local restaurant and a campsite."Angeln im Harz" (in German). Archived from the original on 2022-11-28.

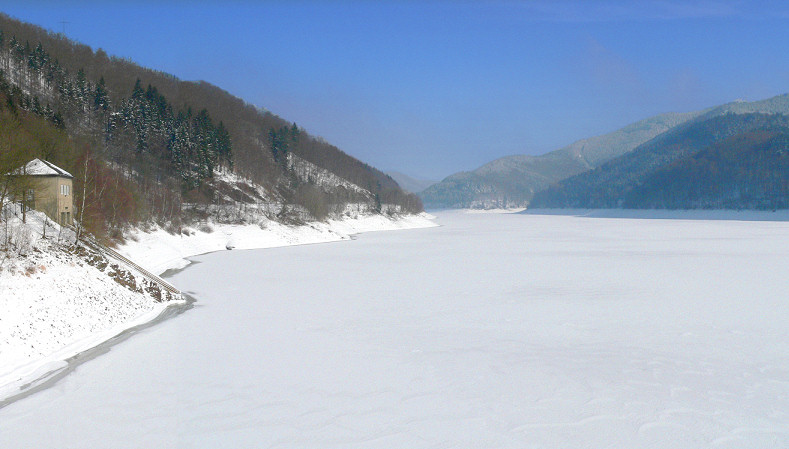
Oder Reservoir in winter, seen from the dam

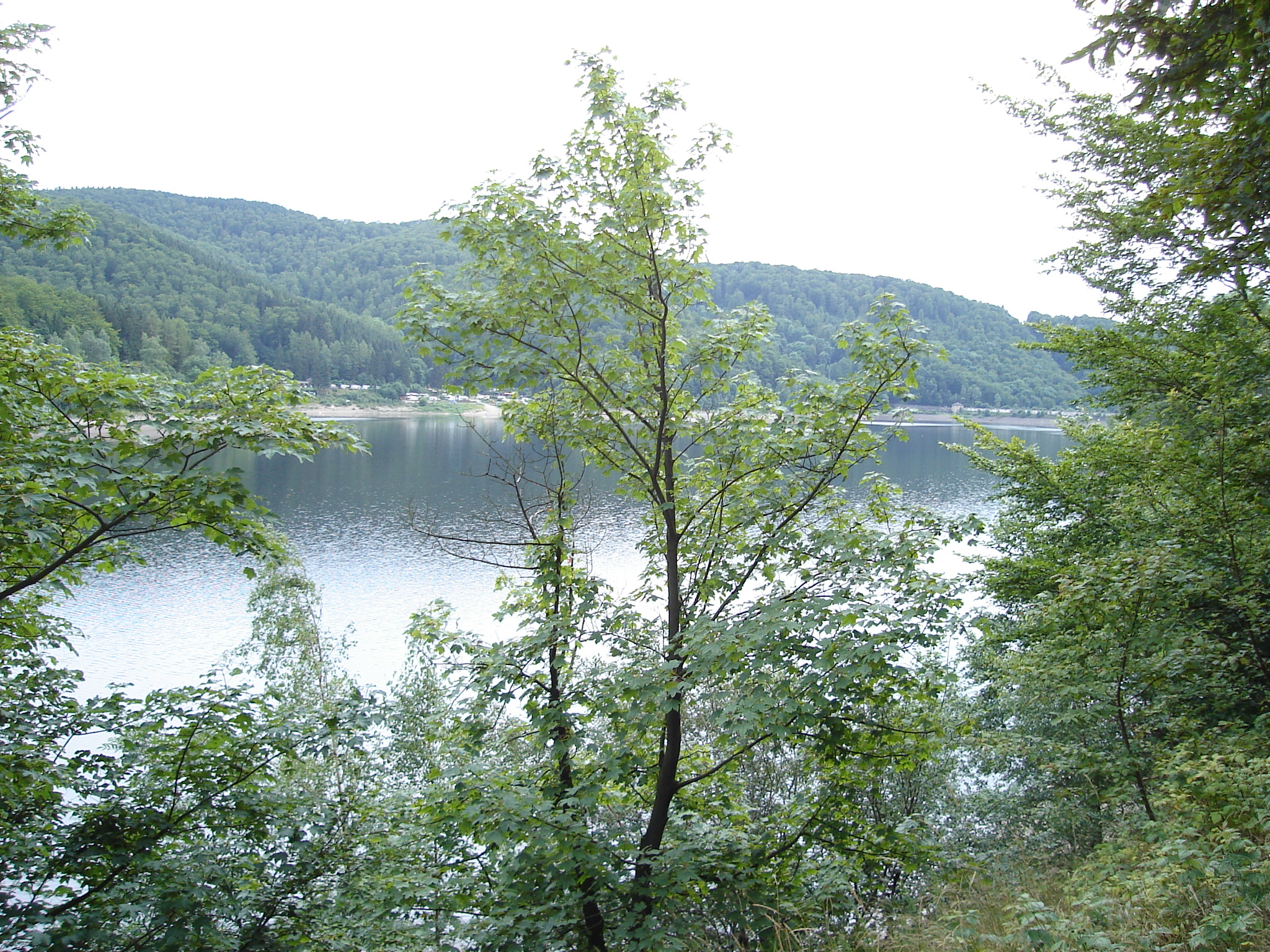
View over the Oder Reservoir

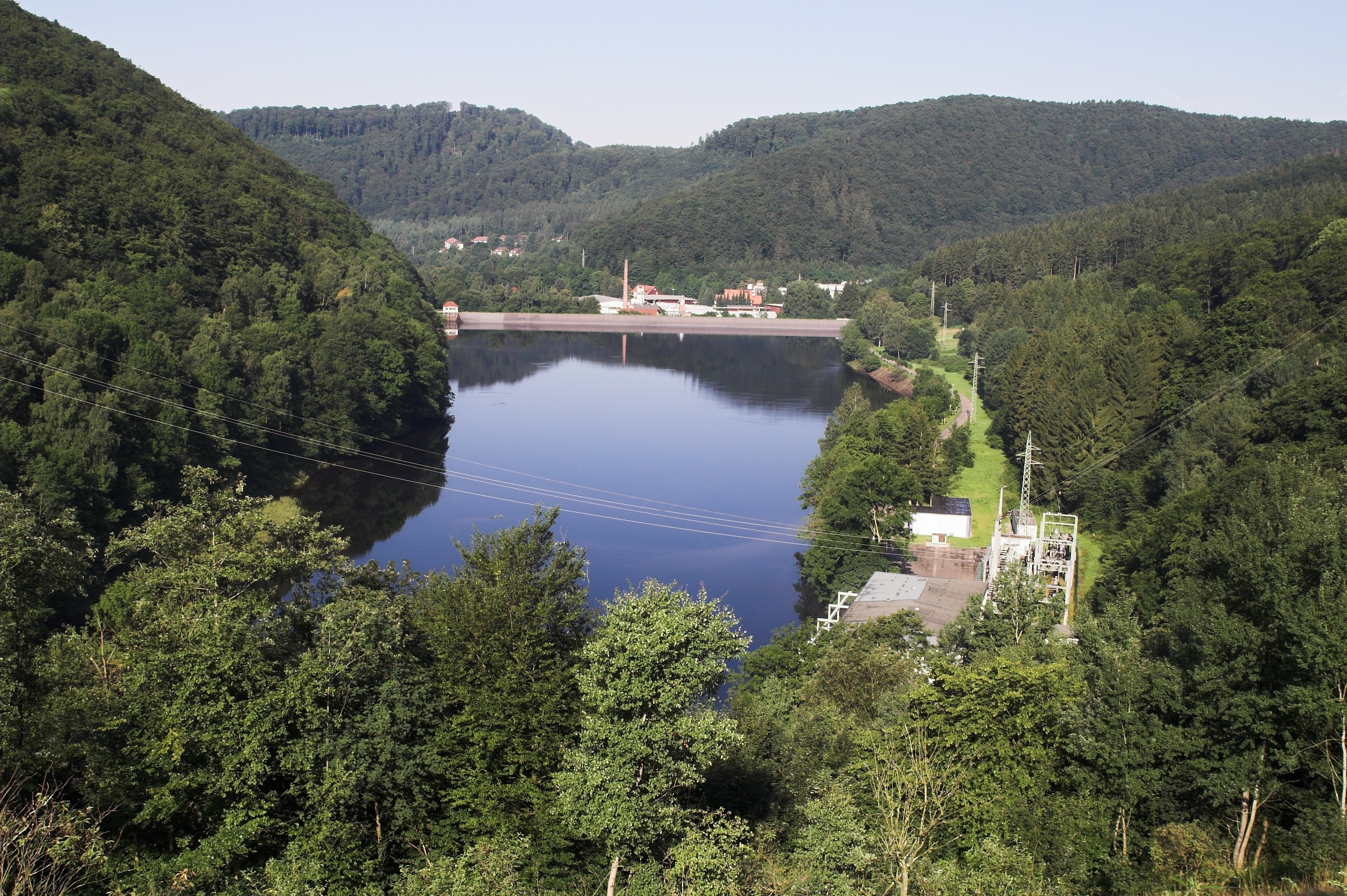
View from the reservoir down to the stilling basin

== See also ==
- List of dams in the Harz
- List of reservoirs and dams in Germany
- Pumped-storage hydroelectricity
- Oderteich
