= Frank Götzke =

German automotive engineer

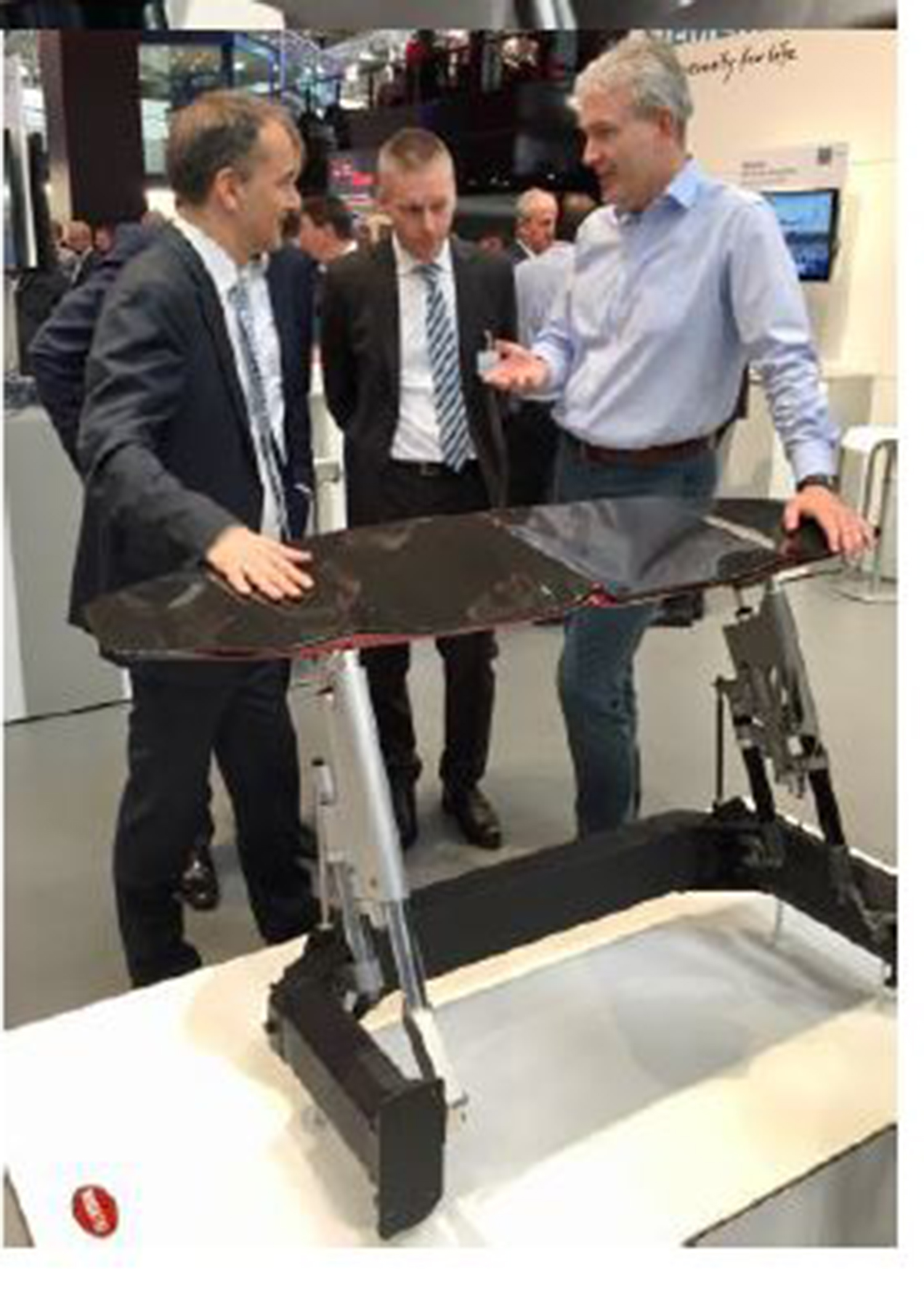
Siemens chairman of the board Jim Hagemann Snabe, Siemens CEO Digital Factory Jan Mrosik and Frank Götzke at the Hanover Industry Fair 2018

Frank Götzke (born 18 June 1969) is a German engineer and technology manager. His creations include the Bugatti Veyron, Bugatti Chiron and Bugatti Bolide. He is known for his metallic 3D printing creations. He is considered to be a pioneer in the field of carbon-fiber-reinforced structural and functional parts, which are manufactured with resin infiltration processes. Götzke has been a member of the Volkswagen Group since 1995, and he has worked for its super car brand Bugatti since 2001.

== Career ==
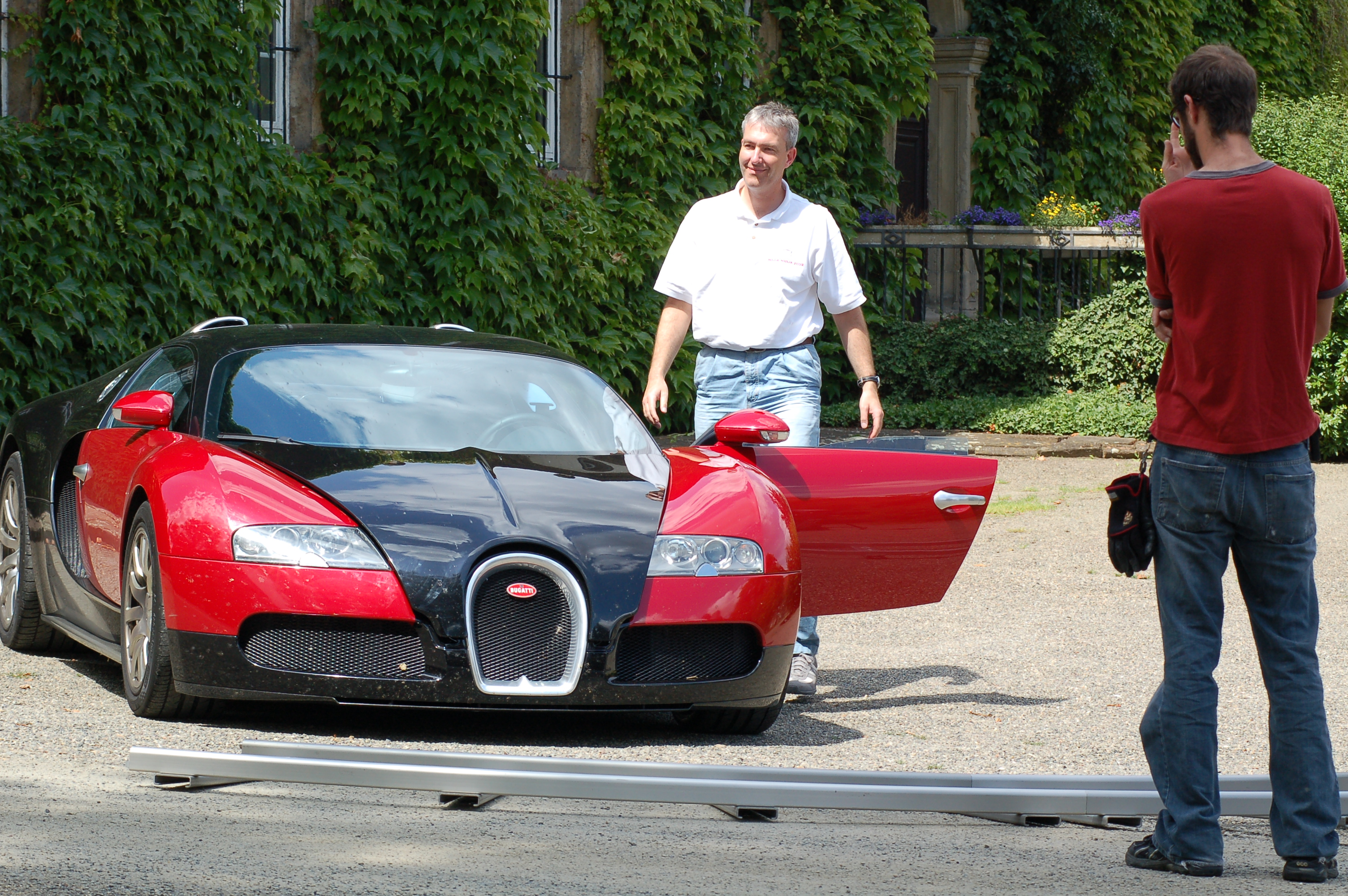
Götzke during the shooting of the National Geographic's film of the Bugatti Veyron in 2009

After graduating from high school in 1989, Frank Götzke spent his military service at Stöberhai, a listening outpost of the German Armed Forces. After that, he studied mechanical engineering at the Technical University Carolo Wilhelmina zu Braunschweig. He specialized in the field of machine tools and manufacturing technologies, and he completed his studies in 1994.

He began working in the consulting business at IAP GmbH where he primarily dealt with plant engineering projects and organizational planning in the fields of rail vehicle construction, the aviation industries, and constructional machinery industries. He was responsible for the planning and development of the flexibly automated Lost-Foam, casting plants at Volkswagen Hanover.

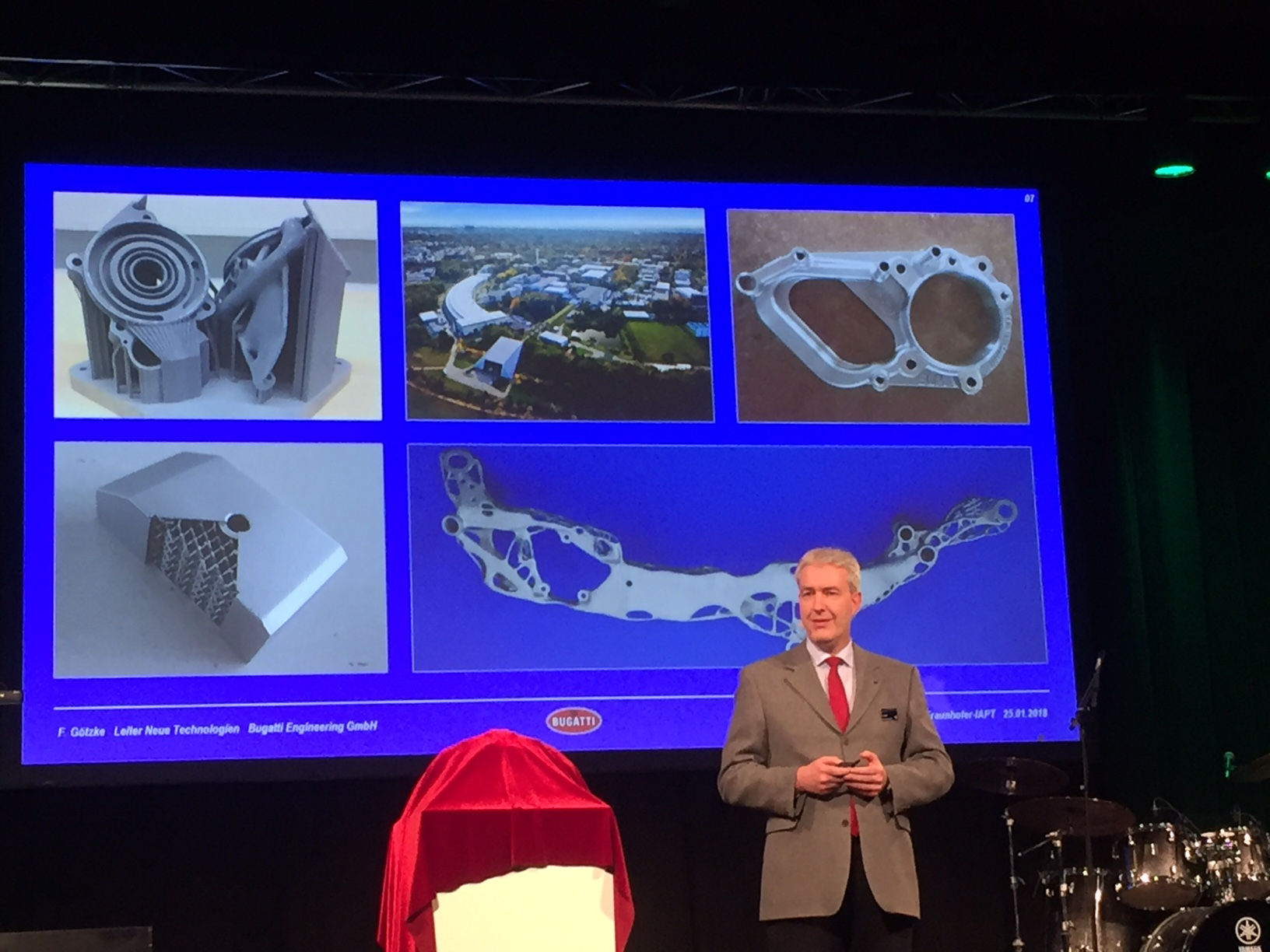
Götzke as one of the main speakers at the Welcome Fraunhofer-IAPT event in Hamburg, in January 2018

In 1995, he joined Volkswagen Group's department of Technical Development where he has held various leadership positions. This era marks his contact to the former Volkswagen CEO Ferdinand Piëch, who employed Götzke as one of the first persons in the newly founded sports car brand Bugatti in June 2001. In the following years, Götzke led the department of car development.

Currently, he is the head of special projects and new technologies. He is responsible for the key activities of materials and manufacturing processes, calculation and simulation, patent and innovation systems, and the pre-development of entire vehicles and its components.

== Fields of activity ==
In addition to the creation of the basic concepts of three modern Bugatti vehicles (Veyron, Chiron, and Bolide), Götzke is behind many different technological achievements:

- Development and series applications of parts manufactured by Tailored-Fiberplacement processes
- CSiC high-performance brake discs in a series application for automotive purposes
- Application of native spider silk for both automotive and medical purposes and in cooperation with the MHH
- Carbon based nano-tubes in cooperation with the Leibnitz Institute for Theoretical Solid-state Physics
- Lightweight construction pushrod made out of carbon fiber compound
- Caliper made out of titanium as the biggest titanium-3D-printing part in the world
- Closed development and manufacturing environment for 3D-printing parts
- Biggest hybrid functional assembly consisting of 3D-printed titanium combined with carbon fiber compound parts manufactured with maximum temperature bismaleimide-resin
