= Litter (disambiguation) =

Litter is trash in small portions thrown inappropriately in a public place.

Litter may refer to:

== Places ==
- Litter, Pulwama, a tehsil in Jammu and Kashmir, India
- Litter, a civil parish in the barony of Fermoy, County Cork, Ireland

== Animals ==
- Litter (zoology), a group of mammals born of the same pregnancy
- Bedding (animals), or litter, material strewn in an animal's enclosure for it to sleep on and to absorb feces and urine
- Cat litter, or "kitty litter", loose, absorbent material as part of the indoor feces and urine disposal system for pets

== Other uses ==
- Litter (rescue basket), a basket-like stretcher device used to ferry injured people
- Litter (vehicle), a piece of furniture mounted on a platform and carried by (usually human) muscle power
- Plant litter, dead plant material that has fallen to the ground
- The Litter, a 1960s psychedelic rock band

== See also ==
- Letter (disambiguation)
- Liter
- Lotter
- Lutter (disambiguation)
