= Lutteroth =

Lutteroth is a surname. Notable people with the surname include:

- Ascan Lutteroth (1842–1923), German landscape painter; associated with the Düsseldorfer Malerschule
- Salvador Lutteroth (1897–1987), Mexican professional wrestling promoter

== See also ==
- Lutter (disambiguation)
- Lutterworth
