= Howard Lutter =

American musician and composer

Howard Lutter (1889–1959) was an American musician and composer best known for creation of player piano rolls. He was born in Newark, New Jersey, in 1889 to Hermann Lutter and Clara Uhl.

Listen to a performance of his Welte-Mignon Recording # 6991 of Golden Days played on a 1921 Baldwin C, 6'2", Welte-Mignon Reproducing Piano
