= Lutter (Oder) =

River in Lower Saxony, Germany

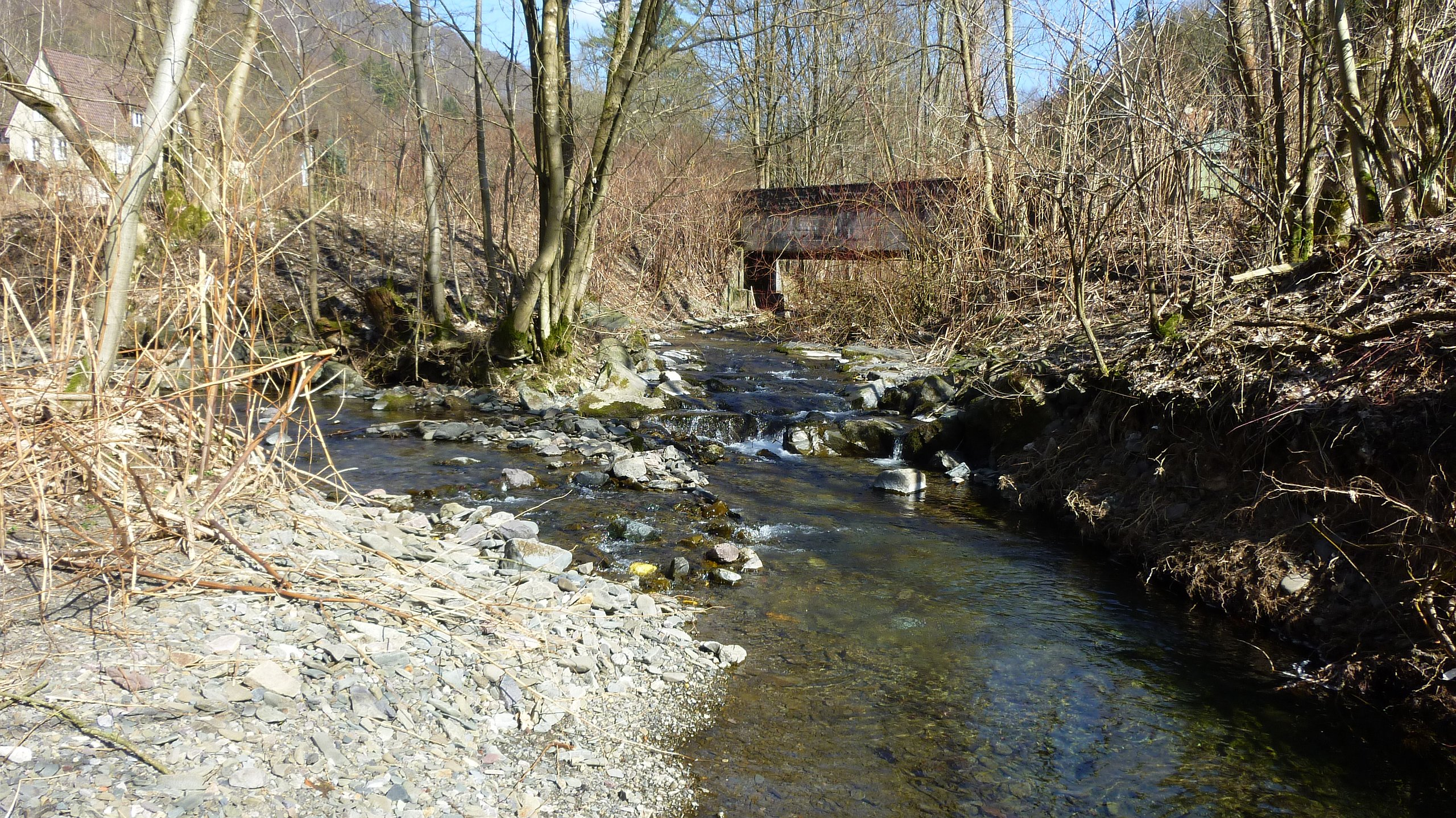

Location
- Country: Germany
- State: Lower Saxony
- Location: near Bad Lauterberg in Göttingen district

Physical characteristics
- Source
  - location: confluence: of the Grade Lutter and Krumme Lutter in Kupferhütte
  - coordinates: 51°38′33″N 10°27′36″E
  - elevation: 310 m
- Mouth
  - location: Oder
  - coordinates: 51°37′22″N 10°27′40″E
  - elevation: under 290 m
- Length: 2.2 km
- Basin size: ca. 17.6 km^{2} (6.8 sq mi)

Basin features
- Progression: Oder→ Rhume→ Leine→ Aller→ Weser→ North Sea
- Landmarks: Small towns: Bad Lauterberg
- Tributaries
  - left: Heibeek

Lutter (German pronunciation: [ˈlʊtɐ]) is a small river that flows near Bad Lauterberg in the district of Göttingen in the north German state of Lower Saxony.

The Lutter begins at the confluence of the Grade Lutter and Krumme Lutter in Kupferhütte. It is 2.2 km (1.4 mi) long and discharges into the Oder.

== See also ==
- List of rivers of Lower Saxony
