= Oderteich =

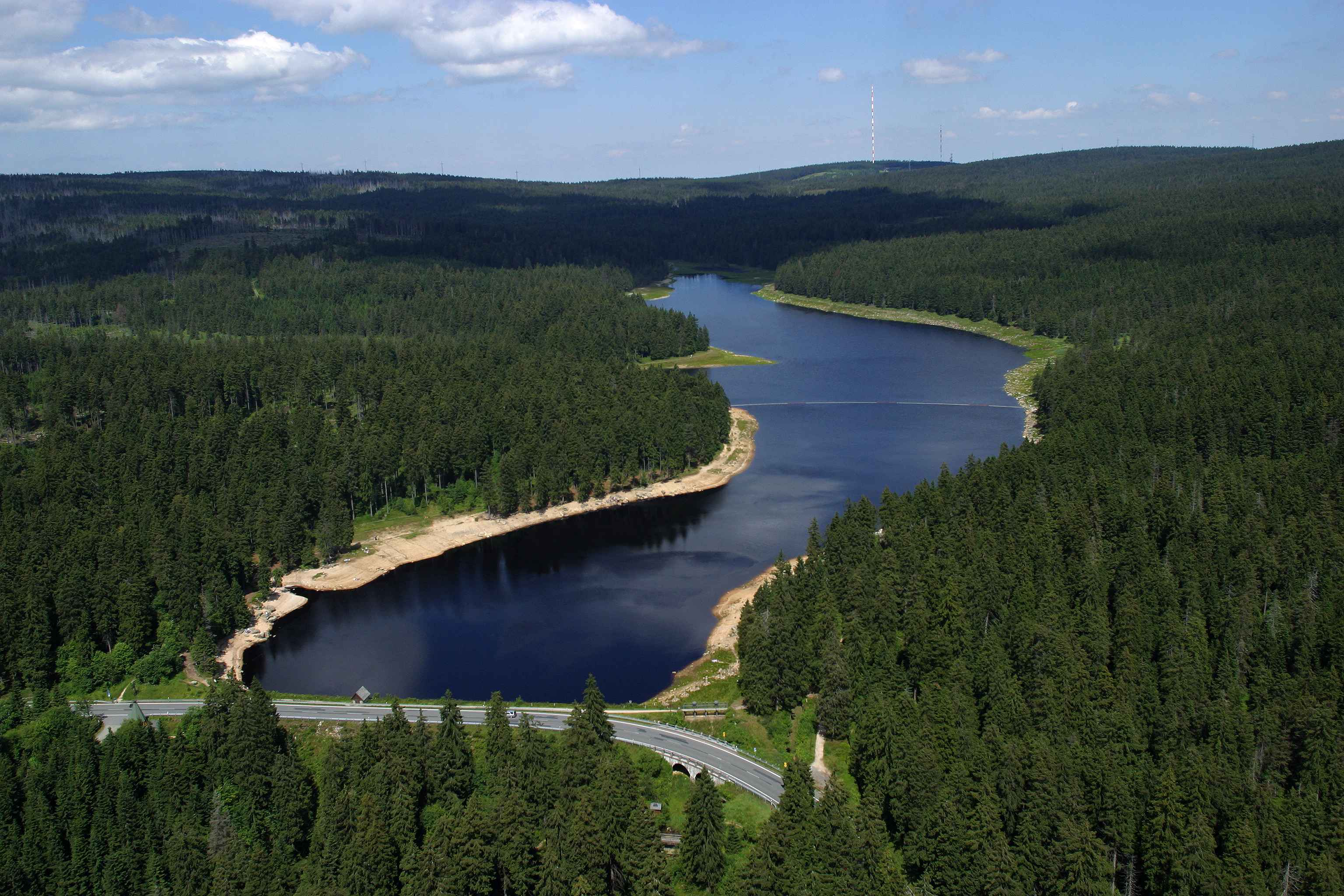
- Interactive map of Oderteich
- Country: Germany
- Location: Lower Saxony
- Coordinates: 51°46′06″N 10°32′18″E
- Construction began: 1715
- Opening date: 1722

Dam and spillways
- Height: 22 m (72 ft)
- Length: 153 m (502 ft)
- Width (crest): 16.1 m
- Dam volume: 42,000 m^{3}
- Spillway capacity: 1.83 million m^{3}

Reservoir
- Catchment area: 12.2 km^{2}
- Surface area: 30 ha

The Oderteich is an historic reservoir about seven kilometres northeast of Sankt Andreasberg in the Upper Harz in central Germany. It was built by miners from St. Andreasberg in the years 1715 to 1722 and, today, is an important component of the water supply network known as the Upper Harz Water Regale (Oberharzer Wasserregal). Moreover, for 170 years, from the time it was completed to the end of the 19th century, the Oderteich had the largest dam in Germany. The dam lies at a height of 725 m above NN by the B 242 federal highway, about a kilometre west of its intersection with the B 4.

== Purpose ==
The Oderteich was built in order to be able to deliver a reliable supply of water to the water wheels of the St. Andreasberg mine via the Rehberg Ditch, even during times of drought. Its capacity of 1.7 million cubic metres was, far and away, the largest of all the Upper Harz reservoirs at that time and was enough to cope with periods of low precipitation of up to three months.

Today the water of the Oderteich still drives several hydropower stations within its own valley, at the Samson Pit and in the Sperrlutter valley.

The dam also serves to prevent the regular flooding that happened each year in spring before the dam was built.

== History ==
In 1703 the new Rehberg Ditch was completed, diverting water from the river Oder and bringing it to St. Andreasberg. This was initially a great improvement in the supply of water power for the mines there, but the Oder could still not deliver enough water during a period of extended drought. So the call for a water reservoir quickly became shrill.

A glance at the Upper Harz 'ponds' (Teiche) near Clausthal-Zellerfeld and Hahnenklee suggested a solution. At that time there must have been 50 to 60 small reservoirs in operation. Their design, however, could not simply be copied, because there was nowhere in the vicinity of the Oderteich to cut grass sods like those used to seal the dams of the Upper Harz reservoirs.

In the meantime, the Rehberg Ditch, which had initially only been made of wooden channels (Holzgefludern), was being 'walled'; in other words the wooden conduits were being replaced by a considerably more durable artificial ditch made of earth embankments and dry stone walls. In doing so it was realised that the sand resulting from the weathering of granite, so-called granitgrus, if it was thoroughly tramped down, produced a very good seal.

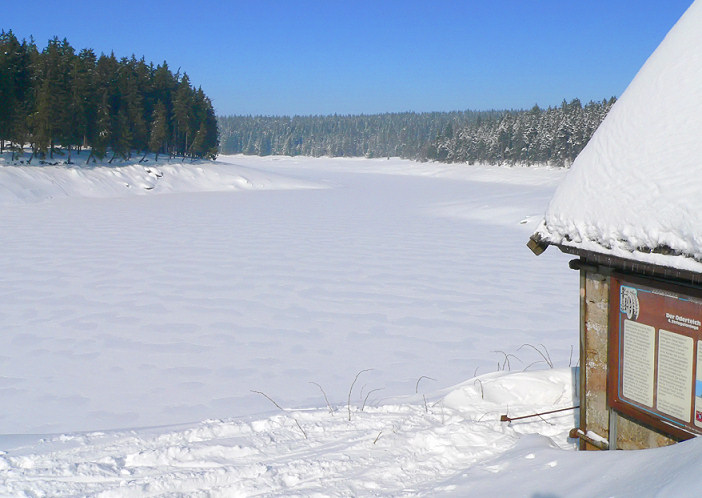
The Oderteich in winter. Right: the control hut (Striegelhaus) on the dam

In 1712, the deputy chief miner (Vizebergmeister), Caspar Dannenberger, wrote two letters to the Clausthal Mining Office, in which he proposed the construction of the Oderteich dam, sealed with granitic sand, as well as two embankments made of granite blocks. This proposal was duly taken up, but Caspar Dannenberger, the father of the Oderteich dams, did not survive to see it completed. He died on 23 April 1713.

Planning was carried out in 1714 and, on 14 September, King George Louis authorised the construction of the Oderteich dam in a most gracious special decree and made the available the sum estimated for the project: a total of 3048 thalers and 27 gl.

The construction phase actually started in early 1715. Initially a core trench was excavated into which the dam was embedded. The building material for this was excavated from the land earmarked for the future reservoir. Granite blocks needed for the up- and downstream sides of the dam were cut from small quarries; this also provided a supply of granitic sand. The mining of material for the dam enabled the future reservoir capacity to be further enlarged.

The work took until 1722. Because excess water could neither be drained through the relatively small bottom outlet during the construction period nor be impounded, a spillway had to be continuously available whilst the dam was being built. This spillway had to be laid higher and higher as the dam grew in size.

Shortly after work on the dam had started there were discussions about raising it even higher than originally planned. In 1717 it was agreed to increase its height from the initial seven Lachter to nine Lachter (roughly equating to just under 18 metres). This resulted in an increase in the dam volume of around 55 percent and a doubling of the reservoir capacity to 1.67 million cubic metres.

The cost of construction rose considerably during the build phase, not just as a result of the increase in dam height, but also other factors: in the end the Oderteich dam cost around 11,700 Reichstalers, almost four times the originally estimated and approved cost. Because the structure was so convincing, however, subsequent requests and approvals for the additional extra funding were not a problem. The three chief miners (Bergmeister) and excavation engineers (Grabensteiger) were rewarded in 1724 with bonuses ranging from 12 to 100 Talers.

The Sankt Andreasberg mine ground to a standstill in 1913. From then on the water of the Oderteich was used to generate electricity instead. It was now routed to Sankt Andreasberg itself, where it was used in several power stations and especially the Samson Pit. The water is still used for this purpose today and guarantees the economic operation and maintenance of the Oderteich and Rehberg Ditch.

In the late 1920s the Harzwasserwerke planned a further significant increase in the height of the Oderteich Dam. The dam and the geology of the surrounding area were thoroughly examined. Digging exposed the seal of granitgrus and it was confirmed that this could not easily be worked with clay picks. These plans were later shelved for reasons that are not clear, although it is likely that the project was not seen as economical.

== Design ==
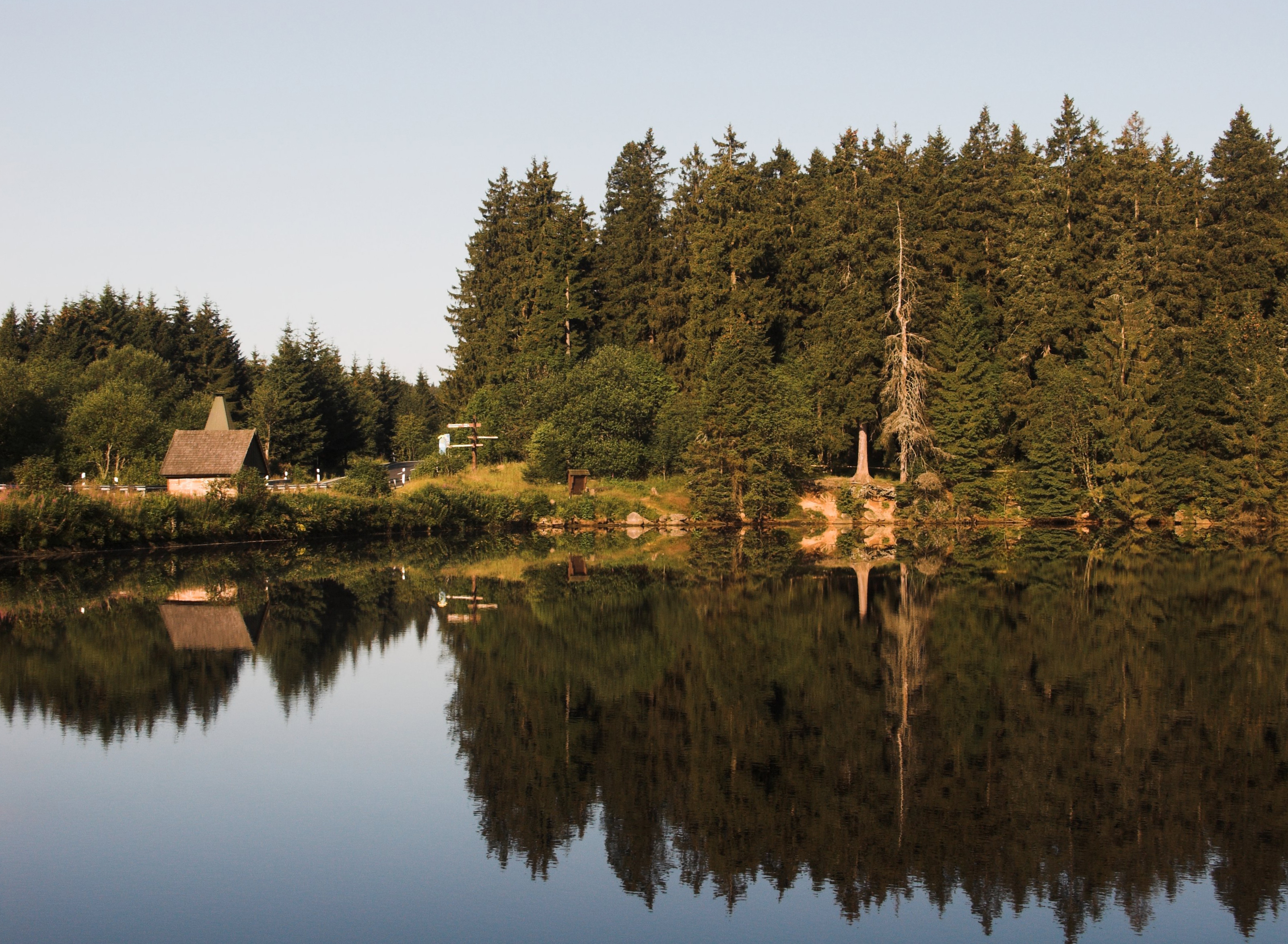
Southwest side, including the little control hut

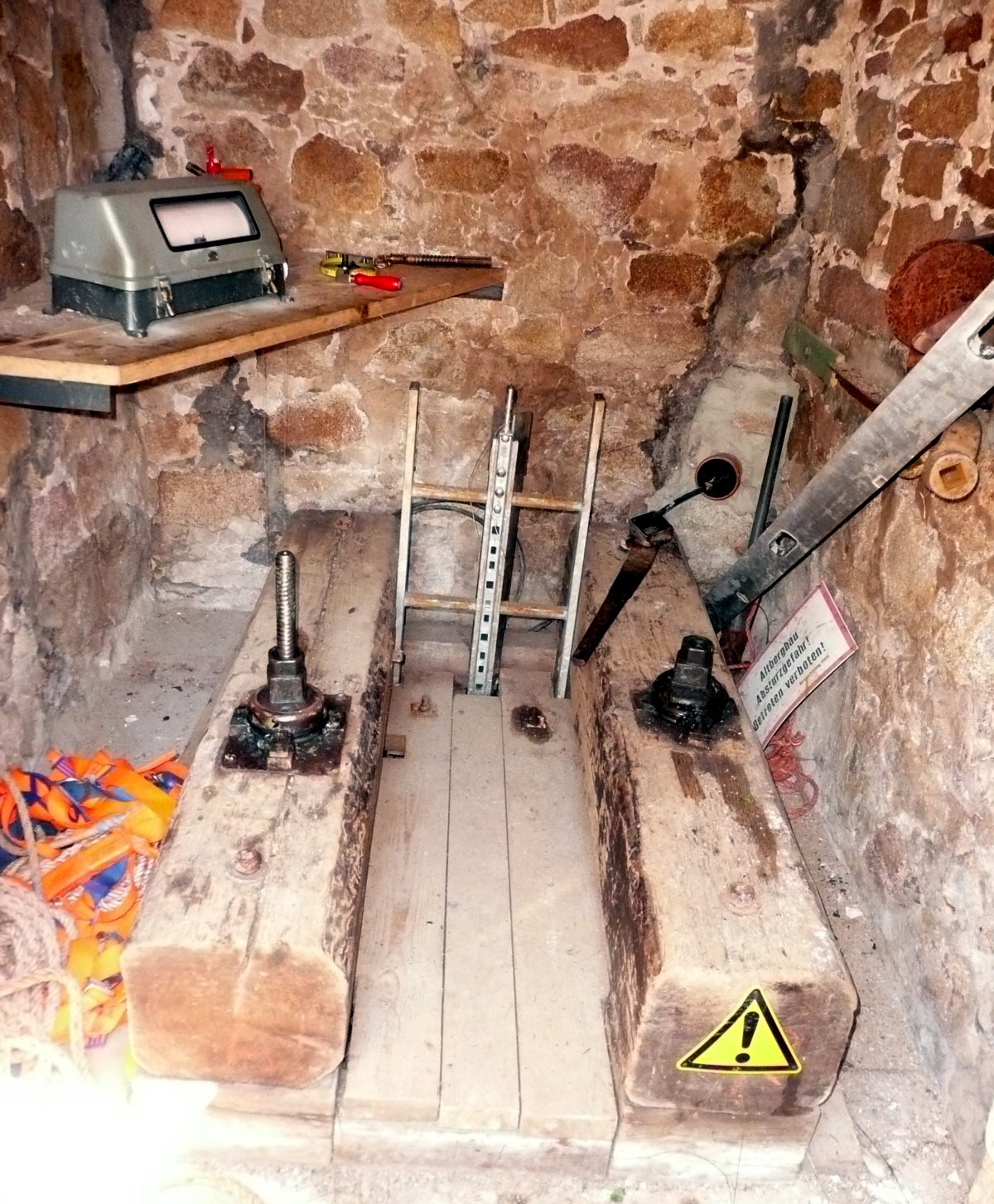
Interior of the control hut

The dam on the Oderteich differs considerably from the other dams in the Upper Harz Water Regale. The structure is clearly higher and the reservoir capacity just under three times the volume of the largest ponds around Clausthal-Zellerfeld and Hahnenklee. In addition completely different construction materials were employed.

=== Dam structure ===
In the middle of the dam is a core, up to 11.5 metres thick, made of firmly tamped down, granitic sand. Left and right of that apparently 'normal' dam fill material was used. The up- and downstream sides were given cyclopean stonework walls made of large blocks of granite with a slope of 1:0.5. On the downstream side the dam measures about 19 m from its base.

The dam wall has proved to be a very durable structure and, like the entire reservoir, is still virtually in its original condition. Fundamentally it is not quite clear whether the Oderteich dam structure is an earth-fill dam or a masonry dam. It is probably a combination of the two.

=== Outlet ===
The tendency for the Oderteich to use particularly long-lasting materials is best demonstrated in the design of the bottom outlet. At the lowest point in the valley, a shaft was let into the dam, that had a cross-section of about 1.10 × 1.20 m. This shaft is edged with large, hewn granite blocks and descends to the natural floor of the valley. From the bottom of the shaft runs a tunnel, 0.75 metres wide and 0.90 metres high into the reservoir. This tunnel enables the water in the reservoir to equalise with the water level in the shaft. From the bottom of the shaft, two wooden chutes (Holzgerenne) lead to the downstream side of the dam base. These chutes, made of oak, have a right-angled cross-section of about 25 × 25 cm and feature a valve on the bottom of the shaft that operates in a similar way to the type of bathplug that is closed from below. This valve can be pushed up or pulled shut using a rod operated from the control hut or Striegelhaus positioned above the shaft. The oak chute is designed in such a way that, even when the valve is shut, it remains submerged in water and so does not rot. This explains why the oak chutes fitted in 1715 are still being used. The entire bottom outlet design is known in the Upper Harz as a Striegel.

=== Spillway ===
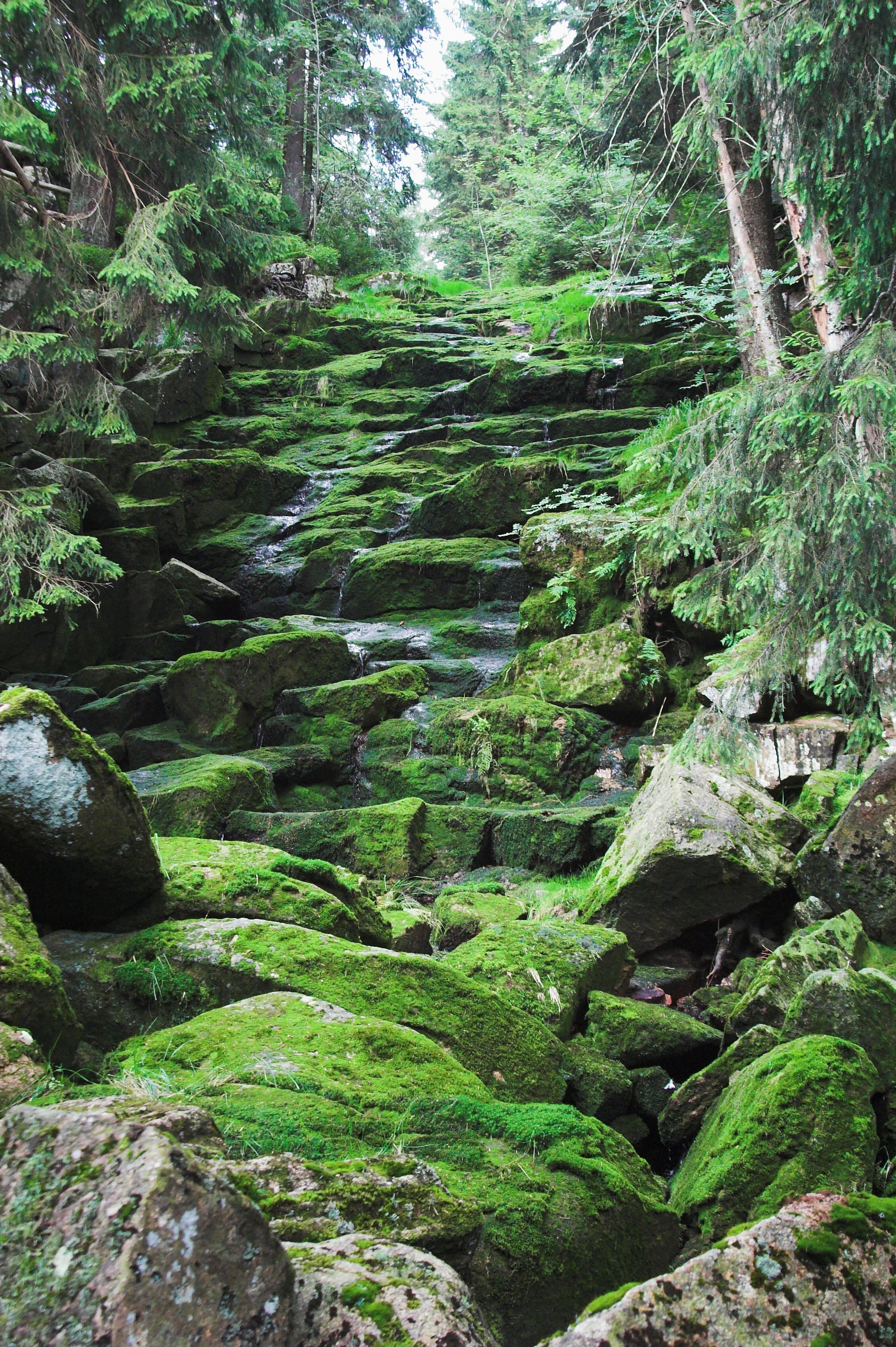
The chute of the Großer Ausflut

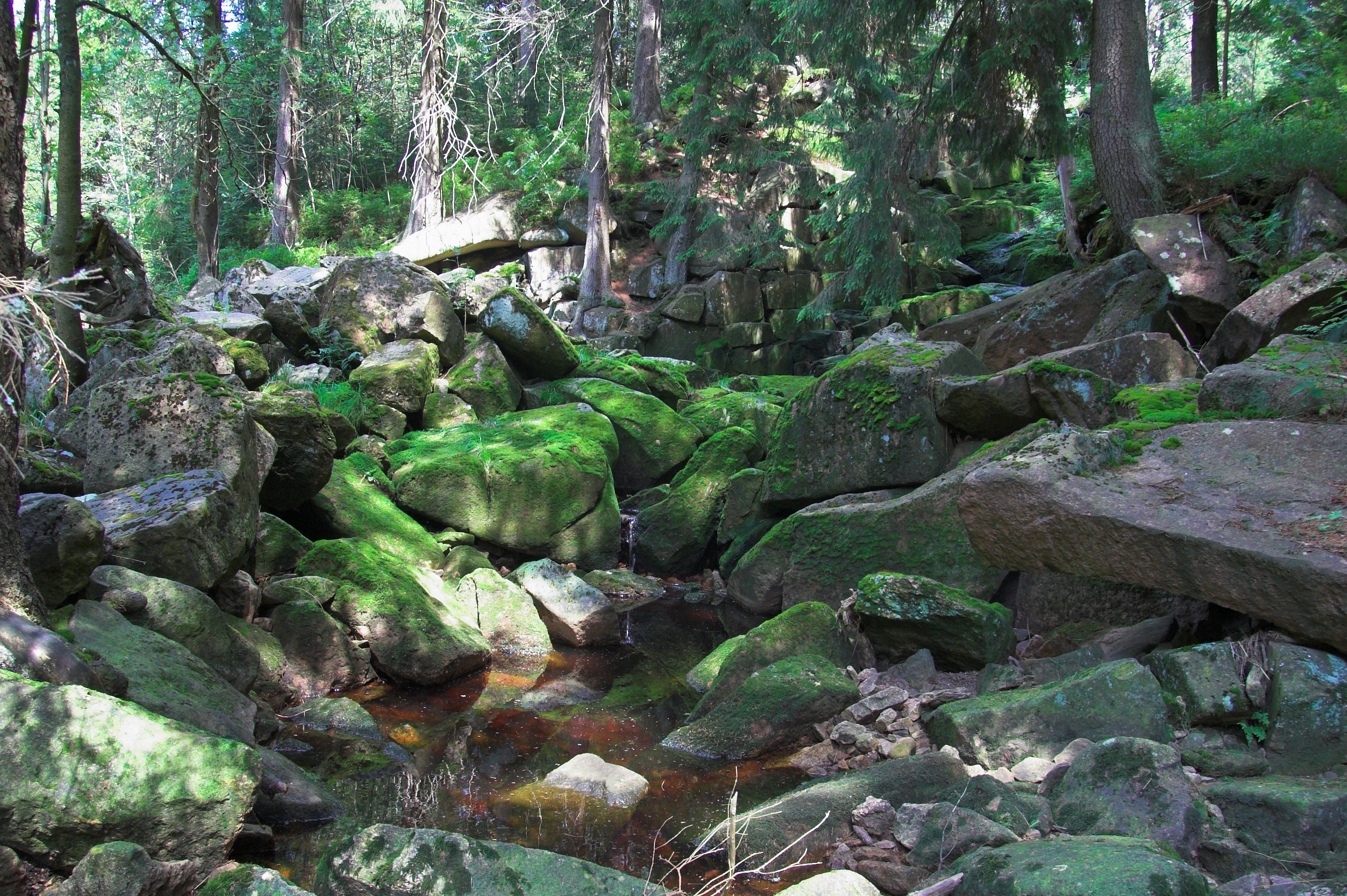
The lower section of the Großer Ausflut

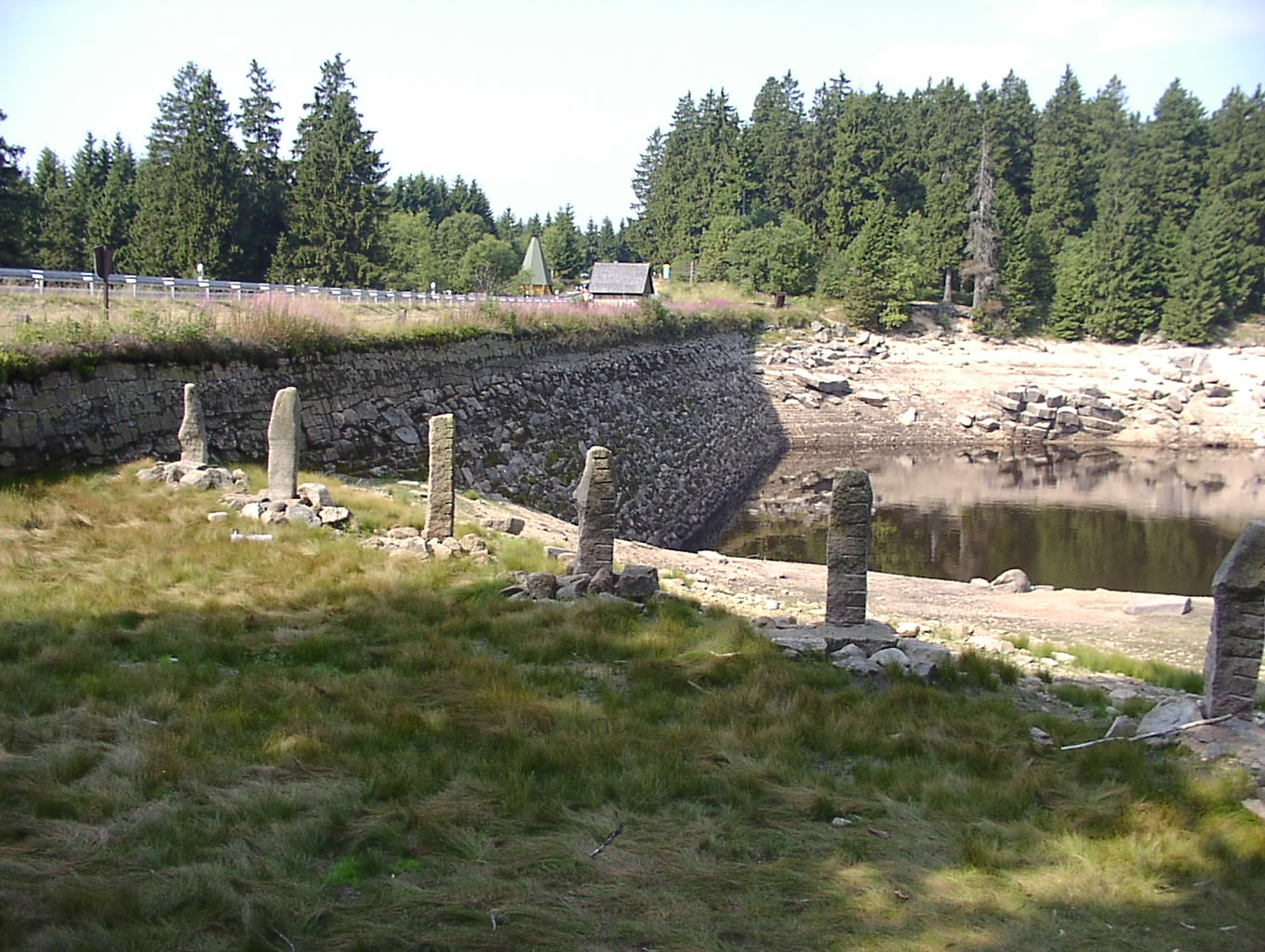
Granite posts in front of the outlet. Behind: the upstream side of the cyclopean stone wall at low water

Every reservoir needs a spillway which ensures that even under conditions of exceptionally high water, the water does not rise to an uncontrollably high level, possibly even pouring over the dam crest. On the Oderteich the spillway is located at the left hand (eastern) end of the dam.

In the reservoir in front of the outlet are several stone columns, like standing stones in appearance, about 2.50 metres high and made of granite. They serve to keep ice floes away from the spillway, because these could jam the channel. The old outlet is clearly identifiable by a weir, which was built in 1895 by the Royal Central Smithy in Clausthal Königlichen Centralschmiede Clausthal. This weir enables the maximum storage level to be raised by a metre or so.

Originally the spillway ran for almost a 100 metres in a straight line southwards before the water dropped into the valley. This course is still visible in the terrain to the experienced eye. But when towards the end of the construction phase in there were still not enough stones to complete the dam wall, a steep, 80-metre-long Große Ausflut ("large spillway") was blasted out of the rock roughly 60 metres below the weir at right angles to the original spillway. Perhaps it was hoped that this would increase the hydraulic capacity of the outlet. The channel carved out of the rock is very impressive especially on the spillway.

To begin with the spillway was not large enough: in December 1760 water overspilled the dam during a period of exceptional high water. Damage was limited, which said something, especially about the stable design of the dam. In response to this incident the dam was raised by about a metre, which has probably merely compensated for the subsidence of the dam since that time.

In 1886/87, however it appears that the conclusion was reached that the capacity of the spillway needed to be increased. To achieve this another spillway was built a few metres east of the existing one. It had an inlet breadth of 12 metres and its crest was about a metre higher than that of the old, main spillway. This outlet crosses under the B 242 parallel to the main one and merges with the main spillway shortly before the high-water marker and its adjoining chute (Schussrinne). This additional spillway enables the discharge capacity during times of flood to be increased by about 50%.

=== Coffer dam in the reservoir ===
When the Oderteich is fully emptied the remains of coffer dam can be seen about 200 metres above the main dam. This was built in 1898 when the Oderteich Reservoir was empty in order to reduce the water flow whilst repairs were carried out to the bottom outlet. The coffer dam must have been demolished immediately after this repair had been completed.

== Operation ==
=== Capacity ===
As a result of the use of water for electricity generation the Rehberg Ditch drew 200 to 300 litres of water per second continuously from the Oderteich. When the inflow of water is less than its outflow, the water level in the reservoir drops. If there are several months of drought in succession, the reservoir can become empty. This happens about every five to ten years, the last occasions being in 1991, 1999 and 2003.

The surcharge capacity of the Oderteich is very small. Its reservoir can only store 14% of its annual discharge. This results in unusually high fluctuations in the water level of the reservoir, which can even change from being largely empty to overflowing within a few hours. This explains why the Oderteich overflows several times a year.

=== Water quality ===
There is no fishway at the Oderteich. The relatively acidic condition of the water is probably not a good habitat for fish. Most of the water comes from areas of raised bog and is rich in humic acid. Humic acid also causes its brown coloration. In addition, it reduces surface tension, something which causes conspicuous white horses such as occur in the turbulence at the intakes and outlets of the reservoir.

== Largest dam in Germany ==
The Oderteich is frequently reported as the "oldest dam and reservoir in Germany". This accolade is disputed, however, because in the early 18th century in the area of Clausthal-Zellerfeld, Buntenbock and Hahnenklee there was already a large number of 'reservoirs' (Talsperren) as defined by the German industrial norm, DIN 19700-11. What is true is that from its completion in 1722 to the end of the 19th century, a period of 170 years, it had the largest dam in Germany. Not until the Eschbach Dam in the Bergisches Land was finished in 1891 with a height of 23 m was there a higher dam than the Oderteich.

== Recreation ==
=== Waterside footpath ===
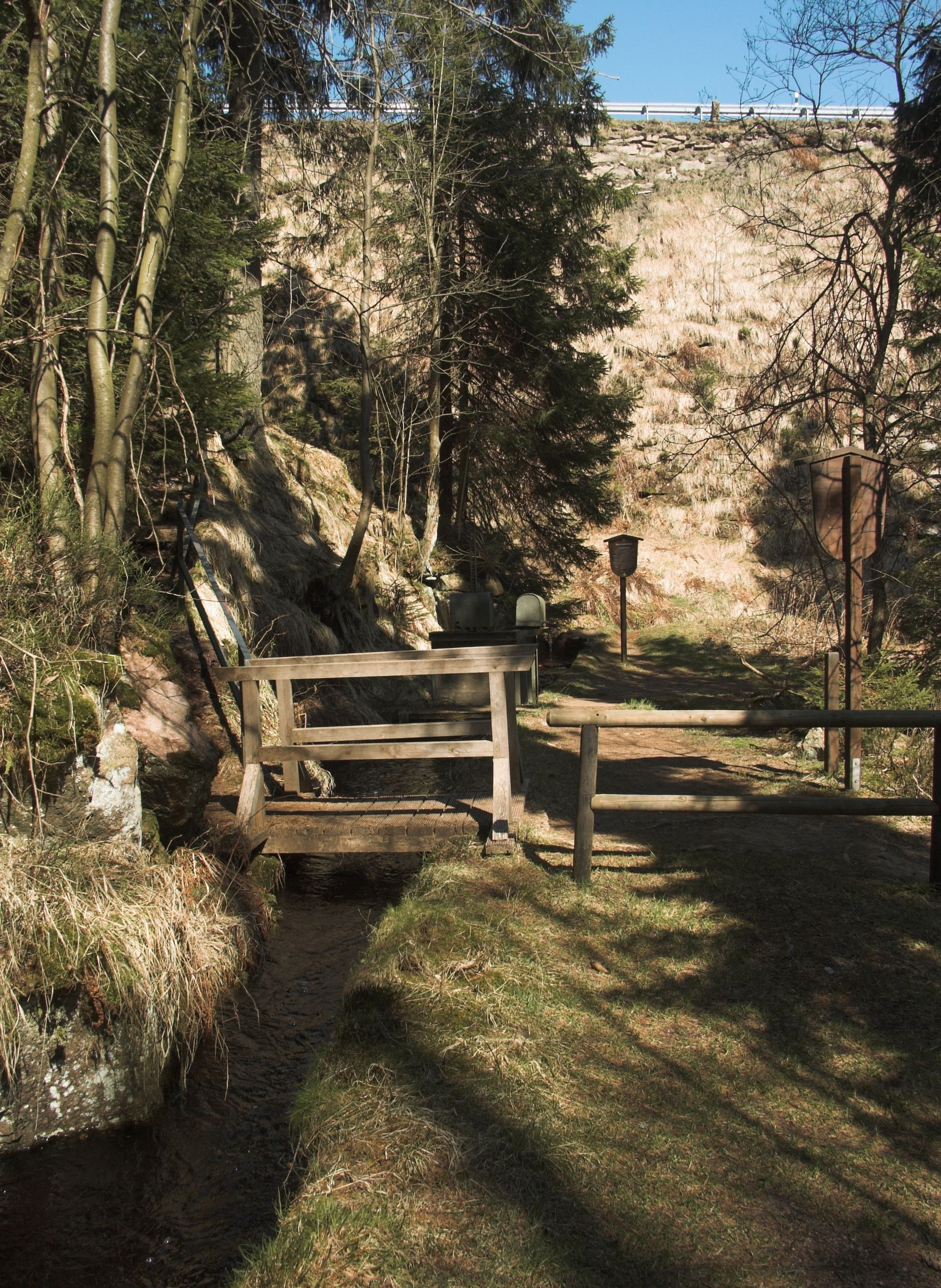
Start of the Rehberg Ditch from the bottom outlet of the Oderteich. In the background is the downstream side of the dam

In the middle of the 1990s, the operators of the Oderteich, the Harzwasserwerke, laid out a waterside footpath (the WasserWanderWeg) as an educational trail. This runs along the dam crest to the two spillways, past the two additional basins and via the overspill marker then downhill alongside the Großer Ausflut and its chute to the downstream foot of the dam, from where there is an impressive view of the stonework on this side of the dam and where the bottom outlet and start of the Rehberg Ditch can be seen. Information boards along the path explain the various structures.

=== Other recreational uses ===
The Oderteich lies in the centre of the Harz National Park. Swimming is allowed in the southern third of the reservoir and in the vicinity of the dam. The northern area is barred to swimmers in the summer by a chain and is meant to be exclusively reserved as a biotope. There is a roughly 4.5 km long circular walk around the reservoir, for which good walking boots are recommended. This path is routed along board walks in places because of the terrain which resembles that of a raised bog.

Winter sports, such as skating, on the reservoir in winter are not recommended, because the large variations in the water level make the formation of a stable ice surface difficult, especially near the shores.

=== Dam keeper's building ===
Until the 1960s there was a dam keeper's house at the western end of the dam, which was used latterly as a restaurant. It was demolished when it was deemed unnecessary to have a dam keeper permanently presence on the site. The foundations of the old building can be made out behind the present day National Park bus shelter. In addition there is the former MTV Goslar ski lodge, built at the end of the 1940s and now partly hidden and which can also be booked today as accommodation for self-catering groups.

== See also ==
- List of dams in the Harz
- List of lakes in Germany
- List of reservoirs and dams in Germany

== Sources ==
- Franke, Peter; Frey, Wolfgang (1987), Talsperren im Bundesrepublik Deutschland (in German), Berlin: Systemdruck, ISBN 3-926520-00-0
- Liebermann, Markus; Ließmann, Wilfried; Rutsch, Andreas (2003), "300 Jahre Neuer Rehberg Ditch", Beiträge zur Bergbaugeschichte von Sankt Andreasberg (in German), no. 3, Sankt Andreasberg: Selbstverlag
- Schmidt, Martin (2002), "Die Wasserwirtschaft des Oberharzer Bergbaus", Schriftenreihe der Frontinus-Gesellschaft (in German), no. 13, Hildesheim: Selbstverlag Harzwasserwerke GmbH
- Schmidt, Martin (2005), Das Kulturdenkmal Oberharzer Wasserregal (PDF) (in German), Clausthal-Zellerfeld: Harzwasserwerke, archived from the original (PDF) on 19 April 2009
