= Oder (Harz) =

River in Germany

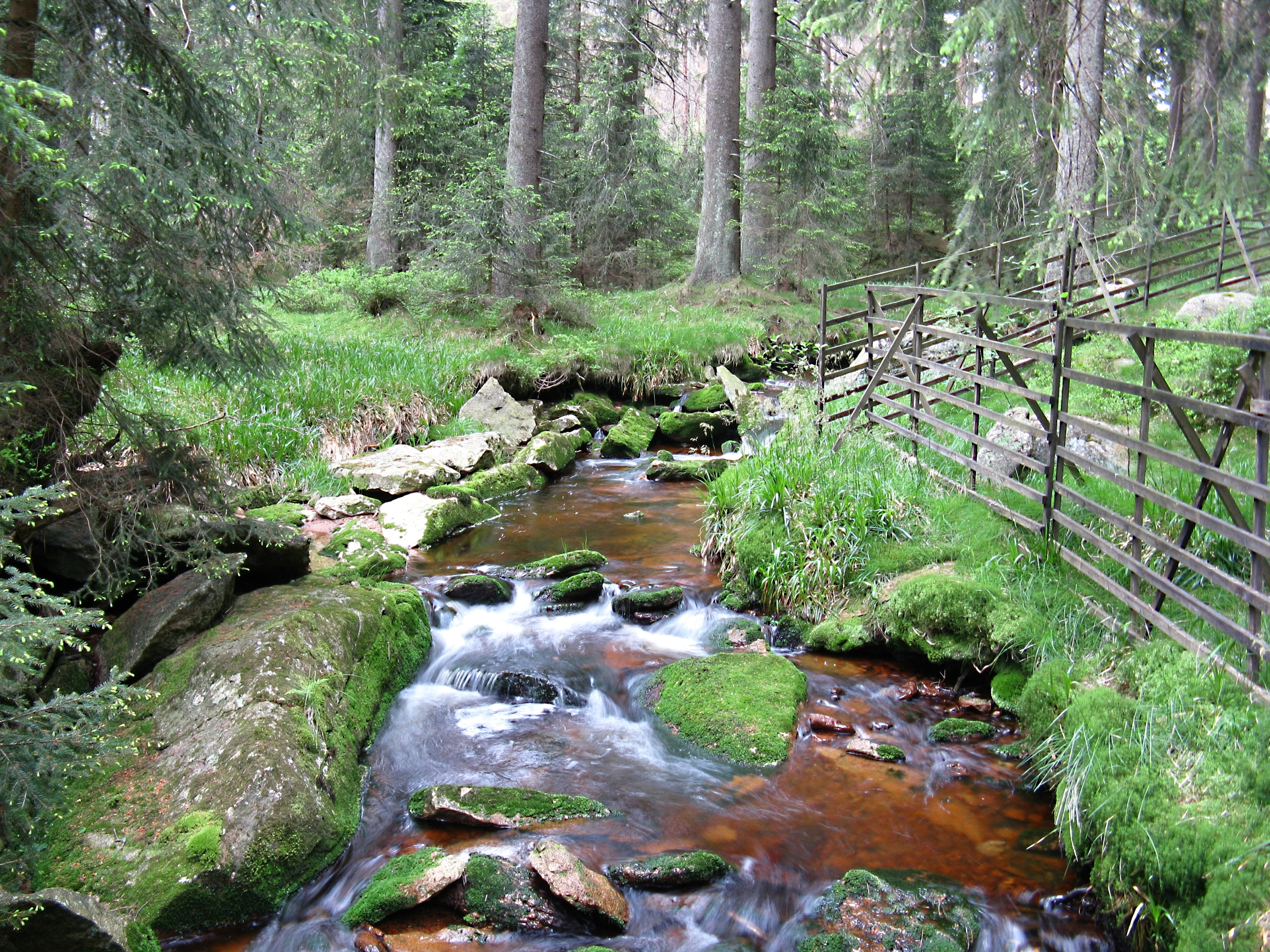

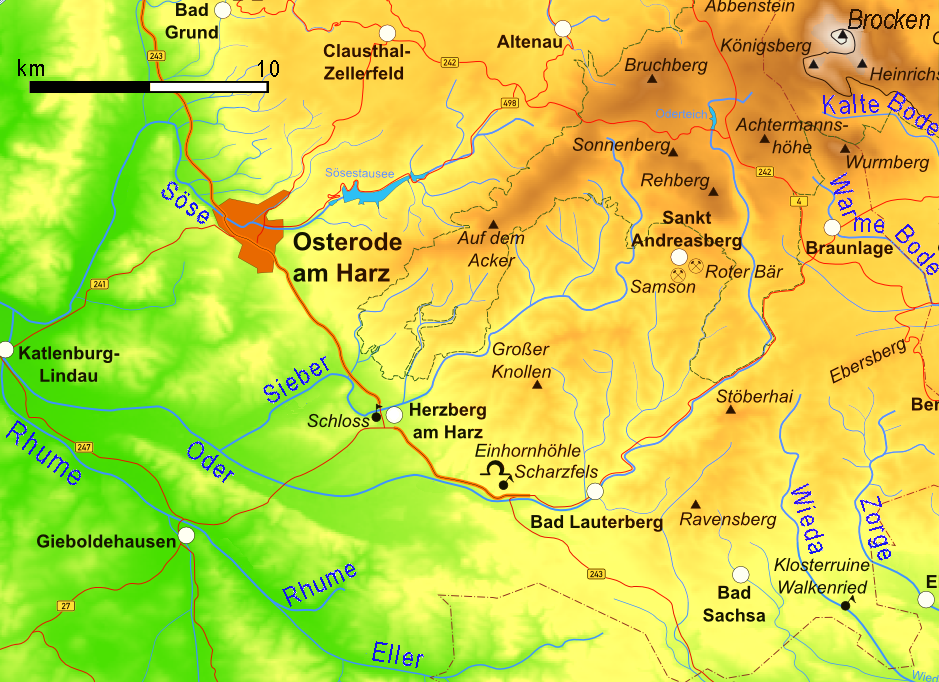
- Southwest Harz with the Oder

Location
- Country: Germany
- State: East Lower Saxony

Physical characteristics
- Source
  - location: near Oderbrück (part of Sankt Andreasberg) in the Harz Mountains
  - elevation: ca. 810 m above sea level (NN)
- Mouth
  - location: near Katlenburg into the Rhume
  - coordinates: 51°40′44″N 10°6′11.05″E
  - elevation: 131 m above sea level (NN)
- Length: 56.1 km (34.9 mi)
- Basin size: 385 km^{2} (149 sq mi)

Basin features
- Progression: Rhume→ Leine→ Aller→ Weser→ North Sea
- Landmarks: Small towns: Bad Lauterberg
- Tributaries
  - left: Pöhlder Beber
  - right: Sperrlutter, Lutter, Sieber
- Waterbodies: Reservoirs: Oderteich, Oder Reservoir

The Oder (German pronunciation: [ˈoːdɐ]) is a 56-kilometre-long (35 mi) river in Lower Saxony, Germany, and a right tributary of the Rhume. Its source is in the Harz mountains, near Sankt Andreasberg. It flows southwest through Bad Lauterberg, Pöhlde and Hattorf am Harz. The Oder flows into the Rhume in Katlenburg-Lindau.

== Course ==
The Oder rises in the district of Goslar in the heart of the Harz Mountains. Its source is located in the southern part of the Brockenfeld about 1.3 km (0.81 mi) north of the Achtermannshöhe. The river's source is called the Odersprung or "Oder Leap."

On the Brockenfeld, which is close to the Odersprung, the rivers Abbe, Große Bode, Ecker and Kalte Bode also have their respective origins. On its perimeter is the ancient Dreieckiger Pfahl boundary stone.

After the Oder passed under the B 4 federal highway in Oderbrück in east-west direction, it is impounded for the first time west of the village in the Oderteich, where it bends to the south. A few kilometres further downstream, the river is impounded for the second time not far southwest of Oder Valley Sawmill (Odertaler Sägemühle) by the barrage of the Oder Dam. Thereafter the river flows through Bad Lauterberg and leaves the Harz.

In Bad Lauterberg the Oder swings west, running through Pöhlde and Hattorf am Harz, passing north of the Rotenberg ridge, and reaches Wulften. In Hattorf it collects the Sieber river coming from the northeast, before emptying into the Rhume (a tributary of the Leine) in Katlenburg from the east.

Between Scharzfeld and Katlenburg the Oder flows through the nature reserve of Oderaue.

== Villages where the river flows ==
- Oderbrück (district of Sankt Andreasberg)
- Oderhaus (district of Sankt Andreasberg)
- Bad Lauterberg
- Scharzfeld
- Pöhlde
- Hattorf am Harz
- Wulften am Harz
- Katlenburg-Lindau

== Tributaries ==
- Sperrlutter
- Lutter
- Sieber

== Pictures ==
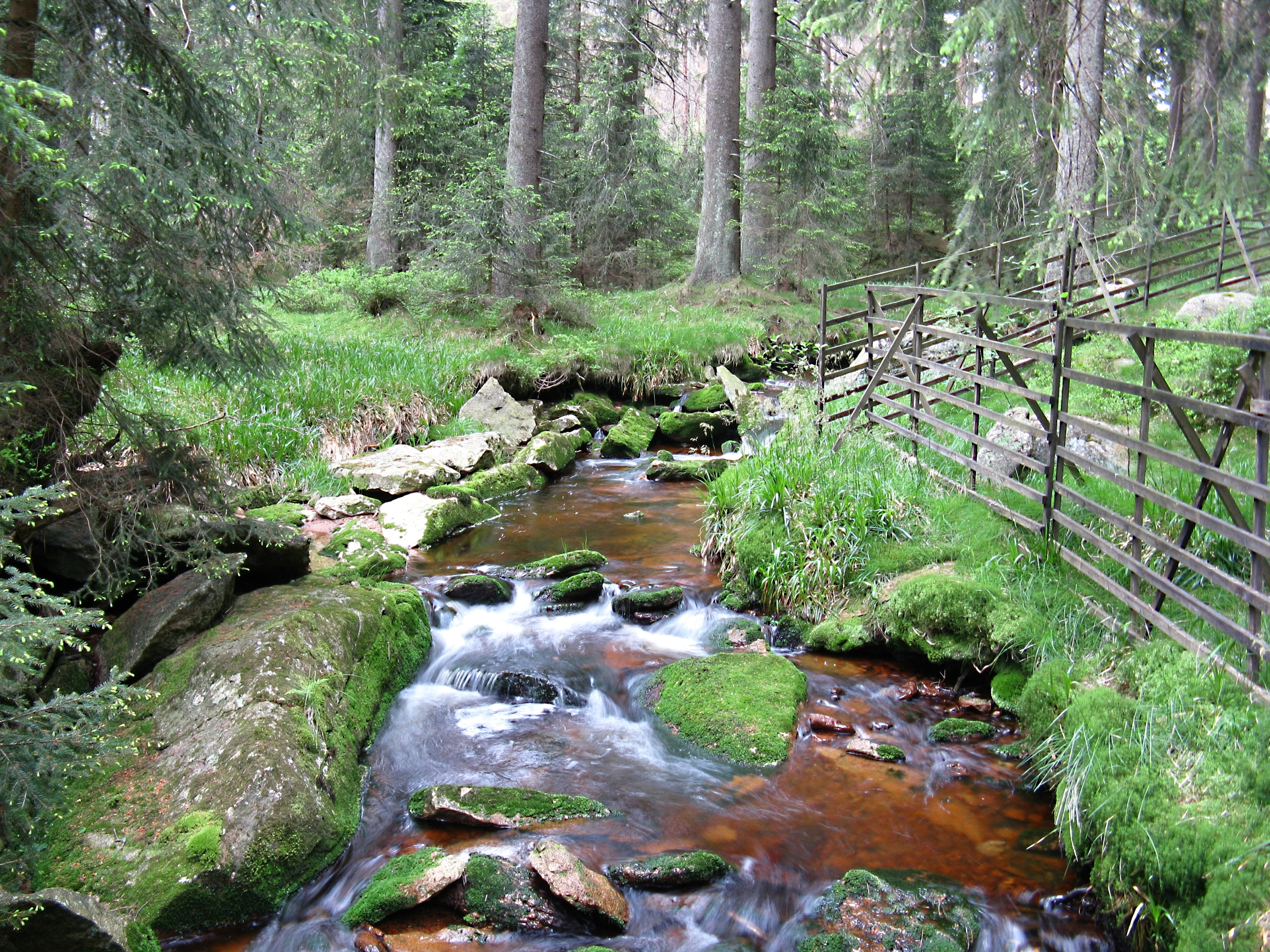
The Oder above the Oderteich

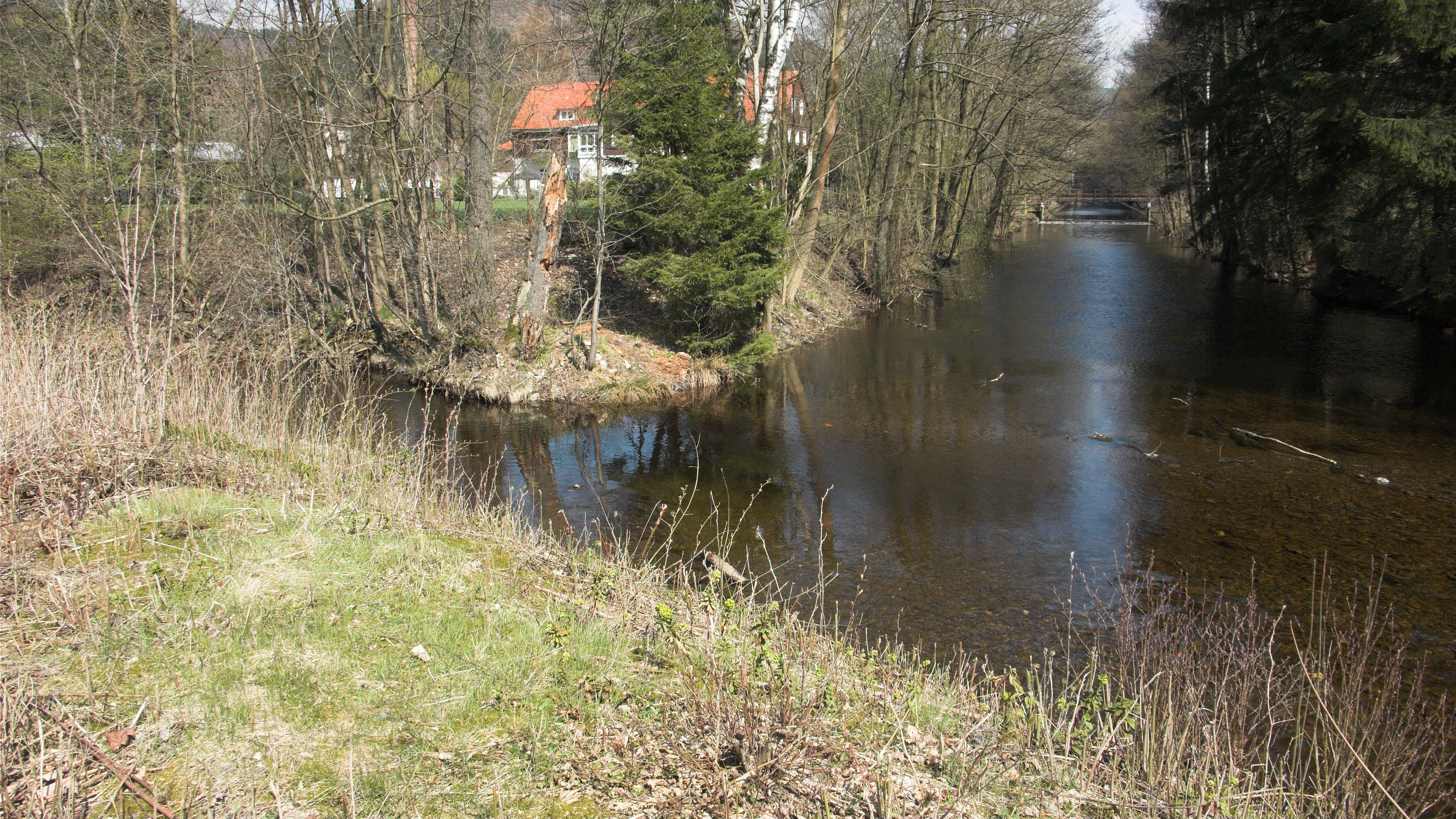
Confluence of the Sperrlutter

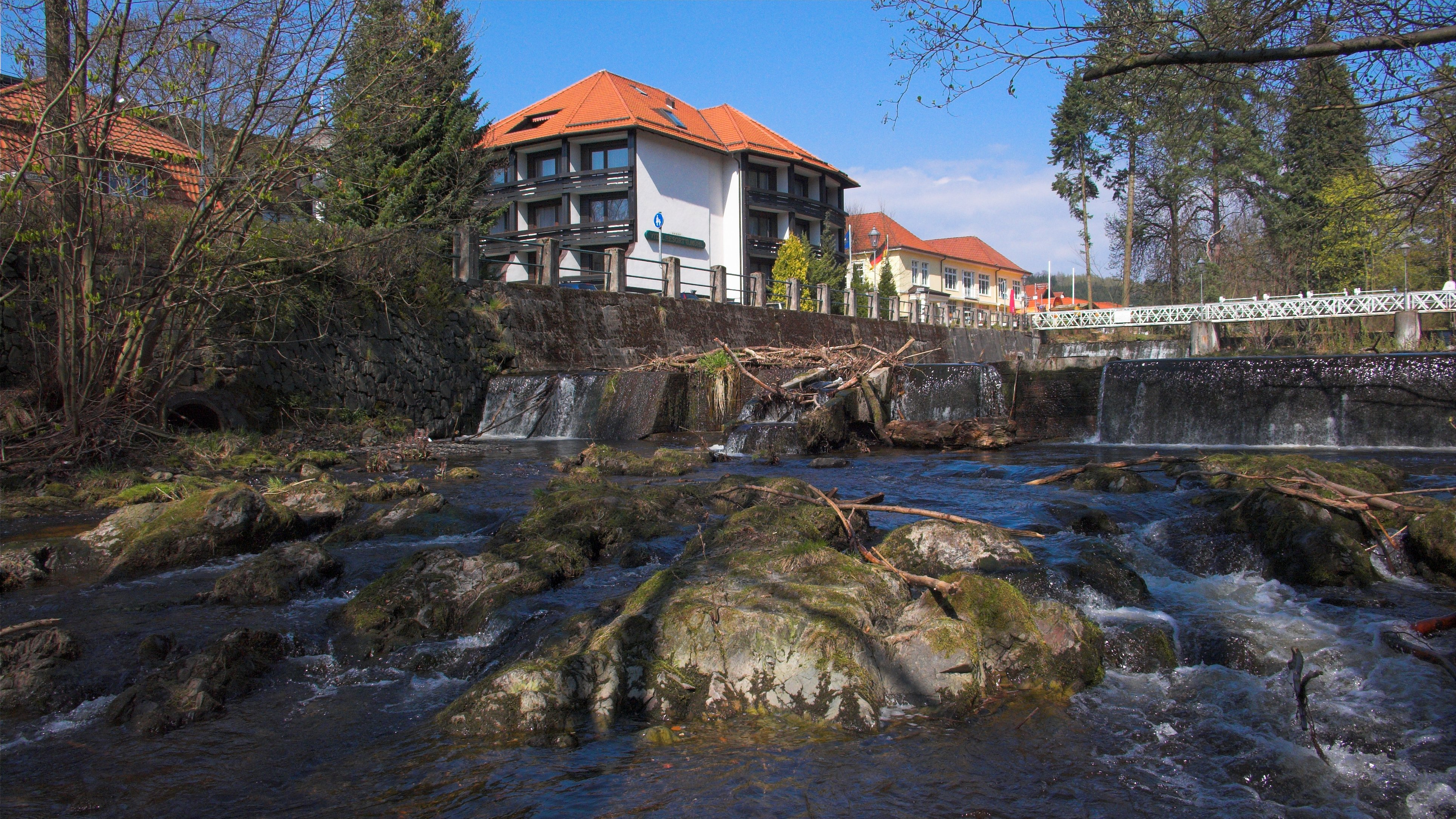
The Oder in Bad Lauterberg

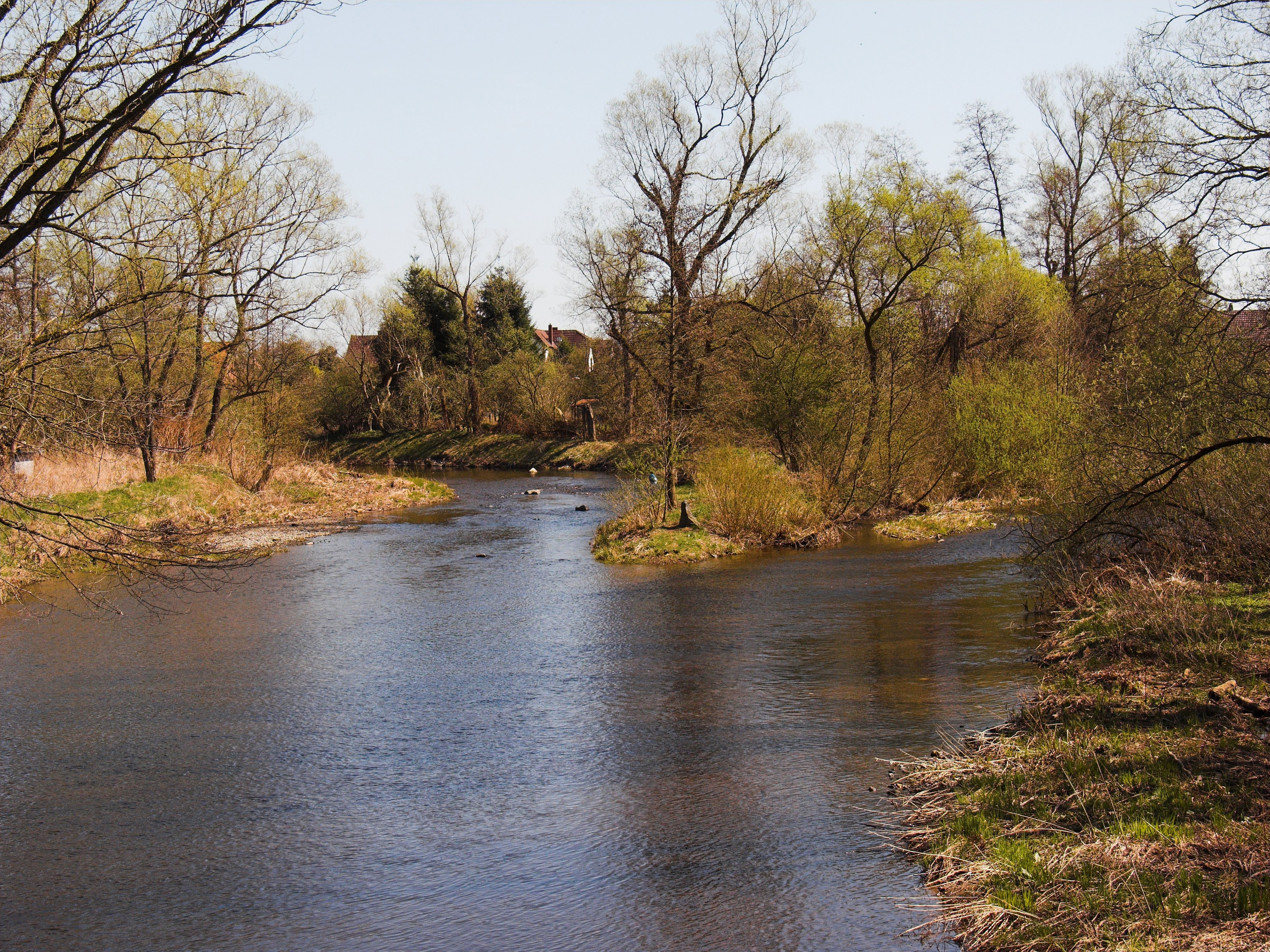
Confluence of Sieber (left) in the Oder (right) at Hattorf

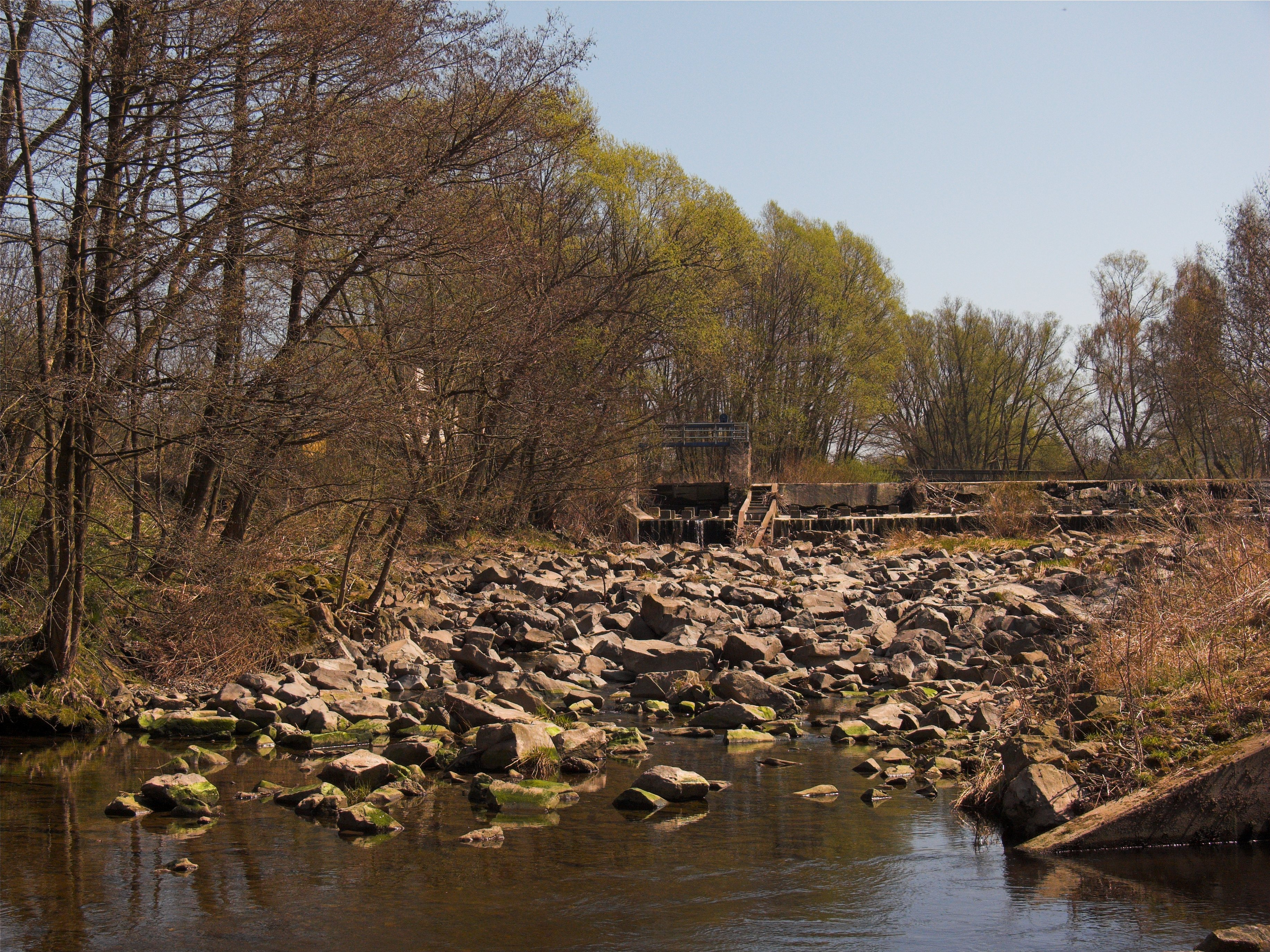
Oder-Wehr near Hattorf

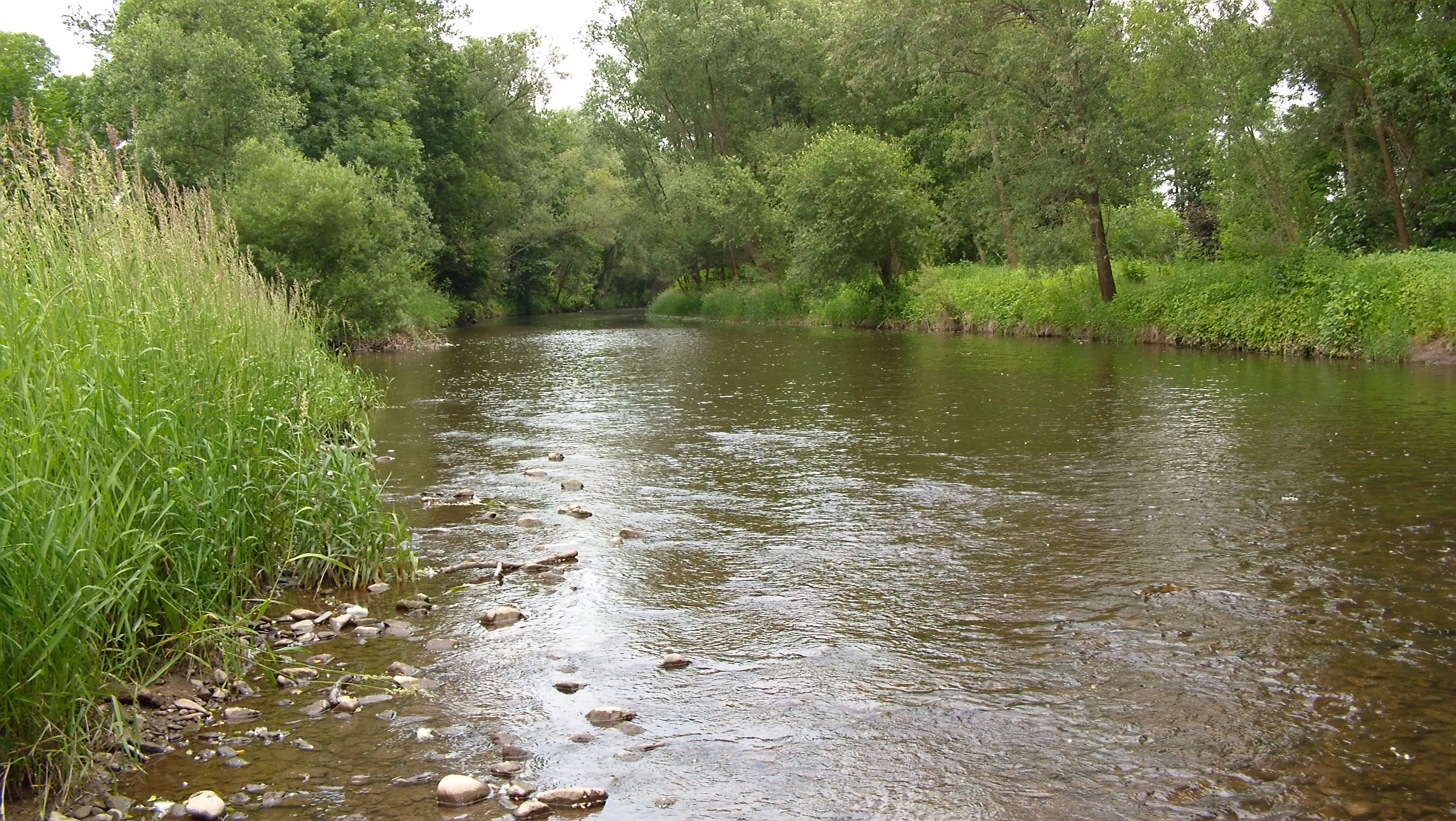
The Oder in Wulften

== See also ==
- List of rivers of Lower Saxony
