= Bad Lauterberg =

Place in Lower Saxony, Germany

Bad Lauterberg im Harz
- Town
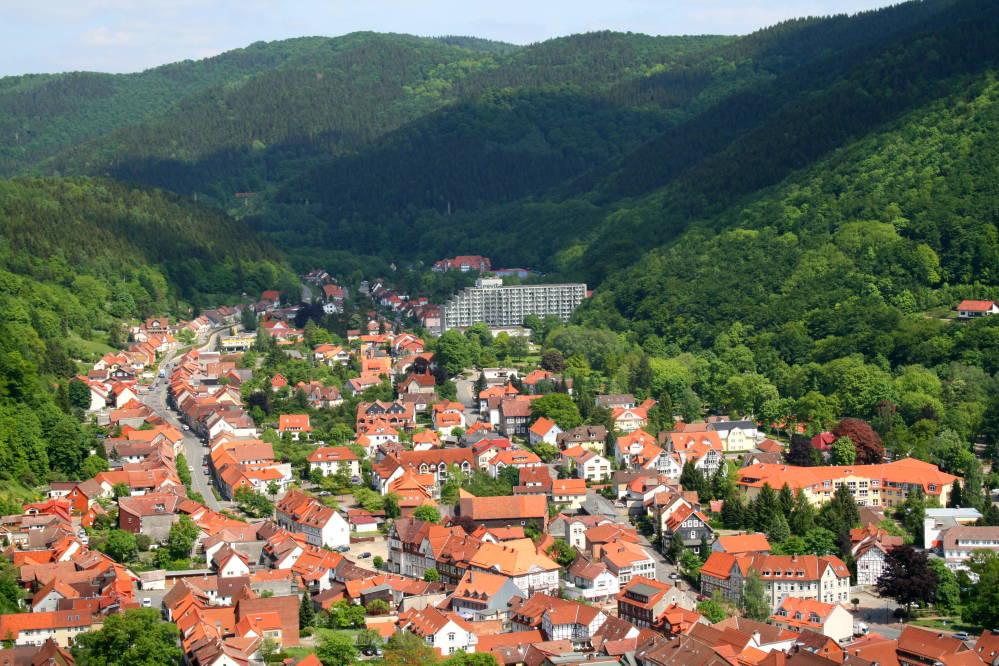
- General view of the town

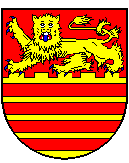
- Coat of arms

- Location of Bad Lauterberg im Harz within Göttingen district
- Interactive map of Bad Lauterberg im Harz
- Location within Germany Location within Lower Saxony
- Coordinates: 51°37′54″N 10°28′14″E
- Country: Germany
- State: Lower Saxony
- District: Göttingen
- Subdivisions: 4 districts

Government
  - Mayor (2021–26): Rolf Lange (CDU)

Area
  - Total: 41.56 km^{2} (16.05 sq mi)
- Elevation: 296 m (971 ft)

Population (2025-12-31)
  - Total: 10,097
  - Density: 242.9/km^{2} (629.2/sq mi)
- Time zone: UTC+01:00 (CET)
  - Summer (DST): UTC+02:00 (CEST)
- Postal codes: 37431
- Dialling codes: 05524
- Vehicle registration: GÖ, OHA
- Website: www.badlauterberg.de

Bad Lauterberg im Harz (German pronunciation: [baːt ˈlaʊtɐbɛʁk ʔɪm ˈhaːɐ̯ts], lit. 'Bad Lauterberg in the Harz'), commonly known as Bad Lauterberg, is a town in the district of Göttingen, in Lower Saxony, Germany. It is situated in the southern Harz, approx. 15 km southwest of Braunlage, and 20 km southeast of Osterode am Harz.

Bad Lauterberg is known inter alia for the liqueurs, Schierker Feuerstein and Harzer Grubenlicht, which are both manufactured and bottled here.

Bad Lauterberg was the birthplace (1879) of the Polar explorer Alfred Ritscher.

== Politics ==
=== Town council ===
Town Council after the local elections on September 11, 2016:

- CDU: 6 seats
- Wählergruppe: 5 seats
- SPD: 5 seats
- BI: 2 seats
- Bündnis 90/Die Grünen: 1 seats
- NPD: 1 seat

== Sights ==
About a mile east of the town in the mountains is the viewing point of Hohe Tür which is by a mountain lake and on the main Weser-Elbe watershed. It is checkpoint 43 in the Harzer Wandernadel hiking network.

== Notable people ==
- Alfred Ritscher (1879-1963), captain and Arctic explorer
- Eberhard Umbach (born 1948), German physicist and science manager
- Bibiana Steinhaus (born 1979), football referee
- Tino Schmidt (born 1993), football player, played over 220 games

== See also ==
- Osterhagen
