= Siegelsum =

- Village of Upgant-Schott
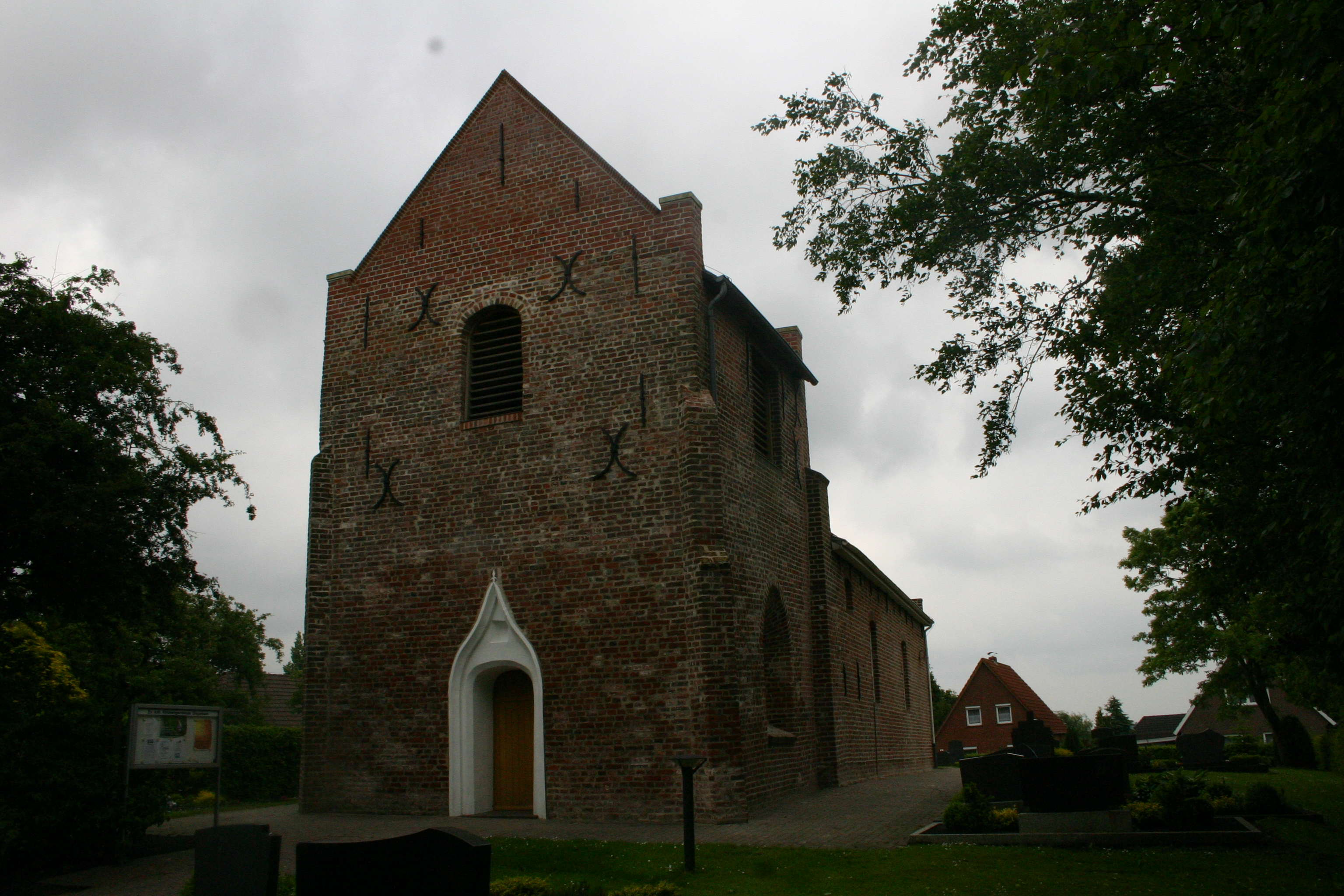
- Siegelsum Church

- Coat of arms
- Interactive map of Siegelsum
- Location within Germany Location within Lower Saxony
- Coordinates: 53.49771°N 7.28559°E
- Country: Germany
- State: Lower Saxony
- District: Aurich
- Municipality: Upgant-Schott

Population
  - Metro: 247
- Time zone: UTC+01:00 (CET)
  - Summer (DST): UTC+02:00 (CEST)
- Dialling codes: 04934
- Vehicle registration: 26529
- Website: www.siegelsum.de

Siegelsum is an East Frisian village in Lower Saxony, Germany. It is an Ortsteil of the municipality of Upgant-Schott, part of the municipal association (Samtgemeinde) of Brookmerland. It is located south of Upgant-Schott and Marienhafe.

== History ==
Siegelsum is mentioned in a document from 1450, a contract for the sale of land known as Sygildsum. In a contract from 1475, the priest Hero seals to Sigelsum and in an income register of the parishes in Friesland from the same year, Sigelum is also listed. In 1478, the place is called Sygheldsum in a purchase contract, and around 1500 it is called Sigelzum or Sergum in the income register. The two East Frisian maps by David Fabricius from 1589 and 1613 as well as the oldest map by Ubbo Emmius from 1595 already contain the place name Sigelsum. In a map made by engineer Johann von Honaert in 1674, the place is listed as Sygelsumb and the district administrator Cirk Heinrich Stürenburg calls it Siegelßum several times in his 1735 description of the Aurich district. The place name is often incorrectly associated with a sluice or with brickworks, which did indeed exist. The ending -um is derived from hem ("home") and is usually combined with a personal name. In this respect, the first part of the name of the old documented place names can indicate an early settler named Sygheld, Segheld, or similar and the ending can indicate his home or residence.

The small village of Siegelsum already had a church in the 13th century, which had to be demolished due to damage sustained in the Thirty Years' War. The current church was built in 1822.

Until 1 July 1972, Siegelsum was its own independent municipality, when it became incorporated into the municipality of Upgant-Schott.
