= Südcoldinne =

- Village of Großheide
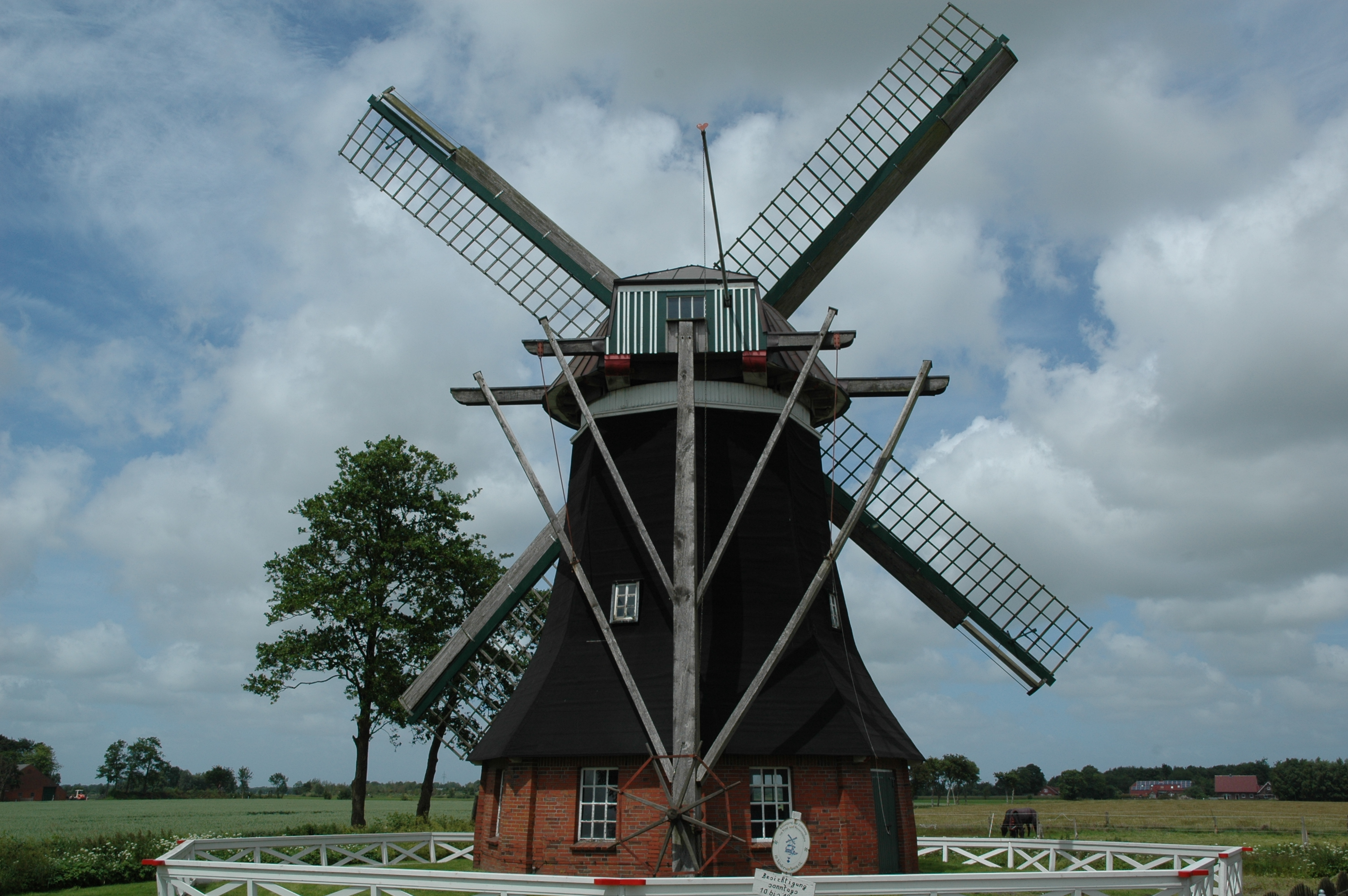
- Windmill in Südcoldinne
- Interactive map of Südcoldinne
- Location within Germany Location within Lower Saxony
- Coordinates: 53.56466°N 7.39015°E
- Country: Germany
- State: Lower Saxony
- District: Aurich
- Municipality: Großheide

Population
  - Metro: 378
- Time zone: UTC+01:00 (CET)
  - Summer (DST): UTC+02:00 (CEST)
- Vehicle registration: 26532

Südcoldinne is an East Frisian village in Lower Saxony, Germany. It is an Ortsteil of the municipality of Großheide, in the Aurich district.

The village has belonged to Großheide since the regional and administrative reform of 1 July 1972. Before that, it belonged to the municipality of Menstede-Coldinne, which was incorporated into Großheide.

The settlement of Südcoldinne began around 1800 on a pasture area south of today's Coldinner Straße. The village was first referred to as Süder-Coldinne in 1871.
