= Westerende =

- Village of Großheide
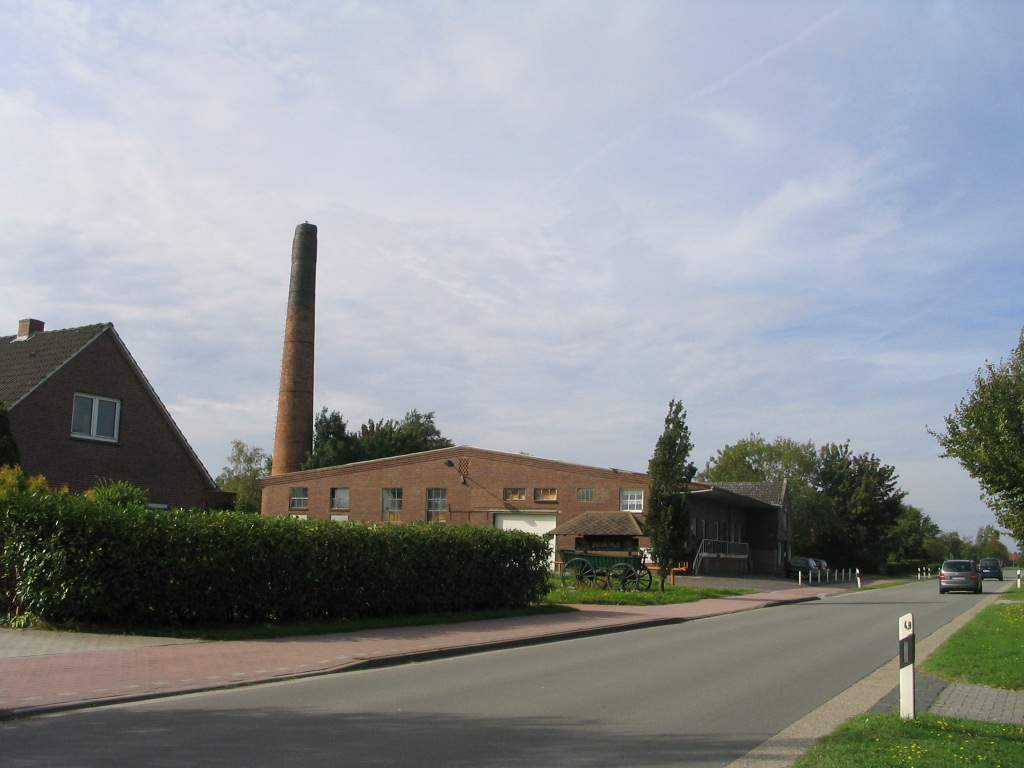
- Former dairy in Westerende

- Coat of arms
- Interactive map of Westerende
- Location within Germany Location within Lower Saxony
- Coordinates: 53.61082°N 7.35542°E
- Country: Germany
- State: Lower Saxony
- District: Aurich
- Municipality: Großheide

Area
  - Metro: 6.9 km^{2} (2.7 sq mi)
- Elevation: 4.5 m (15 ft)

Population
  - Metro: 570
- Time zone: UTC+01:00 (CET)
  - Summer (DST): UTC+02:00 (CEST)
- Dialling codes: 04936
- Vehicle registration: 26532

Westerende is an East Frisian village in Lower Saxony, Germany. It is an Ortsteil of the municipality of Großheide, in the Aurich district. The dispersed settlement is located about ten kilometers east of the city of Norden. Westerende was an independent municipality until 1 July 1972, when it merged with four other surrounding municipalities to form the new municipality of Großheide.

== Etymology ==
The village's name refers to its location west of Arle. The settlement was first mentioned in 1420 as Westerenstede. The current spelling has been in use since 1491. The district is divided into Terhalle, Schleen, and Westerende, of which Terhalle is the oldest. Other villages and residential areas in Westerende are Osterbrande (mentioned in 1645 as Brande), Kantjeburg (mentioned in 1812 as Kaantjeborg and in 1852 as Kraanteburg), Westerbrande (mentioned in 1719), Westerender Hammrich (mentioned in 1871) and Wirde (first recorded in 1843).
