= Arle =

Arle may refer to:

== Places ==
- Arle, Cheltenham, a district of Gloucestershire, England
- Arle Grove, a nature reserve in Gloucestershire, England
- River Arle, alternative name for the River Alre, Hampshire, England
- Arle, Occitan-language name for Arles, France
- Arle, Großheide, a district of Großheide, Frisia, Lower Saxony, Germany

== Other ==
- Arle Nadja, a character from the Madō Monogatari and Puyo Puyo video game franchises
- Coretti Arle-Titz, American-born Soviet jazz singer
