= Südarle =

- Village of Großheide
- Interactive map of Südarle
- Location within Germany Location within Lower Saxony
- Coordinates: 53.57117°N 7.40734°E
- Country: Germany
- State: Lower Saxony
- District: Aurich
- Municipality: Großheide

Population
  - Metro: 463
- Time zone: UTC+01:00 (CET)
  - Summer (DST): UTC+02:00 (CEST)
- Vehicle registration: 26532

Südarle is an East Frisian village in Lower Saxony, Germany. It is an Ortsteil of the municipality of Großheide, in the Aurich district. The village is located about 3.5 kilometers from the center of the municipality.

The village has belonged to the municipality of Großheide since the Lower Saxony municipal reform of 1 July 1972. Before that, it belonged to the municipality of Arle, which was incorporated into Großheide as part of the reform.

Settlement in Südarle began in 1797 on the Dornumer Moorweg. In 1848, 252 people lived in the peat colony, distributed across 48 houses.
