= Dornumersiel =

- Village of Dornum
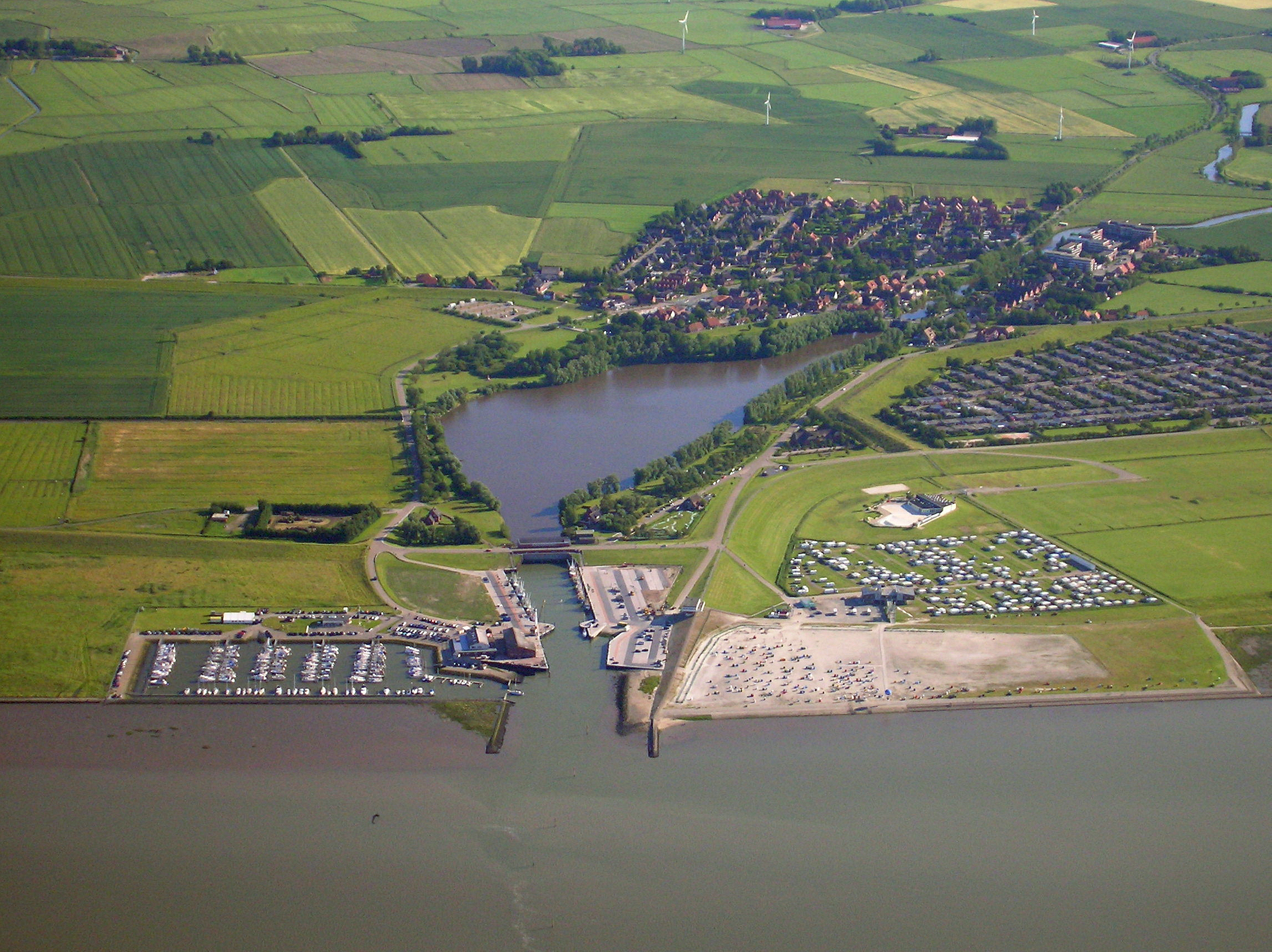
- Aerial view of Dornumersiel

- Coat of arms
- Interactive map of Dornumersiel
- Location within Germany Location within Lower Saxony
- Coordinates: 53.67345°N 7.47122°E
- Country: Germany
- State: Lower Saxony
- District: Aurich
- Municipality: Dornum

Area
  - Metro: 1 km^{2} (0.39 sq mi)
- Elevation: 1 m (3.3 ft)

Population
  - Metro: 429
- Time zone: UTC+01:00 (CET)
  - Summer (DST): UTC+02:00 (CEST)
- Dialling codes: 04933
- Vehicle registration: 26553

Dornumersiel is an East Frisian village and coastal resort on the Wadden Sea coast in Lower Saxony, Germany. It is an Ortsteil of the municipality of Dornum, in the Aurich district. The village is converged with the village core of Westeraccumersiel. The two settlements are only divided by Dornumersieler Tief, the historical border of Norderland and Harlingerland. Dornumersiel has been part of the municipality of Dornum since 2001.

== Geography ==
Dornumersiel is located directly on the Wadden Sea coast south of the island of Langeoog. The main town of the municipality, Dornum, is about five kilometers away in a southwesterly direction. The nearest larger towns are Esens, twelve kilometers to the east, and Westerholt, seven kilometers to the south.

== History ==
The sluice (Siel) village is one of the oldest harbors on the East Frisian coast. The settlement of the place probably began in the 15th century. After the St. Peter's flood on 22 February 1651 destroyed another sluice village on the coast, later known as Altensiel, the Dornumer and Westeraccumer Siel were built right next to each other in 1653. This was once the border between East Frisia and Harlingerland. The two villages of Dornumersiel and Westeraccumersiel only came into being after the polders were dyked. The first documented mention of the village dates back to 1684. In 1717 they were almost completely destroyed by the Christmas flood. Today, Dornumersiel is a coastal seaside resort.

On 1 July 1972, the municipalities of Dornumergrode, Westeraccumersiel, and Westerbur were incorporated into the municipality of Dornumersiel. From 2 August 1972 to 31 October 2001, it was part of the municipal association (Samtgemeinde) of Dornum. Eventually, on 1 November 2001, Dornumersiel became part of the municipality of Dornum.

== Gallery ==
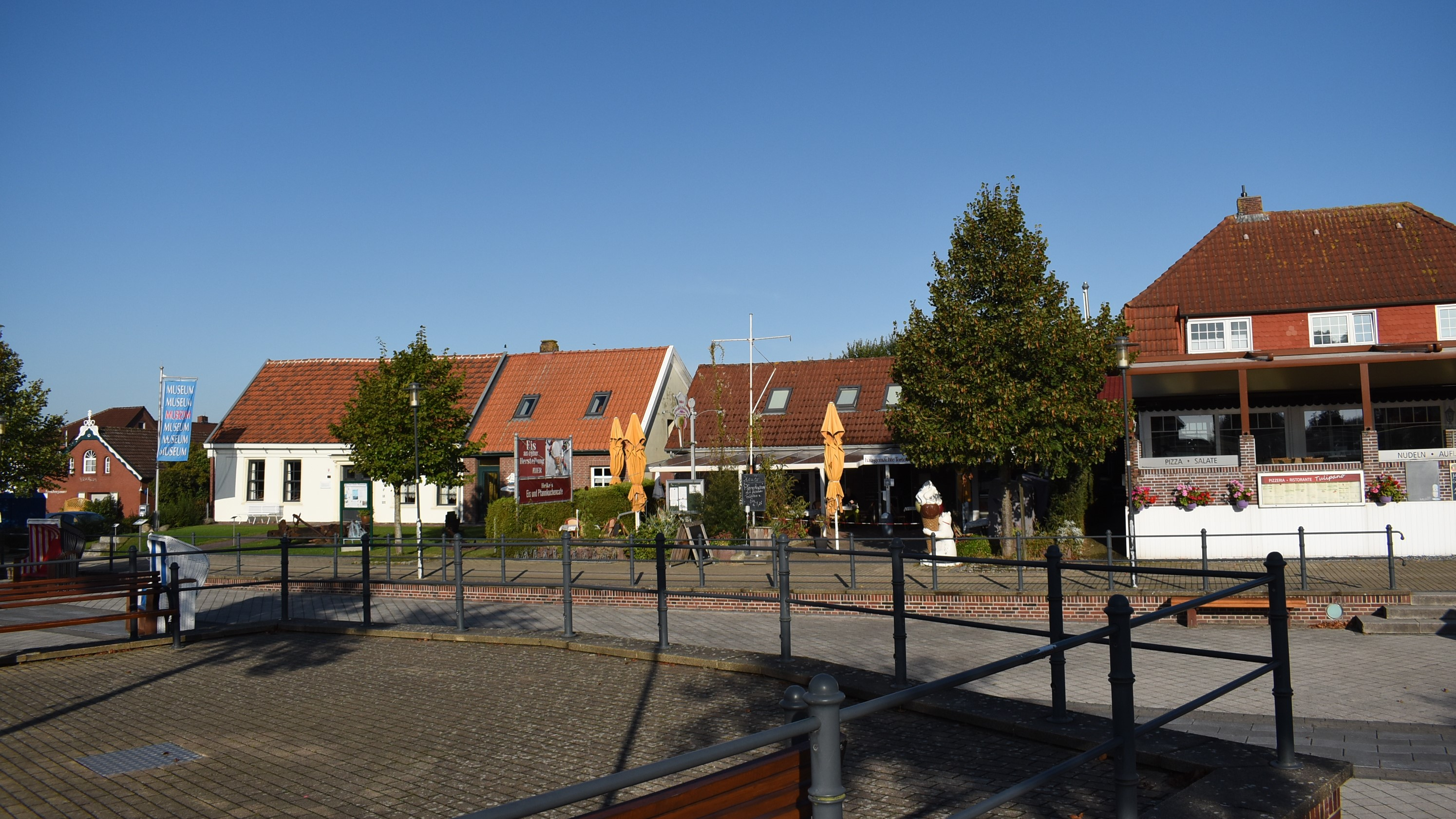
Street view of Dornumersiel

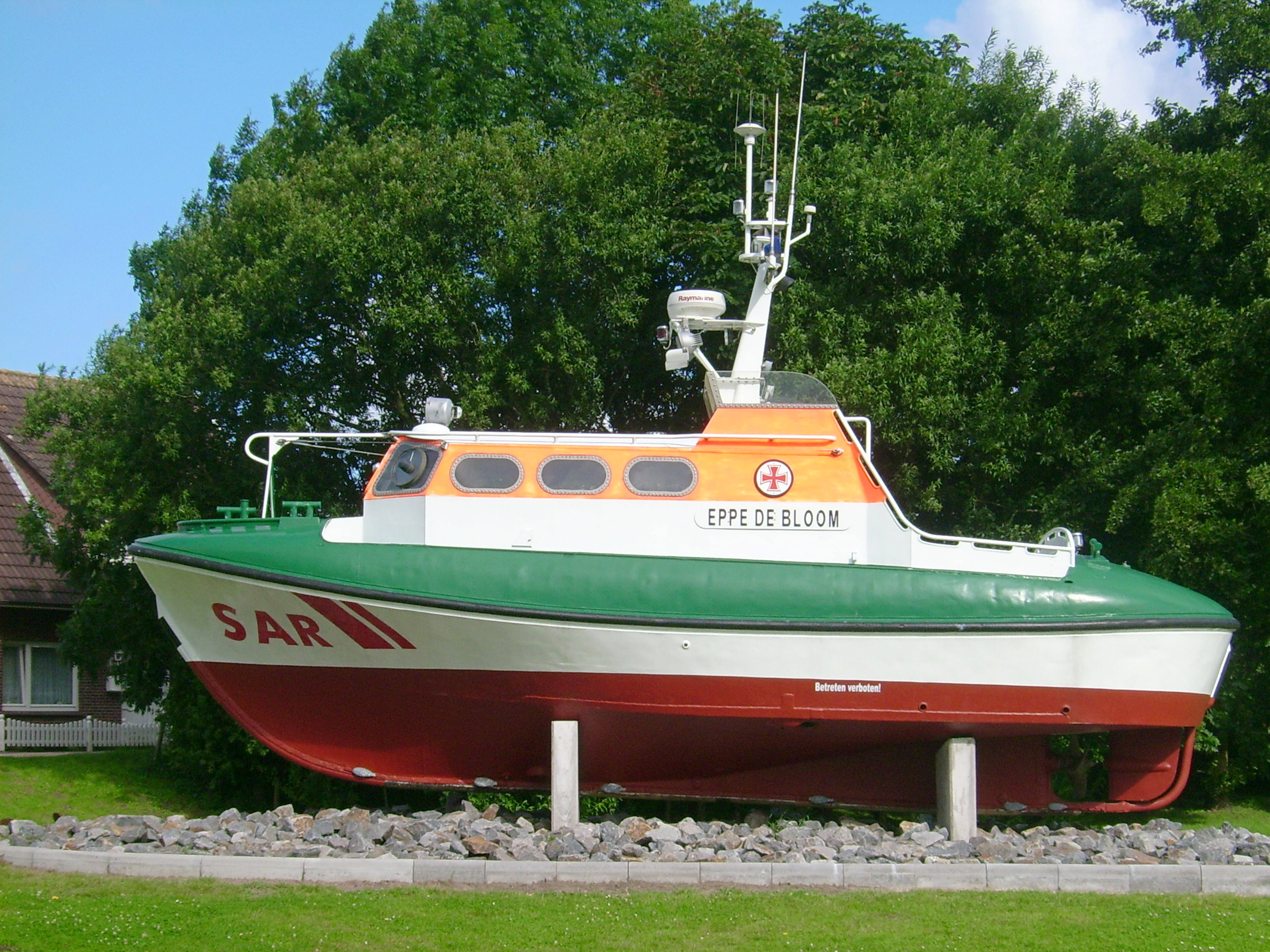
Lifeboat

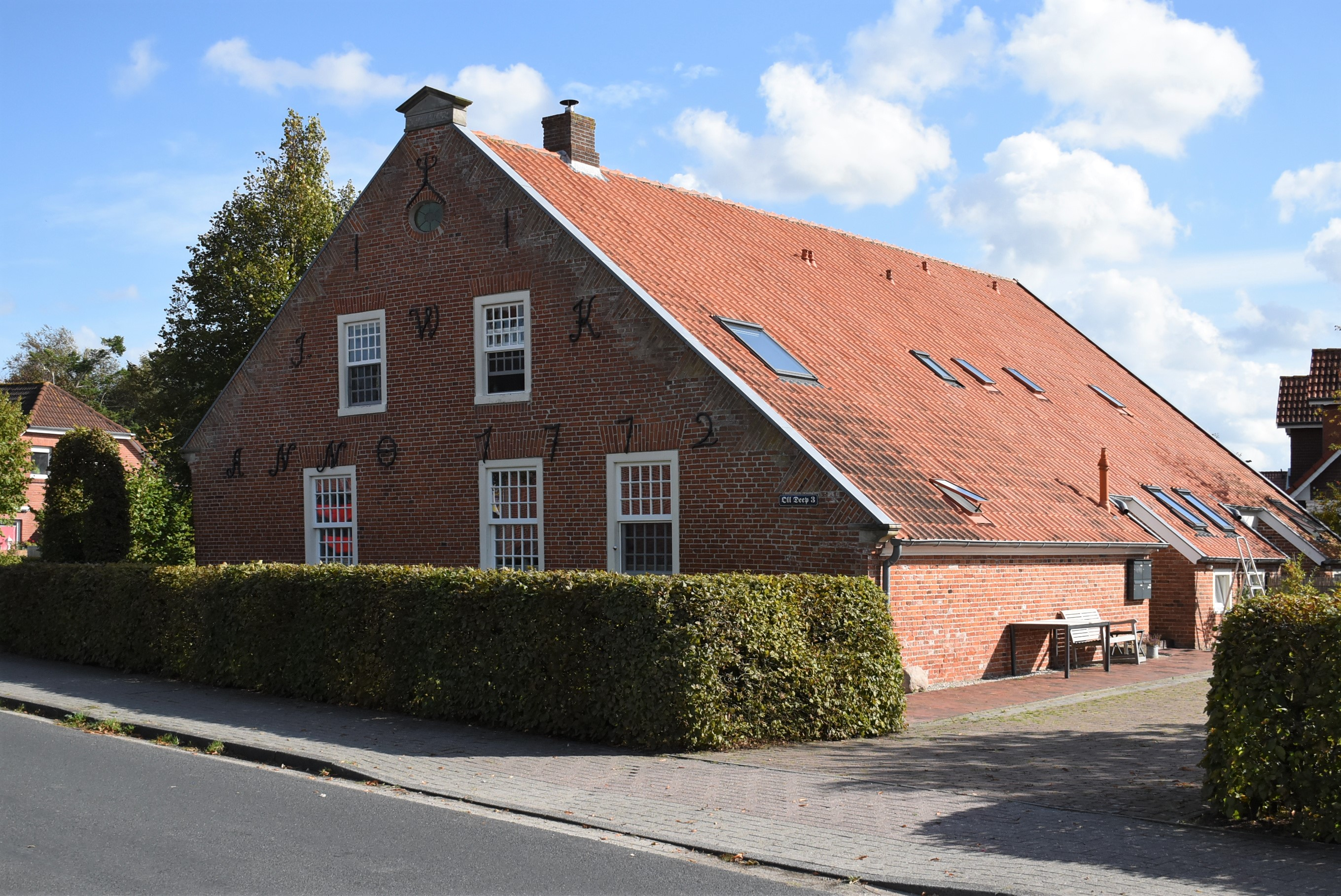
Sielhus
