= Ostermoordorf =

- Village of Großheide
- Interactive map of Ostermoordorf
- Location within Germany Location within Lower Saxony
- Coordinates: 53.56278°N 7.36517°E
- Country: Germany
- State: Lower Saxony
- District: Aurich
- Municipality: Großheide
- Elevation: 3 m (9.8 ft)
- Time zone: UTC+01:00 (CET)
  - Summer (DST): UTC+02:00 (CEST)
- Dialling codes: 04936
- Vehicle registration: 26532

Ostermoordorf is an East Frisian village in Lower Saxony, Germany. It is an Ortsteil of the municipality of Großheide, in the Aurich district. It is located directly to the east of Berumerfehn.

Ostermoordorf was founded around 1790 as a peat colony and was first recorded in 1818 as Ostermoorrott. The current name has been documented since 1852. The village in the moor got its name due to its location east of the Berumerfehn canal.
