= Roggenstede =

- Village of Dornum
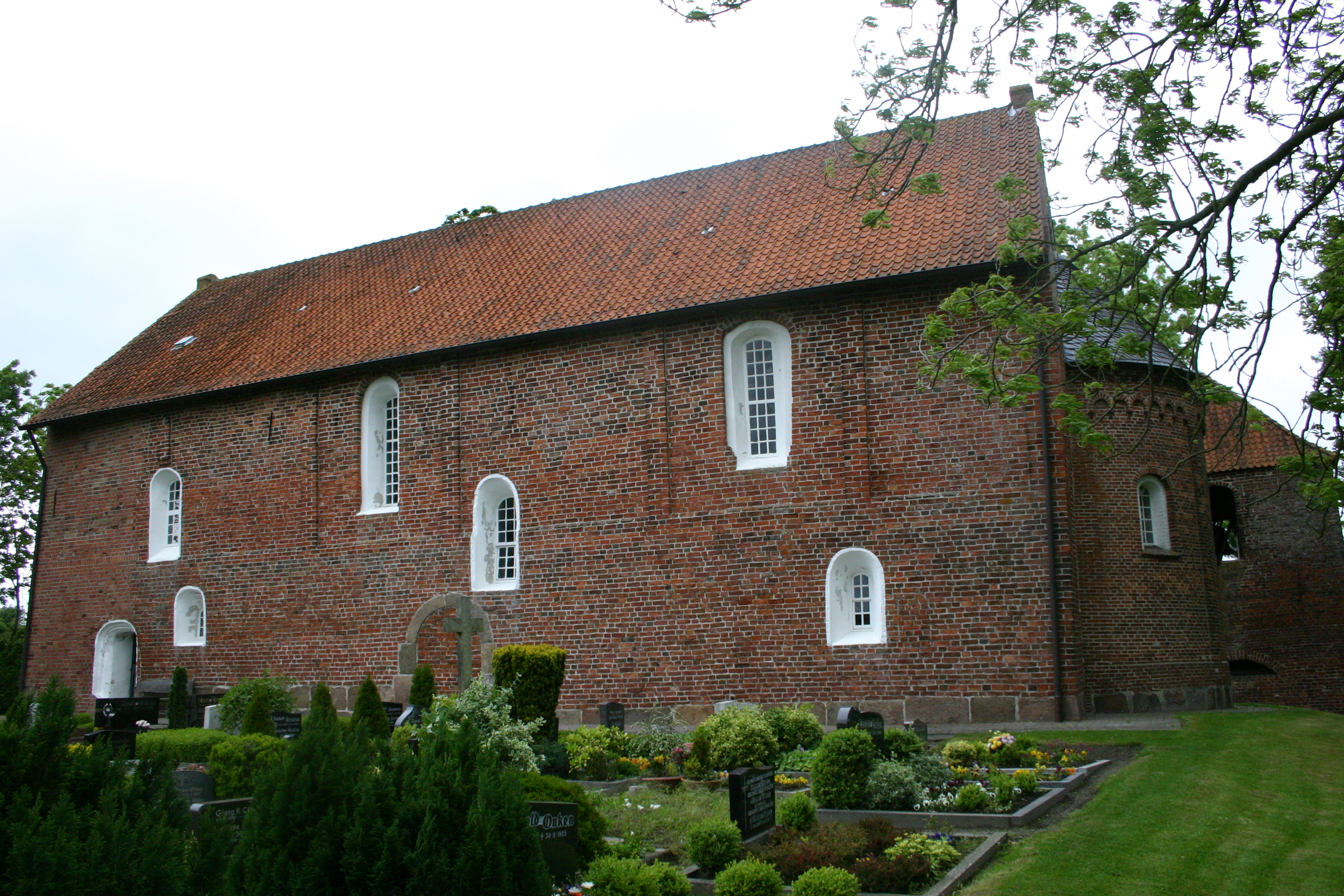
- Roggenstede Church

- Coat of arms
- Interactive map of Roggenstede
- Location within Germany Location within Lower Saxony
- Coordinates: 53.63147°N 7.48642°E
- Country: Germany
- State: Lower Saxony
- District: Aurich
- Municipality: Dornum

Area
  - Metro: 5.7 km^{2} (2.2 sq mi)
- Elevation: 4 m (13 ft)

Population
  - Metro: 305
- Time zone: UTC+01:00 (CET)
  - Summer (DST): UTC+02:00 (CEST)
- Dialling codes: 04933
- Vehicle registration: 26553

Roggenstede (East Frisian Low Saxon: Roggstee) is an East Frisian village in Lower Saxony, Germany. It is an Ortsteil of the municipality of Dornum, in the district of Aurich. Roggenstede is located about 2 kilometers southeast of Dornum.

== Geography ==
The place is bounded by the Dornumersieler Tief in the north/northeast, the Schleitief in the southeast, the Otjetief in the South, the Alte Tief in the West and covers an area of about 5.7 square kilometers. The distance to the Wadden Sea is about 5.5 kilometers. Neighbouring places are Fulkum, Utarp, and Westerbur.

== Etymology ==
Roggenstede was first listed in 1420 in the Stader Copiar as Reckenstede among the parishes required to pay taxes to the Bremen Cathedral. Later names were Roggenstädt or Roggenstedt (c. 1650) and then from about 1750 Roggenstede. An older interpretation of the place name as "place where rye grows" is not credible. More likely is the interpretation of the name as "place" of Rocke or Recko.
