= Dornumergrode =

- Village of Dornum
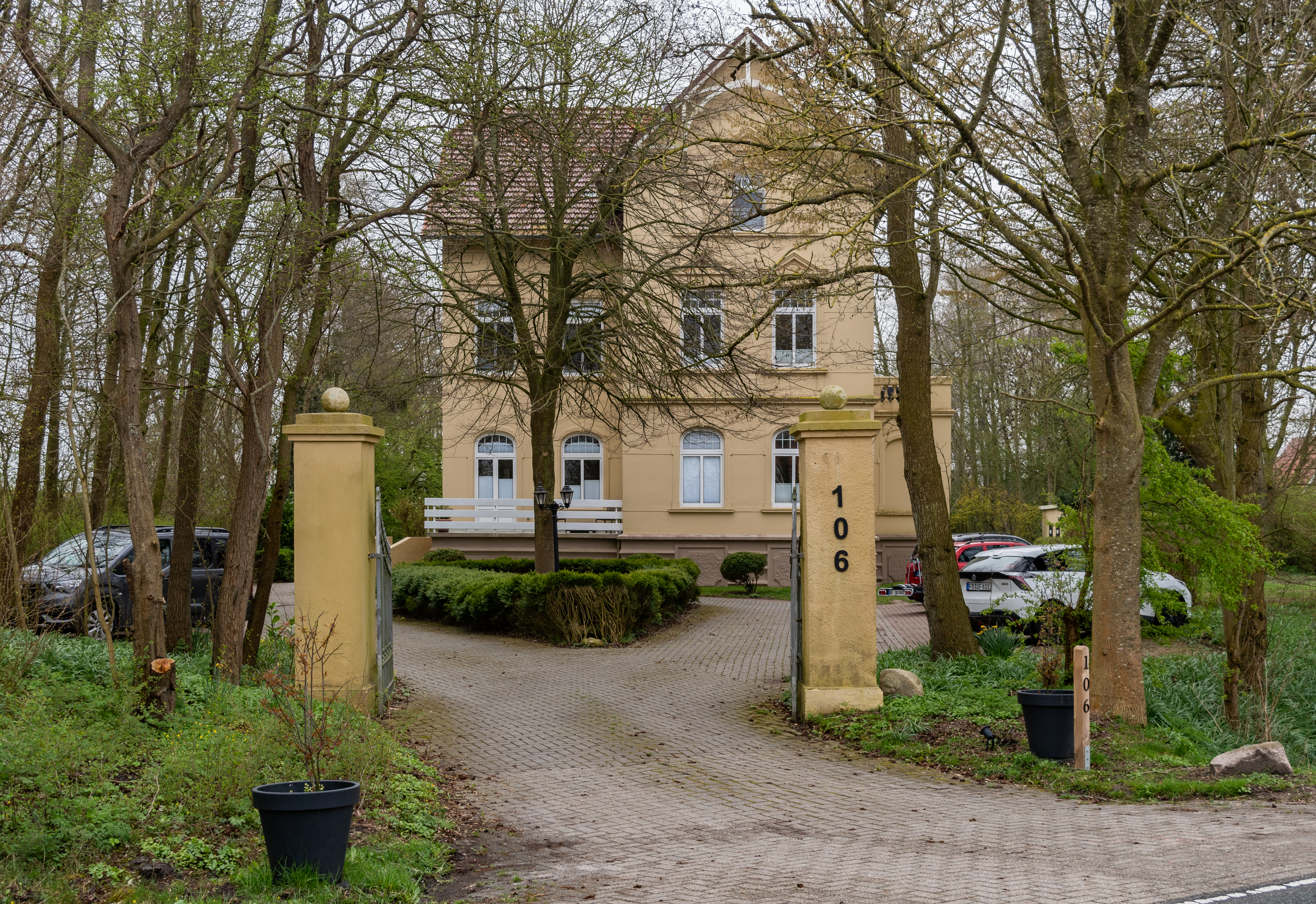
- Villa Dühringshof in Dornumergrode

- Coat of arms
- Interactive map of Dornumergrode
- Location within Germany Location within Lower Saxony
- Coordinates: 53.67199°N 7.44032°E
- Country: Germany
- State: Lower Saxony
- District: Aurich
- Municipality: Dornum

Area
  - Metro: 11.08 km^{2} (4.28 sq mi)
- Elevation: 2 m (6.6 ft)

Population
  - Metro: 299
- Time zone: UTC+01:00 (CET)
  - Summer (DST): UTC+02:00 (CEST)
- Dialling codes: 04933
- Vehicle registration: 26553

Dornumergrode is an East Frisian village near the Wadden Sea coast in Lower Saxony, Germany. It is an Ortsteil of the municipality of Dornum, in the Aurich district.

== Geography ==
Dornumergrode is located about one kilometer south of the Wadden Sea coast. The main town of the municipality, Dornum, is about three kilometers away to the south. The village was founded on a long mound surrounded by limestone marsh. Dornumergrode is located on the Störtebekerstraße. Today, the small village is a collection of farms and holiday homes.

== History ==
The settlement was first mentioned in documents in 1443 as Astragroda. The current spelling has been in use since 1528/30. The area of today's local area was probably finally embanked in 1570. However, there must have been attempts to embankment before then, as old dyke lines indicate.

On 1 July 1972, Dornumergrode was incorporated into the municipality of Dornumersiel. On 1 November 2001, this became part of the municipality of Dornum.

== Gallery ==
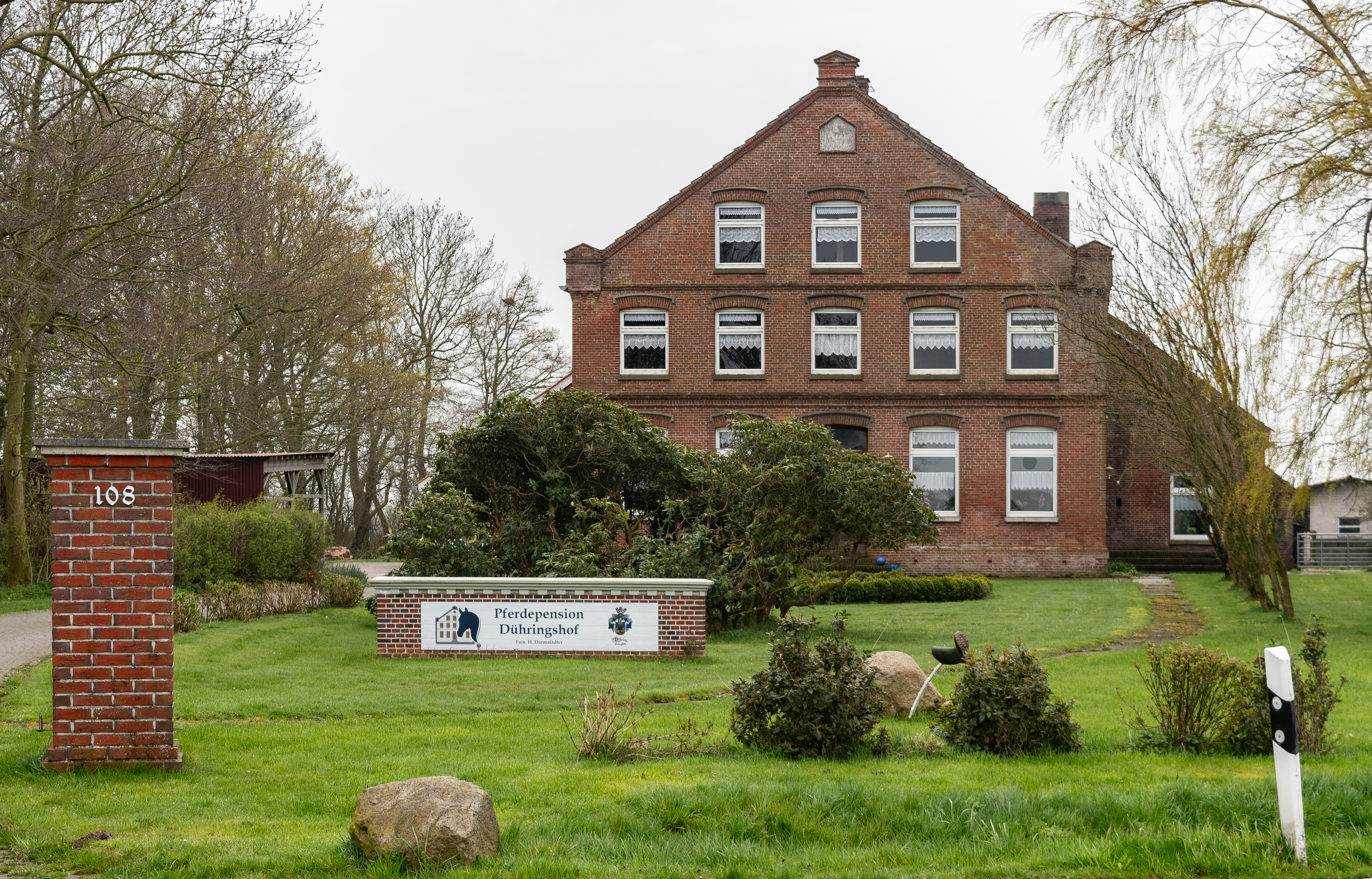
Farmhouse

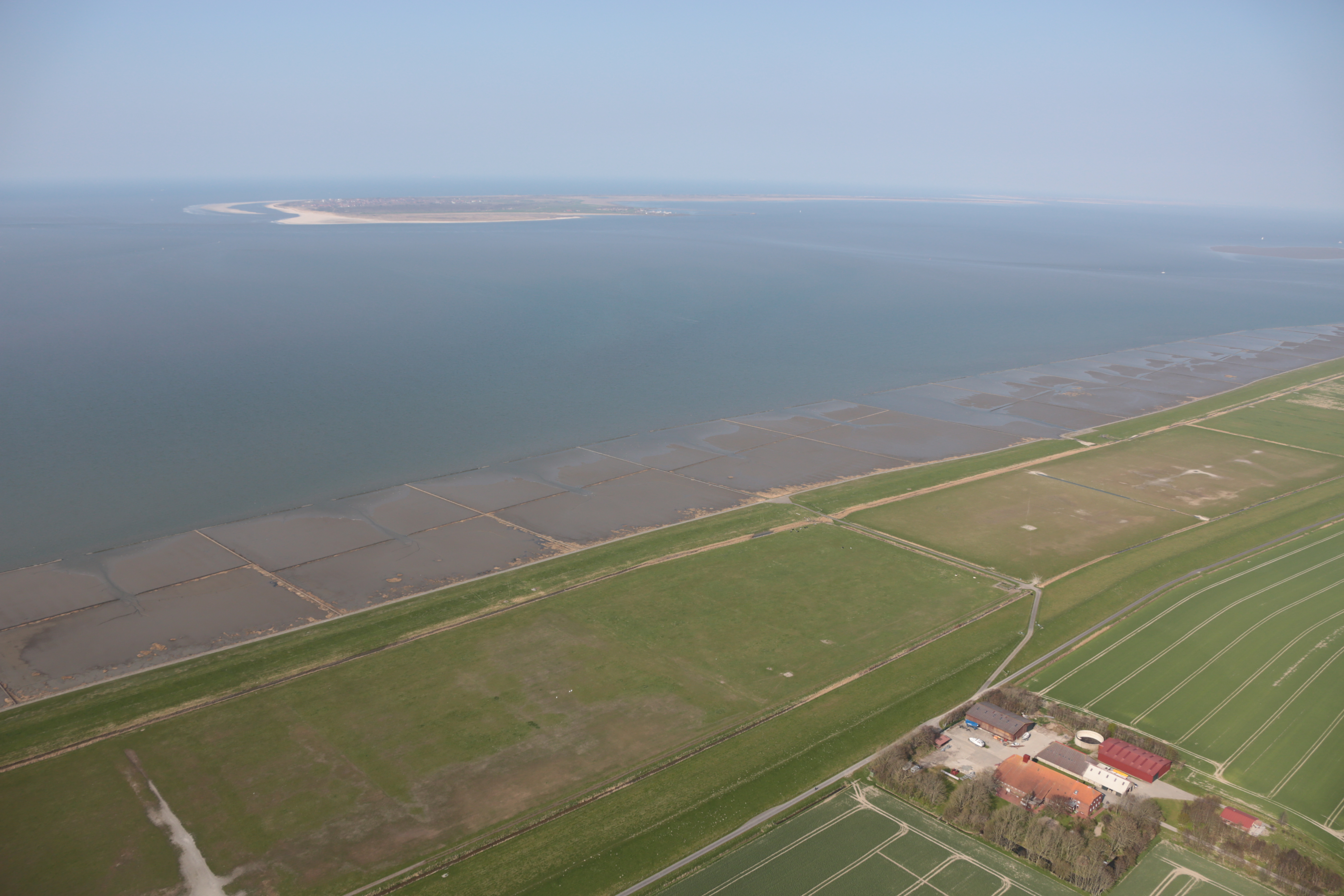
Coastline near Dornumergrode
