= Westdorf, Dornum =

Westdorf
- Village of Dornum
- Coat of arms
- Interactive map of Westdorf
- Location within Germany Location within Lower Saxony
- Coordinates: 53.64418°N 7.31926°E
- Country: Germany
- State: Lower Saxony
- District: Aurich
- Municipality: Dornum

Area
  - Metro: 8.3 km^{2} (3.2 sq mi)
- Elevation: 3 m (9.8 ft)

Population
  - Metro: 180
- Time zone: UTC+01:00 (CET)
  - Summer (DST): UTC+02:00 (CEST)
- Dialling codes: 04938
- Vehicle registration: 26553

Westdorf is an East Frisian village in Lower Saxony, Germany. It is an Ortsteil of the municipality of Dornum, in the district of Aurich. Administratively, the settlement of Ostdorf, located just to the east, belongs to the district of Westdorf.

== Etymology ==
The warft on which Westdorp is built, which was already settled during the age of the Roman Empire, was first documented in 1447 as up Dorpum. Later names were Westerdorp (1552), Wesdorp (1589), Westorp (1599) and Westdorff (1645). It is a combination of the direction "west" with "village" (=dorf).
