= Osteel =

- Municipality
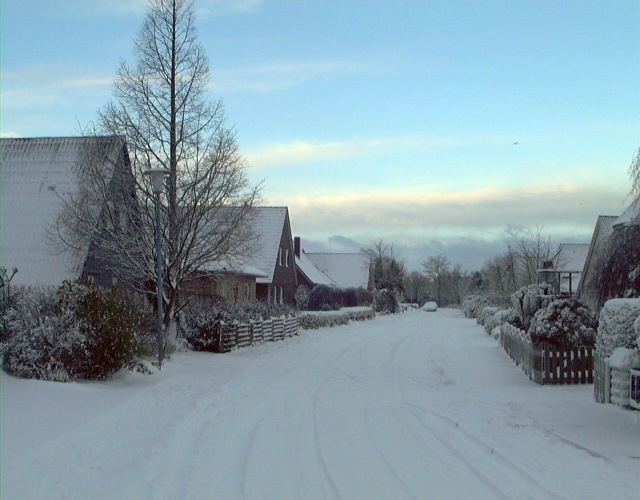

- Flag Coat of arms

- Location of Osteel within Aurich district
- Interactive map of Osteel
- Location within Germany Location within Lower Saxony
- Coordinates: 53.54323°N 7.25289°E
- Country: Germany
- State: Lower Saxony
- District: Aurich
- Municipal assoc.: Brookmerland

Government
  - Mayor: Ida Bienhoff-Topp

Area
  - Total: 19.9 km^{2} (7.7 sq mi)
- Elevation: 1 m (3.3 ft)

Population (2025-12-31)
  - Total: 2,052
  - Density: 103/km^{2} (267/sq mi)
- Time zone: UTC+01:00 (CET)
  - Summer (DST): UTC+02:00 (CEST)
- Postal codes: 26529
- Dialling codes: 04920, 04931, 04934 (mainly)
- Vehicle registration: AUR

Osteel is a municipality in the district of Aurich, in Lower Saxony, Germany.

== History ==
The village was first mentioned in 1164. The early settlement was on the edge of a moor.

The arms of the municipality shows a golden crown at the top on a blue background. In the centre is a golden hammer. Left and right of each is a golden trifoliate clover. The clovers point to the agricultural sector.

== Attractions ==
A landmark of the village is Warnfried Church, dated to the 12th century. The church has a length of 63 meters and is dedicated to Saint Werenfried. The Organ of the Church is the second oldest in Ostfriesland. It was built in 1619 by Master Edo Evers.

Outside the church stands a monument to the astronomers David and Johannes Fabricius. David first documented several stars and drew one of the first maps of East Frisia. His son Johannes first discovered sunspots with the aid of a telescope.

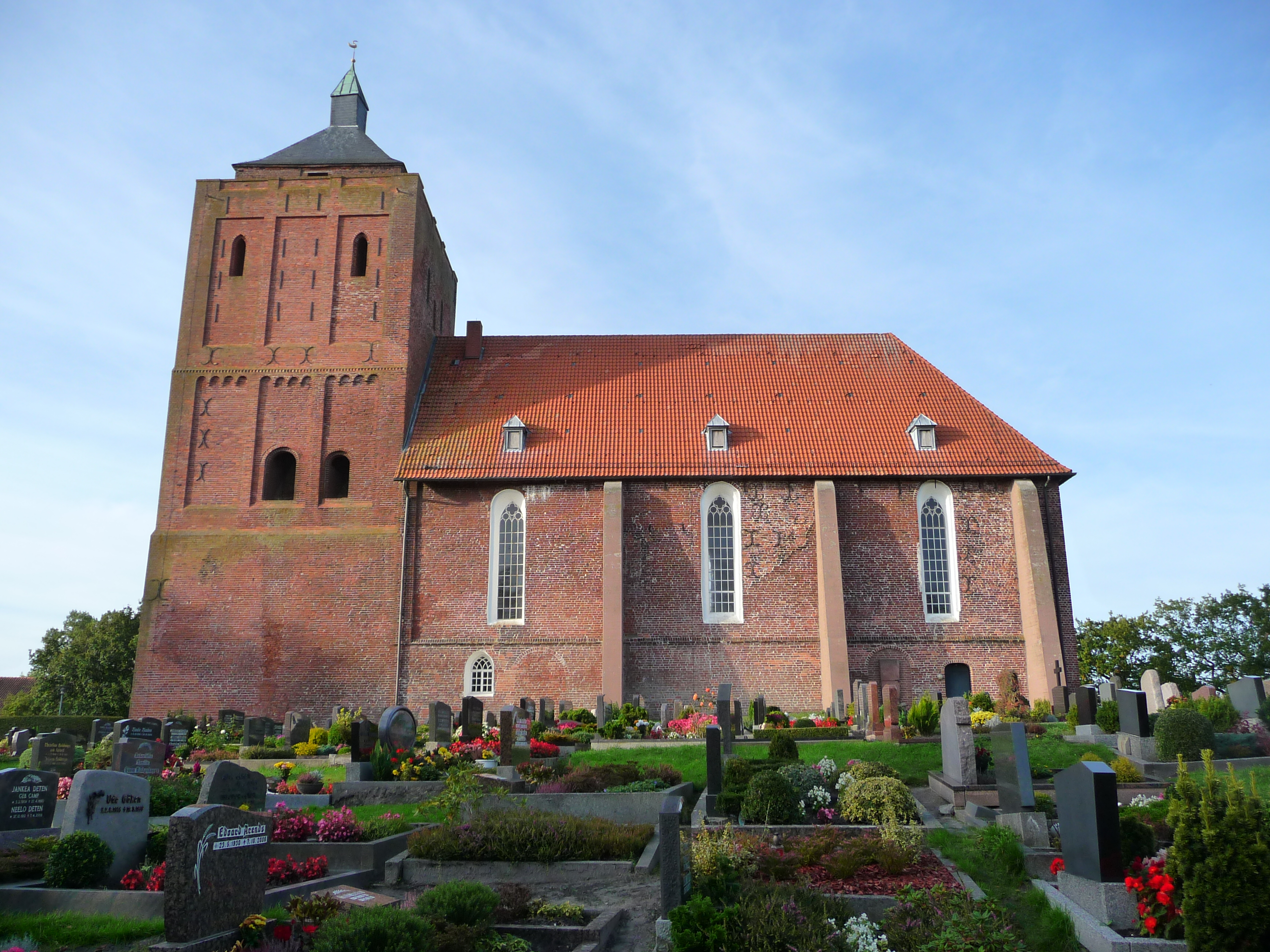
Warmfried Church

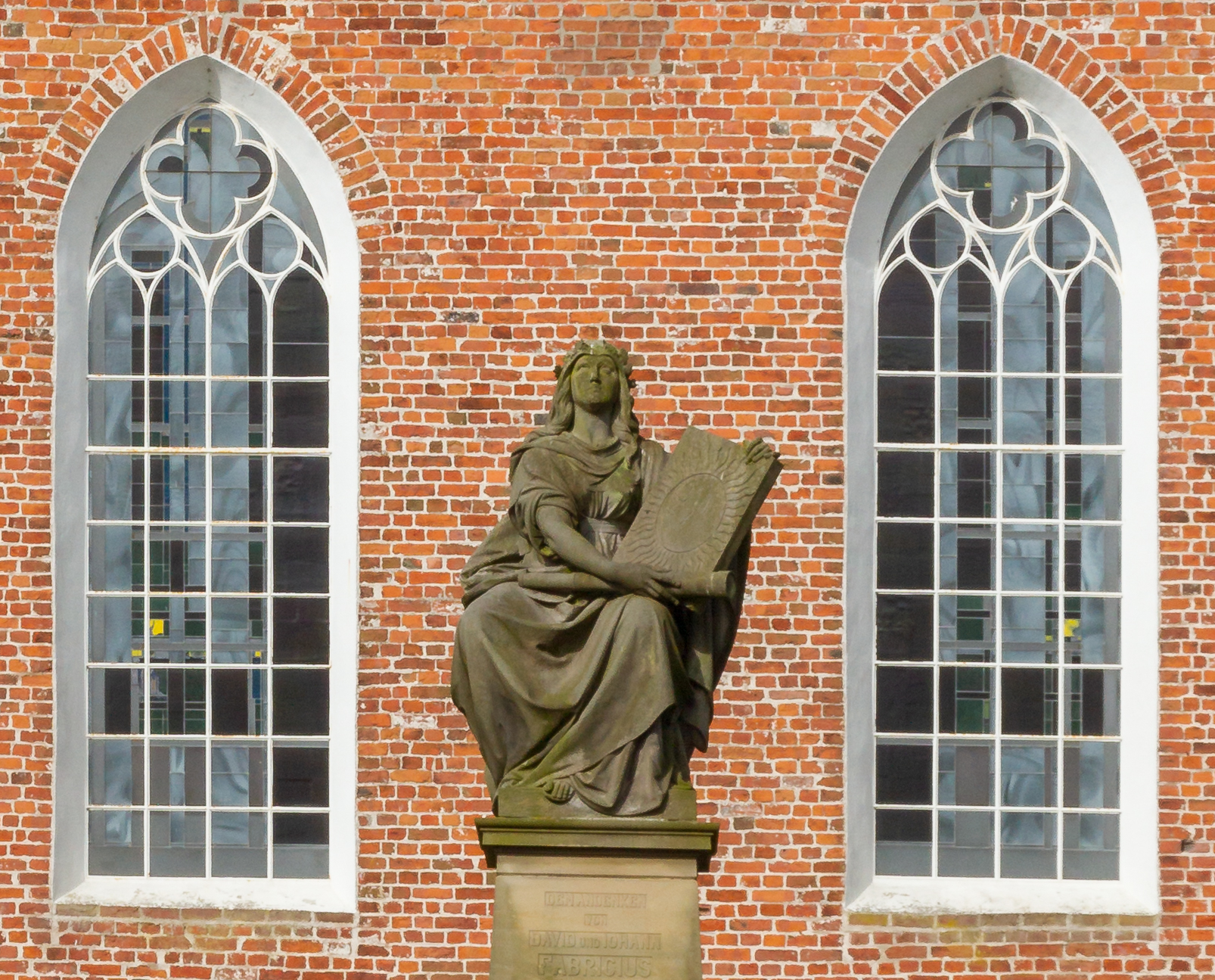
Monument to David and Johannes Fabricus outside the church

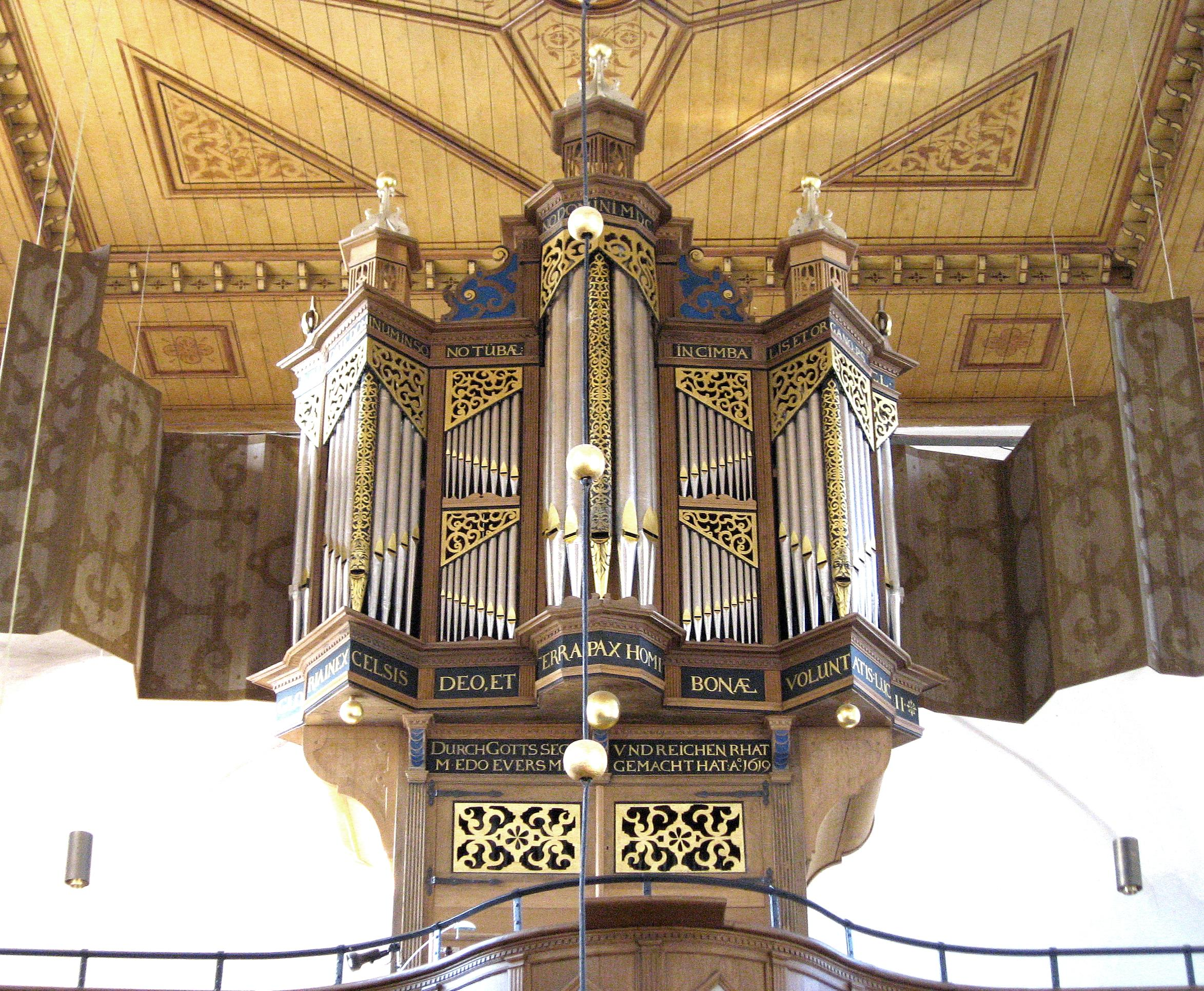
Church organ

== Transport ==
The main town is on the Osteel Bundesstraße 72 about six miles south of the old town. Railway lines connect it to Emden. After the closure of the station in 1978, the next station is now in three km south at Marienhafe.

== Notable people ==
- David Fabricius (1564–1617), astronomer
- Johannes Fabricius (1587–1617), astronomer
- Friedrich Vissering (1826–1885), Reichstagsabgeordneter
- Dirk Agena, (1889–1934), Politician and Reichstagsabgeordneter
- Siemen Rühaak (1950-), actor
