= Westermoordorf =

- Village of Großheide
- Interactive map of Westermoordorf
- Location within Germany Location within Lower Saxony
- Coordinates: 53.56771°N 7.32086°E
- Country: Germany
- State: Lower Saxony
- District: Aurich
- Municipality: Großheide
- Elevation: 2 m (6.6 ft)
- Time zone: UTC+01:00 (CET)
  - Summer (DST): UTC+02:00 (CEST)
- Vehicle registration: 26532

Westermoordorf is a village (Ortsteil) of Großheide, a municipality in Lower Saxony, Germany. It is located about 1.5 kilometers northwest of the village of Berumerfehn.

== History ==
Settlement in Westermoordorf began in 1797. In 1848, 378 people lived in the settlement, spread across 74 houses. Since 1826, the peat colony founded has borne its current name, which means either "village in the western moor" or "western village in the moor".

The village has been part of the municipality of Großheide since the regional and administrative reform of 1 July 1972. Before that, it belonged to the municipality of Berumerfehn, which was incorporated into Großheide.
