= Schwittersum =

- Village of Dornum
- Coat of arms
- Interactive map of Schwittersum
- Location within Germany Location within Lower Saxony
- Coordinates: 53.63980°N 7.44086°E
- Country: Germany
- State: Lower Saxony
- District: Aurich
- Municipality: Dornum

Area
  - Metro: 6.2 km^{2} (2.4 sq mi)
- Elevation: 4 m (13 ft)

Population
  - Metro: 606
- Time zone: UTC+01:00 (CET)
  - Summer (DST): UTC+02:00 (CEST)
- Dialling codes: 04933
- Vehicle registration: 26553

Schwittersum is an East Frisian village in Lower Saxony, Germany. It is an Ortsteil of the municipality of Dornum, in the district of Aurich. Schwittersum is located directly to the southeast of Dornum, practically bordering its residential area.

== Etymology ==
The village, built on a warft, was first documented in 1442 as Swiderssum. Via Swittersum (1589), the settlement received its current name in 1645, which is composed of the first name Switter(t) and -heim ("place of residence").
