= Abelitz =

Abelitz may refer to:

- Abelitz (river), in East Frisia, Germany
- Abelitz (Südbrookmerland), a village in Südbrookmerland, East Frisia, Germany
