= Menstede-Coldinne =

- Village of Großheide
- Coat of arms
- Interactive map of Menstede-Coldinne
- Location within Germany Location within Lower Saxony
- Coordinates: 53.59716°N 7.37412°E
- Country: Germany
- State: Lower Saxony
- District: Aurich
- Municipality: Großheide

Area
  - Metro: 12.45 km^{2} (4.81 sq mi)
- Elevation: 4 m (13 ft)

Population
  - Metro: 1,293
- Time zone: UTC+01:00 (CET)
  - Summer (DST): UTC+02:00 (CEST)
- Vehicle registration: 26532

Menstede-Coldinne is a district (Ortsteile) of the municipality of Großheide, in the district of Aurich, Lower Saxony, Germany. It mainly consists of the two villages Menstede and Coldinne. Other settlements in the district include Klosterdorf, Kölke, Breitefeld, Blinkheide, Coldinnergaste, Strück, and Westerbrande, together comprising an area of 12.45 km^{2}. The district is part of the municipality of Großheide since the 1972 Lower Saxony municipal reform, before that, it formed its own municipality.

== Etymology ==
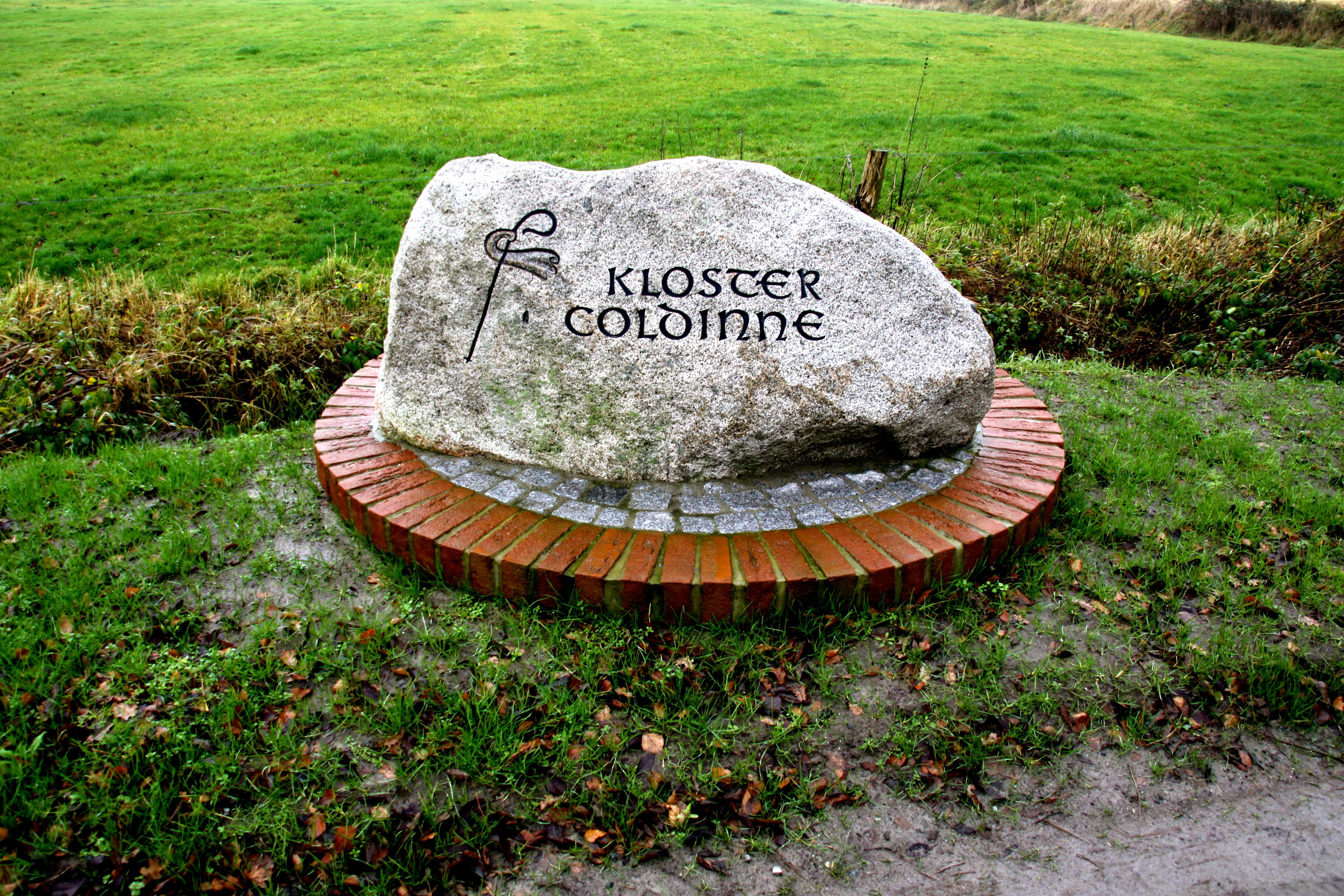
Memorial stone commemorating the Coldinne monastery

The place's name goes back to the Coldinne monastery. There are various theories about the interpretation of the name. It could either be a derivation from the name of the monastery ter waeren minne or it could be a Frisian-Low German field name that could be translated either as "cold meadow", "uninhabited house" or "uninhabited inn".

Menstede, on the other hand, is a combination of the first name Meene with Stelle ("place"), but could also mean "place of the Maane" ("community").
