= Wirdum, Germany =

Wirdum
- Municipality
- Flag Coat of arms

- Location of Wirdum within Aurich district
- Interactive map of Wirdum
- Location within Germany Location within Lower Saxony
- Coordinates: 53°28′39″N 7°12′18″E
- Country: Germany
- State: Lower Saxony
- District: Aurich
- Municipal assoc.: Brookmerland

Government
  - Mayor: Martin Tuitjer

Area
  - Total: 14.94 km^{2} (5.77 sq mi)
- Elevation: 0 m (0 ft)

Population (2025-12-31)
  - Total: 956
  - Density: 64.0/km^{2} (166/sq mi)
- Time zone: UTC+01:00 (CET)
  - Summer (DST): UTC+02:00 (CEST)
- Postal codes: 26529
- Dialling codes: 0 49 20
- Vehicle registration: AUR

Wirdum is a municipality in the district of Aurich, in Lower Saxony, Germany.

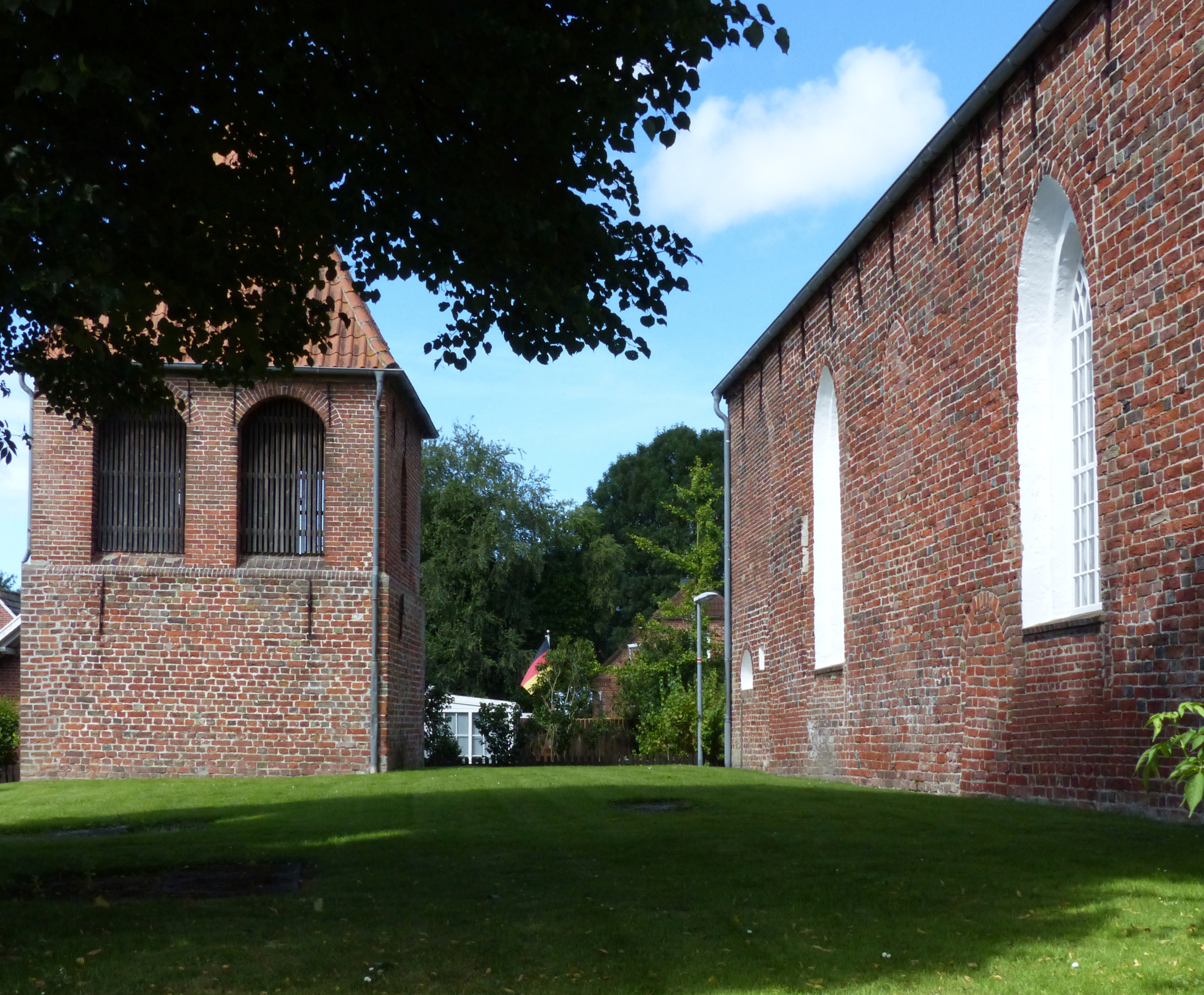
Village church, early 14th century

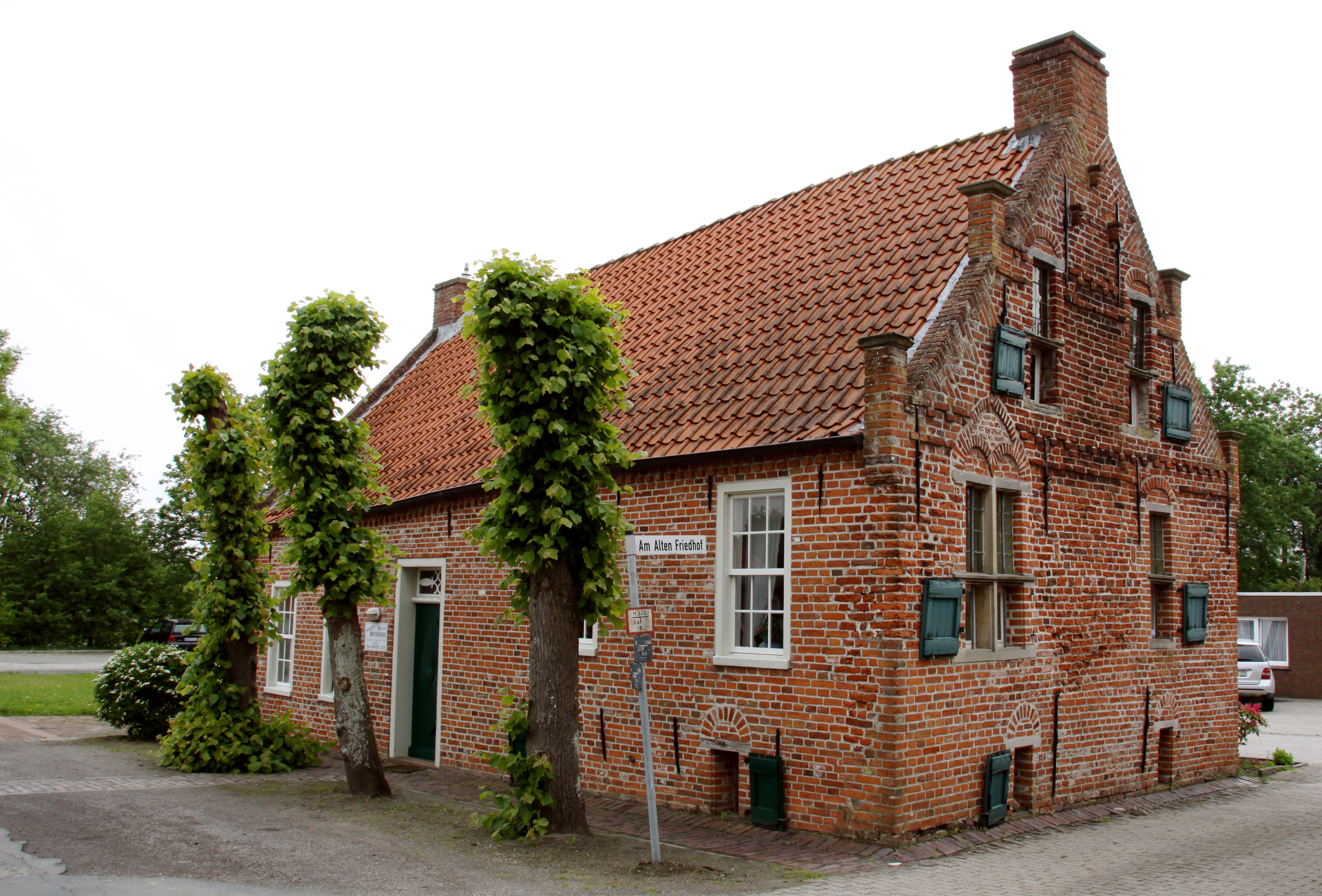
Former small castle, 15th century
