= Abelitz (river) =

River in Germany

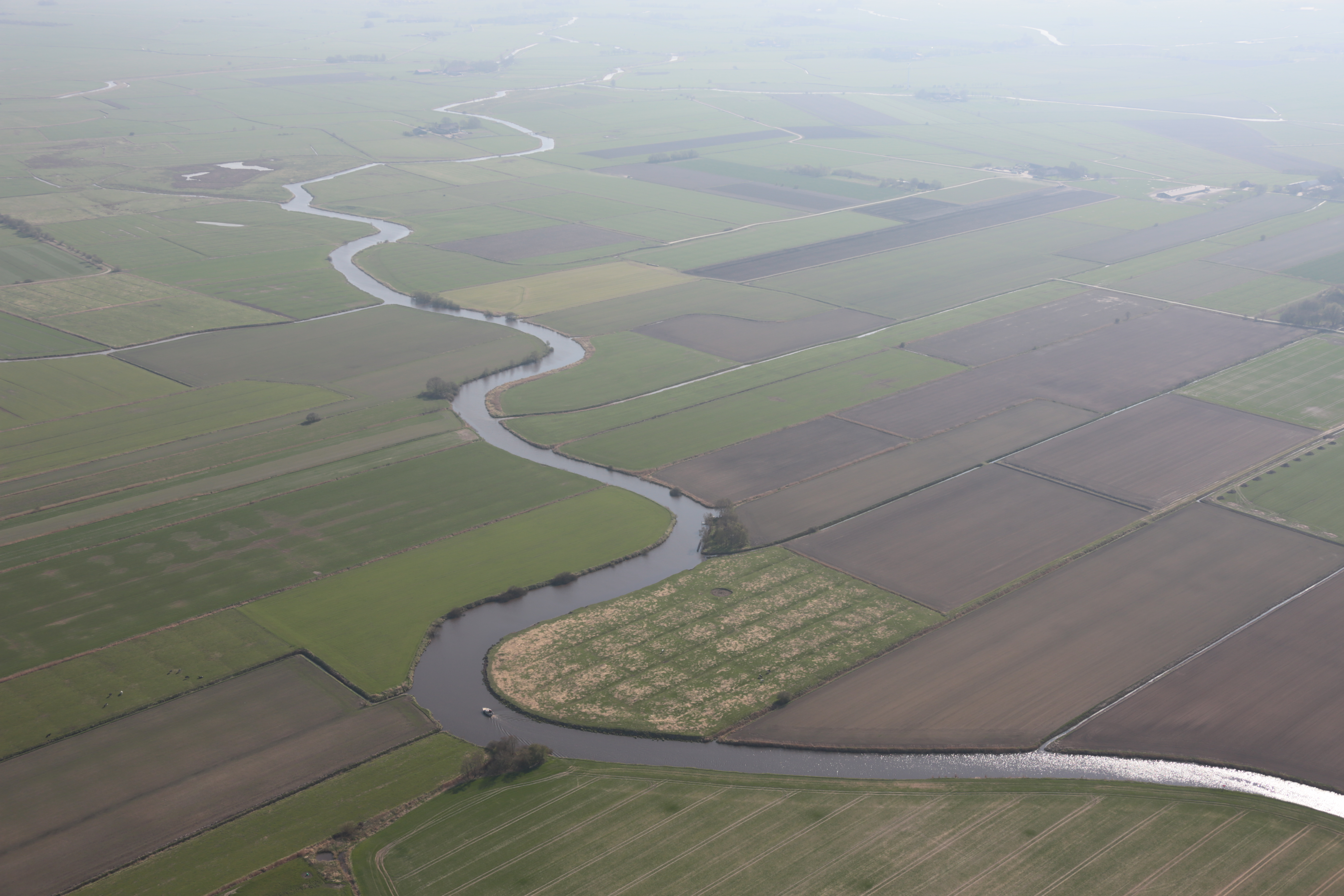
- Abelitz in Upgant-Schott (foreground) and Südbrookmerland (background, left)

- Mouth

Location
- Country: Germany
- Location: Lower Saxony

Physical characteristics
- Mouth: Altes Greetsieler Sieltief
  - coordinates: 53°27′45″N 7°13′43″E
- Length: ca. 20 km (12 mi)

Basin features
- Progression: Altes Greetsieler Sieltief→ Ems→ North Sea

The Abelitz (-litz = Leide = channel) is a river of Lower Saxony, Germany, in East Frisia. It is about 20 kilometres (12 mi) long and flows from Marienhafe to its mouth on the Alte Greetsieler Sieltief. This type of river that drains the low-lying polders through a sluice in the sea dyke is also known locally as a Tief and is often the course of an old creek between mudflats.

The Abelitz passes through Südbrookmerland, where it flows past the village of the same name, Abelitz, and the Krummhörn. It is 10 kilometres (6.2 mi) long, up to 12 metres (39 ft) wide, up to 1.50 metres (4.9 ft) deep and navigable by boats with a draught of 1.20 metres (3.9 ft) and maximum speed of 5 kilometres per hour (3.1 mph). The banks of the Abelitz are often near-natural and covered in reed beds. There are several parallel channels (Nebenläufe) that enclose small islands or run through wetlands. The river is very rich in fish and is well known as an angling area.

The bird life on and near the Abelitz is very diverse. During the breeding season riverside walkers and anglers are expected to conduct themselves considerately.

The Abelitz is linked to Moordorf by the Abelitz-Moordorf Canal.

== See also ==
- List of rivers of Lower Saxony
