= Dornum =

- Municipality
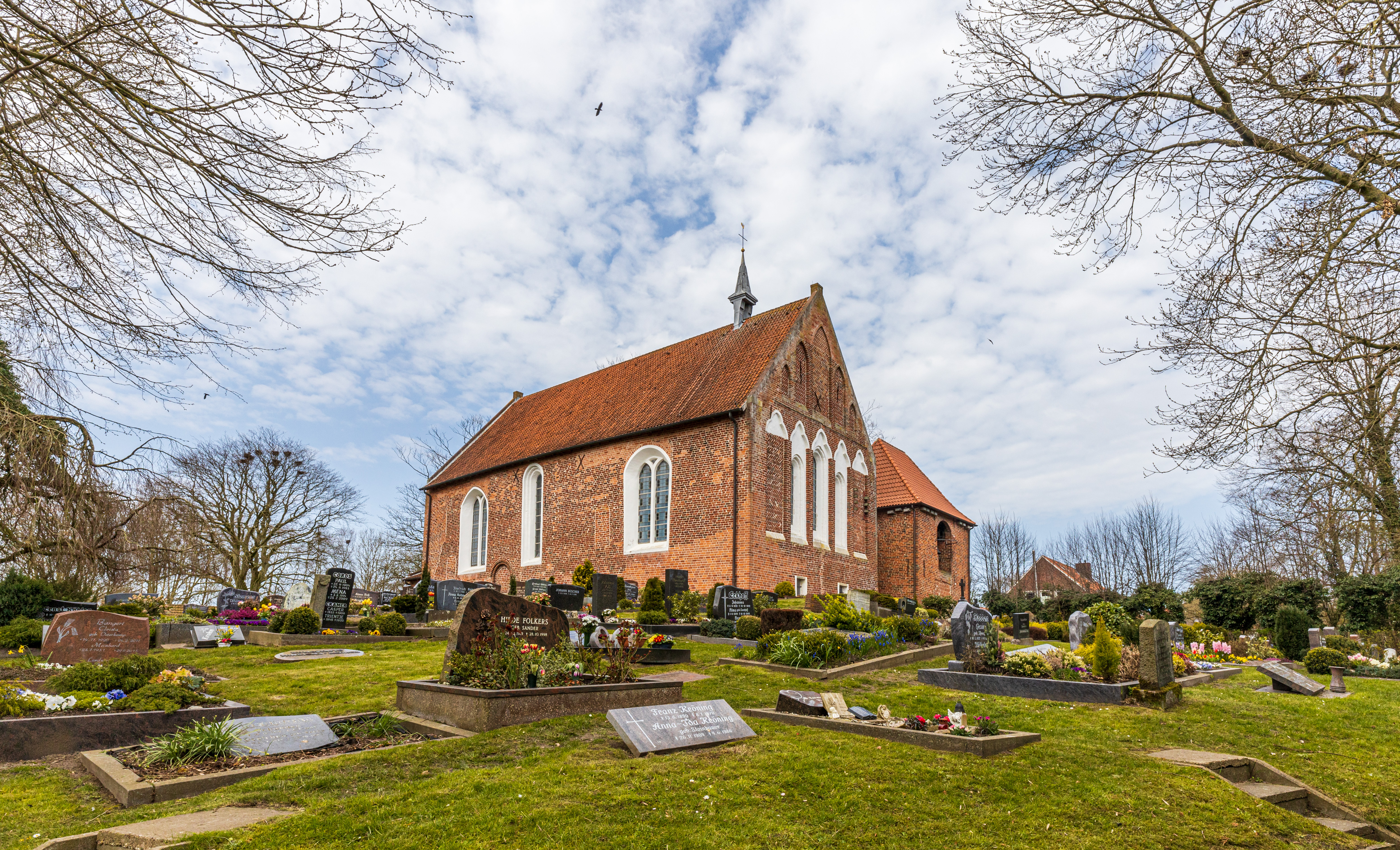
- St. Bartholomew's Church

- Flag Coat of arms

- Location of Dornum within Aurich district
- Interactive map of Dornum
- Location within Germany Location within Lower Saxony
- Coordinates: 53.64589°N 7.43022°E
- Country: Germany
- State: Lower Saxony
- District: Aurich
- Subdivisions: 8 districts

Government
  - Mayor (2021–26): Uwe Trännapp (SPD)

Area
  - Total: 69.32 km^{2} (26.76 sq mi)
- Elevation: 0 m (0 ft)

Population (2025-12-31)
  - Total: 4,340
  - Density: 62.6/km^{2} (162/sq mi)
- Time zone: UTC+01:00 (CET)
  - Summer (DST): UTC+02:00 (CEST)
- Postal codes: 26553
- Dialling codes: 0 49 33, 0 49 38 (Sielrott, Westdorf)
- Vehicle registration: AUR
- Website: www.dornum.de

Dornum is a village and a municipality in the East Frisian district of Aurich, in Lower Saxony, Germany. It is located near the North Sea coast, approx. 15 km east of Norden, and 20 km north of Aurich.

== Division of the municipality ==
The municipality is divided into ten districts, namely: Dornumergrode, Dornumersiel/Westeraccumersiel, Nesse, Neßmersiel, Roggenstede, Schwittersum, Westdorf (including Ostdorf), Westeraccum, and Westerbur (including Middelsbur).

== Notable places ==
Dornum is home to the Lutheran St. Bartholomaeus Church. This church contains an organ built by Gerhard von Holy. The organ is now considered a national treasure.

Dornum also houses the only surviving synagogue building in East Frisia. The synagogue was deconsecrated and sold on 7 November 1938 for 600 Reichsmarks to the neighboring master carpenter August Tessmer, who subsequently used it as a storeroom. Nevertheless, on Kristallnacht, the windows of the building were smashed in, and the remaining furnishings were taken out of the building and burned on the market square. Sturmabteilung troops arrested all the Jewish residents of the town that night and deported them to neighboring Norden, where other Jews from the district were also rounded up. The elderly, women, and children were released on the morning of 10 November; the men were deported to Sachsenhausen concentration camp, from which they only returned weeks later. In the period that followed, the last Jews tried, as far as they were able, to leave Dornum or Germany. On 13 September 1939, 8 Jewish fellow citizens were still living in Dornum.

The receiving terminal for gas through Europipe I and II lies at Dornum. From here, gas is transported through a 48-kilometer-long pipeline to Emden for quality and volume metering. From here the gas is routed to customers’ gas grids. The Czech Republic and Austria receive gas through Europipe II at Dornum. The Czechs take over the gas here for onward transport via the German St Katerina gas grid, at the German-Czech border. Austria takes over the gas at the German-Austrian border at Oberkappel.

== Transport ==
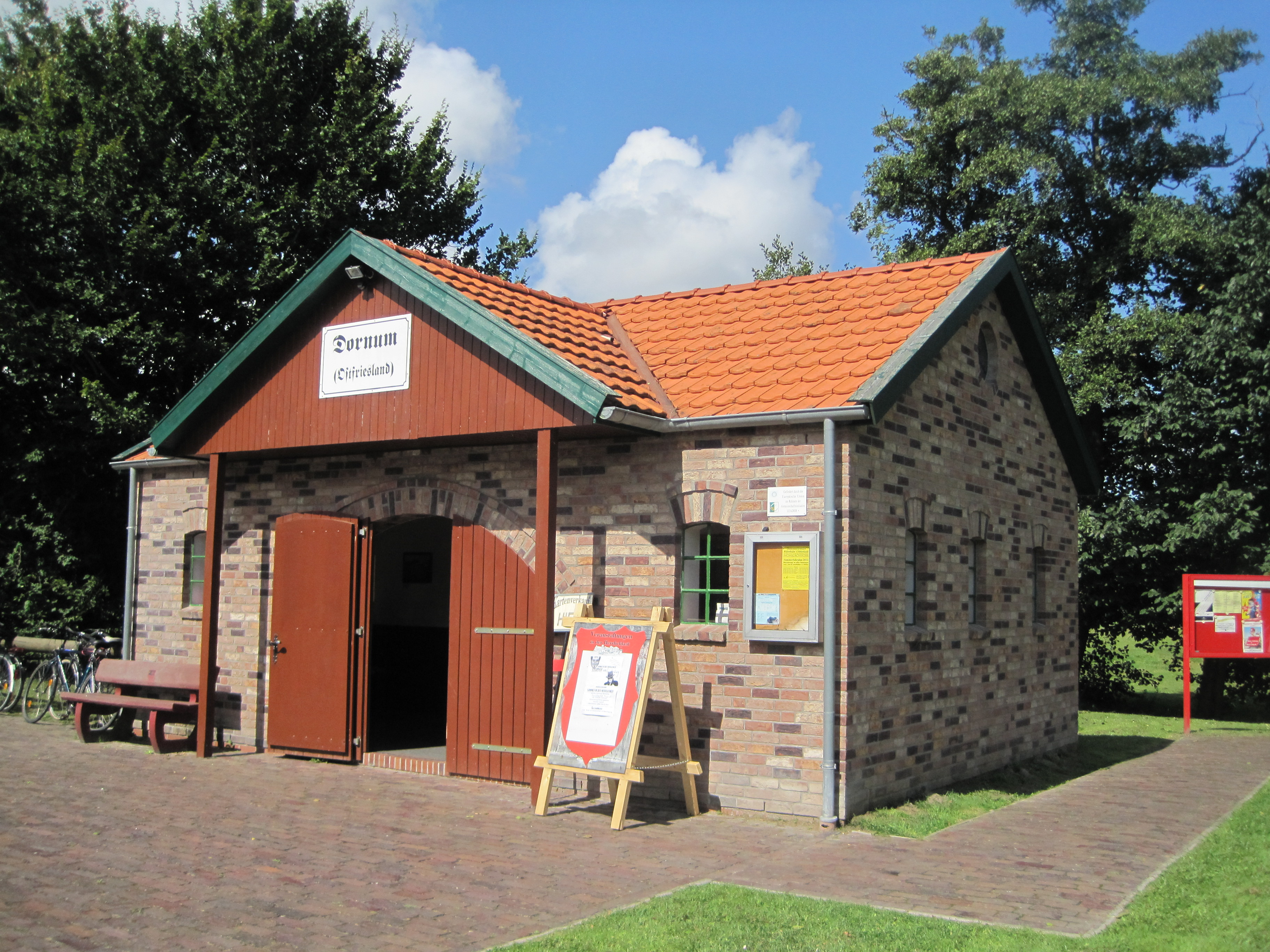
Dornum train station

The Dornum train station is located on the East Frisean Coastal railway (Norden - Dornum - Wittmund - Jever - Sande), although the section from Norden to Dornum is only in service for special train rides and from Dornum to Esens deconstructed. Dornum has access to the local bus network and is located in the area of the transport association Verkehrsverbund Ems-Jade (VEJ).

== Notable residents ==
Miene Schönberg (later known as Minnie Marx), was born in Dornum in 1865; she was the mother of the Marx Brothers. Her brother Al Shean was also born in Dornum, in 1868.

== Gallery ==
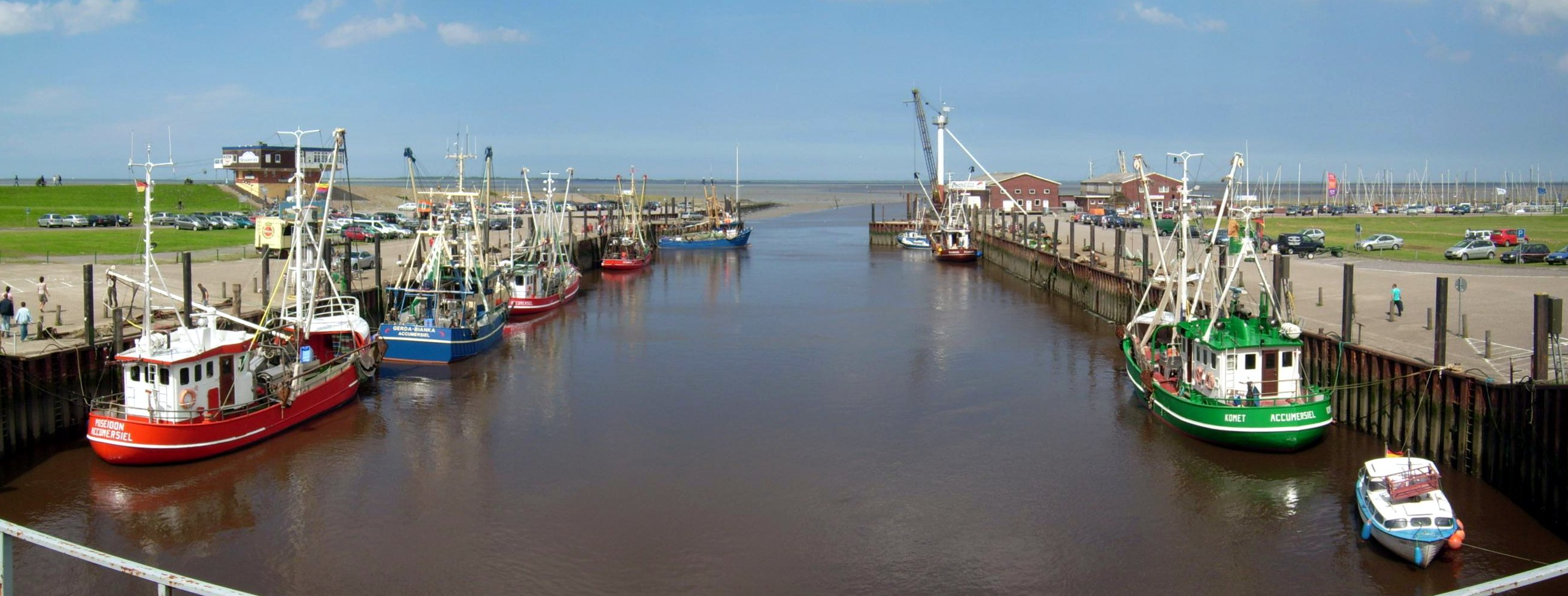
Fishing harbour at Dornumersiel

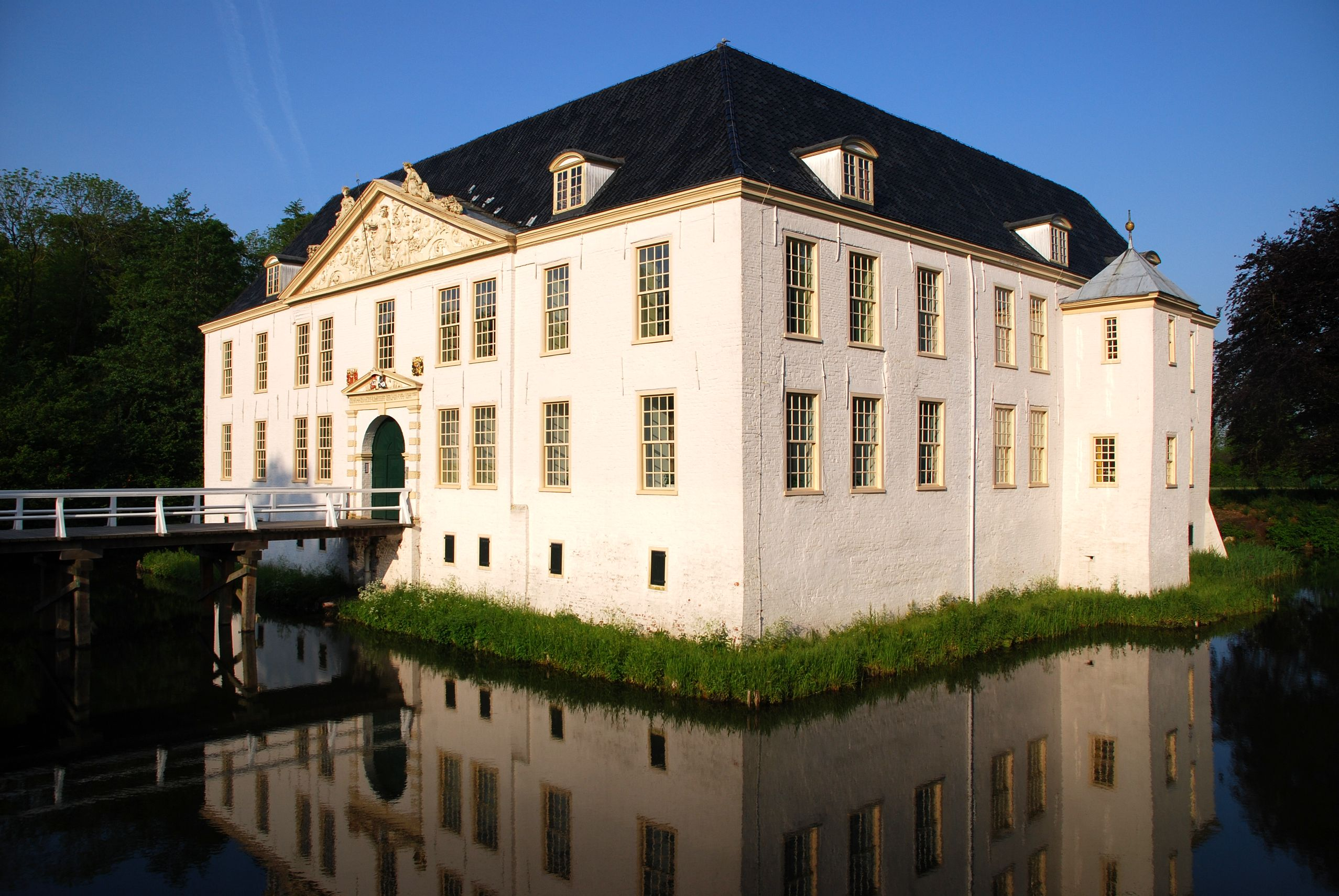
Main building of the Norderburg Castle

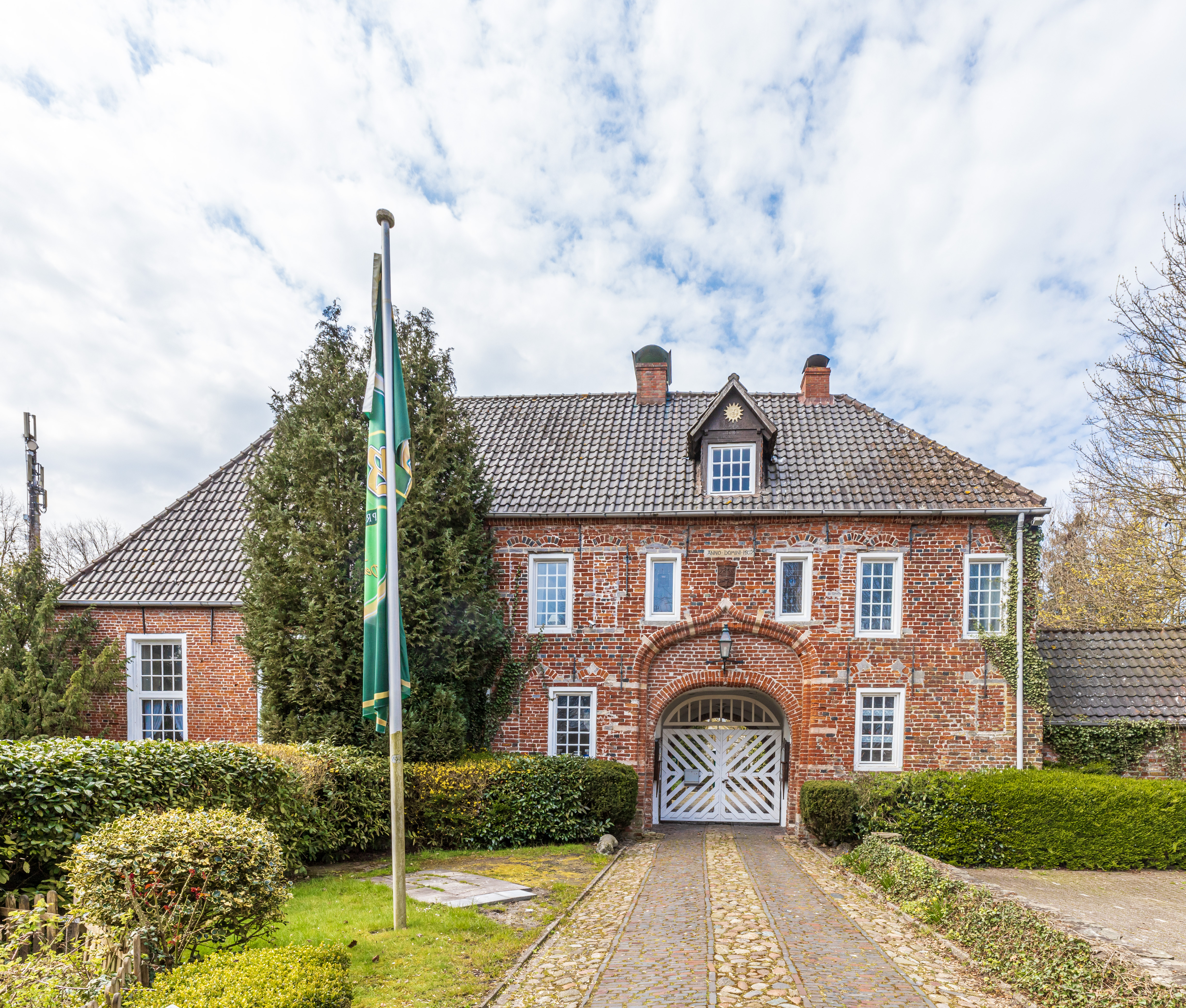
Beningaburg Castle
