= Upgant-Schott =

- Municipality
- Coat of arms

- Location of Upgant-Schott within Aurich district
- Interactive map of Upgant-Schott
- Location within Germany Location within Lower Saxony
- Coordinates: 53.51437°N 7.26719°E
- Country: Germany
- State: Lower Saxony
- District: Aurich
- Municipal assoc.: Brookmerland

Government
  - Mayor: Otto Thiele (SPD)

Area
  - Total: 24.78 km^{2} (9.57 sq mi)
- Elevation: 1 m (3.3 ft)

Population (2025-12-31)
  - Total: 3,525
  - Density: 142.3/km^{2} (368.4/sq mi)
- Time zone: UTC+01:00 (CET)
  - Summer (DST): UTC+02:00 (CEST)
- Postal codes: 26529
- Dialling codes: 04934
- Vehicle registration: AUR

Upgant-Schott is a municipality in the district of Aurich, in Lower Saxony, Germany.

== Origin of the name ==
Upgant-Schott was first mentioned in the records in AD 945 as Cuppargent in the endowment register of Fulda Abbey. The name Upgant probably refers to a small stream called the Gant, the course of which is the subject of various theories. For example, it could have come from Siegelsum (a village incorporated in 1969) via the Bollandswater west of Schottjer Grode into the Abelitz; it could however also have come from the raised bog that lies east of Upgant and be identical with the present-day Upganter Zugschloot. This is supported by the word Upgant (East Frisian: up de Gant, German: auf/über der Gant i.e. on or above the Gant). The word Schott comes from the Low German word scheten ("throw"). The earth thrown up from a ditch acted as a kind of embankment along the bank and was formerly called a Schott.
