= Rechtsupweg =

- Municipality
- Coat of arms

- Location of Rechtsupweg within Aurich district
- Interactive map of Rechtsupweg
- Location within Germany Location within Lower Saxony
- Coordinates: 53°31′46″N 7°19′36″E
- Country: Germany
- State: Lower Saxony
- District: Aurich
- Municipal assoc.: Brookmerland

Government
  - Mayor: Karl-Edzard Walzer (SPD)

Area
  - Total: 5.13 km^{2} (1.98 sq mi)
- Elevation: 1 m (3.3 ft)

Population (2025-12-31)
  - Total: 1,999
  - Density: 390/km^{2} (1,010/sq mi)
- Time zone: UTC+01:00 (CET)
  - Summer (DST): UTC+02:00 (CEST)
- Postal codes: 26529
- Dialling codes: 04934
- Vehicle registration: AUR

Rechtsupweg is a municipality in the district of Aurich, in Lower Saxony, Germany.
