= Leezdorf =

- Municipality
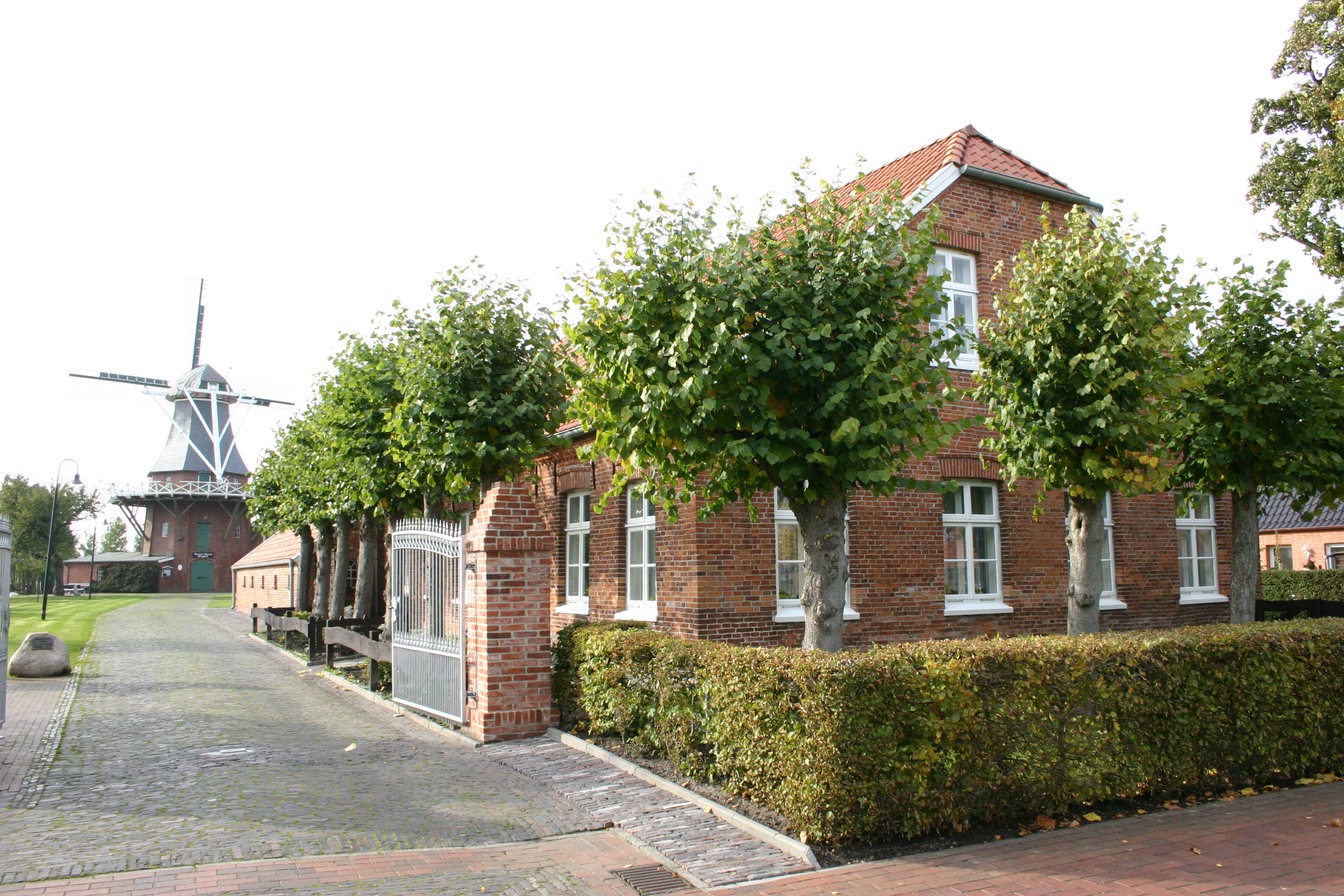
- Mill farm in Leezdorf

- Flag Coat of arms

- Location of Leezdorf within Aurich district
- Interactive map of Leezdorf
- Location within Germany Location within Lower Saxony
- Coordinates: 53°32′50″N 7°17′43″E
- Country: Germany
- State: Lower Saxony
- District: Aurich
- Municipal assoc.: Brookmerland

Government
  - Mayor: Manfred Wirringa (SPD)

Area
  - Total: 8.45 km^{2} (3.26 sq mi)
- Elevation: 1 m (3.3 ft)

Population (2025-12-31)
  - Total: 1,789
  - Density: 212/km^{2} (548/sq mi)
- Time zone: UTC+01:00 (CET)
  - Summer (DST): UTC+02:00 (CEST)
- Postal codes: 26529
- Dialling codes: 04934
- Vehicle registration: AUR

Leezdorf is a municipality in the district of Aurich, in Lower Saxony, Germany.
