= Berumerfehn =

- Village of Großheide
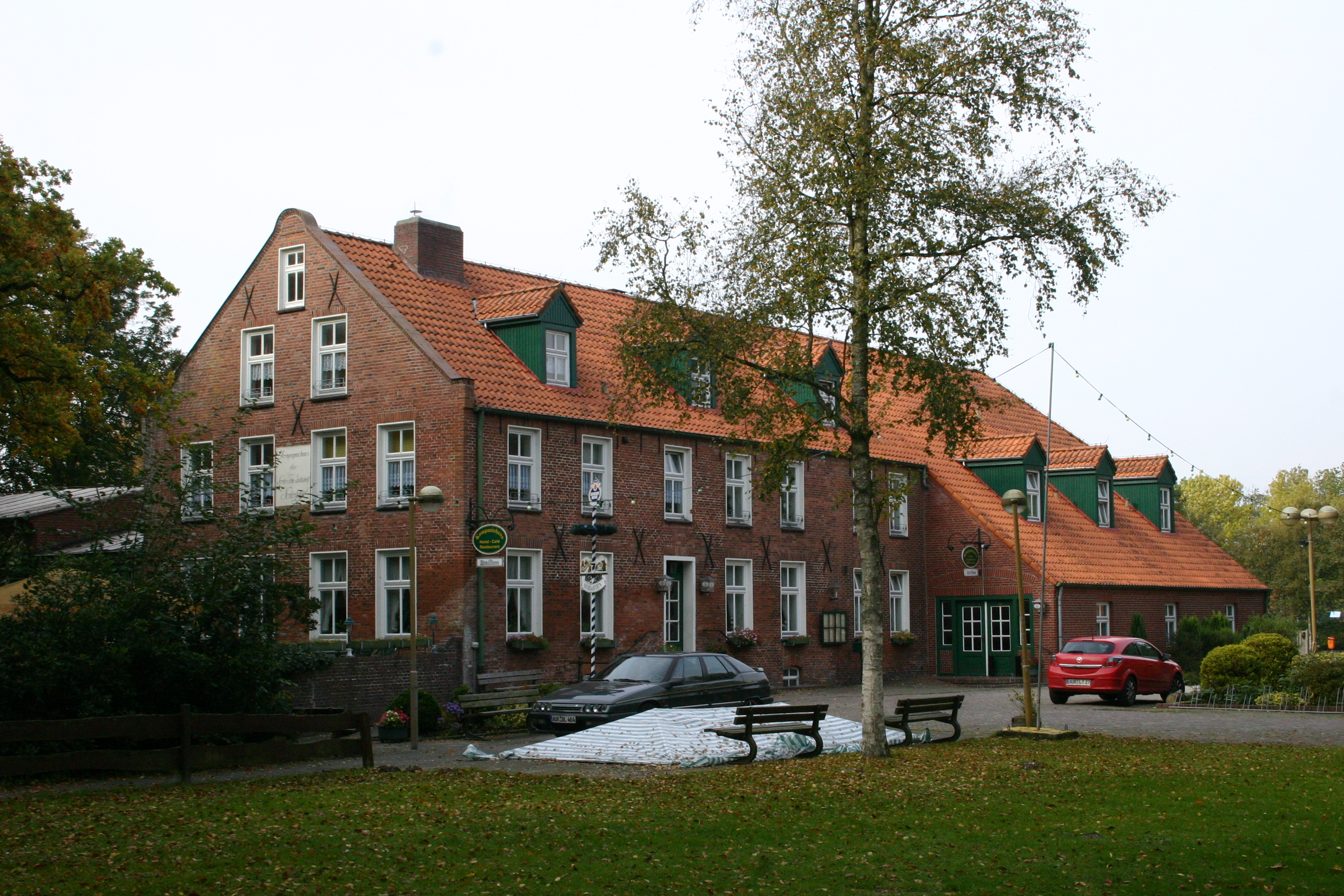
- Peat company building in Berumerfehn

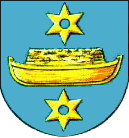
- Coat of arms
- Interactive map of Berumerfehn
- Location within Germany Location within Lower Saxony
- Coordinates: 53.56025°N 7.34341°E
- Country: Germany
- State: Lower Saxony
- District: Aurich
- Municipality: Großheide

Area
  - Total: 21.99 km^{2} (8.49 sq mi)
- Elevation: 4 m (13 ft)

Population
  - Total: 1,772
  - Density: 80.58/km^{2} (208.7/sq mi)
- Time zone: UTC+01:00 (CET)
  - Summer (DST): UTC+02:00 (CEST)
- Postal codes: 26532
- Dialling codes: 0 49 36
- Vehicle registration: AUR

Berumerfehn is part of the municipality Großheide in the district of Aurich, in Lower Saxony, Germany.

== History ==
=== Early years ===
Berumerfehn was founded in 1794 by the Fehnkompanie of Norden. The Fehnkompanie was a peat digging company of people from Norden and Hage.

By this time the village was named Norderfehn, because it was the only settlement founded inside the peat (Lower German: fehn) by of people from Norden.

Later the name of the village changed to Berumerfehn because of the close distance to Berum

=== 20th century ===
In 1972 Berumerfehn got incorporated into the municipality of Großheide.

=== 21st century ===
On August 16, 2021, an F2 T5 tornado hit Berumerfehn and damaged about 50 houses.

Historical population
Year	Pop.	±%
1821	256	—
1939	1,278	+399.2%
1946	1634	—
1961	1533	—
1970	1,810	—
2020	1,772	−2.1%
population before 2020 includes Westermoordorf.
