= Westerbur =

- Village of Dornum
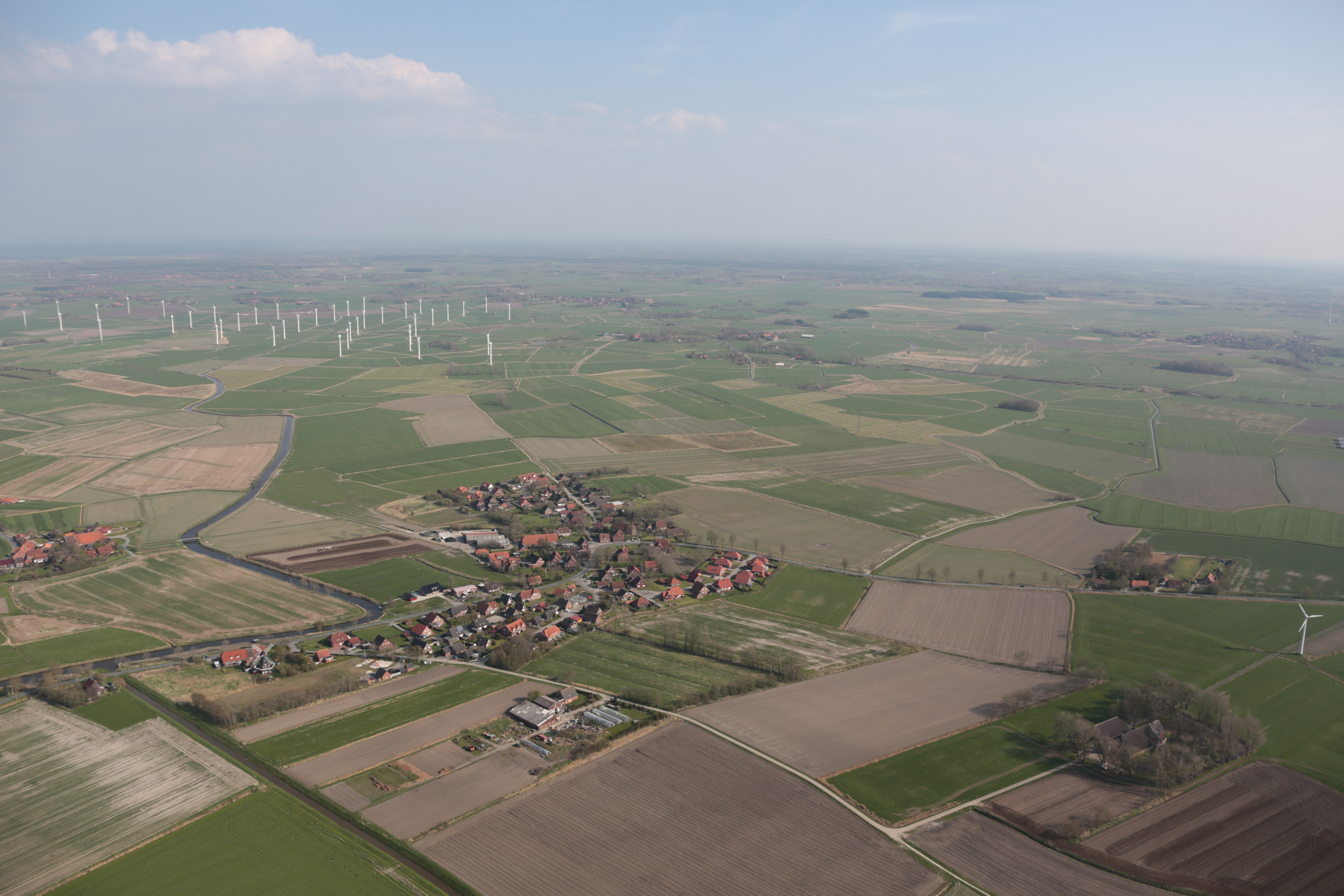
- Aerial view of Westerbur

- Coat of arms
- Interactive map of Westerbur
- Location within Germany Location within Lower Saxony
- Coordinates: 53.65822°N 7.49461°E
- Country: Germany
- State: Lower Saxony
- District: Aurich
- Municipality: Dornum

Area
  - Metro: 9.7 km^{2} (3.7 sq mi)
- Elevation: 3 m (9.8 ft)

Population
  - Metro: 254
- Time zone: UTC+01:00 (CET)
  - Summer (DST): UTC+02:00 (CEST)
- Dialling codes: 04933
- Vehicle registration: 26553

Westerbur is an East Frisian village in Lower Saxony, Germany. It is an Ortsteil of the municipality of Dornum, in the district of Aurich. Administratively, the settlement of Middelsbur, located slightly to the northeast, belongs to Westerbur.

== Geography ==
Westerbur is about one and a half kilometers south of the Wadden Sea coast. The main town of the municipality, Dornum, is about three kilometers away in a west-southwest direction. The neighboring village of Dornumersiel is two kilometers northwest.

== History ==
The place was possibly first mentioned as Westerbure in the 8th/9th century. In 1530 the settlement was officially registered as Westerbuhr. The current spelling has been documented since 1589. The name was composed of its western direction and -bur and therefore means "western farming community".

On 1 July 1972, Westerbur was incorporated into the municipality of Dornumersiel. On 1 November 2001, it became part of the municipality of Dornum.

== Gallery ==
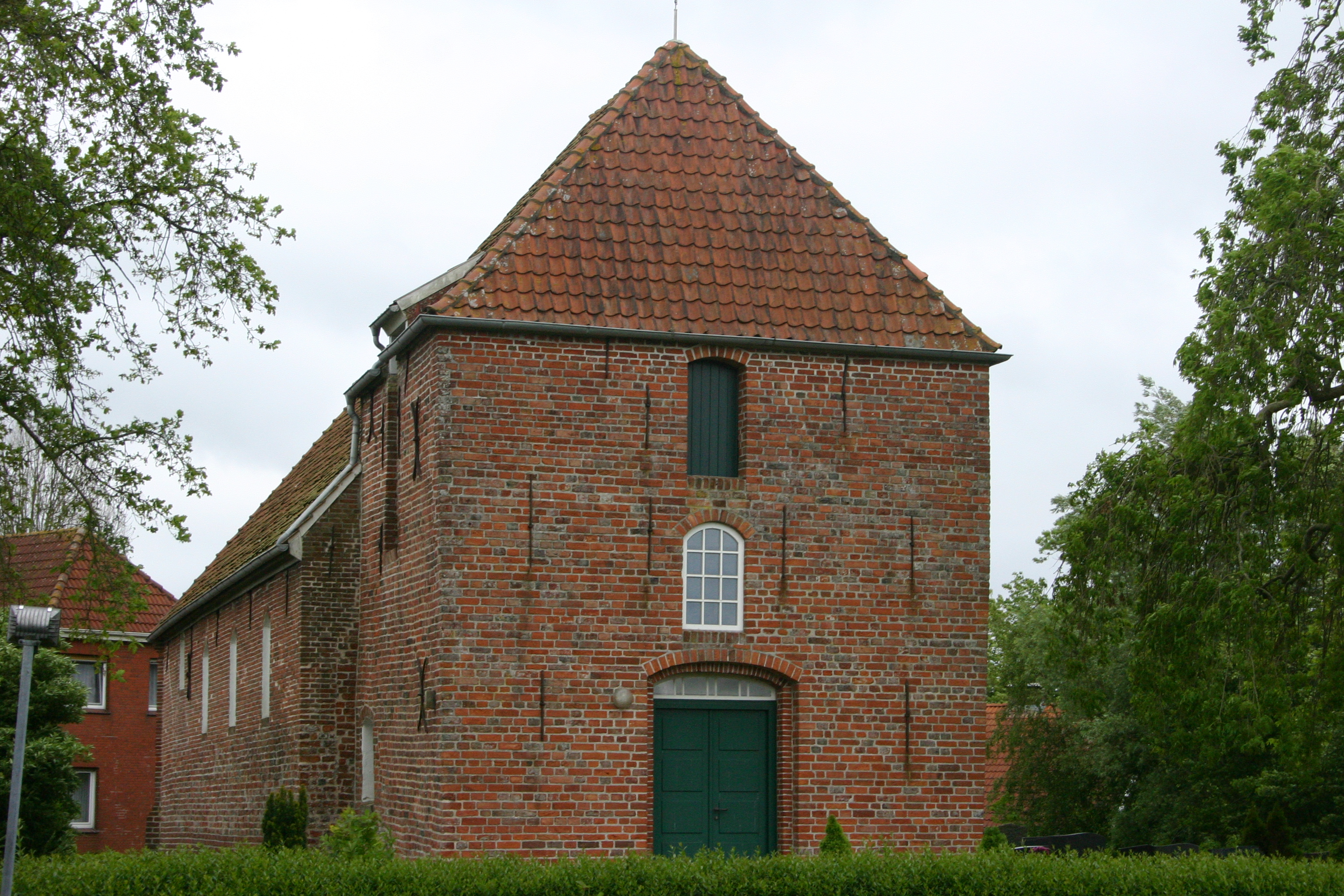
Westerbur Church

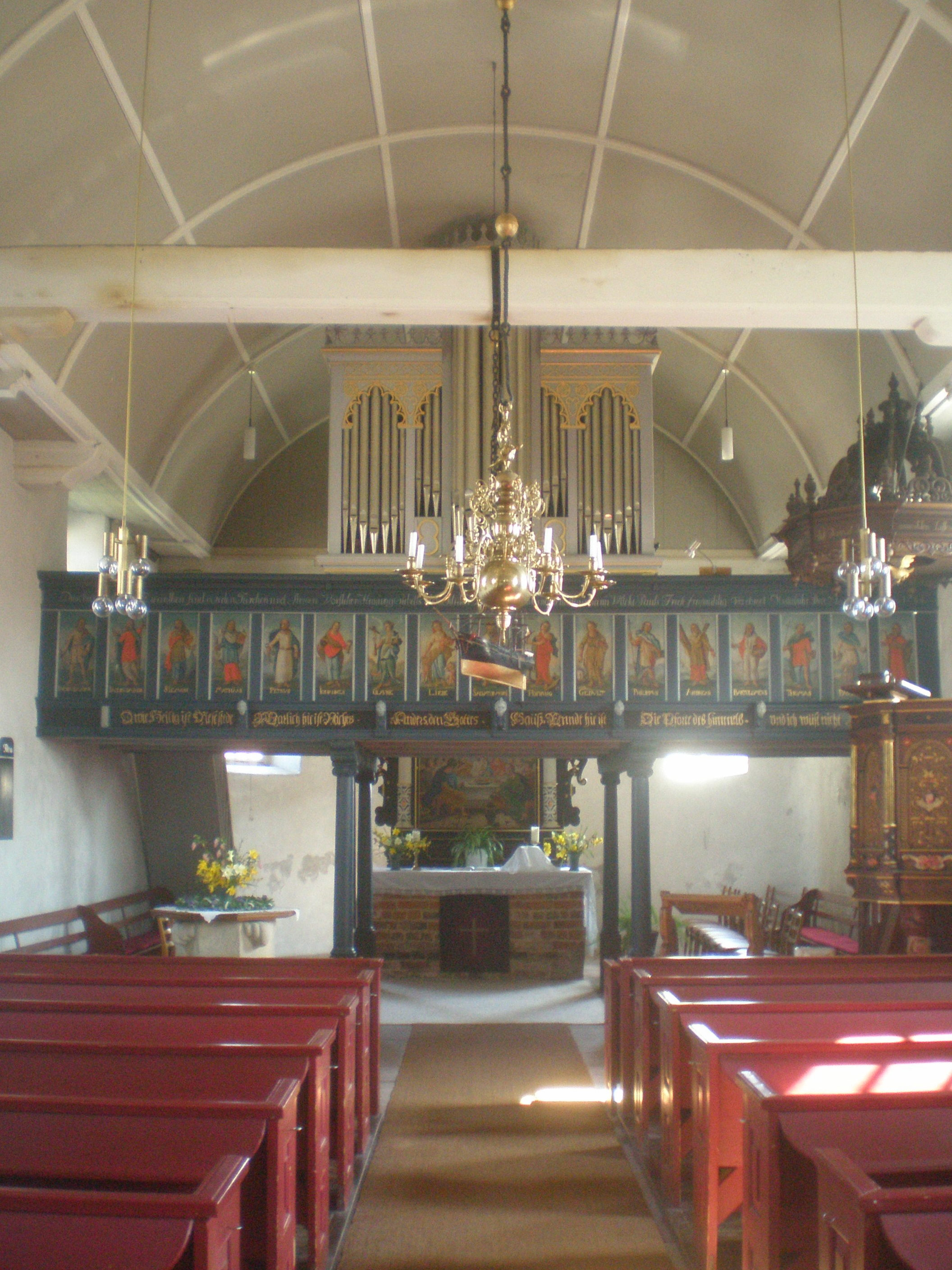
Interior of the church
