= Brookmerland =

Samtgemeinde in Germany

- Samtgemeinde
- Location of Brookmerland within Aurich district
- Interactive map of Brookmerland
- Location within Germany Location within Lower Saxony
- Coordinates: 53°31′N 7°16′E
- Country: Germany
- State: Lower Saxony
- District: Aurich
- Seat: Marienhafe
- Subdivisions: 6 municipalities

Area
  - Total: 77.3 km^{2} (29.8 sq mi)

Population (2025-12-31)
  - Total: 12,785
  - Density: 165/km^{2} (428/sq mi)
- Time zone: UTC+01:00 (CET)
  - Summer (DST): UTC+02:00 (CEST)
- Website: www.marienhafe.de

Brookmerland is a Samtgemeinde ("collective municipality") in the district of Aurich, in Lower Saxony, Germany. It is situated southeast of Norden. Its seat is in the village Marienhafe.

The Samtgemeinde Brookmerland consists of the following municipalities:

1. Leezdorf
2. Marienhafe
3. Osteel
4. Rechtsupweg
5. Upgant-Schott
6. Wirdum
