= Großheide =

- Municipality
- Flag Coat of arms

- Location of Großheide within Aurich district
- Interactive map of Großheide
- Location within Germany Location within Lower Saxony
- Coordinates: 53°35′N 7°21′E
- Country: Germany
- State: Lower Saxony
- District: Aurich
- Subdivisions: 10 districts

Government
  - Mayor (2021–26): Fredy Fischer (Ind.)

Area
  - Total: 69.32 km^{2} (26.76 sq mi)
- Elevation: 3–4 m (9.8–13.1 ft)

Population (2025-12-31)
  - Total: 8,332
  - Density: 120.2/km^{2} (311.3/sq mi)
- Time zone: UTC+01:00 (CET)
  - Summer (DST): UTC+02:00 (CEST)
- Postal codes: 26532
- Dialling codes: 0 49 36
- Vehicle registration: AUR
- Website: www.grossheide.de

Großheide (East Frisian: Grootheid) is a village and a municipality in the district of Aurich, in Lower Saxony, Germany. It is situated approximately 10 km east of Norden, and 15 km northwest of Aurich.

== Community structure ==
The municipality Großheide consists of 10 districts and incorporated villages:

- Arle
- Berumerfehn
- Coldinne
- Großheide
- Menstede
- Ostermoordorf
- Südarle
- Südcoldinne
- Westerende
- Westermoordorf
