= Arle, Großheide =

Arle
- Village of Großheide
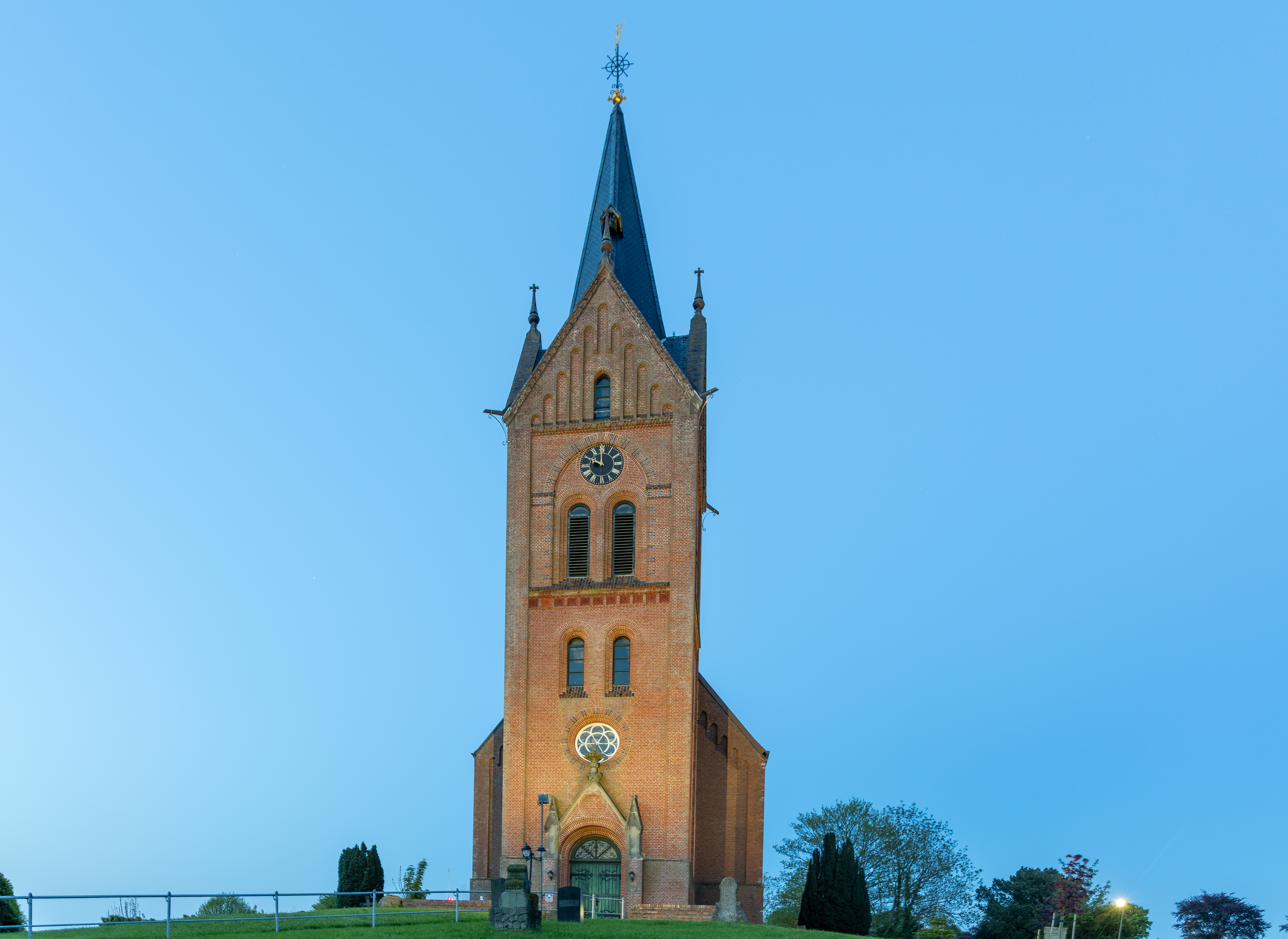
- St. Boniface Church

- Coat of arms
- Interactive map of Arle
- Location within Germany Location within Lower Saxony
- Coordinates: 53.60857°N 7.39140°E
- Country: Germany
- State: Lower Saxony
- District: Aurich
- Municipality: Großheide

Area
  - Metro: 12.28 km^{2} (4.74 sq mi)
- Elevation: 2 m (6.6 ft)

Population
  - Metro: 1,100
- Time zone: UTC+01:00 (CET)
  - Summer (DST): UTC+02:00 (CEST)
- Dialling codes: 04936
- Vehicle registration: 26532

Arle is an East Frisian village in Lower Saxony, Germany. It is an Ortsteil of the municipality of Großheide, in the Aurich district. The formerly independent municipality was incorporated into Großheide with the municipal reform law of 1 July 1972.

== History ==
Arle, located on the edge of a geest, was already a provostship under the archbishopric of Bremen in the 12th century, although under the name Erle. Unlike the neighboring Münster area, its provosts were not rich noblemen, but incumbent clergymen. The St. Boniface Church was built from tuff on a high mound at this time.

A tower in Arle was mentioned in 1408, among the castles that were taken by the Hamburgers with the support of Keno tom Brok. The castle later belonged to Hebe, the daughter of Lütet Attena, and her son Keno. Through his daughter Sophie, the castle came to the Howerda family in 1545, who became the sole owners of Arle. In 1613, Focko Beninga acquired Dreesche – a hamlet near Arle, probably by purchase. However, ownership changed in 1717 to the Barons of Wedel and in 1786 to the House of Innhausen and Knyphausen of Lütetsburg. The small shield in the coat of arms is that of the Beninga of Grimersum.
