= Marienhafe =

- Municipality
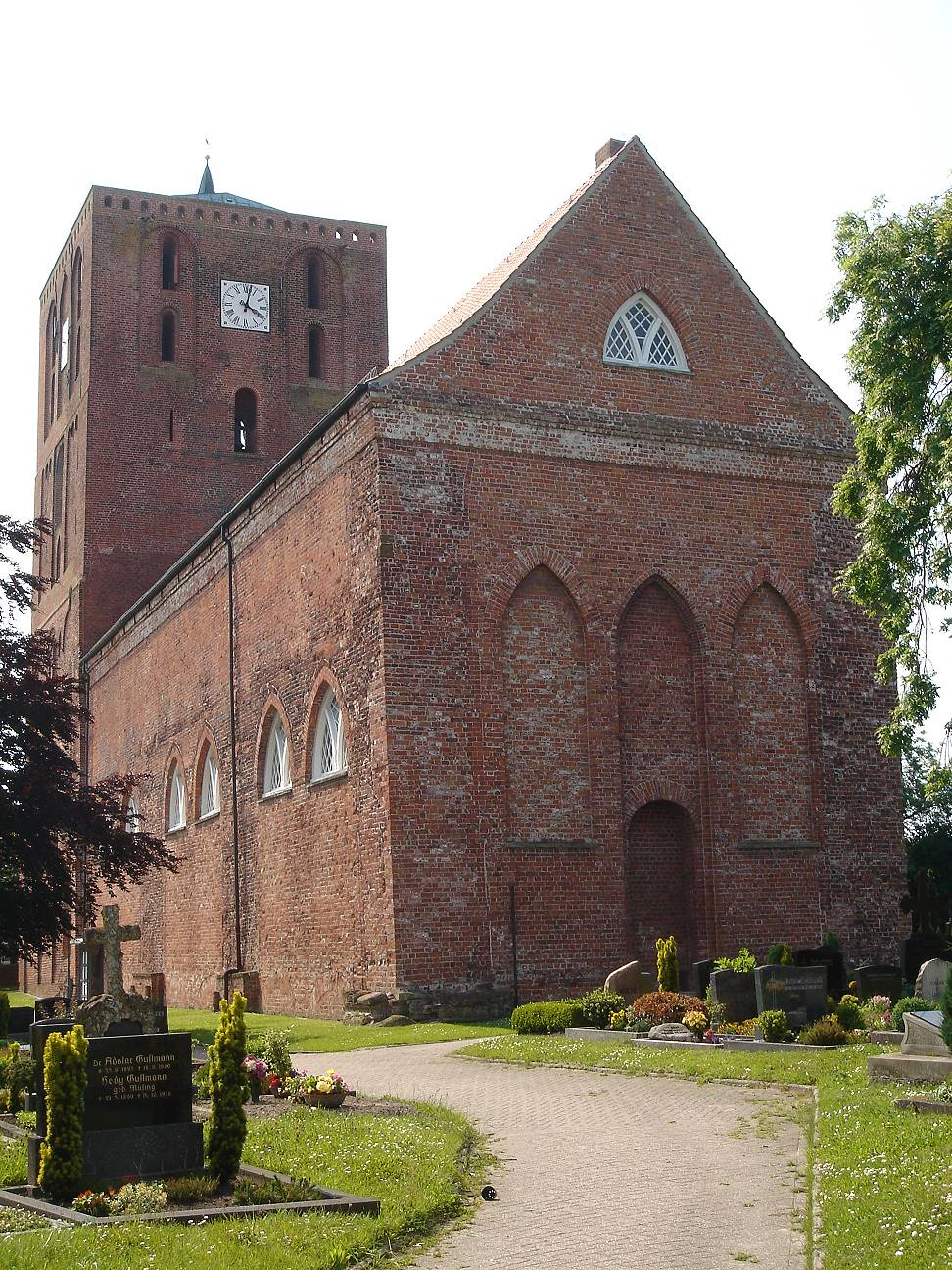
- Saint Mary's Church

- Flag Coat of arms

- Location of Marienhafe within Aurich district
- Interactive map of Marienhafe
- Location within Germany Location within Lower Saxony
- Coordinates: 53°31′23″N 7°16′25″E
- Country: Germany
- State: Lower Saxony
- District: Aurich
- Municipal assoc.: Brookmerland

Government
  - Mayor: Beate Kappher-Gruß (SPD)

Area
  - Total: 4.06 km^{2} (1.57 sq mi)
- Elevation: 0 m (0 ft)

Population (2025-12-31)
  - Total: 2,464
  - Density: 607/km^{2} (1,570/sq mi)
- Time zone: UTC+01:00 (CET)
  - Summer (DST): UTC+02:00 (CEST)
- Postal codes: 26529
- Dialling codes: 04934
- Vehicle registration: AUR

Marienhafe is a municipality in the district of Aurich, in Lower Saxony, Germany.

== Geography ==
Marienhafe lies in the western part of the East Frisian peninsula, approximately 20 kilometers northeast of Emden and 10 kilometers southeast of Norden. It borders the municipality of Osteel to the northwest, Leezdorf to the northeast, Rechtsupweg to the east, Upgant-Schott to the south, and Wirdum to the southwest.

The Abelitz River rises near Marienhafe, flowing into the Alte Greetsieler Sieltief canal and connecting the town to the East Frisian waterway network. The village of Tjüche, located north of the town center, also belongs to the municipality.
