= Aurich (district) =

District in Lower Saxony, Germany

Coordinates: 53°30′N 7°20′E

- District
- Flag Coat of arms

- Country: Germany
- State: Lower Saxony
- Capital: Aurich

Government
  - District admin.: Olaf Meinen

Area
  - Total: 1,287 km^{2} (497 sq mi)

Population (31 December 2024)
  - Total: 188,816
  - Density: 146.7/km^{2} (380.0/sq mi)
- Time zone: UTC+01:00 (CET)
  - Summer (DST): UTC+02:00 (CEST)
- Vehicle registration: AUR, NOR
- Website: www.landkreis-aurich.de

Aurich is a district (Landkreis) in Lower Saxony, Germany. It is bounded by (from the north and clockwise) the North Sea, the districts of Wittmund and Leer, and the city of Emden.

== History ==
The history of the district is linked with the history of the region of East Frisia.

The district was established in 1977 by merging the former districts of Aurich and Norden.

== Geography ==
The district is located in the westernmost part of East Frisia (Ostfriesland). In the west there is the mouth of the river Ems and the Krummhörn peninsula protruding into the estuary. With a population of approximately 190,000 (as of 31 December 2016) it is the biggest district of East Frisia.

The district includes the three populated islands of Juist, Norderney and Baltrum, which belong to the East Frisian Islands. The small island of Memmert south of Juist is a nature reserve housing rare birds. Part of the district belongs to the Lower Saxony Wadden Sea National Park.

Islands: Norderney 26 km^{2}, pop. 6100; Juist 16 km^{2}, pop. 1800; Baltrum 6.5 km^{2}, pop. 500; Memmert 5.2 km^{2}, pop. 0.

== Coats of arms ==
The coat of arms, granted in 1978, displays the so-called virgin eagle (or harpy), which was the heraldic animal of the Cirksena family, a local clan providing East Frisian chieftains during the Middle Ages. The acorns in the arms are symbols of the city of Aurich and the six-pointed spurs are symbols of Norden. The blazon is: "party per pale Azure and Gules, a harpy gardant Argent, above shoulders two six-pointed mullets Argent, below wings two acorns inverted Argent".

The former coat of arms, granted in 1950, shows a golden oak tree, representing the Upstalsboom, a tree outside the city of Aurich under which free Frisians gathered for their yearly council meetings. Its blazon is: "Gules, an oak tree Or, on a hill Or at base".

== Cities and municipalities ==
Clickable map of municipalities in the district

Cities	Free municipalities	Samtgemeinden
1. Aurich; 2. Norden; 3. Norderney; 4. Wiesmoor	1. Baltrum; 2. Dornum; 3. Großefehn; 4. Großheide; 5. Hinte; 6. Ihlow; 7. Juist; 8. Krummhörn; 9. Südbrookmerland	1. Brookmerland; 1. Leezdorf; 2. Marienhafe^{1}; 3. Osteel; 4. Rechtsupweg; 5. Upgant-Schott; 6. Wirdum	2. Hage; 1. Berumbur; 2. Hage^{1}; 3. Hagermarsch; 4. Halbemond; 5. Lütetsburg
		^{1}seat of the Samtgemeinde
