= Bay of Sielmönken =

Former bay

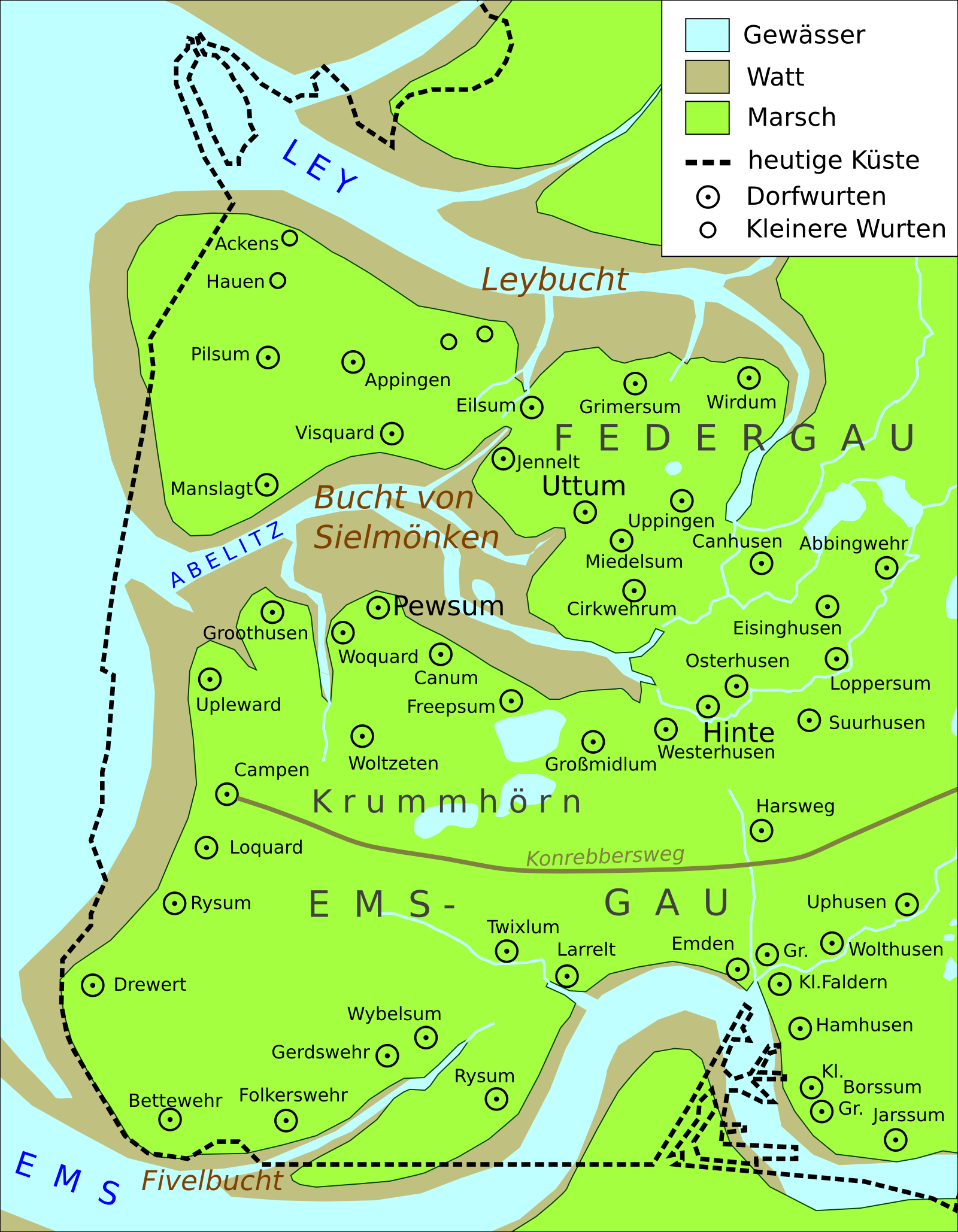
Map of the Krummhörn around 800 A. D.

The Bay of Sielmönken or Bight of Sielmönken (German: Bucht von Sielmönken or Sielmönker Bucht) is a former bay on the territory of the present day municipality of Krummhörn in the west of East Frisia in Germany. The bight reached its greatest extent during the Carolingian transgression of 800 to 950 A. D. After that it silted up heavily and was completely enclosed by dykes between 1,000 A. D. and the 13th century.

== Location ==
The Bay of Sielmönken was situated between the Dollart and the Leybucht on the terrain of the present-day municipality of Krummhörn, with a small portion on the territory of Hinte. In the Early Middle Ages it separated the historical regions of Emsgau and Federgau.

The first settlers built their houses here on warfts in the as yet undyked marshland. This enabled them to utilise the fertile marshland soils and access the sea via the bay and the creeks that reached inland. Only when the area was dyked was it possible for a settlement to be built outside the warfts. Villages on the Krummhörn like Manslagt, Visquard, Jennelt, Uttum, Cirkwehrum, Freepsum, Canum, Pewsum, Woquard and Groothusen indicate the location of the historical bay.

== Literature ==
- Hans Homeier: Der Gestaltwandel der ostfriesischen Küste im Laufe der Jahrhunderte, Selbstverlag, Pewsum, 1969
