= Woltzeten =

- Village of Krummhörn
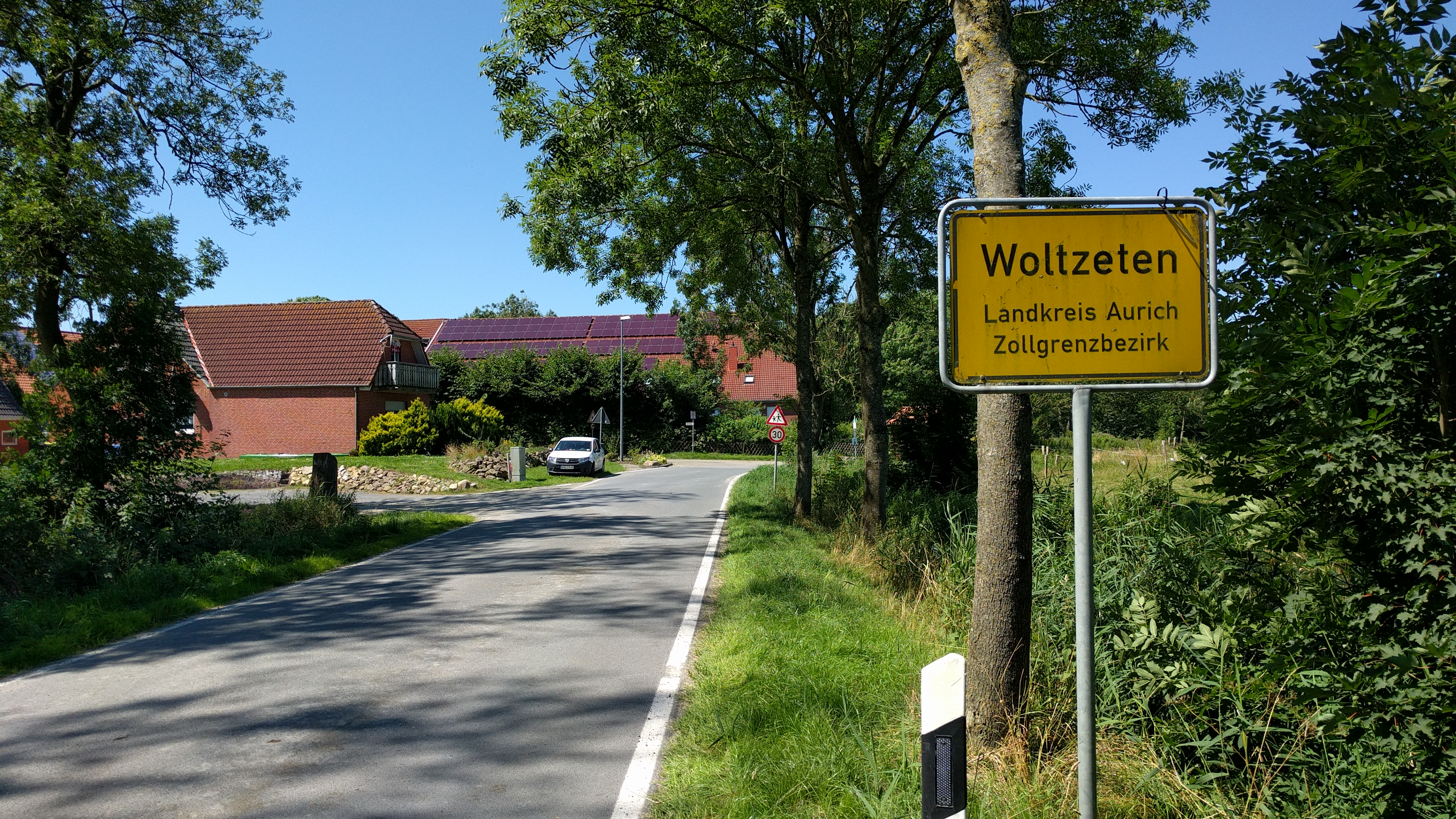
- Entrance to Woltzeten

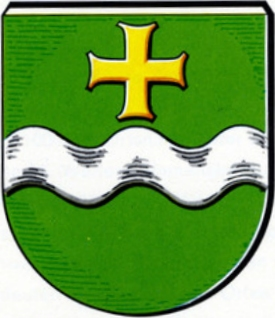
- Coat of arms
- Interactive map of Woltzeten
- Location within Germany Location within Lower Saxony
- Country: Germany
- State: Lower Saxony
- District: Aurich
- Municipality: Krummhörn

Area
  - Metro: 3.68 km^{2} (1.42 sq mi)
- Elevation: 3.5 m (11 ft)

Population
  - Metro: 184
- Time zone: UTC+01:00 (CET)
  - Summer (DST): UTC+02:00 (CEST)
- Postal codes: 26736
- Dialling codes: 04923; 04927

Woltzeten is a village in the region of East Frisia, in Lower Saxony, Germany. It is part of the municipality of Krummhörn. The village consists of two built-up areas, Woltzeten in the west and Woltzetener Vorwerk in the east.

The village is located on a warft, three kilometers south of Pewsum and about eight kilometers northwest of the city of Emden. The current Evangelical Reformed church of Woltzeten was built in 1727. Before that there was a larger church, which had to be demolished in 1725 due to dilapidation. This predecessor church probably dated from the 12th century.

A Premonstratensian monastery stood in the village from the 15th to 16th century, which probably bore the name Blauhaus, named after the color of its roof. An earlier monastery in Woltzeten was lost in a storm flood in the 13th century.

== Gallery ==
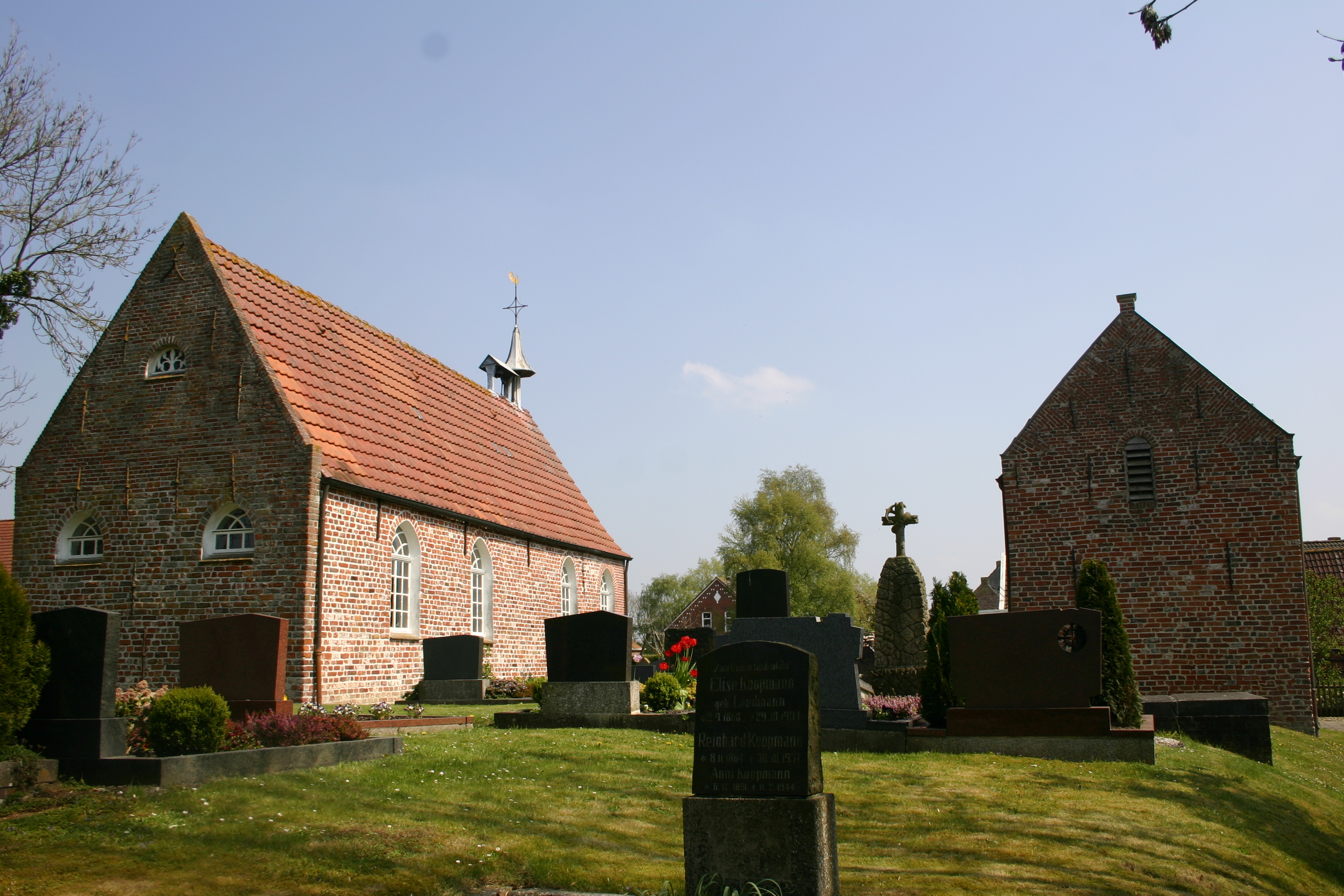
Church of Woltzeten

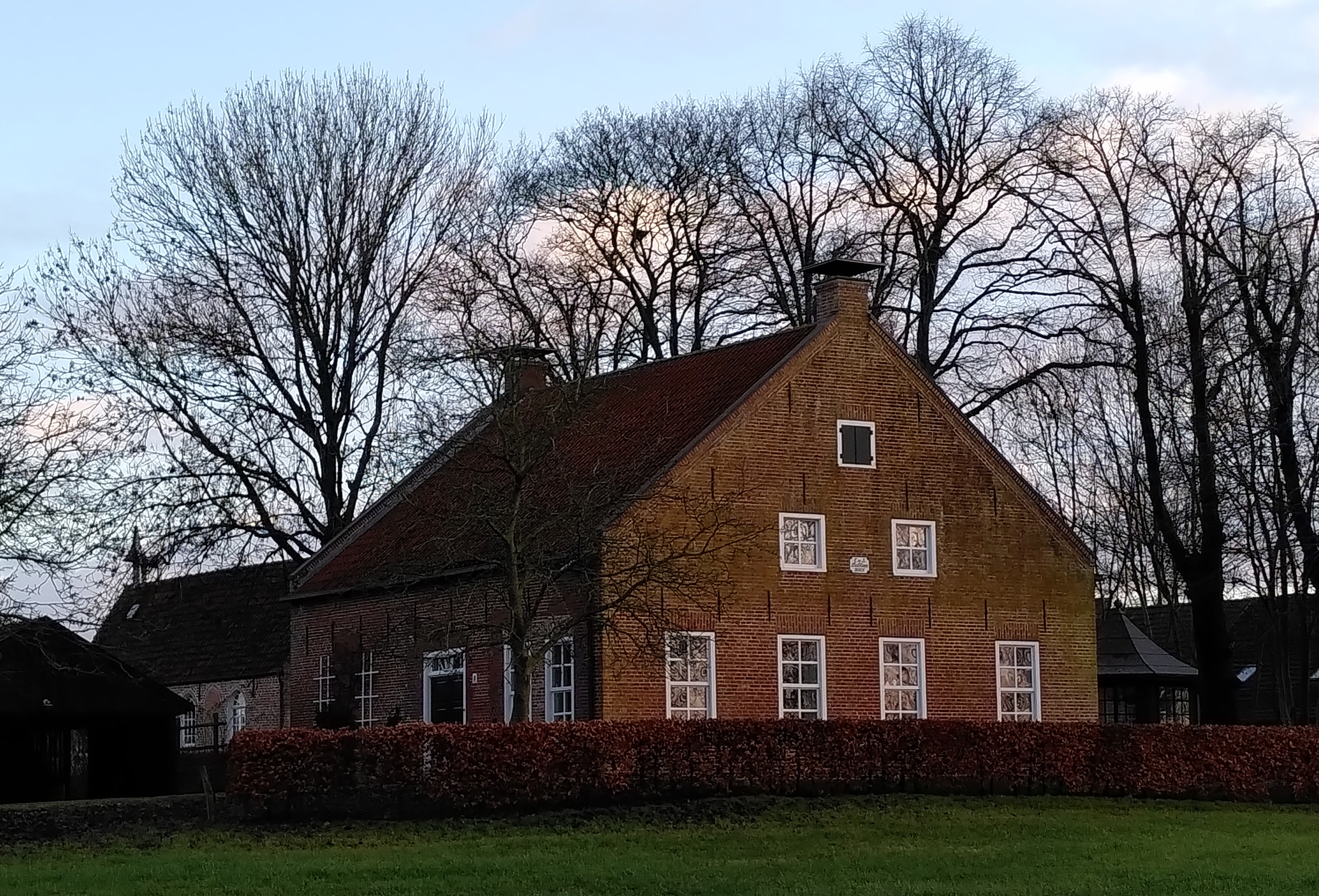
Farmhouse

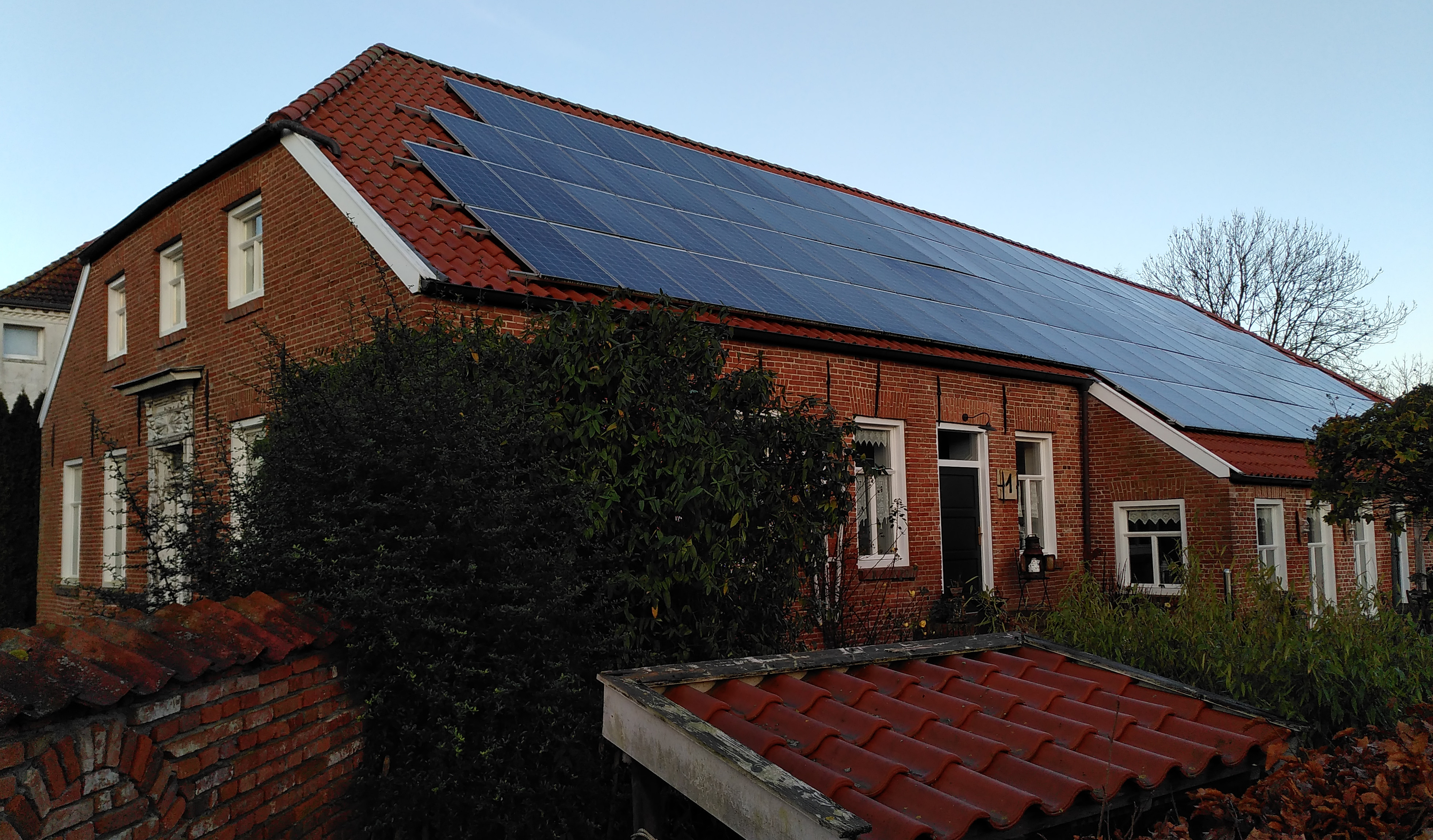
Farmhouse
