= Johannes Bogerman =

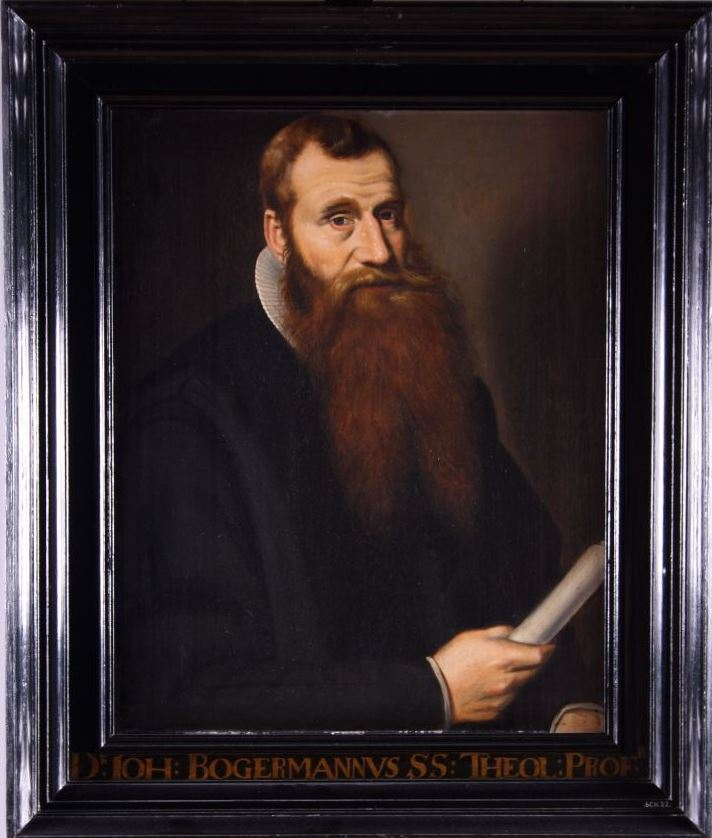
Johann Bogerman

Johannes Bogerman (1576 – 11 September 1637) was a Frisian Protestant divine.

He was born in Upleward (now Ostfriesland, Germany), the son of a preacher. From 1591 onwards, he studied in Franeker, Heidelberg, Geneva, Zürich, Lausanne, Oxford and Cambridge. In 1599, he became pastor in Sneek, 1603 in Enkhuizen and 1604 in Leeuwarden. In 1636, he became professor for theology in Franeker.

He helped translate the Bible into Dutch (the Statenbijbel) and was appointed as President of the Synod of Dort which authorized the translation and produced the Canons of Dort, otherwise known as the Five Points of Calvinism. His advisor was William Ames and, despite himself being Supralapsarian, argued at the Synod for the Canons to include the Infralapsarian position. According to Simon Kistemaker, he was a "peace-loving president, who through patience and kindness was able to control the emotional and even quarrelsome natures of the delegates."

As a Calvinist, he preached against Anabaptists, Mennonites, Jesuits and the Arminians. He died in Franeker.

== Literature ==
- BWGN I, 466 ff.
- NNBW I, 390 ff.
- Christelijke Encyclopedie I, Kampen 1956, 687 f.
- RGG I, 1345.
- H. Edema van der Tuuk: J. Bogermann, Gröningen 1868.
- Vriemoet: Series Prof. Franeker. p. 265.
- Julius August Wagenmann (1876). "Johann Bogermann". Allgemeine Deutsche Biographie (in German). Vol. 3. Leipzig: Duncker & Humblot. pp. 39–40.
- Friedrich Wilhelm Bautz (1975). "Bogermann, Johann". In Bautz, Friedrich Wilhelm (ed.). Biographisch-Bibliographisches Kirchenlexikon (BBKL) (in German). Vol. 1. Hamm: Bautz. col. 671. ISBN 3-88309-013-1.
