= Uttum =

- Village of Krummhörn
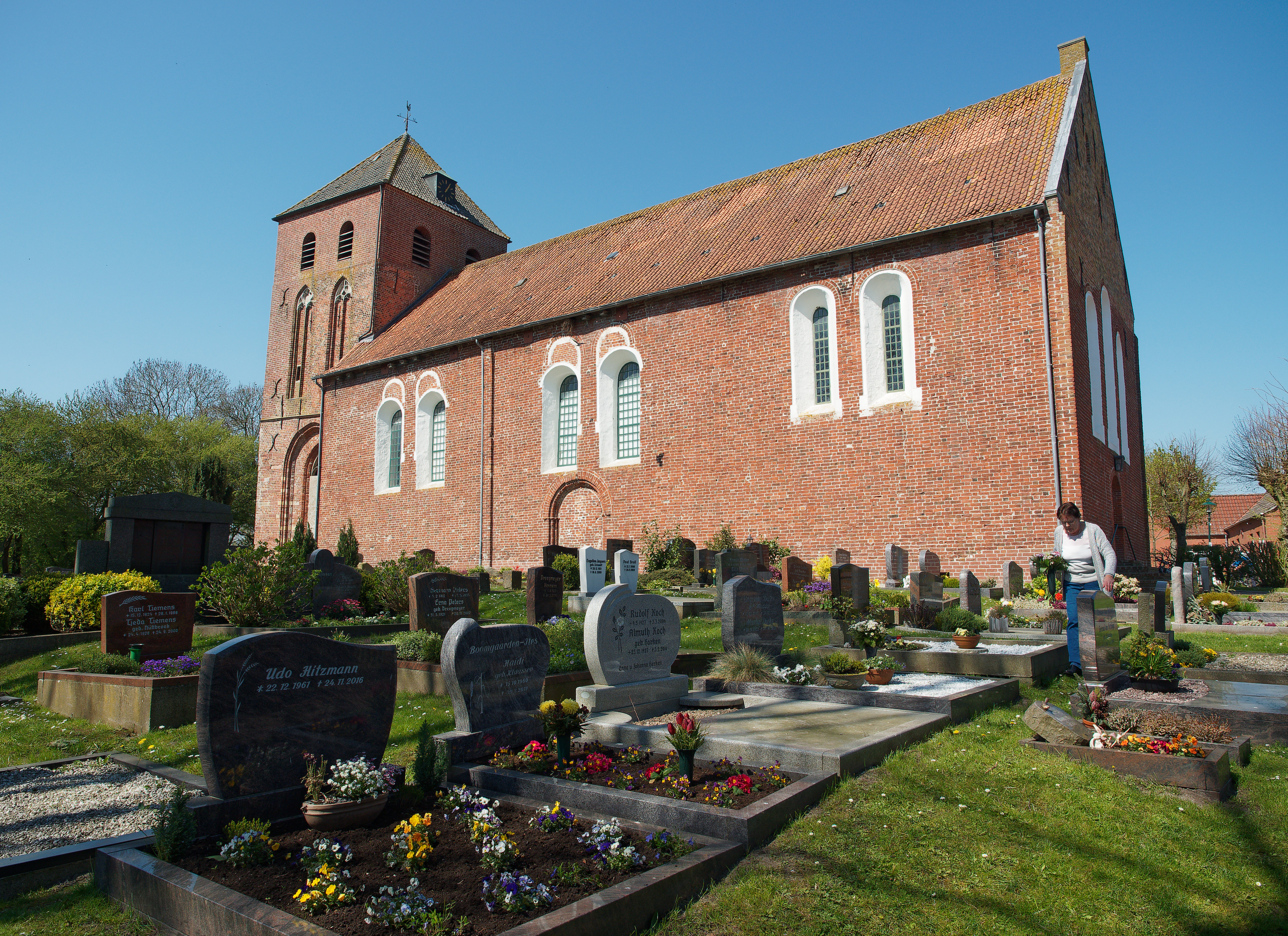
- Church of Uttum

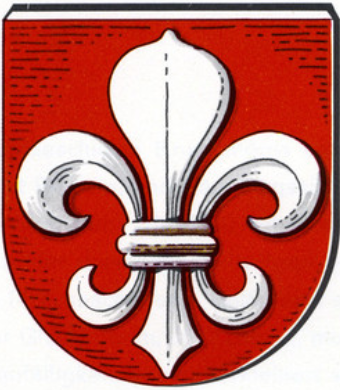
- Coat of arms
- Interactive map of Uttum
- Location within Germany Location within Lower Saxony
- Country: Germany
- State: Lower Saxony
- District: Aurich
- Municipality: Krummhörn

Area
  - Metro: 11.74 km^{2} (4.53 sq mi)
- Elevation: 0 m (0 ft)

Population
  - Metro: 494
- Time zone: UTC+01:00 (CET)
  - Summer (DST): UTC+02:00 (CEST)
- Postal codes: 26736
- Dialling codes: 04923

Uttum is a village in the region of East Frisia, in Lower Saxony, Germany. It is part of the municipality of Krummhörn. The village is located to the northeast of the village Pewsum.

Uttum used to be a seat of East Frisian chieftains, seated at Uttum Castle. The meaning of the village's name is presumably home of Otte or Utte. The Evangelical Reformed Church of Uttum dates from the 13th century and is home to an organ that was made around 1655.

== Gallery ==
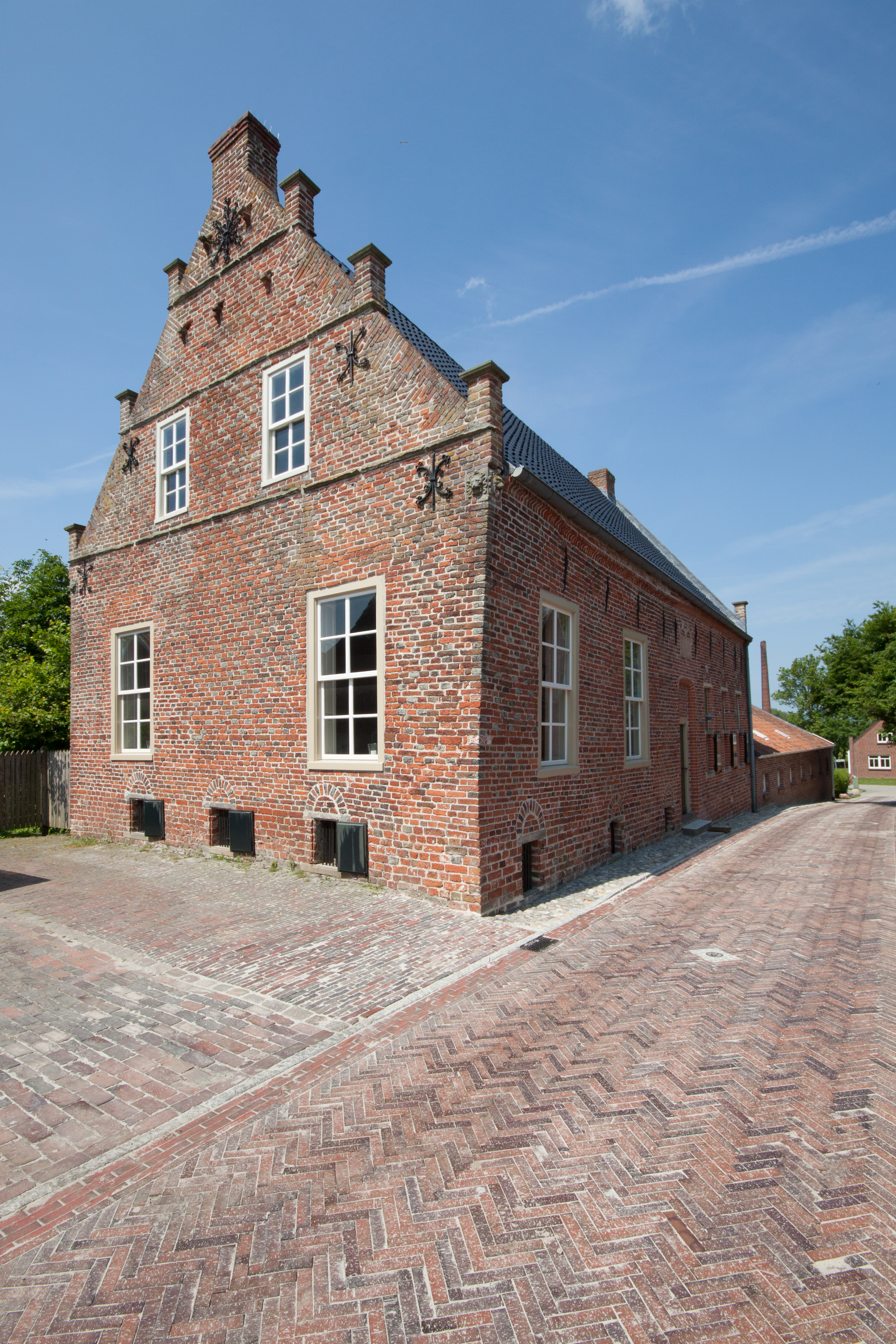
Rentmaster's house

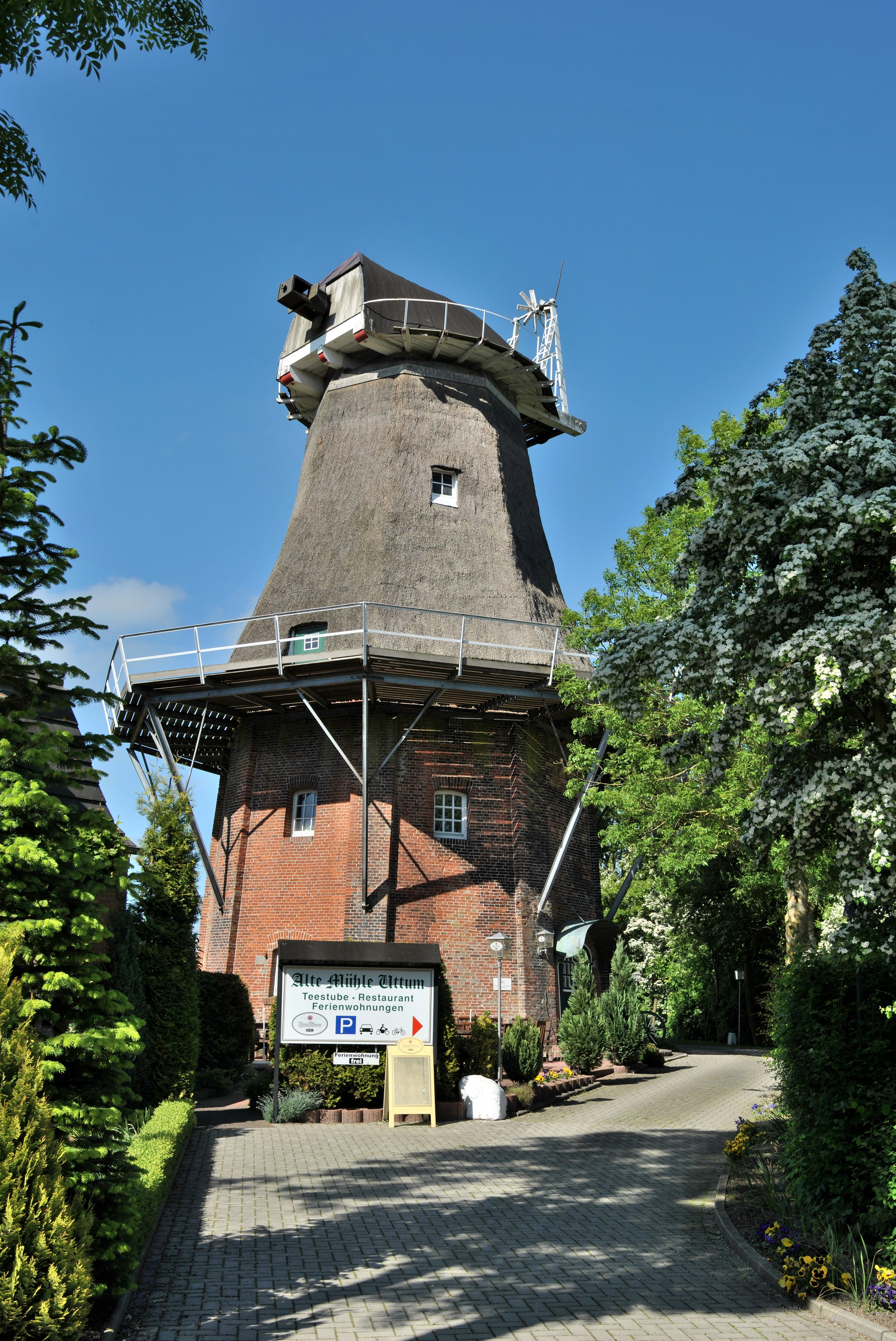
Windmill

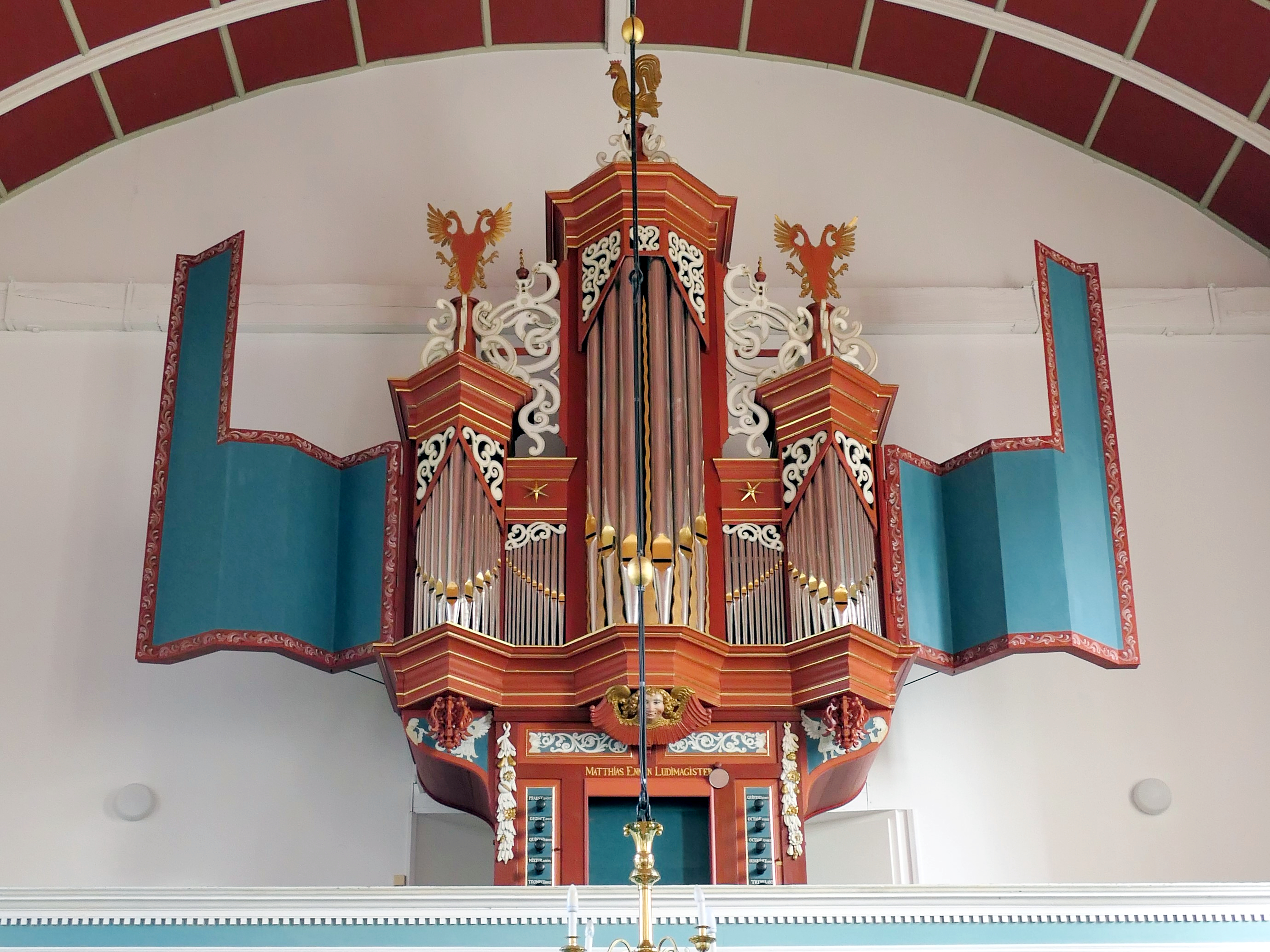
Organ of the Church in Uttum
