= Loquard =

- Village of Krummhörn
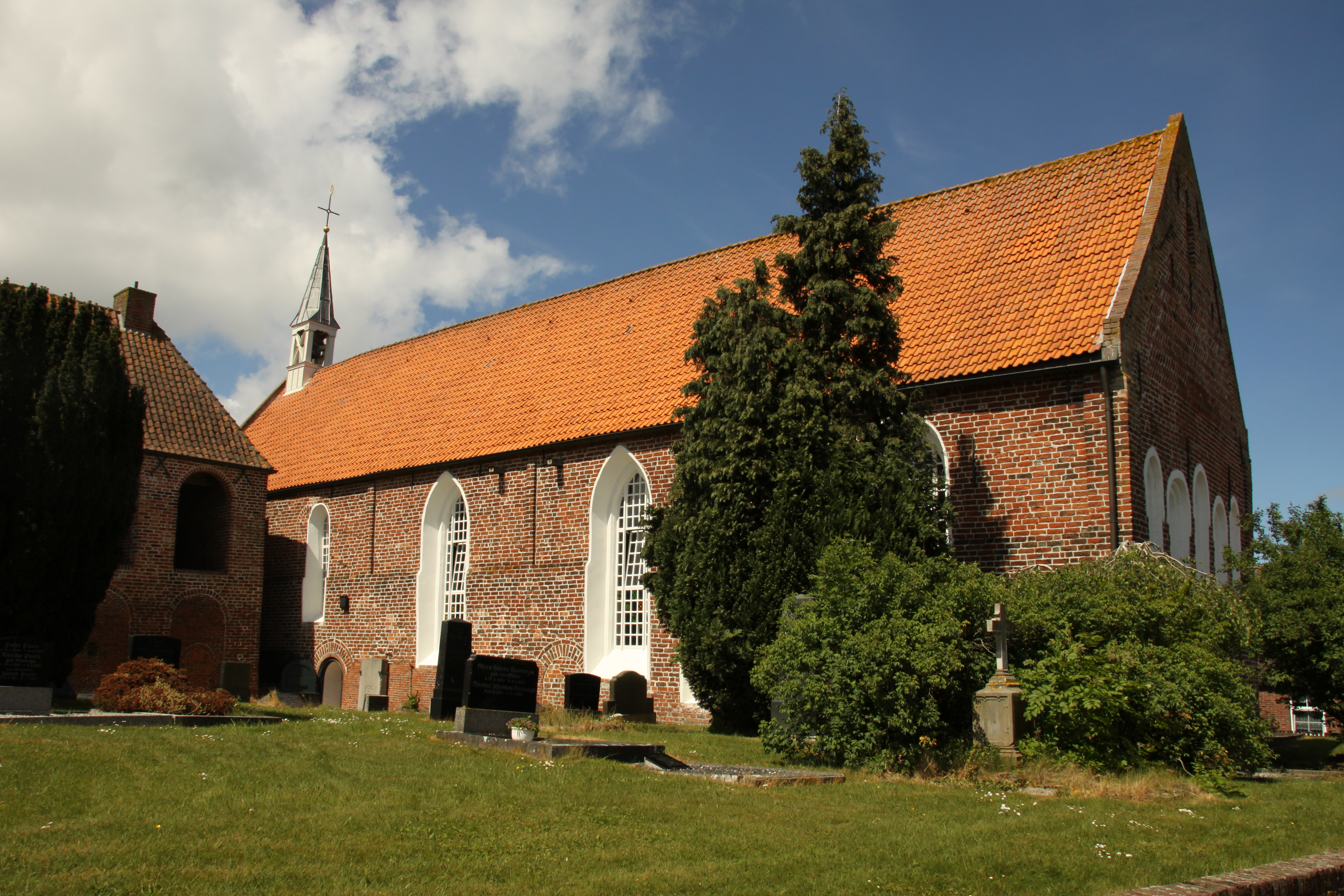
- Church of Loquard

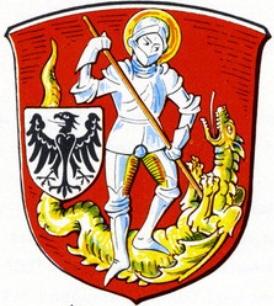
- Coat of arms
- Interactive map of Loquard
- Location within Germany Location within Lower Saxony
- Country: Germany
- State: Lower Saxony
- District: Aurich
- Municipality: Krummhörn

Area
  - Metro: 10.17 km^{2} (3.93 sq mi)
- Elevation: 4 m (13 ft)

Population
  - Metro: 614
- Time zone: UTC+01:00 (CET)
  - Summer (DST): UTC+02:00 (CEST)
- Postal codes: 26736
- Dialling codes: 04927

Loquard is an old village in the region of East Frisia, in Lower Saxony, Germany. It is part of the municipality of Krummhörn. It is a traditionally Lutheran village.

The village, built on a warft, was first mentioned in the 10th century, although archaeological findings suggest the place might already have been inhabited in the 8th or 9th century. The Evangelical Lutheran Church of Loquard, built on the warft, dates from the 13th century.

== Gallery ==
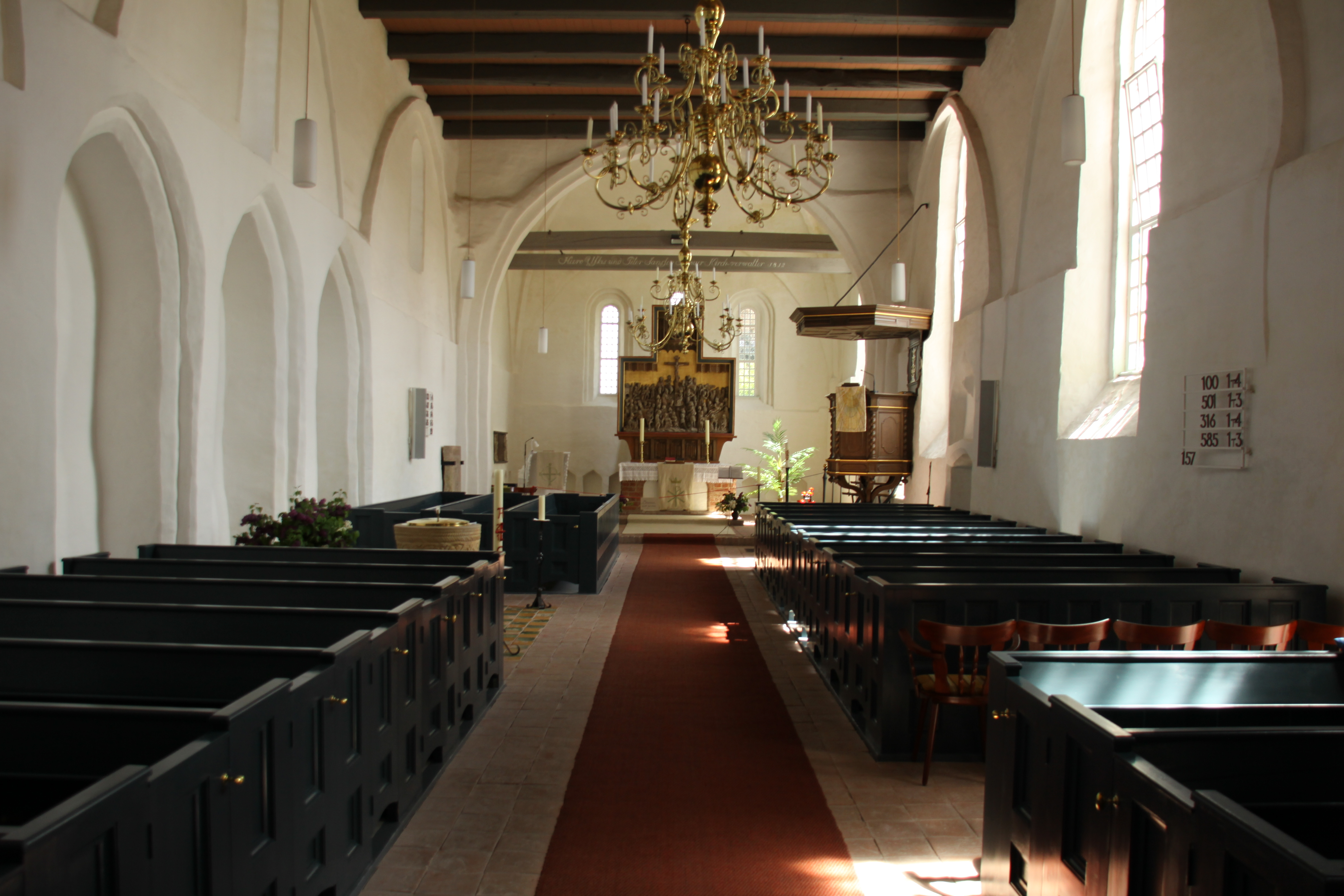
Interior of the church

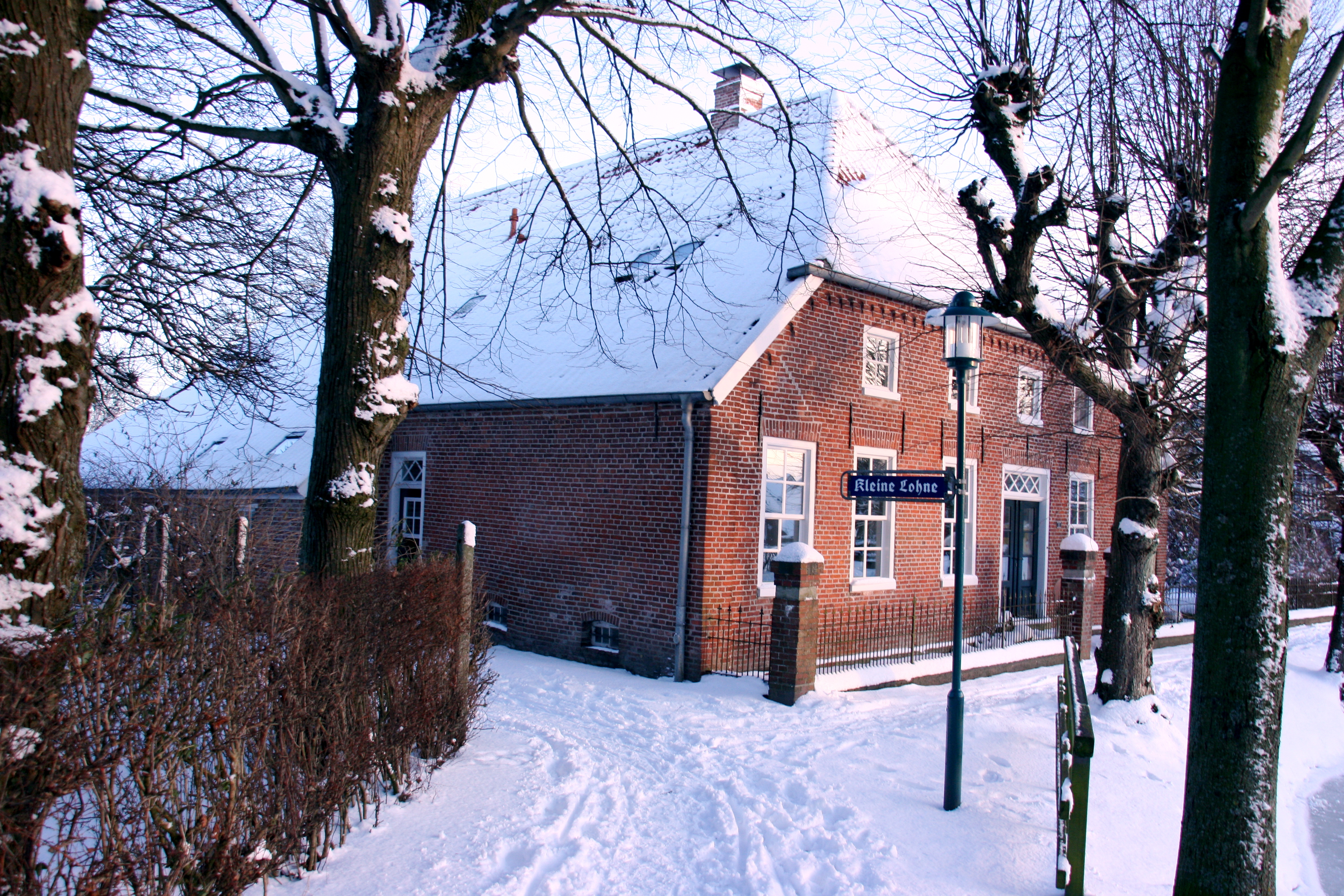
Village center

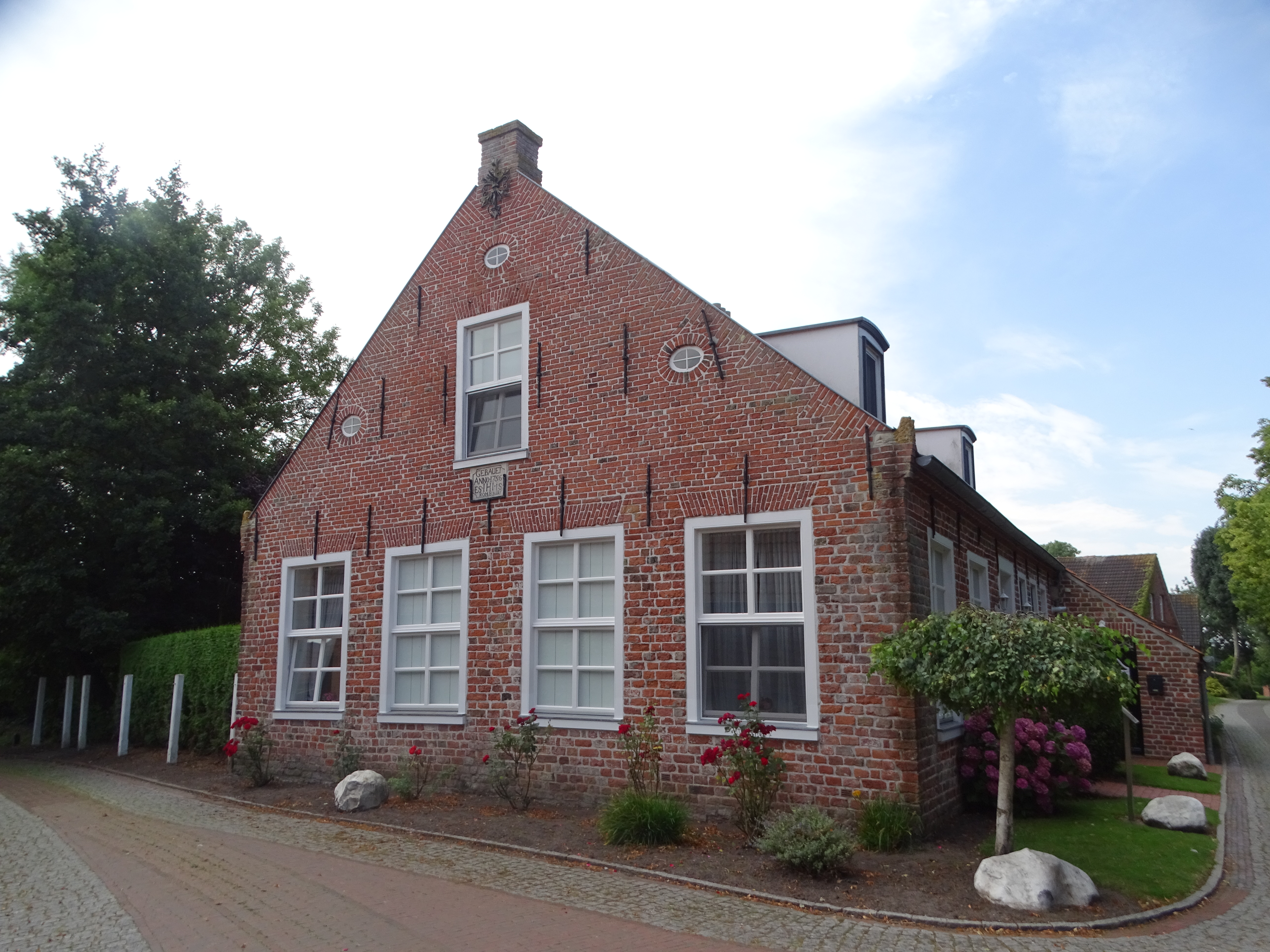
Presbytery
