= Canum =

- Village of Krummhörn
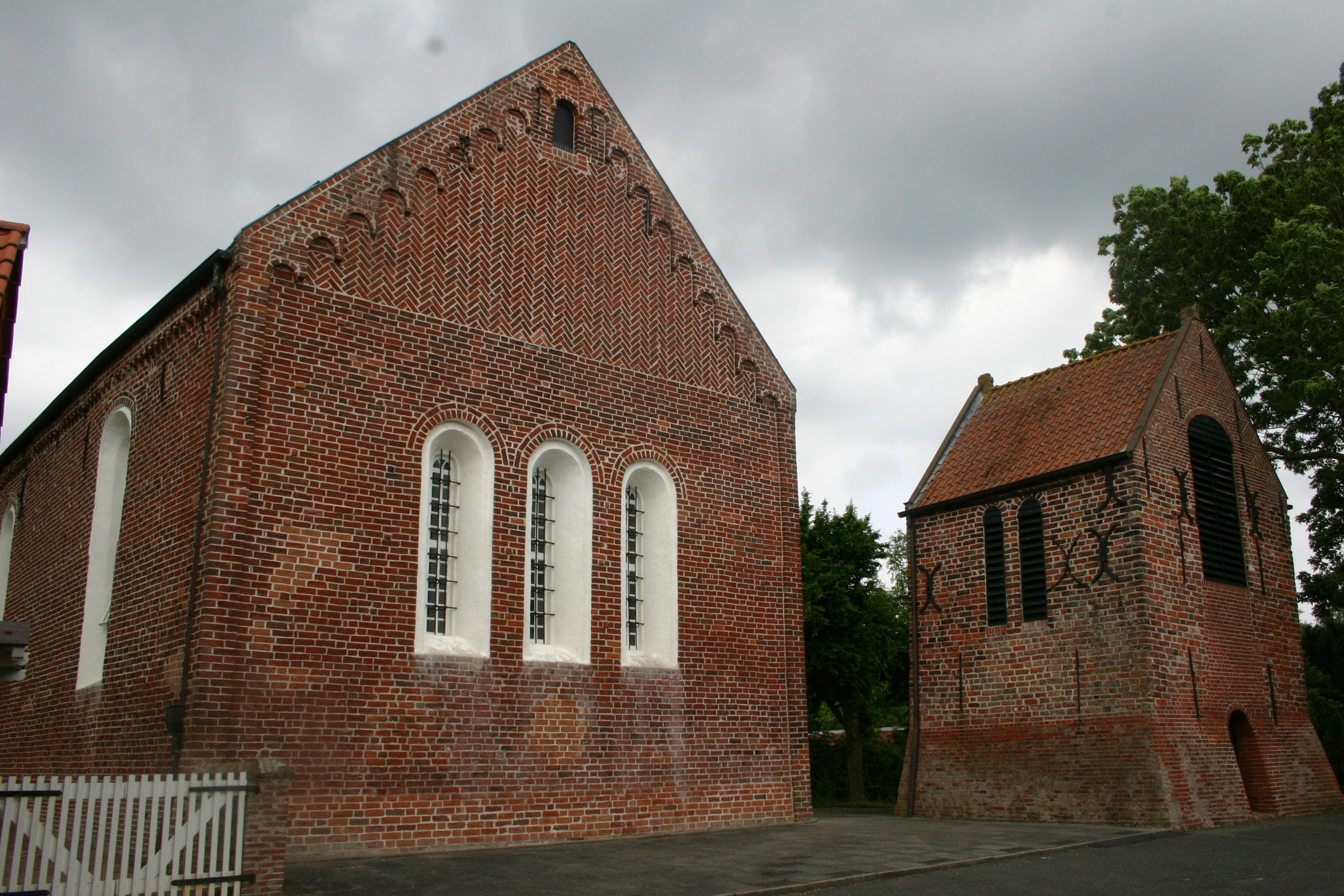
- Church of Canum

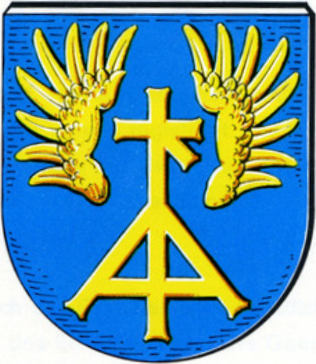
- Coat of arms
- Interactive map of Canum
- Location within Germany Location within Lower Saxony
- Country: Germany
- State: Lower Saxony
- District: Aurich
- Municipality: Krummhörn

Area
  - Metro: 3.68 km^{2} (1.42 sq mi)
- Elevation: 5 m (16 ft)

Population
  - Metro: 287
- Time zone: UTC+01:00 (CET)
  - Summer (DST): UTC+02:00 (CEST)
- Postal codes: 26736
- Dialling codes: 04923

Canum is a village in the region of East Frisia, in Lower Saxony, Germany. It is part of the municipality of Krummhörn. The village is located just to the east of the village of Pewsum.

Canum is built on a warft. It is already mentioned in 950 as Caninghem. The village church was built in the middle of the warft in the 13th century.
