= Woquard =

- Village of Krummhörn
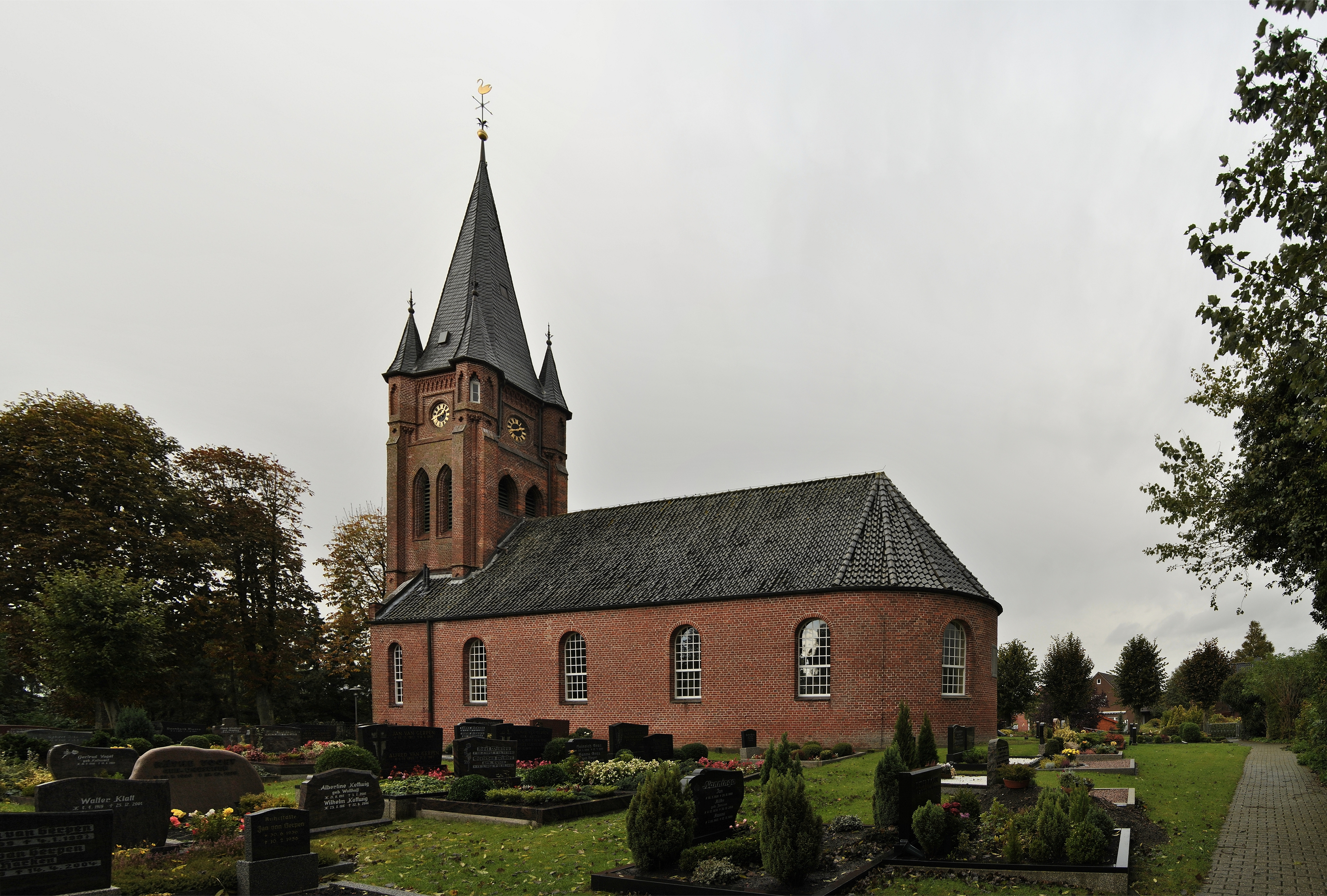
- St. Mary's Church

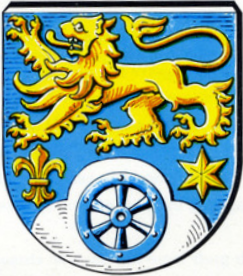
- Coat of arms
- Interactive map of Woquard
- Location within Germany Location within Lower Saxony
- Country: Germany
- State: Lower Saxony
- District: Aurich
- Municipality: Krummhörn

Area
  - Metro: 2.52 km^{2} (0.97 sq mi)
- Elevation: 4.5 m (15 ft)

Population
  - Metro: 177
- Time zone: UTC+01:00 (CET)
  - Summer (DST): UTC+02:00 (CEST)
- Postal codes: 26736
- Dialling codes: 04923
- Website: woquard.de

Woquard (East Frisian Low Saxon: Wokert) is a village in the region of East Frisia, in Lower Saxony, Germany. It is part of the municipality of Krummhörn. The village is located just to the west of Pewsum, bordering its urban area.

Woquard is the smallest village in the municipality. It is first mentioned in 1632, under the name Wachtwert. The Woquard coat of arms reflects the history of the village. The colors blue and yellow refer to the Swedish royal family and recall Catherine Vasa of Sweden. The lion refers to the chieftains' coat of arms of the Manninga family; the fleur-de-lis from the crest to the Counts Cirksena; the star can be associated with the ancient coat of arms of Norden.

The expression "Wokert is 'n Rad" ('Woquard is a wheel') refers to the streets of the village, which resemble the spokes of a wheel, with St. Mary's Church as the center. The oldest church bell in East Frisia hangs in the tower of the church, which dates from 1789. There used to be a castle on the west side of the church, but it was destroyed by a chieftain of Pewsum.
