= Krummhörn =

- Municipality
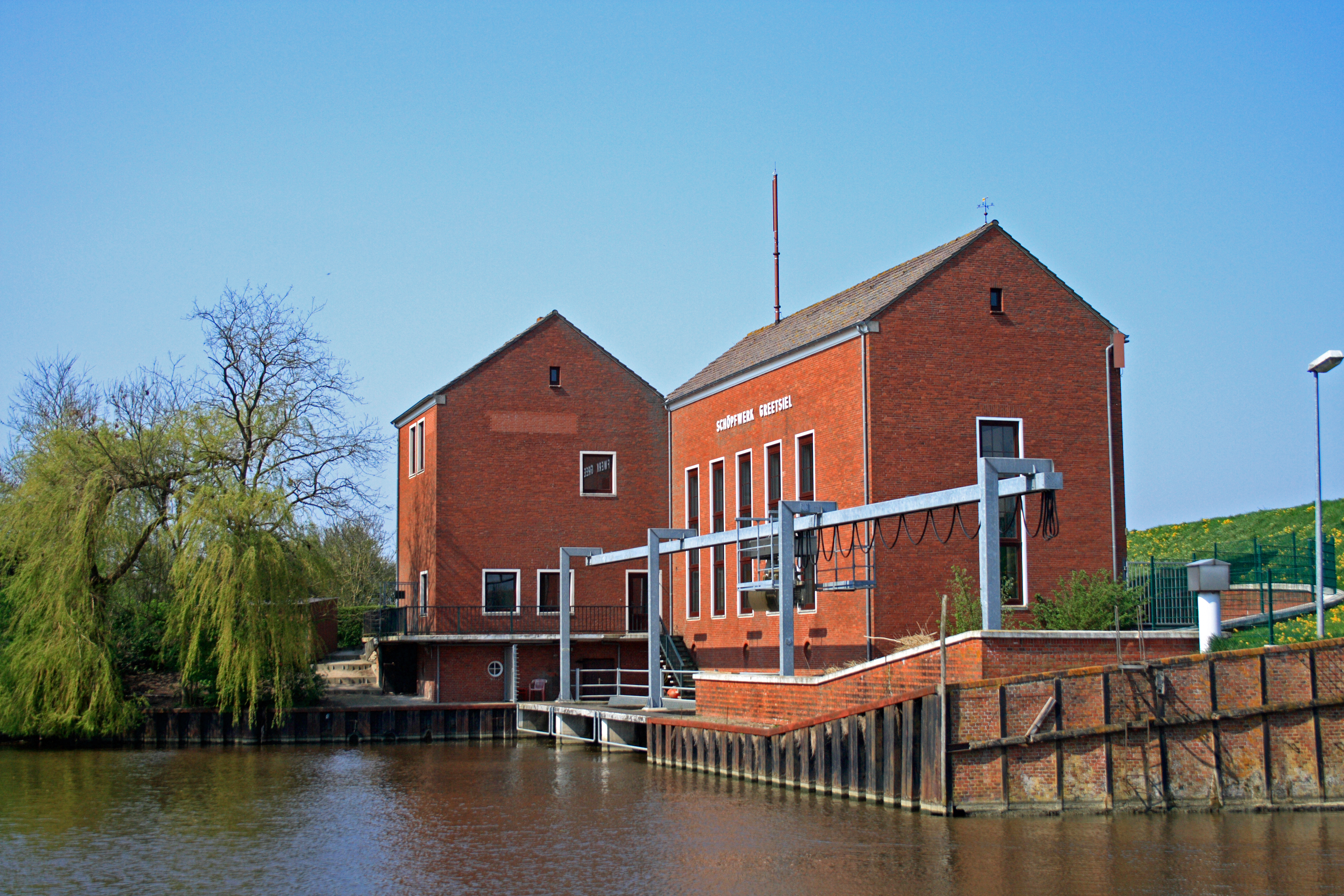
- Pumping station in Greetsiel

- Flag Coat of arms

- Location of Krummhörn within Aurich district
- Interactive map of Krummhörn
- Location within Germany Location within Lower Saxony
- Coordinates: 53°26′N 7°5′E
- Country: Germany
- State: Lower Saxony
- District: Aurich
- Subdivisions: 19 districts

Government
  - Mayor (2021–26): Hilke Looden (Ind.)

Area
  - Total: 159.2 km^{2} (61.5 sq mi)
- Elevation: 0 m (0 ft)

Population (2025-12-31)
  - Total: 11,354
  - Density: 71.32/km^{2} (184.7/sq mi)
- Time zone: UTC+01:00 (CET)
  - Summer (DST): UTC+02:00 (CEST)
- Postal codes: 26736
- Dialling codes: 04923, 04926, 04927
- Vehicle registration: AUR
- Website: www.krummhoern.de

Krummhörn is a municipality in the district of Aurich, in Lower Saxony, Germany. It is situated near the Ems estuary, approximately 15 km southwest of Norden, and 10 km northwest of Emden.

The municipality of Krummhörn comprises 19 villages (Ortsteile), and their official population as of 31 December 2008 is as follows:

- Campen (507)
- Canum (293)
- Eilsum (612)
- Freepsum (406)
- Greetsiel (1553)
- Grimersum (604)
- Groothusen (483)
- Hamswehrum (493)
- Jennelt (384)
- Loquard (621)
- Manslagt (413)
- Pewsum, main village (3289)
- Pilsum (594)
- Rysum (730)
- Upleward (405)
- Uttum (505)
- Visquard (720)
- Woltzeten (200)
- Woquard (191)

== Notable people ==
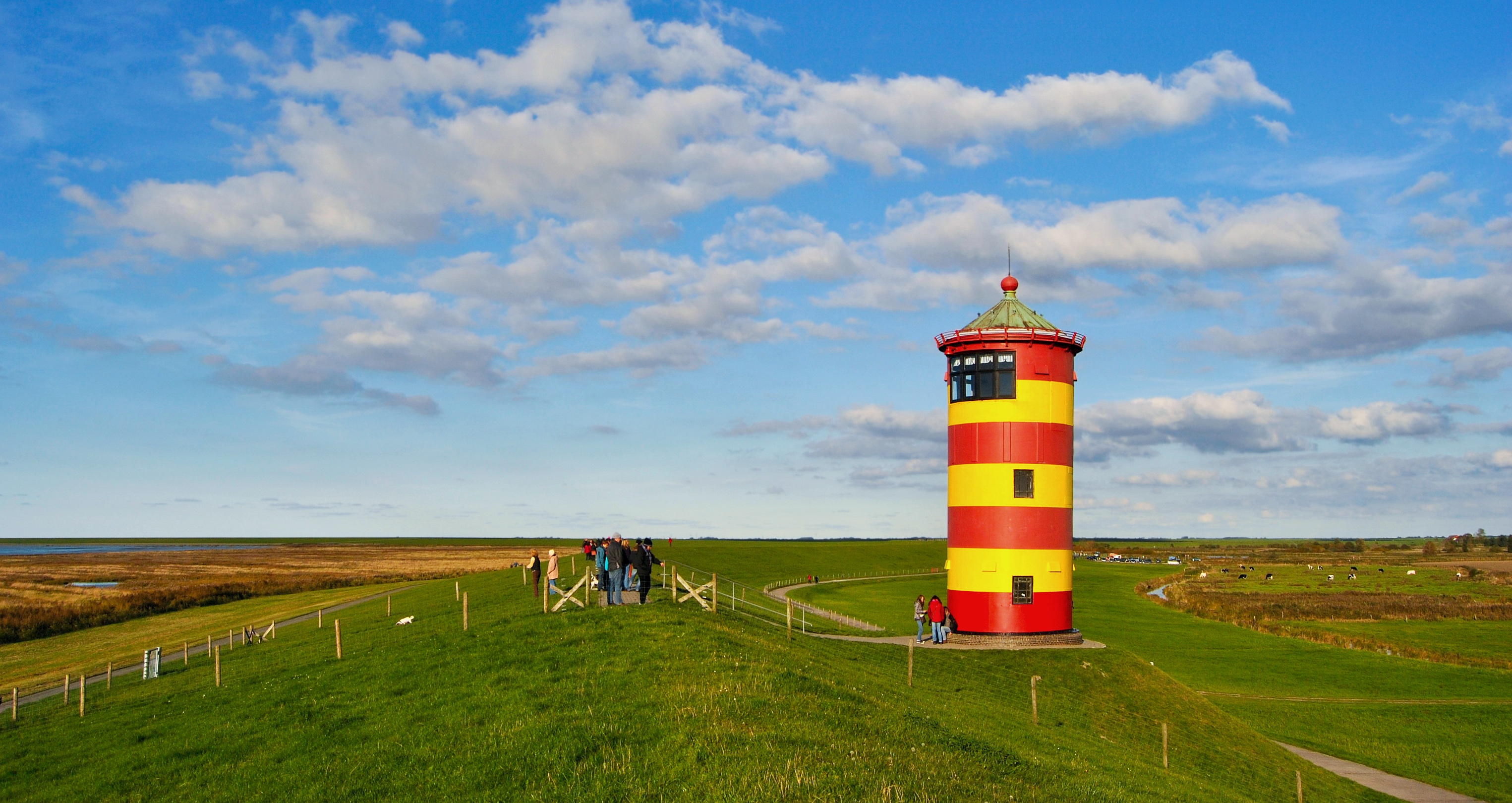
The Pilsum Lighthouse

- Eggerik Beninga (1490–1562), a chronicler of the Frisians, was born in Grimersum.
- David Folkerts-Landau (born 1949), German economist
