= David Folkerts-Landau =

German economist (born 1949)

- Born: May 21, 1949 (age 77); Upleward, West Germany

Academic background
- Education: Harvard University

Academic work
- Discipline: Economics and Mathematics
- Institutions: Deutsche Bank

David Folkerts-Landau (born May 21, 1949) is a German born economist. He became member of the Deutsche Bank Group Executive Committee in 2012 and was named chief economist of Deutsche Bank on 1 June 2012. He is based in London.

Born in Upleward, East Friesland, Folkerts-Landau attended Harvard University, earning a doctorate at Princeton University in 1978. After teaching at Chicago Business School he worked for the International Monetary Fund from 1983 to 1997 before moving on to the financial sector. He joined Deutsche Bank's London office in October 1997. He was a member of the Markets division executive committee headed by Anshu Jain, and later the investment bank executive committee. In 2012, he became a member of the Deutsche Bank Group Executive Committee, which was co-chaired by Anshu Jain and Jürgen Fitschen. At the same time, he also succeeded Thomas Mayer as Deutsche Bank's chief economist. He has kept a low public profile as chief economist and is better known as a confidant to Anshu Jain.

== Early life ==
David Folkerts-Landau was born in north-west Germany and at 14 years old was sent to a Scottish boarding school. He is reported to maintain links to his birthplace. He is the grandson of Imke Folkerts.

== Opinions and research ==
=== 1997 Asian financial crisis ===
In June 1998, Folkerts-Landau predicted that the 1997 Asian financial crisis would see its resolution "stretch well into the new century. The elimination of the unprecedented debt overhang and the reduction of high leverage ratios will be slow and painful.There is little upside potential, and a lot of downside risk coming from the possible devaluation of the Chinese RMB, a continuing slide of Japan into a 1930’s type of recession, and the possibility of a G-7 interest rate increase". South Korea and some of the other smaller Asian countries had recovered by 2000, but Malaysia and Indonesia only recovered to pre-crisis levels of output by 2001 and 2003 respectively. Of the downside risks highlighted, the prediction of a weak Japan materialised, with people coming to talk about the 1990s and 2000s as the country's "lost decades". The Chinese RMB did not depreciate but remained pegged at around 8.27-8.28 to the dollar until 2005. The Fed cut rates by 75 basis points later in the year, before reversing this decision in June 1999 and hiking rates by 175 basis point over the following 12 months.

=== Russia crisis of 1998 ===
Folkerts-Landau and Marcel Cassard predicted in June 1998 that "notwithstanding the current political crisis, the Russian economy is likely to improve in 1998. Recent indicators point towards faster growth in output and a pick-up in domestic demand as well as a decline in inflation to single digits". Within a few months, Russia dramatically devalued its currency, it defaulted on its debt and suffered inflation of 84%. This came be known as the 1998 Russian financial crisis.

=== Bretton Woods II ===
Folkerts-Landau, Dooley and Garber have referred to the monetary system of today as Bretton Woods II. They argue that in the early 2000s (decade) the international system is composed of a core issuing the dominant international currency, and a periphery. The periphery is committed to export-led growth based on the maintenance of an undervalued exchange rate. In the 1960s, the core was the United States and the periphery was Europe and Japan. This old periphery has since graduated, and the new periphery is Asia. The core remains the same, the United States. The argument is that a system of pegged currencies, in which the periphery export capital to the core that provides a financial intermediary role is both stable and desirable, although this notion is controversial.

=== 2008 financial crisis ===
Folkerts-Landau viewed the subprime mortgage crisis as the result of fraud rather than financial innovation such as CDOs. In May 2008, he argued that the international monetary system was well placed to withstand the sub-prime crisis, and that a pessimistic outcome was not credible. In February 2009, he ceded that his critics were correct in predicting the 2008 financial crisis, but the transmission mechanism was different to what most had expected. He believed that the cause of the crisis was ineffective supervision and regulation of financial markets.

=== European debt crisis ===
In June 2013, Folkerts-Landau argued that the European debt crisis was the biggest force for European integration. He stated that "legacy (bank) assets should be kept apart from any sovereign bail-out...to mix them up would be a socialisation of losses of an unimaginable scale". He believed that Germany stimulating demand and raising wages would be "disastrous for the Euro-zone viz-a-viz the rest of the world". In relation to austerity programmes introduced since the crisis, he believed that "it has been a tremendous propaganda victory of governments to make us believe that austerity has reached its limits". He further added that "While we maintain that the Euro-zone will not break up, we are less optimistic on the pace of crisis resolution. Reform efforts are likely to be slow given the challenging economic backdrop and 'austerity fatigue'. As a result, we expect a continuation of the 'muddle-through' approach to crisis resolution, with growth in Europe remaining subdued for several years". He argued that Spanish youth unemployment was not due to austerity and instead could be solved by "changing trade union laws" as they were keeping labour markets closed.

=== ECB quantitative easing ===
In December 2013, Folkerts-Landau advocated the ECB engage in "genuine quantitative easing" given that he predicted growth in the euro zone to be low "pretty much as far as the eye can see,". The view was controversial as the Germany’s central bank had earlier opposed the ECB's conditional bond purchase plan. In April 2014, he reiterated his view that "the ECB will eventually engage in further easing, starting with the likely purchase of private assets ('private QE') in H2 [2014]". In an interview with Welt Online also in April 2014, he recognised that as with other ECB programmes such as OMT (Outright Monetary Transactions), which was never used by the ECB, "The decision of the central bank to talk about QE, perhaps even ensures that you never have to use it.". The ECB announced quantitative easing in January 2015.

=== Russia and Ukraine ===
In April 2014, in the context of Russian involvement with Ukraine, Folkerts-Landau stated that "unlike many investors, I believe that Putin is ready to take these economic costs [of sanctions] in order to boost the geopolitical weight of Russia and secure the Russian influence in the region [by annexing eastern Ukraine] . This should lead to growing geopolitical uncertainty and at the end also to growing economic instability"

=== Referendum on Scottish independence ===
In September 2014 newspaper reports reported that he had criticised the economic arguments for Scottish independence.

In September 2014, Folkerts-Landau also wrote a critical analysis of the prospects of Scottish independence, saying a Yes vote would go down in history as "a political and economic mistake" which was indirectly quoted by former Labour prime minister Gordon Brown.

=== Grexit ===
In 2010 Folkerts-Landau predicted that the Euro-zone would survive the debt crisis. "We believe that the Euro-zone will survive this current crisis. (…) [T]here is no way the political and financial leadership of the core Euro-zone countries are going to sacrifice the whole single currency project over a default by Greece or Portugal".

On 19 June 2015, Folkerts-Landau predicted that in relation to Greece receiving funding from the Brussels group before the end of the month there was a "60 percent probability of no deal, [which would be] followed by capital controls". After the "No" vote at the 5 July 2015 referendum, while recognising that odds of Grexit had risen materially, Folkerts-Landau wrote: "we continue to see Greece staying in the euro as marginally more likely, not least because the majority of Greeks prefer so".

== Controversies ==
=== Testimony to German Parliamentary Commission ===
On June 27, 2012, David Folkerts-Landau spoke before a German parliamentary commission on commodity markets and food price inflation. He said that "In developing countries where often up to 90% of the income must be spent on food, price increases of wheat, corn, and soybeans in the years 2007–2008 and 2010–2011 had devastating consequences." He also stated that there was "hardly any sound empirical evidence" that it "led to price increases or higher volatility." However, in earlier research published by his team, it argued that speculation had the possibility of "distorting the normal functioning of the market," which "can have grave consequences for farmers and consumers and is in principle unacceptable.". In another research note, it argued that "in some instances speculation might have added to the [commodity] price movement"

=== Libor scandal ===
On April 23, 2015, Deutsche Bank agreed to a combined US$2.5 billion in fines – a US$2.175 billion fine by American regulators, and a €227 million penalty by British authorities – for its involvement in the Libor scandal. Folkerts-Landau was not named in any of the actions, but a fellow group executive committee member was mentioned as having been aware of issues around the fix since October 28, 2008. On June 12, 2015, a leaked Bafin report concluded that while no board member was directly involved in manipulating interest rates, the regulator found serious negligence in control of business processes, organization and dealing with the affair. It went on to criticise three additional managing board and group executive committee members.

== Personal life ==
David Folkerts-Landau is married to Maie Folkerts. In May 2013, he bought a New York apartment in the Dakota owned by the Portuguese government for $11.6 million. It was believed to be part of asset sales needed to deal with Portugal's fiscal crisis. Leveraged buyout specialist Wilbur Ross and musician Yoko Ono are noted residents of the block.
