= Freepsum =

- Village of Krummhörn
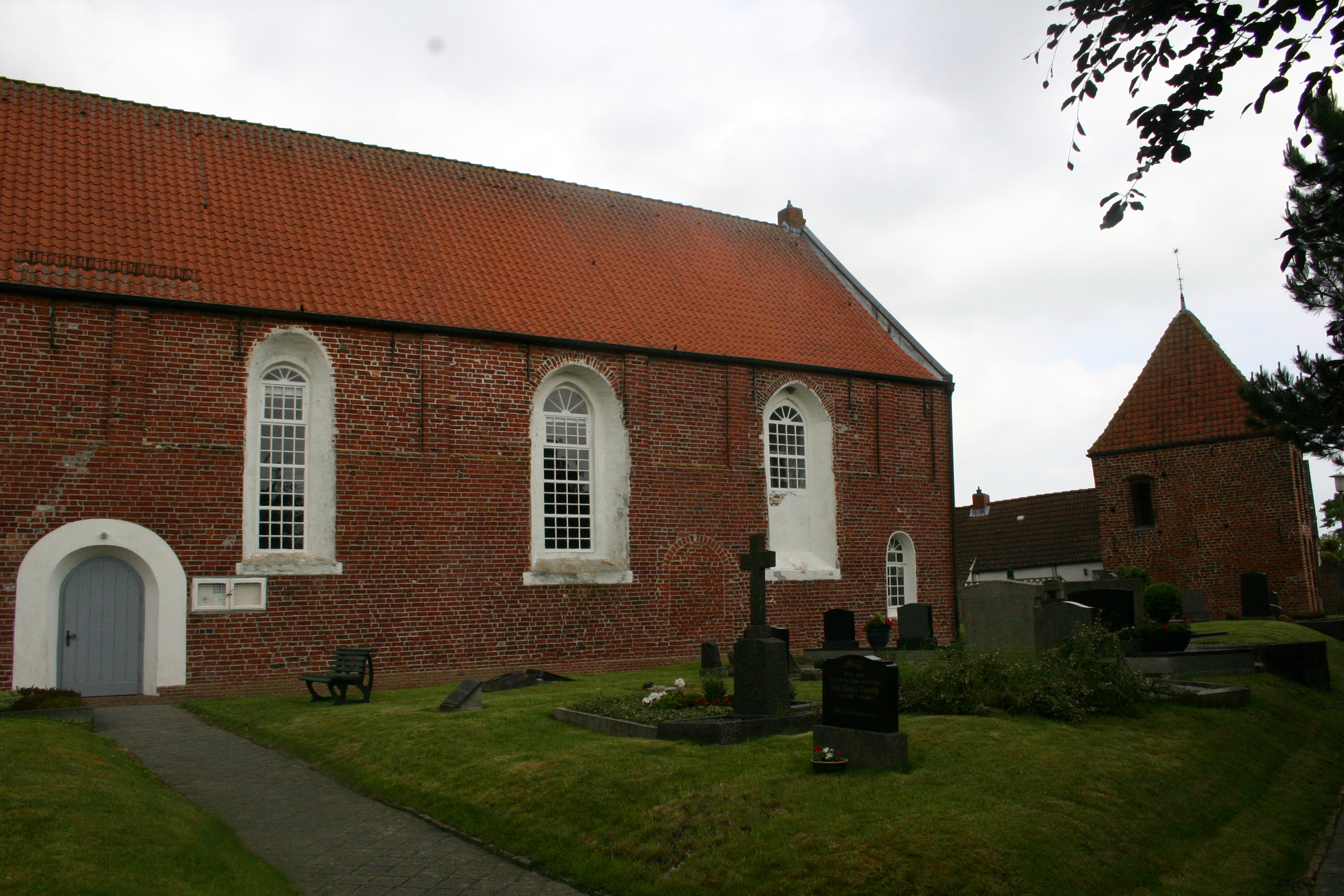
- Church of Freepsum

- Coat of arms
- Interactive map of Freepsum
- Location within Germany Location within Lower Saxony
- Coordinates: 53.41740°N 7.13579°E
- Country: Germany
- State: Lower Saxony
- District: Aurich
- Municipality: Krummhörn

Area
  - Total: 7.34 km^{2} (2.83 sq mi)
- Elevation: −3 m (−9.8 ft)

Population (2006-12-31)
  - Total: 437
  - Density: 59.5/km^{2} (154/sq mi)
- Time zone: UTC+01:00 (CET)
  - Summer (DST): UTC+02:00 (CEST)
- Postal codes: 26736
- Dialling codes: 04923

Freepsum is a village in the region of East Frisia in Lower Saxony, Germany. The village has 437 inhabitants (2006) and lies about ten kilometres northwest of the seaport of Emden. It is part of the municipality of Krummhörn

Freepsum was an independent parish until the foundation of the municipality of Krummhörn as part of the Lower Saxony municipal reforms in 1972. Today the village is one of the 19 parishes in the Krummhörn, as the municipality is colloquially called.

Immediately southeast of the village is the Freepsum Sea or Freepsumer Meer, a former inland lake that has since been drained. The lowest point of the resulting hollow was for a long time the lowest point in Germany, at 2.5 metres below sea level, but has since been superseded in that respect by a point in Neuendorf-Sachsenbande which has officially been measured at 3.54 m (11.61 ft) below Normalnull.

The Church of Freepsum was built in the 13th century.

== Gallery ==
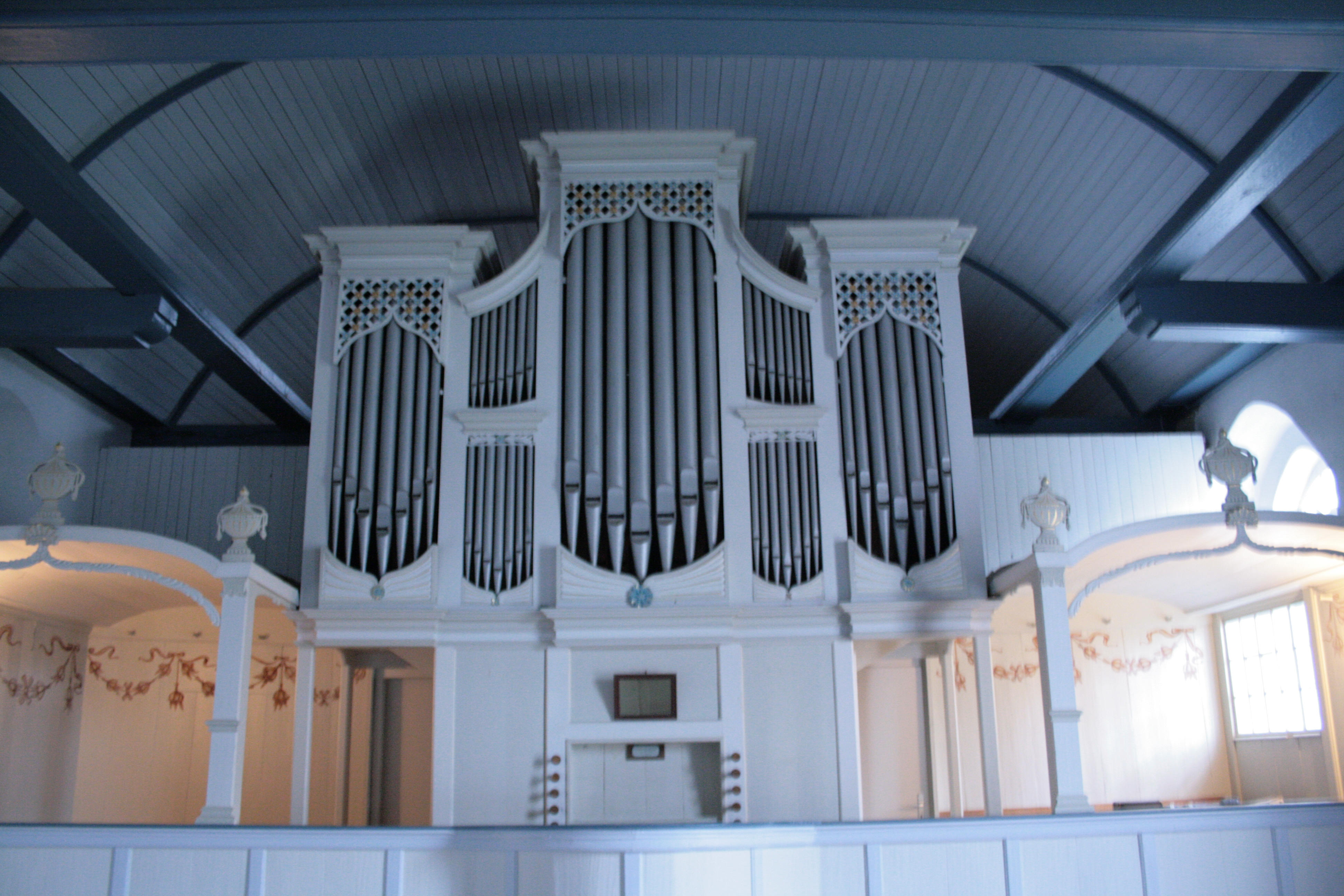
Organ in the Church of Freepsum

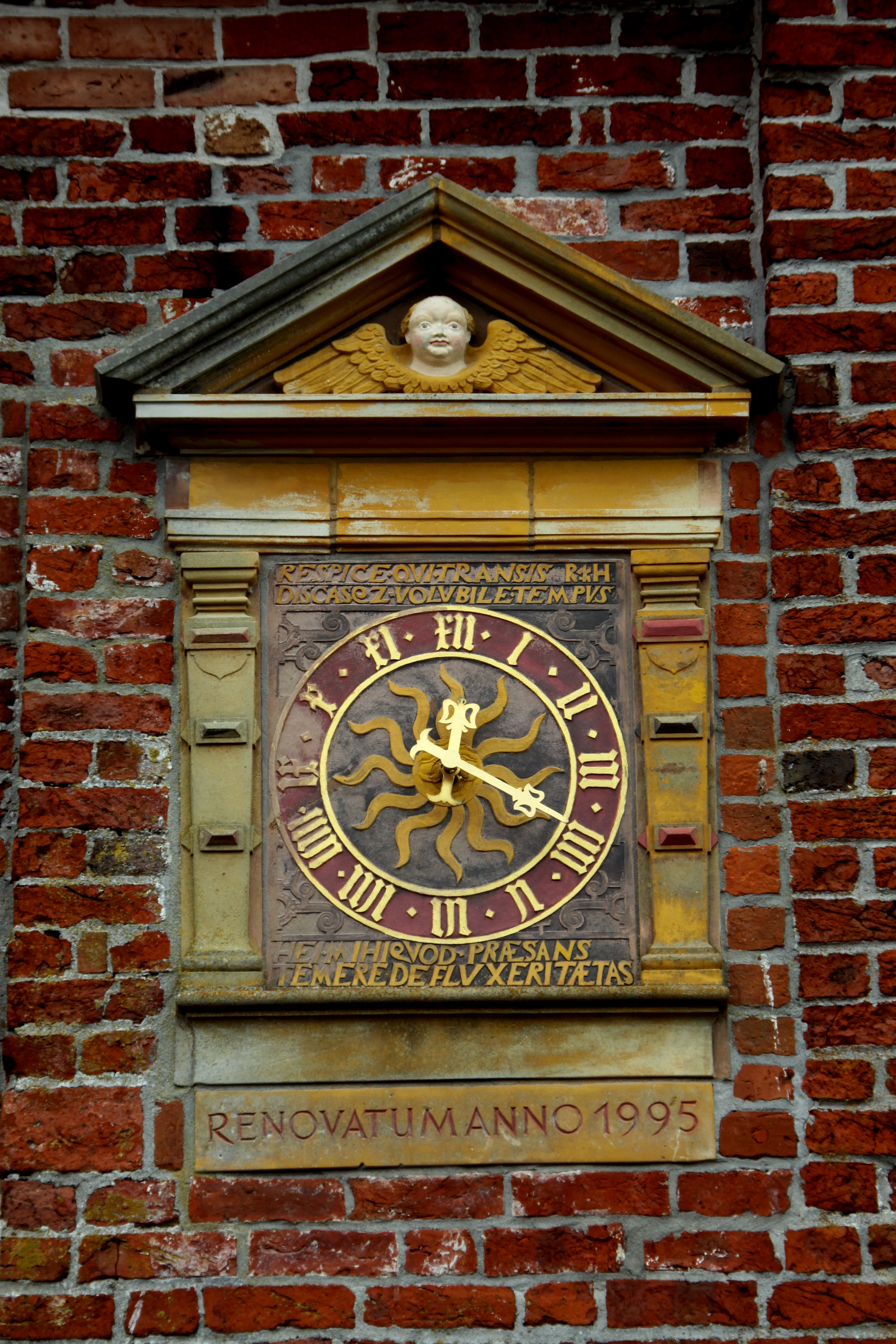
Sundial

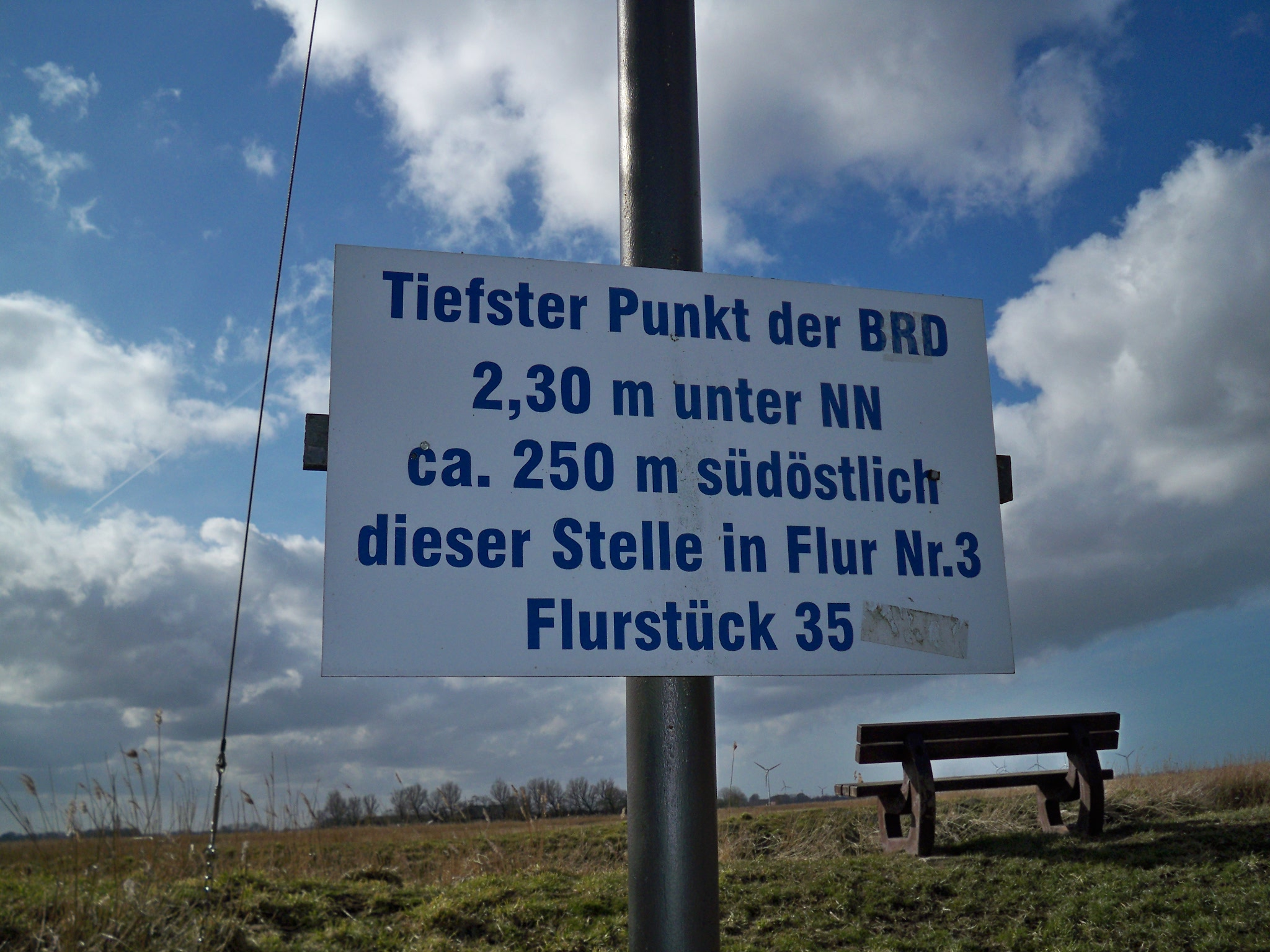
Information sign at the Freepsumer Meer
