= Cirkwehrum =

- Village of Hinte
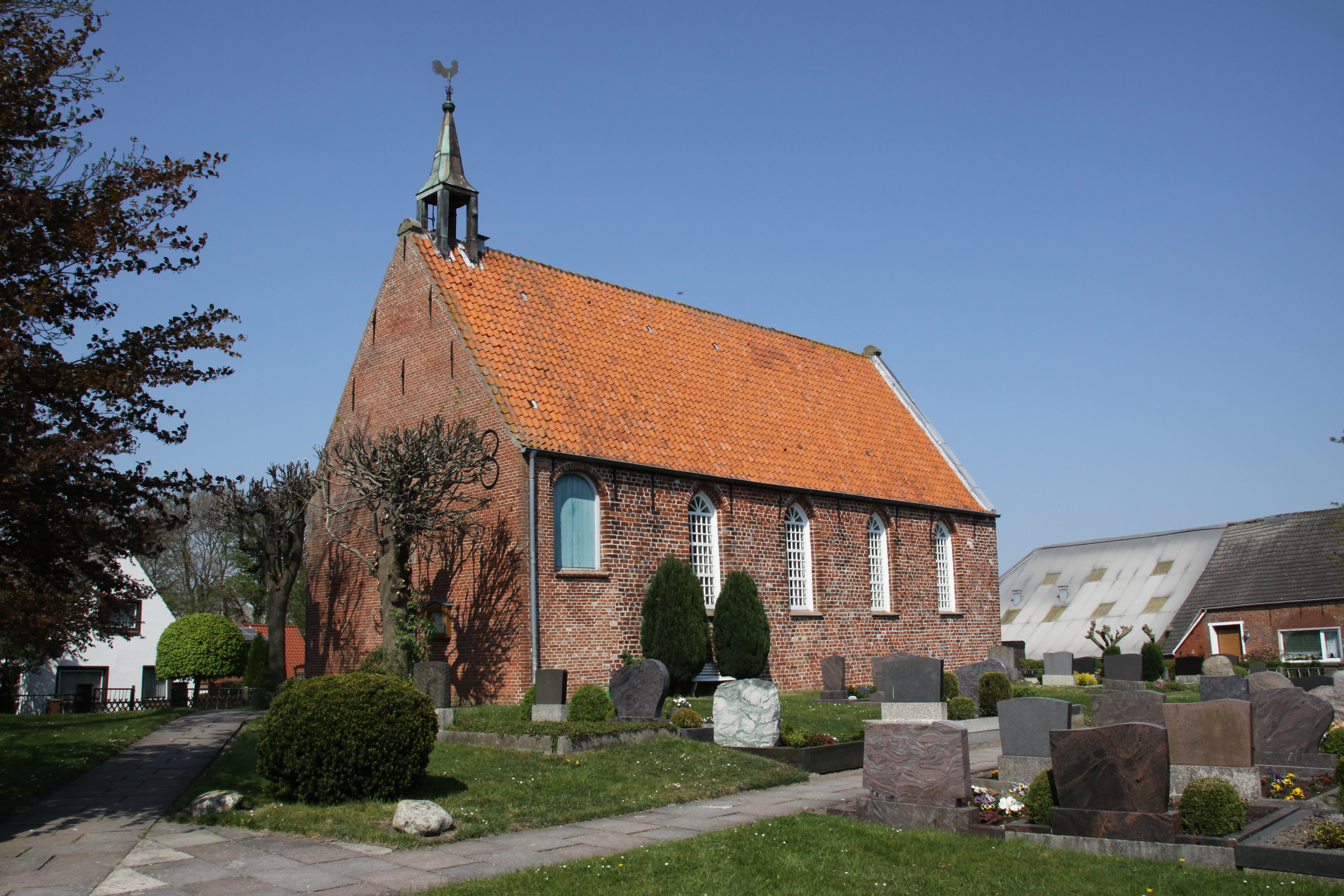
- Church of Cirkwehrum

- Coat of arms
- Interactive map of Cirkwehrum
- Location within Germany Location within Lower Saxony
- Country: Germany
- State: Lower Saxony
- District: Aurich
- Municipality: Hinte
- Elevation: 1 m (3.3 ft)

Population
  - Metro: 188
- Time zone: UTC+01:00 (CET)
  - Summer (DST): UTC+02:00 (CEST)
- Postal codes: 26759
- Dialling codes: 04925

Cirkwehrum is a small village in the region of East Frisia, in Lower Saxony, Germany. Administratively, it is an Ortsteil of the municipality of Hinte, of which it is located to the northwest. Cirkwehrum is about 8 kilometers to the north of Emden.

There was a borg near the village in the 14th century. This castle was destroyed by Ocko II tom Brok, when he made an almost successful attempt to gain control of the whole of East Frisia. The village church from that time has now also disappeared. The current church dates from 1751.
