= Upleward =

- Village of Krummhörn
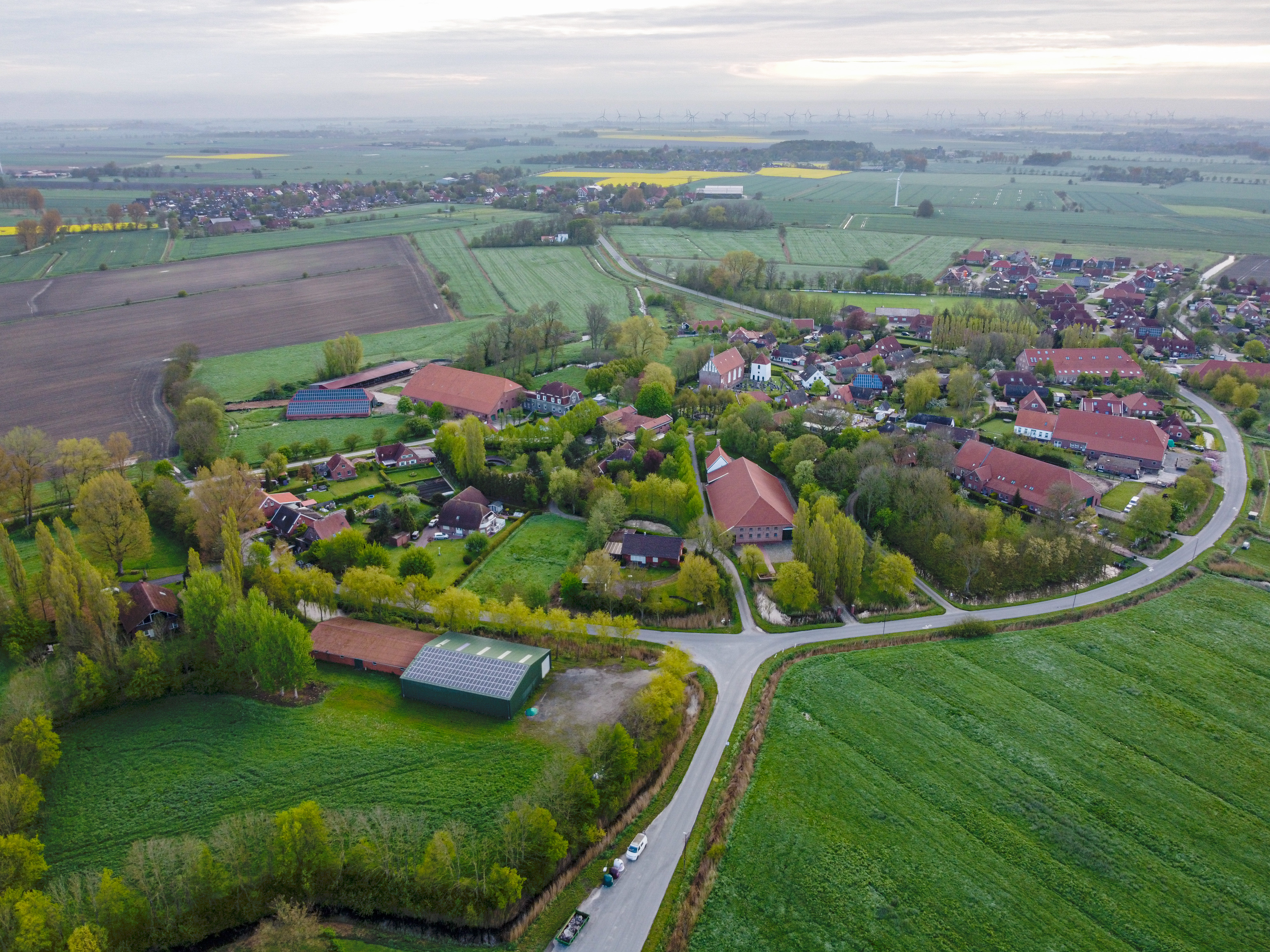
- Aerial view of Upleward

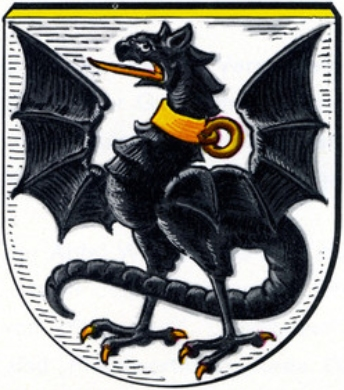
- Coat of arms
- Interactive map of Upleward
- Location within Germany Location within Lower Saxony
- Country: Germany
- State: Lower Saxony
- District: Aurich
- Municipality: Krummhörn

Area
  - Metro: 5.77 km^{2} (2.23 sq mi)
- Elevation: 5 m (16 ft)

Population
  - Metro: 395
- Time zone: UTC+01:00 (CET)
  - Summer (DST): UTC+02:00 (CEST)
- Postal codes: 26736
- Dialling codes: 04923

Upleward (East Frisian Low Saxon: Plewert) is a village in the region of East Frisia, in Lower Saxony, Germany. It is part of the municipality of Krummhörn. The village is located between Hamswehrum and Campen.

Upleward is built on a warft which has been inhabited since at least the Early Middle Ages. The village center consists of traditional single-family houses, built around the Gothic church from the 14th century. The church's narrow pointed arches are typical of the time.

In 2004, an iron dagger inscribed with the words "ANNA" and "HANA" was discovered in Upleward, dating back to 1450.

== Gallery ==
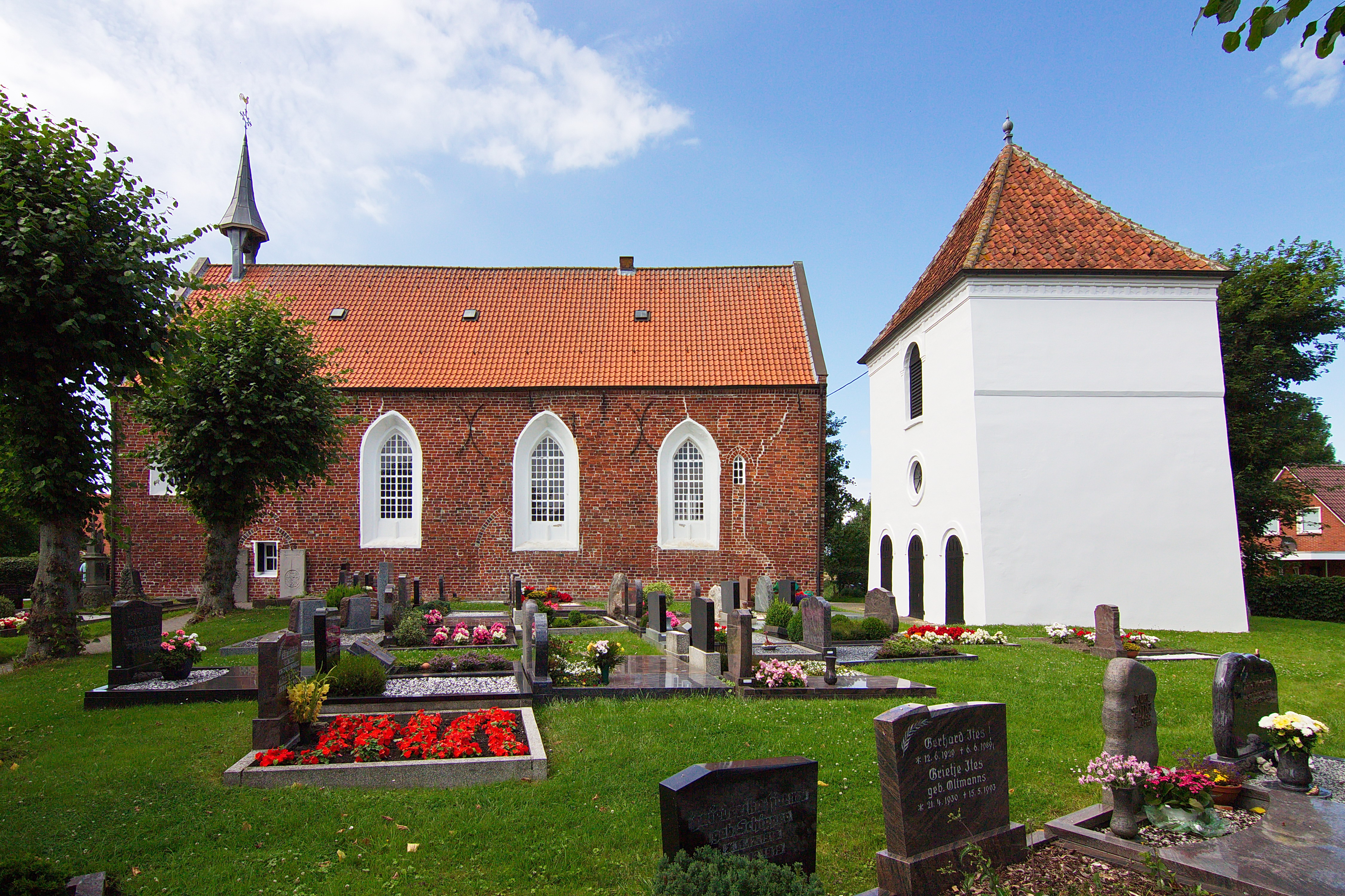
Church of Upleward

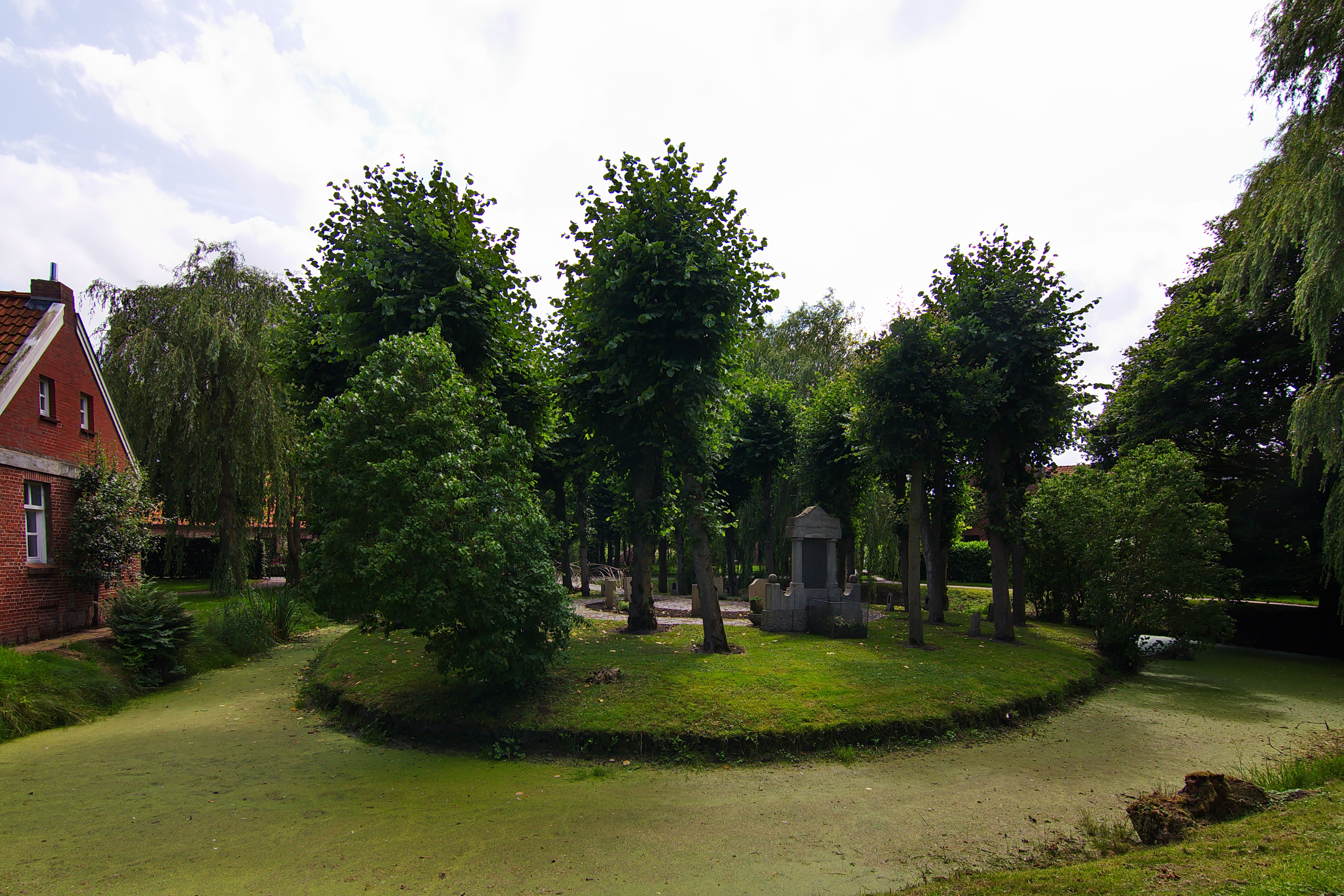
Gefallenendenkmal ('Memorial for the Fallen')

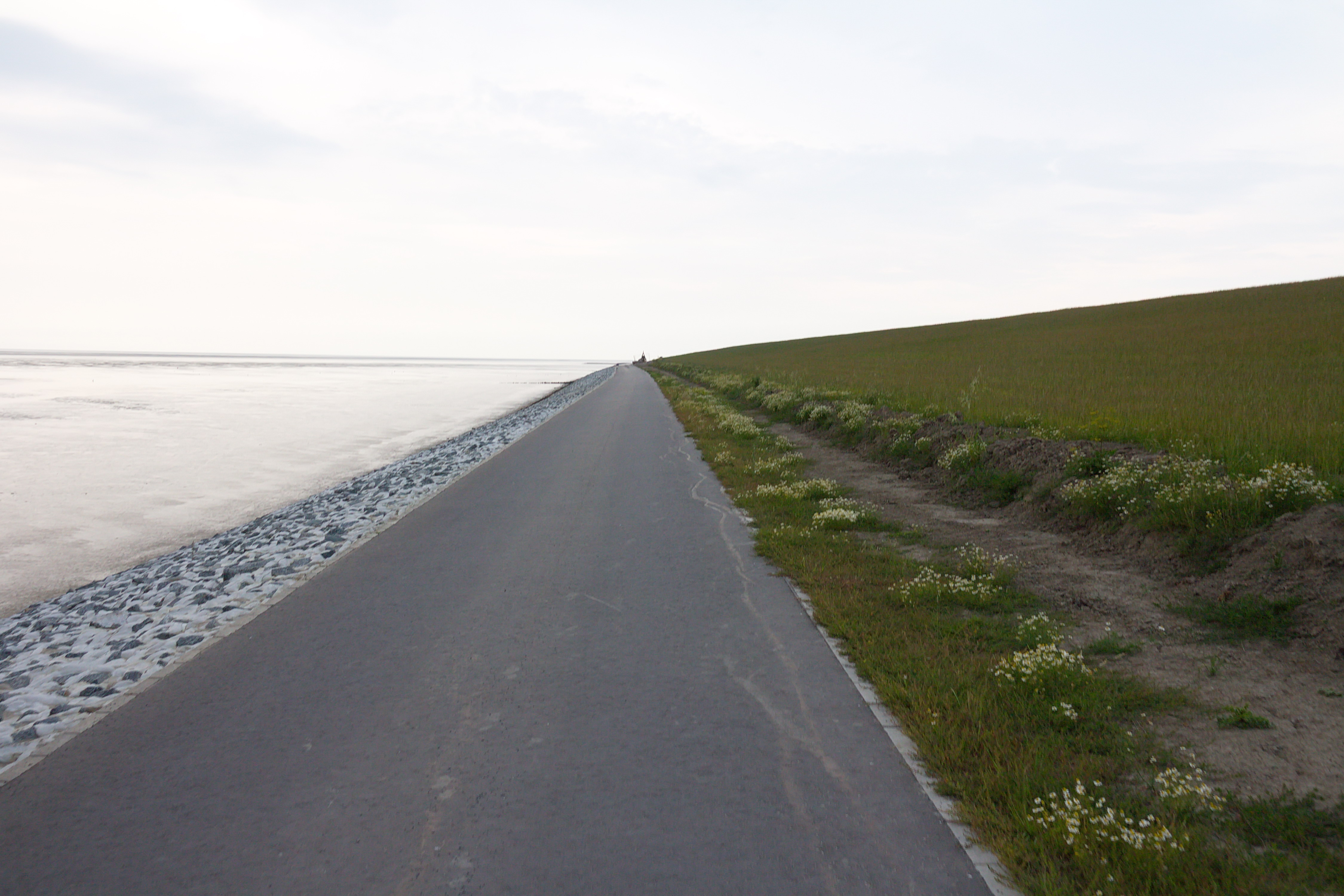
Dyke near Upleward

== Notable people ==
- Johannes Bogerman (1576–1637), Dutch theologician
