= Hamswehrum =

- Village of Krummhörn
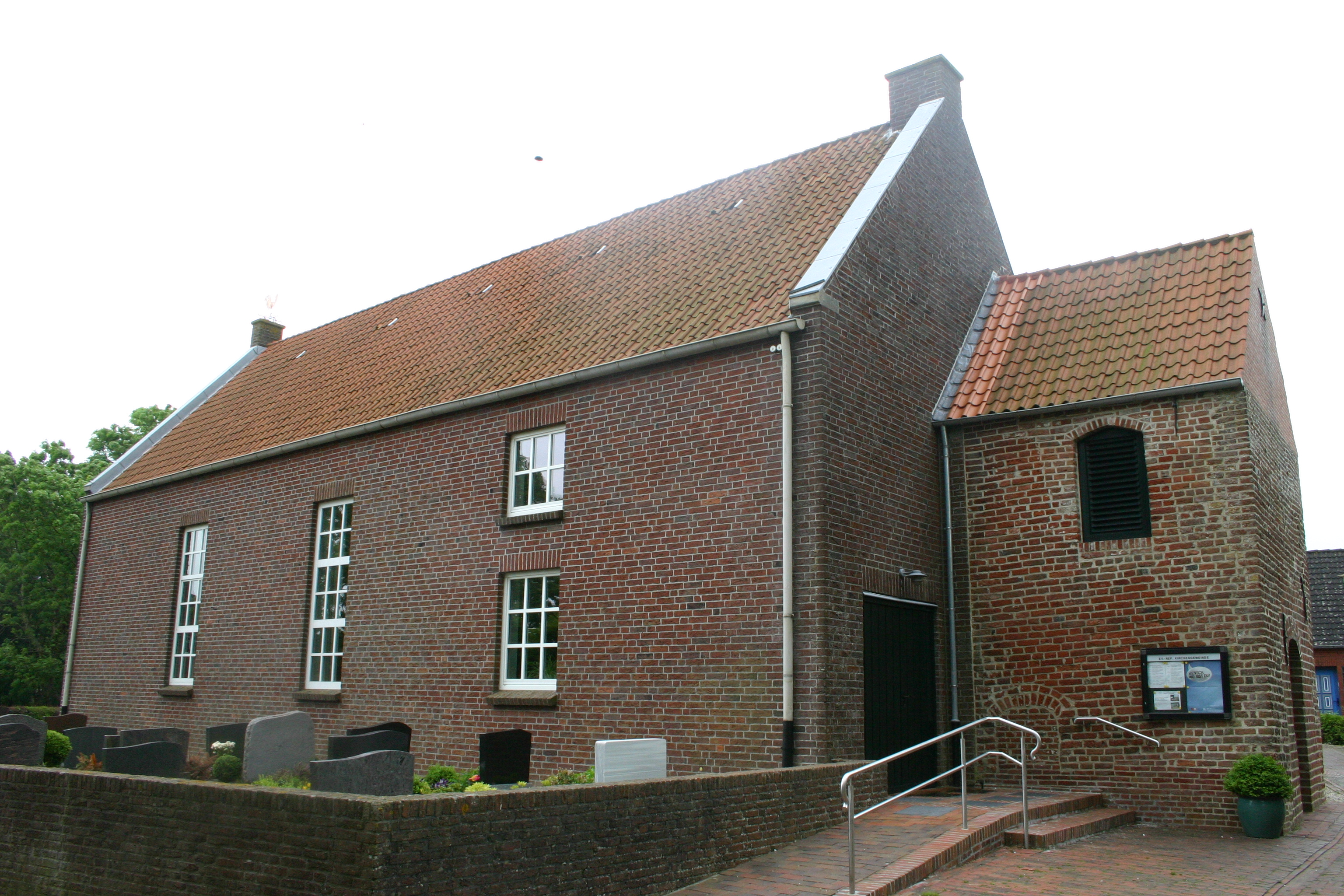
- St. Maria's Church

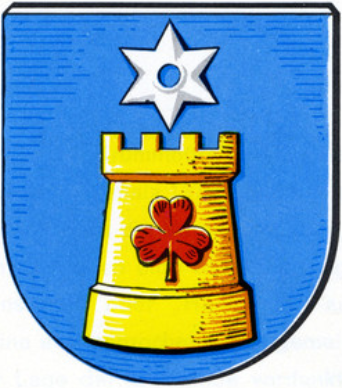
- Coat of arms
- Interactive map of Hamswehrum
- Location within Germany Location within Lower Saxony
- Country: Germany
- State: Lower Saxony
- District: Aurich
- Municipality: Krummhörn

Area
  - Metro: 6.46 km^{2} (2.49 sq mi)
- Elevation: 5 m (16 ft)

Population
  - Metro: 469
- Time zone: UTC+01:00 (CET)
  - Summer (DST): UTC+02:00 (CEST)
- Postal codes: 26736
- Dialling codes: 04923

Hamswehrum is a village in the region of East Frisia, in Lower Saxony, Germany. It is part of the municipality of Krummhörn. The village is located between Upleward and Groothusen.

The village is first mentioned in a written source in 1375 and was probably founded by the inhabitants of a disappeared place (Hamswehr or Hayenswehr). Buildings such as the Geele Börg ('Yellow Castle') appear repeatedly in the history of the place. Nowadays, only a farm named after this castle remains a reminder of this. The 15th-century church was demolished in 1967 and replaced by a new church, St. Maria's Church, the following year.
