= Pewsum =

- Village of Krummhörn
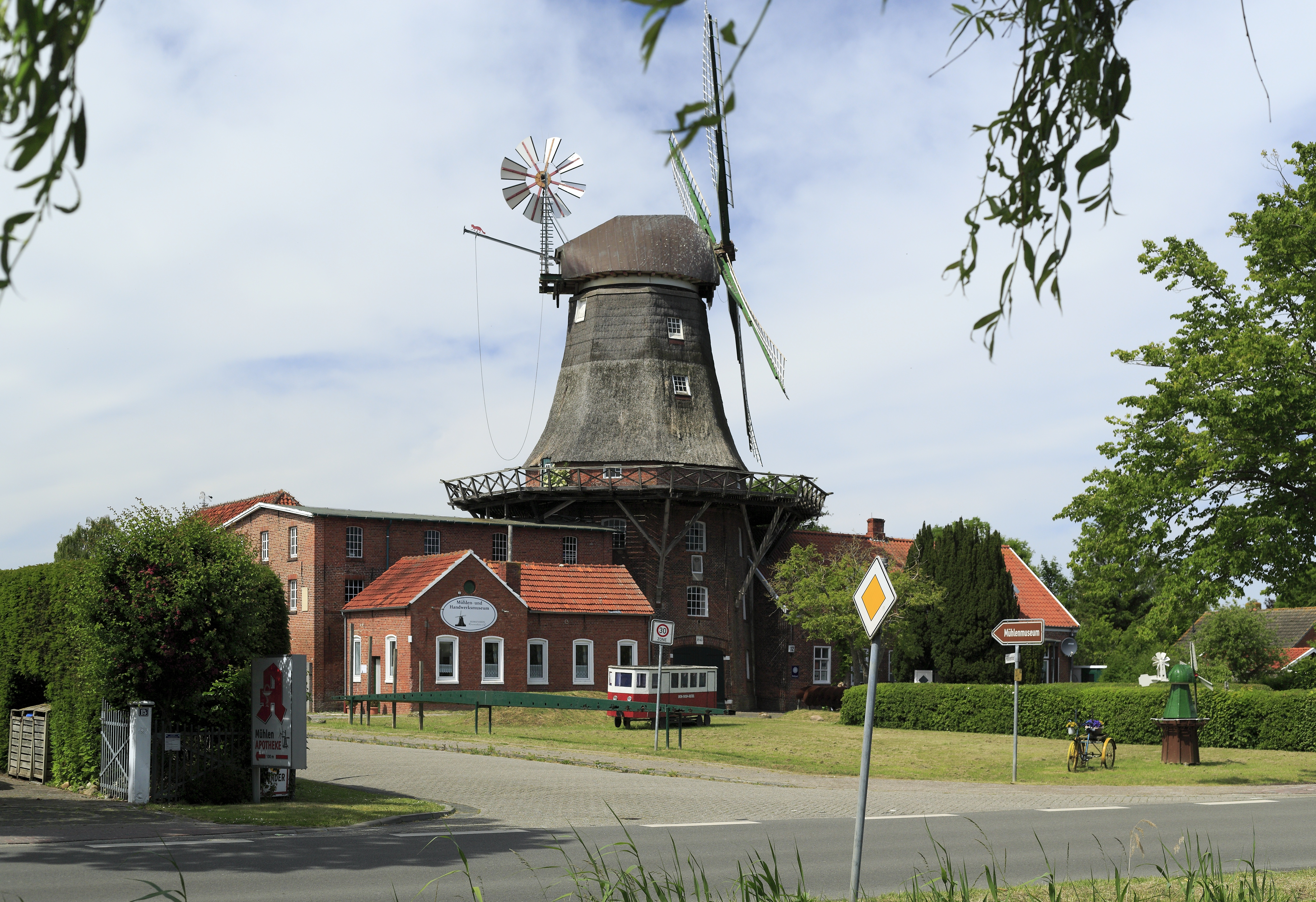
- Windmill in Pewsum

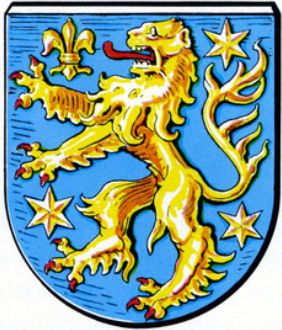
- Coat of arms
- Interactive map of Pewsum
- Location within Germany Location within Lower Saxony
- Coordinates: 53°25′55″N 7°05′43″E
- Country: Germany
- State: Lower Saxony
- District: Aurich
- Municipality: Krummhörn

Area
  - Total: 6.68 km^{2} (2.58 sq mi)
- Elevation: 0 m (0 ft)

Population (2006-12-31)
  - Total: 3,352
  - Density: 502/km^{2} (1,300/sq mi)
- Time zone: UTC+01:00 (CET)
  - Summer (DST): UTC+02:00 (CEST)
- Postal codes: 26736
- Dialling codes: 04923

Pewsum is a village in the municipality of Krummhörn in the west of East Frisia, in Lower Saxony, Germany. Pewsum is both the administrative seat as well as the trade and craft centre of the municipality. The number of inhabitants was 3,352 in 2006 and the village lies at a height of 0 m above sea level (NN).

== History ==
Pewsum was first mentioned in 945 as the castle of the Manninga family of chieftains. From 1565, Pewsum belonged to the Cirksena dynasty. Well-known people who resided in Pewsum included the Swedish marshall, Dodo von Knyphausen, General Peter Ernst II von Mansfeld and the Great Elector.

The castle fell into ruins in the 18th century and was partly demolished and sold. The remaining buildings have since been restored and form part of the East Frisian Open Air Museum (Ostfriesisches Freilichtmuseum).

In 1972, Pewsum lost its independence and became part of the newly founded parish of Krummhörn, albeit retaining the administrative headquarters.

== Religion ==
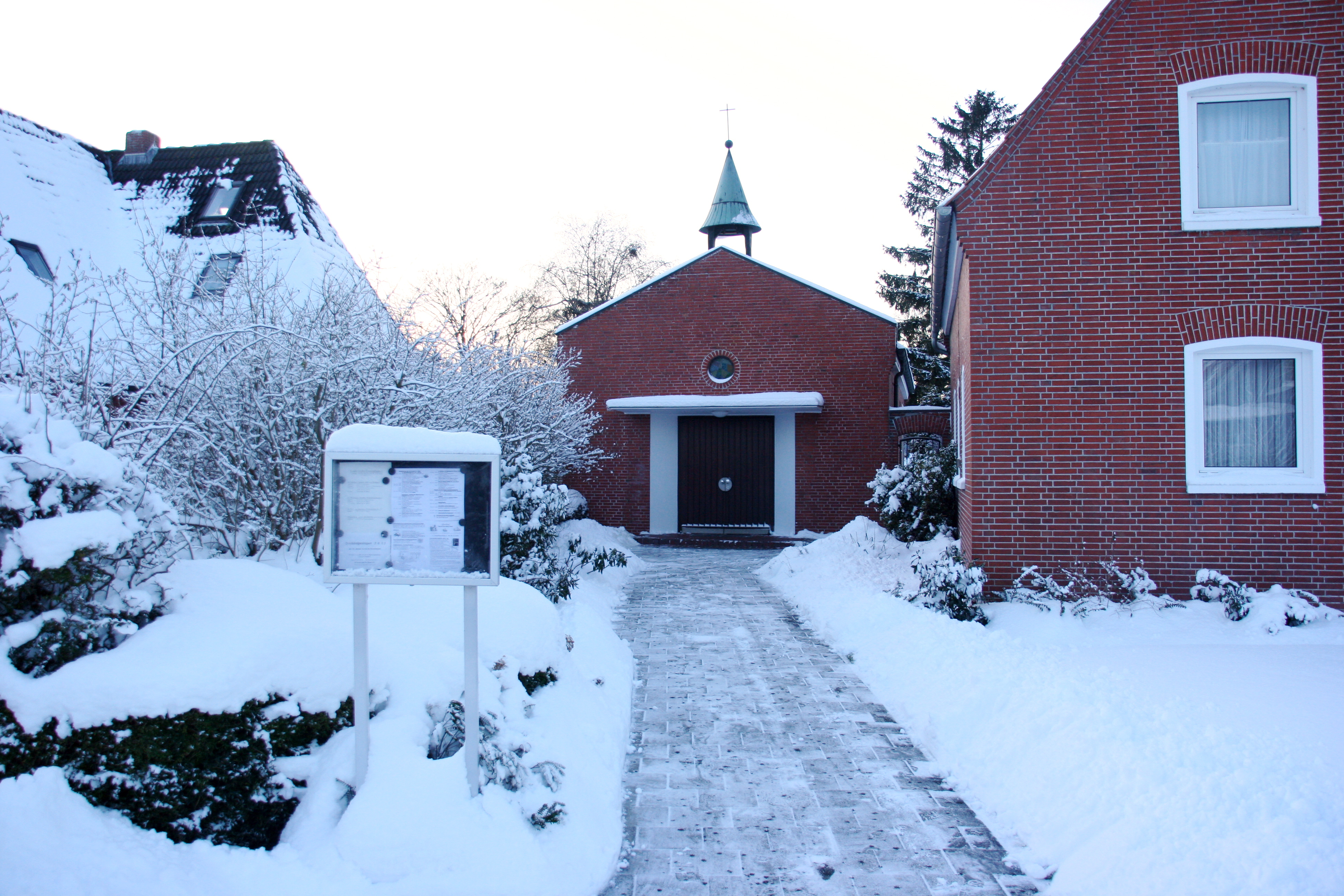
Catholic chapel of St. Hedwig

Pewsum is one of the Lutheran islands in the municipality of Krummhörn which is otherwise dominated by the Evangelical Reformed Church. Its place of worship is the St. Nicholas Church (St. Nikolai-Kirche) dating from the 14th century, which was given a new brick façade during a major renovation in 1862.

The Catholic chapel of St. Hedwig dates to the 1950s. It was built in 1959 on a private plot of land by refugees from Germany's former eastern territories. The congregation is looked after by the Catholic parish of Emden.

The Pewsum Brethren have their place of meeting in a former kindergarten, which they have rebuilt into a community centre. Originally they were based at Hamswehrum. The Pewsum Baptists have their centre in Jennelt, but meet in Pewsum as a cell group.

== Transport ==
Pewsum is linked by the L 2 and 3 state roads. These connect Pewsum and other villages in the parish of Krummhörn with Emden and thence the A 31 motorway.

The Emden-Pewsum-Greetsiel Light Railway used to link Pewsum and Greetsiel to Emden. This metre gauge line was closed in 1963 and passenger services switched over to buses. Today Pewsum is linked by bus with the former county town of Norden and with Emden.

== Places of interest ==
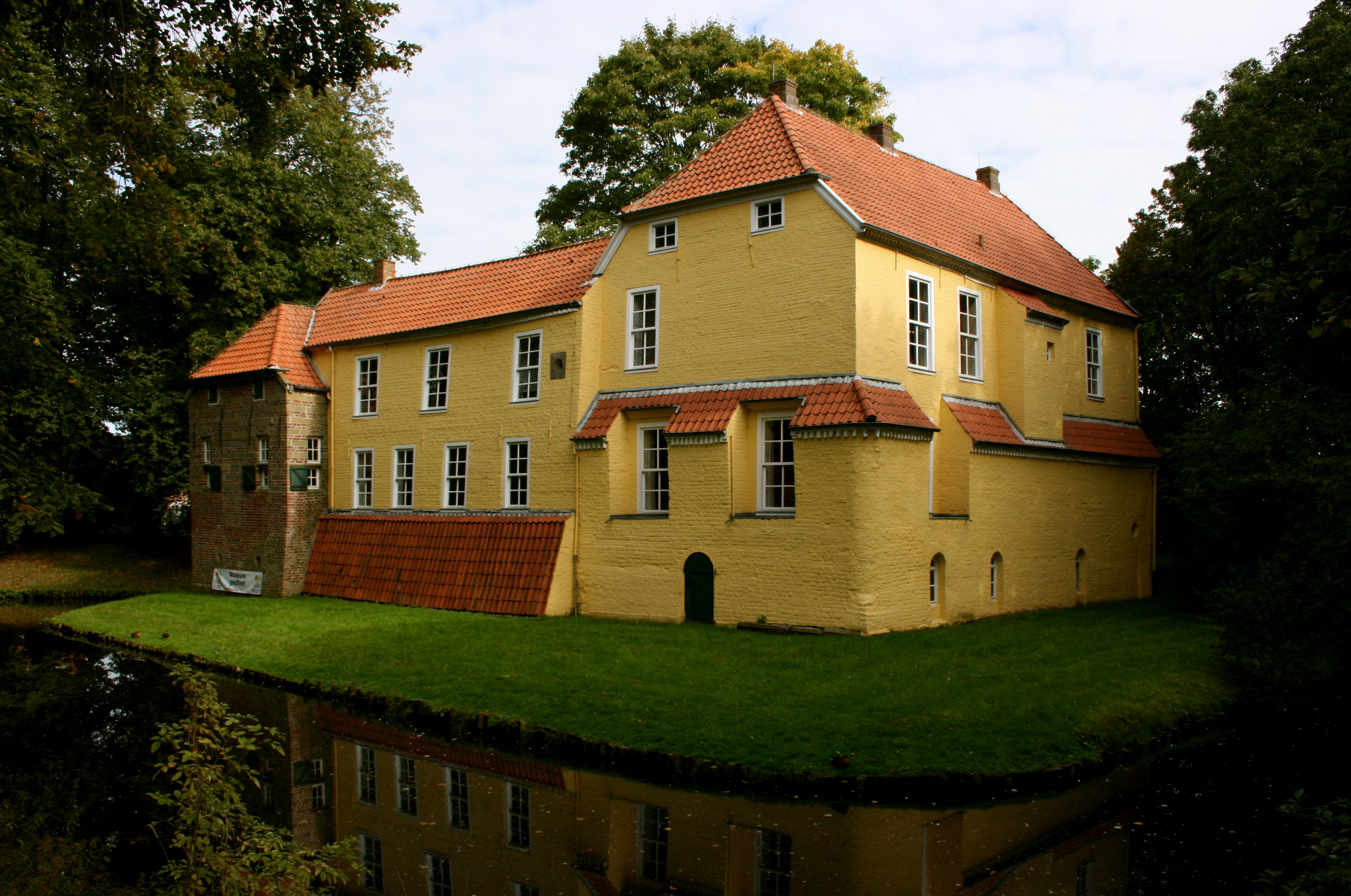
Manningaburg

The Manningaburg was built in 1458 and is the emblem of Pewsum. In a three-storey tower mill (of the Galerieholländer type) is the Pewsum Mill Museum.

== Sport ==
TuS Pewsum is the largest sports club in the village. The men's football team played until the end of the 2008/2009 season in the Oberliga Niedersachsen West (fifth league) and since then in the sixth-class Bezirksoberliga Weser-Ems.

== Notable people ==
- Pewsum was the seat of the Manninga chieftains from around 1400. The last male descendant of this line, Hoyko Manninga, resided at the Manningaburg, and sold the castle in 1565 to Count Edzard II of East Frisia and his wife, Katharina of Sweden .
- Hermine Heusler-Edenhuizen (1872–1955), first registered female doctor in Germany

== Sources ==
- Lampe, Regine (1989). Das Burgmuseum in Pewsum (Ostfriesischer Kunstführer, Heft 13). Aurich.
