= Organ landscape of East Frisia =

One of the richest Orgellandschaften in the world

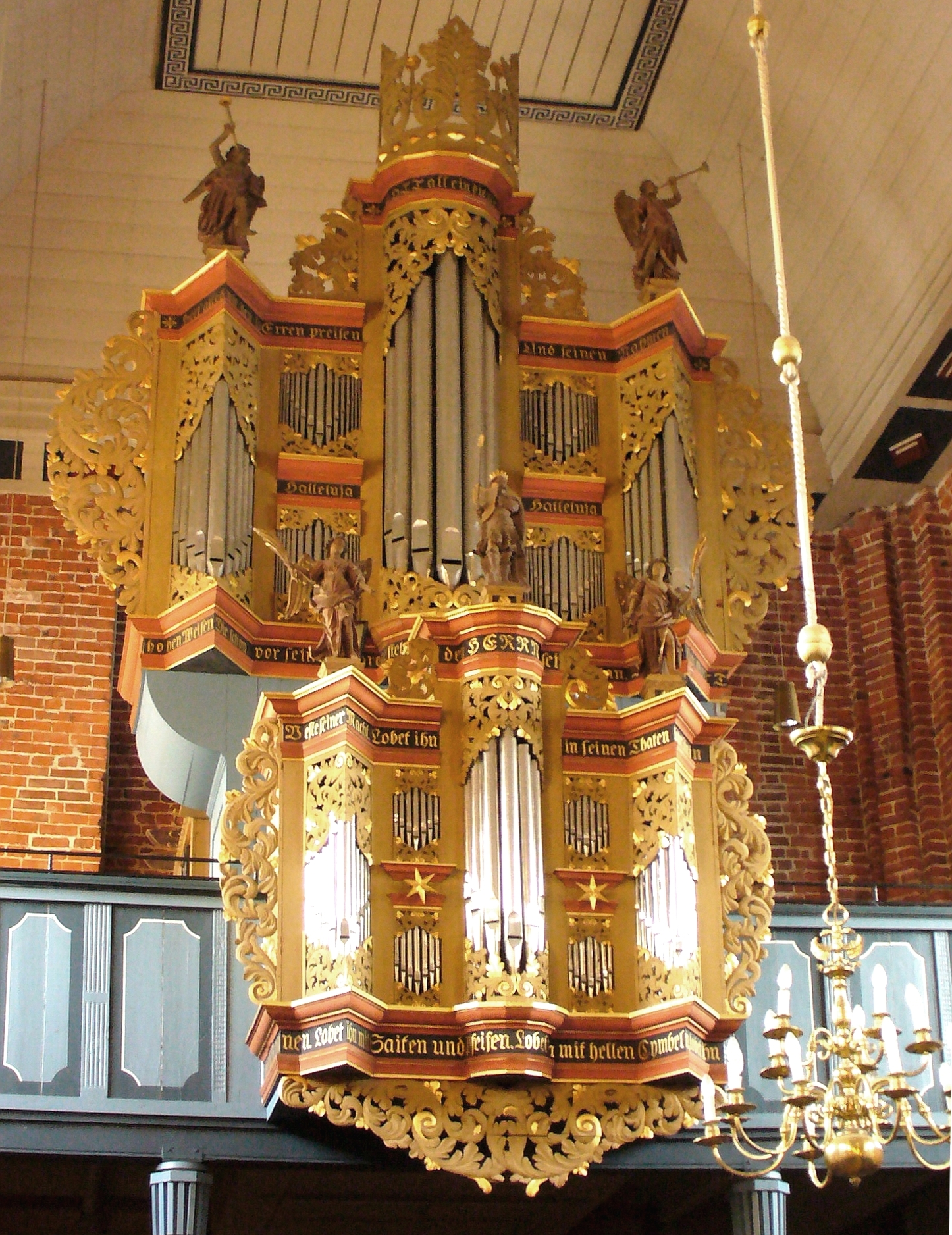
Holy organ in Marienhafe

With more than 90 important organs from six centuries, the Organ landscape East Frisia is one of the richest organ landscapes in the world. The term organ landscape alone refers to the historically determined regional characteristics of the organs. 60 of the East Frisian organs date from before 1850. In addition, there are 15 historical Prospekt, behind which new Werke are installed. While Dutch organ building was influential for East Frisia in the 15th and 16th centuries, influences from Hamburg and Westphalia were added in the 17th and 18th centuries. East Frisian organ building in the 19th century was conservative until around 1870 and created instruments according to Baroque building principles. As relatively few new organs were built between 1870 and 1950, many historical instruments were preserved. Almost all of the original instruments have been restored in an exemplary manner over the last 50 years, bringing them back to their original sound and providing impetus for restoration practice and organ building worldwide. In recent decades, the public has become increasingly aware of the value of these instruments and the organ landscape of East Frisia has been made accessible to organ builders and organists from all over the world, as well as to the general public.

== History ==
=== Gothic ===
When the organ became the main instrument in the Christian liturgy during the Gothic period, organs found their way into many churches. A flourishing organ culture is documented in East Frisia as early as the late Gothic period, which was mainly influenced by the Netherlands, where a center of Northern European organ building was located in the 15th to 17th centuries. In Krummhörn alone, there is evidence of ten organ works from the second half of the 15th century, when East Frisia experienced a heyday under Ulrich I. One of these first organs was the work of Master Thidricus de Dominis, which the Marienkirche in Marienhafe received in 1437. In 1480, Master Hinrick built an organ for Emden. Around 1500, many East Frisian monasteries and churches already had an organ. These Gothic instruments were so-called Blockwerks, in which the individual ranks of pipes could not yet be operated separately, but instead the full work always sounded. The pipes were usually made of hammered lead and the labia have the characteristic Gothic pointed arches. As a rule, the instruments were fitted with richly painted double doors until the 17th century. These closeable doors were installed for artistic, tonal and liturgical reasons, but also for practical reasons to protect the organ from bird droppings and other soiling.

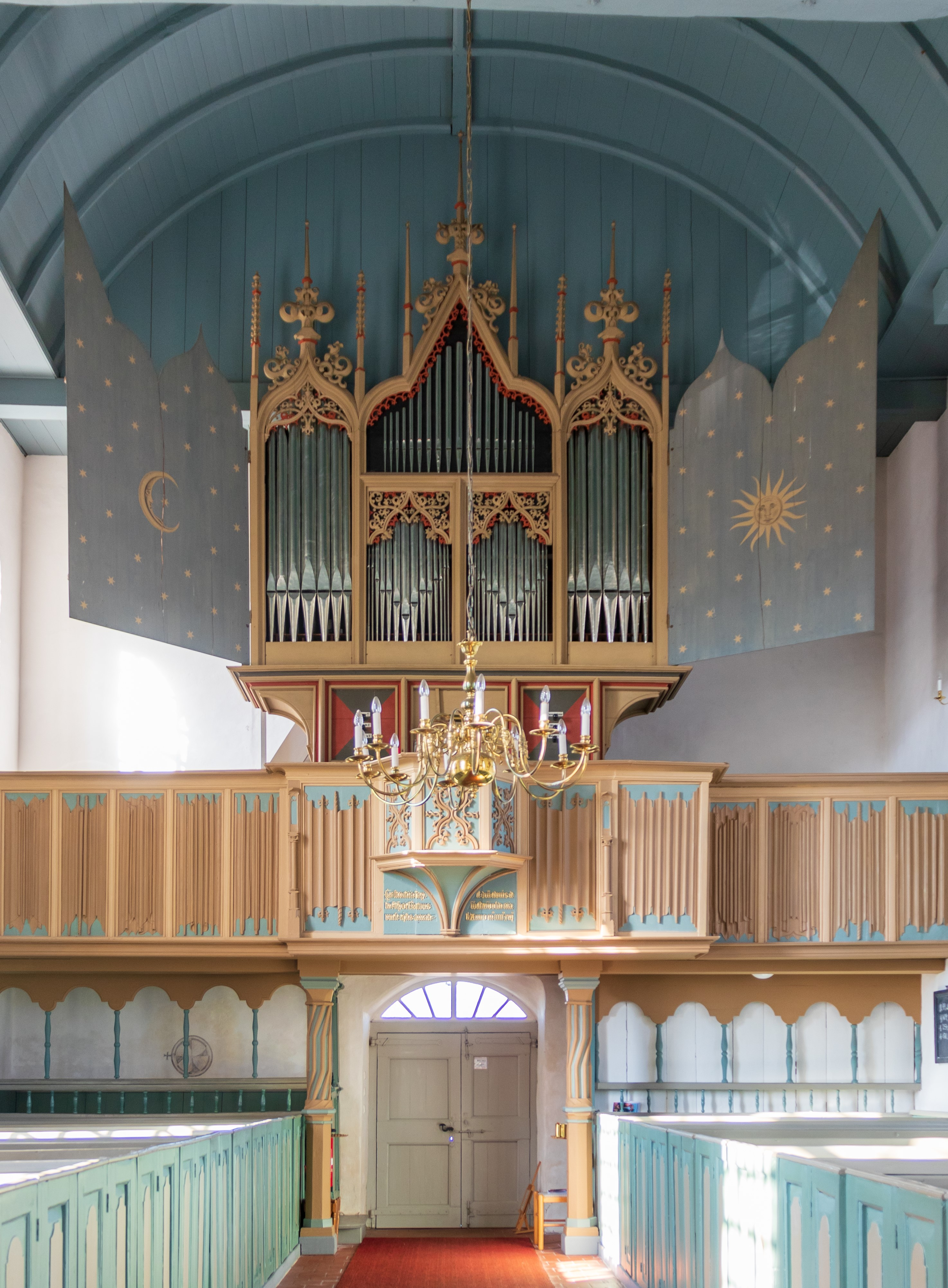
Organ in Rysum

One of the world's oldest organs, still preserved in its basic state and playable to this day, can be found in Rysum. The instrument was probably built around 1440 by Master Harmannus from Groningen, who is also associated with the Organ of the Groningen Martinikerk (around 1450). The Rysumers paid in kind and asked the local chieftain Olde Imell in writing for permission.

To ship their fat cattle across the Ems to Groningen to pay their debts in Groningen for the organ they had had built there.

— Eggerik Beninga,

Originally, this instrument was probably a blockwerk with a range of B-f^{2} for the middle to high pitch (the treble) with a bass action, the pipes of which have been preserved in the prospectus with the original scaling. A lever at the console for this pre-stop still bears witness to the transformation of the blockwerk into an organ with slider chests. This conversion can probably be dated to 1513, as the organist's pulpit inserted into the gallery bears this date. The principal stops made of hammered metal are extremely leaded and sound unusually dark and intense. The interplay of organ and bell is impressive, as Harald Vogel has demonstrated using the Redeuntes compositions from the Buxheim Organ Book. Until then, the long organ stop sustained notes in the bass could not be interpreted liturgically. By using the bell, which in Rysum corresponds to the pitch of the organ, these compositions could be musically re-explored. The case of the Rysum organ is characterized by strong gallery profiles, similar to the Gothic lower case in Westerhusen. The pipe fields with their veil boards, the tapering pointed arches and (reconstructed) crowning pinnacles show typical late Gothic characteristics.

=== Late Renaissance and early Baroque ===
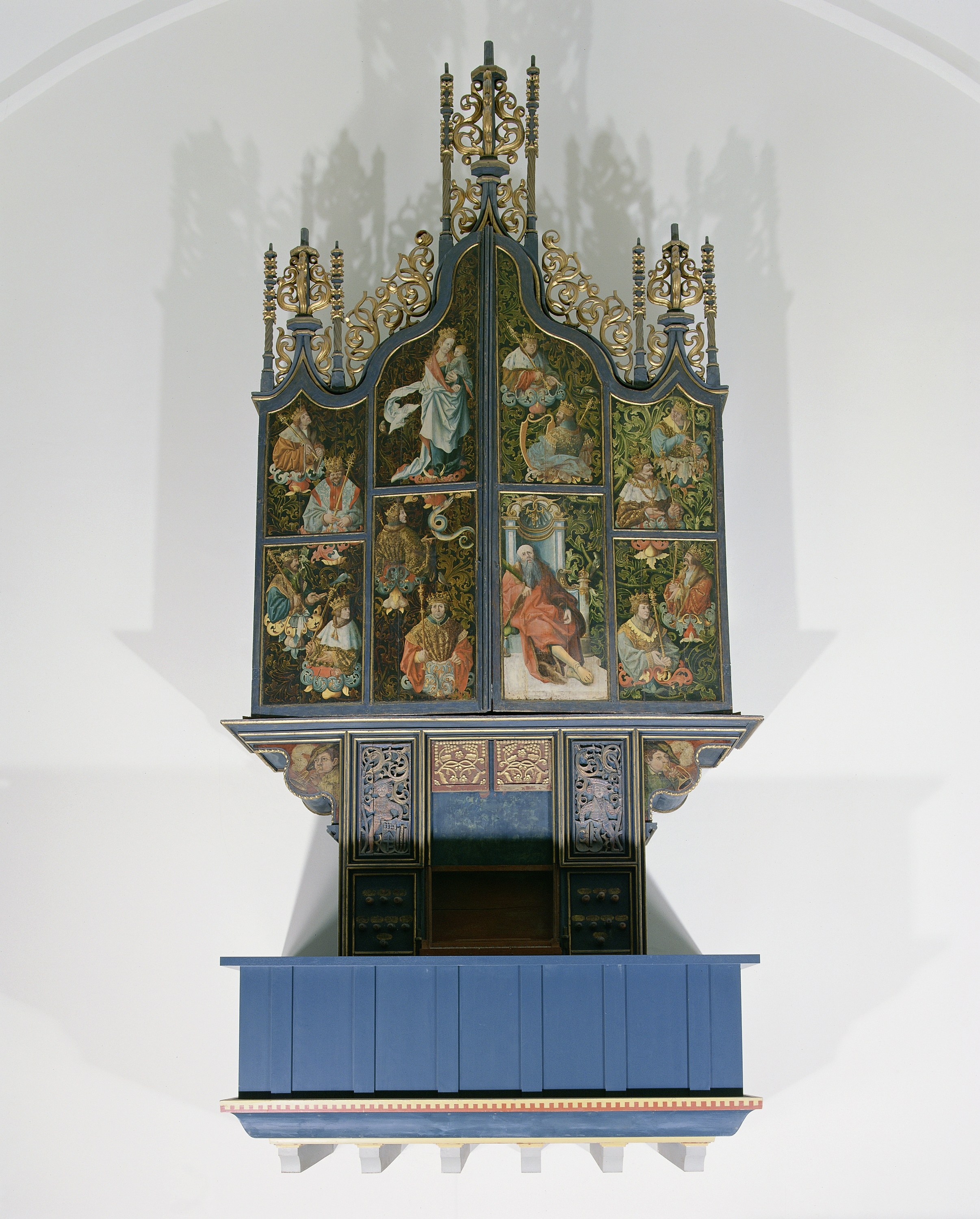
Organ by Petrus von Emden for Scheemda (1526)

In the 16th and 17th centuries, East Frisia was influenced by Dutch and Hamburg organ culture. Emden was the center of East Frisian organ building in the 16th century. Petrus von Emden built an organ for Groothusen in 1520. Johannes Emedensis ("von Emden") is known to have built an organ for Uphusen in 1531, of which the later double doors (1571) and case fillings are still preserved. The ornate façade of his organ (1526) in Scheemda in the Netherlands with its chiseling pipes is now in the Rijksmuseum Amsterdam. Religious refugees of the Reformed faith, who fled from the Netherlands during the Eighty Years' War and found refuge in Emden, also shaped organ building in East Frisia in the late 16th and early 17th centuries. The external structure is characterized by the central polygonal bass tower and two lateral pointed towers for the tenor pipes. The high (and correspondingly short) pipes in the treble are arranged between them in two flat fields, which are often two-storied. The Hamburg facade owes much to this Dutch influence. The original range of the keyboards on Renaissance instruments of FGA-g^{2}a^{2} was extended over the centuries to the modern range from C upwards. The Renaissance style is also characterized by the type of veiling above the façade pipes, the crowning on the pipe towers and the continuous banners. It should be emphasized that in many East Frisian organs of the 17th century, pipe material from the previous instruments of the 16th century was reused. With the advent of the Baroque era, the double doors gave way to side ears made of veilwork.

The Organ of the Great Church in Leer goes back to the organ from the Thedinga Monastery, which was probably built by the German-Dutch organ builder Andreas de Mare around 1570. When Count Enno III donated this organ to the reformed parish in Leer in 1609, Marten de Mare converted it into a Renaissance instrument for the old Liudgeri church. In 1787, the organ was transferred to the Great Church and over the centuries underwent several expansions to become a large town organ, whereby the respective basic components were essentially retained. The internal supporting structure of the Hauptwerk probably originates from the de Mare organ, the proportions of which are still reflected in the façade.

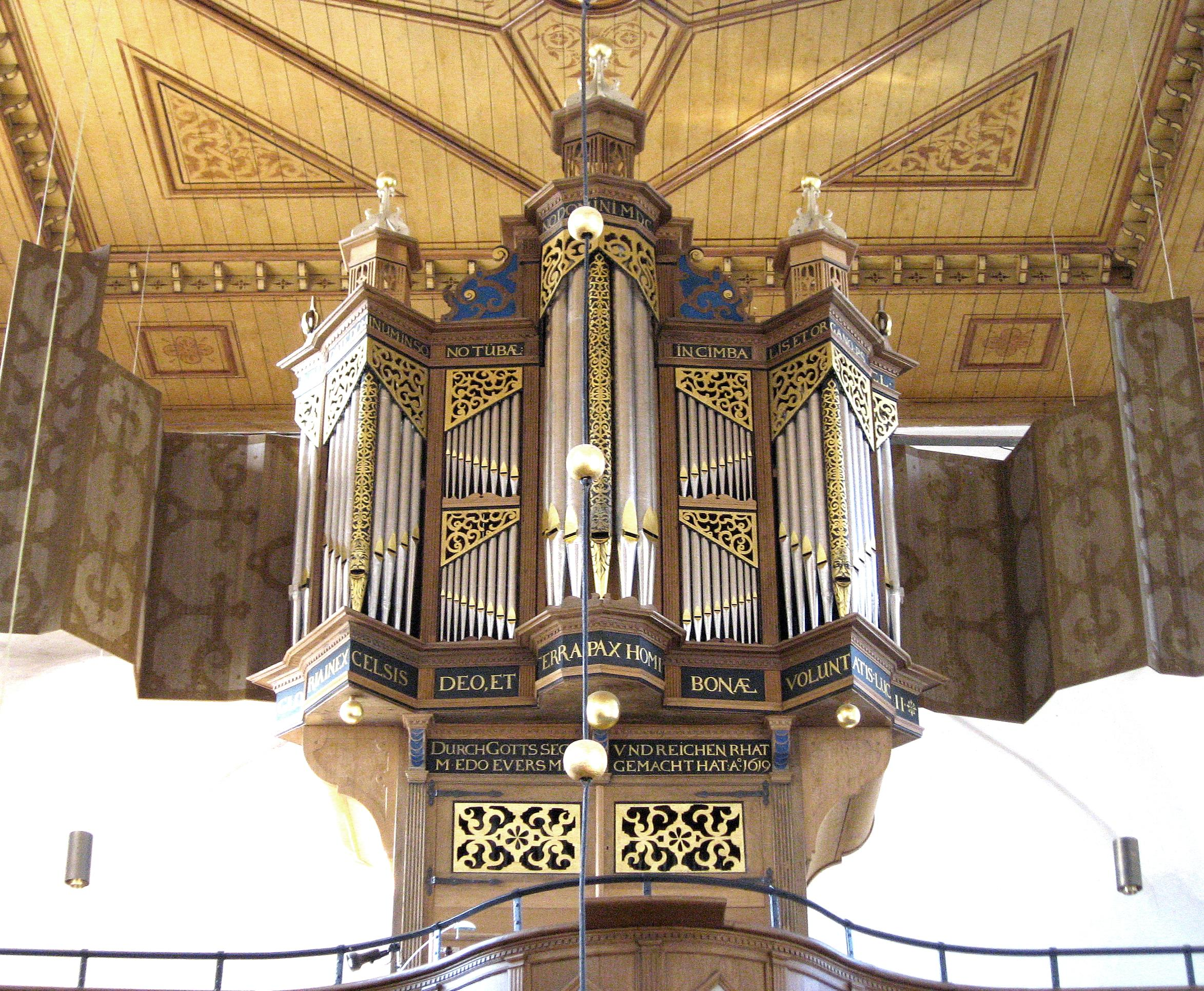
Organ in Osteel

The Dutch organ builder Johannes Millensis built the organ in Larrelt between 1618 and 1619 using older stops from the 16th century. Between 1848 and 1855, the organ was extensively rebuilt by Gerd Sieben Janssen, reusing about half of the old stops. The organ reflects the early Dutch influence on organ building in East Frisia and, with its old lead pipes, is considered particularly suitable for representing the vocally influenced polyphony of the Renaissance.

The precious late Renaissance Organ in Osteel, which is one of the best-preserved Renaissance organs in northern Germany, also comes from a German-Dutch organ builder: Edo Evers from Groningen. Evers used pipes and parts of the case from the old Andreas de Mare organ (1566-67) of the Ludgeri Church in Norden for his work from 1619. Characteristic are the rich decorations on the middle façade pipe in each tower. The individual stops are characterized by tonal elegance and high vocal quality. As they retain their great transparency even in various combinations, they are particularly suitable for the performance of polyphonic Renaissance music.

A key factor in the further development of organ building was the introduction of organ accompaniment for congregational singing in church services in East Frisia from 1640. Prior to this, the congregation sang unaccompanied and the organ only had a liturgical function. In larger churches, it played alternately with the choir or took over individual organ verses, i.e. arrangements of motets, chorales or psalms. For the first time in 1640, an attempt is reported in Emden to have the organ played together with the congregation for the upcoming Christmas celebrations, after the congregation had requested that the organ be played for the first time.

The question was raised as to whether it could not be permitted, as many are inclined to do so, that the organ could and may be used for singing before the sermon on the forthcoming feast day, whereupon it was decided that such an attempt may be made on this feast day.

—

After such hesitant beginnings, the organ quickly asserted itself in its new function as a vocal accompaniment, but this necessitated a new sound concept.

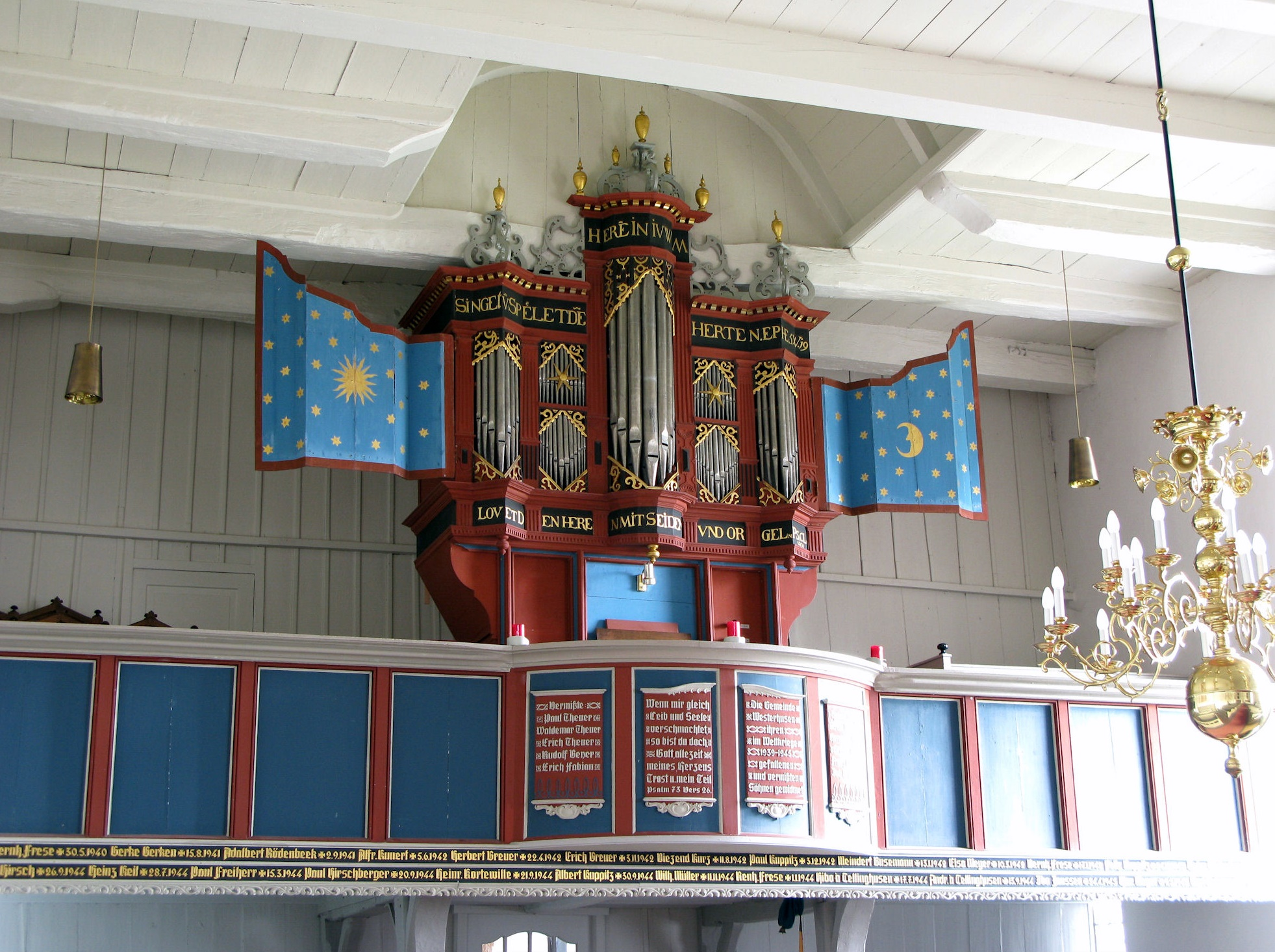
Organ in Westerhusen

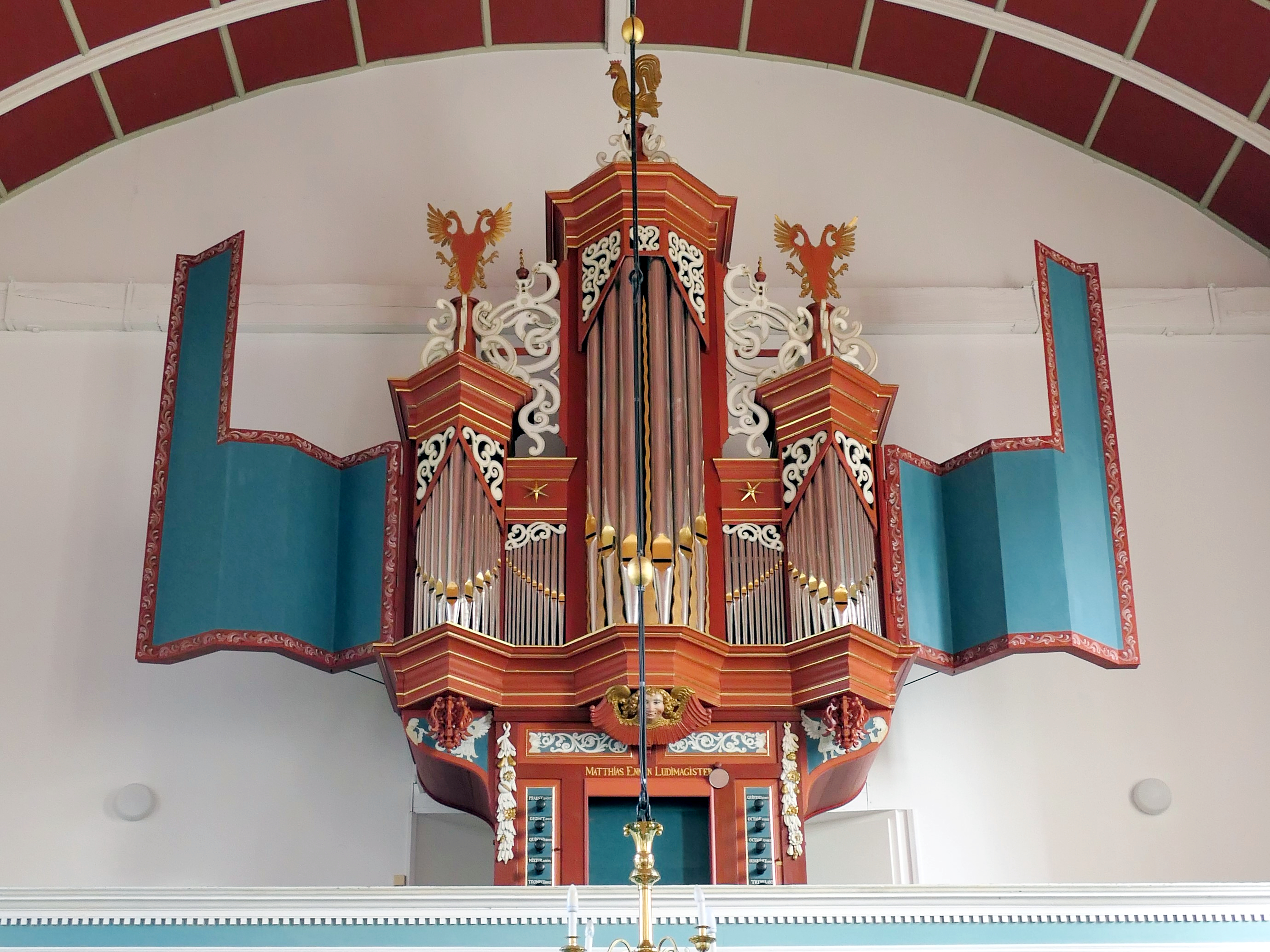
Organ in Uttum

With its powerful sounds despite its limited Disposition, the organ in Westerhusen by Jost Sieburg (1642-43) was specially designed for strong congregational singing. For this purpose, a large part of the stops from the Gothic predecessor organ (around 1500) were rebuilt behind a Hamburg façade. The wide, heavily leaded Gothic Principal stops were cut open and soldered back together in a narrower scale. This resulted in relatively wide labia. The four-foot principal in the facade sounds powerful and rich in overtones. The colorful and overtone-rich trumpet with the open throats and short cups is typical of the Renaissance style. Alongside the Uttum organ, it is considered to be one of the oldest Trumpet stop in existence. The mixture gives the plenum a brilliant sound, which is further enhanced by the Meantone temperament with pure thirds. Due to its high choirs and narrowly scaled pipes, the mixture is designed for homophonic accompaniment of congregational singing.

The organ in Uttum was built around 1660 by an unknown master and is a resounding testimony to the heyday of Dutch Renaissance organ building. It is assumed that the Cornelius and Michael Slegel brothers from Zwolle were the builders. The structure of the case with the trapezoidal central tower and the two bass pipes standing next to each other in the middle is typical of the Groningen organ style of the 17th century. Pipe material was used either from the predecessor organ or from an organ from an abandoned monastery church. According to an old tradition, this is said to be the Sielmönken Monastery. The pipework with its singing, vocal principals and other colorful stops imitating different instrument families is almost completely original, including the trumpet stop, which is considered one of the oldest in the world alongside the Westerhus organ.

==== Arp Schnitger ====
Arp Schnitger from Hamburg, with whom Baroque organ building reached its peak in Northern Europe, also helped shape the organ culture of East Frisia. Schnitger completed the Werkprinzip with works that were structurally and tonally independent of each other (Hauptwerk, in a reduced form as a Rückpositiv in the gallery parapet, Pedal in separate lateral pedal towers, in larger organs also Brustwerk and Oberwerk). In contrast to the rather mild aliquot stops in the works of the late Renaissance, Schnitger created organs with a brilliant plenum and a rich inventory of reed stops. Other mixed voices such as Rauschpfeife, Sesquialtera and Scharf allow a variety of different plenum sounds. From around 1687, Schnitger increasingly used homophonic mixtures with multiple choirs and high Repetitions. The independent pedal division with long reeds provided a solid foundation for the accompaniment of the congregational singing.

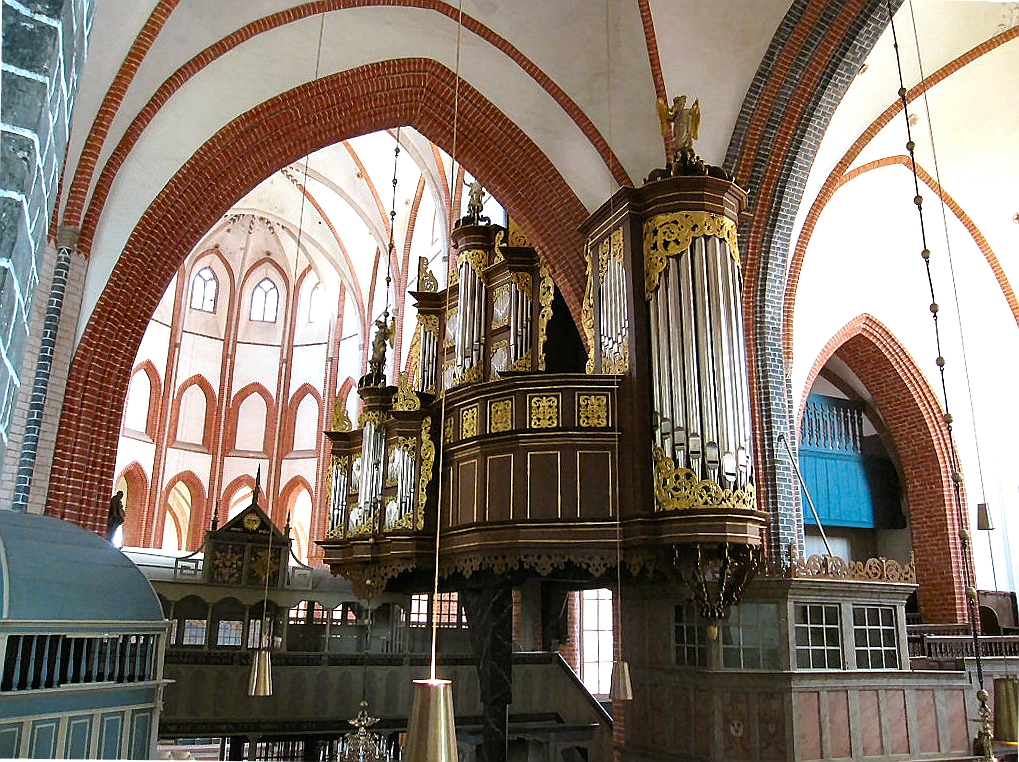
Schnitger organ in Norden

In the Norder Ludgeri-Kirche (1686-88/1691-92) contains Schnitger's Organ in the Jacobi church in Hamburg Schnitger's second largest surviving work in Germany. With 46 stops and five divisions on three manual keyboards and pedal, it is the second largest organ work in East Frisia. The Organ in Norden is historically and musically a work of art of international standing. Eight stops, which Schnitger took over from the previous organ (Edo Evers, 1618), are still preserved and are of particular quality. In addition to the contract, Schnitger added a Brustwerk with six stops and, in a second construction phase (1691-92), an Oberpositiv with eight stops, which was attached to the action of the Brustwerk and is therefore also played from the third manual. Architecturally ingenious is the construction of a single pedal tower around the south-eastern crossing pillar with the direction of sound into the nave in order to do justice to the difficult acoustic conditions. The restoration by Jürgen Ahrend (1981-85) consistently restored the old sound. In particular, his reconstruction of the principals and reed stops is considered masterful. The modified mean-tone tuning, which divides the pythagorean comma into five (instead of dividing the syntonic comma into four) and is known as the Norder tuning, leads to a great purity of sound and has since been used in other restorations and new builds.

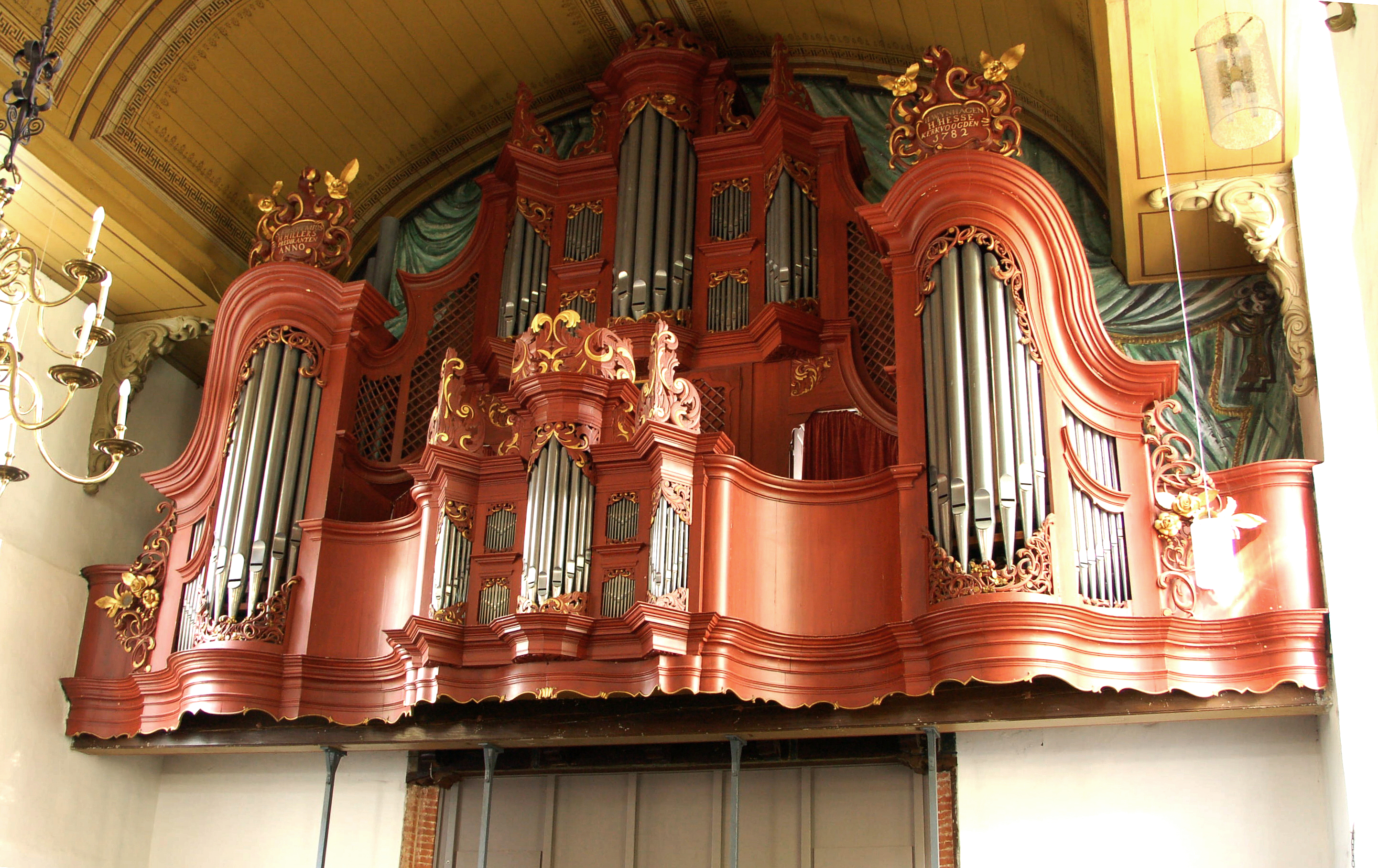
Schnitger organ in Weener

Due to numerous alterations, the Organ in Weener (1709-10) now only has six stops by Schnitger. The instrument took on its present form in 1782 when Johann Friedrich Wenthin placed the organ on a new gallery in front of the choir and added pedal towers to the sides. The organ in Weener is the last example of free-standing pedal towers. The external appearance is unusual due to the strict Schnitgerian design of the two manual divisions on the one hand and the curved pedal towers and the Rococo style gallery balustrade, which was created at the same time, on the other. In the Lutherkirche Leer and in Wittmund, St. Nicolai, Schnitger's two-manual organs were completely replaced by new organs by Hinrich Just Müller towards the end of the 18th century due to the changing tastes of the time.

==== Schnitger School ====
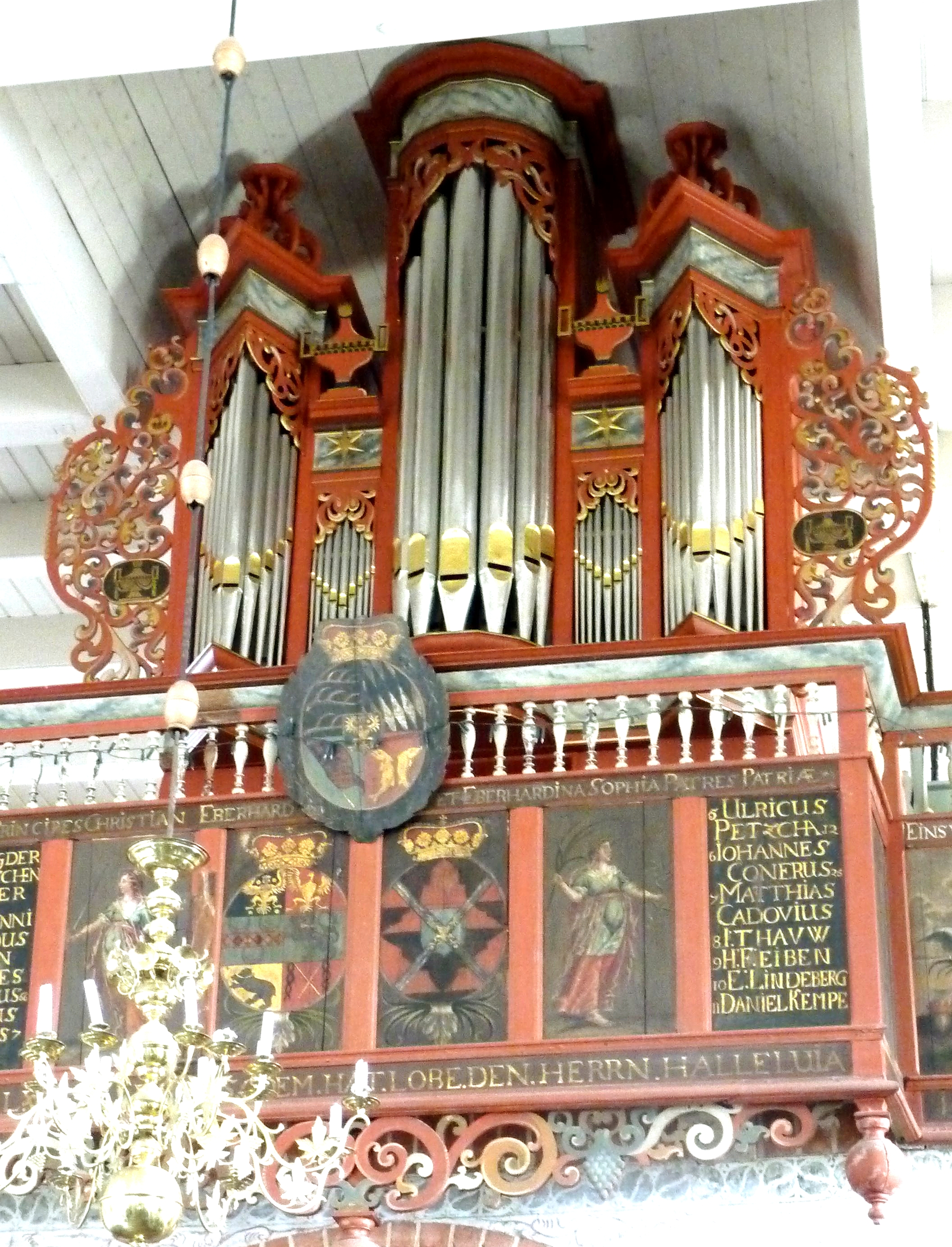
Richborn organ in Buttforde

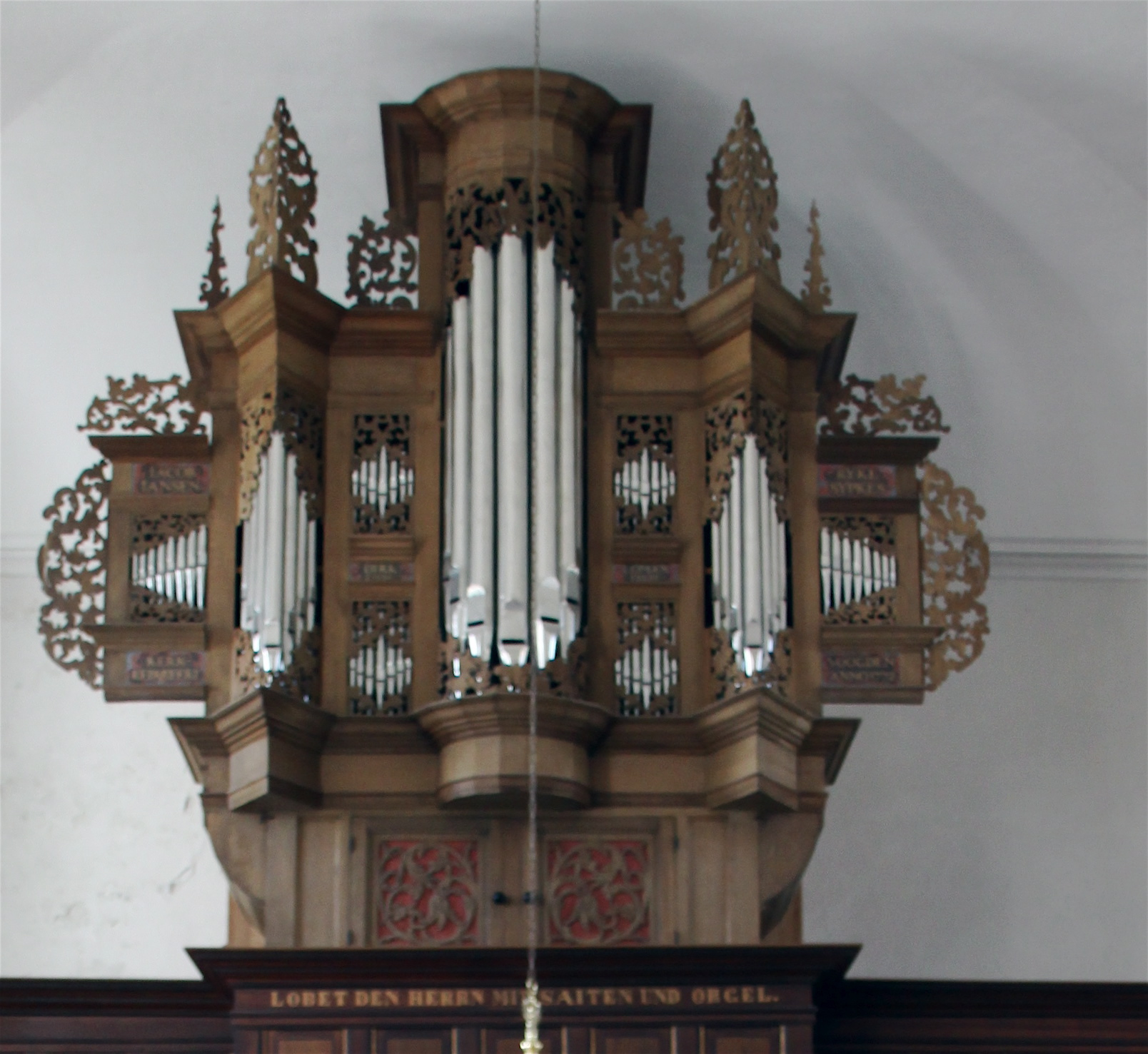
Grotian organ in Pilsum

At the same time, the Aurich-born Schnitger pupil Gerhard von Holy built the instruments in Dornum and in Marienhafe. The Dornum organ (1710-11) is one of the largest village organs in northern Germany and the third largest historical organ in East Frisia. The four original wooden flutes and the rich possibilities for plenum registrations are particularly characteristic of its sound. The Organ in Marienhafe (1711-13) is the best and most completely preserved baroque organ in East Frisia. Even the principals in the façade, all the aliquot stops and the mixtures have remained intact over the centuries. The original voicing has also remained largely untouched. The rich carvings are striking. As the instrument is entirely in the tradition of the Schnitger school in terms of construction and sound, it was long thought to be a work by Arp Schnitger. However, the colorful flute stops already point to the sound aesthetics of the 18th century. The large number of possible plenum registrations can be explained, as with the Schnitger organ in Norden, by the fact that the instrument was designed to accompany congregational singing. The flexible wind of the original wind system also serves this purpose. Ab 1723 wirkte von Holy in Westfalen.

Albertus Antonius Hinsz married the widow of Franz Caspar Schnitger and took over the Schnitger workshop in Groningen. The only major organ project Hinsz carried out outside the Netherlands was the extension of the Great Church in Leer (1763-66), which amounted to a new building. His cost estimate for the new organ in the Great Church in Emden (1747) was not accepted. Matthias Amoor from Groningen can also be found working in East Frisia on several occasions. For example, he replaced the Gothic double doors of the Rysum organ with carved ears, giving the instrument a Baroque appearance.

==== Independent East Frisian organ builders ====
Joachim Richborn, the most important Hamburg organ builder from Schnitger's time, whose field of work extended as far as Scandinavia, built organs in Berdum (1677) and Buttforde (1681). The Organ in Buttforde is almost completely intact and is one of the most valuable organs in the region. Due to the height required for the Principal 8′, a recess had to be made in the wooden ceiling above the organ, which was too low, so that the instrument could stand on the rood screen. This is a rare case in which even the original voicing with its vocal tone coloration has been largely preserved and has hardly any Core stitches. This unaltered original condition is almost unparalleled for the 17th century, particularly in the case of the Principal in the façade.

The same applies to the Masterpiece in Pilsum (1694), which was built by Aurich organ builder Valentin Ulrich Grotian. Grotian's pipes have a higher lead content and are less finely crafted than Schnitger's. In addition to the principal chorus, there is an independent flute chorus in the upper division. The lateral blind wings fulfill a decorative function and contain mute pipes. Other works by Grotian can be found in Petkum (1694-99), Bensersiel (1696) and Stedesdorf (1696). It was only in East Frisia and Jeverland that Grotian and Joachim Kayser were able to distinguish themselves for a time with independent works alongside their contemporary Arp Schnitger. Schnitger endeavored to extend his organ building privileges in the northwest German coastal region and did not tolerate any competition. By Joachim Kayser (Jever), who built, rebuilt or repaired various organs in East Frisia, only in Eilsum (1710) are the façade and the case.

One of his twelve new organs was built by Johann Friedrich Constabel from Wittmund, who was also active in the neighboring Jeverland, only one instrument has survived. Originally built for Bargebur in 1738, it stood in Hamswehrum from 1864-1967 before being transferred to its current location in Jennelt. Its organ in Greetsiel (1738) fell victim to a new building in 1914, so that only the original case remains. In 1760, Constabel began a new building in Funnix; however, it was completed in 1762 by Hinrich Just Müller, who continued Constabel's workshop.

=== Late Baroque and early Classicism ===
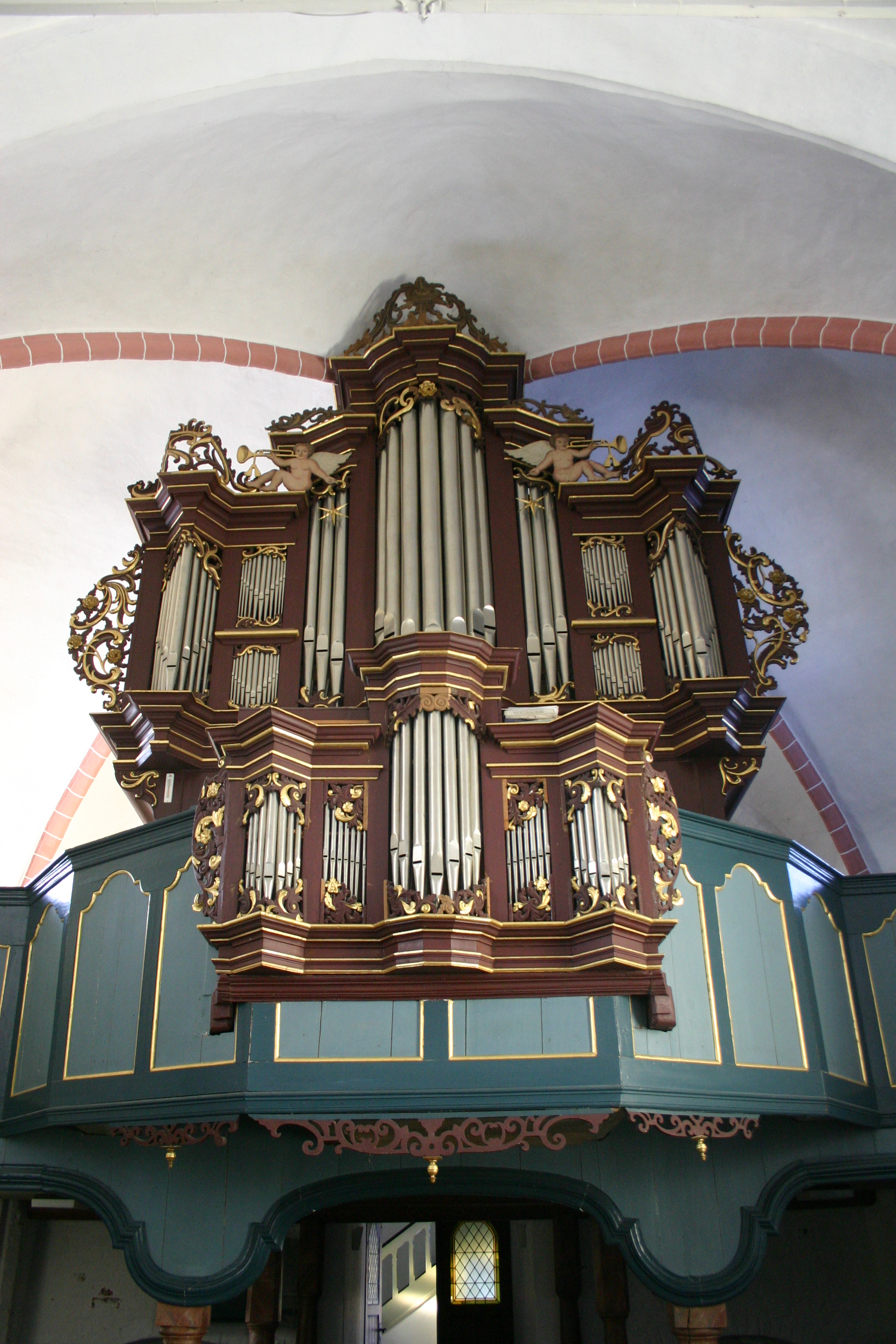
Müller organ in Remels

From the second half of the 18th century onwards, the region once again experienced an economic boom, which also provided organ builders from abroad with a large field of activity. Even relatively small village churches acquired representative organs.

In the course of the 18th century, a Westphalian influence on East Frisian organ building can be discerned on various occasions, as a result of which Schnitger's architectural style was finally completely displaced. Externally, this new stylistic influence can be seen in the many small pipe fields, which are increasingly stepped to the sides around the large central tower. In contrast to Schnitger's five-part facade construction, which is generally based on a short octave and therefore requires fewer bass pipes, the Westphalian design meets the requirements of the fully developed bass octave. The rich carving in the pipe fields, the lateral ears and the crowning scrollwork on the organ case create a representative effect. In the second half of the 18th century in East Frisia, Hinrich Just Müller (Wittmund) and Johann Friedrich Wenthin (Emden) competed with numerous new organs and conversions. Von Müller, who came from the Osnabrücker Land and worked in over 50 parishes in East Frisia from 1760-1811, works are preserved in Midlum (1766), Holtrop (1772), Nortmoor (1773-75), Simonswolde (1777), Manslagt (1776-78), Carolinensiel (1780-81), Remels (1782), Middels (1784-86), Neermoor (1796-98) and Woquard (1802-04). Müller's high level of craftsmanship was combined with practical business acumen. Remels is home to the last East Frisian organ with a Rückpositiv. This tradition was only taken up again in historicizing new buildings in the second half of the 20th century.

Dirk Lohman from Emden, who carried out repairs on numerous East Frisian organs, was only entrusted with a new building in Hage (1776-83), for which he used some stops from the 17th century. In 1788, he moved to Groningen, where the family business was continued for four generations.

In addition to Müller, three other organ builders exerted a Westphalian influence on the organ landscape of East Frisia: Christian Klausing from Herford made the organ in Ochtersum from 1734 to 1737. Johann Adam Berner from Osnabrück built a small instrument in Pogum (1758-59) and was entrusted with rebuilding and repairing East Frisian organs. By Heinrich Wilhelm Eckmann, who was otherwise mainly active in the Osnabrücker Land, the organs in Amdorf (1773) and Bagband (1774-75) well preserved.

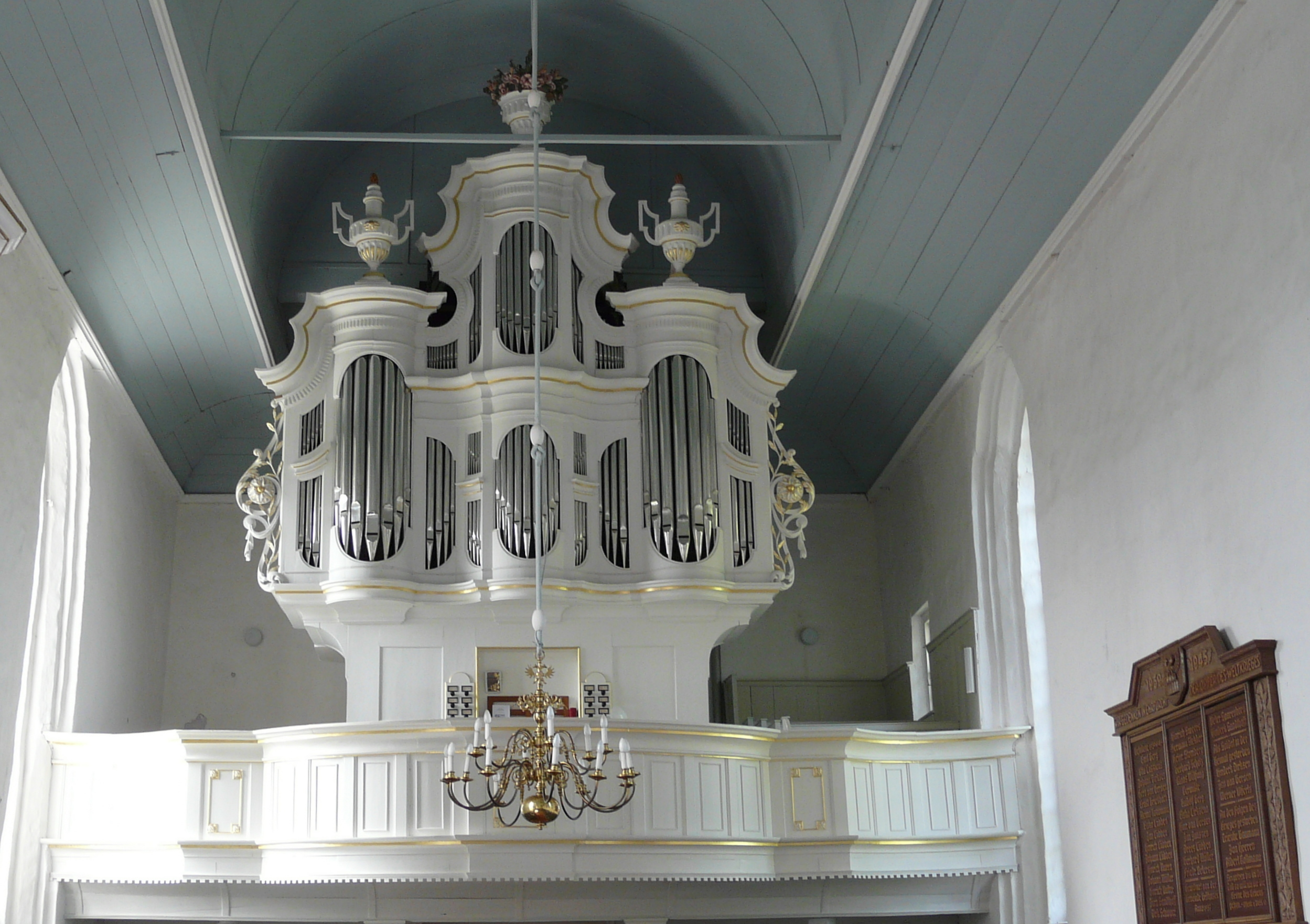
Wenthin-Orgel em Groothusen

Compared to Müller, Wenthin's ideal of sound was far more progressive and more strongly influenced by Rococo, in part already by Classicism. This can be seen visually in the curved facade shapes and lid vases on the case, and tonally in the novel stops and the use of equal temperament. Wenthin's organ in Groothusen (1798-1801) is the largest organ work in Krummhörn and, with its innovative sound concept and diverse sound shadings, an artistic monument of European standing. The delicate flute stops made of mahogany are unique, especially the traverso flute choir in eight-foot, four-foot and three-foot positions. The two Split stops are also unusual: the labial Cornet and the Vox angelica, a trumpet stop which is built as a two-foot stop in the bass and an eight-foot stop in the treble. Other organs by Wenthin, who worked in East Frisia from 1774-1805, can be found in Backemoor (1783), where the only original viola da gamba stop from the 18th century has been preserved, in Reepsholt (1788-89), in Wolthusen (1790-93) and Westerende (1793).

=== Classicism and Romanticism ===
After organ building in East Frisia in the 18th century was strongly influenced by organ builders who had traveled to the region, it was mainly East Frisian organ building families who emerged in the 19th century. They initially continued the previous organ building traditions, but added the characteristics of Romanticism to them. These included the two-dimensional compound façade, which was already emerging as a trend in the 18th century and replaced the traditional working principle. In the disposition, fundamental stops in the eight-foot position were increasingly used, while reed stops and mixed voices were in decline. The fact that they continued to be used is due to the strong congregational singing in the region to this day. Swells were not built in the 19th century, just as a distinct Romantic phase cannot be discerned. After a flourishing organ culture over a period of 500 years, the level of organ building in East Frisia reached its lowest point in the last third of the 19th century until the middle of the 20th century, which was partly due to the deteriorating economic conditions. As the region eventually became impoverished, the churches did not have sufficient funds to purchase more modern instruments, so the old organs were mostly preserved. In the first half of the 20th century, organ builders were mainly occupied with maintenance and care work and minor rebuilding measures.

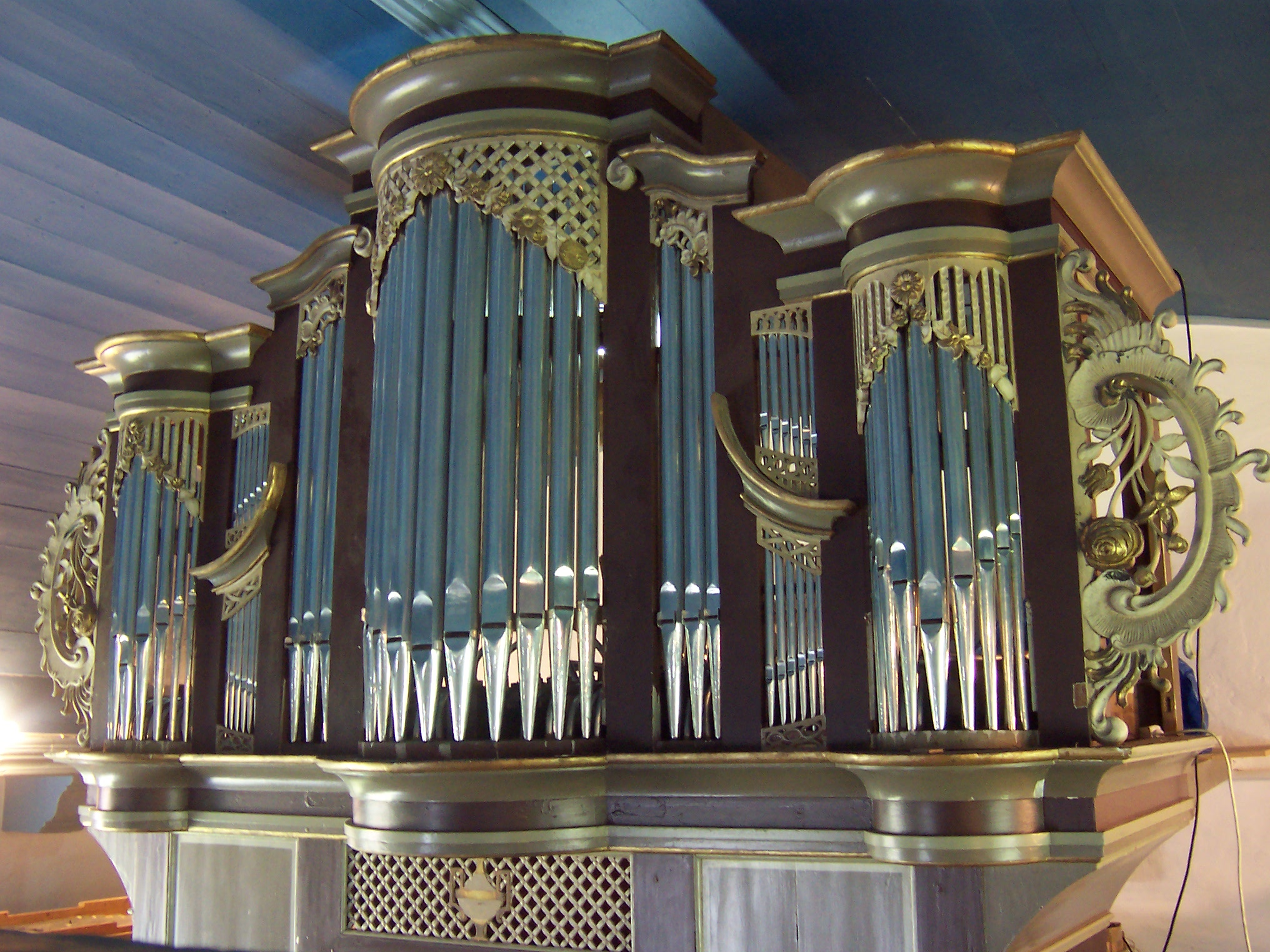
Rohlfs-Orgel em Collinghorst

The most influential East Frisian organ builder in the first half of the 19th century was Müller's pupil Johann Gottfried Rohlfs (Esens), who was active in almost 60 communities in East Frisia and founded a family business with three generations. New buildings by him are still preserved in Bangstede (1794-95), the Christuskirche Norden (1796-97), Neustadtgödens (1796-98), Barstede (1801), Veenhusen (1801-02), Holtland (1810-13), Nüttermoor (1815-16), Wiesens (1820–22), Böhmerwold (1828), Roggenstede (1827-33) and Collinghorst (1838). His works have colorful sounds and are indebted to the example of his teacher. Like his father, his son Arnold Rohlfs followed in this baroque organ tradition and built mainly small village organs with one manual and an attached pedal in the traditional manner until around 1860, although these were already characterized by various romantic elements. Arnold Rohlfs then developed his own organ style by designing instruments entirely without aliquot stops and mixtures. His largest work with 30 stops can be found in the Magnuskirche in his home town of Esens (1848-60) and has been preserved almost unchanged. It is also the largest organ in East Frisia from the 19th century. Other organs from his workshop, which have remained largely unchanged, can be found in Westerholt (1841-42), Siegelsum (1842-45), Fulkum (1860-66) and Holtgaste (1864-65).

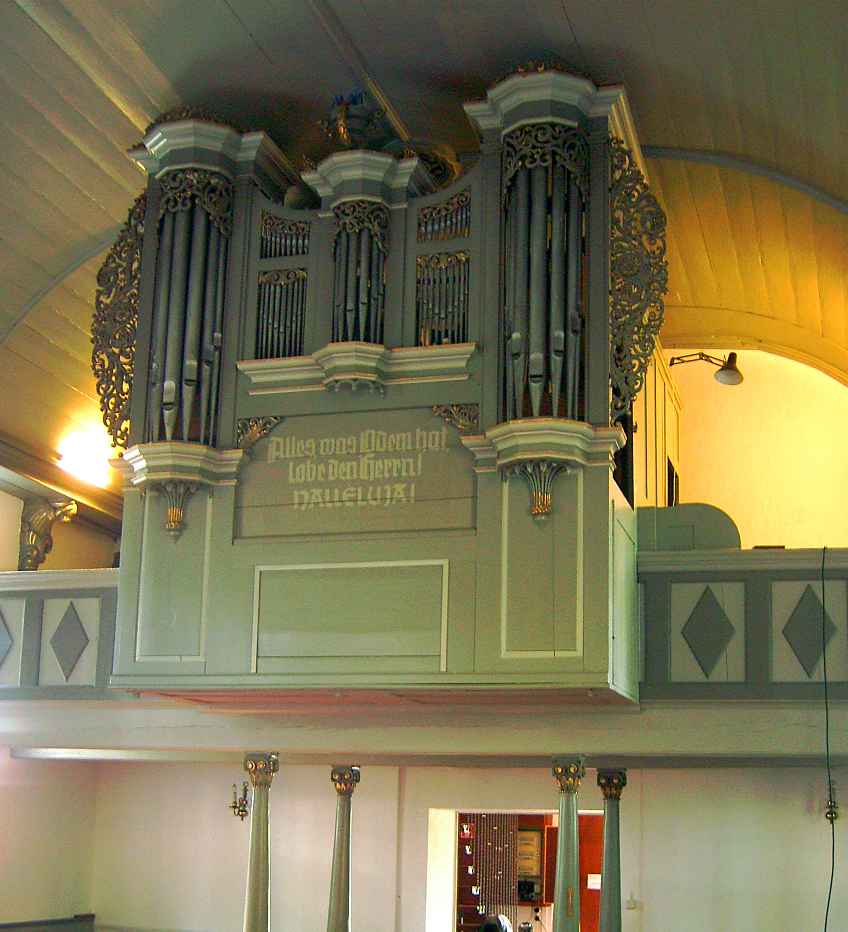
Janssen Organ in Grotegaste

In addition to Rohlfs, the family businesses of Gerd Sieben Janssen and Wilhelm Eilert Schmid were active in East Frisia, but they were no longer able to maintain the level of Müller and Wenthin. Janssen (Aurich) learned organ building from Johann Gottfried Rohlfs and was in continuity with the baroque principles of organ building. As Janssen reused some old stops from the previous organ by Johannes Millensis (1618-19) when rebuilding the Larrelter organ, these were preserved and still allow the original Renaissance sounds to be heard. Schmid built almost exclusively smaller, single-manual village organs and was otherwise mainly active in the maintenance and rebuilding of organs. The various lines of the Schmid family of organ builders were partly active for several generations in East Frisia, the Oldenburg region and the Osnabrück region.

Wilhelm Caspar Joseph Höffgen was in the tradition of Wenthin in Emden, but only created two new instruments. His instrument in Emden-Uphusen (1836-39) features Italian elements with the mixture divided into individual stops. Like his small work in Freepsum, it is almost completely preserved. The last East Frisian organ builder to make an appearance was Johann Diepenbrock; he created in Wymeer (1888) and Werdum (1897-98) works with mechanical cone chest. While most of his organ cases are Neo-Gothic in design, the five-part façade in Werdum is based in a historicizing manner on the predecessor organ by Valentin Ulrich Grotian (around 1690).

=== 20th and 21st century ===
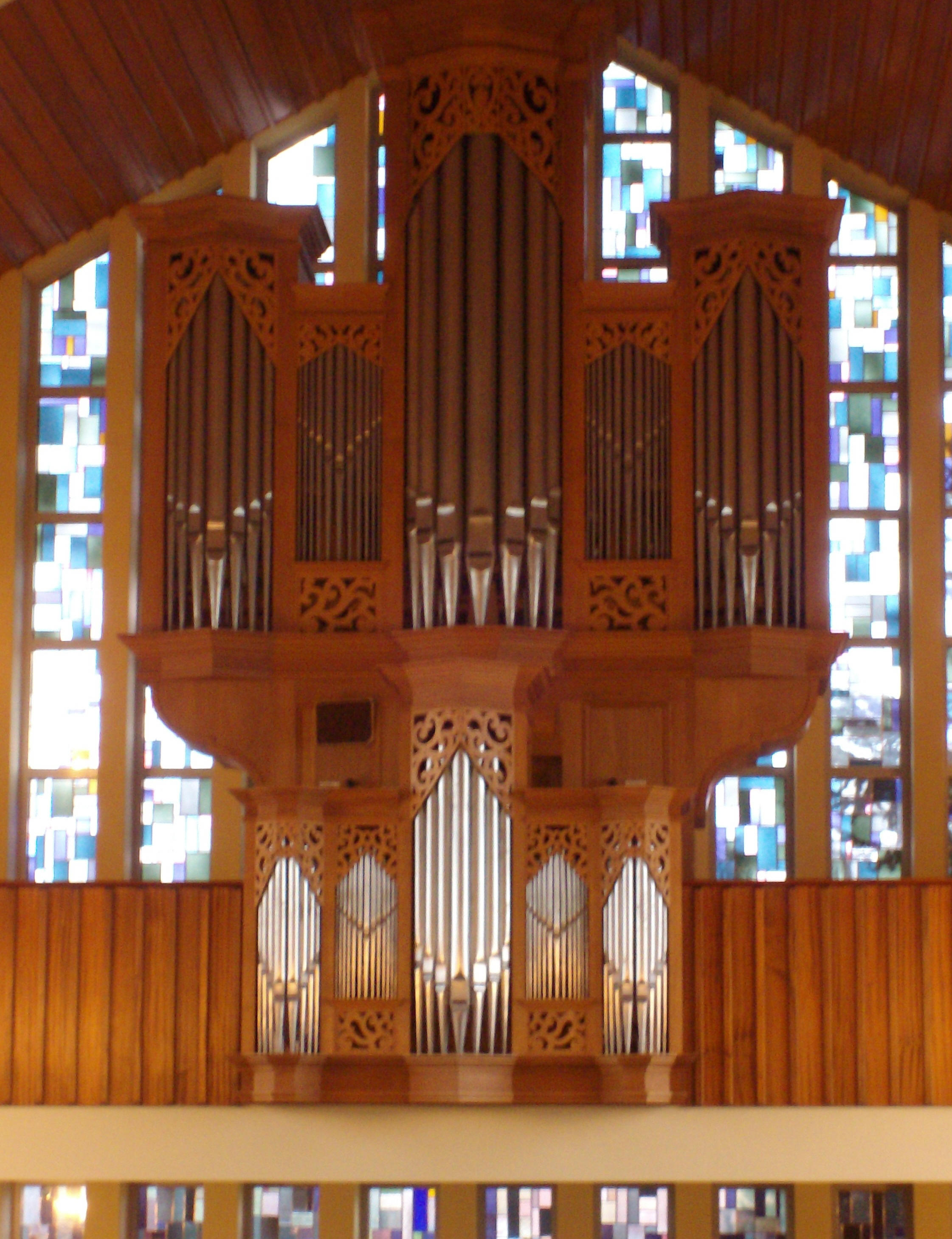
Führer organ in Bunde (Altref. Church)

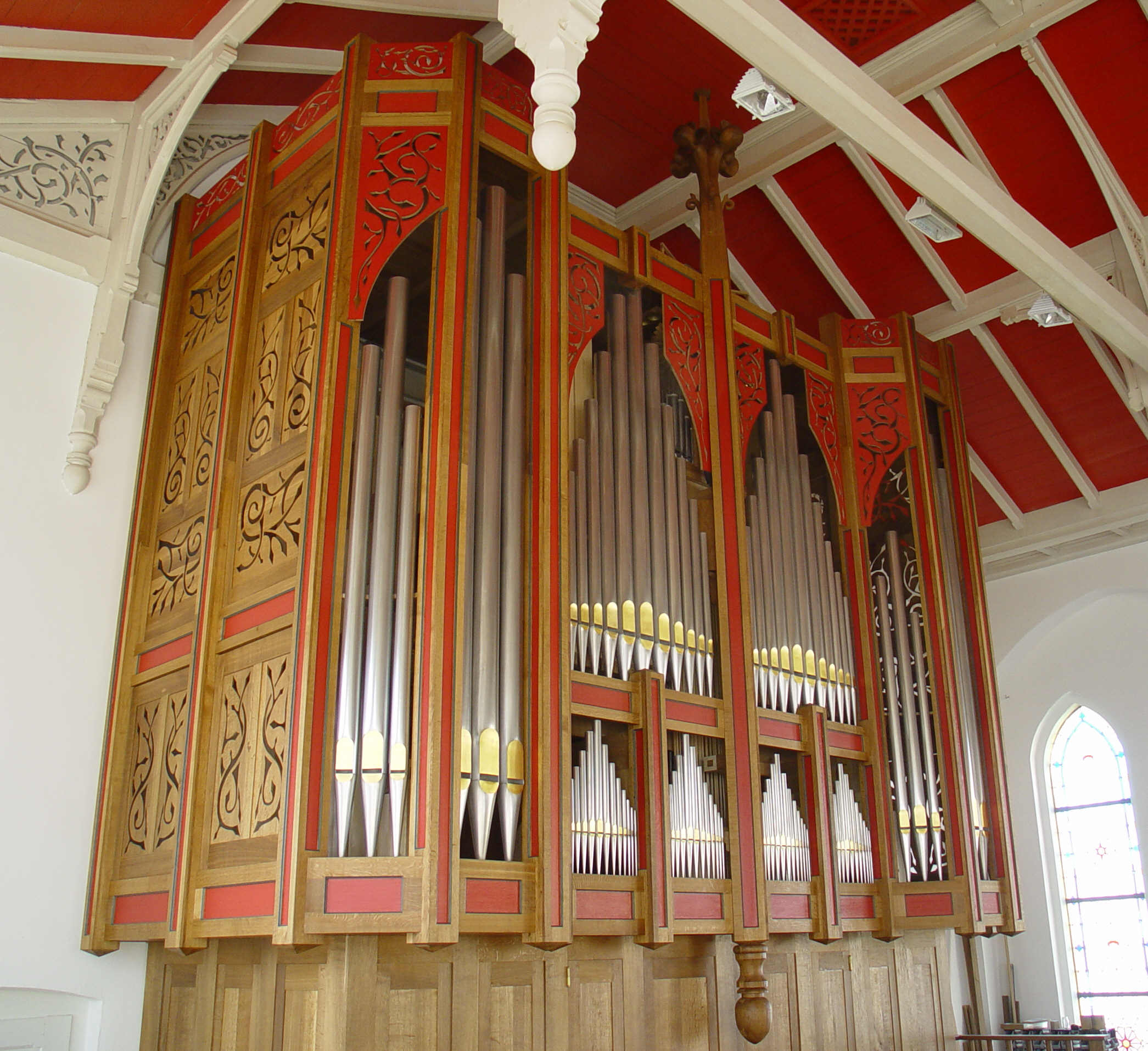
Kirschner organ of the Protestant island church on Norderney

In the first half of the 20th century, East Frisia no longer had any independent organ workshops. Instead, individuals such as Max Maucher and Karl Puchar carried out maintenance and minor modernizations. Industrial organ building, which predominantly built pneumatic organs, remained without much influence. Pneumatic organs, such as those in the Norder Mennonitenkirche (1900), in Weenermoor (1906) and Etzel (1928) were the exception in East Frisia. Some larger pneumatic works in Aurich and Leer did not survive or were destroyed, such as the organ work by Friedrich Klassmeier in the Great Church in Emden (1927), which with 51 stops was the largest organ in East Frisia for 16 years, was destroyed in World War II. At the beginning of the 20th century, the organ movement received important impulses from the rich stock of historical organs in northwest Germany. The Schnitger organ in Norden played an important role here; it was one of the first organs to be placed under listed building protection on the initiative of Christhard Mahrenholz.

The work of the leading organ builder Jürgen Ahrend, who set up his own business in Leer-Loga in 1954 and formed a cooperative with Gerhard Brunzema until 1971, can hardly be overestimated. His exemplary restorations and new buildings have attracted worldwide attention and, in organ building, in many cases brought about a return to the traditional principles of craftsmanship and the classical sound ideals of organ building. Influential new buildings by Ahrend (and Brunzema) can be found, for example, in the Lambertikirche Aurich (1960-61) and the Lutherkirche Leer (2002). Since 2005, the company has been run by his son Hendrik Ahrend. Five other organ builders operate their workshops in East Frisia, but are also active beyond the region: Bartelt Immer (Norden), Regina Stegemann (Tannenhausen), Jürgen Kopp (Emden/Tannenhausen), Martin ter Haseborg (Uplengen) and Harm Dieder Kirschner (Stapelmoor). The Alfred Führer company Wilhelmshaven has also been involved in the preservation and restoration of historical organs in East Frisia. (Wilhelmshaven), which has also built widely acclaimed new organs, such as the Organ in Bunde (1980). After the company went bankrupt, former employees founded the Ostfriesischer Orgelservice (Wiesmoor), which concentrates on repair and maintenance services.

The organ landscape is complemented by the faithful replica of the Louis-Alexandre-Clicquot organ (Houdan, 1734) in Stapelmoor (1997), the first organ in Germany in a consistently Baroque-French style, and an English organ by Joseph William Walker (1844), which has been in Jemgum since 2007. New three-manual organs with a swell for late Romantic and French symphonic music can be found in the Martin Luther Church in Emden Martin Luther Church (Rudolf von Beckerath, 1995) and in the Evangelical Island Church on Norderney (Kirschner, 2008).

== Development for the public ==
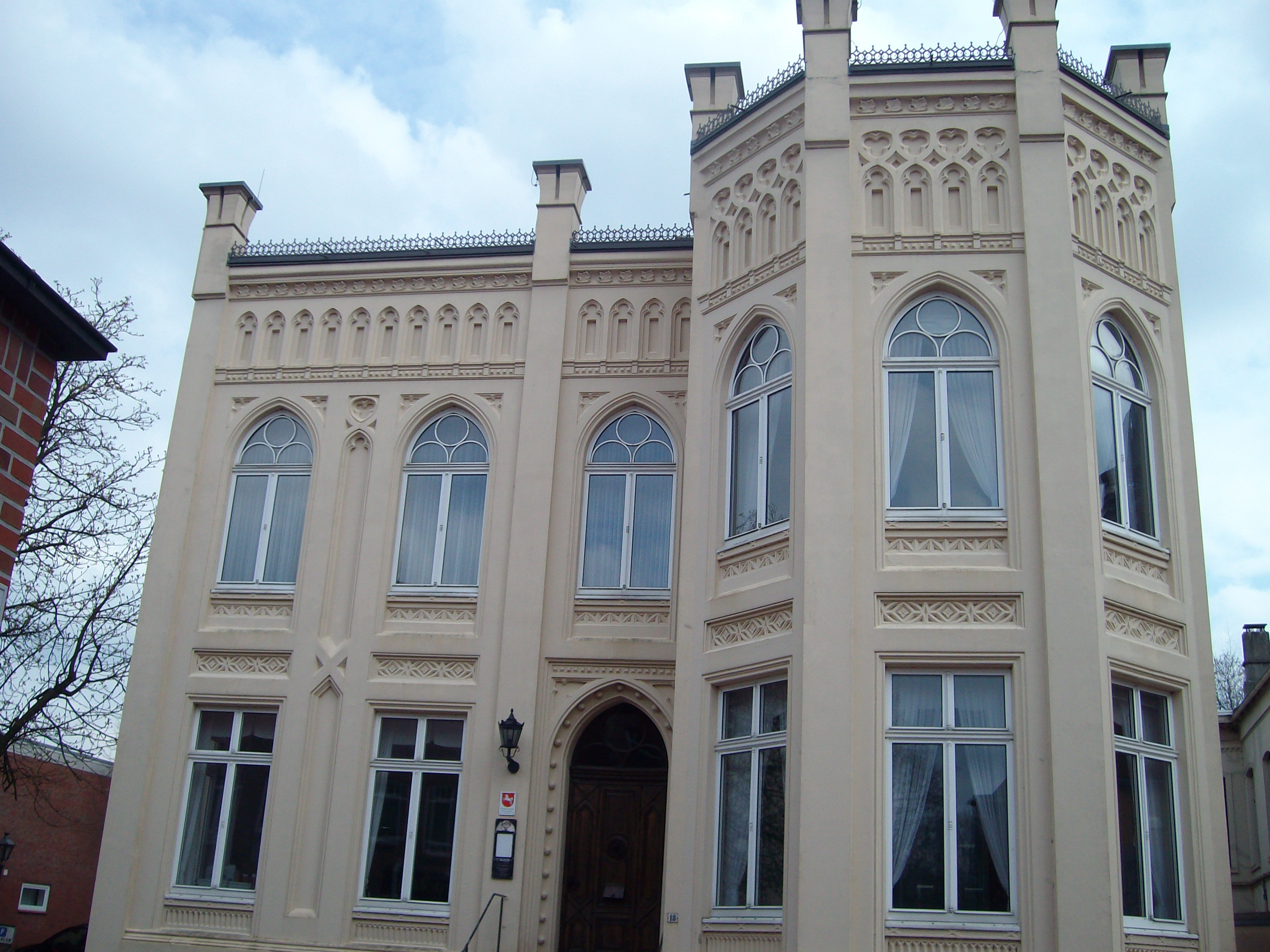
Organeum in Weener

The Dollart Festival (1981-2003) and the work of the "Norddeutsche Orgelakademie" (North German Organ Academy) provided significant impetus for the promotion of the organ landscape (from 1977 in Bunderhee, today in connection with the Hochschule für Künste Bremen), both of which were founded by Harald Vogel were founded and directed. Vogel's radio and CD recordings as well as his publishing activities have made the East Frisian organs known and attracted organists and organ builders from all over the world. His international master classes had a multiplier effect with the concept of presenting organ literature from the Gothic, Renaissance and Baroque periods on the respective original instruments in historical playing style (with old fingerings). Today, the Organeum with the East Frisian Organ Academy in Weener under the direction of Winfried Dahlke is the most important organ center for the research and promotion of regional organ culture and, in addition to concerts, also offers organ excursions and the opportunity for scientific organologische research.

Every year, concert series are held in the St. Ludgeri Church in Norden, the Luther Church and the Great Church in Leer, the St. George's Church Weener and in Dornum. The Krummhörner Orgelfrühling has been established since 2001. Also as part of the nationally renowned festival Musikalischer Sommer in Ostfriesland (since 1985) organ concerts take place.

== Literature ==
- Winfried Dahlke (2020), "Orgelland Ostfriesland", Klangjuwelen, vol. 2, pp. 23–30
- Cornelius H. Edskes (1978), "Der Orgelbau im Ems-Dollart-Gebiet in Gotik und Renaissance", Ostfriesland. Zeitschrift für Kultur, Wirtschaft und Verkehr, no. 2, pp. 29–33
- Cornelius H. Edskes (1978), "Orgelbau in Ostfriesland heute", Ostfriesland. Zeitschrift für Kultur, Wirtschaft und Verkehr, no. 2, pp. 33–34
- Walter Kaufmann (1968), Die Orgeln Ostfrieslands, Aurich: Ostfriesische Landschaft
- Walter Kaufmann (1974), "Oldenburg - East Frisia. On the occasion of the twenty-second International Organ Conference from July 29 to August 3, 1974", Ars Organi, vol. 22, no. 44, pp. 1952–1958
- Uda von der Nahmer (2008), Wind singing. Organs, wind and relatives, Aurich: Ostfriesische Landschaftliche Verlags- und Vertriebsgesellschaft, ISBN 978-3-940601-03-2
- Ralph Nickles (1995), Orgelinventar der Krummhörn und der Stadt Emden, Bremen: Hauschild Verlag, ISBN 3-929902-62-1
- Ibo Ortgies: Die Praxis der Orgelstimmung in Norddeutschland im 17. und 18. Jahrhundert und ihr Verhältnis zur zeitgenössischen Musikpraxis. Göteborgs universitet, Göteborg 2007
- Ibo Ortgies (1988), "Von den alten Orgeln: Die Orgellandschaft Ostfrieslands. Eine Einführung", Concerto, vol. 5, no. VI/7–8, pp. 12–18
- Fritz Schild: Orgelatlas der historischen und modernen Orgeln der Evangelisch-Lutherischen Kirche in Oldenburg. Noetzel, Wilhelmshaven 2008, ISBN 3-7959-0894-9
- Fritz Schild (2008), Orgelatlas der historischen und modernen Orgeln der Evangelisch-Lutherischen Kirche in Oldenburg, Wilhelmshaven: Noetzel, ISBN 978-3-7959-0894-2
- Harald Vogel, Günter Lade, Nicola Borger-Keweloh (1997), Orgeln in Niedersachsen, Bremen: Hauschild, ISBN 3-931785-50-5
- Harald Vogel, Reinhard Ruge, Robert Noah, Martin Stromann (1997), Orgellandschaft Ostfriesland (2. ed.), Norden: Soltau-Kurier-Norden, ISBN 3-928327-19-4
- Harald Vogel, Reinhard Ruge, Stef Tuinstra (1992), Wegweiser zu den Orgeln der Ems-Dollart-Region (2. ed.), Leer: Rautenberg

== Recordings/recording media ==
- Die Ahrend-Orgel der Lutherkirche zu Leer. 2005. Amb 96869 (Wolfgang Zerer)
- Dietrich Buxtehude: Orgelwerke. Vol. 5. 1993. MD+G L 3425 (Harald Vogel in Pilsum, Buttforde, Langwarden, Basedow, Groß Eichsen).
- Harald Vogel spielt 12 Orgeln in Ostfriesland. Edition Falkenberger. 2017, ISBN 978-3-95494-136-0 (Werke von C. Paumann, J.P. Sweelinck, H. Scheidemann, G. Böhm, C.P.E. Bach)
- Die Holy-Orgel der Marienkirche zu Marienhafe. 2001. Amb 97829 (Martin Böcker).
- Les plus belles orgues. 1994. Analekta Classics, AN 28216-7, 2 CD (Antoine Bouchard in Rysum, Osteel, Steinkirchen, Mittelnkirchen, Ganderkesee, Westerhusen, Dedesdorf).
- Orgelland Ostfriesland. 1989. Deutsche Harmonia Mundi, HM 939-2 (Harald Vogel in Norden, Uttum, Rysum, Westerhusen, Marienhafe, Weener).
- Orgellandschaften. Folge 4: Eine musikalische Reise zu acht Orgeln der Region Ostfriesland (Teil 1). 2013, NOMINE e. V., LC 18240 (Thiemo Janssen in Rysum, Osteel, Westerhusen, Marienhafe, Dornum und Agnes Luchterhandt in Uttum, Pilsum, Norden)
- Orgellandschaften. Folge 6: Eine musikalische Reise zu acht Orgeln der Region Ostfriesland (Teil 2). 2 CDs, 2016, NOMINE e. V. (Winfried Dahlke in Buttforde, Weener, Esens, Groothusen, Midlum, Böhmerwold, Manslagt, und Backemoor mit Werken von J.S. Bach, D. Buxtehude, G. Böhm, J.L. Krebs, J.A. Holzmann, C.P.E. Bach, F. Mendelssohn u. a.).
- Orgeln in Ostfriesland. Vol. 1. 1996. Organeum OC-09601 (Harald Vogel in Osteel, Buttforde, Neermoor, Veenhusen, Groothusen).
- Orgeln in Ostfriesland. Vol. 2. 1997. Organeum OC-09602 (Harald Vogel in Rysum, Uttum, Norden, Marienhafe).
- Orgels in de eems-dollard regio. Vol. 1. 1999. VLS VLC 0599 (Peter Westerbrink in Dornum).
- Orgels in de eems-dollard regio. Vol. 2. 2003. VLS VLC 0302 (Peter Westerbrink in Marienhafe).
- Vorbilder und Entwicklungen. Orgelmusik von Sweelinck bis Bach. 2006. Ambiente, ACD-1023 (Ingo Bredenbach in Hinte).
- Jacob Praetorius: Motets & Organ Works. 1996. CPO 999215-2 (Harald Vogel in Osteel).
- Thomas Tomkins: Complete Keyboard Music. Vol. 4. 1996. MD+G 6070706 (Bernhard Klapprott in Uttum).
- Diskografie der Schnitgerorgeln in Norden u. Weener
- Orgeln Ostfrieslands 1. 2005. Ostfriesland-Filme. DVD (History and sound examples of the organs in Norden, Rysum, Hage, Victorbur, Strackholt, Riepe, Hinte, Dornum, Westerholt and Groothusen)
