= Holtgast =

- Municipality
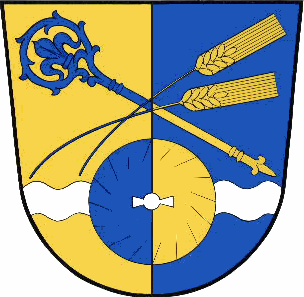
- Coat of arms

- Location of Holtgast within Wittmund district
- Interactive map of Holtgast
- Location within Germany Location within Lower Saxony
- Coordinates: 53°37′57″N 7°34′57″E
- Country: Germany
- State: Lower Saxony
- District: Wittmund
- Municipal assoc.: Esens
- Subdivisions: 4 Ortsteile

Government
  - Mayor: Gerhart Frerichs (FW)

Area
  - Total: 24 km^{2} (9.3 sq mi)
- Elevation: 2 m (6.6 ft)

Population (2025-12-31)
  - Total: 1,780
  - Density: 74/km^{2} (190/sq mi)
- Time zone: UTC+01:00 (CET)
  - Summer (DST): UTC+02:00 (CEST)
- Postal codes: 26427
- Dialling codes: 0 49 71
- Vehicle registration: WTM
- Website: www.holtgast.de

Holtgast is a municipality in the district of Wittmund, in Lower Saxony, Germany.
