= Utarp =

- Municipality
- Location of Utarp within Wittmund district
- Interactive map of Utarp
- Location within Germany Location within Lower Saxony
- Coordinates: 53°37′N 07°28′E
- Country: Germany
- State: Lower Saxony
- District: Wittmund
- Municipal assoc.: Holtriem

Government
  - Mayor: Harmine Bents (SPD)

Area
  - Total: 6.37 km^{2} (2.46 sq mi)
- Elevation: 2 m (6.6 ft)

Population (2025-12-31)
  - Total: 655
  - Density: 103/km^{2} (266/sq mi)
- Time zone: UTC+01:00 (CET)
  - Summer (DST): UTC+02:00 (CEST)
- Postal codes: 26556
- Dialling codes: 0 49 75
- Vehicle registration: WTM

Utarp is a municipality in the district of Wittmund, in Lower Saxony, Germany.
