= Eversmeer =

- Municipality
- Location of Eversmeer within Wittmund district
- Interactive map of Eversmeer
- Location within Germany Location within Lower Saxony
- Coordinates: 53°34′N 07°26′E
- Country: Germany
- State: Lower Saxony
- District: Wittmund
- Municipal assoc.: Holtriem

Government
  - Mayor: Egon Kunze (SPD)

Area
  - Total: 11.56 km^{2} (4.46 sq mi)
- Elevation: 8 m (26 ft)

Population (2025-12-31)
  - Total: 843
  - Density: 72.9/km^{2} (189/sq mi)
- Time zone: UTC+01:00 (CET)
  - Summer (DST): UTC+02:00 (CEST)
- Postal codes: 26556
- Dialling codes: 04975
- Vehicle registration: WTM
- Website: www.holtriem.de

Eversmeer is a municipality in the district of Wittmund, in Lower Saxony, Germany.
