= Neuharlingersiel =

- Municipality
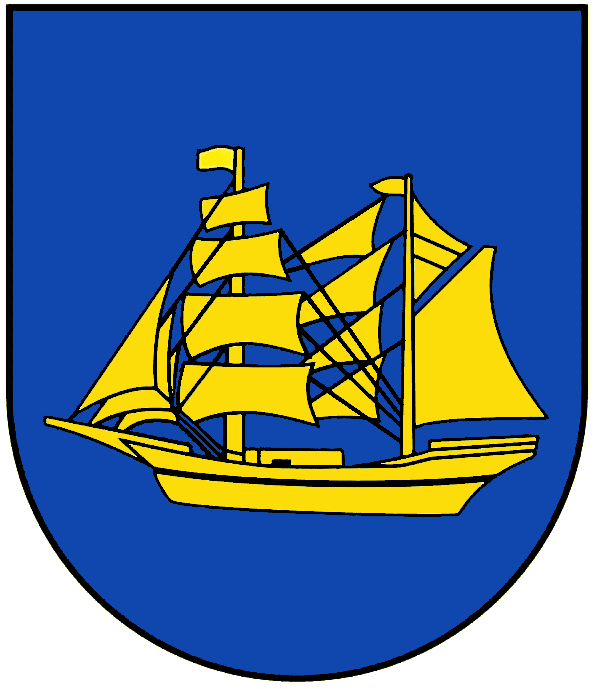
- Coat of arms

- Location of Neuharlingersiel within Wittmund district
- Interactive map of Neuharlingersiel
- Location within Germany Location within Lower Saxony
- Coordinates: 53°42′N 7°42′E
- Country: Germany
- State: Lower Saxony
- District: Wittmund
- Municipal assoc.: Esens
- Subdivisions: 4 Ortsteile

Government
  - Mayor: Jürgen Peters

Area
  - Total: 24.55 km^{2} (9.48 sq mi)
- Elevation: 1 m (3.3 ft)

Population (2025-12-31)
  - Total: 975
  - Density: 39.7/km^{2} (103/sq mi)
- Time zone: UTC+01:00 (CET)
  - Summer (DST): UTC+02:00 (CEST)
- Postal codes: 26427
- Dialling codes: 04974
- Vehicle registration: WTM
- Website: www.neuharlingersiel.de

Neuharlingersiel is a municipality in the district of Wittmund, in Lower Saxony, Germany. Neuharlingersiel is a small bucolic fishing village popular with artists. It is the setting of the German TV series Doktor Martin the German version of the British Doc Martin series.

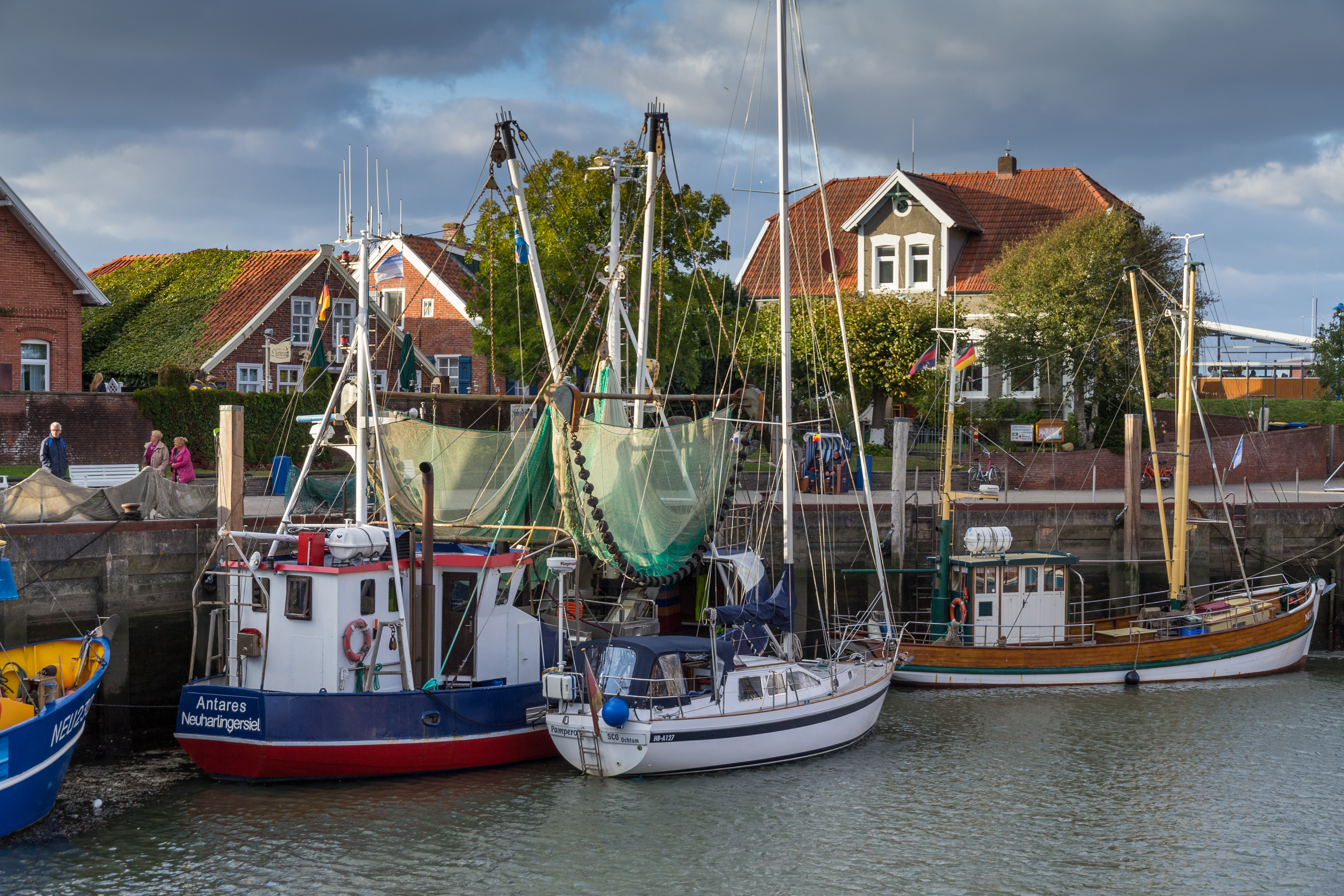
Neuharlingersiel, Am Hafen West

In Germany, Doktor Martin an adaptation of the original series, airs on ZDF with Axel Milberg as Doktor Martin Helling, a surgeon from Berlin. The counterpart of Portwenn was the real existing village of Neuharlingersiel in East Frisia.
