= Esens (Samtgemeinde) =

- Samtgemeinde
- Location of Esens within Wittmund district
- Interactive map of Esens
- Location within Germany Location within Lower Saxony
- Coordinates: 53°40′N 7°36′E
- Country: Germany
- State: Lower Saxony
- District: Wittmund
- Seat: Esens
- Subdivisions: 7 municipalities

Area
  - Total: 162.1 km^{2} (62.6 sq mi)

Population (2025-12-31)
  - Total: 14,094
  - Density: 86.95/km^{2} (225.2/sq mi)
- Time zone: UTC+01:00 (CET)
  - Summer (DST): UTC+02:00 (CEST)
- Website: www.samtgemeinde-esens.de

Esens is a Samtgemeinde ("collective municipality") in the district of Wittmund, in Lower Saxony, Germany. Its seat is in the town Esens. Its area is 162.1 square kilometers and has a population of around 14,400.

The Samtgemeinde Esens consists of the following municipalities:

1. Dunum
2. Esens
3. Holtgast
4. Moorweg
5. Neuharlingersiel
6. Stedesdorf
7. Werdum
