= Blomberg, Lower Saxony =

Blomberg
- Municipality
- Location of Blomberg within Wittmund district
- Interactive map of Blomberg
- Location within Germany Location within Lower Saxony
- Coordinates: 53°34′33″N 07°33′30″E
- Country: Germany
- State: Lower Saxony
- District: Wittmund
- Municipal assoc.: Holtriem

Government
  - Mayor: Irmgard Willms (FW)

Area
  - Total: 12.8 km^{2} (4.9 sq mi)
- Elevation: 7 m (23 ft)

Population (2025-12-31)
  - Total: 1,842
  - Density: 144/km^{2} (373/sq mi)
- Time zone: UTC+01:00 (CET)
  - Summer (DST): UTC+02:00 (CEST)
- Postal codes: 26487
- Dialling codes: 0 49 77
- Vehicle registration: WTM

Blomberg (German pronunciation: [ˈblɔmbɛʁk]) is a municipality in the district of Wittmund, in Lower Saxony, Germany.
