= Holtriem =

Samtgemeinde in Lower Saxony

- Samtgemeinde
- Location of Holtriem within Wittmund district
- Interactive map of Holtriem
- Location within Germany Location within Lower Saxony
- Coordinates: 53°36′N 7°27′E
- Country: Germany
- State: Lower Saxony
- District: Wittmund
- Seat: Westerholt
- Subdivisions: 8 municipalities

Area
  - Total: 82.95 km^{2} (32.03 sq mi)

Population (2025-12-31)
  - Total: 9,612
  - Density: 115.9/km^{2} (300.1/sq mi)
- Time zone: UTC+01:00 (CET)
  - Summer (DST): UTC+02:00 (CEST)
- Website: www.holtriem.de

Holtriem is a Samtgemeinde ("collective municipality") in the district of Wittmund, in Lower Saxony, Germany. It is situated near the North Sea coast, approx. 20 km west of Wittmund, and 13 km north of Aurich. Its seat is in the village Westerholt.

The Samtgemeinde Holtriem consists of the following municipalities:

1. Blomberg
2. Eversmeer
3. Nenndorf
4. Neuschoo
5. Ochtersum
6. Schweindorf
7. Utarp
8. Westerholt
