= Westerholt =

- Municipality
- Location of Westerholt within Wittmund district
- Interactive map of Westerholt
- Location within Germany Location within Lower Saxony
- Coordinates: 53°35′32″N 07°27′33″E
- Country: Germany
- State: Lower Saxony
- District: Wittmund
- Municipal assoc.: Holtriem

Government
  - Mayor: Eilert J. Eilers (SPD)

Area
  - Total: 14.63 km^{2} (5.65 sq mi)
- Elevation: 3 m (9.8 ft)

Population (2025-12-31)
  - Total: 2,618
  - Density: 178.9/km^{2} (463.5/sq mi)
- Time zone: UTC+01:00 (CET)
  - Summer (DST): UTC+02:00 (CEST)
- Postal codes: 26556
- Dialling codes: 0 49 75
- Vehicle registration: WTM
- Website: www.holtriem.de

Westerholt is a municipality in the district of Wittmund, in Lower Saxony, Germany.
