= Schweindorf =

- Municipality
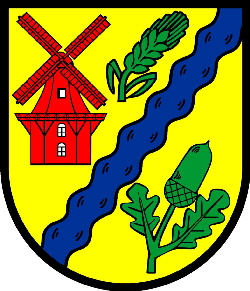
- Coat of arms

- Location of Schweindorf within Wittmund district
- Interactive map of Schweindorf
- Location within Germany Location within Lower Saxony
- Coordinates: 53°36′N 7°28′E
- Country: Germany
- State: Lower Saxony
- District: Wittmund
- Municipal assoc.: Holtriem

Government
  - Mayor: Birgit Siebels-Janßen

Area
  - Total: 5.44 km^{2} (2.10 sq mi)
- Elevation: 5 m (16 ft)

Population (2025-12-31)
  - Total: 732
  - Density: 135/km^{2} (349/sq mi)
- Time zone: UTC+01:00 (CET)
  - Summer (DST): UTC+02:00 (CEST)
- Postal codes: 26556
- Dialling codes: 0 49 75
- Vehicle registration: WTM

Schweindorf is a municipality in the district of Wittmund, in Lower Saxony, Germany.
