= Doktor Martin (German TV series) =

- Starring: Axel Milberg; Ellen Schwiers
- Country of origin: Germany
- No. of seasons: 2
- No. of episodes: 14

Production
- Running time: 45 Minutes

Original release
- Network: ZDF
- Release: 25 July 2007 – 2009

Doktor Martin is a German television comedy drama series produced by production company Phoenix Film for the German television channel ZDF. The first series was broadcast in July 2007, the second in July 2009.

The series is an adaptation of the British television series Doc Martin, which is broadcast on the British television channel ITV.

== Synopsis ==
Axel Milberg plays Dr. Martin Helling, a vascular surgeon from Berlin who hangs up his job because of a phobia of blood, so he moves to the East Frisian village of Neuharlingersiel for a new beginning. However, everything is very different from his city life; there is no hassle in the practice, patients prefer to stay for a cup of tea. The comedy of the series is mostly centred on the peculiarities of the villagers.

== See also ==
- List of German television series
