= Nenndorf =

- Municipality
- Location of Nenndorf within Wittmund district
- Interactive map of Nenndorf
- Location within Germany Location within Lower Saxony
- Coordinates: 53°34′N 07°34′E
- Country: Germany
- State: Lower Saxony
- District: Wittmund
- Municipal assoc.: Holtriem

Government
  - Mayor: Erwin Niehuisen

Area
  - Total: 6.86 km^{2} (2.65 sq mi)
- Elevation: 6 m (20 ft)

Population (2025-12-31)
  - Total: 762
  - Density: 111/km^{2} (288/sq mi)
- Time zone: UTC+01:00 (CET)
  - Summer (DST): UTC+02:00 (CEST)
- Postal codes: 26556
- Dialling codes: 0 49 75
- Vehicle registration: WTM

Nenndorf is a municipality in the district of Wittmund, in Lower Saxony, Germany.
