= Neuschoo =

- Municipality
- Location of Neuschoo within Wittmund district
- Interactive map of Neuschoo
- Location within Germany Location within Lower Saxony
- Coordinates: 53°34′N 07°30′E
- Country: Germany
- State: Lower Saxony
- District: Wittmund
- Municipal assoc.: Holtriem

Government
  - Mayor: Theodor Storck (SPD)

Area
  - Total: 14.47 km^{2} (5.59 sq mi)
- Elevation: 6 m (20 ft)

Population (2025-12-31)
  - Total: 1,226
  - Density: 84.73/km^{2} (219.4/sq mi)
- Time zone: UTC+01:00 (CET)
  - Summer (DST): UTC+02:00 (CEST)
- Postal codes: 26487
- Dialling codes: 04975, 04977
- Vehicle registration: WTM

Neuschoo is a municipality in the district of Wittmund, in Lower Saxony, Germany.
