= Dunum, Lower Saxony =

- Municipality
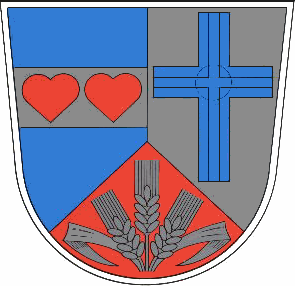
- Coat of arms

- Location of Dunum, Lower Saxony within Wittmund district
- Interactive map of Dunum, Lower Saxony
- Location within Germany Location within Lower Saxony
- Coordinates: 53°36′N 07°39′E
- Country: Germany
- State: Lower Saxony
- District: Wittmund
- Municipal assoc.: Esens

Government
  - Mayor: Reinhard Reents

Area
  - Total: 26.83 km^{2} (10.36 sq mi)
- Elevation: 0 m (0 ft)

Population (2025-12-31)
  - Total: 1,053
  - Density: 39.25/km^{2} (101.6/sq mi)
- Time zone: UTC+01:00 (CET)
  - Summer (DST): UTC+02:00 (CEST)
- Postal codes: 26427
- Dialling codes: 0 49 71
- Vehicle registration: WTM

Dunum is a municipality in the district of Wittmund, in Lower Saxony, Germany.
