= Ulrich von Werdum =

German traveler, diplomat (1632–1681)

- Born: 1 January 1632; Werdum
- Died: 20 March 1681 (aged 49); Werdum
- Education: University of Franeker, Heidelberg University

Ulrich von Werdum (1 January 1632 – 20 March 1681) was a German traveler and diplomat. The author of the family chronicle "Series familiae Werdumanae" (1667) and books on the history of East Frisia.

== Biography ==
Born on 1 January 1632 in the family castle of Edenserloog in Werdum, East Frisia.

He studied at the universities of Franeker (1652) and Heidelberg (1655). After the death of his parents, he became a co-owner of his parents' estate and set out on a journey.

In 1670–1672, he traveled to western Ukraine and Podillia as an agent of the French government, Abbé Pommier. Ulrich von Werdum's memoirs were published in German by J. Bernoulli in 1786–1788. In 1876, Ksawery Liske published this work in Polish.

Von Werdum gave descriptions of many cities and villages of Ukraine, provided interesting data on the historical geography of the Kholmshchyna region, Halychyna, and Podillia, on the diplomacy of John III Sobieski, and his relations with Hetman Petro Doroshenko and the Tatars during the autumn campaign of 1671. The memoirist emphasized the just nature of the national revolution of 1648–1676 led by Bohdan Khmelnytskyi. In his memoirs and diary, published in 1877 by K. Liske, Ulrich von Werdum also touched upon interfaith relations in Ukraine, characterizing the spiritual foundations of Catholicism and Orthodoxy.

In 1673–1679, together with his brother Alexander, he served under the Swedish Count Bengt Oxenstierna, who was president of the Swedish tribunal in Wismar.

In 1679, he entered the service of Princess Christine Charlotte of Württemberg of East Frisia, who appointed him her privy counselor and vice president of the House, a position he held for a short time, as he died on 20 March 1681 at his birthplace. He was buried in the local church in Werdum.

== Family ==
His parents were Hero von Werdum and his wife Kathrina Elisabeth von Morrien.

== Sources ==
- Johann Heinrich Tjaden, Das gelehrte Ost Friesland, Band 3, S. 77 f.
- Silke Cramer, Ulrich von Werdum, Das Reisejournal des Ulrich von Werdum (1670-1677), 1990, ISBN 3631420374
- Beiträge zur Spezialgeschichte Jeverlands
- Martin Stolzenau: Kritischer Zeitgenosse im Fürstendienst. In: Heimat am Meer, Beilage zur Wilhelmshavener Zeitung, Nr. 8/2021, vom 11. April 2021, S. 32.
