= Wittmund (district) =

District in Lower Saxony, Germany

Coordinates: 53°35′N 7°45′E

- District
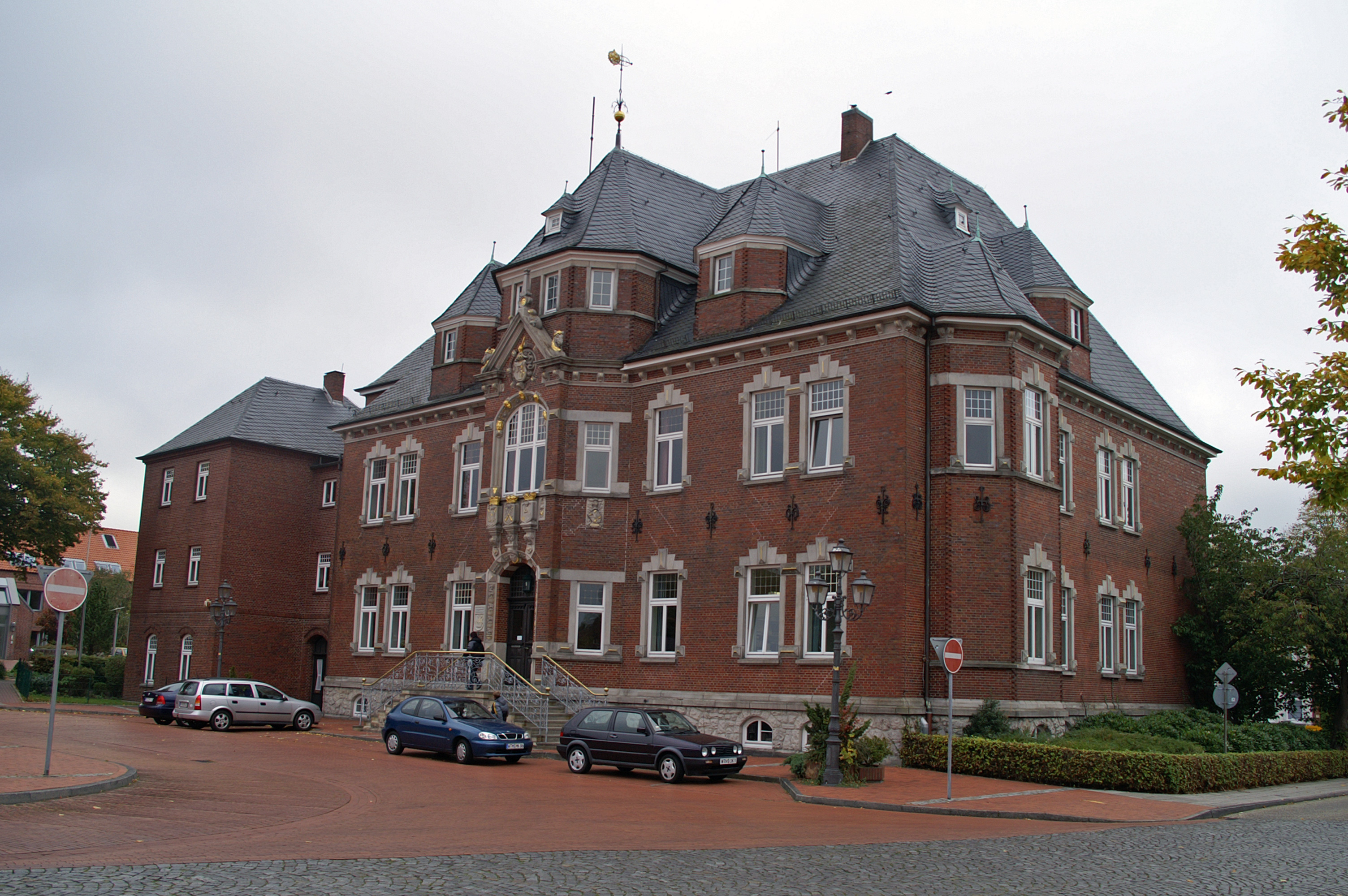

- Flag Coat of arms
- Country: Germany
- State: Lower Saxony
- Capital: Wittmund

Government
  - District admin.: Holger Heymann (SPD)

Area
  - Total: 656.65 km^{2} (253.53 sq mi)

Population (31 December 2025)
  - Total: 55,849
  - Density: 85.051/km^{2} (220.28/sq mi)
- Time zone: UTC+01:00 (CET)
  - Summer (DST): UTC+02:00 (CEST)
- Vehicle registration: WTM
- Website: landkreis-wittmund.de/

Wittmund is a Landkreis (district) in the northwestern part of Lower Saxony, Germany. It is situated in East Frisia, on the North Sea coast. Neighboring districts are (from the east clockwise) Friesland, Leer and Aurich.

== Geography ==
The district contains part of the Wadden Sea and of the Lower Saxony Wadden Sea National Park. The coastal areas of the mainland are also known as Harlinger Land. The islands of Langeoog and Spiekeroog, both belonging to the East Frisian Islands, are part of this district.

== History ==
The district was created by the Kingdom of Prussia in 1885 from the Amt Wittmund, the Amt Esens and the City of Esens. All were previously part of the District of Aurich. In 1977 the district was merged with the District of Friesland; however, the merger was not popular. The merger was declared unconstitutional in 1979 because it violated the rights of the former State of Oldenburg to which Friesland had belonged, and the two districts were re-established in their old boundaries.

== Partnerships ==
The district has a partnership with the district of Schönebeck in Saxony-Anhalt. It was started with German reunification in 1990 to help to establish district administration in former East Germany.

== Coat of arms ==
The ship in the coat of arms symbolizes the coastal location of the district. The three sails show heraldic symbols for the district — the front one shows a bear as the symbol of the Attena family from Esens, who ruled in the 14th and 15th century. The legend of the bear saving the City of Esens from its besiegers is associated with Balthasar Oomkens von Esens. The main sail shows two tournament lances as the symbol of the Hero Omken or Hero Oomkens von Esens, taken from the coat of arms of the City of Wittmund. The eagle in the rear sail stands for the castle and Amt Friedeburg.

== Towns and municipalities ==
Clickable map of towns and municipalities in the district

Towns	Samtgemeinden
1. Wittmund; Free municipalities: 1. Friedeburg; 2. Langeoog; 3. Spiekeroog	1. Esens; 1. Dunum; 2. Esens^{1, 2}; 3. Holtgast; 4. Moorweg; 5. Neuharlingersiel; 6. Stedesdorf; 7. Werdum	2. Holtriem; 1. Blomberg; 2. Eversmeer; 3. Nenndorf; 4. Neuschoo; 5. Ochtersum; 6. Schweindorf; 7. Utarp; 8. Westerholt^{1}
	^{1}seat of the Samtgemeinde; ^{2}town
