= Moorweg =

- Municipality
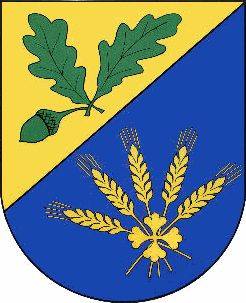
- Coat of arms

- Location of Moorweg within Wittmund district
- Interactive map of Moorweg
- Location within Germany Location within Lower Saxony
- Coordinates: 53°35′31″N 07°35′06″E
- Country: Germany
- State: Lower Saxony
- District: Wittmund
- Municipal assoc.: Esens
- Subdivisions: 5 Ortsteile

Government
  - Mayor: Dieter Tobias

Area
  - Total: 18.65 km^{2} (7.20 sq mi)
- Elevation: 2 m (6.6 ft)

Population (2025-12-31)
  - Total: 869
  - Density: 46.6/km^{2} (121/sq mi)
- Time zone: UTC+01:00 (CET)
  - Summer (DST): UTC+02:00 (CEST)
- Postal codes: 26427
- Dialling codes: 04977
- Vehicle registration: WTM

Moorweg is a municipality in the district of Wittmund, in Lower Saxony, Germany.
