= Wolthusen =

- District of Emden
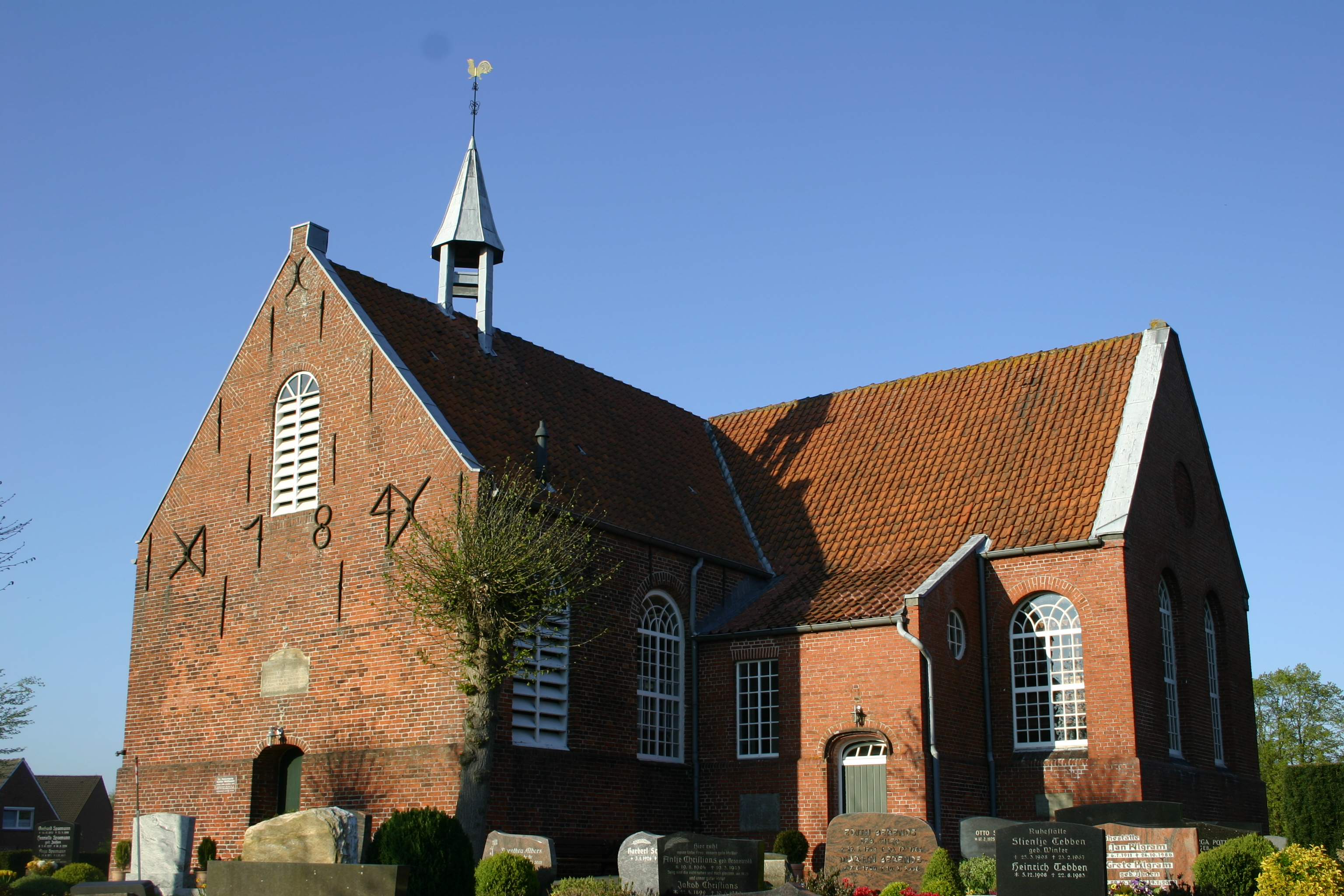
- Wolthusen Church

- Location of Wolthusen within Emden
- Interactive map of Wolthusen
- Location within Germany Location within Lower Saxony
- Coordinates: 53.37129°N 7.22648°E
- Country: Germany
- State: Lower Saxony
- City: Emden

Population
  - Metro: 4,081
- Time zone: UTC+01:00 (CET)
  - Summer (DST): UTC+02:00 (CEST)
- Dialling codes: 04921
- Vehicle registration: 26725

Wolthusen is a former village in Lower Saxony, Germany and borough (Stadtteil) of Emden. It was incorporated into the city in 1928.

The village character can still be found around the old village church from 1784. The church, located on a yard, was built on the location where a predecessor had already been built in the fifteenth century. The name of the village refers to its location in low, swampy meadows (wold), composed of -husen, i.e. 'houses'.

== Gallery ==
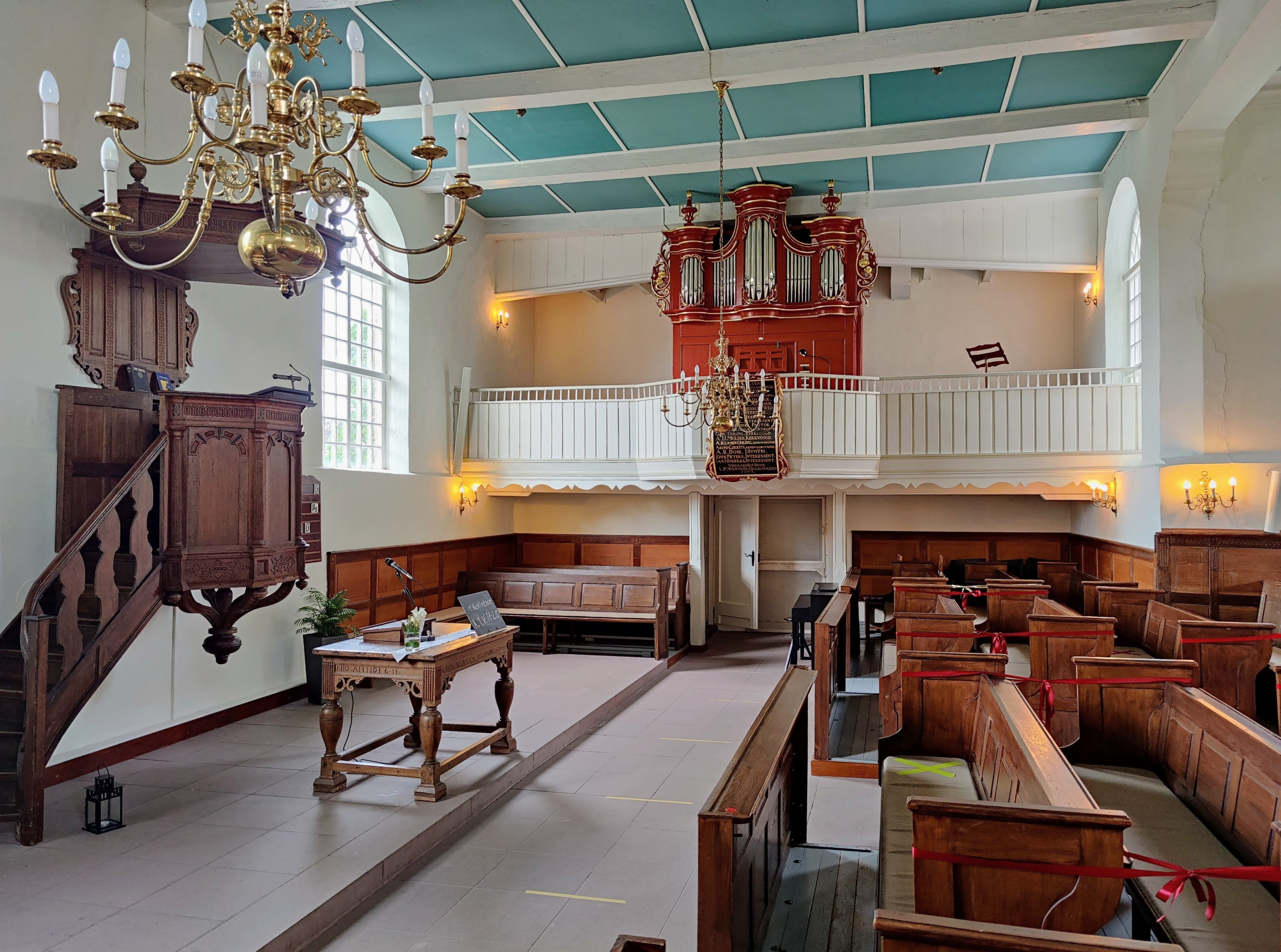
Interior of the church

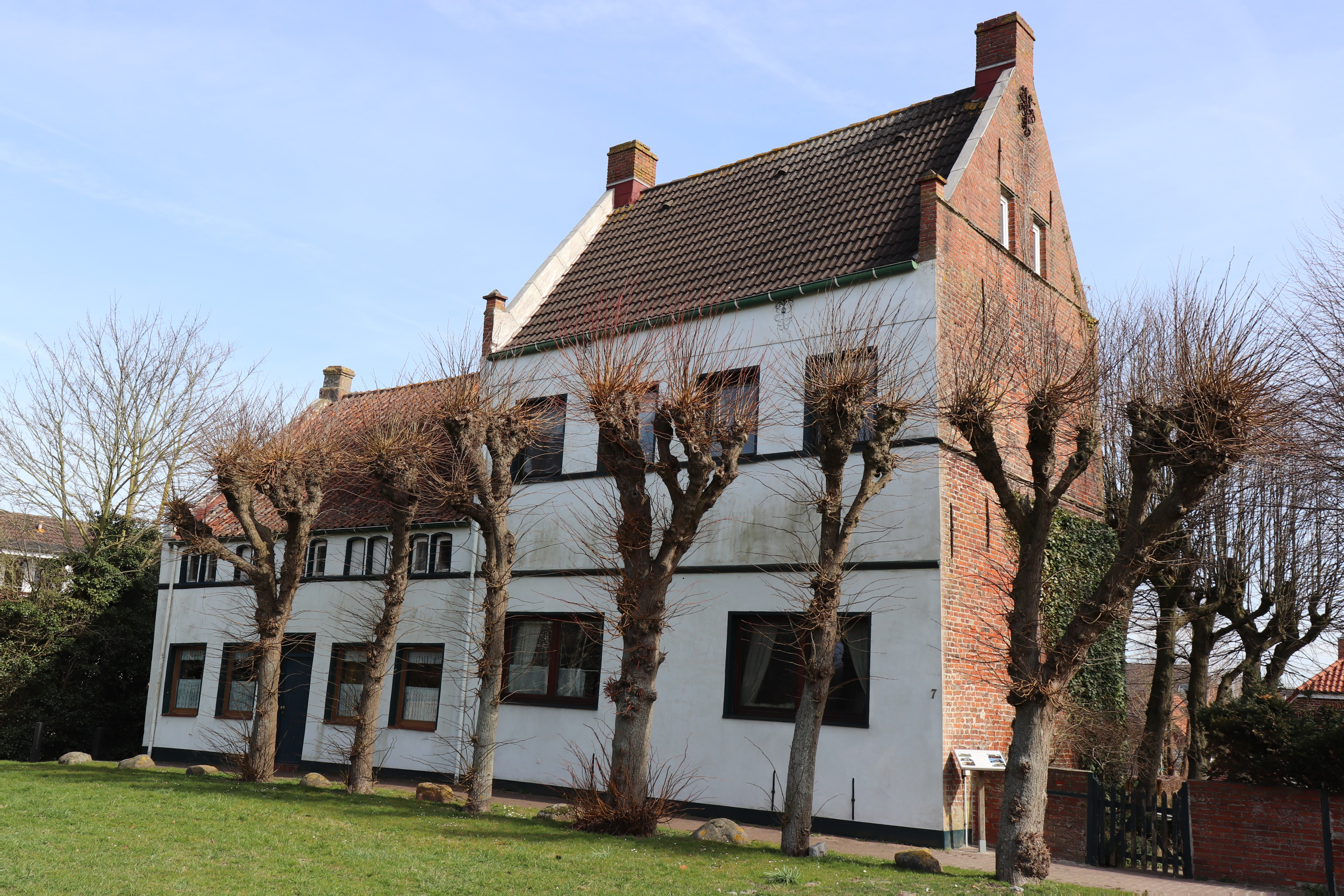
Hooge Hus ('High House')
