= Werdum =

- Municipality
- Location of Werdum within Wittmund district
- Interactive map of Werdum
- Location within Germany Location within Lower Saxony
- Coordinates: 53°39′24″N 7°43′11″E
- Country: Germany
- State: Lower Saxony
- District: Wittmund
- Municipal assoc.: Esens
- Subdivisions: 3 Ortsteile

Government
  - Mayor: Friedhelm Hass

Area
  - Total: 18.45 km^{2} (7.12 sq mi)
- Elevation: 2 m (6.6 ft)

Population (2025-12-31)
  - Total: 724
  - Density: 39.2/km^{2} (102/sq mi)
- Time zone: UTC+01:00 (CET)
  - Summer (DST): UTC+02:00 (CEST)
- Postal codes: 26427
- Dialling codes: 0 49 74
- Vehicle registration: WTM
- Website: www.werdum.de

Werdum is a municipality in the district of Wittmund, in Lower Saxony, Germany.

== Notable residents ==
- Ulrich von Werdum (1632–1681), German traveler and diplomat
