= Ochtersum =

- Municipality
- Location of Ochtersum within Wittmund district
- Interactive map of Ochtersum
- Location within Germany Location within Lower Saxony
- Coordinates: 53°36′N 07°31′E
- Country: Germany
- State: Lower Saxony
- District: Wittmund
- Municipal assoc.: Holtriem

Government
  - Mayor: Franz Pfaff (FW)

Area
  - Total: 10.82 km^{2} (4.18 sq mi)
- Elevation: 5 m (16 ft)

Population (2025-12-31)
  - Total: 934
  - Density: 86.3/km^{2} (224/sq mi)
- Time zone: UTC+01:00 (CET)
  - Summer (DST): UTC+02:00 (CEST)
- Postal codes: 26489
- Dialling codes: 0 49 75
- Vehicle registration: WTM

Ochtersum is a municipality in the district of Wittmund, in Lower Saxony, Germany.
