= Acronius =

Acronius is a surname. Notable people with the surname include:

- Johannes Acronius (1565–1627), Frisian-German theologian
- Johannes Acronius Frisius (1520–1564), Frisian-Dutch mathematician and doctor
- Ruard Acronius (1546–1612), Frisian-Dutch theologian

== See also ==
- Akron
- Acron (disambiguation)
