= Visquard =

- Village of Krummhörn
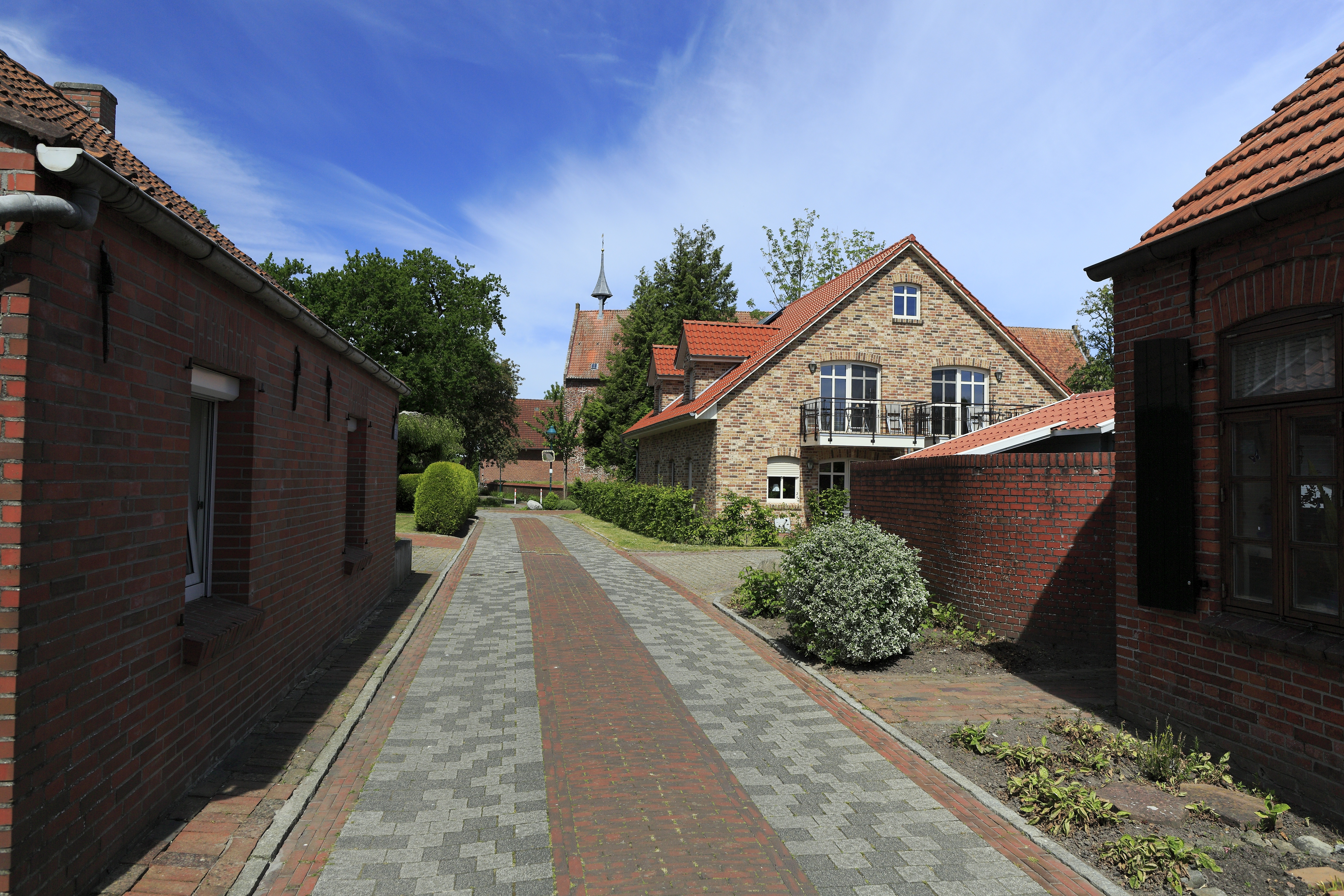
- Street in Visquard

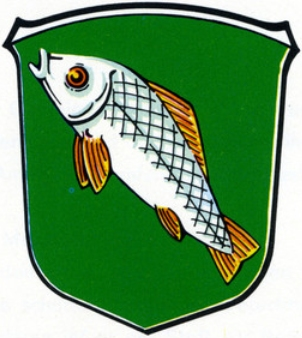
- Coat of arms
- Interactive map of Visquard
- Location within Germany Location within Lower Saxony
- Country: Germany
- State: Lower Saxony
- District: Aurich
- Municipality: Krummhörn

Area
  - Metro: 10.06 km^{2} (3.88 sq mi)
- Elevation: 6 m (20 ft)

Population
  - Metro: 693
- Time zone: UTC+01:00 (CET)
  - Summer (DST): UTC+02:00 (CEST)
- Postal codes: 26736
- Dialling codes: 04923

Visquard is a village in the region of East Frisia, in Lower Saxony, Germany. It is part of the municipality of Krummhörn. The village is located to the north of Pewsum and to the south of Greetsiel.

The village church dates from the 13th century. To the northwest of Visquard lay the Appingen Abbey, of which currently only a small hamlet remains.

== Geography ==
Visquard belongs to the East Frisian municipality of Krummhörn and is located about 13 kilometers from the city of Emden. It is located on the edge of the former Bay of Sielmönken and is on district Kreisstraße 231, which branches off to the right from Landesstraße 4 between Jennelt and Pewsum. Developed farm roads lead to the villages of Manslagt and Pilsum and via the hamlet of Appingen to Greetsiel. The Greetsieler Tief, a watercourse open to canoe campers, also connects the village with the places mentioned and with Pewsum. The nearest train station is in Emden.

Visquard is a typical Rundwarften dorf ('round warft village') with a diameter of around 450 meters, where the church is located at the highest point and winding streets and paths lead all around.

== Etymology ==
The spelling of the name Visquard has changed several times over the centuries. In the Vita Liudgeri, the biography of Münster Bishop Ludger from the first half of the 9th century, the name is Wyscwyrt. The East Frisian document book shows the spelling Fiscwert for 1380. In the two dike registers of the Greetsiel office from 1625, we read Fisquard and in the so-called Kopfschatzung ('head estimate') from 1719 we find the place name in the form in which it is still valid today.

The name of the village consists of two parts, vis and quard. Arend Remmers derives vis – contrary to folk etymology – not from 'fish' (as represented in the village's coat of arms), but from Old Frisian wiske or Middle Low German wisch(e) ('meadow'). The second part of the name goes back to werth, werder, warden and originally stands for a "surface elevation in a wetland" and later also for an artificially created terp or wurt. Visquard therefore means "meadow warft".

== History ==
In the oldest documented mention of Visquard from 945, the Latinized village name is villa Frisgana. It can be found in the list of his possessions in Federgo compiled by a certain Gerbert under the name bona mea in paco Federit gewe.

In the summaries of the Fulda monastery compiled by a monk named Eberhard in the 12th century, Visquard is initially referred to as villa Frisgana, but later – at a later point in the summaries – as Viscuwirda. Leiner translates this name as: "Warfendorf (wirda), whose residents live from fish (visc)".

The fact that Visquard was surrounded by water in earlier times is still clear today from some of the district names in the area, for example Leegland and Visquarder Maar.

An archaeological excavation in the Visquard area carried out in 1913 uncovered urns and grave goods whose shape and drawings refer to pre-Christian times. A fireplace was also found containing freshly baked and hand-shaped clay balls, which were probably intended as net weights. The evaluation of another excavation around 1961 revealed a settlement horizon from the year 800 AD.

Visquard has been a chieftain's seat since the 13th century. It had two castle sites (so-called Steinhäuser): one in the northwest and the other in the southeast of the village. While the large castle site in the northwest fell victim to land consolidation in the 1950s, the smaller castle is still preserved. The first chieftain to appear by name in the village's annals is Siebrand Ulberna von Visquard. He ruled in the first half of the 14th century and published a law code together with the neighboring chieftains of Westerhusen, Hinte and Twixlum as well as with the Drost Wiard of Emden. The second chieftain reported by the sources is Wygert tho Visquarden.

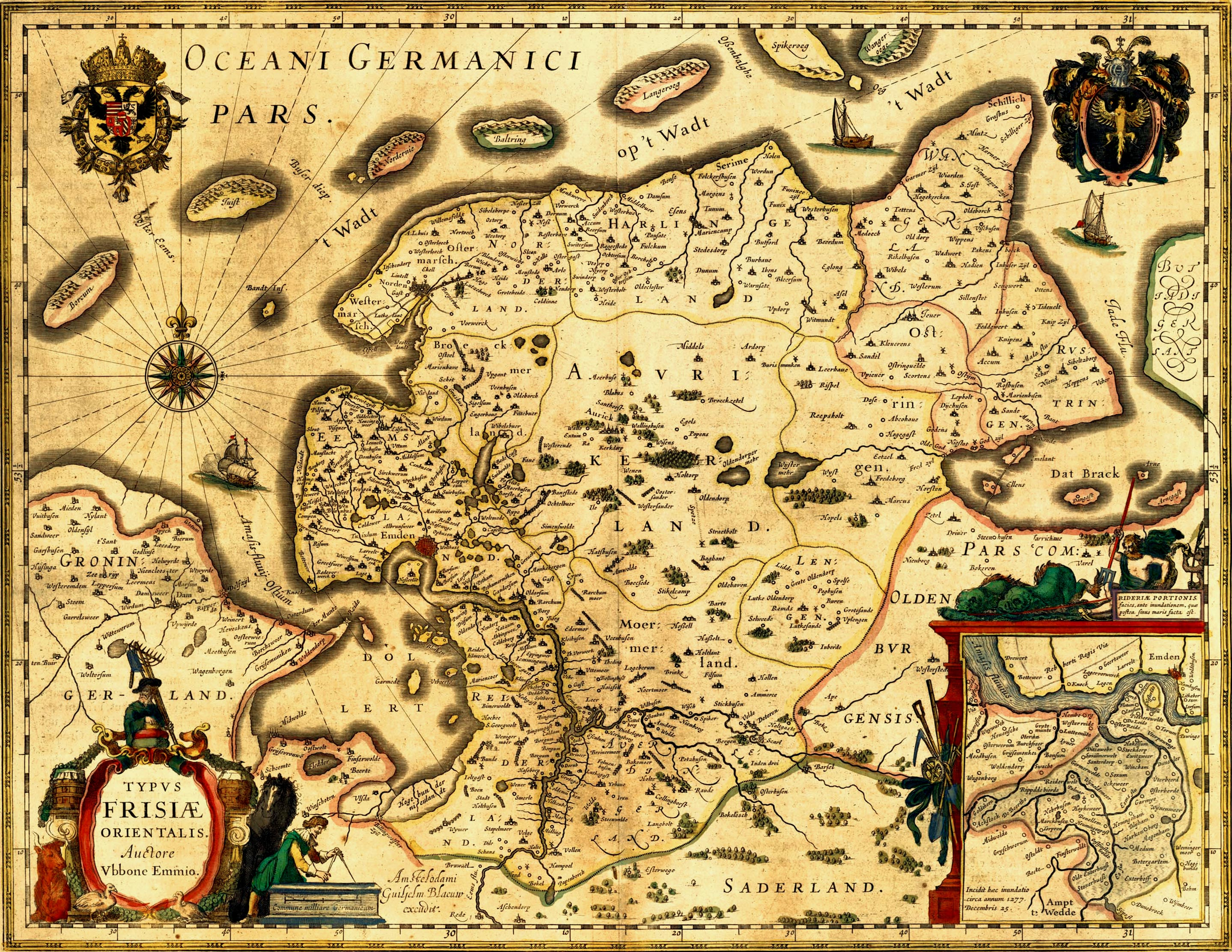
Map of East Frisia by Ubbo Emmius (circa 1600) on which Visquert is mentioned

In 1744 Visquard, like all of East Frisia, fell to Prussia. In 1756, the Prussian officials created a statistical trade overview for East Frisia. That year there were 29 merchants and craftsmen in Visquard, making the place the third largest number of merchants and craftsmen in the Krummhörn after the towns of Greetsiel and Pilsum. These included seven linen weavers, four shoemakers, three each carpenters, bakers and tailors, two bricklayers and blacksmiths as well as one cooper and glazier each. The three merchants traded in tea, salt, tobacco and soap.

During the Hanover period in East Frisia, Visquard belonged to the Amt of Greetsiel (1824), which was in turn divided into the Amtsvogteien of Greetsiel, Pewsum and Borkum. Visquard belonged to the Greetsiel Amtsvogtei, which in turn was divided into the Eilsum and Grimersum Untervogteien. Visquard, along with Grimersum and Wirdum, was part of the Grimersum Untervogtei.

As part of the Hanover Amt reform in 1859, the Amt of Greetsiel was dissolved and added to the Amt of Emden; Visquard has belonged to the latter since then. During the Prussian Kreis reform in 1885, the Kreis of Emden was formed from the Amt of Emden, to which Visquard then belonged.

For centuries, the natural Tiefs and drainage canals that run through the Krummhörn in a dense network were the most important means of transport. Not only the villages but also many farms were connected to the city of Emden and the port town of Greetsiel via ditches and canals. Boat traffic with Emden was particularly important. Village boatmen took over the supply of goods from the city to the towns and delivered agricultural products in the opposite direction.

Peat, which was mostly obtained in the East Frisian boglands, played an important role as heating material for the residents of the Krummhörn for centuries. The peat ships brought the material along the East Frisian canal network to the Krummhörn villages, including Visquard. On their return trip to the settlements, the peat boatmen often took with them clay soil from the marsh as well as the dung of the cattle, which they used to fertilize their peat-harvested areas at home.

In April 1919 there were so-called Speckumzügen ('bacon parades') by Emden workers, which were followed by farm worker unrest. Together with Rheiderland, the Emden district was the part of East Frisia most affected by these unrests. Workers set off in closed trains to surrounding villages and stole food from farmers, sparking clashes. The situation only calmed down after the Reichswehr troops were deployed to the region. In response to this, residents' defense groups were formed in almost all towns in the Emden area. Visquard's residents' defense force consisted of 72 people, making it one of the largest in the Emden district. They had 30 weapons. The residents' defense forces were only dissolved after a corresponding decree from the Interior Minister of Prussia Carl Severing on April 10, 1920.

On July 1, 1972, Visquard was incorporated into the new municipality of Krummhörn.

== Gallery ==
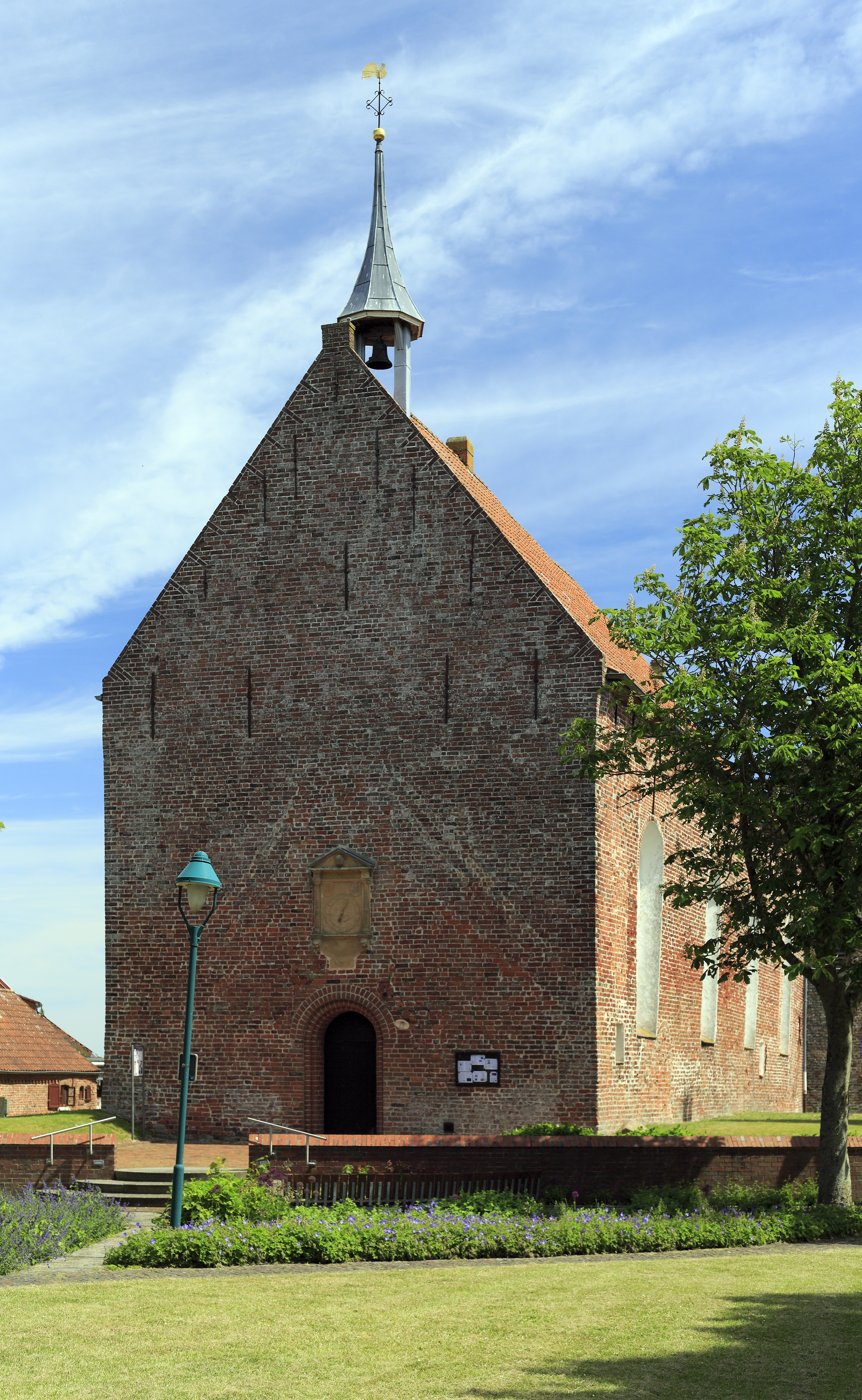
Church of Visquard

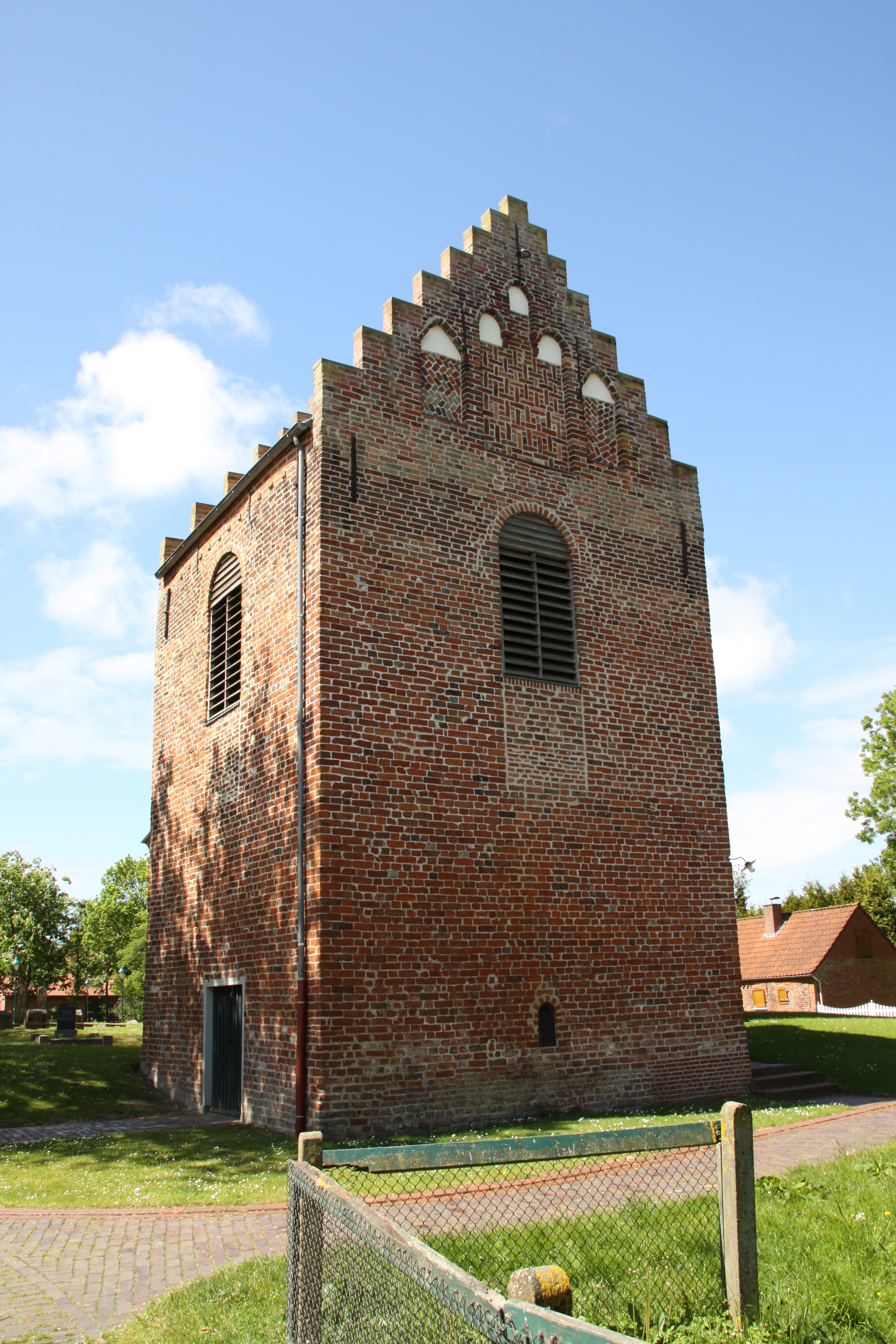
Belltower of the Church of Visquard

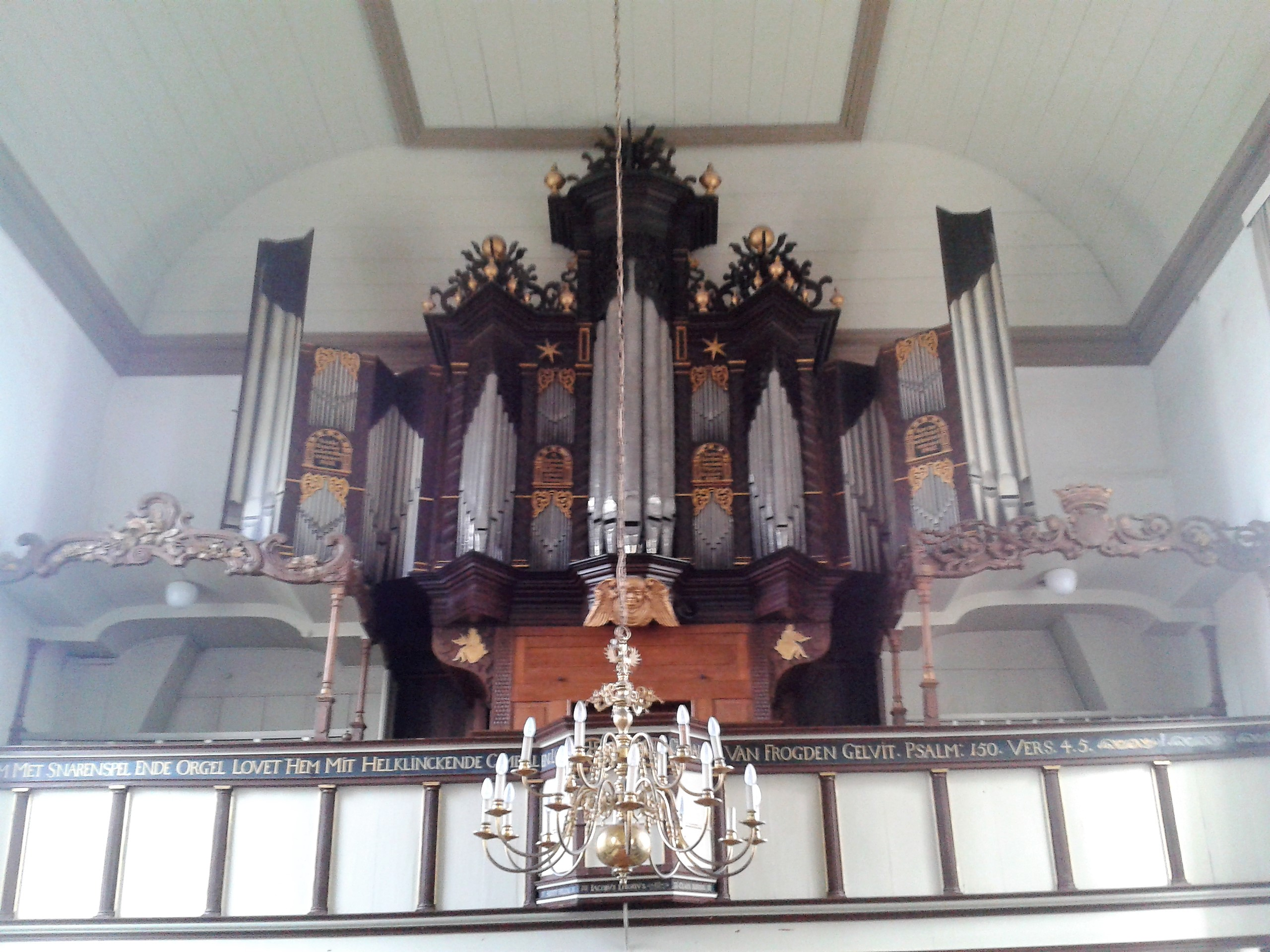
Organ in the church

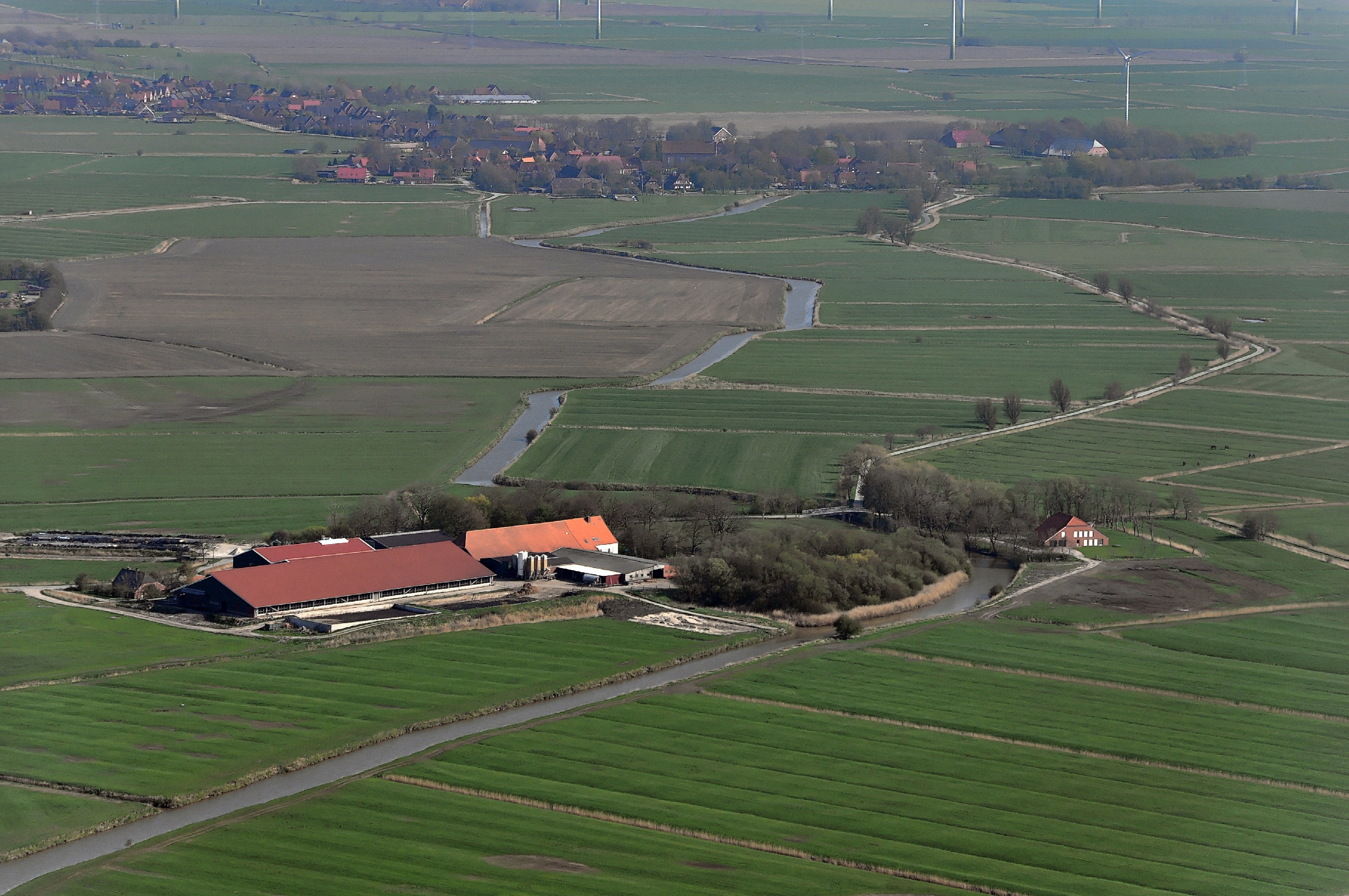
Aerial view of the location of former Appingen Abbey
