= Ruard Acronius =

Ruard Acronius (1546, Friesland – November 1612, Schiedam) was a Reformed theologian of the late 16th century.

Some sources refer to Ruard Acronius as the brother of Johannes Acronius while others mention that he has been a Catholic priest at first. In 1572 he appears as Reformed preacher in Franeker. In the following, he worked for several years in Alkmaar and Bolsward. In 1599, he became preacher in Schiedam where he died late in 1612.

He was described as an educated, but intolerant and vigorous man. For instance he challenged the Mennonites for a public debate, which indeed took place in 1596 between him and Pieter van Ceulen. After 56 long sessions both parties declared their own victory.

He took an important part in the quarrels between the Arminians and the Calvinists under Franciscus Gomarus. He helped Gomarus himself during an encounter in 1609 in The Hague.

He tried to hinder the appearance of Jan Uytenbogaert in Bleiswijk. Uytenbogaert defending the right of the worldly leaders to decide upon ecclesiastic matters, published in 1610 a tract Tractaet van 't ambt ende Authoriteyt eener hoogher Christelicker Overheyt - countered by Acronius with the writing Noodwendig Vertoog.

In 1610 the Remonstrants (Arminians) filed a presentation of their views at the States of Holland, the Remonstrance that gave them their name. Acronius' name is the first appearing on a counter-remonstrance filed by six delegates of the Calvinist belief.

== Publications ==
- Onderregtinge over 't onderholt der dienaren der waren ghemeynten Christi, Franeker, 1590
- Enarrationes Catecheticae, Sciedam, 1606
- Onderwyzinge over de Christ. catechism., Sciedam, 1608
- Noodwendig Vertoog, 1610

== Sources ==
- Allgemeine Deutsche Biographie - online version
