= Appingen Abbey =

Former Carmelite monastery in Greetsiel, Germany

Coordinates: 53°28′58″N 7°05′26″E

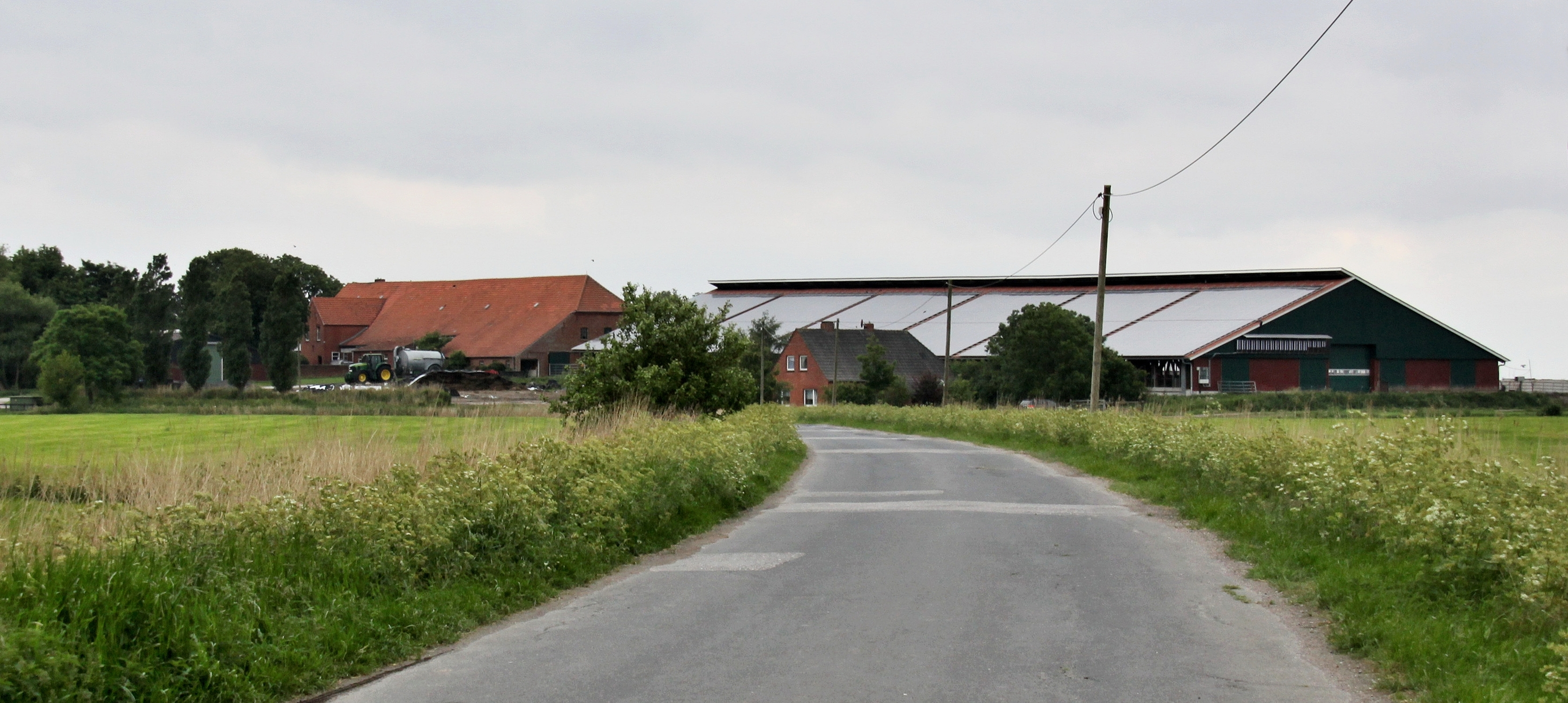
Kloster Appingen-CN

Appingen Abbey (German: Kloster Appingen) is a former Carmelite monastery in the parish of Greetsiel, which is dedicated to Saint Mary. It was named after the village of the same name.

== History ==
The monastery was founded in 1437 by the chieftain family of Cirksena. They gave the old parish church of Appingen to the Carmelite order. Originally the family came from this place, but left after the town was cut off from the sea by embankments and so gradually lost its importance to Greetsiel, the future seat of the Cirksena. The monastery in Appingen was the only branch of the Carmelites in East Frisia and the last to be founded in the region overall.

The founder and benefactor of the monastery was Enno Cirksena, the father of the later imperial count, Ulrich Cirksena. Not much is known about the history of the monastery. In addition to the existing church, a stone house for the monks and a mill were built, for which the Cirksena also had rights of use. Initially it was established for just three or four priests, but in later times was considerably extended. In its heyday at least 20 monks lived in the abbey.

Shortly before the Reformation, the monastery of Aten, in the present-day borough of Nordenham, was planted by Appingen. In 1530 the monastery of Balthasar von Esen was burned in one of his many feuds with the counts of East Frisia, but not completely destroyed like nearby Dykhusen Abbey of the Dominican Order. The monastery was re-established and adopted in 1531 by the nuns of Dykhusen. In the subsequent period, the monastery was secularized and leased from 1545 by the counts of East Frisia.

Of the former village and Appingen and its abbey, only a farm belonging to Visquard remains today.
