= Groothusen =

- Village of Krummhörn
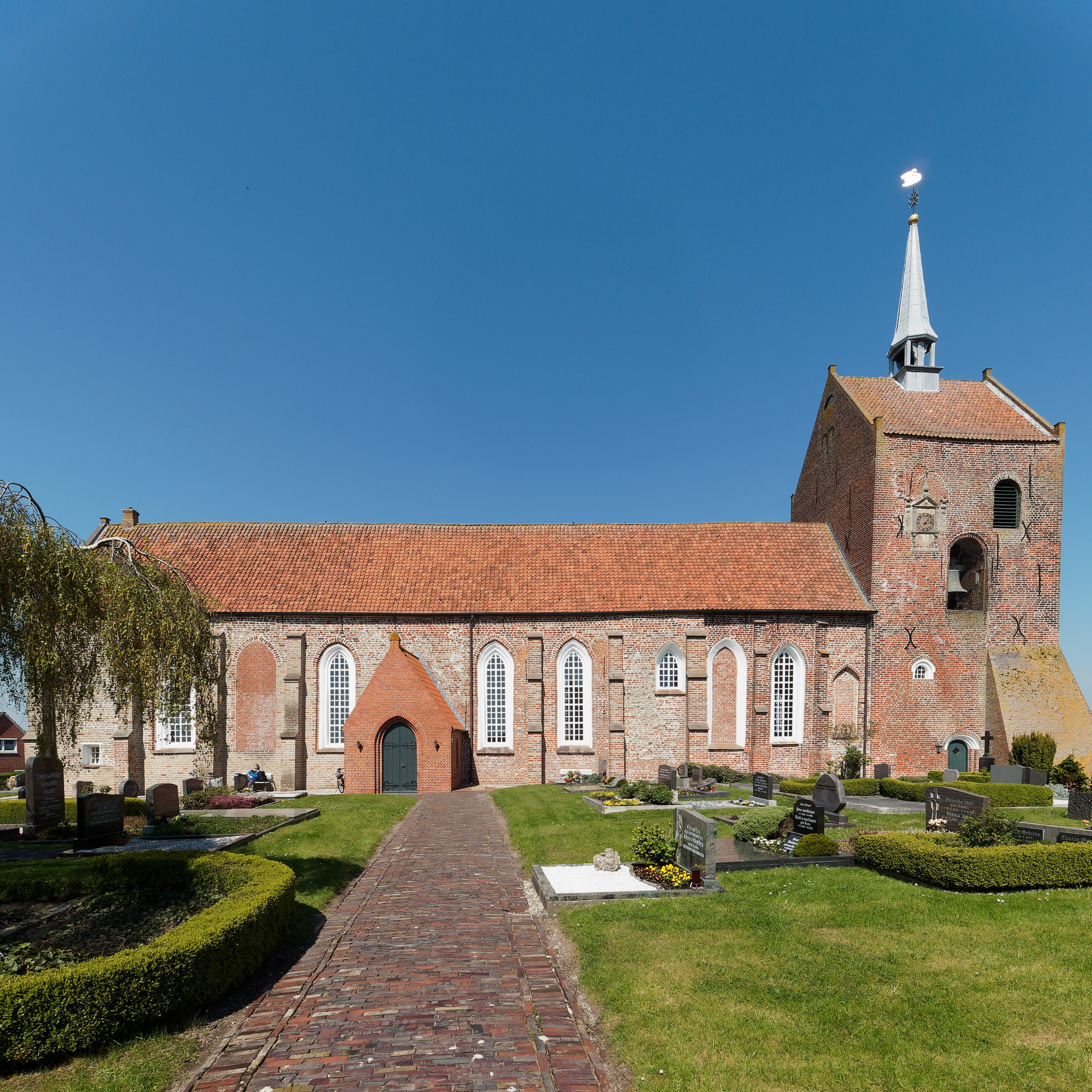
- St. Peter's Church

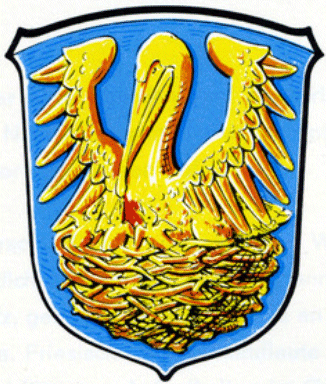
- Coat of arms
- Interactive map of Groothusen
- Location within Germany Location within Lower Saxony
- Coordinates: 53.43543°N 7.06396°E
- Country: Germany
- State: Lower Saxony
- District: Aurich
- Municipality: Krummhörn
- Elevation: 0 m (0 ft)

Population (2006-12-31)
  - Total: 474
- Time zone: UTC+01:00 (CET)
  - Summer (DST): UTC+02:00 (CEST)
- Postal codes: 26736
- Dialling codes: 04923

Groothusen is an old Langwurtendorf – a village on an artificially-built ridge – in the municipality of Krummhörn in western East Frisia on Germany's North Sea coast. It lies about 15 kilometres northwest of the seaport of Emden and has a population of 474 (2006). The ridge or warf has a length of about 500 metres and a width of some 130 metres and was built to raise the village above the water level should flooding from the sea occur, for instance, during a storm tide.

== History ==
According to the urbarium from Werden Abbey, the village was first mentioned in the year 1000 under the name Husum, but it had probably been established in the 8th century. Based on excavations carried out locally it can be inferred that it was probably a Wikdorf or trading post. It was laid out on a creek (Priel) that discharged into the so-called "Bay of Sielmönken" which has since completely silted up.

At that time it was only about 500 metres from the coast and therefore close to Frisia's maritime trading routes including the route between Dorestad and Haithabu. Frisian merchants stacked their goods here and were accommodated in the village if they needed to stay for any length of time. After dykes were built in the 13th century Groothusen lost its importance as a trading post. Other Langwurtendorf villages in East Frisia are found near Groothusen including Grimersum (Krummhörn), Jemgum and Hatzum (Rheiderland), and in the centres of Oldersum (Moormerland) and in Nesse (Norder Marsch).

By the Early Middle Ages, Husum was the seat of a Münster provost (Propstei). The northwestern end of the long warf village is formed by the large St. Peter's Church, one of the six provost churches in the old Emsgau, with its huge tower. The bell dates to the year 1526. The gravestone of Adda von Meckenaborg, lady of Groothusen, from 1590, carved in blue stone is particularly fine. As well as other impressive graves, the church has a splendid 1454 cast bronze baptismal font by Ghert Klinghe and a valuable organ by Johann Friedrich Wenthin (1798–1801) with unique flute tones.

There were once three manor houses in Groothusen - the Osterburg, Middelburg and Westerburg. Only the Osterburg - rebuilt in 1490 - has been preserved; the other two were destroyed in feuds in 1400 and 1432 by Hamburg's citizens. The Osterburg is on the eastern side of the village by a protected area and has a long, historic lime avenue. Today it houses numerous historical memorabilia.

== Gallery ==
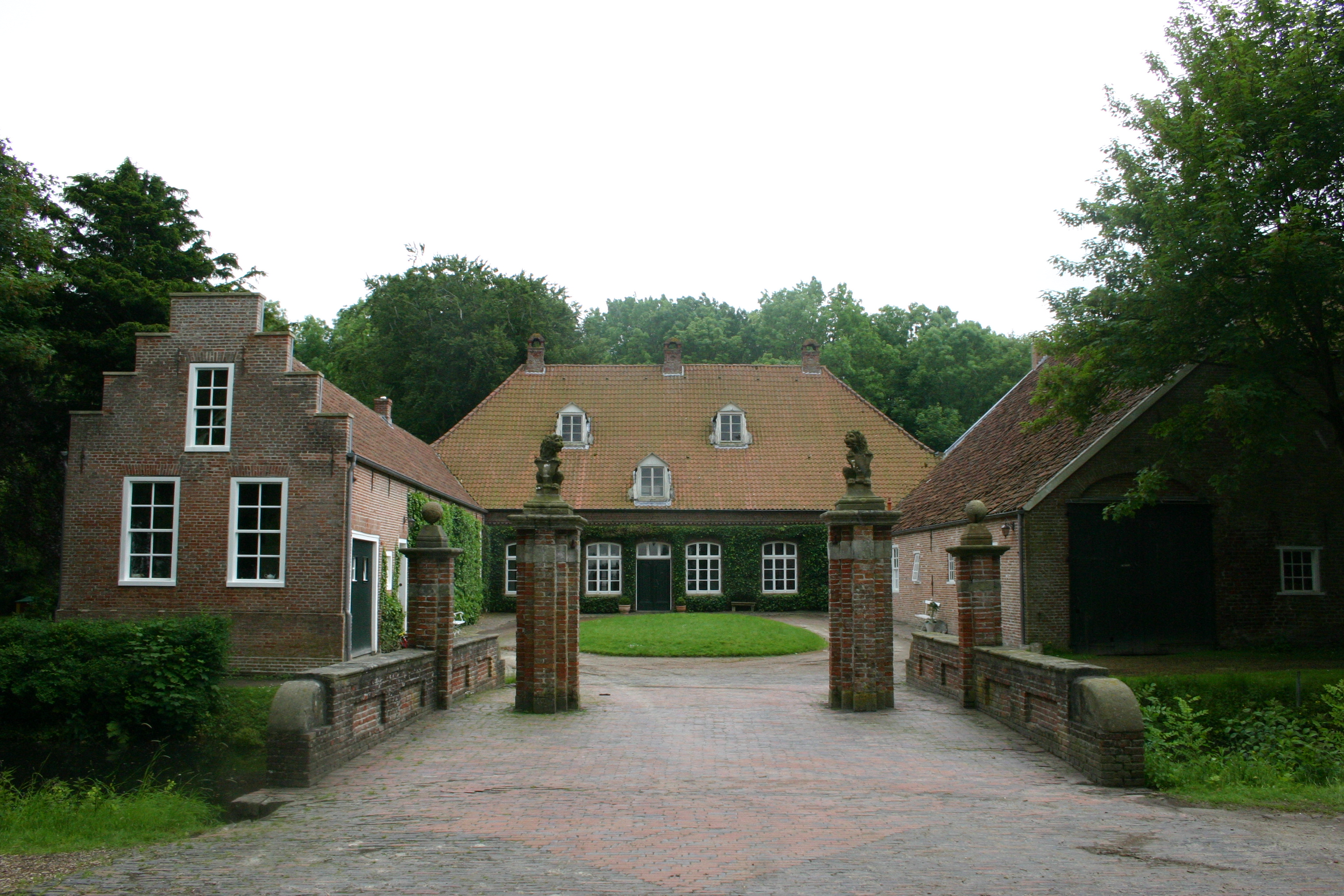
Osterburg

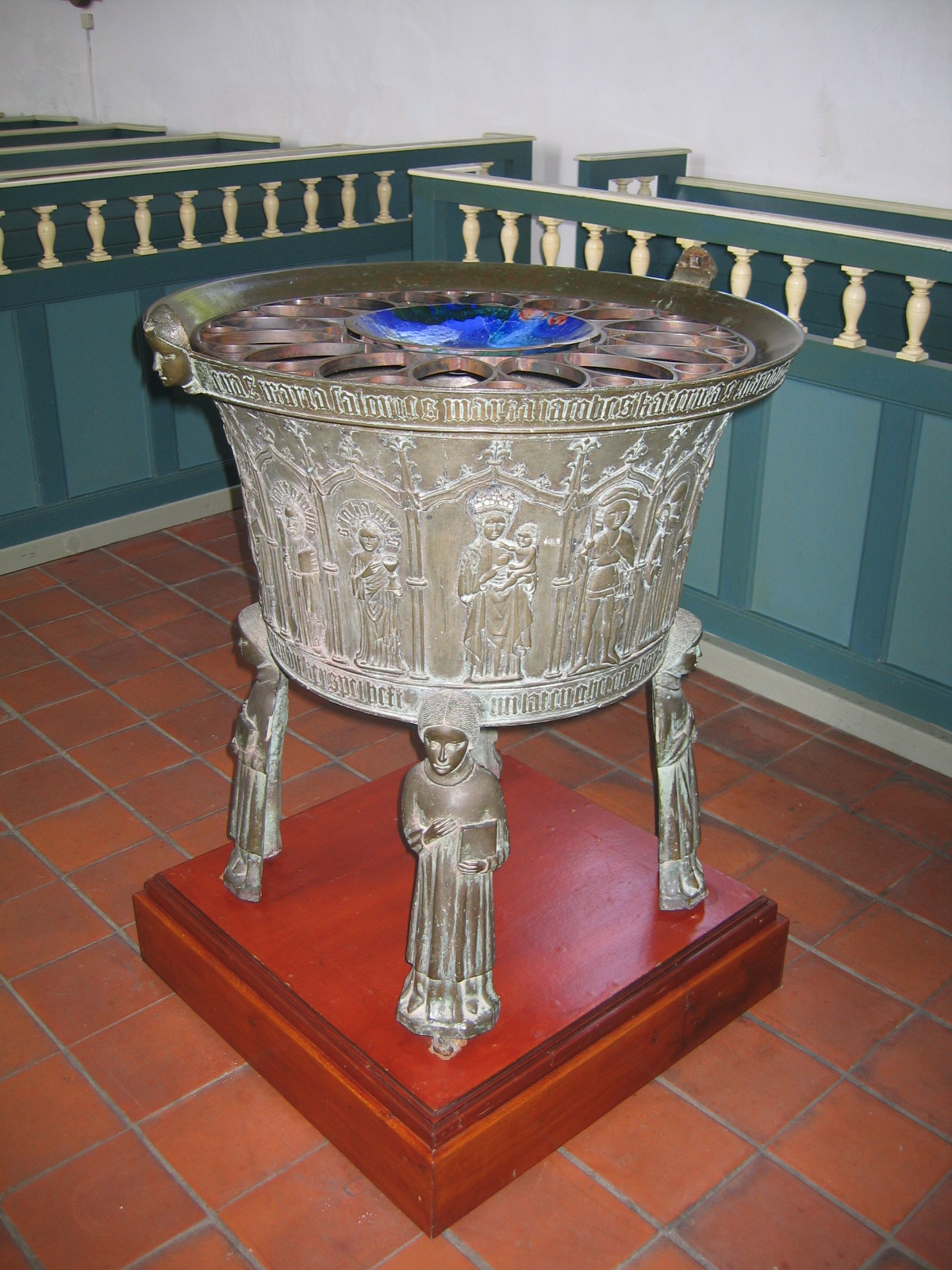
15th century bronze font in St. Peter's Church

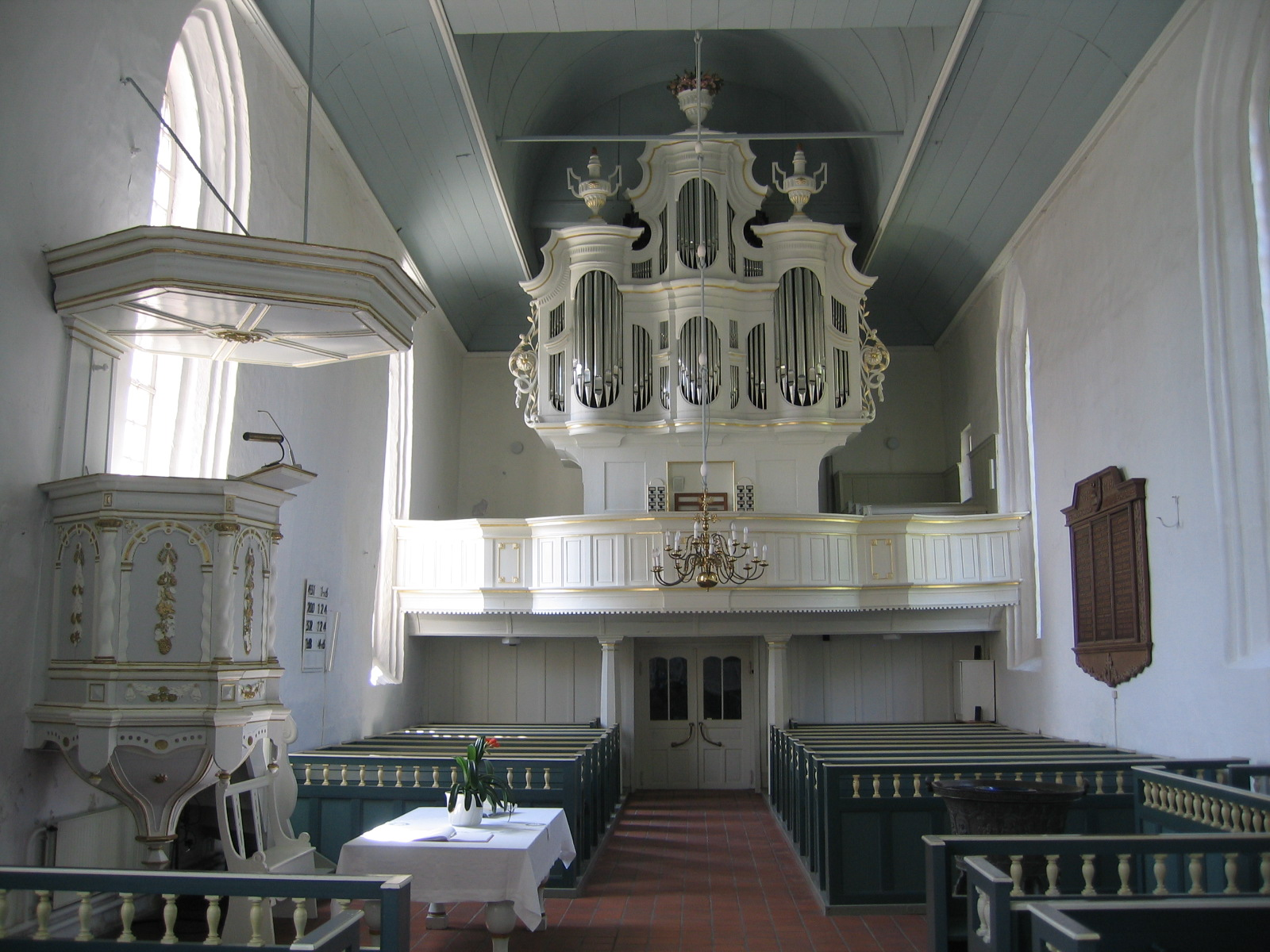
18th century organ in St. Peter's Church

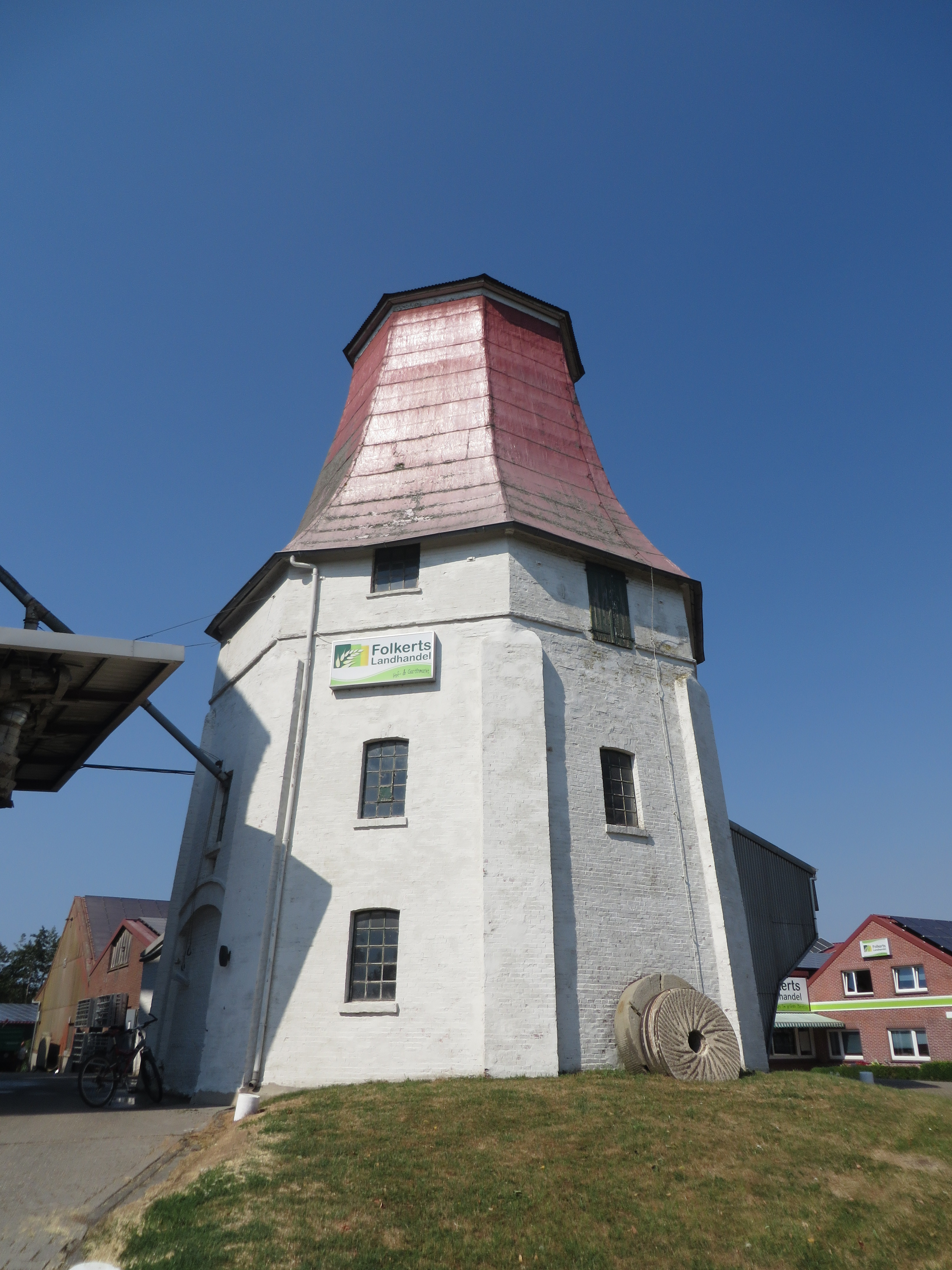
Windmill

== Sources ==
- Kempe, Enno F. (1989). Die Osterburg zu Groothusen (Ostfriesischer Kunstführer, Heft 12). Aurich
- Reinhardt, Waldemar (1959). Die Grabung auf der Dorfwarf von Groothusen, Kreis Norden, und ihre Ergebnisse. In: Jahrbuch der Gesellschaft für bildende Kunst und vaterländische Altertümer zu Emden. Vol. 39, p. 30-36.
