= Osterburg (Groothusen) =

Water castle in Groothusen, Germany

- Groothusen
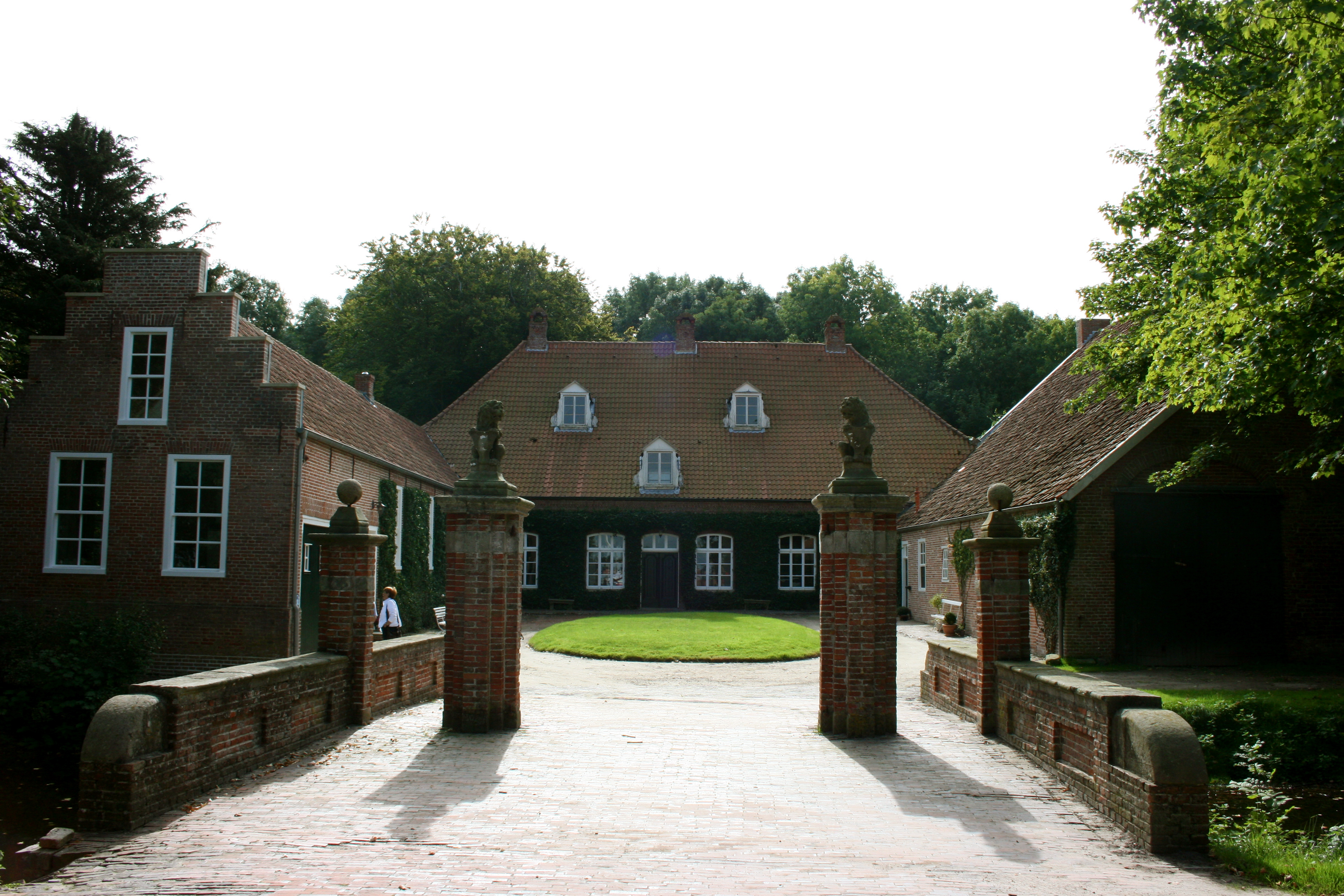

Site information
- Type: Lowland castle
- Code: DE-NI
- Condition: Preserved or largely preserved

Location
- Coordinates: 53°26′07″N 7°04′08″E

Site history
- Built: around 1200 to 1300

The Osterburg is a castle from the High Middle Ages in the village of Groothusen in the municipality of Krummhörn, in the district of Aurich in Lower Saxony, Germany.

== Location ==
The castle lies at the eastern end of the East Frisian village next to a protected landscape. Today it houses a large quantity of historical memorabilia.

== History ==
The village of Groothusen was originally built on a long warft in the early Middle Ages and was an important trading centre and meeting place in the Frisian Emsigerland, as well as the provost office for 12 parishes. At that time, like many other places in Krummhörn, it was on the edge of a bay and was accessible to shipping. There were, in those days, three moated castles in the village: the Osterburg, Middelburg and Westerburg. Only the Osterburg - rebuilt in 1490 - has survived; the other two were destroyed by Hamburg forces during feuds in 1400 and 1432.

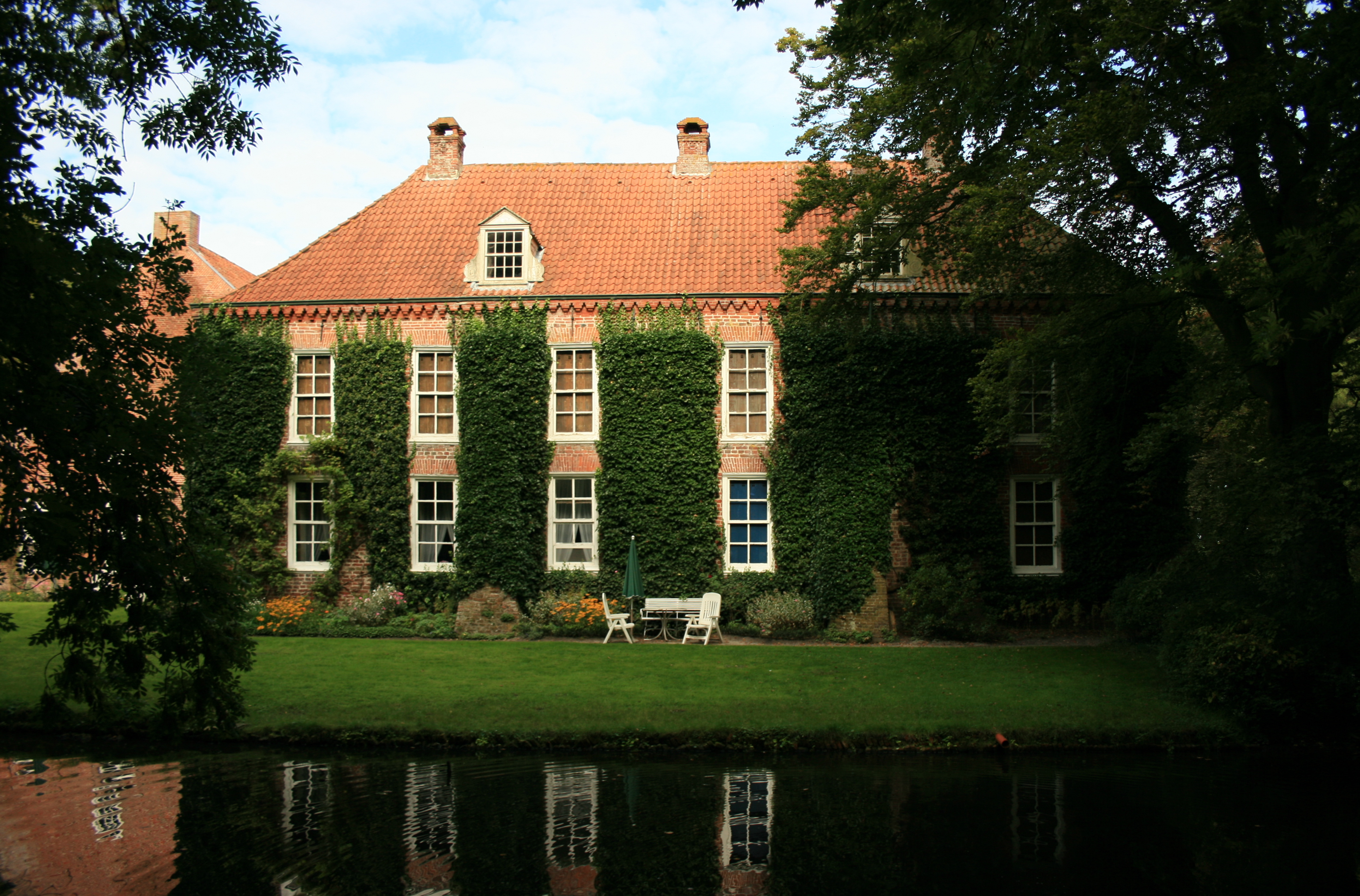
The hall

The Osterburg, is surrounded by a moat in the middle of a park with an old lime tree avenue. The oldest part is a long, two-story hall, which was built around 1490 by the chieftain family of Beninga. Around 1550 the castle was converted into a three-winged manor house, when two lower wings were built in front of the hall. In 1700 the right wing was demolished to make way for a Gulf farmhouse, which was built in 1707. The last structural change to the Osterburg was carried out in 1900, when a hallway was built in front of the hall. So the form of the original building cannot be easily seen from the front. From the rear of the building there is however a view of the original stage of construction.

Today the Osterburg houses a significant collection of cultural and art historical artefacts such as furniture, weapons, a library, items of Old East Frisian culture and a remarkable art collection of ancestral portraits from five centuries.

The castle is now owned by the descendants of the chieftain family of Beninga and may be visited on guided tours arranged by telephone. The left wing has been extended to create guest rooms, where a bed and breakfast is offered.

== Sources ==
- Kempe, Enno F. (1989). Die Osterburg zu Groothusen (Ostfriesische Kunstführer, Heft 12). Aurich. ISBN 3-925365-34-6
