= Jennelt =

- Village of Krummhörn
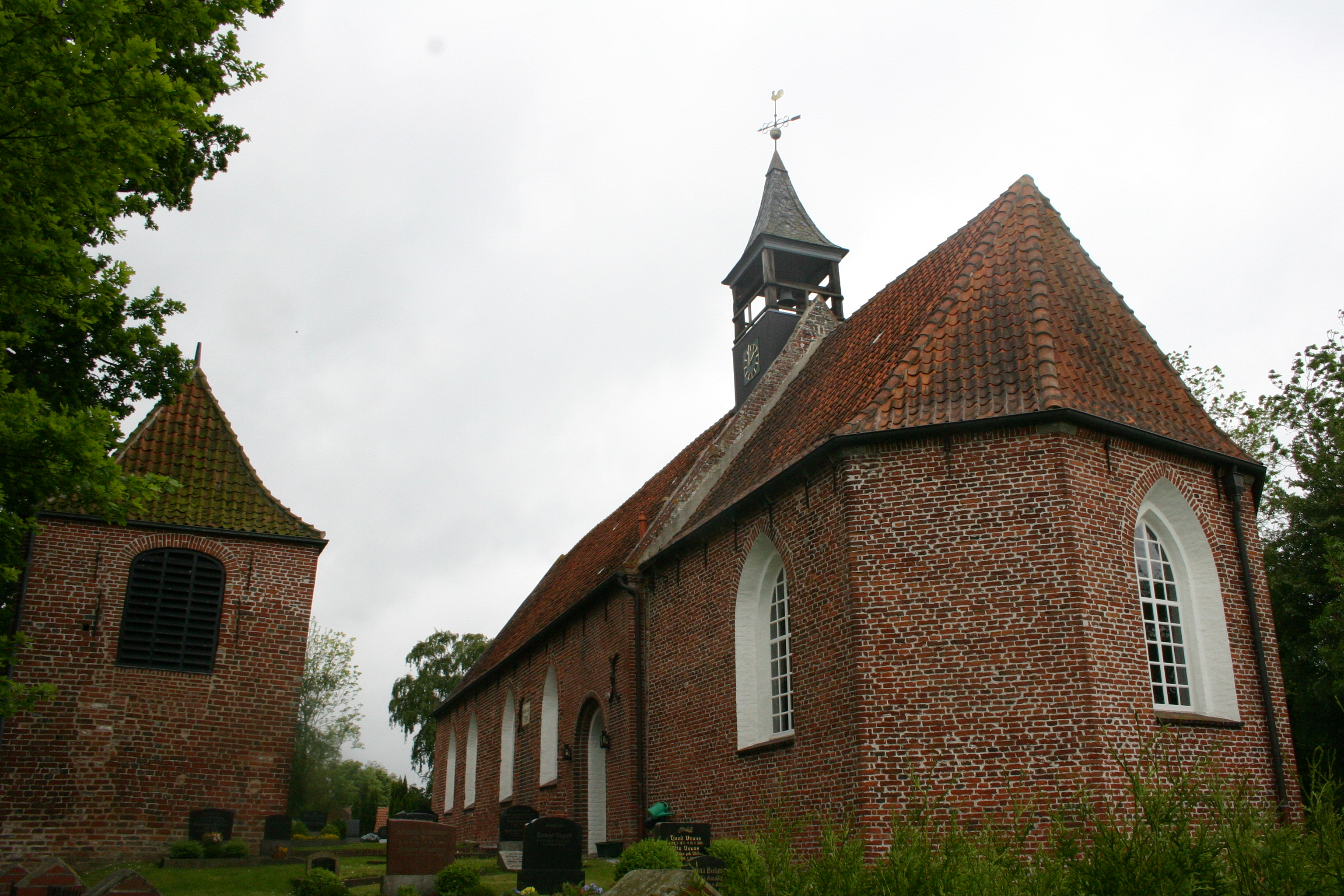
- Church of Jennelt

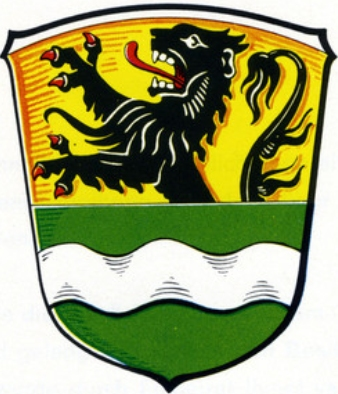
- Coat of arms
- Interactive map of Jennelt
- Location within Germany Location within Lower Saxony
- Country: Germany
- State: Lower Saxony
- District: Aurich
- Municipality: Krummhörn

Area
  - Metro: 3.57 km^{2} (1.38 sq mi)
- Elevation: 1 m (3.3 ft)

Population
  - Metro: 362
- Time zone: UTC+01:00 (CET)
  - Summer (DST): UTC+02:00 (CEST)
- Postal codes: 26736
- Dialling codes: 04923

Jennelt is a village in the region of East Frisia, in Lower Saxony, Germany. It is part of the municipality of Krummhörn. The village is located to the east of Visquard and to the south of Eilsum.

Jennelt was built on a warft and already mentioned as Gein Leth in the 8th/9th century. Other early spellings include Geenlede, Jennlede, Jennlete, and Jennlet. In the last half of the 13th century, the Church of Jennelt was built on the western side of the elongated village.

== Gallery ==
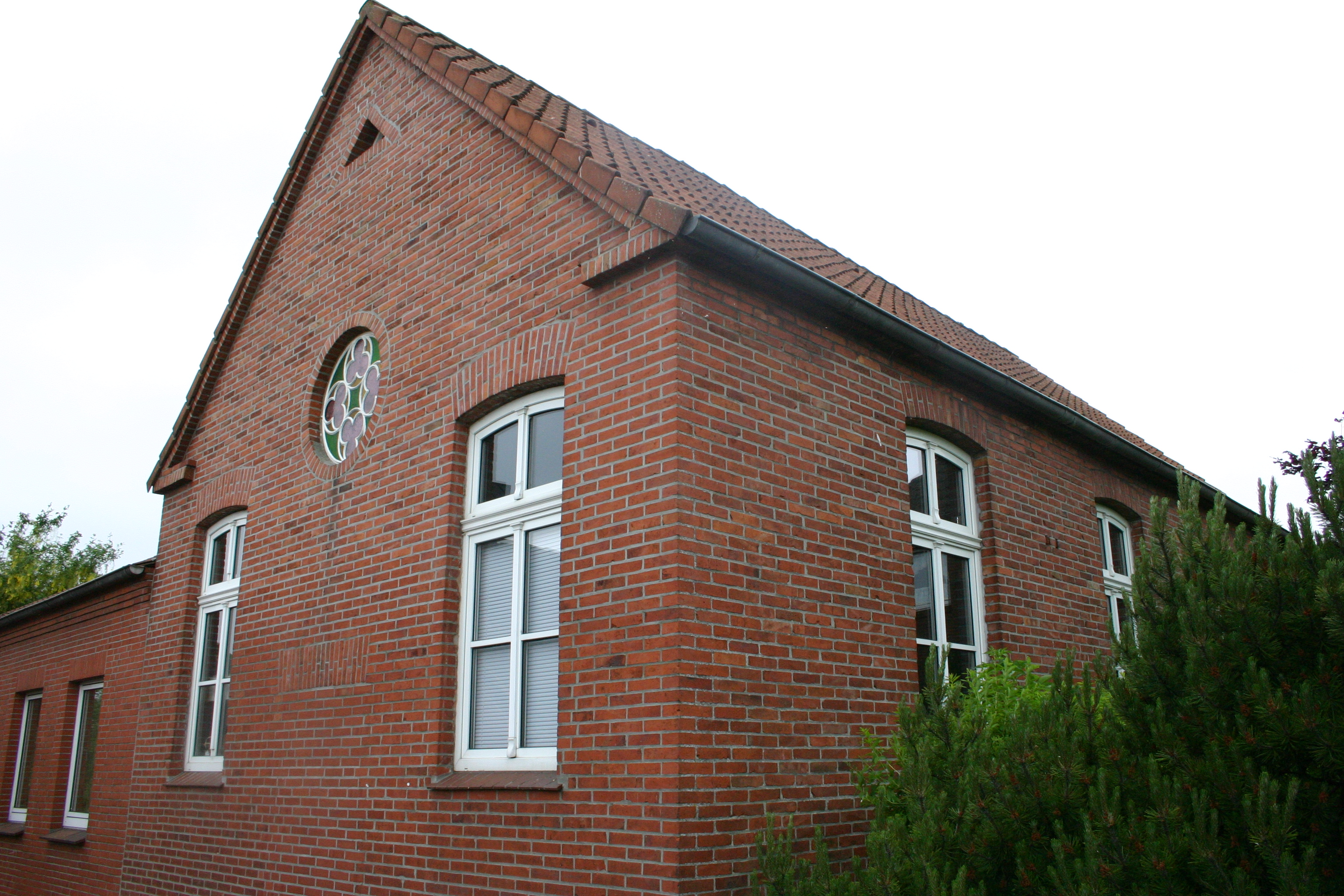
Chapel in Jennelt

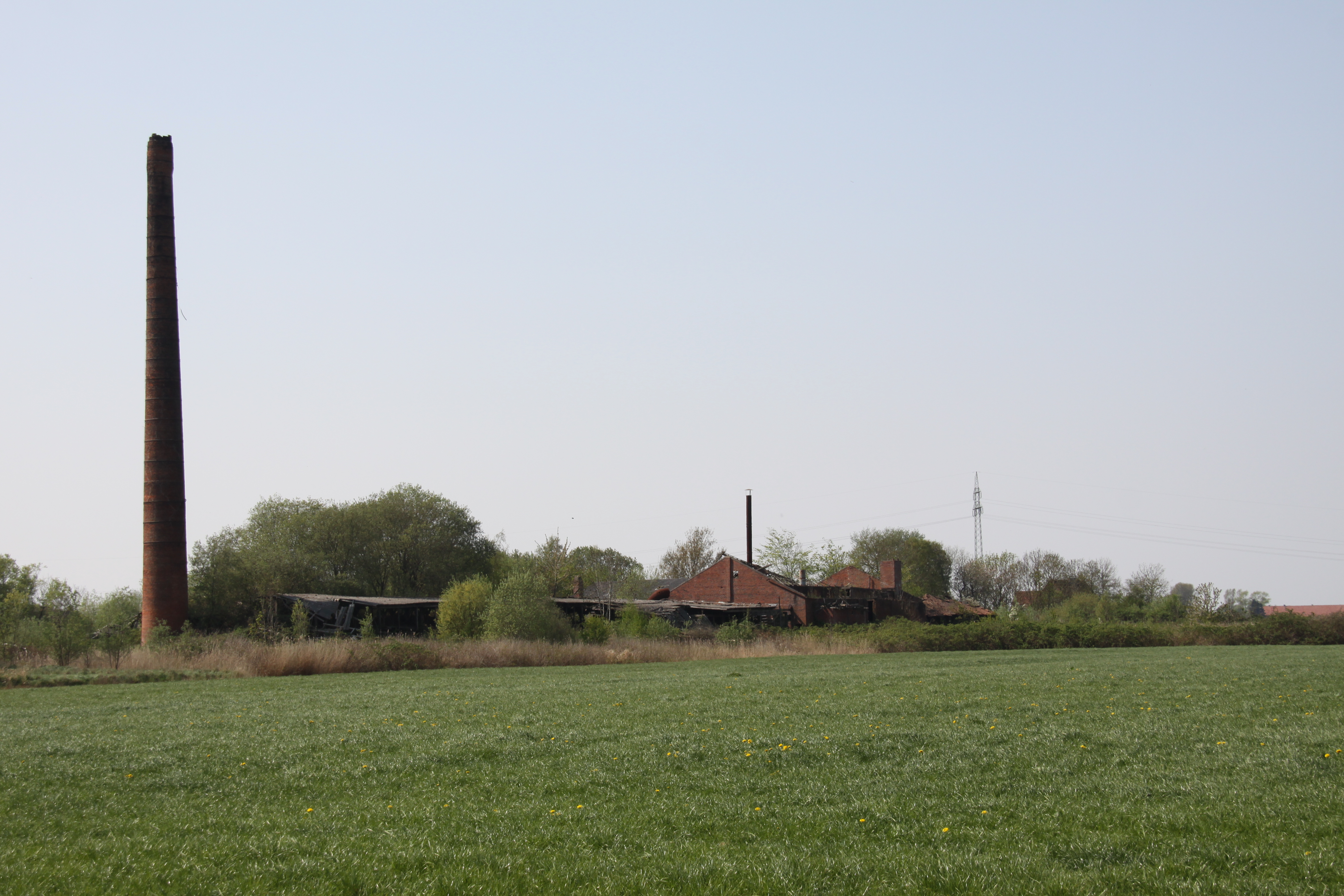
Former brickworks near Jennelt

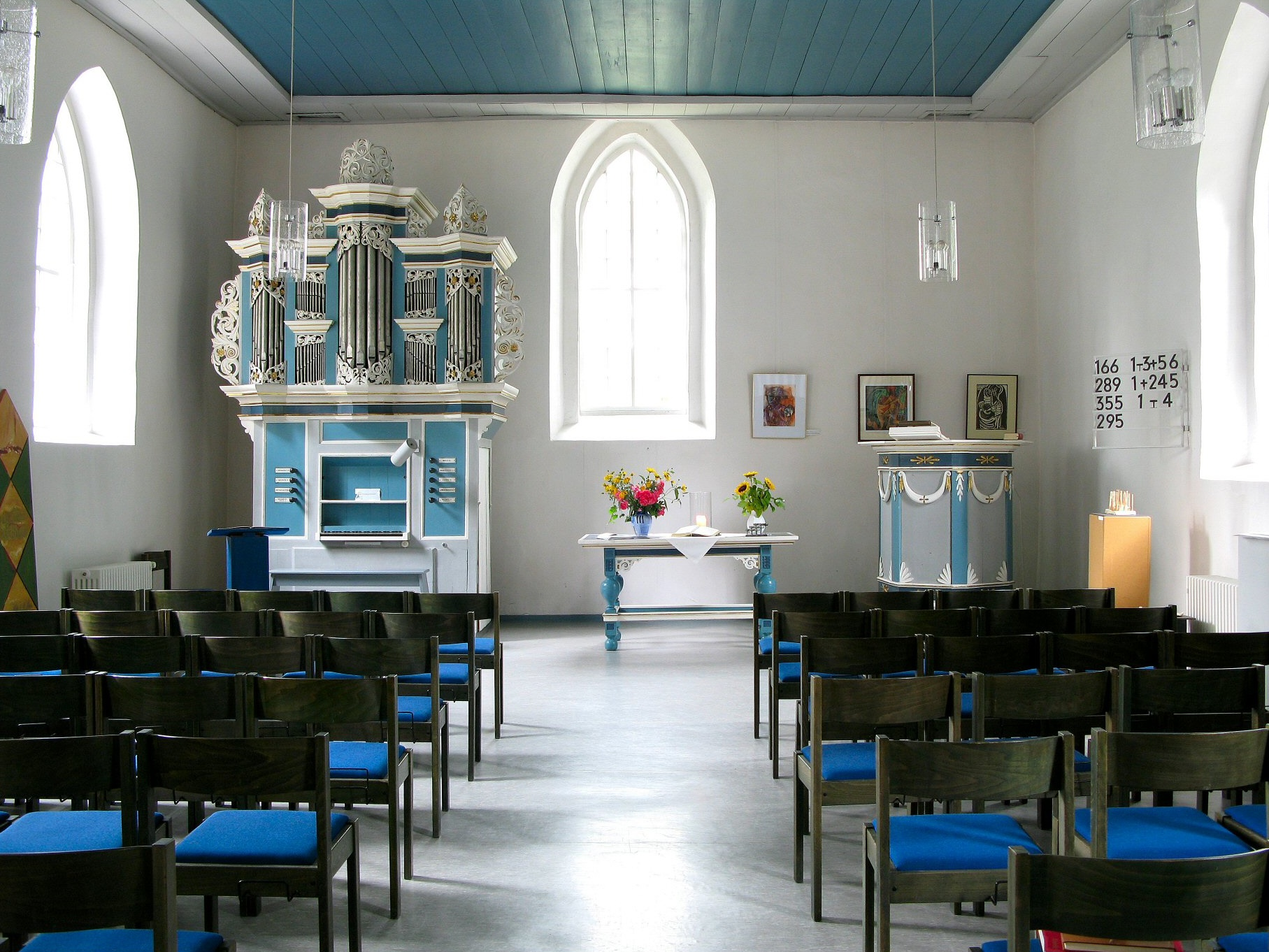
Interior of the church
