= Johannes Acronius =

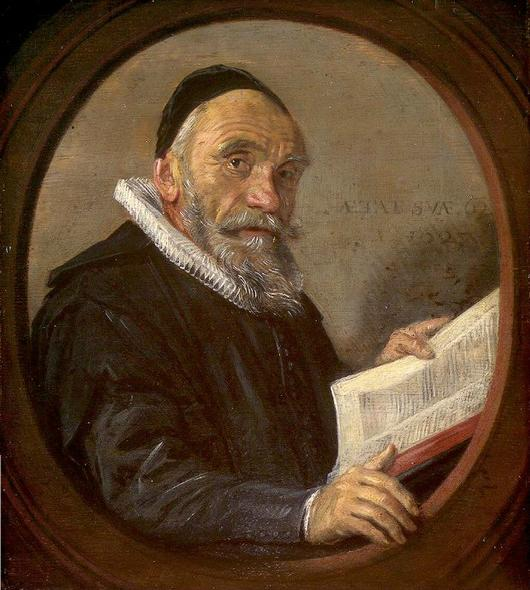
Portrait of Johannes Acronius by Frans Hals

Johannes Acronius (1565 – 29 September 1627) was a German Reformed theologian. He is less known by scientific works, than by his part in the quarrel between Arminians (Remonstrants) and Contra-Remonstrants (see History of Calvinist–Arminian debate).

== Life ==
He was born in Grimersum, East Frisia, the son of a preacher, Bernardus Acronius, in a village north of Emden, now in the municipality of Krummhörn. He was taught by Zacharias Ursinus and Franciscus Junius in Neustadt an der Hardt, today Neustadt an der Weinstrasse. In 1584 he became a preacher in Eilsum, East Frisia, later in 1601 he was called to Groningen where he served for 10 years, during which time he was called several times to Amsterdam, but he refused as he did not want to take part in the arguments between Franciscus Gomarus and Jacobus Arminius. In 1611 he was called to Wesel, but when that city was conquered by the Spanish he fled to Deventer. He declined calls to Haarlem and Deventer, because he couldn't preach about the political situation in the church that had so nearly cost him his life. Unable to preach, in 1617 he became professor for theology at the University of Franeker. Once installed, he preached there now and then on Sundays and served as substitute in nearby Kampen, Overijssel. Contra-Remonstrants there sent him to the Synod of Dort, mainly to counter some of his colleagues in this area who were deemed too favourable towards Arminius' teachings. Being the delegate of the church assembly of Dordrecht in 1618–1619, he indeed accused them of Arminianism, resulting in the unseating of several.

In 1619, he went to work as a preacher in Haarlem where his portrait was painted by Frans Hals and where he stayed until his death. The Calvinists of the time saw in him an educated man of oratory skills, with the fervour to stand for their truth. His opponents described him as an unsettled man with a tendency to polemise.

He died in Haarlem in 1627.

== Publications ==
- Syntagma Theologiae, Groningen, 1605
- Elenchus orthodoxus pseudo-relig. Romano-Cathol., Deventer, 1615
- Uytmonsteringe van verscheydene dolingen ... der genoemde Lutherschen, Arnheim, 1625

== Sources ==
- Allgemeine Deutsche Biographie - online version
- Acronius, Johannes in the Global Anabaptist Mennonite Encyclopedia Online.
