= Grimersum =

- Village of Krummhörn
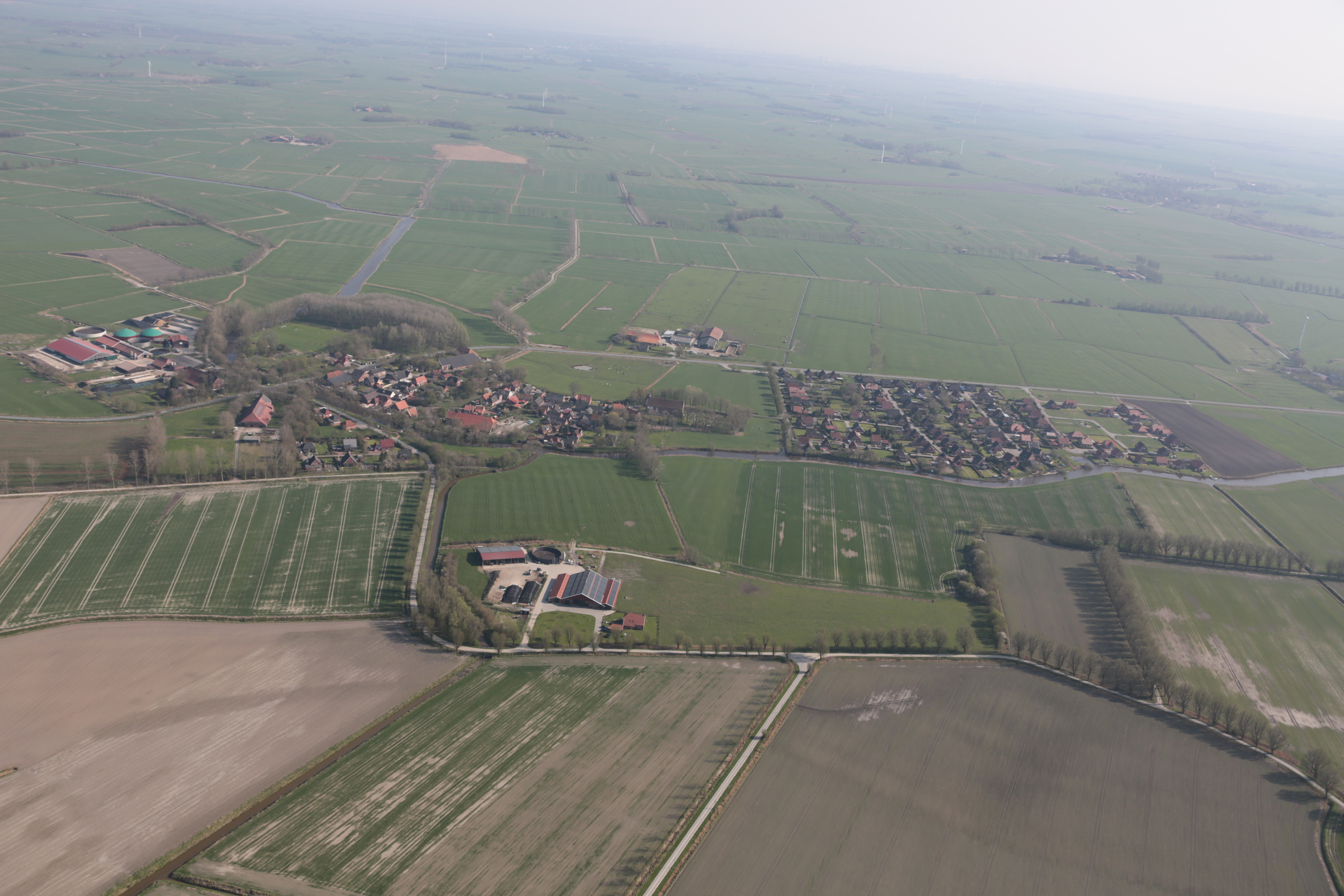
- Aerial view of Grimersum

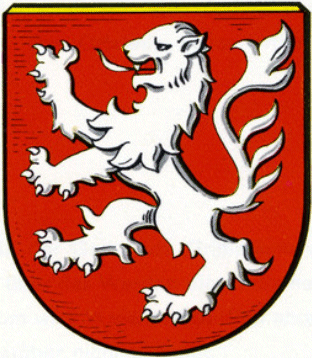
- Coat of arms
- Interactive map of Grimersum
- Location within Germany Location within Lower Saxony
- Country: Germany
- State: Lower Saxony
- District: Aurich
- Municipality: Krummhörn

Area
  - Metro: 16.13 km^{2} (6.23 sq mi)
- Elevation: 3.8 m (12 ft)

Population
  - Metro: 577
- Time zone: UTC+01:00 (CET)
  - Summer (DST): UTC+02:00 (CEST)
- Postal codes: 26736
- Dialling codes: 04920

Grimersum is a village in the region of East Frisia, in Lower Saxony, Germany. It is part of the municipality of Krummhörn. The village is located between Eilsum and Wirdum, about 12.5 kilometers north of Emden.

The village, like the nearby village of Groothusen, is one of the elongated warft villages that were built in the early 8th century on estuaries and bends as trading places for the expanding overseas trade of the Frisian peasant merchants. The village is dominated by an old church, which was built in the 13th century.

== Gallery ==
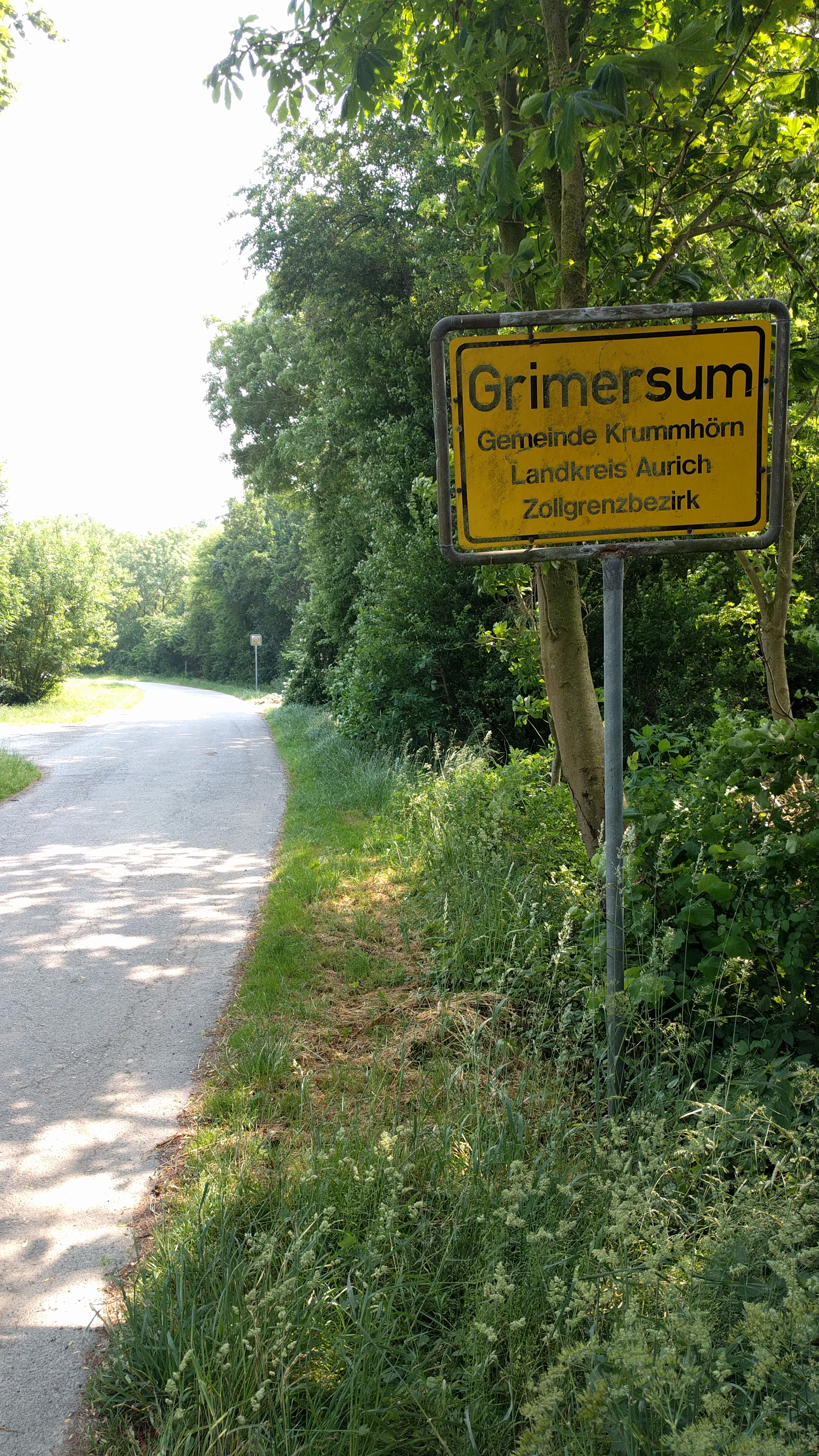
Entrance to Grimersum

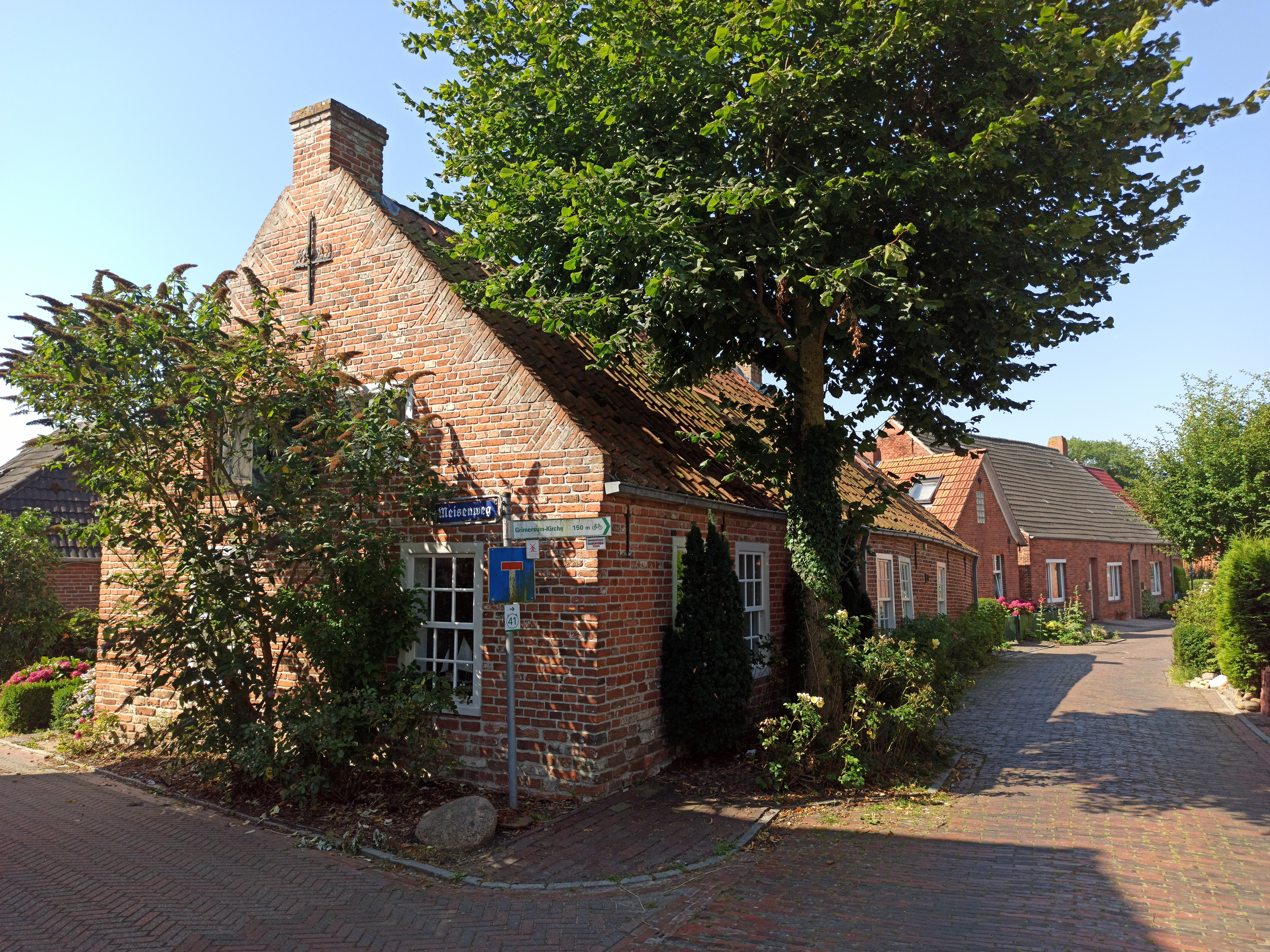
Worker's house

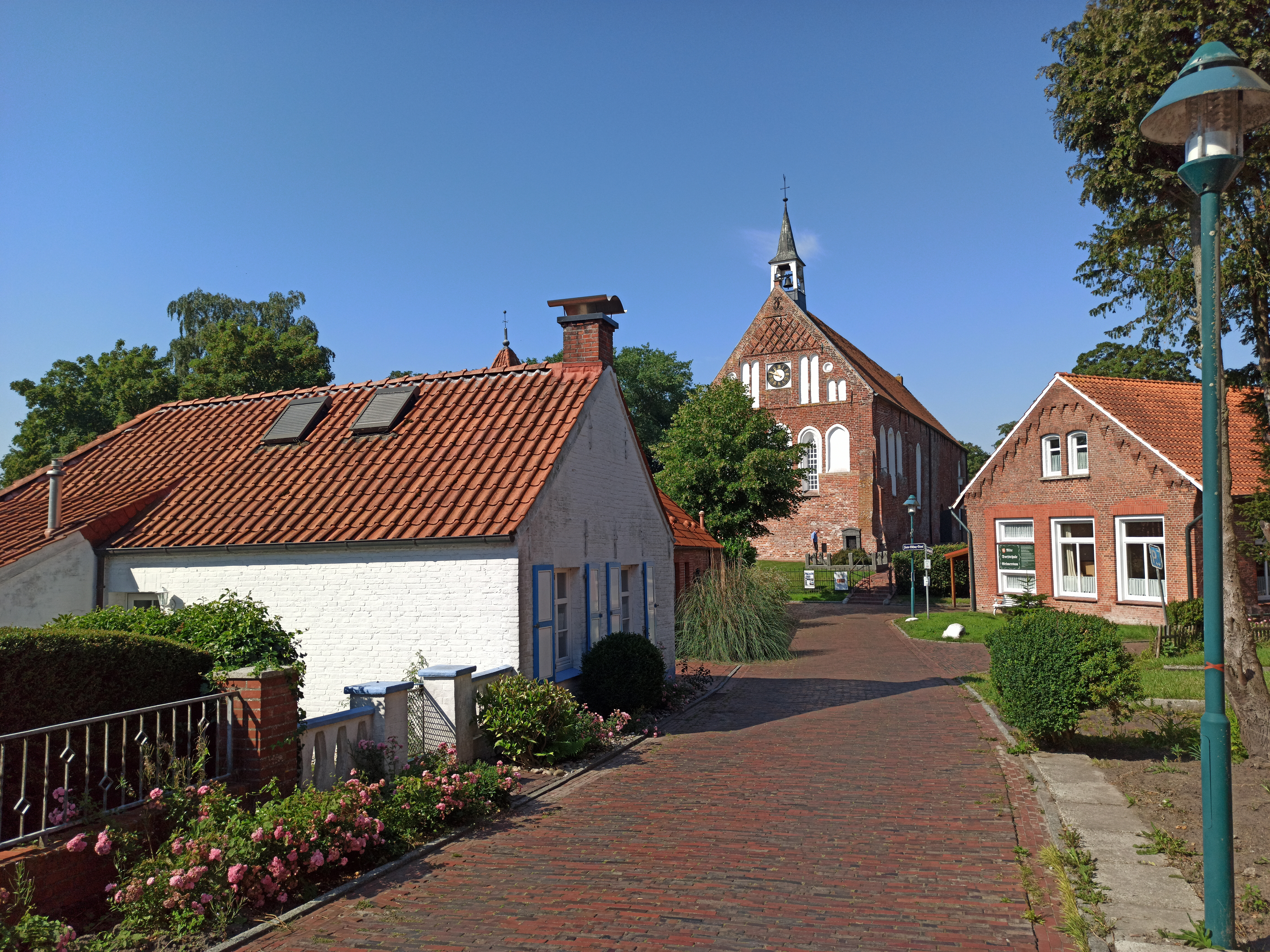
View of the Church of Grimersum

== Notable people ==
- Eggerik Beninga (1490–1562), chronicler
- Johannes Acronius (1565–1627), theologian
