= Eilsum =

- Village of Krummhörn
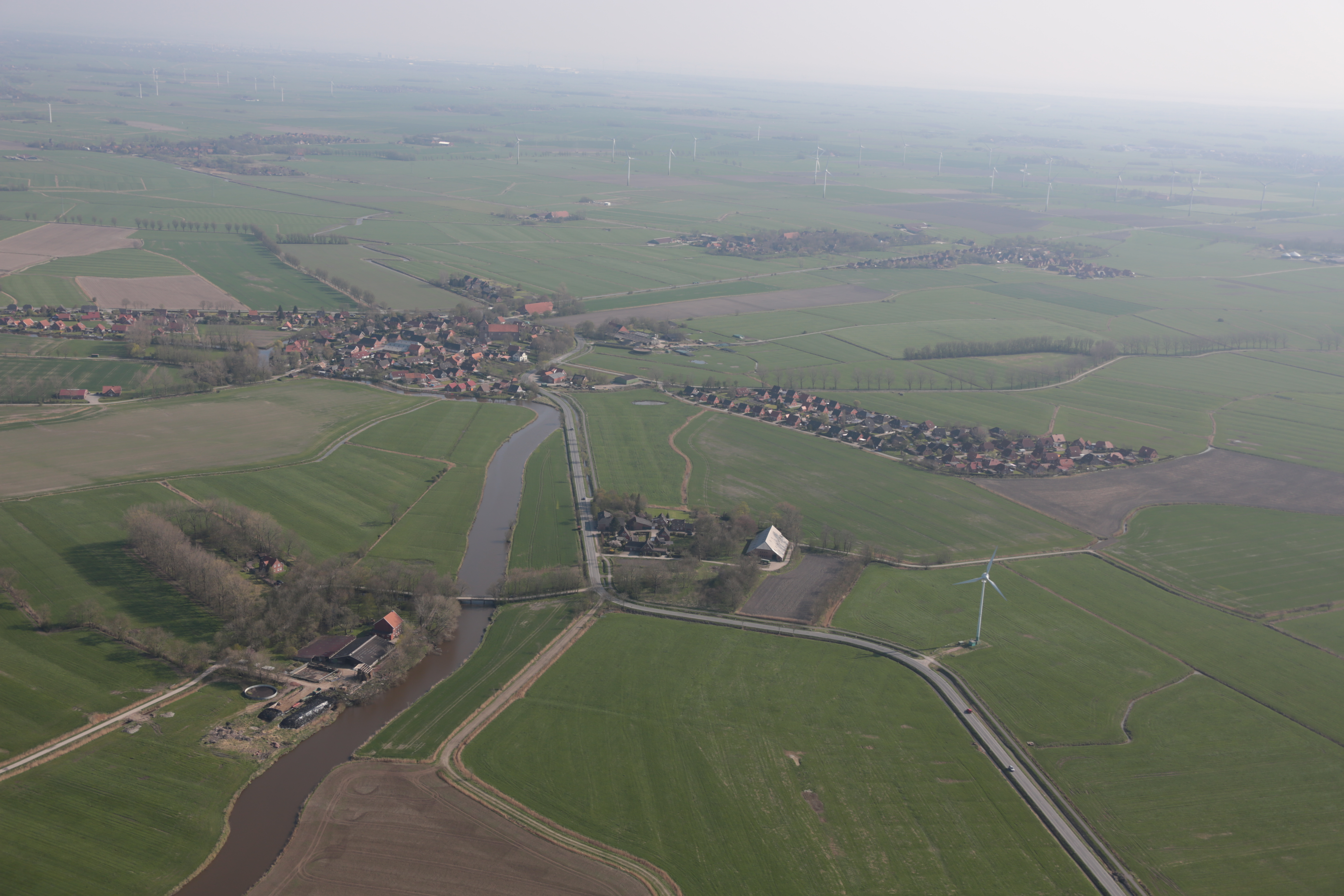
- Aerial view of Eilsum

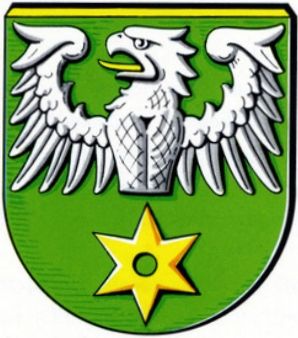
- Coat of arms
- Interactive map of Eilsum
- Location within Germany Location within Lower Saxony
- Country: Germany
- State: Lower Saxony
- District: Aurich
- Municipality: Krummhörn

Area
  - Metro: 11.09 km^{2} (4.28 sq mi)
- Elevation: 1 m (3.3 ft)

Population
  - Metro: 569
- Time zone: UTC+01:00 (CET)
  - Summer (DST): UTC+02:00 (CEST)
- Postal codes: 26736
- Dialling codes: 04923

Eilsum is a village in the region of East Frisia, in Lower Saxony, Germany. It is part of the municipality of Krummhörn. The village is located to the north of Jennelt and to the west of Grimersum.

Eilsum was first mentioned in documents around 1300 under the names Edelsum, Ethilsum and Edelsheim. These names could also be found in the parish register of Münster at the end of the 15th century.

Eilsum was built on a warft. On this warft now stands a rather large church, the Church of Eilsum, which dates from the 13th century.

== Gallery ==
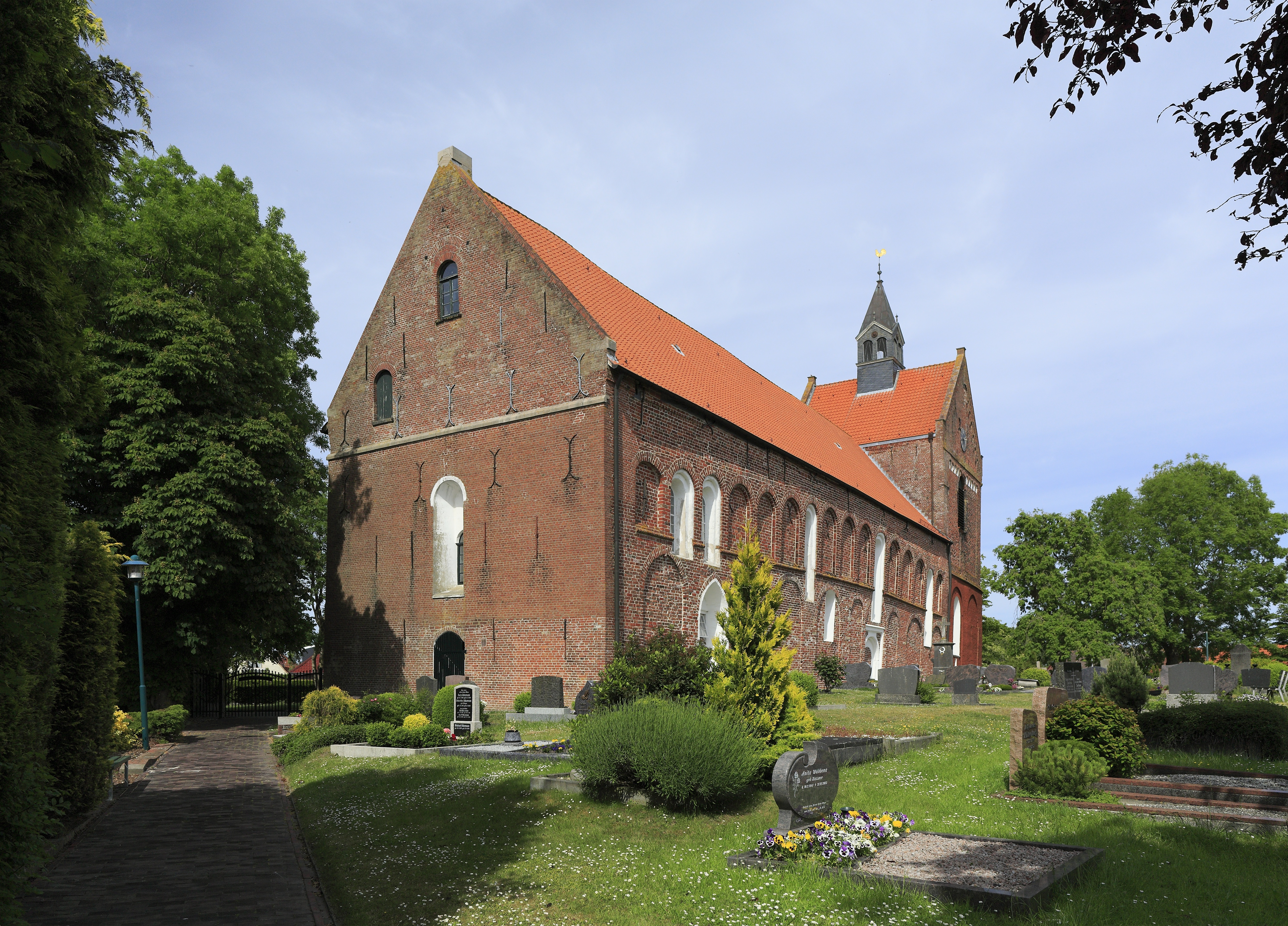
Church of Eilsum

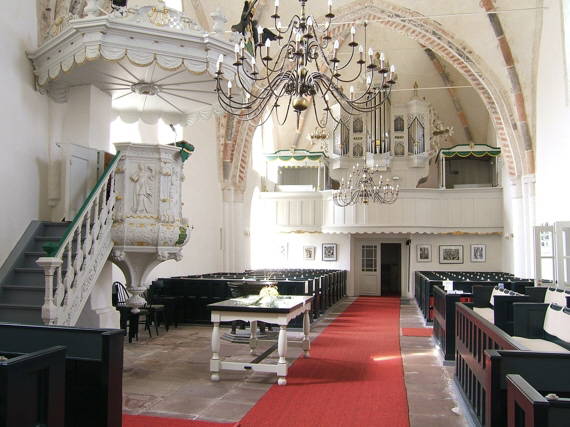
Interior of the church

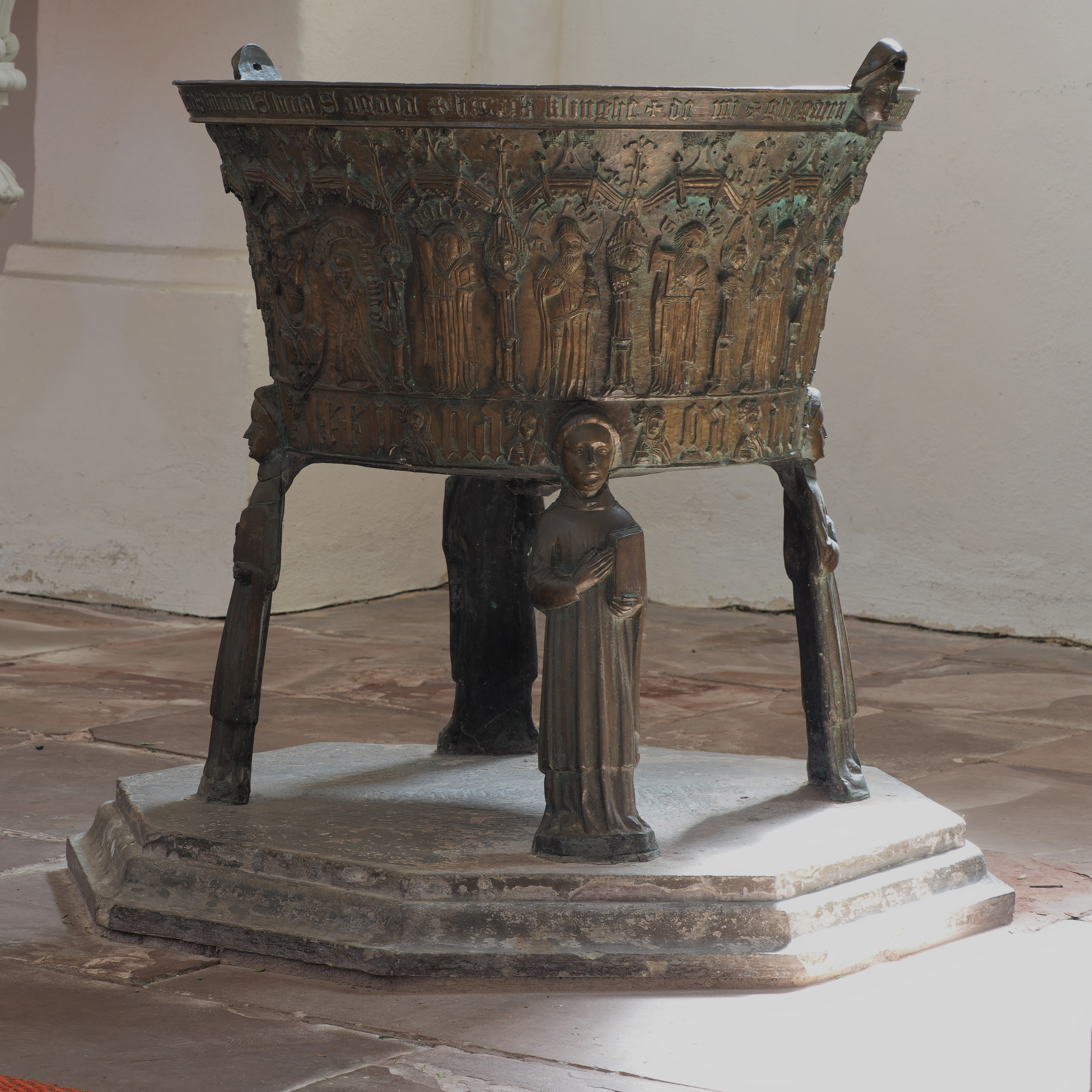
Baptism font from the 15th century
